= List of awards and nominations received by EastEnders =

EastEnders logo

EastEnders is a British soap opera that has aired on BBC One since 19 February 1985. It has been nominated for a variety of different awards. Its first award, for Favourite Programme, was given by the Anna Scher Theatre on 24 January 1986. At the British Academy Television Awards, EastEnders has won the Best Soap or Best Continuing Drama Award 12 times, as well as Best Drama Series once. The show has won in the Serial Drama category at the National Television Awards eleven times, as well as winning Best Soap at the Royal Television Society Programme Awards five times.

At The British Soap Awards, it has won Best British Soap 12 times, Best Storyline 5 times and Best Single Episode 5 times. In 2013, Adam Woodyatt won the British Soap Award for Lifetime Achievement for his portrayal of Ian Beale. His win has been followed by Rudolph Walker and Letitia Dean also getting the accolade at subsequent ceremonies. The show has won Inside Soap's Best Soap Award 14 times since the ceremonies' inception in 2001. In March 2009, EastEnders won its third TRIC award in the category TV Soap of the Year, having also won similar categories at the British Soap Awards, National Television Awards, TV Choice Awards, and Inside Soap Awards within 10 months. EastEnders' Executive Producer Diederick Santer commented that this was due to having "the most talented cast and crew in the business, and the most fantastic and dedicated audience." Several different EastEnders cast members have received acting award nominations for their performances in the show. June Brown is the only EastEnders actor to receive a nomination at the British Academy Television Awards and Patsy Palmer is the only one to be nominated in the Royal Television Society Programme Awards. Simon May won a TRIC award in 1986 for the EastEnders theme tune and co-creator Tony Holland and writer Tony Jordan have also been honoured.

EastEnders has also been awarded at various diversity and mental health-related ceremonies throughout its course. During the tenure of the Screen Nation Film and Television Awards, EastEnders was awarded 5 times, receiving varies other nominations and honourable mentions for their Black cast members. It has also seen 4 Best TV Character wins at the Asian Media Awards. The Mental Health Media Awards has awarded the show on numerous occasions, for storylines involving Kat Slater's (Jessie Wallace) rape and attempted suicide and the mental health of Stacey (Lacey Turner) and Jean Slater (Gillian Wright).

== All About Soap Awards ==
The All About Soap Awards (formerly the All About Soap Bubble Awards) were presented by All About Soap magazine and voted for by the public.

Year	Category	Nominee(s)	Result	Ref(s)
2007	Best Double Act	Ricky Groves and Cliff Parisi (Garry Hobbs and Minty Peterson)	Won	
2007	Best Double Act	Lacey Turner and Charlie Clements (Stacey Slater and Bradley Branning)	Nominated	
2007	Christmas Cracker	Wendy Richard (Pauline Fowler)	Nominated	
2007	Christmas Cracker	Lacey Turner and Jake Wood (Stacey Slater and Max Branning)	Nominated	
2007	I'm a Survivor	Emma Barton (Honey Mitchell)	Nominated	
2007	I'm a Survivor	Diane Parish (Denise Fox)	Nominated	
2007	Soap Scrap	Wendy Richard and Barbara Windsor (Pauline Fowler and Peggy Mitchell)	Nominated	
2007	Soap Scrap	Adam Woodyatt and Laurie Brett (Ian and Jane Beale)	Nominated	
2007	Tearjerker	Lacey Turner (Stacey Slater)	Won	
2007	Wedding Shock	Laurie Brett and Adam Woodyatt (Jane Beale and Ian Beale)	Won	
2007	Fittest Fella	Rob Kazinsky (Sean Slater)	Nominated	
2007	Best Celeb Style	Kara Tointon (Dawn Swann)	Won	
2008	Fatal Attraction	Samantha Janus and Scott Maslen (Ronnie Mitchell and Jack Branning)	Nominated	
2008	Fatal Attraction	Jo Joyner and Robert Kazinsky (Tanya Branning and Sean Slater)	Nominated	
2008	I'm a Survivor	Laurie Brett (Jane Beale)	Nominated	
2008	Secret's Out	Aaron Sidwell (Steven Beale)	Nominated	
2008	Secret's Out	Lacey Turner, Charlie Clements, Jake Wood and Jo Joyner (Stacey, Bradley, Max and Tanya Branning)	Won	
2008	Soap Slap	Lacey Turner and Jo Joyner (Stacey and Tanya Branning)	Won	
2008	Tearjerker	Jo Joyner (Tanya Branning)	Won	
2008	Fittest Fella	Rob Kazinsky (Sean Slater)	Nominated	
2008	Fittest Fella	Scott Maslen (Jack Branning)	Nominated	
2008	Best Celeb Style	Kara Tointon (Dawn Swann)	Nominated	
2009	Bad Boy	Jake Wood (Max Branning)	Nominated	
2009	Bad Girl	Charlie Brooks (Janine Butcher)	Won	
2009	Best Soap	EastEnders	Nominated	
2009	Fatal Attraction	Robert Kazinsky and Rita Simons (Sean Slater and Roxy Slater)	Won	
2009	Fight Club	Jake Wood and Scott Maslen (Max Branning and Jack Branning)	Won	
2009	Killer Secret	Robert Kazinsky, Rita Simons and Scott Maslen (Sean Slater, Roxy Slater and Jack Branning)	Nominated	
2009	I'm a Survivor	Jo Joyner (Tanya Branning)	Nominated	
2009	I'm a Survivor	Patsy Palmer (Bianca Jackson)	Nominated	
2009	Tearjerker	The passing of Wellard	Nominated	
2009	Best Celeb Style	Lacey Turner (Stacey Slater))	Nominated	
2009	Best Celeb Style	Kara Tointon (Dawn Swann)	Nominated	
2010	Baby Drama	Cheryl Fergison (Heather Trott)	Won	
2010	Bride and Doom	Marc Elliott and Preeya Kalidas (Syed Masood and Amira Shah)	Nominated	
2010	Fatal Attraction	Marc Elliott and John Partridge (Syed Masood and Christian Clarke)	Won	
2010	Femme Fatale	Charlie Brooks (Janine Butcher)	Won	
2010	I'm a Survivor	Lacey Turner (Stacey Slater)	Won	
2010	I'm a Survivor	Samantha Womack (Ronnie Mitchell)	Nominated	
2010	Killer Secret	Don Gilet (Lucas Johnson)	Nominated	
2010	Killer Secret	Lacey Turner (Stacey Slater for "Who Killed Archie?")	Won	
2010	Smooth Criminal	Don Gilet (Lucas Johnson)	Nominated	
2010	Best Celeb Style	Lacey Turner (Stacey Slater)	Nominated	
2011	Best Actor	Jake Wood (Max Branning)	Nominated	
2011	Best Actress	Jessie Wallace (Kat Moon)	Won	
2011	Best Baby Drama	Baby swap	Won	
2011	Best Comeback	Jessie Wallace and Shane Richie (Kat and Alfie Moon)	Won	
2011	Best Love Triangle	Lacey Turner (Stacey Slater), Neil McDermott (Ryan Malloy) and Charlie Brooks (Janine Butcher)	Nominated	
2011	Best Newcomer	Arinze Kene (Connor Stanley)	Nominated	
2011	Best Stunt	Queen Vic fire	Nominated	
2011	Best Celeb Style	Charlie Brooks (Janine Butcher)	Nominated	
2012	Best Actor	Jake Wood (Max Branning)	Nominated	
2012	Best Actress	Jo Joyner (Tanya Branning)	Won	
2012	Best Comeback	David Wicks (Michael French)	Won	
2012	Best Couple	Max and Tanya Branning (Jake Wood and Jo Joyner)	Won	
2012	Best Couple	Zainab Masood and Masood Ahmed (Nina Wadia and Nitin Ganatra)	Nominated	
2012	Best Episode	Pat Butcher's funeral	Nominated	
2012	Best Mystery	Who's Stalking Phil Mitchell?	Nominated	
2012	Best Villain	Jamie Foreman (Derek Branning)	Nominated	
2012	Best Dressed Soap Star	Jacqueline Jossa (Lauren Branning)	Nominated	
2013	Baby Drama	Lola fights for Lexi	Won	
2013	Best Death	Derek Branning (Jamie Foreman)	Nominated	
2013	Best Episode	Billy and the Olympic torch	Nominated	
2013	Best Reveal	Derek is Kat's lover	Nominated	
2013	Best Reveal	Kirsty is Max's secret wife	Won	
2013	Best Storyline	Derek's reign of terror	Nominated	
2013	Best Stunt	Joey and Lauren's crash	Nominated	
2013	Best Wedding	Christian Clarke and Syed Masood	Nominated	
2013	Forbidden Lovers	Joey and Lauren Branning	Nominated	
2015	Best Soap Moment of 2014	Lucy Beale is killed	Nominated	
2015	Best Soap Moment of 2014	Linda tells Mick Carter about her ordeal	Nominated	
2015	Best Soap Moment of 2014	Ronnie Mitchell's car crash	Nominated	

== British Academy Awards ==
=== Television Awards ===
The British Academy Television Awards (BAFTA TV Awards) are awarded annually by the British Academy of Film and Television Arts. EastEnders has received 24 British Academy Television Awards nominations and has won 12 of them. It won the award for Best Drama Series in 1997 and has been won the Best Continuing Drama or Best Soap accolade in 1997, 1999, 2000, 2002, 2006, 2010, 2011, 2013, 2016, 2019, 2025 and 2026. June Brown was nominated in 2009 for Best Actress, the first time a soap opera actress was nominated in this category since Jean Alexander, who played Hilda Ogden in Coronation Street in 1988. She was billed the favourite to win the award, but lost out to Anna Maxwell Martin.

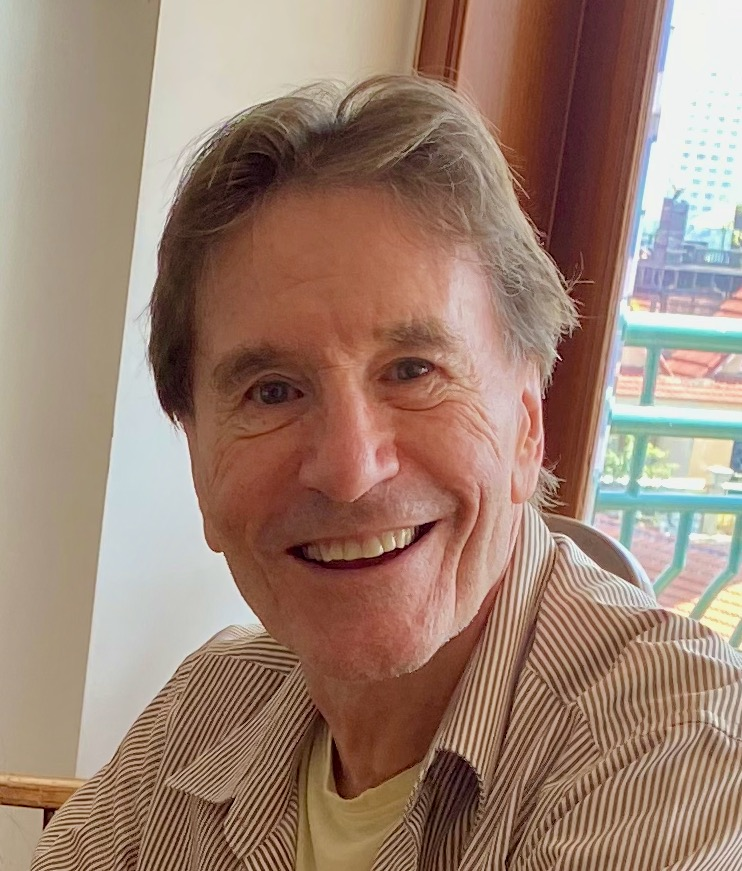
Executive producer Matthew Robinson was credited with two wins for Best Soap at the BAFTA TV Awards.

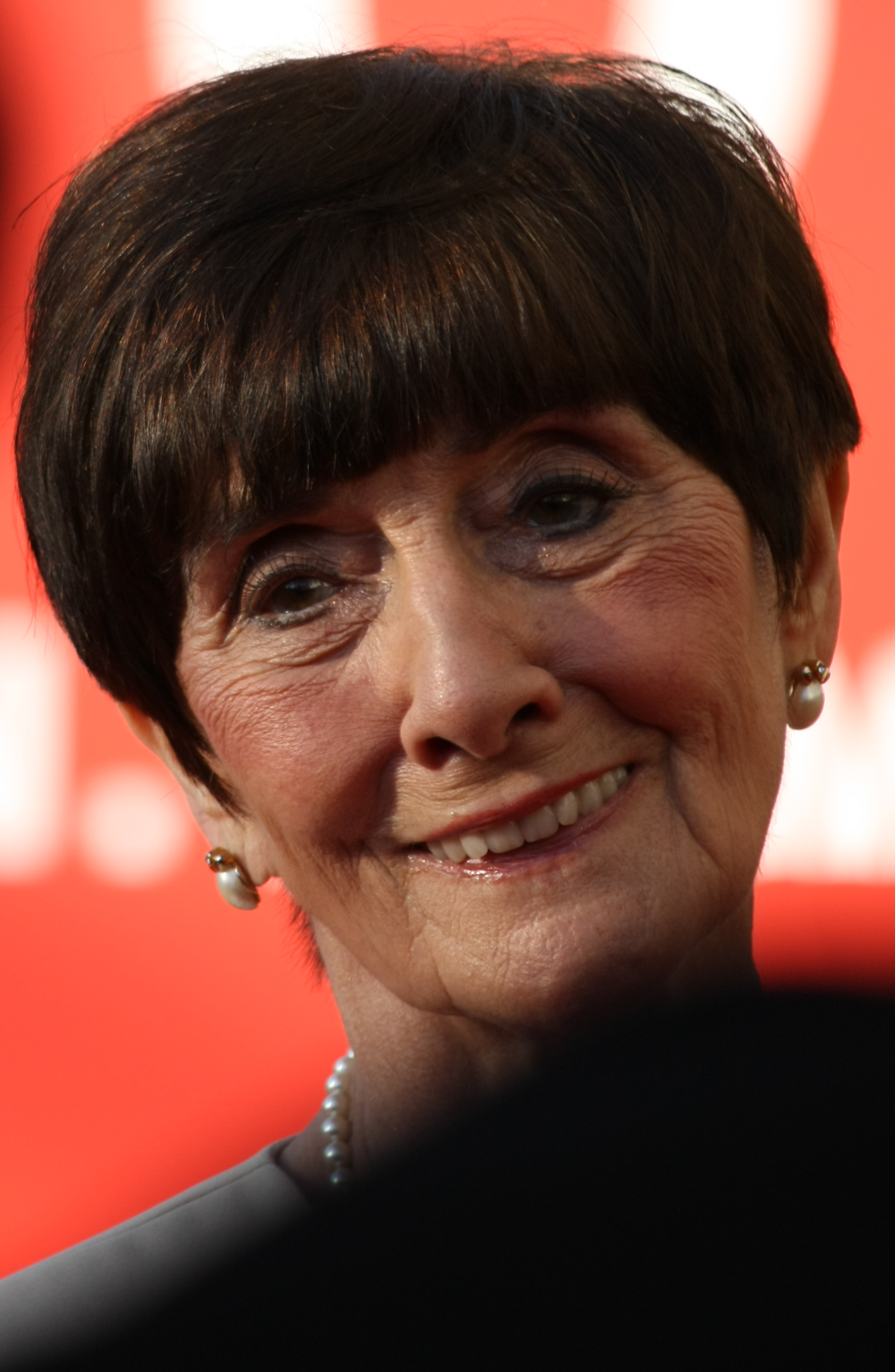
June Brown (Dot Cotton) is the only EastEnders actor to receive a BAFTA TV Award nomination.

Year	Category	Nominee(s)	Result	Ref(s)
1997	Best Drama Series	EastEnders (Corinne Hollingworth, Jane Harris)	Won	
1999	Best Soap	EastEnders (Matthew Robinson)	Won	
2000	Best Soap	EastEnders (Matthew Robinson)	Won	
2001	Best Soap	EastEnders (production team)	Nominated	
2002	Best Soap	EastEnders (production team)	Won	
2003	Best Soap	EastEnders (production team)	Nominated	
2006	Best Continuing Drama	EastEnders (production team)	Won	
2007	Best Continuing Drama	EastEnders (production team)	Nominated	
2008	Best Continuing Drama	EastEnders (production team)	Nominated	
2009	Best Continuing Drama	EastEnders (production team)	Nominated	
2009	Best Actress	June Brown (Dot Branning)	Nominated	
2010	Best Continuing Drama	EastEnders (production team)	Won	
2011	Best Continuing Drama	EastEnders (production team)	Won	
2012	Best Soap and Continuing Drama	EastEnders (production team)	Nominated	
2013	Best Soap and Continuing Drama	EastEnders (production team)	Won	
2014	Best Soap and Continuing Drama	EastEnders (production team)	Nominated	
2015	Best Soap and Continuing Drama	EastEnders (production team)	Nominated	
2015	Radio Times Audience Award	EastEnders	Nominated	
2016	Best Soap and Continuing Drama	EastEnders (production team)	Won	
2017	Best Soap and Continuing Drama	EastEnders (production team)	Nominated	
2019	Best Soap and Continuing Drama	EastEnders (production team)	Won	
2021	Best Soap and Continuing Drama	EastEnders (production team)	Nominated	
2021	Virgin TV's Must-See Moment	Gray kills Chantelle	Nominated	
2023	Best Soap and Continuing Drama	EastEnders (production team)	Nominated	
2024	Best Soap	EastEnders (production team)	Nominated	
2025	Best Soap	EastEnders (production team)	Won	
2026	Best Soap	EastEnders (production team)	Won	

=== Television Craft Awards ===
The British Academy Television Craft Awards are an annual accolade presented by the British Academy of Film and Television Arts (BAFTA).

Year	Category	Nominee(s)	Result	Ref(s)
2025	Special Award	EastEnders	Won	

== British Soap Awards ==
The British Soap Awards began in 1999 and EastEnders has since won the award for Best British Soap 12 times. A select amount of awards are voted for by the public, including Best British Soap and Best Leading Performer, while the rest are decided by a panel. June Brown won the Lifetime Achievement Award in 2005 for her portrayal of Dot Cotton. Subsequent winners have included Wendy Richard (Pauline Fowler), Pam St Clement (Pat Butcher), Adam Woodyatt (Ian Beale), Steve McFadden (Phil Mitchell), Rudolph Walker (Patrick Trueman) and Letitia Dean (Sharon Watts). In 2018, an award was given jointly for the first time, as the Scene of the Year accolade received equal numbers of votes for EastEnders and Doctors.

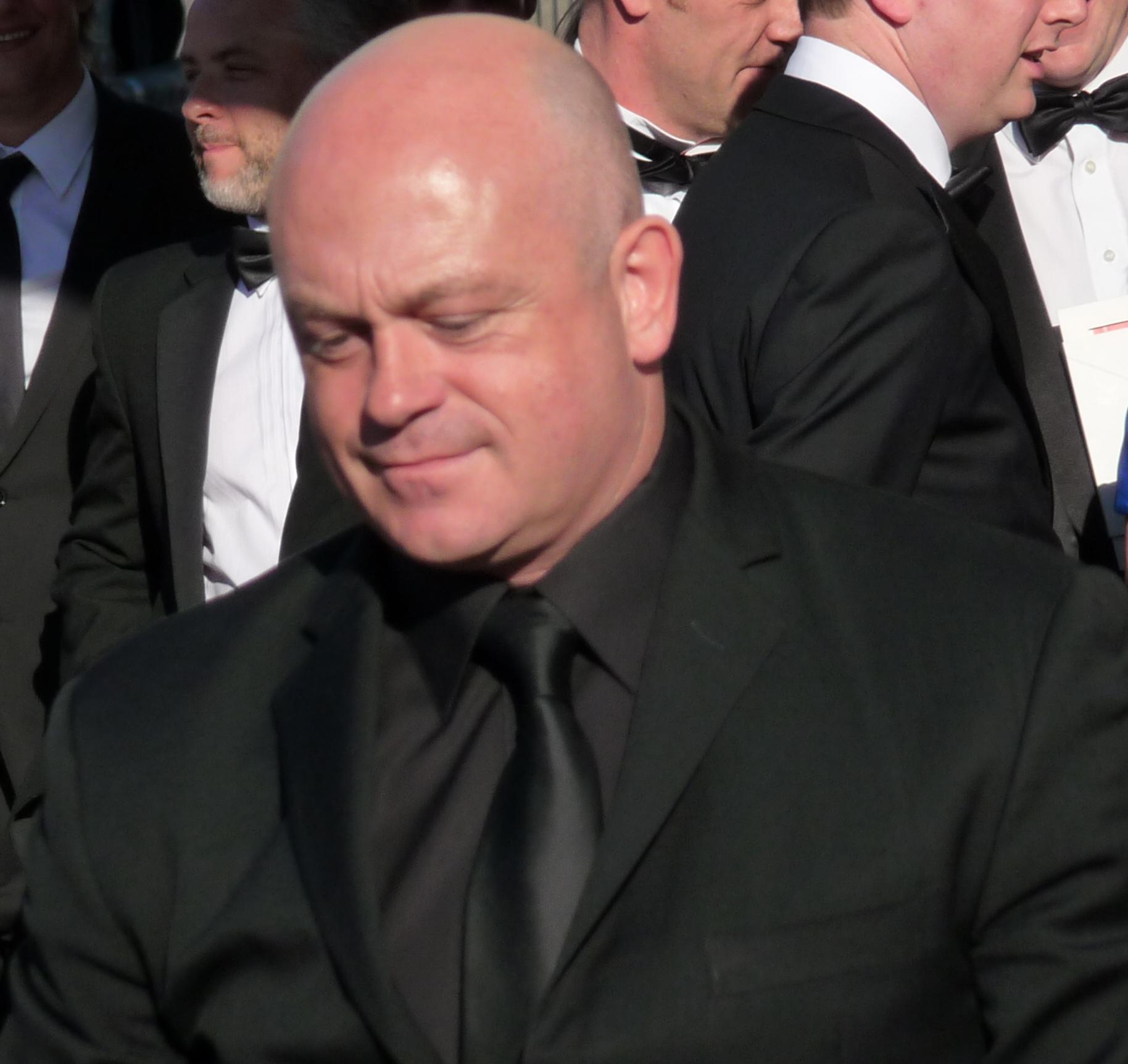
Ross Kemp (Grant Mitchell) has won Best Actor twice, in 1999 and 2006.

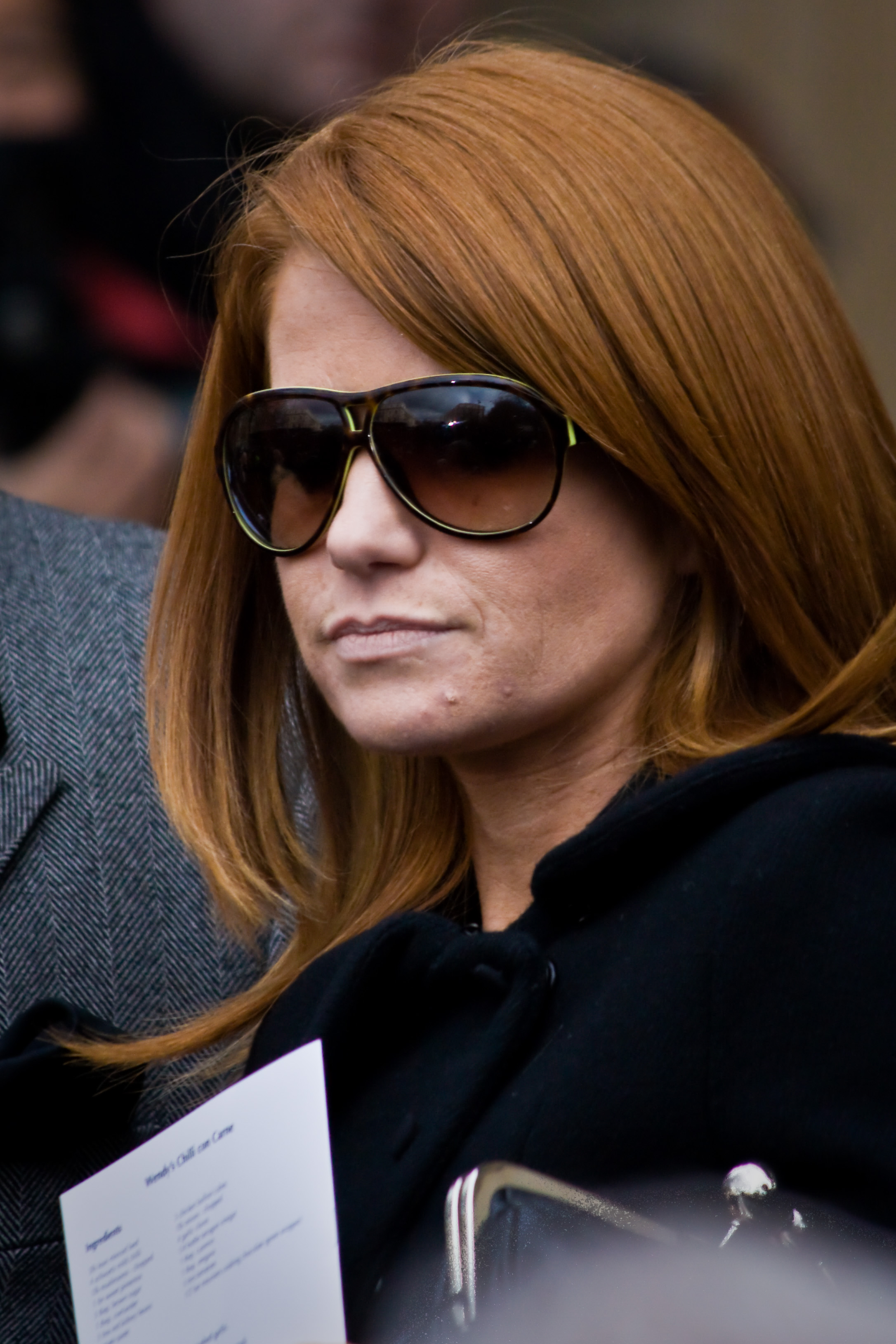
Patsy Palmer (Bianca Jackson) was awarded Best Actress in 2000.

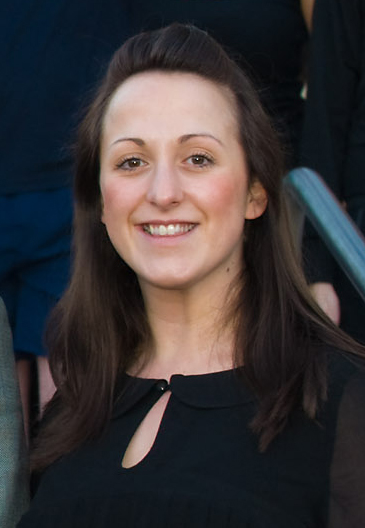
Natalie Cassidy (Sonia Fowler) was awarded Best Actress in 2001.

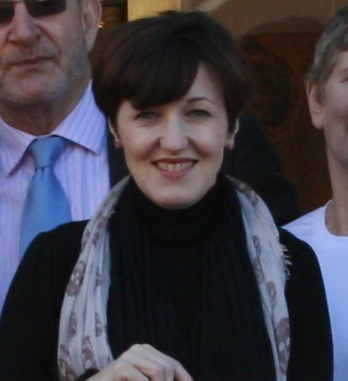
Kacey Ainsworth (Little Mo Mitchell) was awarded Best Actress in 2002 and 2003.

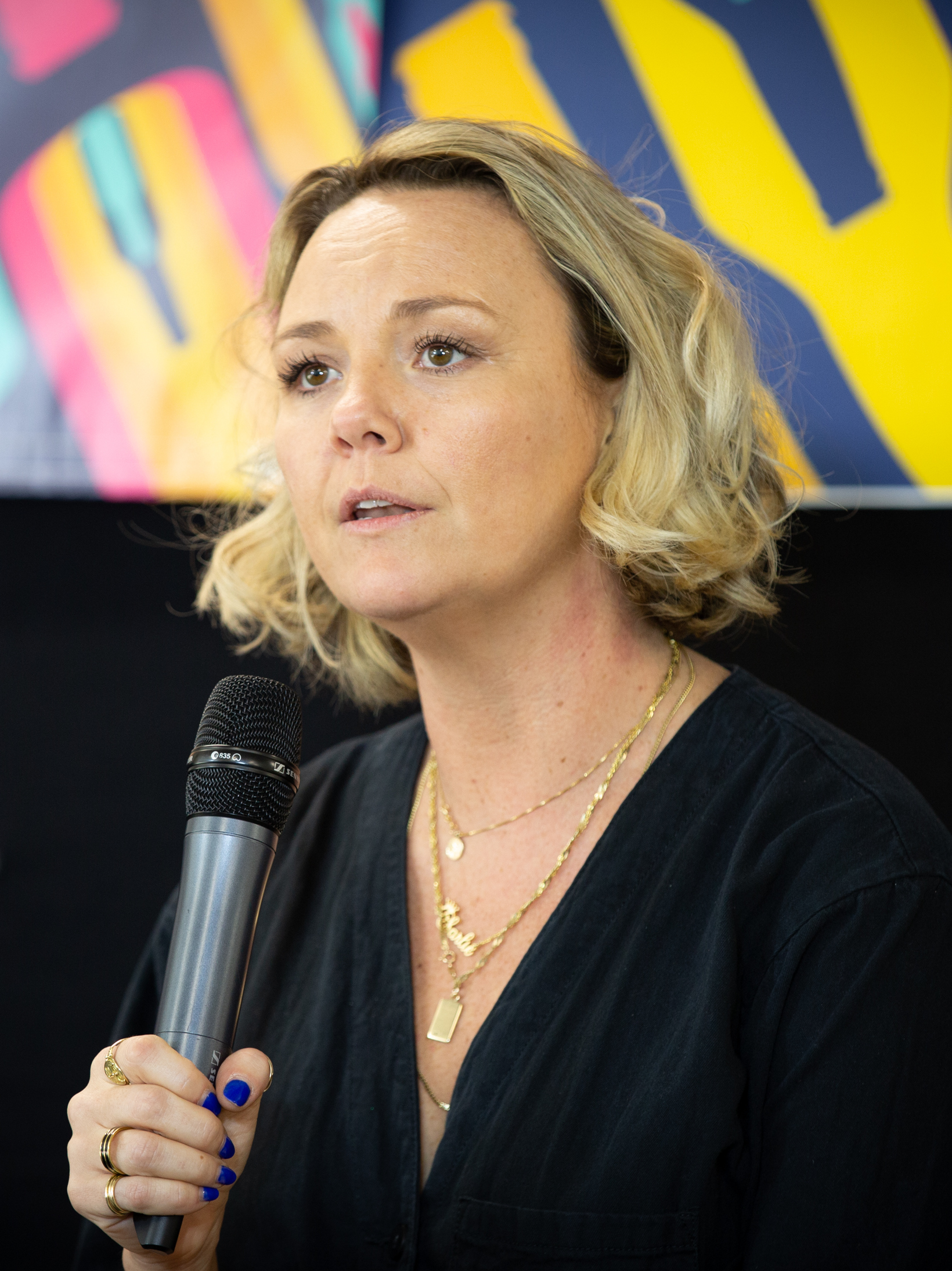
Charlie Brooks (Janine Butcher) was awarded Villain of the Year in 2004.

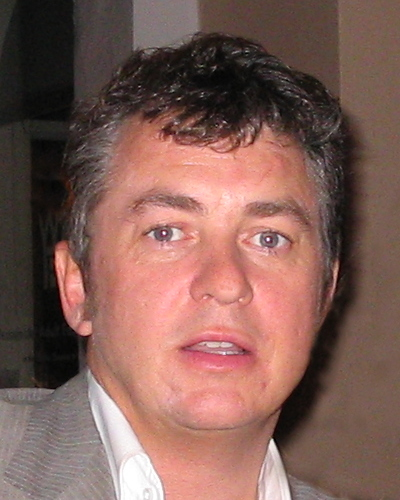
Shane Richie (Alfie Moon) won Best Actor at the British Soap Awards in 2005.

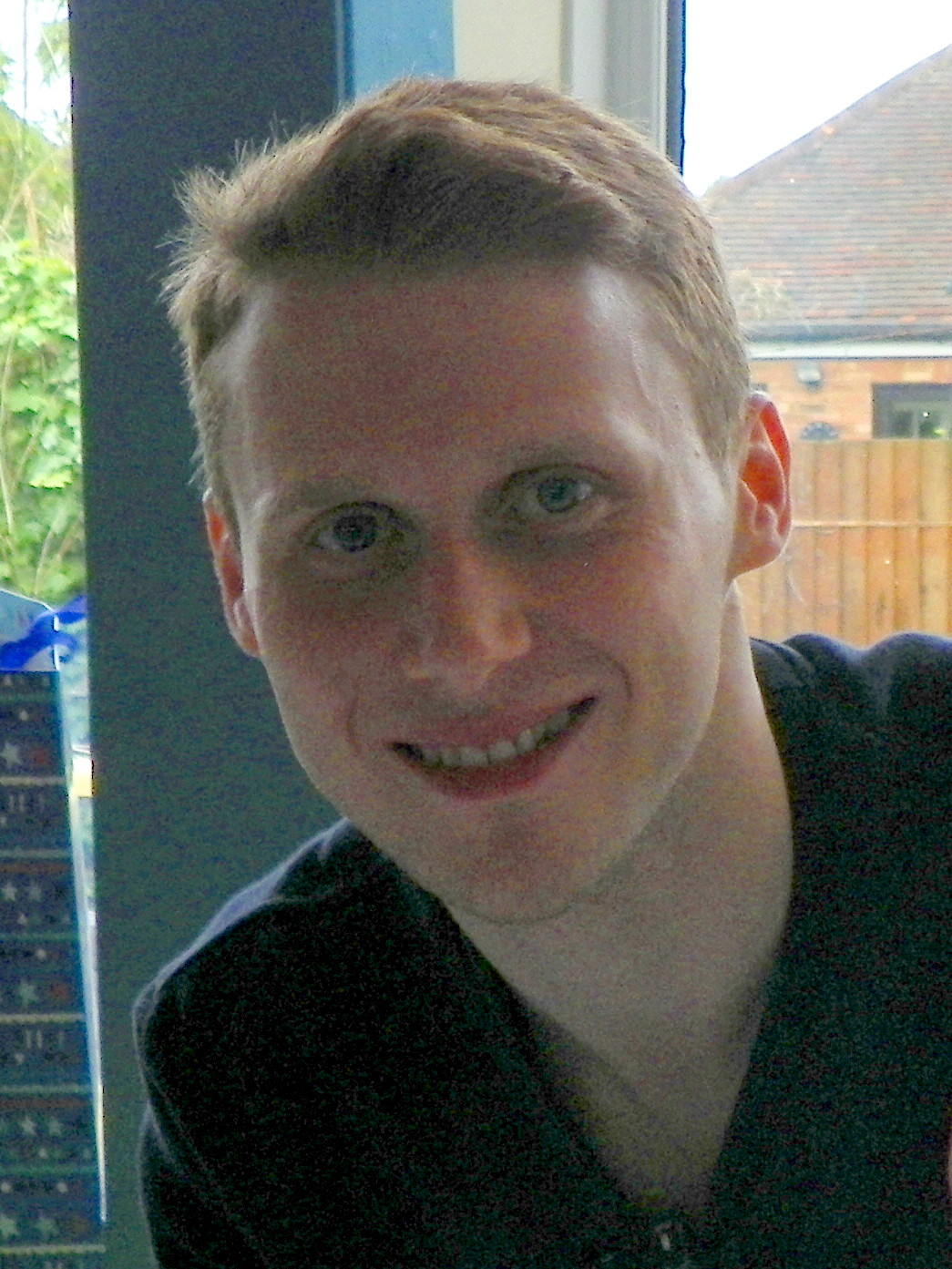
Jamie Borthwick (Jay Brown) was awarded Best Dramatic Performance from a Young Actor or Actress in 2008.

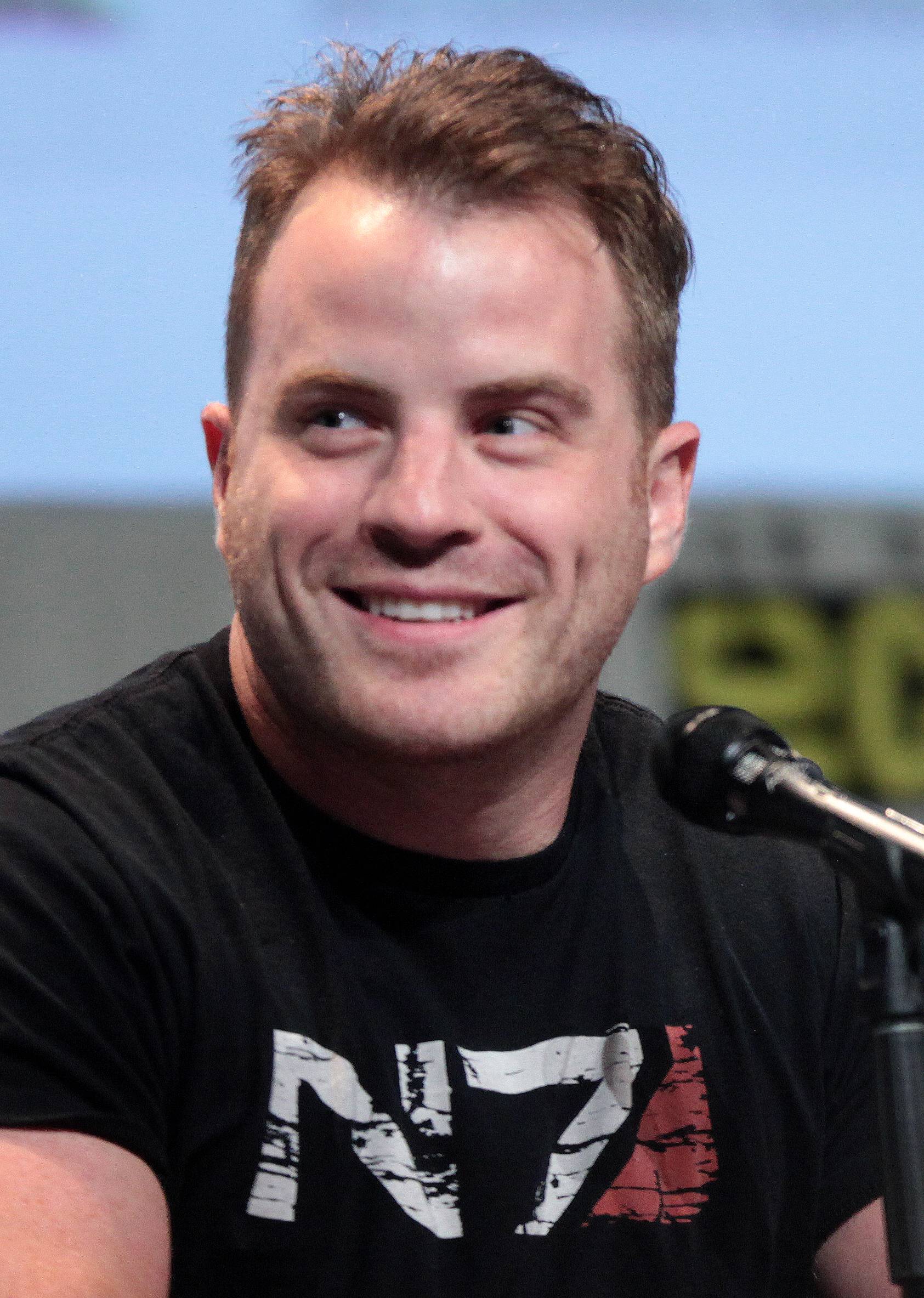
Robert Kazinsky (Sean Slater) was awarded Best Actor in 2009.

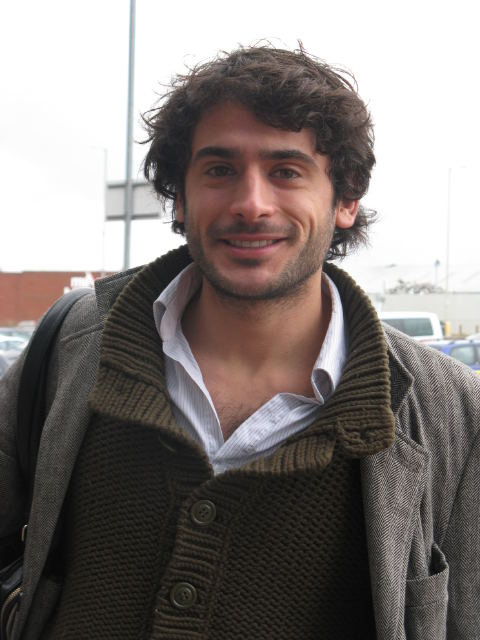
Marc Elliott (Syed Masood) won Best Newcomer at the British Soap Awards in 2010.

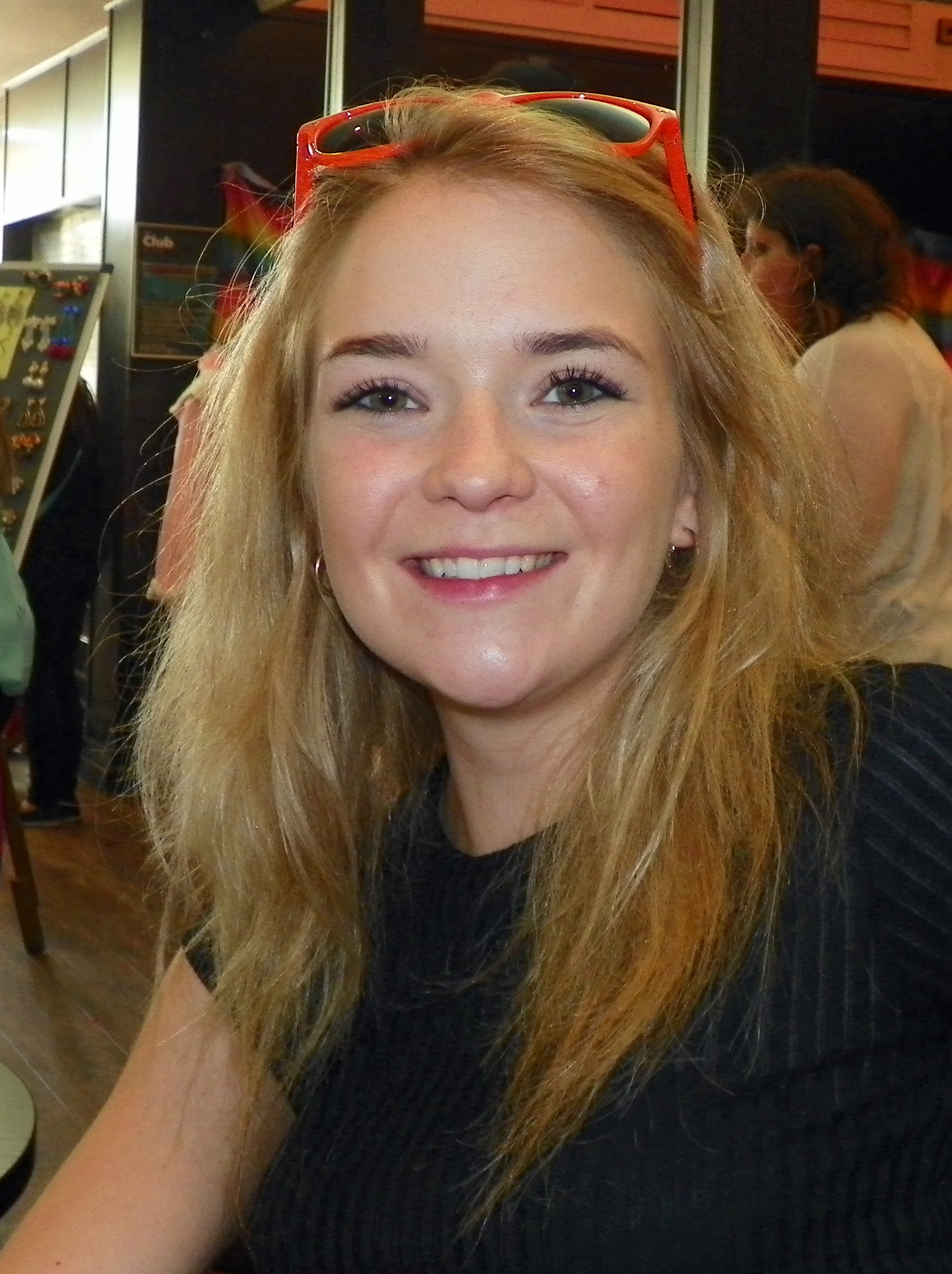
Lorna Fitzgerald (Abi Branning) won Best Young Performance at the British Soap Awards in 2012.

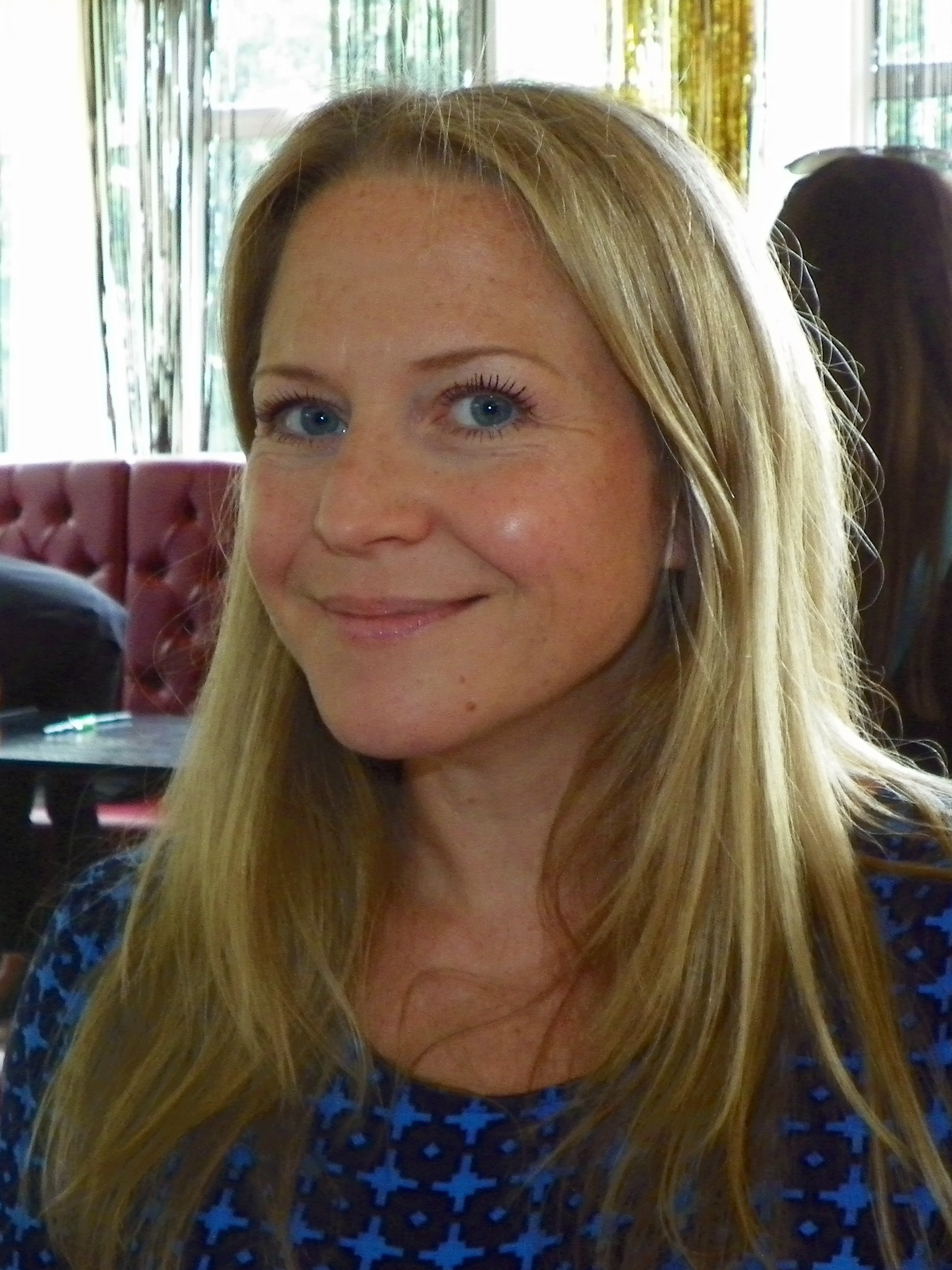
Kellie Bright (Linda Carter) was awarded Best Actress and Best Dramatic Performance in 2015.

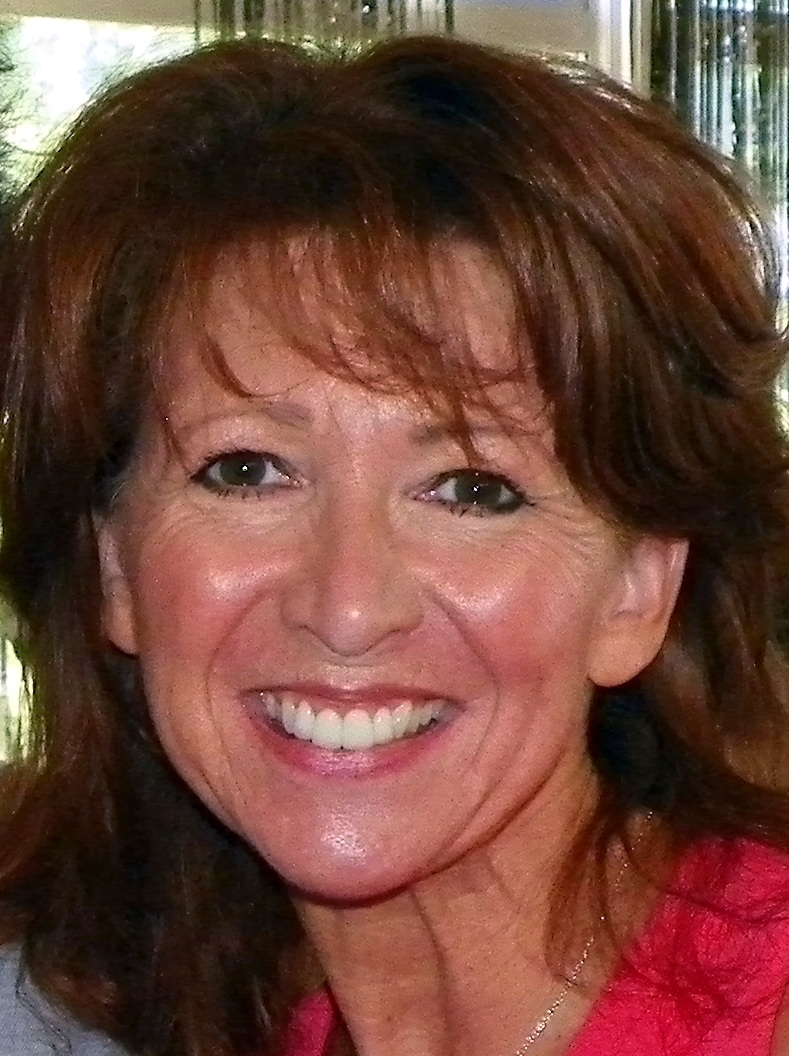
Bonnie Langford (Carmel Kazemi) was awarded Best Newcomer in 2016.

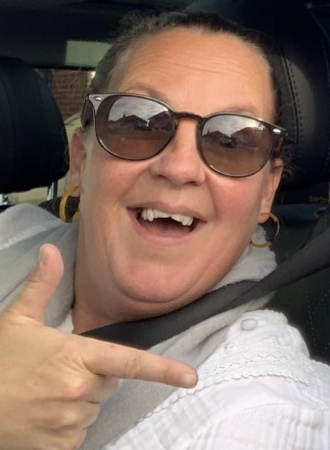
Lorraine Stanley (Karen Taylor) was awarded Best Newcomer in 2018.

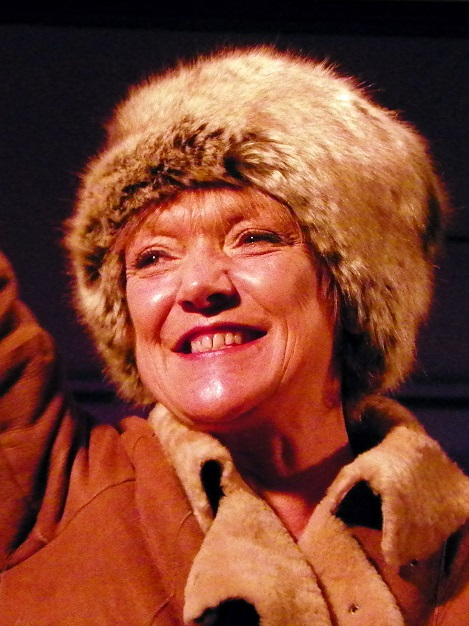
Gillian Wright (Jean Slater) was awarded Best Female Dramatic Performance in 2019.

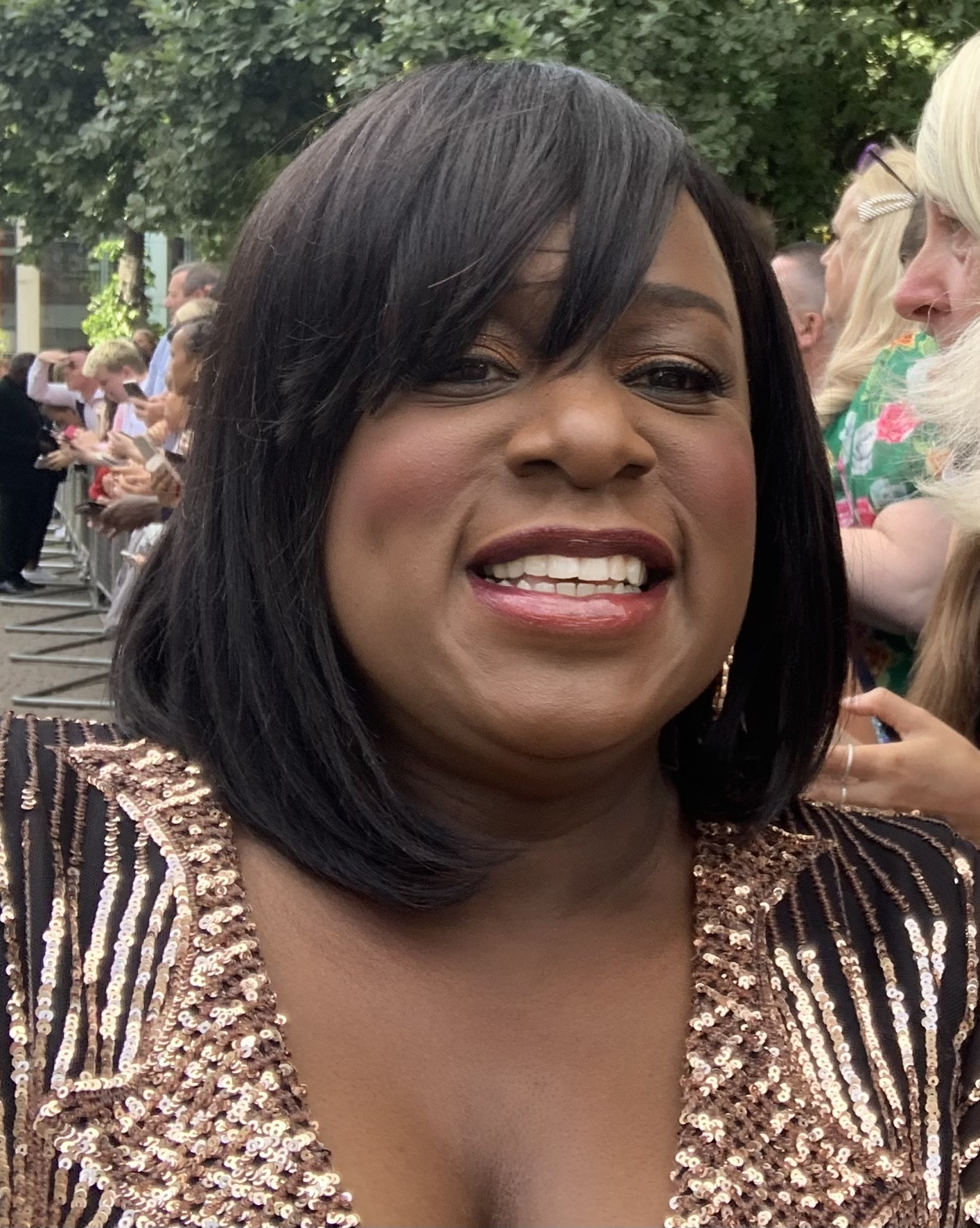
Tameka Empson (Kim Fox) received numerous nominations for Best Comedy Performance before winning in 2022.

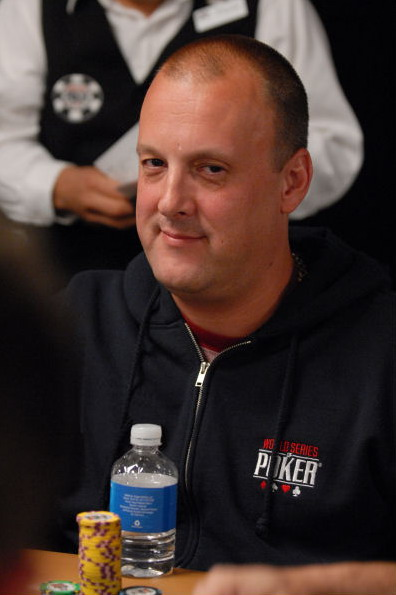
Ross Boatman (Harvey Monroe) was awarded Best Newcomer in 2022.

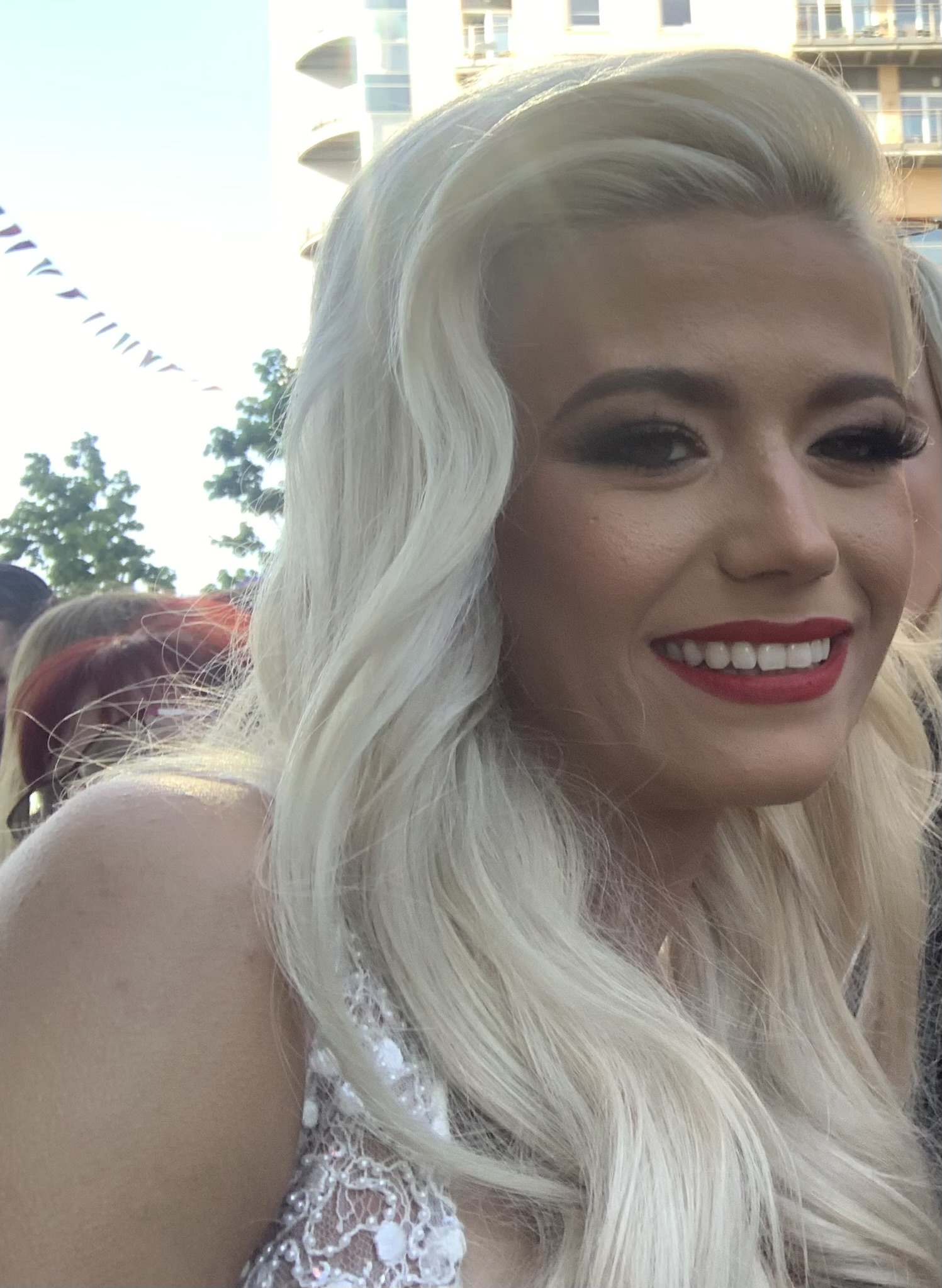
Danielle Harold (Lola Pearce) was awarded Best Leading Performer in 2023.

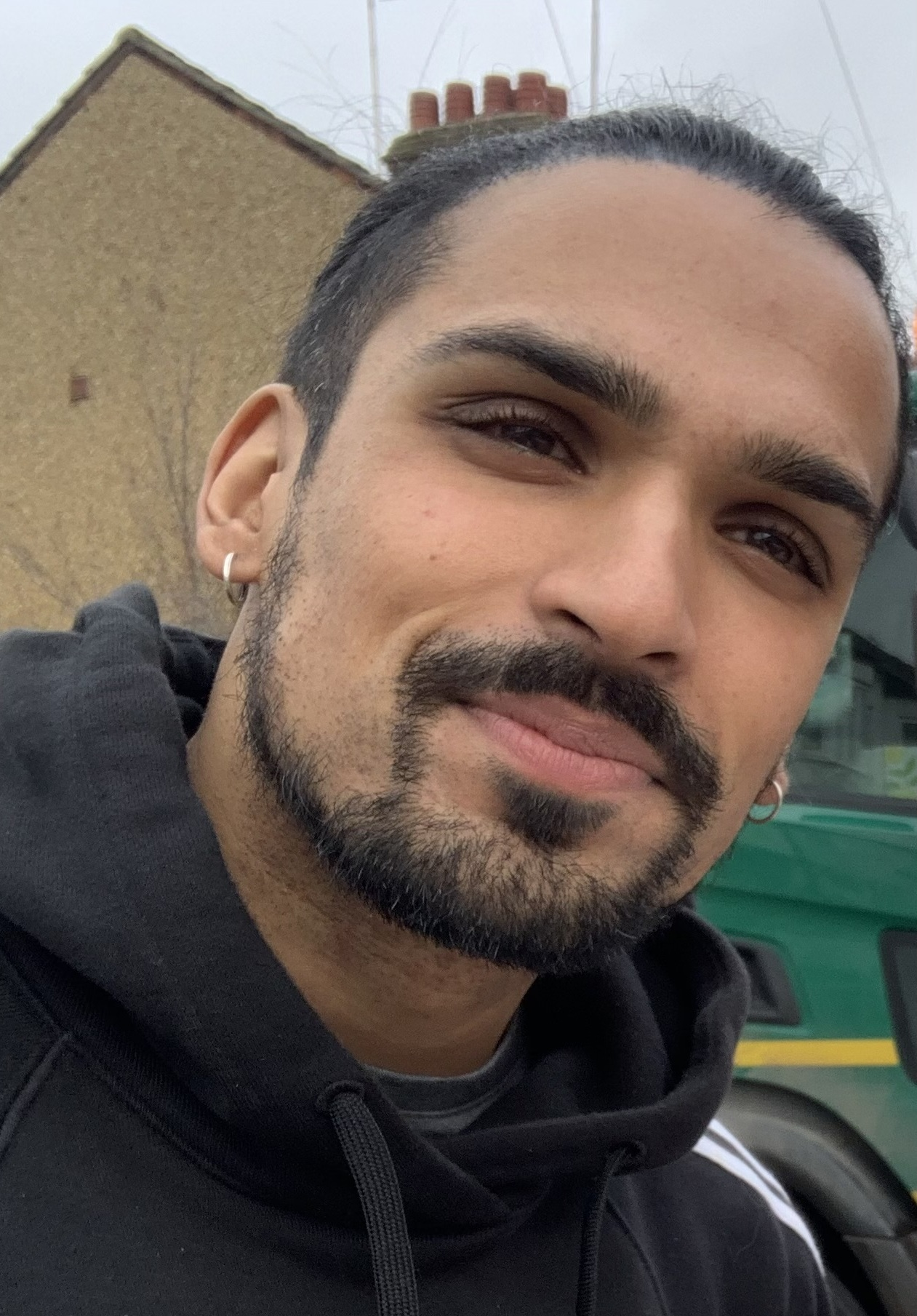
Aaron Thiara (Ravi Gulati) was awarded Villain of the Year in 2023.

Year	Category	Nominee(s)	Result	Ref(s)
1999	Best Actor	Martin Kemp (Steve Owen)	Nominated	
1999	Best Actor	Ross Kemp (Grant Mitchell)	Won	
1999	Best Actress	Patsy Palmer (Bianca Jackson)	Nominated	
1999	Best Actress	Barbara Windsor (Peggy Mitchell)	Won	
1999	Best British Soap	EastEnders	Nominated	
1999	Best Comedy Performance	June Brown (Dot Branning)	Nominated	
1999	Best Newcomer	Jack Ryder (Jamie Mitchell)	Nominated	
1999	Best Storyline	Tiffany discovering her mother Louise's affair with her husband Grant Mitchell	Won	
1999	Sexiest Female	Tamzin Outhwaite (Mel Healy)	Won	
1999	Sexiest Male	Michael Greco (Beppe di Marco)	Won	
1999	Villain of the Year	Martin Kemp (Steve Owen)	Nominated	
1999	Villain of the Year	Ross Kemp (Grant Mitchell)	Nominated	
2000	Best Actor	Joe Absolom (Matthew Rose)	Won	
2000	Best Actress	Patsy Palmer (Bianca Jackson)	Won	
2000	Best British Soap	EastEnders	Won	
2000	Best Dramatic Performance	Lindsey Coulson (Carol Jackson)	Won	
2000	Sexiest Female	Tamzin Outhwaite (Mel Healy)	Won	
2000	Sexiest Male	Michael Greco (Beppe di Marco)	Won	
2000	Villain of the Year	Martin Kemp (Steve Owen)	Won	
2001	Best Actor	Martin Kemp (Steve Owen)	Won	
2001	Best Actress	Natalie Cassidy (Sonia Jackson)	Won	
2001	Best British Soap	EastEnders	Won	
2001	Best Comedy Performance	Shaun Williamson (Barry Evans)	Nominated	
2001	Best Newcomer	Jessie Wallace (Kat Slater)	Won	
2001	Best On-Screen Partnership	Sid Owen and Patsy Palmer (Ricky Butcher and Bianca Jackson)	Nominated	
2001	Sexiest Female	Tamzin Outhwaite (Mel Healy)	Won	
2001	Sexiest Male	Martin Kemp (Steve Owen)	Won	
2001	Villain of the Year	Steve McFadden (Phil Mitchell)	Won	
2002	Best Actor	Perry Fenwick (Billy Mitchell)	Nominated	
2002	Best Actor	Martin Kemp (Steve Owen)	Won	
2002	Best Actor	Steve McFadden (Phil Mitchell)	Nominated	
2002	Best Actress	Kacey Ainsworth (Little Mo Mitchell)	Won	
2002	Best Actress	Tamzin Outhwaite (Mel Owen)	Nominated	
2002	Best Actress	Jessie Wallace (Kat Slater)	Nominated	
2002	Best British Soap	EastEnders	Won	
2002	Best Comedy Performance	John Bardon (Jim Branning)	Nominated	
2002	Best Dramatic Performance	Jessie Wallace (Kat Slater)	Nominated	
2002	Best Exit	Martin Kemp (Steve Owen)	Nominated	
2002	Best Newcomer	Alex Ferns (Trevor Morgan)	Won	
2002	Best On-Screen Partnership	June Brown and John Bardon (Dot and Jim Branning)	Won	
2002	Best Single Episode	Zoe Slater learning that Kat Slater is her mother	Won	
2002	Best Storyline	Zoe Slater learning that Kat Slater is her mother	Nominated	
2002	Hero of the Year	Jessie Wallace (Kat Slater)	Nominated	
2002	Sexiest Female	Jessie Wallace (Kat Slater)	Won	
2002	Sexiest Male	Martin Kemp (Steve Owen)	Won	
2002	Villain of the Year	Alex Ferns (Trevor Morgan)	Won	
2002	Villain of the Year	Steve McFadden (Phil Mitchell)	Nominated	
2002	Special Achievement Award	Tony Holland	Won	
2002	Spectacular Scene of the Year	Steve Owen's car crash	Nominated	
2003	Best Actor	Perry Fenwick (Billy Mitchell)	Nominated	
2003	Best Actor	Alex Ferns (Trevor Morgan)	Nominated	
2003	Best Actor	Steve McFadden (Phil Mitchell)	Nominated	
2003	Best Actress	Kacey Ainsworth (Little Mo Mitchell)	Won	
2003	Best Actress	Natalie Cassidy (Sonia Jackson)	Nominated	
2003	Best Actress	Jessie Wallace (Kat Slater)	Nominated	
2003	Best British Soap	EastEnders	Nominated	
2003	Best Comedy Performance	Shane Richie (Alfie Moon)	Nominated	
2003	Best Dramatic Performance	Natalie Cassidy (Sonia Jackson)	Nominated	
2003	Best Exit	Jack Ryder (Jamie Mitchell)	Nominated	
2003	Best Newcomer	Shane Richie (Alfie Moon)	Nominated	
2003	Best Single Episode	"Halloween Night"	Nominated	
2003	Best Storyline	Trevor Morgan's domestic abuse of his wife Little Mo Morgan	Nominated	
2003	Hero of the Year	Kacey Ainsworth (Little Mo Morgan)	Nominated	
2003	Sexiest Female	Jessie Wallace (Kat Slater)	Won	
2003	Sexiest Male	Shane Richie (Alfie Moon)	Won	
2003	Villain of the Year	Steve McFadden (Phil Mitchell)	Nominated	
2003	Villain of the Year	Alex Ferns (Trevor Morgan)	Nominated	
2004	Best Actor	Perry Fenwick (Billy Mitchell)	Nominated	
2004	Best Actor	Leslie Grantham (Den Watts)	Nominated	
2004	Best Actor	Shane Richie (Alfie Moon)	Won	
2004	Best Actress	Kacey Ainsworth (Little Mo Mitchell)	Nominated	
2004	Best Actress	Letitia Dean (Sharon Rickman)	Nominated	
2004	Best Actress	Jessie Wallace (Kat Slater)	Nominated	
2004	Best British Soap	EastEnders	Won	
2004	Best Comedy Performance	Shane Richie (Alfie Moon)	Nominated	
2004	Best Dramatic Performance	Letitia Dean (Sharon Rickman)	Nominated	
2004	Best Dramatic Performance from a Young Actor or Actress	Natalie Cassidy (Sonia Fowler)	Won	
2004	Best Exit	Shaun Williamson (Barry Evans)	Nominated	
2004	Best Newcomer	Nigel Harman (Dennis Rickman)	Won	
2004	Best On-Screen Partnership	Jessie Wallace and Shane Richie (Kat Slater and Alfie Moon)	Nominated	
2004	Best Single Episode	Den Watts' Return	Nominated	
2004	Sexiest Female	Michelle Ryan (Zoe Slater)	Shortlisted	
2004	Sexiest Female	Jessie Wallace (Kat Slater)	Won	
2004	Sexiest Male	Nigel Harman (Dennis Rickman)	Won	
2004	Soap Bitch of the Year	Charlie Brooks (Janine Butcher)	Nominated	
2004	Villain of the Year	Charlie Brooks (Janine Butcher)	Won	
2004	Villain of the Year	Leslie Grantham (Den Watts)	Nominated	
2004	Villain of the Year	Michael Higgs (Andy Hunter)	Nominated	
2005	Best Actor	Nigel Harman (Dennis Rickman)	Nominated	
2005	Best Actor	Perry Fenwick (Billy Mitchell)	Nominated	
2005	Best Actor	Shane Richie (Alfie Moon)	Won	
2005	Best Actress	Kacey Ainsworth (Little Mo Mitchell)	Nominated	
2005	Best Actress	Michelle Ryan (Zoe Slater)	Nominated	
2005	Best Actress	Jessie Wallace (Kat Slater)	Nominated	
2005	Best British Soap	EastEnders	Nominated	
2005	Best Comedy Performance	Ricky Groves (Garry Hobbs)	Nominated	
2005	Best Dramatic Performance	Gary Beadle (Paul Trueman)	Nominated	
2005	Best Dramatic Performance from a Young Actor or Actress	Lacey Turner (Stacey Slater)	Nominated	
2005	Best Exit	Charlie Brooks (Janine Butcher)	Won	
2005	Best Newcomer	Tracy-Ann Oberman (Chrissie Watts)	Nominated	
2005	Best On-Screen Partnership	June Brown and John Bardon (Dot and Jim Branning)	Won	
2005	Best Single Episode	"Christmas Day"	Nominated	
2005	Lifetime Achievement Award	June Brown (Dot Branning)	Won	
2005	Sexiest Male	Nigel Harman (Dennis Rickman)	Won	
2005	Soap Bitch of the Year	Lacey Turner (Stacey Slater)	Nominated	
2005	Villain of the Year	Tracy-Ann Oberman (Chrissie Watts)	Nominated	
2005	Villain of the Year	Leslie Grantham (Den Watts)	Nominated	
2005	Villain of the Year	Billy Murray (Johnny Allen)	Nominated	
2006	Best Actor	Ross Kemp (Grant Mitchell)	Won	
2006	Best Actor	Steve McFadden (Phil Mitchell)	Nominated	
2006	Best Actor	Shane Richie (Alfie Moon)	Nominated	
2006	Best Actress	Kacey Ainsworth (Little Mo Mitchell)	Nominated	
2006	Best Actress	Lacey Turner (Stacey Slater)	Won	
2006	Best Actress	Jessie Wallace (Kat Slater]])	Nominated	
2006	Best British Soap	EastEnders	Won	
2006	Best Comedy Performance	Ricky Groves (Garry Hobbs)	Nominated	
2006	Best Dramatic Performance	Lacey Turner (Stacey Slater)	Nominated	
2006	Best Dramatic Performance from a Young Actor or Actress	Charlie G. Hawkins (Darren Miller)	Nominated	
2006	Best Exit	Jessie Wallace and Shane Richie (Kat Slater and Alfie Moon)	Nominated	
2006	Best Newcomer	Charlie Clements (Bradley Branning)	Won	
2006	Best Single Episode	Armistice Day episode	Won	
2006	Best Storyline	The Mitchells' return	Nominated	
2006	Sexiest Female	Louisa Lytton (Ruby Allen)	Won	
2006	Soap Bitch of the Year	Tracy-Ann Oberman (Chrissie Watts)	Nominated	
2006	Spectacular Scene of the Year	Skip crashes onto Phil Mitchell's car	Nominated	
2006	Villain of the Year	Billy Murray (Johnny Allen)	Won	
2006	Villain of the Year	Steve McFadden (Phil Mitchell)	Nominated	
2006	Villain of the Year	Tracy-Ann Oberman (Chrissie Watts)	Nominated	
2007	Best Actor	Charlie Clements (Bradley Branning)	Nominated	
2007	Best Actor	Phil Daniels (Kevin Wicks)	Nominated	
2007	Best Actor	Perry Fenwick (Billy Mitchell)	Nominated	
2007	Best Actress	June Brown (Dot Branning)	Nominated	
2007	Best Actress	Diane Parish (Denise Wicks)	Nominated	
2007	Best Actress	Lacey Turner (Stacey Slater)	Nominated	
2007	Best British Soap	EastEnders	Nominated	
2007	Best Comedy Performance	Ricky Groves (Garry Hobbs)	Nominated	
2007	Best Dramatic Performance	Lacey Turner (Stacey Slater)	Won	
2007	Best Dramatic Performance from a Young Actor or Actress	Charlie G. Hawkins (Darren Miller)	Nominated	
2007	Best Storyline	Billy and Honey Mitchell's Down syndrome baby)	Nominated	
2007	Sexiest Female	Lacey Turner (Stacey Slater)	Shortlisted	
2007	Sexiest Male	Robert Kazinsky (Sean Slater)	Shortlisted	
2007	Villain of the Year	Sophie Thompson (Stella Crawford)	Nominated	
2007	Villain of the Year	Robert Kazinsky (Sean Slater)	Nominated	
2007	Villain of the Year	Lee Ross (Owen Turner)	Nominated	
2007	Lifetime Achievement Award	Wendy Richard (Pauline Fowler)	Won	
2007	Special Achievement Award	Tony Jordan	Won	
2008	Best Actor	Charlie Clements (Bradley Branning)	Nominated	
2008	Best Actress	Jo Joyner (Tanya Branning)	Nominated	
2008	Best Actress	Lacey Turner (Stacey Slater)	Nominated	
2008	Best British Soap	EastEnders	Won	
2008	Best Comedy Performance	Cheryl Fergison (Heather Trott)	Nominated	
2008	Best Dramatic Performance	Jo Joyner (Tanya Branning)	Won	
2008	Best Dramatic Performance from a Young Actor or Actress	Jamie Borthwick (Jay Brown)	Won	
2008	Best Exit	Sophie Thompson (Stella Crawford)	Nominated	
2008	Best Newcomer	Stephen Lord (Jase Dyer)	Nominated	
2008	Best Newcomer	Rita Simons (Roxy Mitchell)	Nominated	
2008	Best On-Screen Partnership	Cheryl Fergison and Linda Henry (Heather Trott and Shirley Carter)	Nominated	
2008	Best On-Screen Partnership	Rita Simons and Samantha Janus (Roxy and Ronnie Mitchell)	Nominated	
2008	Best Single Episode	"Christmas Day"	Nominated	
2008	Best Storyline	Aftermath of Max and Stacey Branning's affair	Won	
2008	Sexiest Female	Samantha Janus (Ronnie Mitchell)	Shortlisted	
2008	Sexiest Male	Robert Kazinsky (Sean Slater)	Shortlisted	
2008	Sexiest Male	Scott Maslen (Jack Branning)	Shortlisted	
2008	Villain of the Year	Sophie Thompson (Stella Crawford)	Nominated	
2008	Villain of the Year	Jake Wood (Max Branning)	Nominated	
2008	Spectacular Scene of the Year	Phil Mitchell's car rolling into a lake	Nominated	
2009	Best Actor	Robert Kazinsky (Sean Slater)	Won	
2009	Best Actor	Steve McFadden (Phil Mitchell)	Nominated	
2009	Best Actor	Jake Wood (Max Branning)	Nominated	
2009	Best Actress	Samantha Janus (Ronnie Mitchell)	Nominated	
2009	Best Actress	Jo Joyner (Tanya Branning)	Nominated	
2009	Best Actress	Barbara Windsor (Peggy Mitchell)	Nominated	
2009	Best British Soap	EastEnders	Won	
2009	Best Comedy Performance	Nina Wadia (Zainab Masood)	Won	
2009	Best Dramatic Performance	Patsy Palmer (Bianca Jackson]])	Nominated	
2009	Best Dramatic Performance for a Young Actor or Actress	Maisie Smith (Tiffany Dean)	Won	
2009	Best Newcomer	Shona McGarty (Whitney Dean)	Nominated	
2009	Best On-Screen Partnership	Nitin Ganatra and Nina Wadia (Masood Ahmed and Zainab Masood)	Won	
2009	Best Single Episode	Bianca Jackson discovers the truth about Tony King	Nominated	
2009	Best Storyline	Bianca discovers Tony is a paedophile	Nominated	
2009	Sexiest Female	Kara Tointon (Dawn Swann)	Shortlisted	
2009	Sexiest Female	Lacey Turner (Stacey Slater)	Shortlisted	
2009	Sexiest Male	Robert Kazinsky (Sean Slater)	Shortlisted	
2009	Sexiest Male	Scott Maslen (Jack Branning)	Won	
2009	Villain of the Year	Larry Lamb (Archie Mitchell)	Nominated	
2009	Villain of the Year	John Altman (Nick Cotton)	Nominated	
2009	Villain of the Year	Chris Coghill (Tony King)	Nominated	
2009	Spectacular Scene	The Millers' house explodes	Nominated	
2009	Lifetime Achievement	Barbara Windsor (Peggy Mitchell)	Won	
2010	Best Actor	Nitin Ganatra (Masood Ahmed)	Nominated	
2010	Best Actor	Scott Maslen (Jack Branning)	Won	
2010	Best Actor	Adam Woodyatt (Ian Beale)	Nominated	
2010	Best Actress	Lacey Turner (Stacey Slater)	Won	
2010	Best Actress	Nina Wadia (Zainab Masood)	Nominated	
2010	Best Actress	Barbara Windsor (Peggy Mitchell)	Nominated	
2010	Best British Soap	EastEnders	Won	
2010	Best Comedy Performance	Nina Wadia (Zainab Masood)	Nominated	
2010	Best Dramatic Performance	Lacey Turner (Stacey Slater)	Won	
2010	Best Dramatic Performance for a Young Actor or Actress	Maisie Smith (Tiffany Dean)	Nominated	
2010	Best Exit	Charlie Clements (Bradley Branning)	Won	
2010	Best Newcomer	Marc Elliott (Syed Masood)	Won	
2010	Best On-Screen Partnership	Sid Owen and Patsy Palmer (Ricky Butcher and Bianca Jackson)	Nominated	
2010	Best Single Episode	"EastEnders Live"	Won	
2010	Best Storyline	"Who Killed Archie?"	Won	
2010	Sexiest Female	Preeya Kalidas (Amira Masood)	Shortlisted	
2010	Sexiest Female	Samantha Janus (Ronnie Mitchell)	Shortlisted	
2010	Sexiest Male	John Partridge (Christian Clarke)	Shortlisted	
2010	Sexiest Male	Scott Maslen (Jack Branning)	Won	
2010	Villain of the Year	Chris Coghill (Tony King)	Nominated	
2010	Villain of the Year	Don Gilet (Lucas Johnson)	Nominated	
2010	Villain of the Year	Larry Lamb (Archie Mitchell)	Won	
2011	Best Actor	Nitin Ganatra]] (Masood Ahmed)	Longlisted	
2011	Best Actor	Steve McFadden (Phil Mitchell)	Longlisted	
2011	Best Actor	Shane Richie (Alfie Moon)	Shortlisted	
2011	Best Actress	Lindsey Coulson (Carol Jackson)	Longlisted	
2011	Best Actress	Nina Wadia (Zainab Masood)	Longlisted	
2011	Best Actress	Jessie Wallace (Kat Moon)	Won	
2011	Best British Soap	EastEnders	Won	
2011	Best Comedy Performance	Tameka Empson (Kim Fox)	Nominated	
2011	Best Dramatic Performance	Lindsey Coulson (Carol Jackson)	Nominated	
2011	Best Exit	Lacey Turner (Stacey Branning)	Nominated	
2011	Best Newcomer	Ricky Norwood (Fatboy)	Nominated	
2011	Best On-Screen Partnership	Jessie Wallace and Shane Richie (Kat and Alfie Moon)	Won	
2011	Best Single Episode	Billie Jackson's death	Nominated	
2011	Best Storyline	Ronnie Branning swaps her baby for Kat Moon's	Nominated	
2011	Best Young Performance	Maisie Smith (Tiffany Butcher)	Nominated	
2011	Sexiest Female	Kylie Babbington (Jodie Gold)	Longlisted	
2011	Sexiest Female	Zöe Lucker (Vanessa Gold)	Longlisted	
2011	Sexiest Female	Rita Simons (Roxy Mitchell)	Shortlisted	
2011	Sexiest Male	Marc Elliott (Syed Masood)	Longlisted	
2011	Sexiest Male	Scott Maslen (Jack Branning)	Won	
2011	Sexiest Male	John Partridge (Christian Clarke)	Longlisted	
2011	Spectacular Scene of the Year	The Queen Vic Fire	Nominated	
2011	Villain of the Year	Glynis Barber (Glenda Mitchell)	Longlisted	
2011	Villain of the Year	Charlie Brooks (Janine Malloy)	Shortlisted	
2011	Villain of the Year	Don Gilet (Lucas Johnson)	Shortlisted	
2012	Best Actor	Nitin Ganatra (Masood Ahmed)	Longlisted	
2012	Best Actor	Steve McFadden (Phil Mitchell)	Longlisted	
2012	Best Actor	Shane Richie (Alfie Moon)	Shortlisted	
2012	Best Actress	Lindsey Coulson (Carol Jackson)	Longlisted	
2012	Best Actress	Jo Joyner (Tanya Jessop)	Shortlisted	
2012	Best Actress	Nina Wadia (Zainab Khan)	Shortlisted	
2012	Best British Soap	EastEnders	Won	
2012	Best Comedy Performance	Tameka Empson (Kim Fox)	Nominated	
2012	Best Dramatic Performance	Jo Joyner (Tanya Jessop)	Won	
2012	Best Exit	Pat Evans (Pam St Clement)	Nominated	
2012	Best Newcomer	Jamie Foreman (Derek Branning)	Nominated	
2012	Best On-Screen Partnership	Jake Wood and Jo Joyner (Max Branning and Tanya Jessop)	Won	
2012	Best Storyline	The Brannings deal with Tanya's cancer diagnosis	Nominated	
2012	Best Young Performance	Lorna Fitzgerald (Abi Branning)	Won	
2012	Lifetime Achievement	Pam St Clement (Pat Evans)	Won	
2012	Sexiest Female	Meryl Fernandes (Afia Masood)	Longlisted	
2012	Sexiest Female	Jacqueline Jossa (Lauren Branning)	Shortlisted	
2012	Sexiest Female	Preeya Kalidas (Amira Masood)	Shortlisted	
2012	Sexiest Male	Marc Elliott (Syed Masood)	Longlisted	
2012	Sexiest Male	Scott Maslen (Jack Branning)	Won	
2012	Sexiest Male	John Partridge (Christian Clarke)	Longlisted	
2012	Special Achievement	Simon Ashdown	Won	
2012	Spectacular Scene of the Year	Fire at the B&B	Nominated	
2012	Villain of the Year	Ace Bhatti (Yusef Khan)	Shortlisted	
2012	Villain of the Year	Steve McFadden (Phil Mitchell)	Longlisted	
2012	Villain of the Year	Joshua Pascoe (Ben Mitchell)	Shortlisted	
2013	Best Actor	Perry Fenwick (Billy Mitchell)	Longlisted	
2013	Best Actor	Nitin Ganatra (Masood Ahmed)	Shortlisted	
2013	Best Actor	Shane Richie (Alfie Moon)	Shortlisted	
2013	Best Actress	Diane Parish (Denise Fox)	Longlisted	
2013	Best Actress	Nina Wadia (Zainab Masood)	Shortlisted	
2013	Best Actress	Jessie Wallace (Kat Moon)	Shortlisted	
2013	Best British Soap	EastEnders	Nominated	
2013	Best Comedy Performance	Ricky Norwood (Fatboy)	Nominated	
2013	Best Dramatic Performance	Jo Joyner (Tanya Cross)	Nominated	
2013	Best Exit	Jamie Foreman (Derek Branning)	Nominated	
2013	Best Newcomer	Khali Best (Dexter Hartman)	Nominated	
2013	Best On-Screen Partnership	Nitin Ganatra and Nina Wadia (Masood Ahmed and Zainab Khan)	Nominated	
2013	Best Single Episode	The identity of Kat Moon's lover is revealed	Nominated	
2013	Best Storyline	The Demise of Derek Branning	Nominated	
2013	Best Young Performance	Maisie Smith (Tiffany Butcher)	Nominated	
2013	Lifetime Achievement	Adam Woodyatt (Ian Beale)	Won	
2013	Sexiest Female	Jasmyn Banks (Alice Branning)	Longlisted	
2013	Sexiest Female	Shivani Ghai (Ayesha Rana)	Longlisted	
2013	Sexiest Female	Jacqueline Jossa (Lauren Branning)	Shortlisted	
2013	Sexiest Male	Phaldut Sharma (AJ Ahmed)	Longlisted	
2013	Sexiest Male	Chucky Venn (Ray Dixon)	Longlisted	
2013	Sexiest Male	David Witts (Joey Branning)	Shortlisted	
2013	Spectacular Scene of the Year	The Olympic torch comes live to Walford	Nominated	
2013	Villain of the Year	Jamie Foreman (Derek Branning)	Shortlisted	
2013	Villain of the Year	Gary Lucy (Danny Pennant)	Longlisted	
2013	Villain of the Year	Steve McFadden (Phil Mitchell)	Longlisted	
2014	Best Actor	Danny Dyer (Mick Carter)	Shortlisted	
2014	Best Actor	Nitin Ganatra (Masood Ahmed)	Longlisted	
2014	Best Actor	Adam Woodyatt (Ian Beale)	Longlisted	
2014	Best Actress	Lindsey Coulson (Carol Jackson)	Shortlisted	
2014	Best Actress	Diane Parish (Denise Fox)	Longlisted	
2014	Best Actress	Lacey Turner (Stacey Branning)	Shortlisted	
2014	Best Single Episode	Lucy Beale's Death: The Aftermath	Nominated	
2014	Best British Soap	EastEnders	Nominated	
2014	Best Comedy Performance	Linda Henry (Shirley Carter)	Nominated	
2014	Best Dramatic Performance	Lindsey Coulson (Carol Jackson)	Nominated	
2014	Best Newcomer	Maddy Hill (Nancy Carter)	Won	
2014	Best On-Screen Partnership	Kellie Bright and Danny Dyer (Linda and Mick Carter)	Nominated	
2014	Best Storyline	Hello Stacey, Goodbye Janine	Nominated	
2014	Best Young Performance	Mimi Keene (Cindy Williams)	Nominated	
2014	Outstanding Achievement Award (Off Screen)	Carolyn Weinstein (company manager)	Won	
2014	Sexiest Female	Danielle Harold (Lola Pearce)	Longlisted	
2014	Sexiest Female	Jacqueline Jossa (Lauren Branning)	Shortlisted	
2014	Sexiest Female	Shona McGarty (Whitney Dean)	Longlisted	
2014	Sexiest Male	Khali Best (Dexter Hartman)	Longlisted	
2014	Sexiest Male	Danny Dyer (Mick Carter)	Shortlisted	
2014	Sexiest Male	Ben Hardy (Peter Beale)	Longlisted	
2014	Spectacular Scene of the Year	Johnny Carter comes out to Mick Carter	Nominated	
2014	Villain of the Year	Charlie Brooks (Janine Butcher)	Shortlisted	
2014	Villain of the Year	Daniel Coonan (Carl White)	Longlisted	
2014	Villain of the Year	Cornell S John (Sam James)	Longlisted	
2015	Best Actor	Danny Dyer (Mick Carter)	Shortlisted	
2015	Best Actor	Rudolph Walker (Patrick Trueman)	Longlisted	
2015	Best Actor	Adam Woodyatt (Ian Beale)	Won	
2015	Best Actress	Laurie Brett (Jane Beale)	Shortlisted	
2015	Best Actress	Kellie Bright (Linda Carter)	Won	
2015	Best Actress	Jessie Wallace (Kat Moon)	Longlisted	
2015	Best British Soap	EastEnders	Won	
2015	Best Comedy Performance	Tameka Empson (Kim Fox-Hubbard)	Nominated	
2015	Best Dramatic Performance	Kellie Bright (Linda Carter)	Won	
2015	Best Newcomer	Davood Ghadami (Kush Kazemi)	Nominated	
2015	Best On-Screen Partnership	Laurie Brett and Adam Woodyatt (Jane and Ian Beale)	Won	
2015	Best Single Episode	Episode 5020 – Live Episode	Won	
2015	Best Storyline	Who Killed Lucy?	Won	
2015	Best Young Performance	Eliot Carrington (Bobby Beale)	Nominated	
2015	Outstanding Achievement Award (Off Screen)	Rob Gittins (writer)	Won	
2015	Spectacular Scene of the Year	Kathy comes home	Nominated	
2015	Villain of the Year	John Altman (Nick Cotton)	Nominated	
2016	Best Actor	James Bye (Martin Fowler	Longlisted	
2016	Best Actor	Danny Dyer (Mick Carter)	Shortlisted	
2016	Best Actor	Davood Ghadami (Kush Kazemi)	Longlisted	
2016	Best Actress	Diane Parish (Denise Fox)	Longlisted	
2016	Best Actress	Rakhee Thakrar (Shabnam Masood)	Shortlisted	
2016	Best Actress	Lacey Turner (Stacey Branning)	Won	
2016	Best British Soap	EastEnders	Nominated	
2016	Best Comedy Performance	Tameka Empson (Kim Fox-Hubbard)	Nominated	
2016	Best Female Dramatic Performance	Lacey Turner (Stacey Branning)	Won	
2016	Best Male Dramatic Performance	Steve McFadden (Phil Mitchell)	Nominated	
2016	Best Newcomer	Bonnie Langford (Carmel Kazemi)	Won	
2016	Best Storyline	Stacey Branning's postpartum psychosis	Won	
2016	Best Single Episode	Shabnam Masood's stillbirth	Nominated	
2016	Best On-Screen Partnership	Danny Dyer and Kellie Bright (Mick and Linda Carter)	Nominated	
2016	Best Young Performance	Grace (Janet Mitchell)	Nominated	
2016	Scene of the Year	Mick and Linda Carter finally get married	Nominated	
2016	Outstanding Achievement (On Screen)	Steve McFadden (Phil Mitchell)	Won	
2016	Villain of the Year	Ellen Thomas (Claudette Hubbard)	Nominated	
2017	Best Actor	Danny Dyer (Mick Carter)	Longlisted	
2017	Best Actor	Davood Ghadami (Kush Kazemi)	Longlisted	
2017	Best Actor	Scott Maslen (Jack Branning)	Longlisted	
2017	Best Actress	June Brown (Dot Branning)	Longlisted	
2017	Best Actress	Diane Parish (Denise Fox)	Longlisted	
2017	Best Actress	Lacey Turner (Stacey Fowler)	Shortlisted	
2017	Best British Soap	EastEnders	Nominated	
2017	Best Comedy Performance	Tameka Empson (Kim Fox-Hubbard)	Nominated	
2017	Best Female Dramatic Performance	Diane Parish (Denise Fox)	Nominated	
2017	Best Male Dramatic Performance	Steve McFadden (Phil Mitchell)	Nominated	
2017	Best Newcomer	Zack Morris (Keegan Baker)	Nominated	
2017	Best On-Screen Partnership	James Bye and Lacey Turner (Martin and Stacey Fowler)	Nominated	
2017	Best Single Episode	Lee Carter on the edge	Nominated	
2017	Best Storyline	Lee Carter's mental health	Nominated	
2017	Best Young Performance	Bleu Landau (Dennis Rickman)	Nominated	
2017	Scene of the Year	Ronnie Mitchell and Roxy Mitchell's exit	Nominated	
2017	Tony Warren Award	Gillian Richmond (writer)	Won	
2017	Villain of the Year	Jake Wood (Max Branning)	Nominated	
2018	Best Actor	Richard Blackwood (Vincent Hubbard)	Longlisted	
2018	Best Actor	Danny Dyer (Mick Carter)	Longlisted	
2018	Best Actor	Steve McFadden (Phil Mitchell)	Longlisted	
2018	Best Actress	Letitia Dean (Sharon Mitchell)	Longlisted	
2018	Best Actress	Diane Parish (Denise Fox)	Longlisted	
2018	Best Actress	Lacey Turner (Stacey Fowler)	Nominated	
2018	Best British Soap	EastEnders	Nominated	
2018	Best Comedy Performance	Nitin Ganatra (Masood Ahmed)	Nominated	
2018	Best Female Dramatic Performance	Lacey Turner (Stacey Fowler)	Nominated	
2018	Best Male Dramatic Performance	Jake Wood (Max Branning)	Nominated	
2018	Best Newcomer	Lorraine Stanley (Karen Taylor)	Won	
2018	Best On-Screen Partnership	Lacey Turner and Jake Wood (Stacey Fowler and Max Branning)	Nominated	
2018	Best Single Episode	Max Branning's last stand	Nominated	
2018	Best Storyline	Karma for Max Branning	Nominated	
2018	Best Young Performance	Maisie Smith (Tiffany Butcher)	Nominated	
2018	Greatest Moment	"You Ain't My Mother!" (2001)	Nominated	
2018	Scene of the Year	Lauren and Abi Branning's rooftop fall	Won (joint win with Doctors)	
2018	Outstanding Achievement	Rudolph Walker (Patrick Trueman)	Won	
2018	Villain of the Year	Jake Wood (Max Branning)	Nominated	
2019	Best Actor	Danny Dyer (Mick Carter)	Nominated	
2019	Best Actor	Zack Morris (Keegan Baker)	Nominated	
2019	Best Actor	Danny Walters (Keanu Taylor)	Longlisted	
2019	Best Actress	Louisa Lytton (Ruby Allen)	Longlisted	
2019	Best Actress	Lorraine Stanley ([Karen Taylor)	Shortlisted	
2019	Best Actress	Tamzin Outhwaite (Mel Owen)	Longlisted	
2019	Best British Soap	EastEnders	Nominated	
2019	Best Comedy Performance	Tameka Empson (Kim Fox)	Nominated	
2019	Best Female Dramatic Performance	Gillian Wright (Jean Slater)	Won	
2019	Best Male Dramatic Performance	Zack Morris (Keegan Baker)	Nominated	
2019	Best Newcomer	Ricky Champ (Stuart Highway)	Nominated	
2019	Best On-Screen Partnership	Roger Griffiths and Kara-Leah Fernandes (Mitch and Bailey Baker)	Won	
2019	Best Single Episode	"Consent"	Nominated	
2019	Best Storyline	Knife Crime	Nominated	
2019	Best Young Actor	Kara-Leah Fernandes (Bailey Baker)	Won	
2019	Scene of the Year	Shakil Kazemi's funeral	Nominated	
2019	Villain of the Year	Ricky Champ (Stuart Highway)	Nominated	
2022	Best British Soap	EastEnders	Nominated	
2022	Best Comedy Performance	Tameka Empson (Kim Fox)	Won	
2022	Best Dramatic Performance	Gillian Wright (Jean Slater)	Nominated	
2022	Best Family	The Carters	Nominated	
2022	Best Leading Performer	Zaraah Abrahams (Chelsea Fox)	Longlisted	
2022	Best Leading Performer	Linda Henry (Shirley Carter)	Shortlisted	
2022	Best Leading Performer	Gillian Wright (Jean Slater)	Shortlisted	
2022	Best Newcomer	Ross Boatman (Harvey Monroe)	Won	
2022	Best On-Screen Partnership	Lacey Turner and Gillian Wright (Stacey and Jean Slater)	Won	
2022	Best Single Episode	Jean Slater in Southend	Nominated	
2022	Best Storyline	Jean Slater's bipolar disorder	Nominated	
2022	Best Young Performer	Sonny Kendall (Tommy Moon)	Nominated	
2022	Outstanding Achievement	Letitia Dean (Sharon Watts)	Won	
2022	Scene of the Year	The Hall of Mirrors	Nominated	
2022	Villain of the Year	Toby-Alexander Smith (Gray Atkins)	Nominated	
2023	Best British Soap	EastEnders	Won	
2023	Best Comedy Performance	Reiss Colwell (Jonny Freeman)	Nominated	
2023	Best Dramatic Performance	Danielle Harold (Lola Pearce-Brown)	Nominated	
2023	Best Family	The Slaters	Nominated	
2023	Best Leading Performer	Jamie Borthwick (Jay Brown)	Longlisted	
2023	Best Leading Performer	James Farrar (Zack Hudson)	Longlisted	
2023	Best Leading Performer	Danielle Harold (Lola Pearce-Brown)	Won	
2023	Best Leading Performer	Shona McGarty (Whitney Dean)	Shortlisted	
2023	Best Leading Performer	Diane Parish (Denise Fox)	Longlisted	
2023	Best Newcomer	Aaron Thiara (Ravi Gulati)	Nominated	
2023	Best On-Screen Partnership	Jamie Borthwick and Danielle Harold (Jay and Lola Pearce-Brown)	Nominated	
2023	Best Single Episode	Goodbye Dot	Nominated	
2023	Best Storyline	Loving and Losing Lola	Nominated	
2023	Best Young Performer	Lillia Turner (Lily Slater)	Won	
2023	Scene of the Year	Whitney and Zack say goodbye to Peach	Nominated	
2023	Villain of the Year	Aaron Thiara (Ravi Gulati)	Won	

== Broadcast Awards ==
The Broadcast Awards are run by Broadcast magazine. They recognise and reward excellence in and around the UK television programming industry. EastEnders has won the Best Soap/Continuing Drama accolade once.

Year	Category	Nominee(s)	Result	Ref(s)
2011	Best Soap/Continuing Drama	EastEnders	Nominated	
2012	Best Soap/Continuing Drama	EastEnders	Nominated	
2013	Best Soap/Continuing Drama	EastEnders	Nominated	
2014	Best Soap/Continuing Drama	EastEnders	Nominated	
2015	Best Soap/Continuing Drama	EastEnders	Won	
2016	Best Soap/Continuing Drama	EastEnders	Nominated	
2017	Best Soap/Continuing Drama	EastEnders	Nominated	
2018	Best Soap/Continuing Drama	EastEnders	Nominated	
2019	Best Soap/Continuing Drama	EastEnders	Nominated	
2020	Best Soap/Continuing Drama	EastEnders	Nominated	
2021	Best Soap/Continuing Drama	EastEnders	Nominated	
2022	Best Soap/Continuing Drama	EastEnders	Nominated	
2023	Best Soap/Continuing Drama	EastEnders	Nominated	
2024	Best Soap/Continuing Drama	EastEnders	Nominated	

== Digital Spy Awards ==
Entertainment website Digital Spy hosted the Digital Spy Soap Awards in 2008, where EastEnders won 7 of the 14 categories. From 2014, Digital Spy held the Digital Spy Reader Awards. In 2014, EastEnders won all five awards in the soaps category.

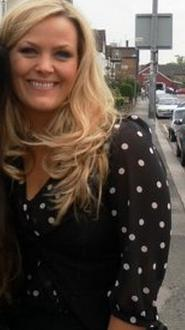
Jo Joyner won Digital Spy's Most Popular Actress award in 2008.

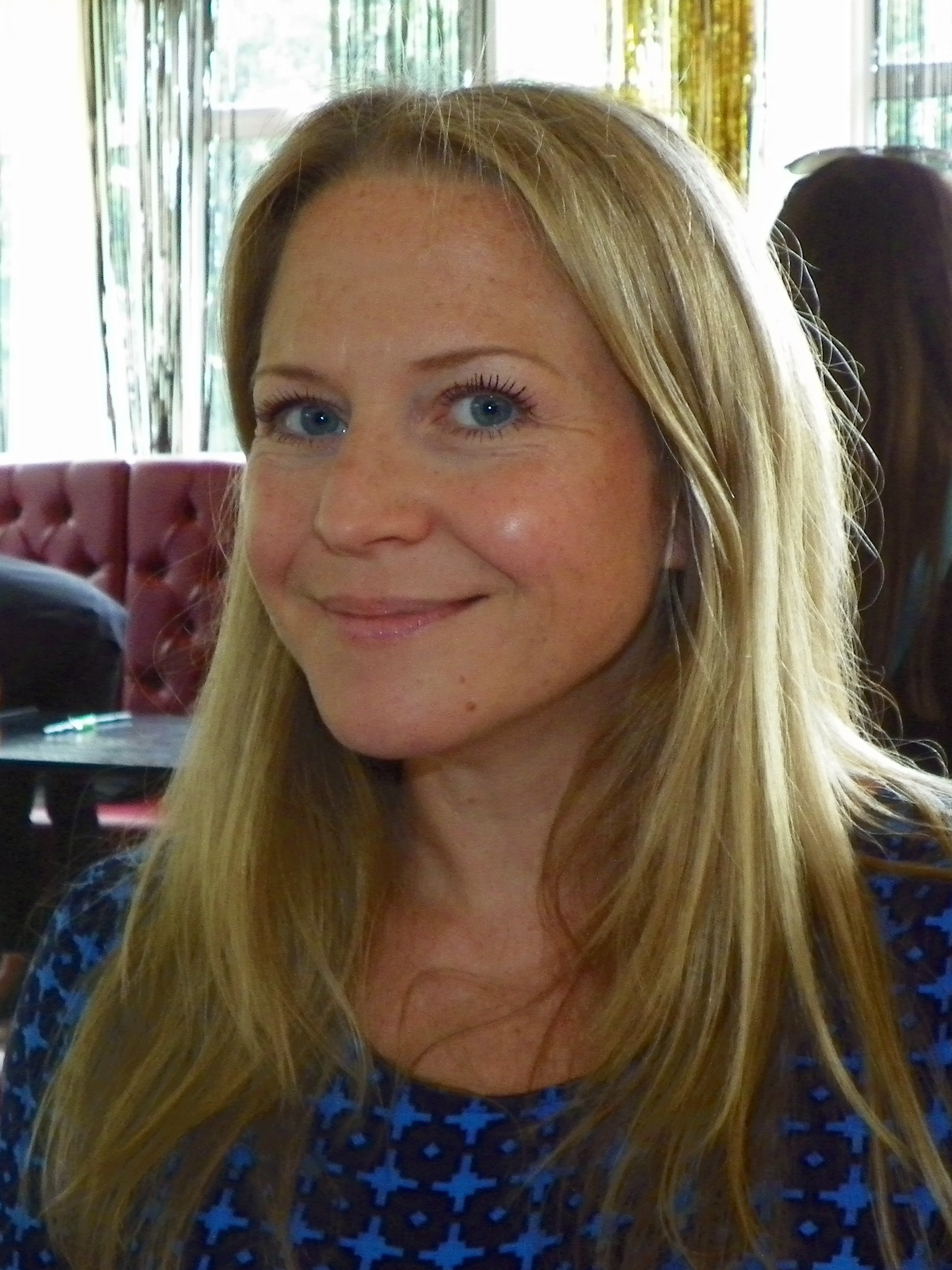
Kellie Bright won Digital Spy's Best Female Soap Actor award in 2014.

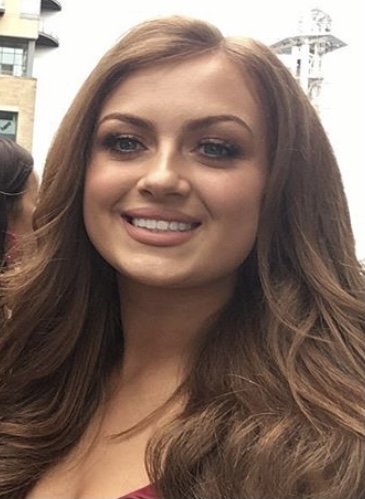
Maisie Smith was nominated for Digital Spy's Best Female Soap Actor award in 2019.

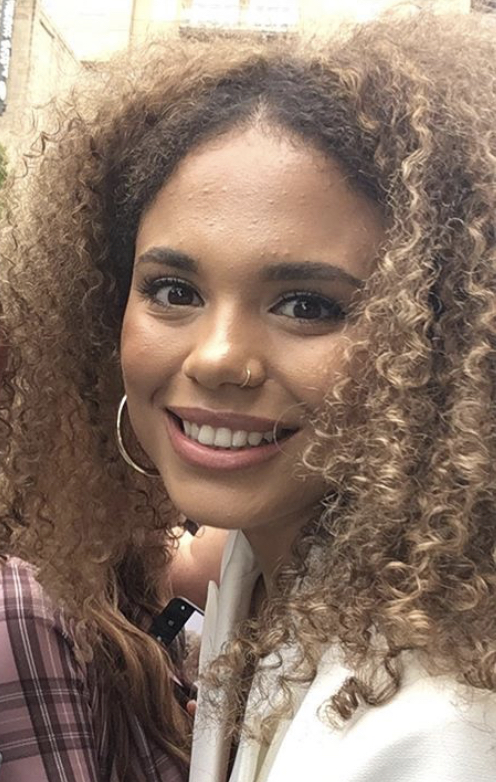
Jessica Plummer won Digital Spy's Best Female Soap Actor award in 2020.

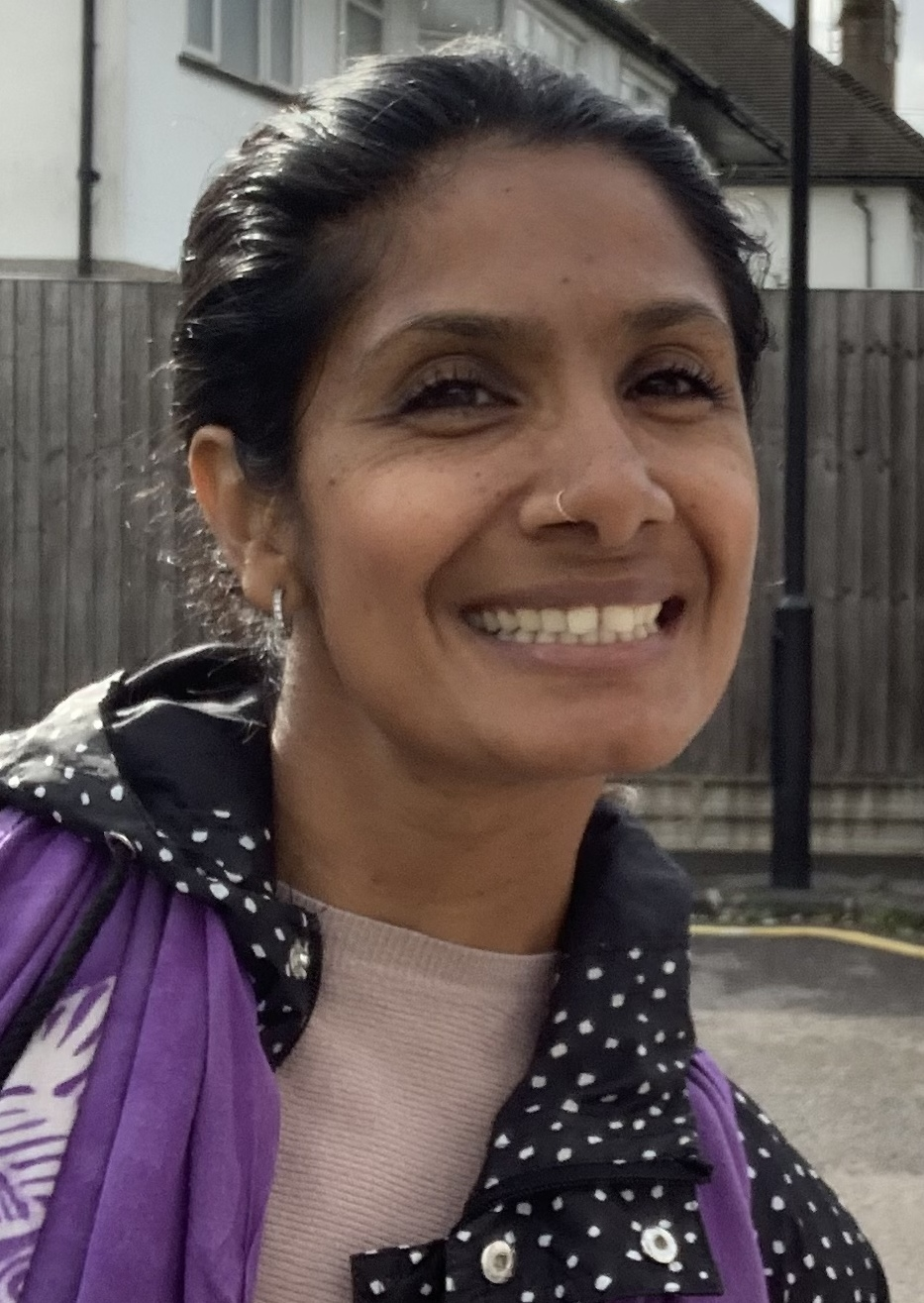
Balvinder Sopal won Digital Spy's Best Actor award in 2024.

Year	Category	Nominee(s)	Result	Ref(s)
2008	Best Child Actor (Under 16)	Jamie Borthwick (Jay Brown)	Nominated	
2008	Best Child Actor (Under 16)	Melissa Suffield (Lucy Beale)	Nominated	
2008	Best Exit	Amanda Drew (May Wright)	Nominated	
2008	Best Exit	Sophie Thompson (Stella Crawford)	Nominated	
2008	Best Newcomer	Cheryl Fergison (Heather Trott)	Nominated	
2008	Best Newcomer	Rita Simons (Roxy Mitchell)	Won	
2008	Best On-Screen Partnership	Linda Henry & Cheryl Fergison (Shirley Carter & Heather Trott)	Nominated	
2008	Best On-Screen Partnership	Rita Simons & Samantha Janus (Roxy & Ronnie Mitchell)	Won	
2008	Best Pet	Wellard the dog	Won	
2008	Best Single Episode	Phil Mitchell & Stella Crawford's wedding	Won	
2008	Best Single Episode	The Queen Victoria Raid	Nominated	
2008	Best Soap	EastEnders	Won	
2008	Most Popular Actor	Charlie Clements (Bradley Branning)	Nominated	
2008	Most Popular Actor	Adam Woodyatt (Ian Beale)	Nominated	
2008	Most Popular Actress	Jo Joyner (Tanya Branning)	Won	
2008	Most Popular Actress	Lacey Turner (Stacey Slater)	Nominated	
2008	Storyline of the Year	Max Branning & Stacey Slater's affair	Nominated	
2008	Storyline of the Year	Ian Beale's Stalking & the return of Steven Beale	Nominated	
2008	Villain of the Year	Sophie Thompson (Stella Crawford)	Nominated	
2008	Villain of the Year	Jake Wood (Max Branning)	Nominated	
2009	Soap Icon	Barbara Windsor (Peggy Mitchell)	Won	
2009	Soap of the Year	EastEnders	Won	
2011	Best Female Soap Actress	Jo Joyner (Tanya Branning)	Won	
2011	Best Male Soap Actor	Jake Wood (Max Branning)	3rd	
2011	Most Entertaining Soap Character	Kim Fox (Tameka Empson)	Won	
2011	Best Soap Storyline	Max & Tanya Branning's journey	2nd	
2011	Best Soap	Eastenders	Won	
2012	Best Female Soap Actor	Charlie Brooks (Janine Butcher)	Won	
2012	Best Female Soap Actor	Jo Joyner (Tanya Branning)	4th	
2012	Best Male Soap Actor	Jake Wood (Max Branning)	3rd	
2012	Best Male Soap Actor	Steve McFadden (Phil Mitchell)	4th	
2012	Best Soap Storyline	Heather Trott's murder	2nd	
2012	Best Soap	Eastenders	Won	
2013	Best Female Soap Actor	Charlie Brooks (Janine Butcher)	2nd	
2013	Best Female Soap Actor	Jacqueline Jossa (Lauren Branning)	3rd	
2013	Best Male Soap Actor	Jake Wood (Max Branning)	4th	
2013	Best Soap Storyline	Michael Moon's murder	5th	
2013	Best Soap	Eastenders	2nd	
2014	Best Female Soap Actor	Kellie Bright (Linda Carter)	Won	
2014	Best Female Soap Actor	Lindsey Coulson (Carol Jackson)	Nominated	
2014	Best Male Soap Actor	Danny Dyer (Mick Carter)	Won	
2014	Best Male Soap Actor	Adam Woodyatt (Ian Beale)	Nominated	
2014	Best Soap	EastEnders	Won	
2014	Best Soap Newcomer	Declan Bennett (Charlie Cotton)	Nominated	
2014	Best Soap Newcomer	Maddy Hill (Nancy Carter)	Won	
2014	Best Soap Storyline	Linda's Rape Ordeal	Nominated	
2014	Best Soap Storyline	Who Killed Lucy Beale?	Won	
2015	Best Soap	Eastenders	2nd	
2015	Best Actor	Adam Woodyatt (Ian Beale)	2nd	
2015	Best Actor	Rakhee Thakrar (Shabnam Masood)	3rd	
2015	Best Newcomer	Jonny Labey (Paul Coker)	2nd	
2015	Best Storyline	Lucy Beale's killer revealed	Won	
2015	Best Cliffhanger	Bobby Beale killed Lucy	2nd	
2015	Best LOL Moment	Jo Joyner (Tanya Branning)	Won	
2015	Best Performance by an Animal	Lady Di (dog)	Won	
2015	Best Performance by an Animal	Craig Revel Horwood (cat)	2nd	
2016	Best Actor	Steve McFadden (Phil Mitchell)	3rd	
2016	Best Actress	Lacey Turner (Stacey Branning)	3rd	
2016	Best Newcomer	Shaheen Jafargholi (Shakil Kazemi)	3rd	
2016	Biggest OMG Moment	Paul Coker's death	3rd	
2016	Best Ship	Danny Dyer & Kellie Bright (Mick & Linda Carter)	3rd	
2016	Best Soap	EastEnders	3rd	
2016	Best Storyline	Stacey Branning's postpartum psychosis	3rd	
2016	Biggest Unsung Hero	Jamie Borthwick (Jay Brown)	2nd	
2016	Funniest Character	Kim Fox (Tameka Empson)	Won	
2017	Best Soap	Eastenders	2nd	
2017	Best Actor	Danny Dyer (Mick Carter)	3rd	
2017	Best Actor	Jake Wood (Max Branning)	5th	
2017	Best Actress	Lacey Turner (Stacey Branning)	3rd	
2017	Best Actress	Diane Parish (Denise Fox)	7th	
2017	Best Soap Newcomer	Zack Morris (Keegan Baker)	2nd	
2017	Best Soap Villain	Jake Wood (Max Branning)	3rd	
2017	Funniest Soap Character	Tameka Empson (Kim Fox)	2nd	
2017	Best Soap Couple	Lacey Turner & James Bye (Stacey Branning & Martin Fowler)	3rd	
2017	Best Soap Storyline	Max Branning's revenge	3rd	
2017	Best Soap Stunt	The bus crash	2nd	
2017	Biggest OMG Soap Moment	James Willmott-Brown returns	3rd	
2018	Best Soap Actor (Female)	Bonnie Langford (Carmel Kazemi)	5th	
2018	Best Soap Actor (Female)	Louisa Lytton (Ruby Allen)	4th	
2018	Best Soap Actor (Male)	Zack Morris (Keegan Baker)	8th	
2018	Best Soap Actor (Male)	Danny Dyer (Mick Carter)	7th	
2018	Best Soap Couple	Sharon Mitchell & Keanu Taylor (Letitia Dean) & Danny Walters)	9th	
2018	Best Soap Couple	Danny Dyer & Kellie Bright (Mick & Linda Carter)	2nd	
2018	Best Soap (Evening)	EastEnders	3rd	
2018	Best Soap Newcomer	Tony Clay (Halfway)	7th	
2018	Best Soap Newcomer	Katie Jarvis (Hayley Slater)	3rd	
2018	Best Soap Storyline	Ruby Allen's sexual consent story	5th	
2018	Best Soap Storyline	"Who shot Stuart Highway?"	9th	
2018	Biggest OMG Soap Moment	Alfie Moon (Shane Richie) is the father of Hayley Slater's (Katie Jarvis) baby	5th	
2018	Biggest OMG Soap Moment	Stuart Highway (Ricky Champ) shoots himself	10th	
2018	Most Bizarre Soap Storyline	Mo Harris (Laila Morse) pretends Kat Moon (Jessie Wallace) is dead	3rd	
2018	Most Bizarre Soap Storyline	"The heist saga"	6th	
2018	Most Devastating Soap Death	Abi Branning (Lorna Fitzgerald)	7th	
2018	Most Devastating Soap Death	Shaheen Jafargholi (Shakil Kazemi)	3rd	
2019	Best Evening Soap	EastEnders	3rd	
2019	Best Soap Actor (Female)	Maisie Smith (Tiffany Butcher)	4th	
2019	Best Soap Actor (Male)	Max Bowden (Ben Mitchell	4th	
2019	Best Soap Couple	Max Bowden & Tony Clay (Ben Mitchell & Callum Highway)	3rd	
2019	Best Soap Newcomer	Jessica Plummer (Chantelle Atkins)	2nd	
2019	Best Soap Storyline	Ruby Allen's consent story	4th	
2019	OMG Soap Moment	Hunter (Charlie Winter) is shot	2nd	
2020	Best Evening Soap	EastEnders	Won	
2020	Best Newcomer	Rose Ayling-Ellis (Frankie Lewis)	3rd	
2020	Best Newcomer	Balvinder Sopal (Suki Panesar)	2nd	
2020	Best Soap Actor (Female)	Jessica Plummer (Chantelle Atkins)	Won	
2020	Best Soap Actor (Male)	Max Bowden (Ben Mitchell)	Won	
2020	Best Soap Couple	Max Bowden & Tony Clay (Ben Mitchell & Callum Highway)	Won	
2020	Best Storyline	Gray & Chantelle's domestic abuse	2nd	
2020	Most Devastating Death	Jessica Plummer (Chantelle Atkins)	Won	
2020	Most Devastating Death	Dennis Rickman (Bleu Landau)	3rd	
2020	OMG Moment	Dennis dies on the boat	Won	
2021	Best Actor (Female)	Balvinder Sopal (Suki Panesar)	3rd	
2021	Best Soap Actor (Male)	Stevie Basaula (Isaac Baptiste)	3rd	
2021	Best Soap Actor (Male)	Danny Dyer (Mick Carter)	2nd	
2021	Best Evening Soap	EastEnders	Won	
2021	Best Soap Couple	Max Bowden & Tony Clay (Ben Mitchell & Callum Highway)	Won	
2021	Best Soap Newcomer	James Farrar (Zack Hudson)	Won	
2021	Best Soap Newcomer	Barbara Smith (Dana Monroe)	3rd	
2021	Best Soap Storyline	Isaac's schizophrenia	2nd	
2021	Most Devastating Soap Death	Davood Ghadami (Kush Kazemi)	2nd	
2021	OMG Soap Moment	Baby Alyssa is Dennis'	3rd	
2022	Best Actor (Female)	Zaraah Abrahams (Chelsea Fox)	2nd	
2022	Best Actor (Female)	Danielle Harold (Lola Pearce)	Won	
2022	Best Soap Actor (Male)	Jamie Borthwick (Jay Brown)	Won	
2022	Best Soap Actor (Male)	Jaz Deol (Kheerat Panesar)	2nd	
2022	Best Evening Soap	EastEnders	Won	
2022	Best Soap Couple	Max Bowden & Tony Clay (Ben Mitchell & Callum Highway)	Won	
2022	Best Soap Couple	Balvinder Sopal & Heather Peace (Suki Panesar and Eve Unwin)	2nd	
2022	Best Soap Newcomer	Matthew James Morrison (Felix Baker)	2nd	
2022	Best Soap Newcomer	Aaron Thiara (Ravi Gulati)	Won	
2022	Best Soap Storyline	Jean Slater's breakdown	3rd	
2022	Best Soap Storyline	Lola's cancer	Won	
2022	OMG Soap Moment	Janine frames Linda for the car accident	Won	
2022	OMG Soap Moment	Ravi murders Ranveer	2nd	
2023	Best Evening Soap	Eastenders	Won	
2023	Best Actor	Danielle Harold (Lola Pearce)	Won	
2023	Best Actor	Lacey Turner (Stacey Slater)	2nd	
2023	Best Actor	Jamie Borthwick (Jay Brown)	3rd	
2023	Best Actor	Balvinder Sopal (Suki Panesar)	4th	
2023	Best Actor	Shona McGarty (Whitney Dean)	5th	
2023	Rising Star	Sophie Khan Levy (Priya Nandra-Hart)	Won	
2023	Best Soap Couple	Balvinder Sopal & Heather Pearce (Suki Panesar & Eve Unwin)	Won	
2023	Best Soap Couple	Danielle Harold & Jamie Borthwick (Lola Pearce & Jay Brown)	2nd	
2023	Best Soap Storyline	Loving and losing Lola	Won	
2023	Best Soap Storyline	The Six's death mystery	2nd	
2023	OMG Soap Moment	Cindy, Ian, & Peter Beale (& Lauren Branning) all return	Won	
2023	Best Ever Xmas Soap Storyline	Max Branning & Stacey Slater's affair revealed (2007)	Won	
2023	Best Ever Xmas Soap Storyline	Den serves Angie Watts with divorce papers (1986)	2nd	
2023	Best Ever Xmas Soap Storyline	Lauren & Abi Branning fall from The Vic's roof (2017)	3rd	
2024	Best Actor	Balvinder Sopal (Suki Panesar)	Won	
2024	Best Evening Soap	EastEnders	2nd	
2024	Best Soap Couple	Balvinder Sopal & Heather Peace (Suki Panesar & Eve Unwin)	2nd	
2024	Best Soap Couple	Jessie Wallace & Shane Richie (Kat Slater and Alfie Moon)	3rd	
2024	Best Soap Couple	Angela Wynter & Rudolph Walker (Yolande and Patrick Trueman)	5th	
2024	Best Soap Storyline	The Six cover up Keanu's death	Won	
2024	Best Soap Storyline	Yolande Trueman's sexual assault	4th	
2024	OMG Soap Moment	Jake Moon returns for Chrissie Watts	3rd	
2024	OMG Soap Moment	Reiss kills his wife Debbie	4th	
2024	Rising Star	Sophie Khan Levy (Priya Nandra-Hart)	2nd	
2024	Rising Star	Elijah Holloway (Harry Mitchell)	5th	
2024	Saddest Soap Moment	Gloria Knight's death	4th	

=== Digital Spy 20th Anniversary Reader Awards ===
In 2019, Digital Spy celebrated its 20th year. So it held a vote for readers to choose the best of Film & TV from the last two decades.

Year	Category	Nominated for	Result	Ref.
2019	Best TV moment of the past 20 years	"You ain't my muvva!" "Yes I am!" (Michelle Ryan & Jessie Wallace)	Won	
2019	Best soap star of the past 20 years	Lacey Turner (Stacey Slater)	3rd	
2019	Best soap star of the past 20 years	Steve McFadden (Phil Mitchell)	4th	
2019	Best soap star of the past 20 years	June Brown (Dot Branning)	5th	

== Inside Soap Awards ==
The Inside Soap Awards are voted for by readers of Inside Soap magazine. EastEnders won the Best British Soap award ten years running from 1997 to 2006. It lost out in 2007 to Coronation Street but won the award again every year from 2008 to 2012. Lacey Turner has won the Best Actress award for her role as Stacey Slater four times.

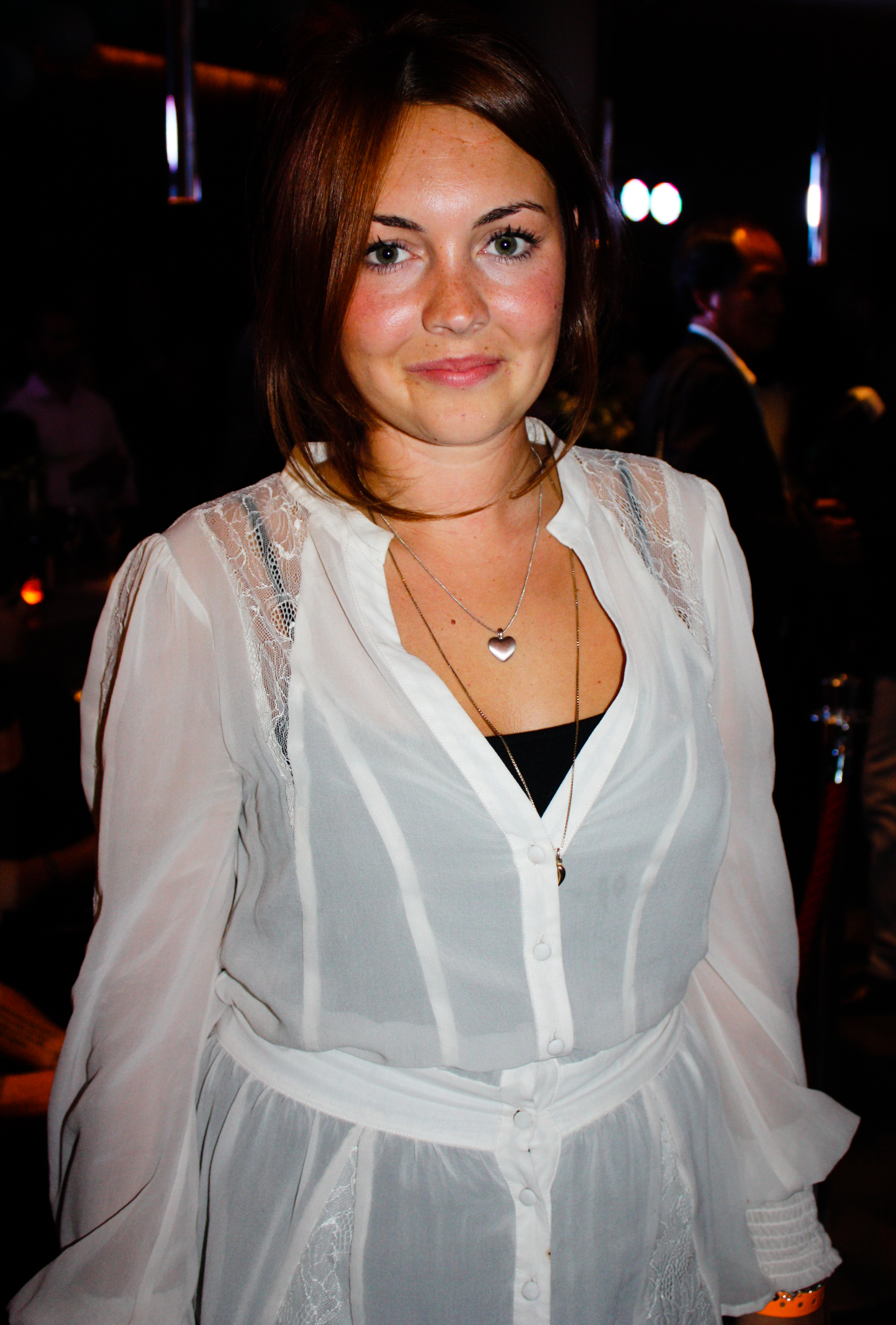
Lacey Turner (Stacey Slater) has been awarded Best Actress four times.

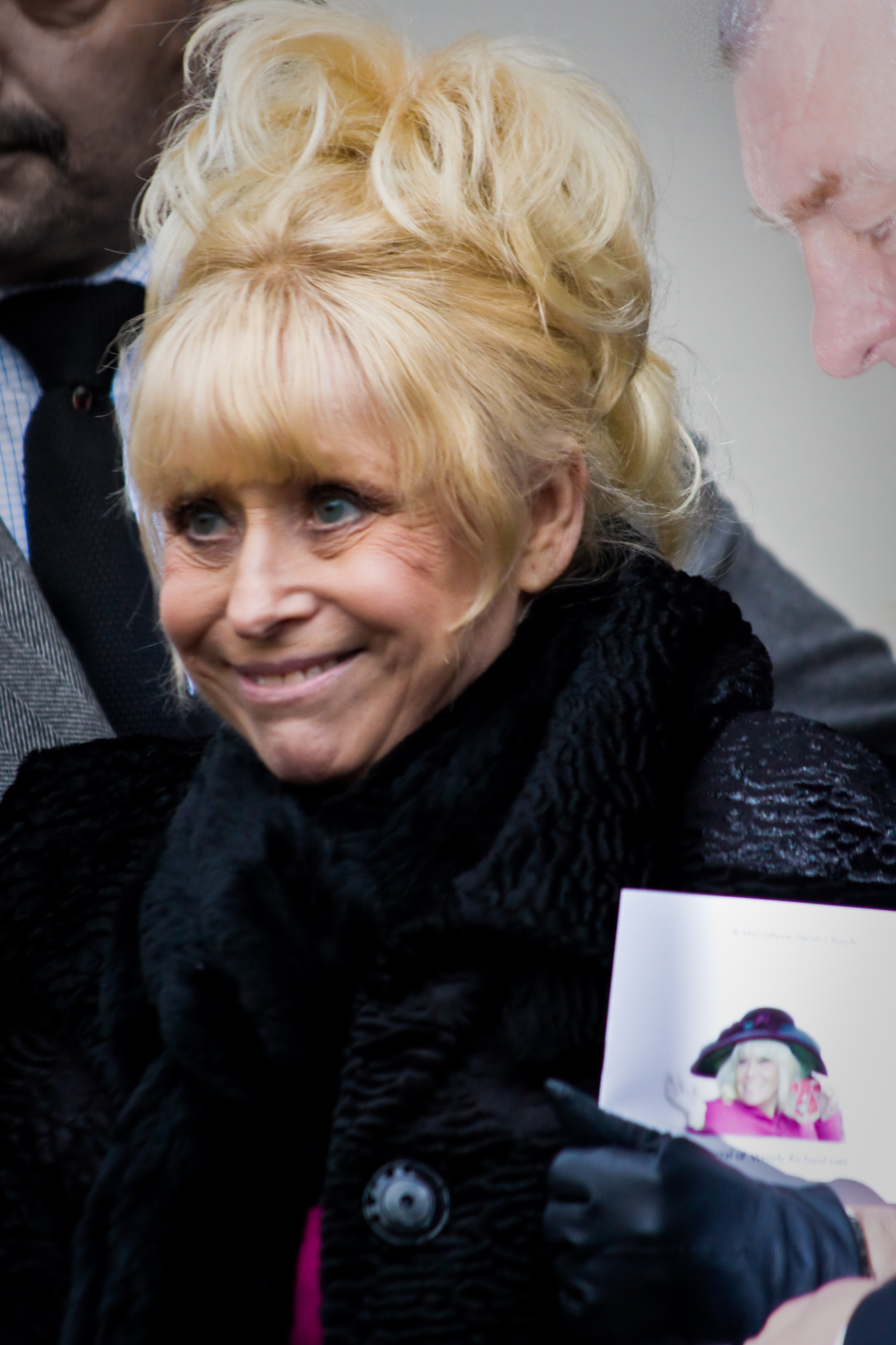
Barbara Windsor (Peggy Mitchell) won an Inside Soap Lifetime Achievement Award in 2001.

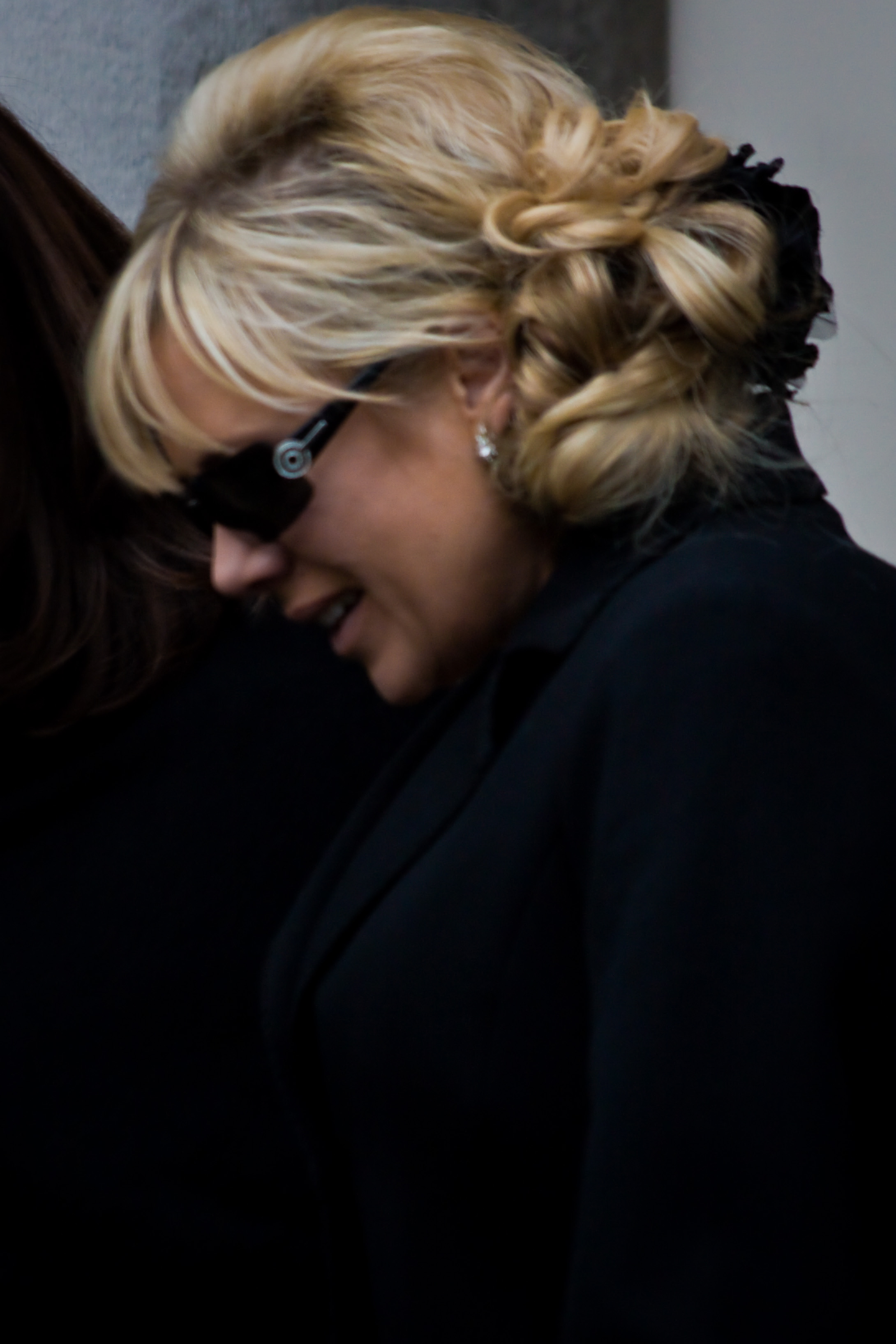
Letitia Dean (Sharon Watts) won an Inside Soap Lifetime Achievement Award in 2005.

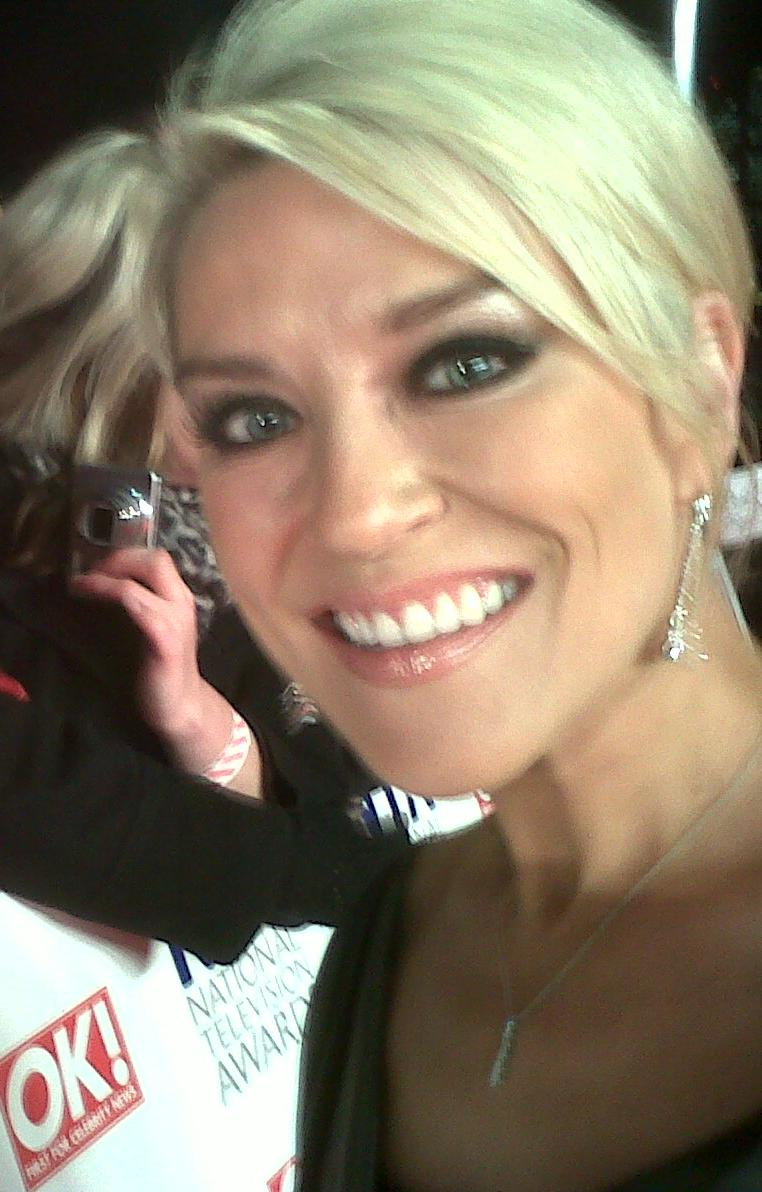
Zöe Lucker (Vanessa Gold) was nominated for Best Newcomer at the Inside Soap Awards in 2010.

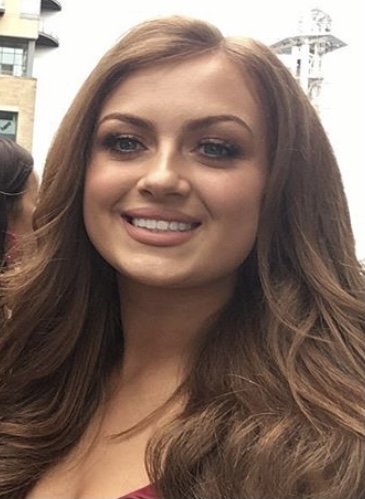
Maisie Smith (Tiffany Butcher) won the award for Best Young Acto" at the Inside Soap Awards in 2011.

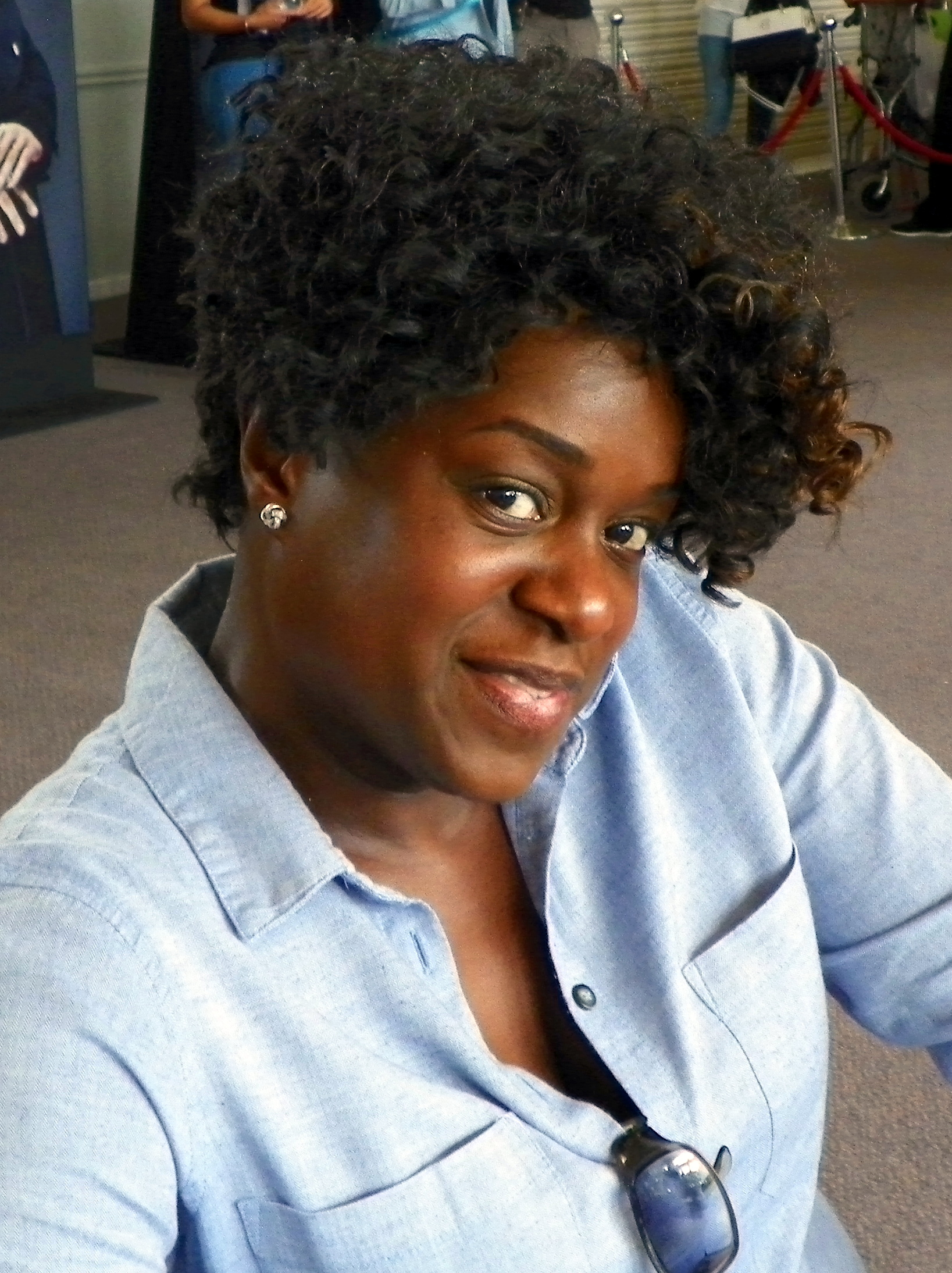
Tameka Empson (Kim Fox) won the award for Funniest Female at the Inside Soap Awards in 2013, 2015 and 2016.

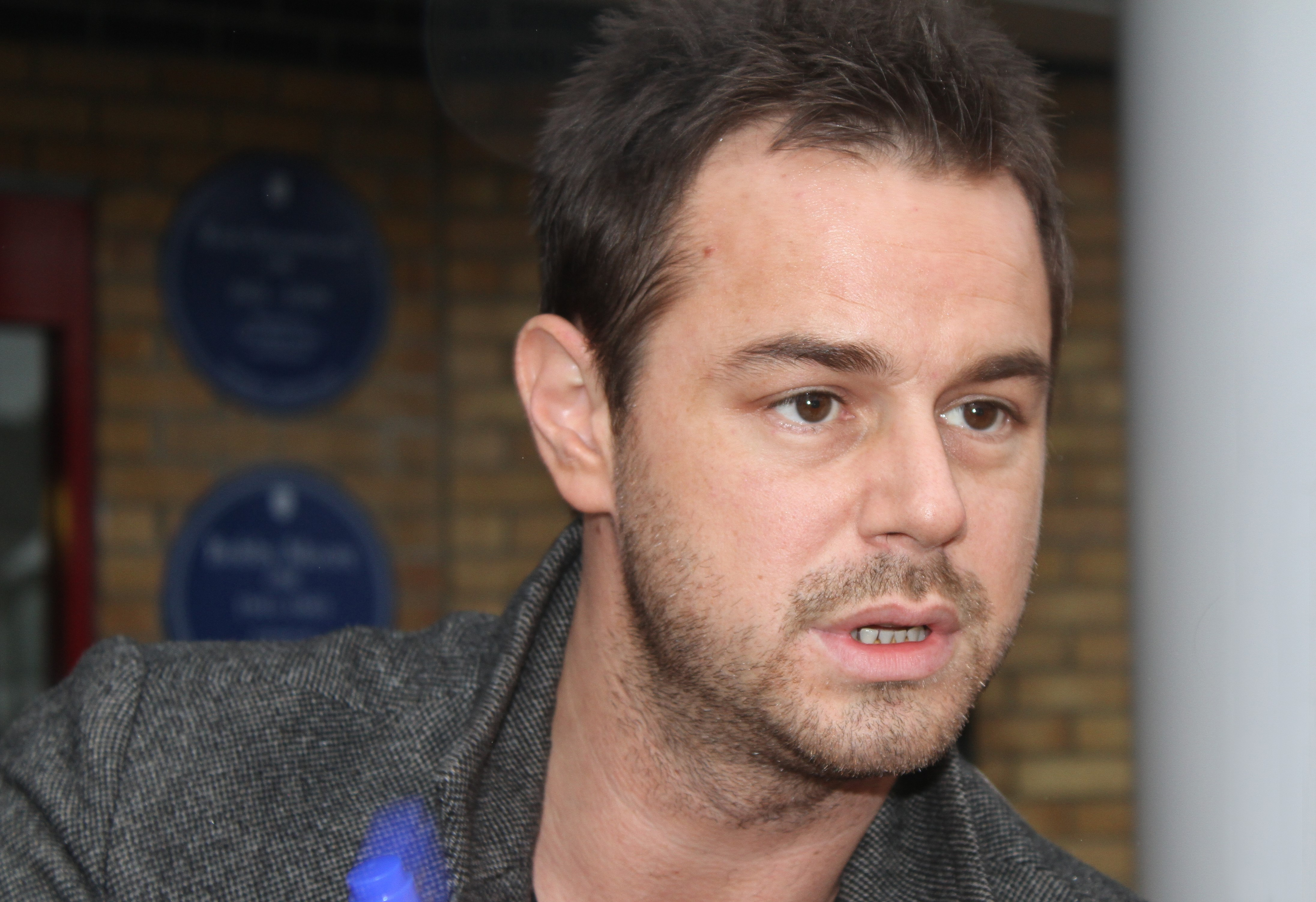
Danny Dyer (Mick Carter) won the award for Best Actor at the Inside Soap Awards in 2014.

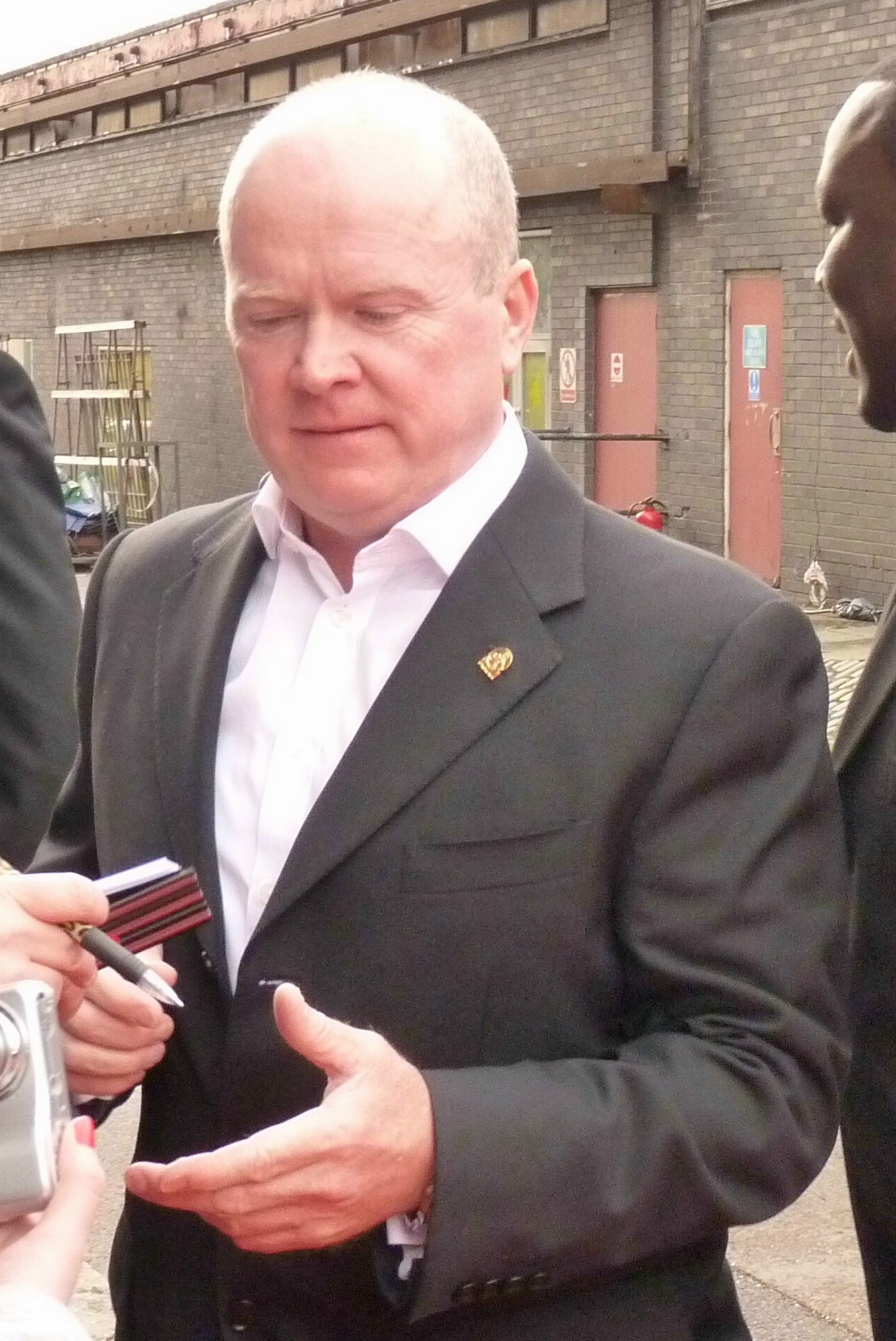
Steve McFadden (Phil Mitchell) won the award for Best Actor at the Inside Soap Awards in 2016.

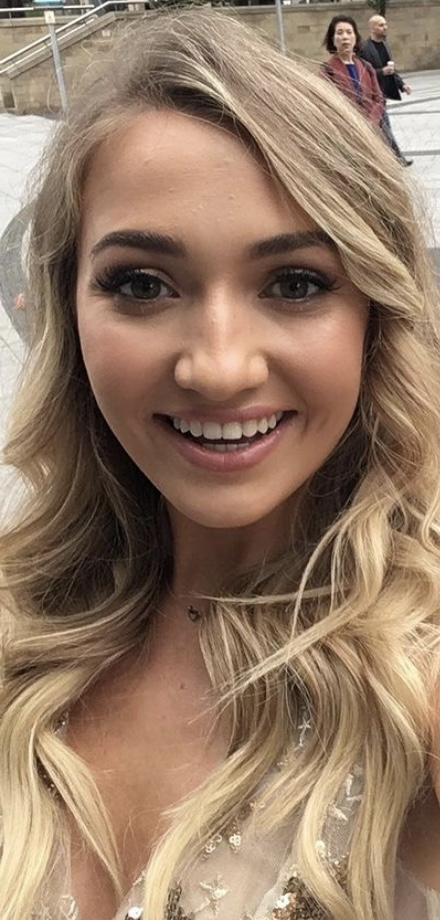
Tilly Keeper (Louise Mitchell) was nominated for the award for Best Newcomer at the Inside Soap Awards in 2016.

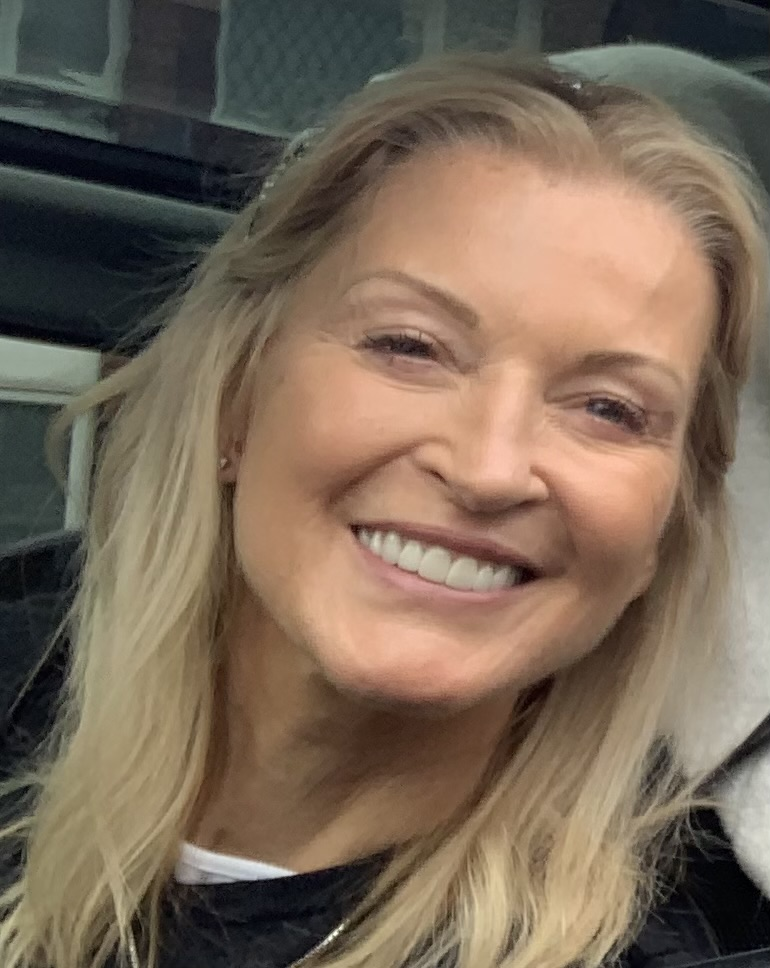
Gillian Taylforth (Kathy Beale) was awarded Outstanding Achievement in 2017.

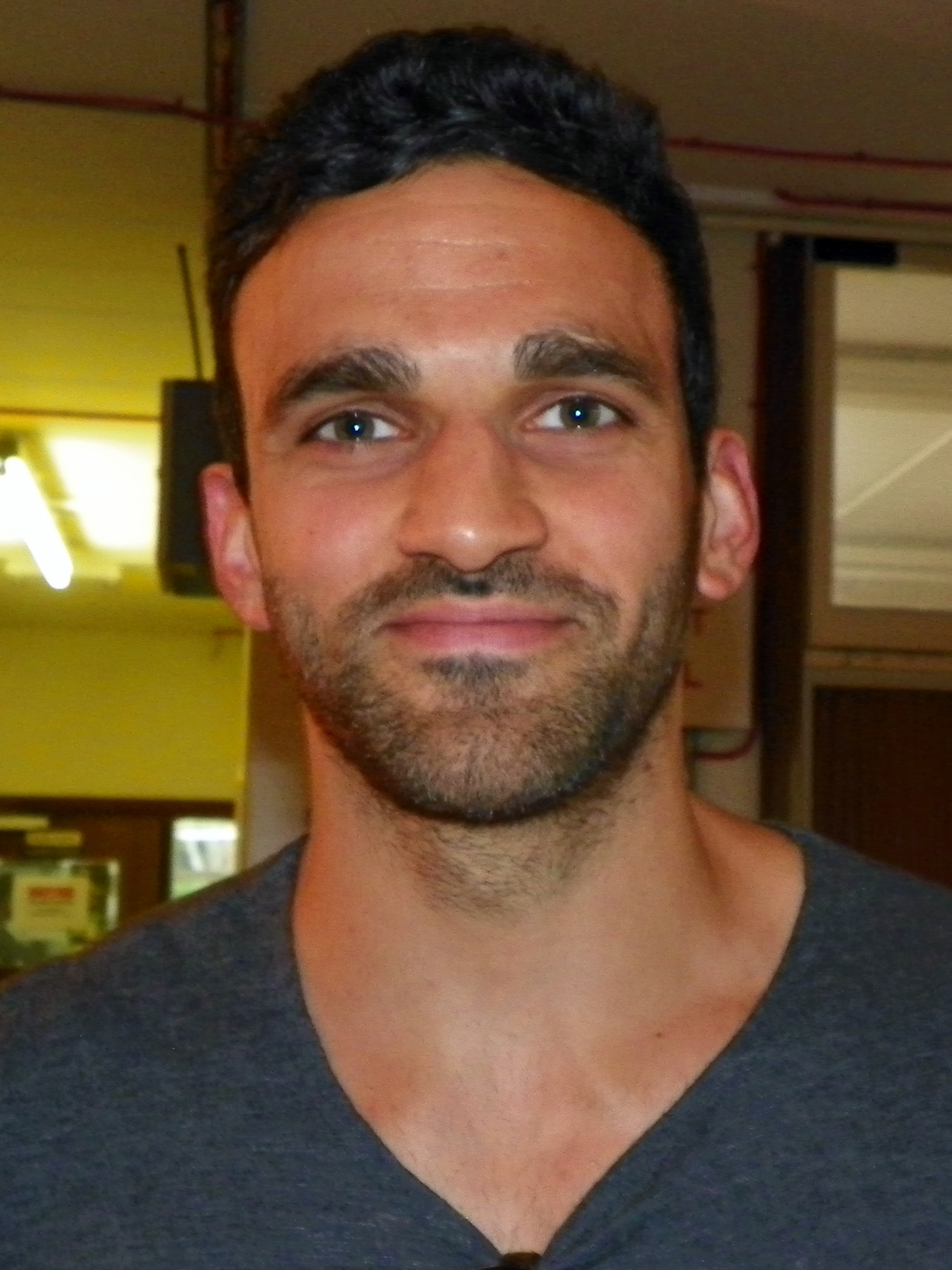
Davood Ghadami (Kush Kazemi) was awarded Sexiest Male in 2017.

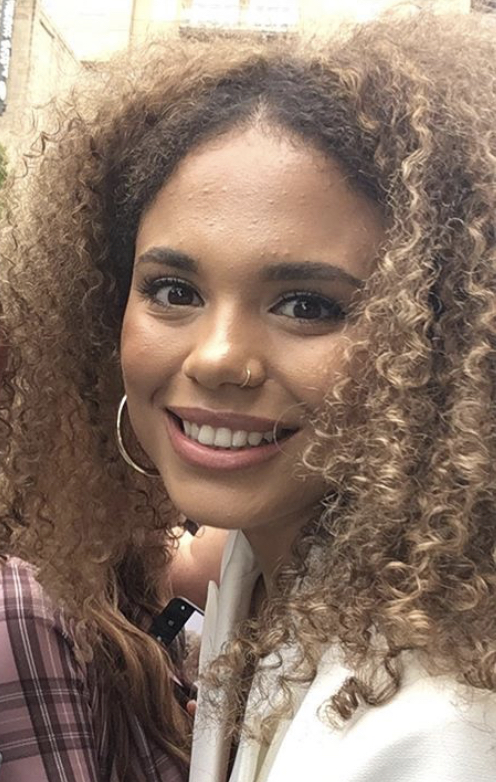
Jessica Plummer (Chantelle Atkins) won the award for Best Actress at the Inside Soap Awards in 2020.

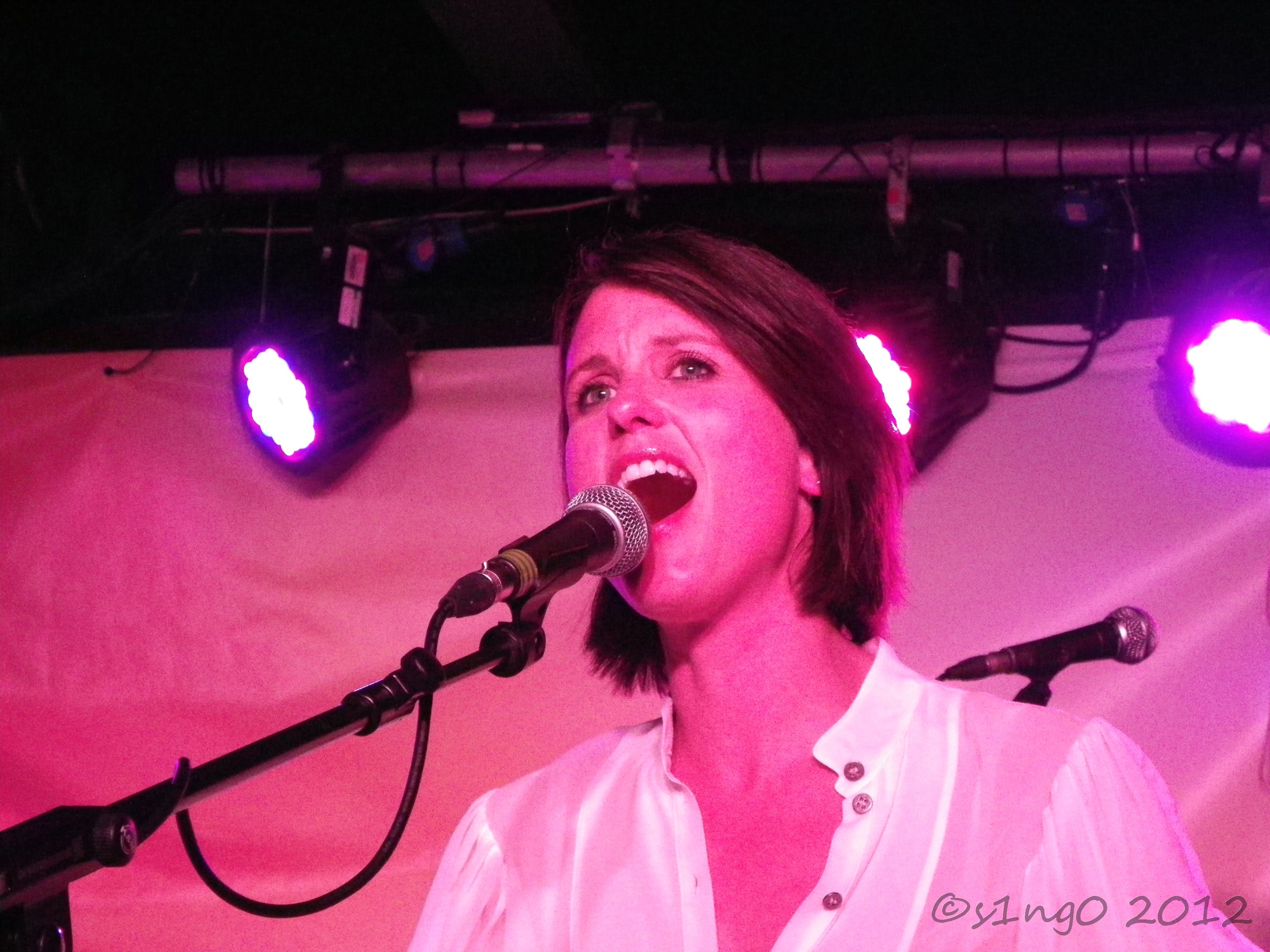
Heather Peace (Eve Unwin) was awarded Best Newcomer in 2022.

Year	Category	Nominee(s)	Result	Ref(s)
1993	Best Actor in Soap	Ross Kemp (Grant Mitchell)	Nominated	
1993	Best British Soap	EastEnders	Nominated	
1993	Soap's Biggest Bad Guy	Nick Cotton (John Altman)	Nominated	
1993	Soap's Biggest Bitch	Mandy Salter (Nicola Stapleton)	Won	
1997	Best British Soap	EastEnders	Won	
1998	Best British Soap	EastEnders	Won	
1999	Best British Soap	EastEnders	Won	
2000	Best British Soap	EastEnders	Won	
2001	Best Actor	Martin Kemp (Steve Owen)	Won	
2001	Best Actor	Steve McFadden (Phil Mitchell)	Nominated	
2001	Best Actress	June Brown (Dot Branning)	Won	
2001	Best Actress	Natalie Cassidy (Sonia Fowler)	Nominated	
2001	Best British Soap	EastEnders	Won	
2001	Best Couple	Lucy Speed and Shaun Williamson (Natalie and Barry Evans)	Nominated	
2001	Best Couple	Tamzin Outhwaite and Martin Kemp (Mel and Steve Owen)	Nominated	
2001	Best Bad Boy	Phil Mitchell (Steve McFadden)	Nominated	
2001	Best Bitch	Janine Butcher (Charlie Brooks)	Nominated	
2001	Best Newcomer	Jessie Wallace (Kat Slater)	Nominated	
2001	Best Exit	Frank Butcher (Mike Reid)	Nominated	
2001	Best Exit	Ashley Cotton (Frankie Fitzgerald)	Nominated	
2001	Best Exit	Ethel Skinner (Gretchen Franklin)	Nominated	
2001	Best Young Actor	Michelle Ryan (Zoe Slater)	Nominated	
2001	Funniest Character	Billy Mitchell (Perry Fenwick)	Nominated	
2001	Lifetime Achievement	Barbara Windsor (Peggy Mitchell)	Won	
2001	Most Dramatic Storyline	Dot Cotton helps Ethel Skinner to die)	Nominated	
2001	Most Dramatic Storyline	Who Shot Phil?	Won	
2002	Best Actor	Alex Ferns (Trevor Morgan)	Won	
2002	Best Actress	Kacey Ainsworth (Little Mo Mitchell)	Won	
2002	Best British Soap	EastEnders	Won	
2002	Best Storyline	Zoe Slater discovering Kat Slater is her real mother	Won	
2003	Best Actor	Steve McFadden (Phil Mitchell)	Won	
2003	Best British Soap	EastEnders	Won	
2003	Best Family	Moon family	Won	
2003	Best Newcomer	Shane Richie (Alfie Moon)	Won	
2003	Outstanding Achievement	June Brown (Dot Branning)	Won	
2004	Best Actor	Nigel Harman (Dennis Rickman)	Won	
2004	Best Actress	June Brown (Dot Branning)	Won	
2004	Best British Soap	EastEnders	Won	
2004	Best Couple	Shane Richie and Jessie Wallace (Alfie Moon and Kat Slater)	Won	
2005	Best Actor	Nigel Harman (Dennis Rickman)	Won	
2005	Best Actor	Shane Richie (Alfie Moon)	Nominated	
2005	Best Actress	June Brown (Dot Branning)	Nominated	
2005	Best Actress	Tracy-Ann Oberman (Chrissie Watts)	Nominated	
2005	Best Bitch	Tracy-Ann Oberman (Chrissie Watts)	Nominated	
2005	Best British Soap	EastEnders	Won	
2005	Best Couple	John Bardon and June Brown (Jim and Dot Branning)	Won	
2005	Best Couple	Letitia Dean and Nigel Harman (Sharon Rickman and Dennis Rickman)	Nominated	
2005	Best Family	Miller family	Nominated	
2005	Best Family	Slater family	Nominated	
2005	Best Storyline	The Murder of Den Watts	Won	
2005	Best Newcomer	Joel Beckett (Jake Moon)	Nominated	
2005	Best Newcomer	Lacey Turner (Stacey Slater)	Nominated	
2005	Best Young Actor	Lacey Turner (Stacey Slater)	Nominated	
2005	Funniest Star	John Bardon (Jim Branning)	Nominated	
2005	Outstanding Achievement	Letitia Dean (Sharon Rickman)	Won	
2006	Best Actor	Steve McFadden (Phil Mitchell)	Nominated	
2006	Best Actress	Lacey Turner (Stacey Slater)	Won	
2006	Best British Soap	EastEnders	Won	
2006	Best Family	Mitchell family	Won	
2006	Best Newcomer	Charlie Clements (Bradley Branning)	Won	
2007	Best Actress	Lacey Turner (Stacey Slater)	Won	
2007	Best Bitch	Sophie Thompson (Stella Crawford)	Won	
2007	Best British Soap	EastEnders	Nominated	
2007	Best Couple	Lacey Turner and Charlie Clements (Stacey Slater and Bradley Branning)	Won	
2007	Best Storyline	Stella Crawford's torment of Ben Mitchell	Won	
2008	Best Actor	Robert Kazinsky (Sean Slater)	Won	
2008	Best Actor	Jake Wood (Max Branning)	Nominated	
2008	Best Actress	Lacey Turner (Stacey Slater)	Won	
2008	Best British Soap	EastEnders	Won	
2008	Best Couple	Lacey Turner and Charlie Clements (Stacey Slater and Bradley Branning)	Won	
2008	Best Newcomer	Rita Simons (Roxy Mitchell)	Won	
2008	Best Storyline	Revelation of Max and Stacey Branning's affair, Christmas 2007	Won	
2008	Funniest Performance	Cheryl Fergison (Heather Trott)	Won	
2009	Best Actor	Scott Maslen (Jack Branning)	Shortlisted	
2009	Best Actor	Steve McFadden (Phil Mitchell)	Longlisted	
2009	Best Actor	Jake Wood (Max Branning)	Longlisted	
2009	Best Actress	Patsy Palmer (Bianca Jackson)	Shortlisted	
2009	Best Actress	Lacey Turner (Stacey Slater)	Won	
2009	Best Actress	Barbara Windsor (Peggy Mitchell)	Longlisted	
2009	Best Bad Boy	John Altman (Nick Cotton)	Longlisted	
2009	Best Bad Boy	Larry Lamb (Archie Mitchell)	Won	
2009	Best Bitch	Charlie Brooks (Janine Butcher)	Won	
2009	Best Bitch	Linda Henry (Shirley Carter)	Longlisted	
2009	Best Family	Masood family	Shortlisted	
2009	Best Family	Mitchell family	Shortlisted	
2009	Best Newcomer	Lauren Crace (Danielle Jones)	Shortlisted	
2009	Best Newcomer	Marc Elliott (Syed Masood)	Longlisted	
2009	Best Soap	EastEnders	Won	
2009	Best Storyline	Bianca Jackson discovering Tony King's abuse over Whitney Dean	Longlisted	
2009	Best Storyline	Ronnie Mitchell and Danielle Jones's unravelling relationship	Won	
2009	Best Storyline	Roxy Mitchell and Sean Slater baby quadrangle	Shortlisted	
2009	Best Young Actor	Jamie Borthwick (Jay Brown)	Longlisted	
2009	Best Young Actor	Shona McGarty (Whitney Dean)	Shortlisted	
2009	Funniest Performance	Cheryl Fergison (Heather Trott)	Shortlisted	
2009	Funniest Performance	Nina Wadia (Zainab Masood)	Shortlisted	
2010	Best Actor	Nitin Ganatra (Masood Ahmed)	Longlisted	
2010	Best Actor	Don Gilet (Lucas Johnson)	Shortlisted	
2010	Best Actor	Scott Maslen (Jack Branning)	Shortlisted	
2010	Best Actress	Diane Parish (Denise Johnson)	Shortlisted	
2010	Best Actress	Lacey Turner (Stacey Slater)	Won	
2010	Best Actress	Nina Wadia (Zainab Masood)	Longlisted	
2010	Best Dramatic Performance	Don Gilet (Lucas Johnson)	Shortlisted	
2010	Best Dramatic Performance	Lacey Turner (Stacey Slater)	Shortlisted	
2010	Best Exit	Charlie Clements (Bradley Branning)	Won	
2010	Best Exit	Larry Lamb (Archie Mitchell)	Longlisted	
2010	Best Newcomer	Zöe Lucker (Vanessa Gold)	Longlisted	
2010	Best Newcomer	Ricky Norwood (Fatboy)	Won	
2010	Best Soap	EastEnders	Won	
2010	Best Stunt	Bradley Branning's death	Shortlisted	
2010	Best Young Actor	Lorna Fitzgerald (Abi Branning)	Shortlisted	
2010	Best Young Actor	Maisie Smith (Tiffany Dean)	Shortlisted	
2010	Best Wedding	Ricky Butcher and Bianca Jackson (Sid Owen and Patsy Palmer)	Shortlisted	
2010	Best Wedding	Syed Masood and Amira Shah (Marc Elliott and Preeya Kalidas)	Won	
2010	Funniest Performance	Himesh Patel (Tamwar Masood)	Longlisted	
2010	Funniest Performance	Nina Wadia (Zainab Masood)	Shortlisted	
2011	Best Actor	Nitin Ganatra (Masood Ahmed)	Longlisted	
2011	Best Actor	Scott Maslen (Jack Branning)	Shortlisted	
2011	Best Actor	Steve McFadden (Phil Mitchell)	Longlisted	
2011	Best Actress	Lindsey Coulson (Carol Jackson)	Longlisted	
2011	Best Actress	Nina Wadia (Zainab Masood)	Longlisted	
2011	Best Actress	Jessie Wallace (Kat Moon)	Won	
2011	Best Dramatic Performance	Lindsey Coulson (Carol Jackson)	Longlisted	
2011	Best Dramatic Performance	Steve McFadden (Phil Mitchell)	Shortlisted	
2011	Best Exit	Lacey Turner (Stacey Branning)	Shortlisted	
2011	Best Exit	Barbara Windsor (Peggy Mitchell)	Longlisted	
2011	Best Newcomer	Ace Bhatti (Yusef Khan)	Longlisted	
2011	Best Newcomer	Steve John Shepherd (Michael Moon)	Shortlisted	
2011	Best Soap	EastEnders	Won	
2011	Best Young Actor	James Forde (Liam Butcher)	Longlisted	
2011	Best Young Actor	Maisie Smith (Tiffany Dean)	Won	
2011	Best Wedding	Tanya Branning and Greg Jessop (Jo Joyner and Stefan Booth)	Longlisted	
2011	Best Wedding	Tamwar Masood and Afia Khan (Himesh Pateland Meryl Fernandes)	Won	
2011	Funniest Performance	Tameka Empson (Kim Fox)	Won	
2011	Funniest Performance	Gillian Wright (Jean Slater)	Shortlisted	
2012	Best Actor	Steve McFadden (Phil Mitchell)	Longlisted	
2012	Best Actor	Shane Richie (Alfie Moon)	Shortlisted	
2012	Best Actor	Jake Wood (Max Branning)	Longlisted	
2012	Best Actress	Linda Henry (Shirley Carter)	Shortlisted	
2012	Best Actress	Jessie Wallace (Kat Moon)	Longlisted	
2012	Best Actress	Gillian Wright (Jean Slater)	Won	
2012	Best Bad Boy	Jamie Foreman (Derek Branning)	Shortlisted	
2012	Best Bad Boy	Steve McFadden (Phil Mitchell)	Longlisted	
2012	Best Bitch	Charlie Brooks (Janine Butcher)	Won	
2012	Best Bitch	Hetti Bywater (Lucy Beale)	Longlisted	
2012	Best Newcomer	Hetti Bywater (Lucy Beale)	Won	
2012	Best Newcomer	Chucky Venn (Ray Dixon)	Longlisted	
2012	Best Soap	EastEnders	Won	
2012	Best Young Actor	Lily Harvey (Shenice Quinn)	Longlisted	
2012	Best Young Actor	Maisie Smith (Tiffany Butcher)	Shortlisted	
2012	Funniest Female	Tameka Empson (Kim Fox)	Won	
2012	Funniest Female	Ann Mitchell (Cora Cross)	Longlisted	
2012	Funniest Male	Ricky Norwood (Fatboy)	Won	
2012	Funniest Male	Shane Richie (Alfie Moon)	Longlisted	
2013	Best Actor	Nitin Ganatra (Masood Ahmed)	Longlisted	
2013	Best Actor	Steve McFadden (Phil Mitchell)	Longlisted	
2013	Best Actor	Jake Wood (Max Branning)	Shortlisted	
2013	Best Actress	Danielle Harold (Lola Pearce)	Longlisted	
2013	Best Actress	Jacqueline Jossa (Lauren Branning)	Won	
2013	Best Actress	Nina Wadia (Zainab Masood)	Longlisted	
2013	Best Bad Boy	Daniel Coonan (Carl White)	Longlisted	
2013	Best Bad Boy	Steve John Shepherd (Michael Moon)	Shortlisted	
2013	Best Bitch	Charlie Brooks (Janine Butcher)	Shortlisted	
2013	Best Bitch	Hetti Bywater (Lucy Beale)	Longlisted	
2013	Best Newcomer	Khali Best (Dexter Hartman)	Won	
2013	Best Newcomer	Ben Hardy (Peter Beale)	Shortlisted	
2013	Best Soap	EastEnders	Nominated	
2013	Best Storyline	Lauren Branning's struggle with alcohol	Shortlisted	
2013	Best Storyline	Lola Pearce's custody battle with Phil Mitchell	Longlisted	
2013	Best Young Actor	Maisie Smith (Tiffany Butcher)	Won	
2013	Best Young Actor	Rory Stroud (Bobby Beale)	Longlisted	
2013	Funniest Female	Tameka Empson (Kim Fox)	Won	
2013	Funniest Female	Linda Henry (Shirley Carter)	Longlisted	
2013	Funniest Male	Ricky Norwood (Fatboy)	Shortlisted	
2013	Funniest Male	Phaldut Sharma (AJ Ahmed)	Longlisted	
2014	Best Actor	Danny Dyer (Mick Carter)	Won	
2014	Best Actor	Rudolph Walker (Patrick Trueman)	Longlisted	
2014	Best Actor	Adam Woodyatt (Ian Beale)	Longlisted	
2014	Best Actress	Lindsey Coulson (Carol Jackson)	Shortlisted	
2014	Best Actress	Letitia Dean (Sharon Rickman)	Longlisted	
2014	Best Actress	Jessie Wallace (Kat Moon)	Longlisted	
2014	Best Bad Boy	Matt Di Angelo (Dean Wicks)	Shortlisted	
2014	Best Bad Boy	Kristian Kiehling (Aleks Shirovs)	Longlisted	
2014	Best Bitch	Tanya Franks (Rainie Cross)	Longlisted	
2014	Best Bitch	Lisa Hammond (Donna Yates)	Longlisted	
2014	Best Family	The Beales	Longlisted	
2014	Best Family	The Carters	Won	
2014	Best Newcomer	Maddy Hill (Nancy Carter)	Shortlisted	
2014	Best Newcomer	Sam Strike (Johnny Carter)	Shortlisted	
2014	Best Soap	EastEnders	Won	
2014	Best Storyline	Linda Carter's journey to accepting Johnny Carter's sexuality	Longlisted	
2014	Best Storyline	Who Killed Lucy Beale?	Shortlisted	
2014	Best Young Actor	Mimi Keene (Cindy Williams)	Shortlisted	
2014	Best Young Actor	George Sergeant (TJ Spraggan)	Longlisted	
2014	Funniest Female	Luisa Bradshaw-White (Tina Carter)	Longlisted	
2014	Funniest Female	Tameka Empson (Kim Fox)	Shortlisted	
2014	Funniest Male	Himesh Patel (Tamwar Masood)	Longlisted	
2014	Funniest Male	Shane Richie (Alfie Moon)	Shortlisted	
2015	Best Actor	Matt Di Angelo (Dean Wicks)	Longlisted	
2015	Best Actor	Danny Dyer (Mick Carter)	Shortlisted	
2015	Best Actor	Adam Woodyatt (Ian Beale)	Shortlisted	
2015	Best Actress	Laurie Brett (Jane Beale)	Longlisted	
2015	Best Actress	Kellie Bright (Linda Carter)	Shortlisted	
2015	Best Actress	Rakhee Thakrar (Shabnam Masood)	Longlisted	
2015	Best Affair	Stacey Branning and Kush Kazemi (Lacey Turner and Davood Ghadami)	Shortlisted	
2015	Best Affair	Paul Coker and Ben Mitchell (Jonny Labey and Harry Reid)	Longlisted	
2015	Best Bad Boy	Eliot Carrington (Bobby Beale)	Longlisted	
2015	Best Bad Boy	Matt Di Angelo (Dean Wicks)	Shortlisted	
2015	Best Bad Girl	Annette Badland (Babe Smith)	Longlisted	
2015	Best Bad Girl	Lorna Fitzgerald (Abi Branning)	Longlisted	
2015	Best Newcomer	Richard Blackwood (Vincent Hubbard)	Shortlisted	
2015	Best Newcomer	Bonnie Langford (Carmel Kazemi)	Longlisted	
2015	Best Partnership	Laurie Brett and Adam Woodyatt (Jane and Ian Beale)	Longlisted	
2015	Best Partnership	Maddy Hill and Himesh Patel (Nancy Carter and Tamwar Masood)	Shortlisted	
2015	Best Show-Stopper	Ronnie Mitchell's wedding-day car crash	Longlisted	
2015	Best Show-Stopper	The live episode	Won	
2015	Best Shock Twist	Bobby killed Lucy	Won	
2015	Best Shock Twist	Kathy Beale is alive	Shortlisted	
2015	Best Soap	EastEnders	Nominated	
2015	Best Young Actor	Eliot Carrington (Bobby Beale)	Longlisted	
2015	Best Young Actor	Mimi Keene (Cindy Williams)	Shortlisted	
2015	Funniest Female	Luisa Bradshaw-White (Tina Carter)	Longlisted	
2015	Funniest Female	Tameka Empson (Kim Fox-Hubbard)	Won	
2015	Funniest Male	Ricky Norwood (Fatboy)	Longlisted	
2015	Funniest Male	Himesh Patel (Tamwar Masood)	Shortlisted	
2016	Best Actor	James Bye (Martin Fowler)	Longlisted	
2016	Best Actor	Danny Dyer (Mick Carter)	Shortlisted	
2016	Best Actor	Steve McFadden (Phil Mitchell)	Won	
2016	Best Actress	Kellie Bright (Linda Carter)	Longlisted	
2016	Best Actress	Letitia Dean (Sharon Mitchell)	Longlisted	
2016	Best Actress	Lacey Turner (Stacey Fowler)	Won	
2016	Best Bad Boy	Eliot Carrington (Bobby Beale)	Shortlisted	
2016	Best Bad Boy	Jack Derges (Andy Flynn)	Longlisted	
2016	Best Bad Girl	Annette Badland (Babe Smith)	Shortlisted	
2016	Best Bad Girl	Ellen Thomas (Claudette Hubbard)	Longlisted	
2016	Best Exit	Maddy Hill and Himesh Patel (Nancy Carter and Tamwar Masood)	Longlisted	
2016	Best Exit	Barbara Windsor (Peggy Mitchell)	Won	
2016	Best Newcomer	Shaheen Jafargholi (Shakil Kazemi)	Longlisted	
2016	Best Newcomer	Tilly Keeper (Louise Mitchell)	Longlisted	
2016	Best Partnership	James Bye and Lacey Turner (Martin and Stacey Fowler)	Shortlisted	
2016	Best Partnership	Harry Reid and Jonny Labey (Ben Mitchell]] and Paul Coker)	Longlisted	
2016	Best Show-Stopper	Peggy Mitchell's death	Longlisted	
2016	Best Show-Stopper	Stacey Branning being sectioned	Shortlisted	
2016	Best Shock Twist	Bobby Beale attacks Jane Beale and confesses all	Shortlisted	
2016	Best Shock Twist	Pam Coker meets "Christine"	Longlisted	
2016	Best Soap	EastEnders	Nominated	
2016	Best Young Actor	Abbie Knowles (Amy Mitchell)	Longlisted	
2016	Best Young Actor	Bleu Landau (Dennis Rickman Jnr)	Longlisted	
2016	Funniest Female	Tameka Empson (Kim Fox-Hubbard)	Won	
2016	Funniest Female	Carli Norris (Belinda Peacock)	Longlisted	
2016	Funniest Male	Danny Dyer (Mick Carter)	Shortlisted	
2016	Funniest Male	Nitin Ganatra (Masood Ahmed)	Longlisted	
2017	Best Actor	Danny Dyer (Mick Carter)	Shortlisted	
2017	Best Actor	Scott Maslen (Jack Branning)	Longlisted	
2017	Best Actor	Jake Wood (Max Branning)	Longlisted	
2017	Best Actress	Shona McGarty (Whitney Carter)	Longlisted	
2017	Best Actress	Diane Parish (Denise Fox)	Longlisted	
2017	Best Actress	Lacey Turner (Stacey Fowler)	Longlisted	
2017	Best Bad Boy	Aaron Sidwell (Steven Beale)	Longlisted	
2017	Best Bad Boy	Jake Wood (Max Branning)	Shortlisted	
2017	Best Bad Girl	Lisa Faulkner (Fi Browning)	Longlisted	
2017	Best Bad Girl	Lorna Fitzgerald (Abi Branning)	Shortlisted	
2017	Best Exit	Danny-Boy Hatchard (Lee Carter)	Longlisted	
2017	Best Exit	Samantha Womack and Rita Simons (Ronnie and Roxy Mitchell)	Shortlisted	
2017	Best Newcomer	Lee Ryan (Woody Woodward)	Shortlisted	
2017	Best Newcomer	Danny Walters (Keanu Taylor)	Longlisted	
2017	Best Partnership	Danny Dyer and Kellie Bright (Mick and Linda Carter)	Longlisted	
2017	Best Partnership	Lorna Fitzgerald and Aaron Sidwell (Abi Branning and Steven Beale)	Longlisted	
2017	Best Show-Stopper	Mickand Linda Carter's showdown	Longlisted	
2017	Best Show-Stopper	Ronnie and Roxy Mitchell's deaths	Shortlisted	
2017	Best Shock Twist	Max Branning and Fi Browning are in cahoots	Longlisted	
2017	Best Shock Twist	Steven Beale's desperate lie	Longlisted	
2017	Best Soap	EastEnders	Nominated	
2017	Best Young Actor	Henri Charles (Ricky Mitchell)	Longlisted	
2017	Best Young Actor	Bleu Landau (Dennis Rickman Jnr)	Longlisted	
2017	Funniest Female	Tameka Empson (Kim Fox-Hubbard)	Shortlisted	
2017	Funniest Female	Lisa Hammond (Donna Yates)	Longlisted	
2017	Funniest Male	Richard Blackwood (Vincent Hubbard)	Longlisted	
2017	Funniest Male	Danny Dyer (Mick Carter)	Longlisted	
2017	Outstanding Achievement	Gillian Taylforth (Kathy Beale)	Won	
2017	Sexiest Female	Jacqueline Jossa (Lauren Branning)	Shortlisted	
2017	Sexiest Female	Shona McGarty (Whitney Carter)	Longlisted	
2017	Sexiest Male	Davood Ghadami (Kush Kazemi)	Won	
2017	Sexiest Male	Danny Walters (Keanu Taylor)	Longlisted	
2018	Best Actor	Danny Dyer (Mick Carter)	Shortlisted	
2018	Best Actor	Steve McFadden (Phil Mitchell)	Longlisted	
2018	Best Actor	Zack Morris (Keegan Baker)	Longlisted	
2018	Best Actress	Luisa Bradshaw-White (Tina Carter)	Longlisted	
2018	Best Actress	Letitia Dean (Sharon Mitchell)	Longlisted	
2018	Best Actress	Bonnie Langford (Carmel Kazemi)	Shortlisted	
2018	Best Bad Boy	Ricky Champ (Stuart Highway)	Shortlisted	
2018	Best Bad Boy	Charlie Winter (Hunter Owen)	Longlisted	
2018	Best Bad Girl	Tanya Franks (Rainie Branning)	Shortlisted	
2018	Best Bad Girl	Katie Jarvis (Hayley Slater)	Longlisted	
2018	Best Exit	Lorna Fitzgerald (Abi Branning)	Longlisted	
2018	Best Exit	Shaheen Jafargholi (Shakil Kazemi)	Shortlisted	
2018	Best Newcomer	Tony Clay (Halfway)	Shortlisted	
2018	Best Newcomer	Katie Jarvis (Hayley Slater)	Longlisted	
2018	Best Partnership	Danny Dyer and Kellie Bright (Mick and Linda Carter)	Won	
2018	Best Partnership	Jake Wood and Tanya Franks (Max and Rainie Branning)	Longlisted	
2018	Best Show-Stopper	Lauren Branning and Abi Branning's horror fall	Longlisted	
2018	Best Show-Stopper	Keegan Baker and Shakil Kazemi's attack	Won	
2018	Best Shock Twist	Alfie Moon is Hayley Slater's baby daddy	Longlisted	
2018	Best Shock Twist	Sharon Mitchell has the heist money	Longlisted	
2018	Best Soap	EastEnders	Nominated	
2018	Best Young Actor	Bleu Landau (Dennis Rickman Jnr)	Longlisted	
2018	Best Young Actor	Maisie Smith (Tiffany Butcher)	Shortlisted	
2018	Funniest Female	Tameka Empson (Kim Fox-Hubbard)	Shortlisted	
2018	Funniest Female	Lorraine Stanley (Karen Taylor)	Shortlisted	
2018	Funniest Male	Tony Clay (Halfway)	Longlisted	
2018	Funniest Male	Nitin Ganatra (Masood Ahmed)	Longlisted	
2019	Best Actor	Danny Dyer (Mick Carter)	Shortlisted	
2019	Best Actress	Gillian Wright (Jean Slater)	Shortlisted	
2019	Best Bad Boy	Max Bowden (Ben Mitchell)	Won	
2019	Best Bad Girl	Tanya Franks (Rainie Branning)	Shortlisted	
2019	Best Exit	Bonnie Langford (Carmel Kazemi)	Shortlisted	
2019	Best Newcomer	Jessica Plummer (Chantelle Atkins)	Shortlisted	
2019	Best Partnership	Danny Dyer and Kellie Bright (Mick and Linda Carter)	Shortlisted	
2019	Best Show-Stopper	Sean's story	Shortlisted	
2019	Best Shock Twist	Linda Carter double-crosses Stuart Highway	Shortlisted	
2019	Best Soap	EastEnders	Shortlisted	
2019	Best Young Actor	Kara-Leah Fernandes (Bailey Baker)	Won	
2019	Funniest Female	Lorraine Stanley (Karen Taylor)	Won	
2019	Funniest Male	Danny Dyer (Mick Carter)	Won	
2020	Best Actor	Max Bowden (Ben Mitchell)	Shortlisted	
2020	Best Actor	James Bye (Martin Fowler)	Longlisted	
2020	Best Actor	Zack Morris (Keegan Butcher-Baker)	Longlisted	
2020	Best Actress	Kellie Bright (Linda Carter)	Longlisted	
2020	Best Actress	Shona McGarty (Whitney Dean)	Longlisted	
2020	Best Actress	Jessica Plummer (Chantelle Atkins)	Won	
2020	Best Family	The Mitchells	Longlisted	
2020	Best Family	The Taylors	Shortlisted	
2020	Best Newcomer	Jaz Deol (Kheerat Panesar)	Shortlisted	
2020	Best Newcomer	Clay Milner Russell (Bobby Beale)	Longlisted	
2020	Best Newcomer	Milly Zero (Dotty Cotton)	Longlisted	
2020	Best Partnership	Max Bowden and Tony Clay (Ben Mitchell and Callum Highway)	Longlisted	
2020	Best Partnership	Danny Dyer and Kellie Bright (Mick and Linda Carter)	Won	
2020	Best Show-Stopper	Boat crash	Shortlisted	
2020	Best Show-Stopper	Linda Carter's drunken New Year	Longlisted	
2020	Best Soap	EastEnders	Won	
2020	Best Villain	Toby-Alexander Smith (Gray Atkins)	Shortlisted	
2020	Best Villain	Balvinder Sopal (Suki Panesar)	Longlisted	
2020	Best Villain	Tom Wells (Leo King)	Longlisted	
2020	Feel-Good Moment	Walford celebrates pride	Won	
2020	Feel-Good Moment	Tiffany and Keegan's wedding	Longlisted	
2020	Funniest Performance	Lorraine Stanley (Karen Taylor)	Won	
2020	Funniest Performance	Ricky Champ (Stuart Highway)	Longlisted	
2021	Best Actor	Stevie Basaula (Isaac Baptiste)	Longlisted	
2021	Best Actor	Jaz Deol (Kheerat Panesar)	Longlisted	
2021	Best Actor	Danny Dyer (Mick Carter)	Shortlisted	
2021	Best Actress	Balvinder Sopal (Suki Panesar)	Longlisted	
2021	Best Actress	Letitia Dean (Sharon Watts)	Longlisted	
2021	Best Actress	Shona McGarty (Whitney Dean)	Longlisted	
2021	Best Family	The Panesars	Longlisted	
2021	Best Family	The Slaters	Shortlisted	
2021	Best Newcomer	Zaraah Abrahams (Chelsea Fox)	Shortlisted	
2021	Best Newcomer	Brian Conley (Tom "Rocky" Cotton)	Longlisted	
2021	Best Newcomer	James Farrar (Zack Hudson)	Longlisted	
2021	Best Partnership	Jessie Wallace and Steve McFadden (Kat Slater and Phil Mitchell)	Longlisted	
2021	Best Partnership	Tanya Franks and Ricky Champ (Rainie and Stuart Highway)	Longlisted	
2021	Best Show-Stopper	Gray Atkins kills Kush Kazemi	Longlisted	
2021	Best Show-Stopper	Mick Carter faces his abuser Katy Lewis	Longlisted	
2021	Best Soap	EastEnders	Nominated	
2021	Best Villain	Simone Lahbib (Katy Lewis)	Longlisted	
2021	Best Villain	Toby-Alexander Smith (Gray Atkins)	Shortlisted	
2021	Best Villain	Balvinder Sopal (Suki Panesar)	Longlisted	
2021	Feel-Good Moment	Bobby Beale stops Dana Monroe from leaving	Longlisted	
2021	Feel-Good Moment	Ben Mitchell and Callum Highway's wedding	Shortlisted	
2021	Funniest Performance	Gwen Taylor (Vi Highway)	Longlisted	
2021	Funniest Performance	Tameka Empson (Kim Fox)	Shortlisted	
2022	All-Time Icon	Lacey Turner (Stacey Slater)	Won	
2022	Best Actor	Max Bowden (Ben Mitchell)	Shortlisted	
2022	Best Actor	Jaz Deol (Kheerat Panesar)	Longlisted	
2022	Best Actor	Danny Dyer (Mick Carter)	Longlisted	
2022	Best Actress	Zaraah Abrahams (Chelsea Fox)	Longlisted	
2022	Best Actress	Lacey Turner (Stacey Slater)	Longlisted	
2022	Best Actress	Gillian Wright (Jean Slater)	Won	
2022	Best Comic Performance	Brian Conley (Tom "Rocky" Cotton)	Longlisted	
2022	Best Comic Performance	Tameka Empson (Kim Fox)	Shortlisted	
2022	Best Double Act	James Bye and James Farrar (Martin Fowler and Zack Hudson)	Longlisted	
2022	Best Double Act	Gillian Wright and Lacey Turner (Jean and Stacey Slater)	Shortlisted	
2022	Best Family	The Panesars	Longlisted	
2022	Best Family	The Slaters	Shortlisted	
2022	Best Newcomer	Delroy Atkinson (Howie Danes)	Longlisted	
2022	Best Newcomer	Heather Peace (Eve Unwin)	Won	
2022	Best Romance	Lacey Turner and Jaz Deol (Stacey Slater and Kheerat Panesar)	Shortlisted	
2022	Best Romance	Jessie Wallace and Steve McFadden (Kat Slater and Phil Mitchell)	Longlisted	
2022	Best Showstopper	Jean in Southend	Won	
2022	Best Showstopper	Walford's Royal Jubilee visit	Longlisted	
2022	Best Soap	EastEnders	Won	
2022	Best Storyline	Ben's rape	Longlisted	
2022	Best Storyline	Jean's bipolar disorder	Shortlisted	
2022	Best Villain	Charlie Brooks (Janine Butcher)	Shortlisted	
2022	Best Villain	Toby-Alexander Smith (Gray Atkins)	Longlisted	
2022	Best Young Performer	Sonny Kendall (Tommy Moon)	Longlisted	
2022	Best Young Performer	Lillia Turner (Lily Slater)	Shortlisted	
2023	Best Actor	Jamie Borthwick (Jay Brown)	Won	
2023	Best Actor	James Farrar (Zack Hudson)	Longlisted	
2023	Best Actor	Perry Fenwick (Billy Mitchell)	Longlisted	
2023	Best Actress	Danielle Harold (Lola Pearce-Brown)	Won	
2023	Best Actress	Shona McGarty (Whitney Dean)	Longlisted	
2023	Best Actress	Diane Parish (Denise Fox)	Longlisted	
2023	Best Comic Performance	Bobby Brazier (Freddie Slater)	Longlisted	
2023	Best Comic Performance	Shane Richie (Alfie Moon)	Longlisted	
2023	Best Family	The Mitchells	Longlisted	
2023	Best Family	The Trueman-Fox-Brannings	Longlisted	
2023	Best Newcomer	Bobby Brazier (Freddie Slater)	Longlisted	
2023	Best Newcomer	Harriet Thorpe (Elaine Peacock)	Longlisted	
2023	Best Partnership	Emma Barton and Perry Fenwick (Honey and Billy Mitchell)	Longlisted	
2023	Best Partnership	Balvinder Sopal and Heather Peace (Suki Panesar and Eve Unwin)	Longlisted	
2023	Best Showstopper	Cindy Beale: Back from the dead	Longlisted	
2023	Best Showstopper	Mick jumps off a cliff to save Linda and Janine	Longlisted	
2023	Best Soap	EastEnders	Won	
2023	Best Storyline	Loving and losing Lola	Won	
2023	Best Storyline	Whitney and Zack say goodbye to Peach	Longlisted	
2023	Best Villain	William Ellis (Theo Hawthorne)	Longlisted	
2023	Best Villain	Aaron Thiara (Ravi Gulati)	Longlisted	
2023	Best Young Performer	Isabella Brown (Lexi Pearce)	Won	
2023	Best Young Performer	Lillia Turner (Lily Slater)	Longlisted	

== I Talk Telly Awards ==
The I Talk Telly awards were first awarded in 2015, where EastEnders won Best Soap. They won all three of the soap categories in 2016, with 32.9% of the vote for Best Soap. It has been hosted annually since and is voted for by readers of the entertainment website.

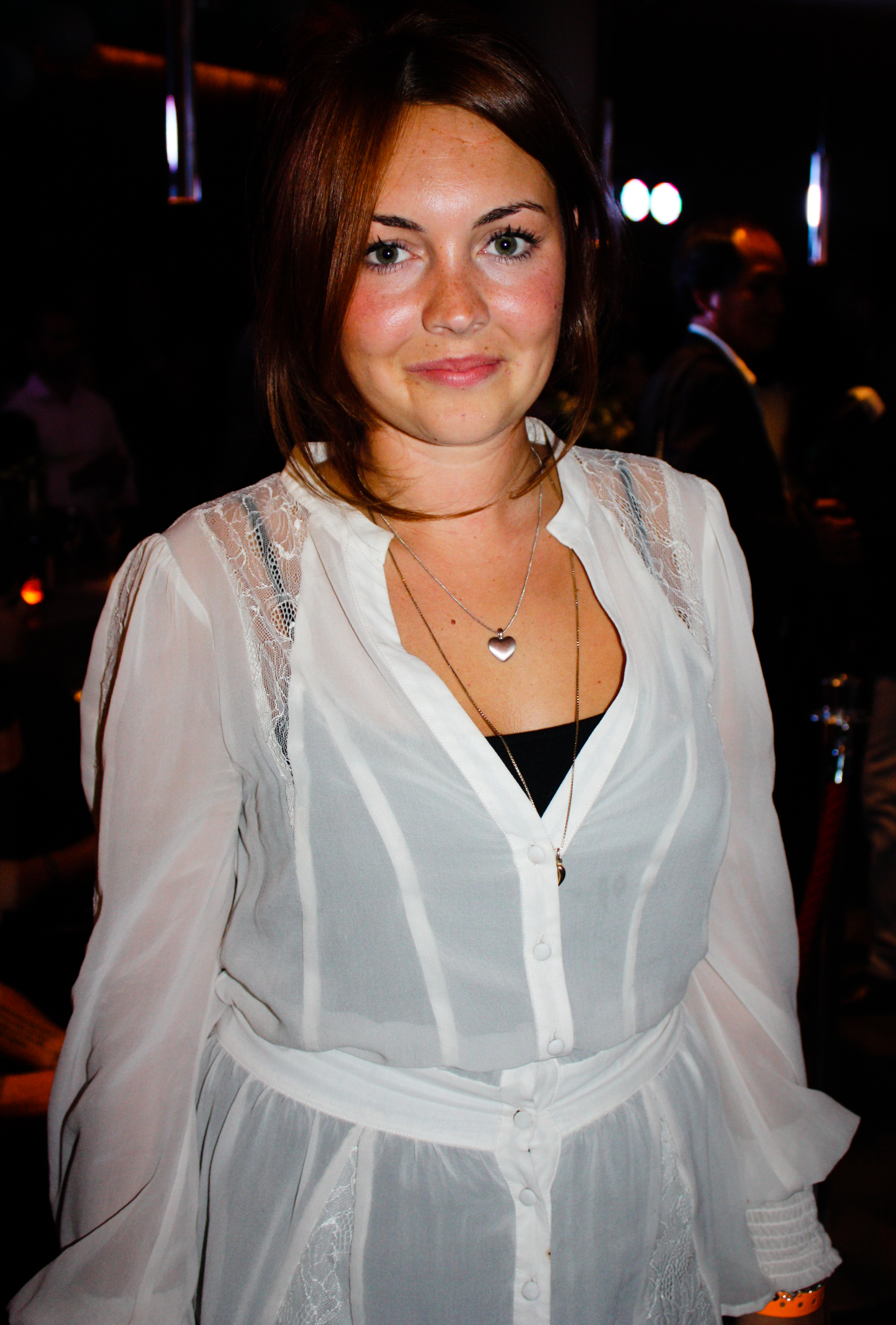
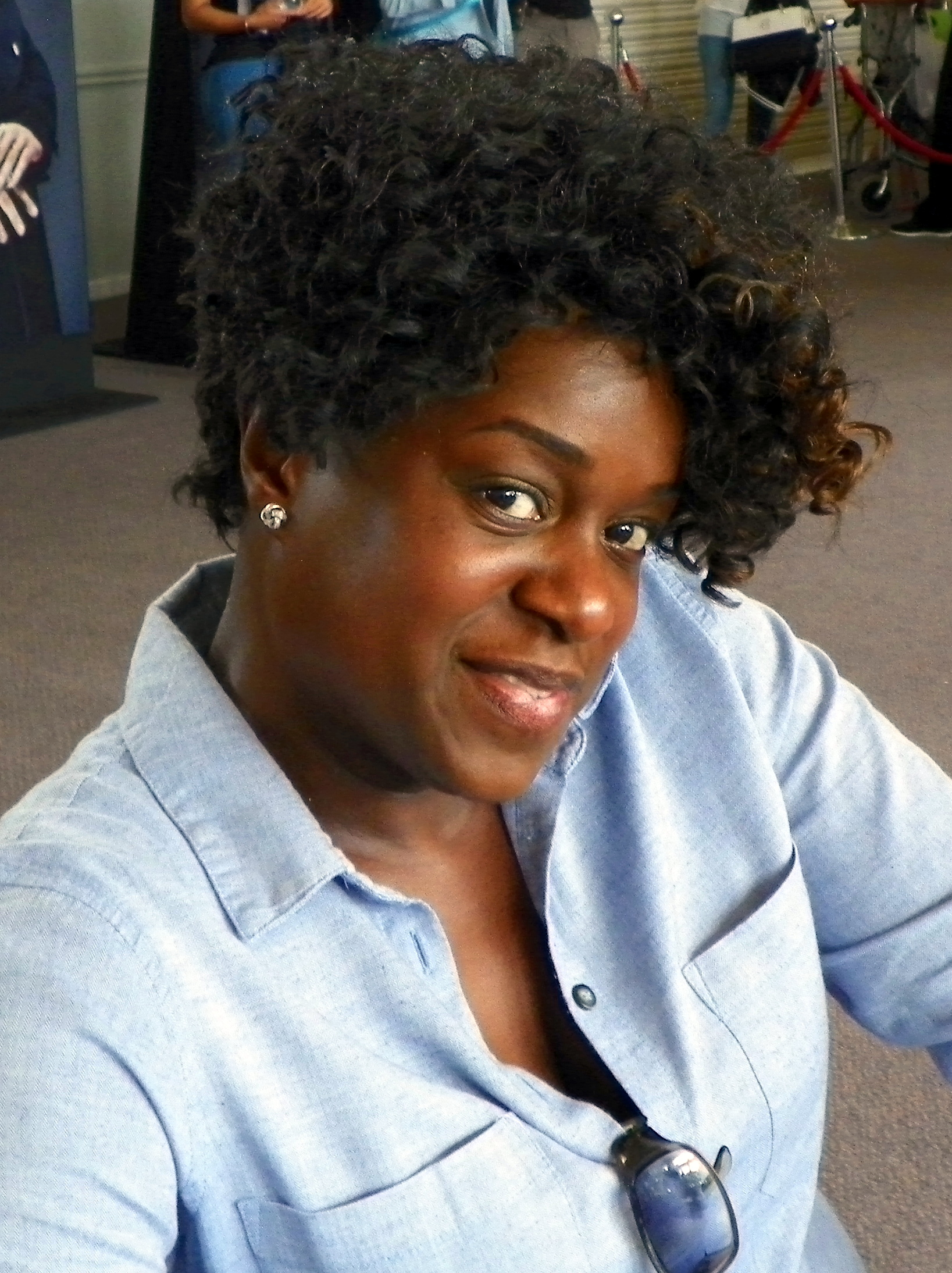
Lacey Turner (left) won Best Actress in a Soap in 2016 with 37.9% of the vote, while Tameka Empson (right) came in second with 18.9%.

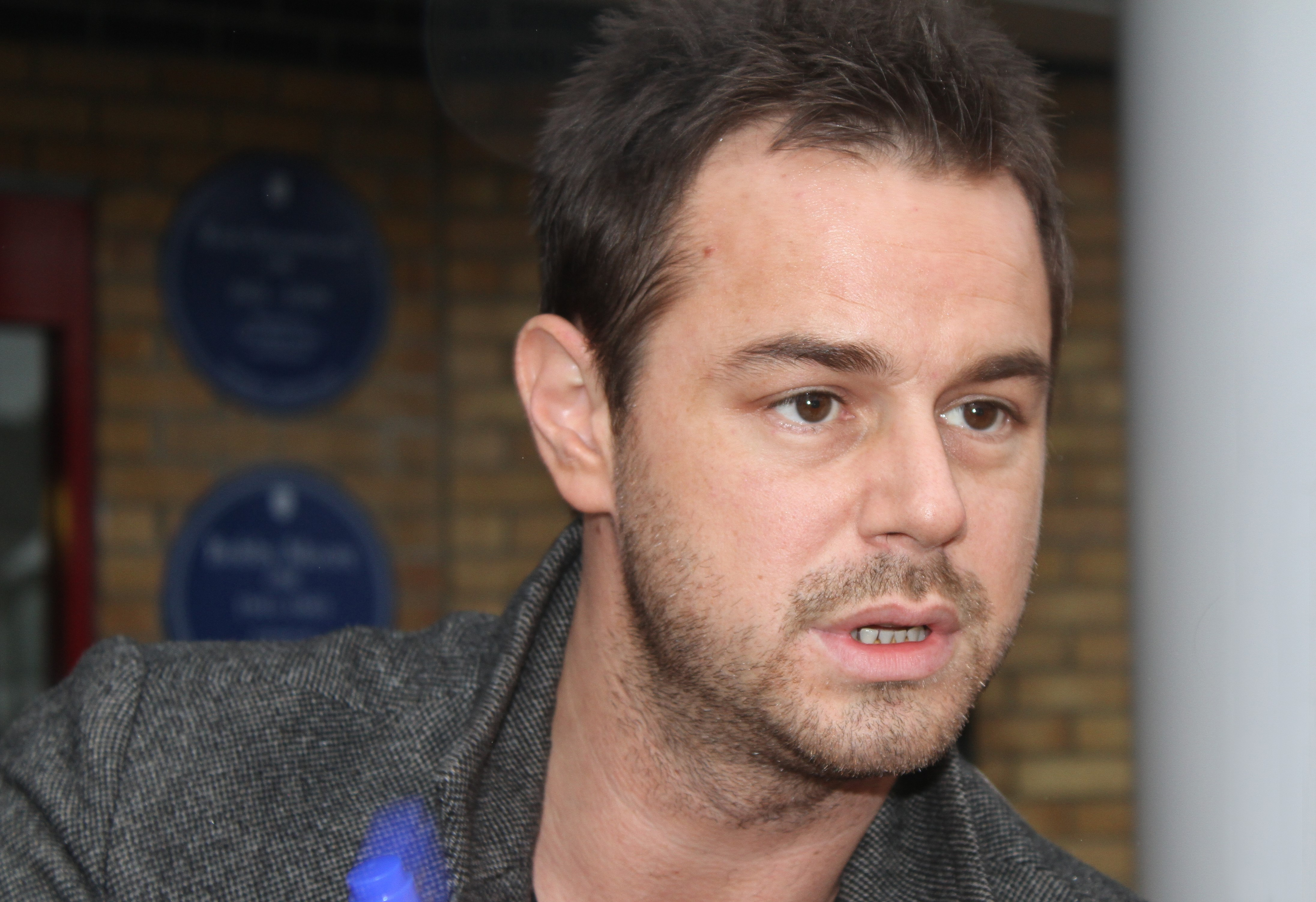
Danny Dyer won Best Actor in a Soap in 2016, with 27.9% of the vote.

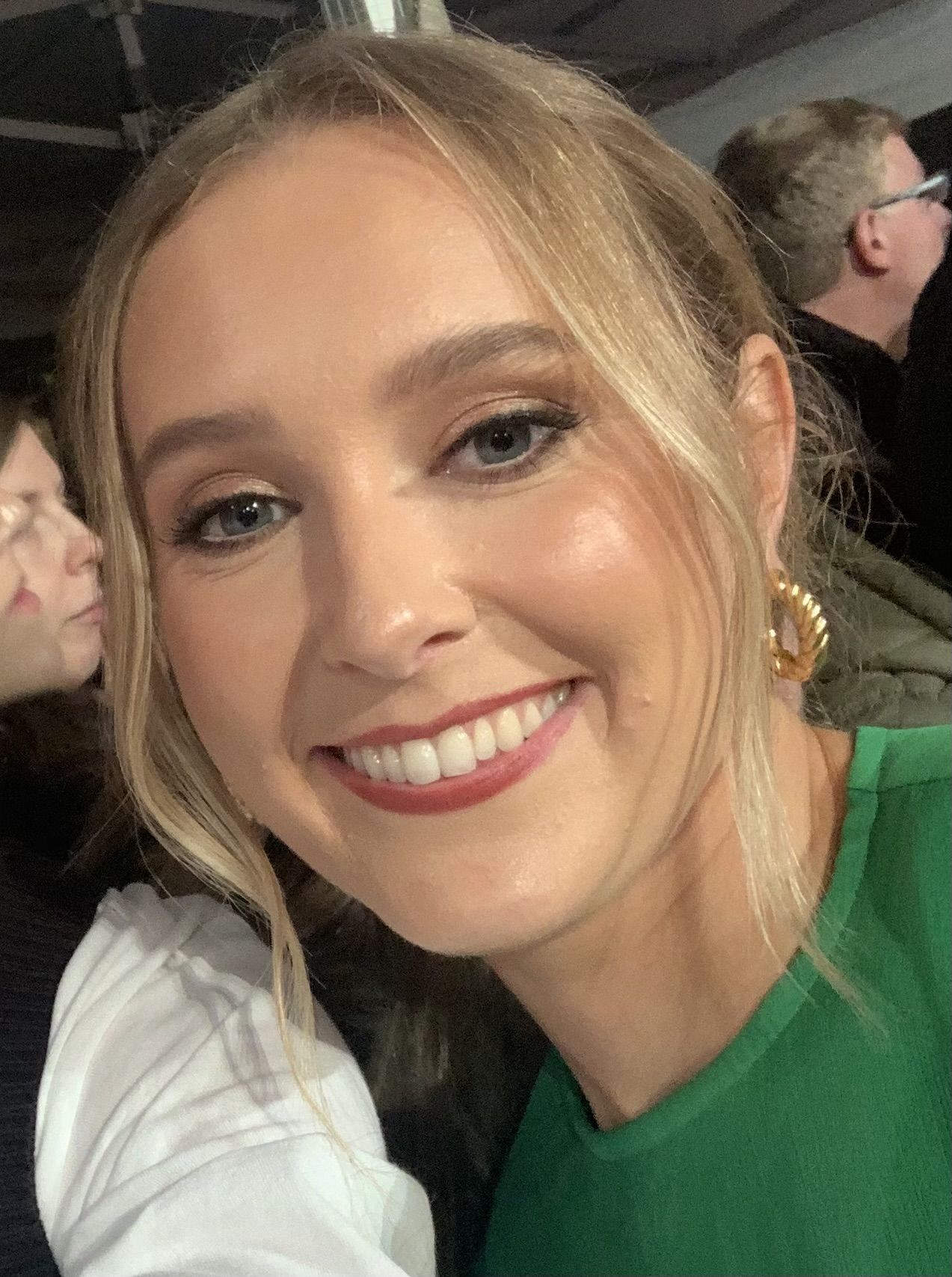
Rose Ayling-Ellis was nominated for Best Soap Newcomer in 2020, as well as Best Soap Performance a year later.

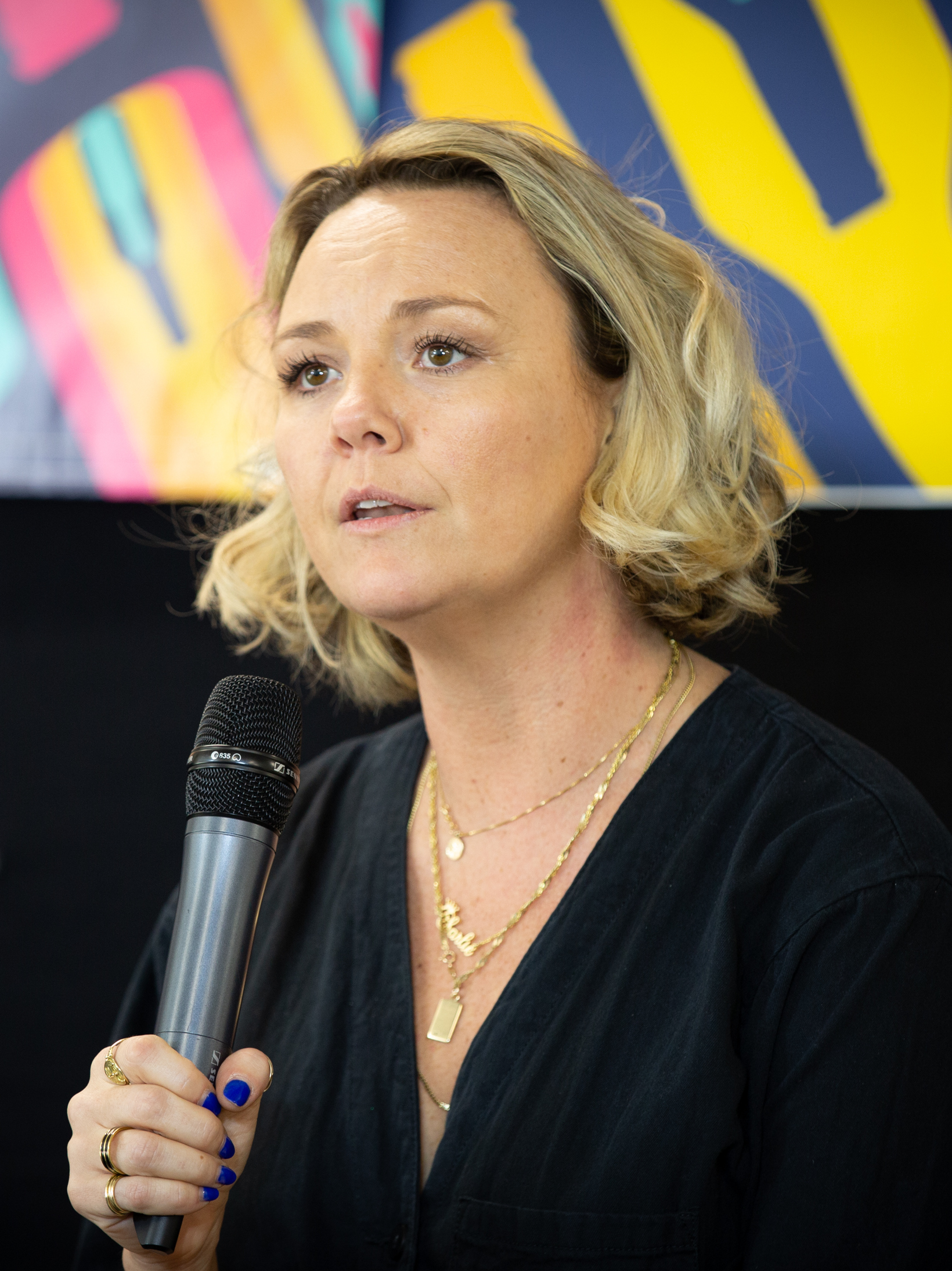
Charlie Brooks was nominated for Best Soap Performance in 2021.

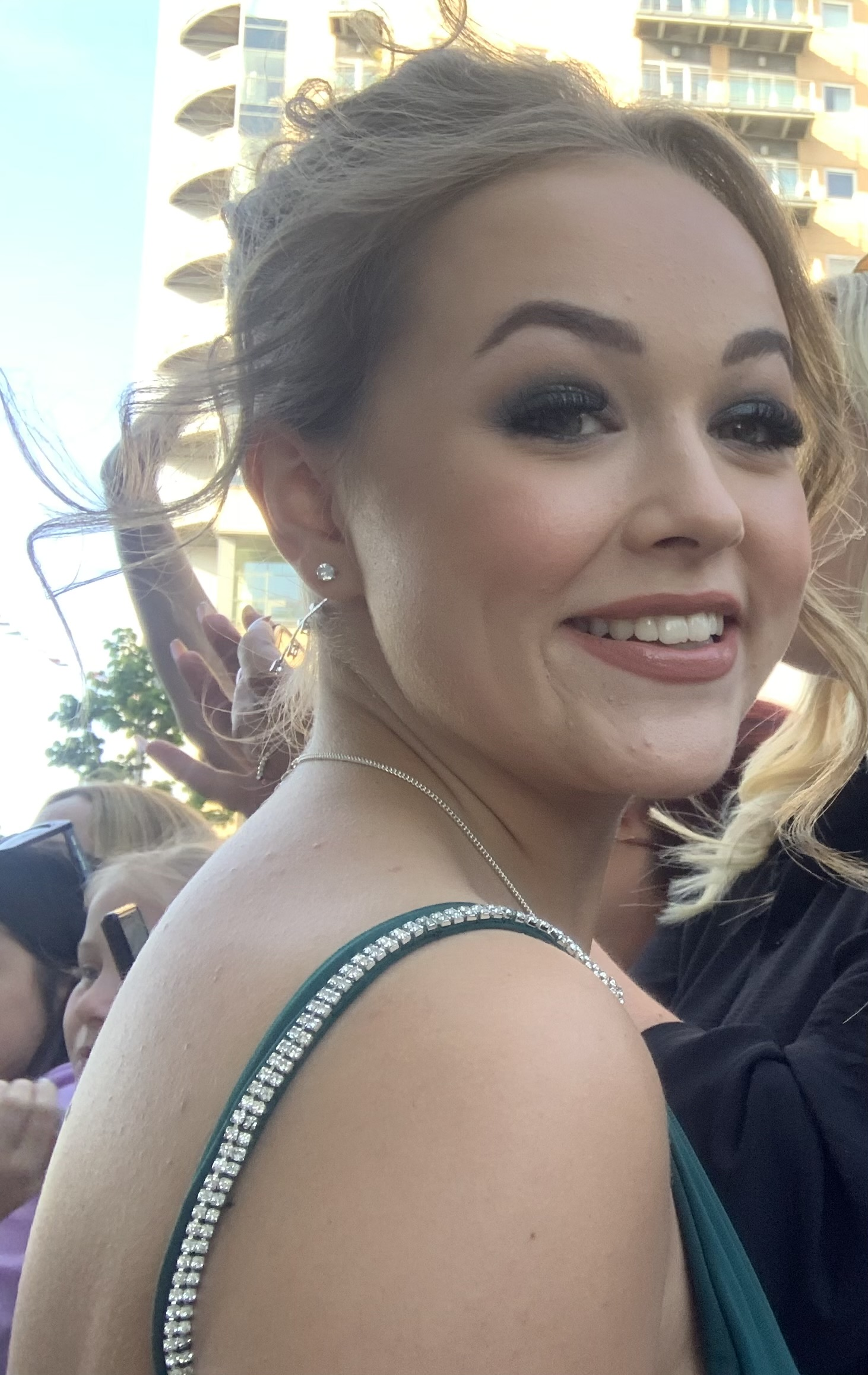
Ellie Dadd was nominated for Best Soap Newcomer in 2022.

Year	Category	Nominee(s)	Result	Ref(s)
2015	Best Soap	EastEnders	Won	
2016	Best Actor in a Soap	Danny Dyer (Mick Carter)	Won	
2016	Best Actress in a Soap	Tameka Empson (Kim Fox)	Second	
2016	Best Actress in a Soap	Lacey Turner (Stacey Slater)	Won	
2016	Best Soap	EastEnders	Won	
2017	Best Soap	EastEnders	Nominated	
2018	Best Soap	EastEnders	Nominated	
2018	Best Soap Newcomer	Ricky Champ (Stuart Highway)	Nominated	
2018	Best Soap Newcomer	Katie Jarvis (Hayley Slater)	Nominated	
2018	Best Soap Newcomer	Charlie Winter (Hunter Owen)	Nominated	
2018	Best Soap Newcomer	Tony Clay (Callum Highway)	Nominated	
2018	Best Soap Partnership	Kellie Bright and Danny Dyer (Linda and Mick Carter)	Nominated	
2018	Best Soap Performance	Bonnie Langford (Carmel Kazemi)	Nominated	
2018	Best Soap Performance	Danny Walters (Keanu Taylor)	Nominated	
2019	Best Soap	EastEnders	Won	
2019	Best Soap Newcomer	Max Bowden (Ben Mitchell)	Won	
2019	Best Soap Newcomer	Kara-Leah Fernandes (Bailey Baker)	Nominated	
2019	Best Soap Newcomer	Jessica Plummer (Chantelle Atkins)	Nominated	
2019	Best Soap Newcomer	Toby-Alexander Smith (Gray Atkins)	Nominated	
2019	Best Soap Partnership	Max Bowden and Tony Clay (Ben Mitchell and Callum "Halfway" Highway)	Nominated	
2019	Best Soap Partnership	Kara-Leah Fernandes and Roger Griffiths (Bailey and Mitch Baker)	Nominated	
2019	Best Soap Performance	Louisa Lytton (Ruby Allen)	Nominated	
2019	Best Soap Performance	Zack Morris (Keegan Baker)	Nominated	
2019	Best Soap Performance	Danny Walters (Keanu Taylor)	Nominated	
2019	Best Soap Performance	Gillian Wright (Jean Slater)	Nominated	
2020	Best Soap	EastEnders	Won	
2020	Best Soap Newcomer	Rose Ayling-Ellis (Frankie Lewis)	Nominated	
2020	Best Soap Newcomer	Stevie Basaula (Isaac Baptiste)	Nominated	
2020	Best Soap Newcomer	Balvinder Sopal (Suki Panesar)	Nominated	
2020	Best Soap Partnership	Max Bowden and Tony Clay (Ben Mitchell and Callum "Halfway" Highway)	Nominated	
2020	Best Soap Partnership	Kellie Bright and Danny Dyer (Linda and Mick Carter)	Nominated	
2020	Best Soap Partnership	Jessica Plummer and Toby-Alexander Smith (Chantelle and Gray Atkins)	Nominated	
2020	Best Soap Partnership	Zack Morris and Maisie Smith (Keegan Baker and Tiffany Butcher)	Nominated	
2020	Best Soap Performance	Jaz Deol (Kheerat Panesar)	Nominated	
2020	Best Soap Performance	Shona McGarty (Whitney Dean)	Nominated	
2020	Best Soap Performance	Diane Parish (Denise Fox)	Nominated	
2020	Best Soap Performance	Lorraine Stanley (Karen Taylor)	Nominated	
2021	Best Soap	EastEnders	Nominated	
2021	Best Soap Newcomer	Ruhtxjiaïh Bèllènéa (Mila Marwa)	Nominated	
2021	Best Soap Newcomer	James Farrar (Zack Hudson)	Nominated	
2021	Best Soap Newcomer	Barbara Smith (Dana Monroe)	Nominated	
2021	Best Soap Performance	Stevie Basaula (Isaac Baptiste)	Nominated	
2021	Best Soap Performance	Charlie Brooks (Janine Butcher)	Nominated	
2021	Best Soap Performance	Rose Ayling-Ellis (Frankie Lewis)	Nominated	
2021	Best Soap Partnership	Max Bowden and Tony Clay (Ben Mitchell and Callum "Halfway" Highway)	Nominated	
2021	Best Soap Partnership	Kellie Bright and Danny Dyer (Linda and Mick Carter)	Nominated	
2021	Best Soap Partnership	Tameka Empson and Diane Parish (Kim and Denise Fox)	Nominated	
2022	Best Soap	EastEnders	Won	
2022	Best Soap Newcomer	Bobby Brazier (Freddie Slater)	Nominated	
2022	Best Soap Newcomer	Ellie Dadd (Amy Mitchell)	Nominated	
2022	Best Soap Newcomer	Aaron Thiara (Ravi Gulati)	Nominated	
2022	Best Soap Partnership	Delroy Atkinson and Tameka Empson (Howie Danes and Kim Fox)	Nominated	
2022	Best Soap Partnership	Charlie Brooks and Danny Dyer (Janine and Mick Carter)	Nominated	
2022	Best Soap Partnership	Ashley Byam and Matthew Morrison (Felix and Finlay Baker)	Nominated	
2022	Best Soap Performance	Max Bowden (Ben Mitchell)	Won	
2022	Best Soap Performance	Gillian Wright (Jean Slater)	Nominated	
2023	Best Soap	EastEnders	Won	
2023	Best Soap Newcomer	Francesca Henry (Gina Knight)	Nominated	
2023	Best Soap Newcomer	Molly Rainford (Anna Knight)	Nominated	
2023	Best Soap Newcomer	William Ellis (Theo Hawthorne)	Nominated	
2023	Best Soap Partnership	[Adam Woodyatt & Michelle Collins (Iain & Cindy Beale)	Nominated	
2023	Best Soap Partnership	Max Bowden & Tony Clay (Ben Mitchell & Callum Highway)	Won	
2023	Best Soap Partnership	Delroy Atkinson & Tameka Empson (Howie Danes & Chelsea Fox)	Nominated	
2023	Best Soap Performance	Danielle Harold (Lola Pearce)	Won	
2023	Best Soap Performance	Lacey Turner (Stacey Slater)	Nominated	

== National Television Awards ==
The National Television Awards were first awarded in 1995. EastEnders has won in the Serial Drama category 11 times. The most awarded cast member at the National Television Awards is Lacey Turner for her role as Stacey Slater, with a total of eight nominations and four wins.

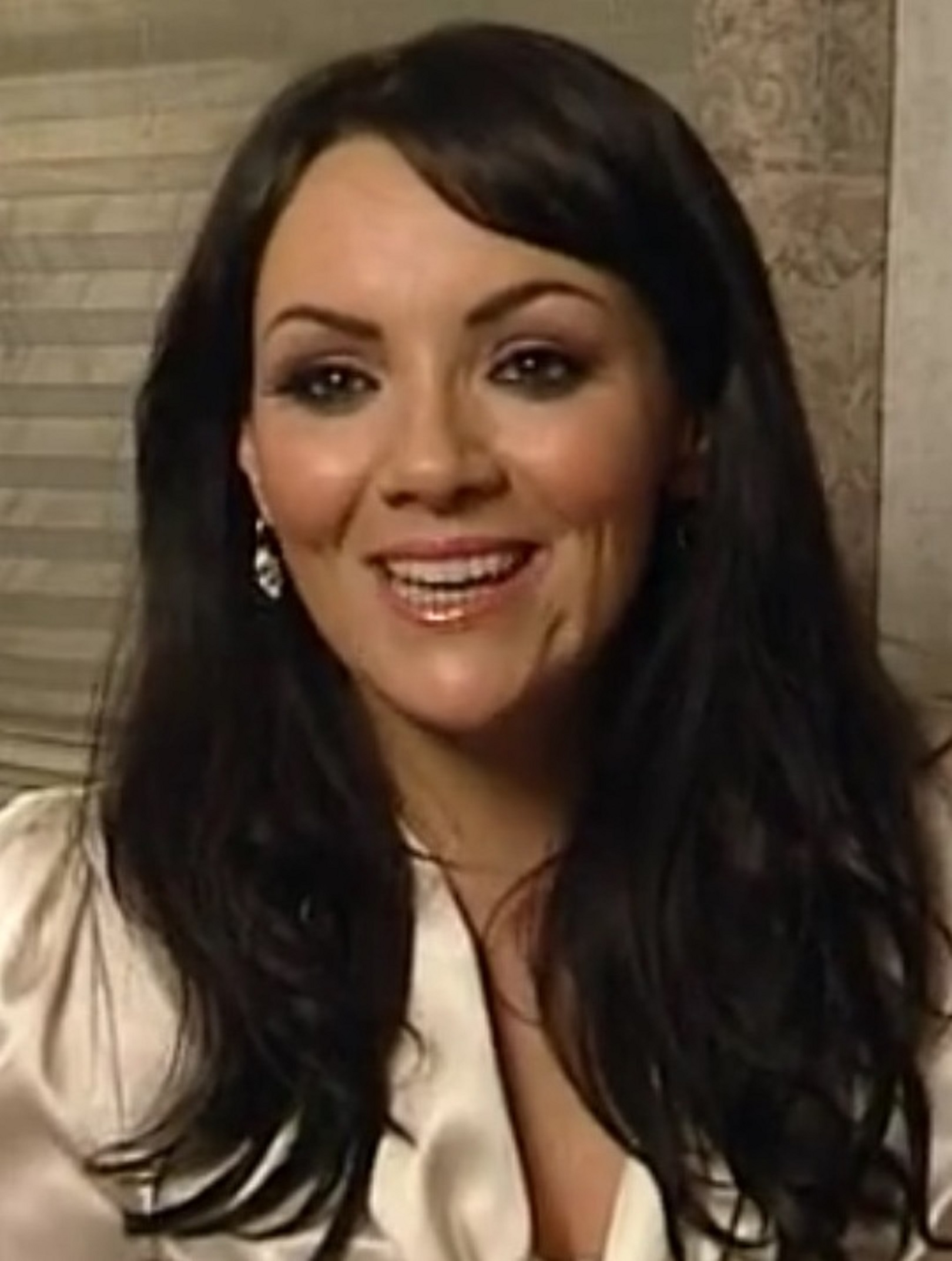
Martine McCutcheon (Tiffany Mitchell) won Most Popular Actress at the National Television Awards in 1997.

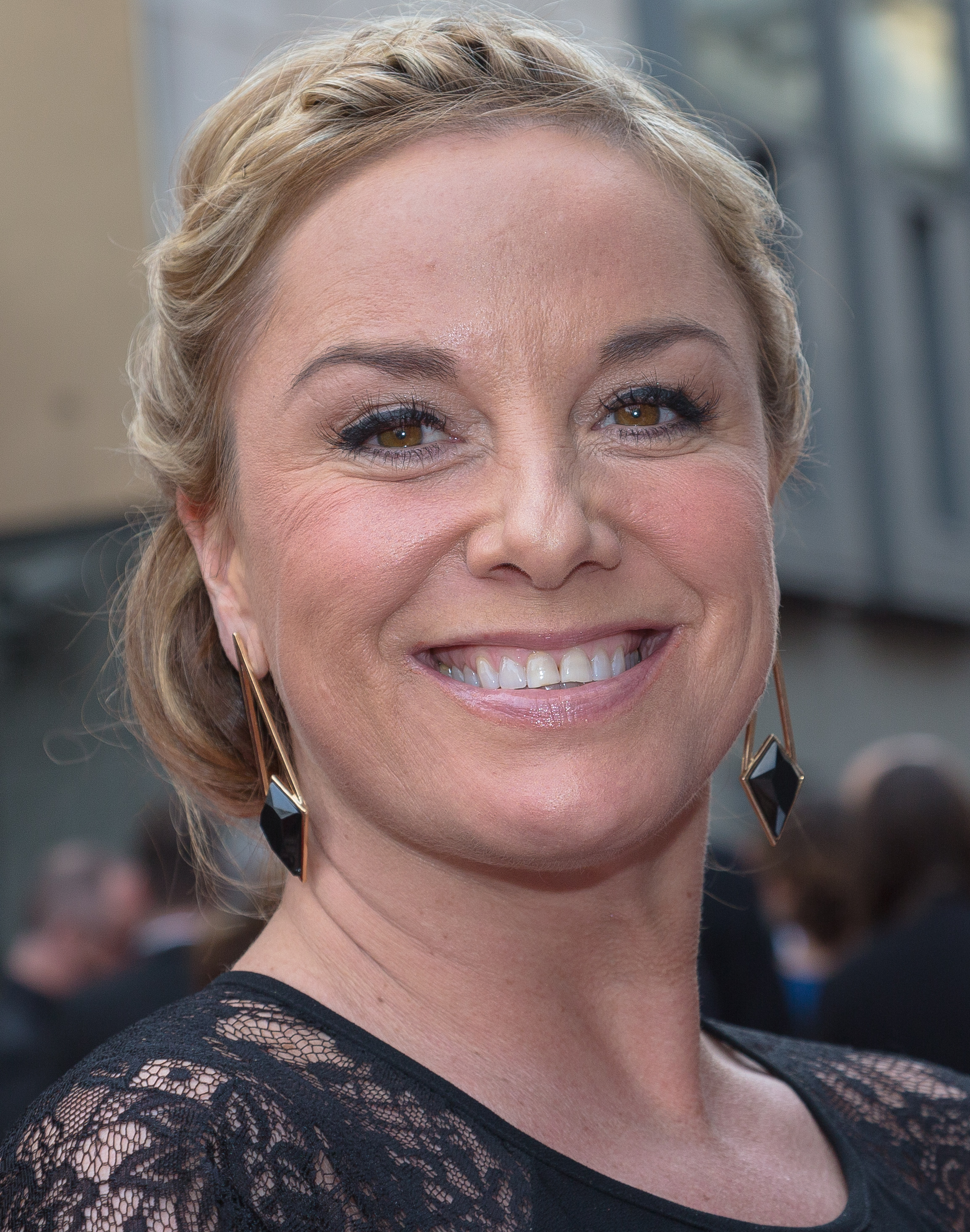
Tamzin Outhwaite (Mel Owen) won Most Popular Newcomer at the National Television Awards in 1999.

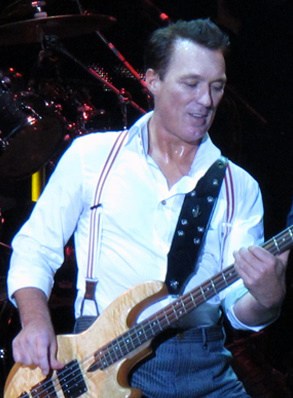
Martin Kemp (Steve Owen) won Most Popular Actor at the National Television Awards in 2000.

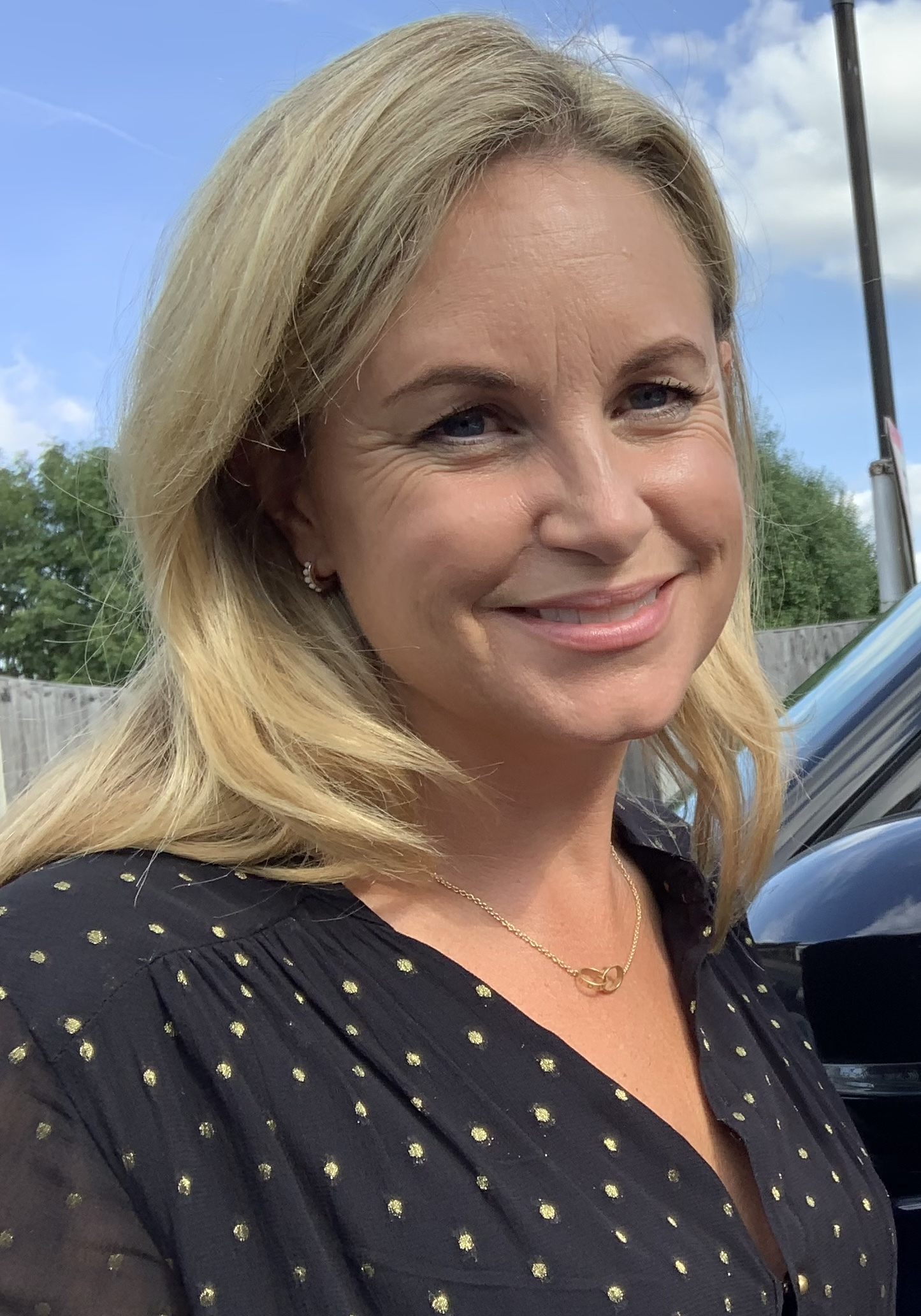
Kim Medcalf (Sam Mitchell) won Most Popular Newcomer at the National Television Awards in 2002.

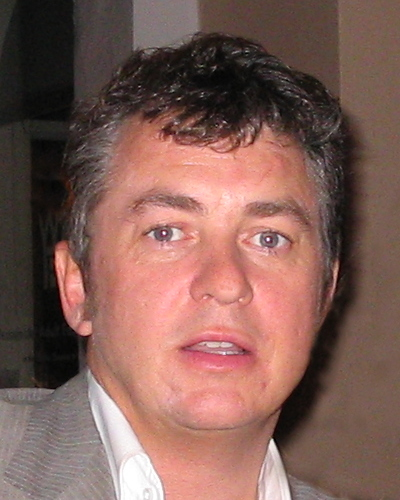
Shane Richie (Alfie Moon) won Most Popular Actor at the National Television Awards in 2003.

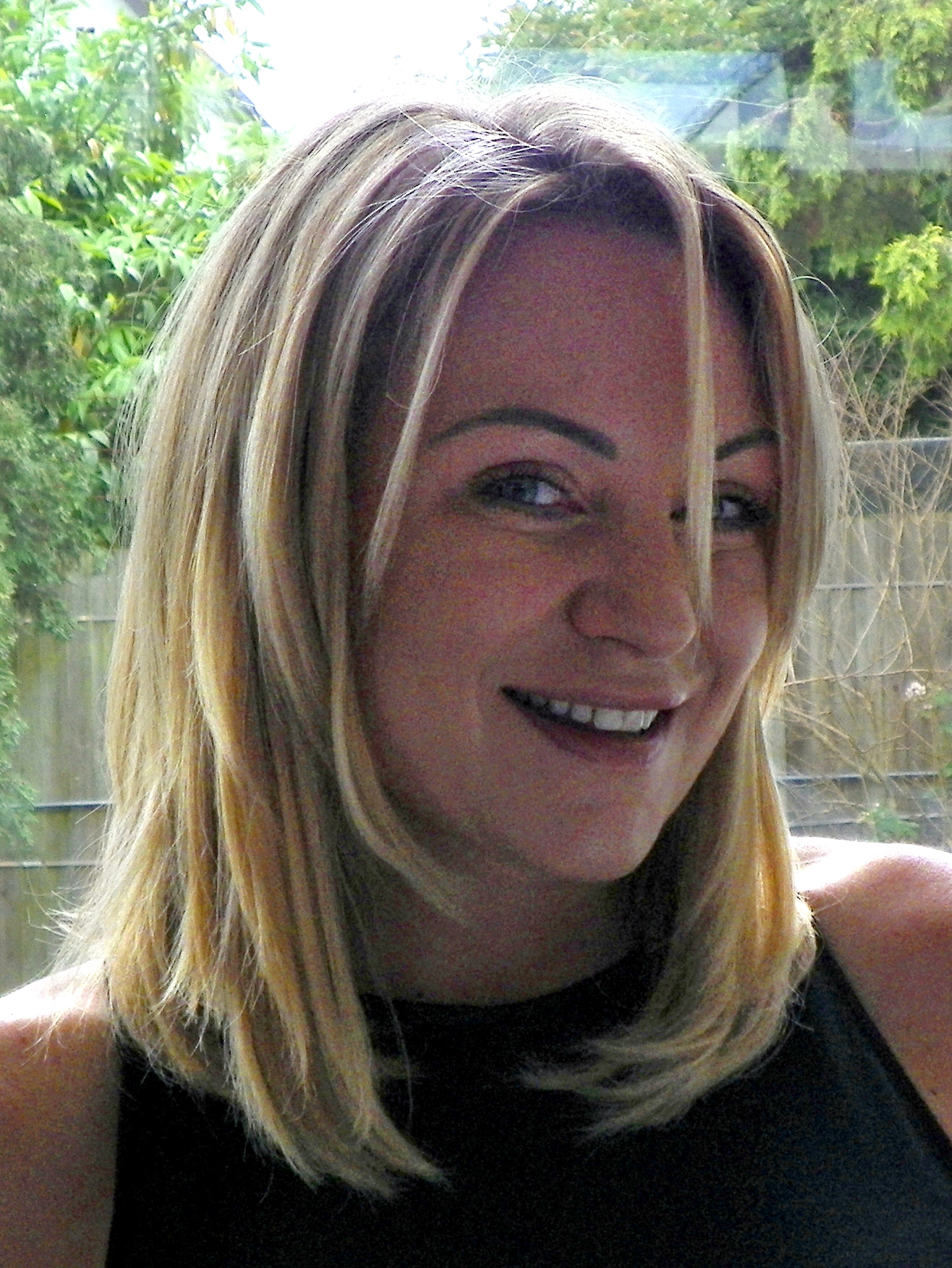
Rita Simons (Roxy Mitchell) won Most Popular Newcomer at the National Television Awards in 2008.

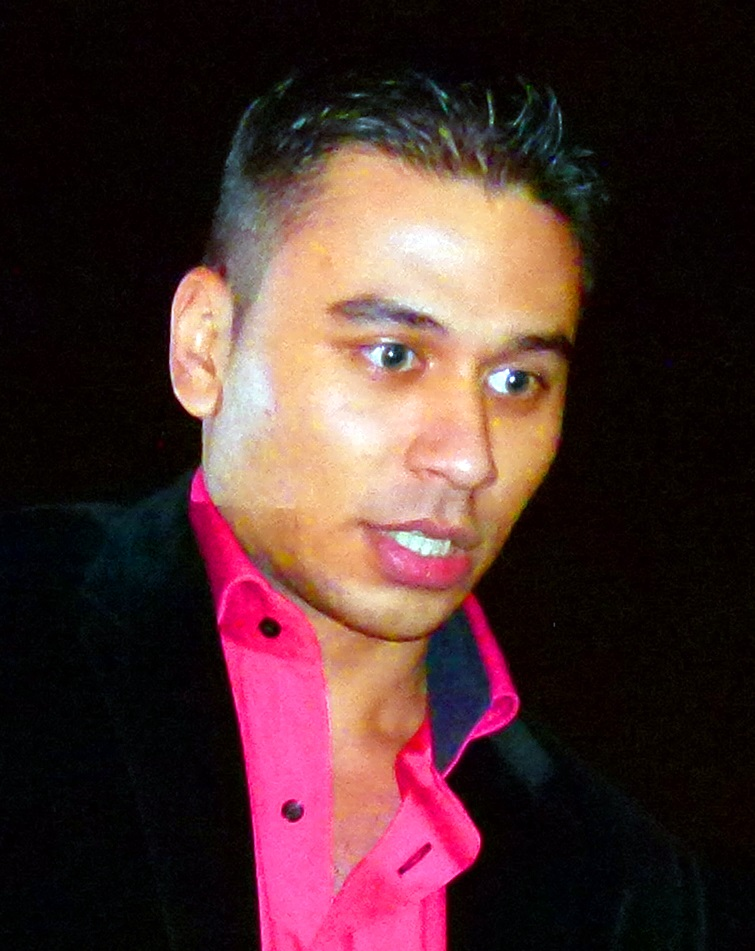
Ricky Norwood (Fatboy) was awarded Newcomer in 2011.

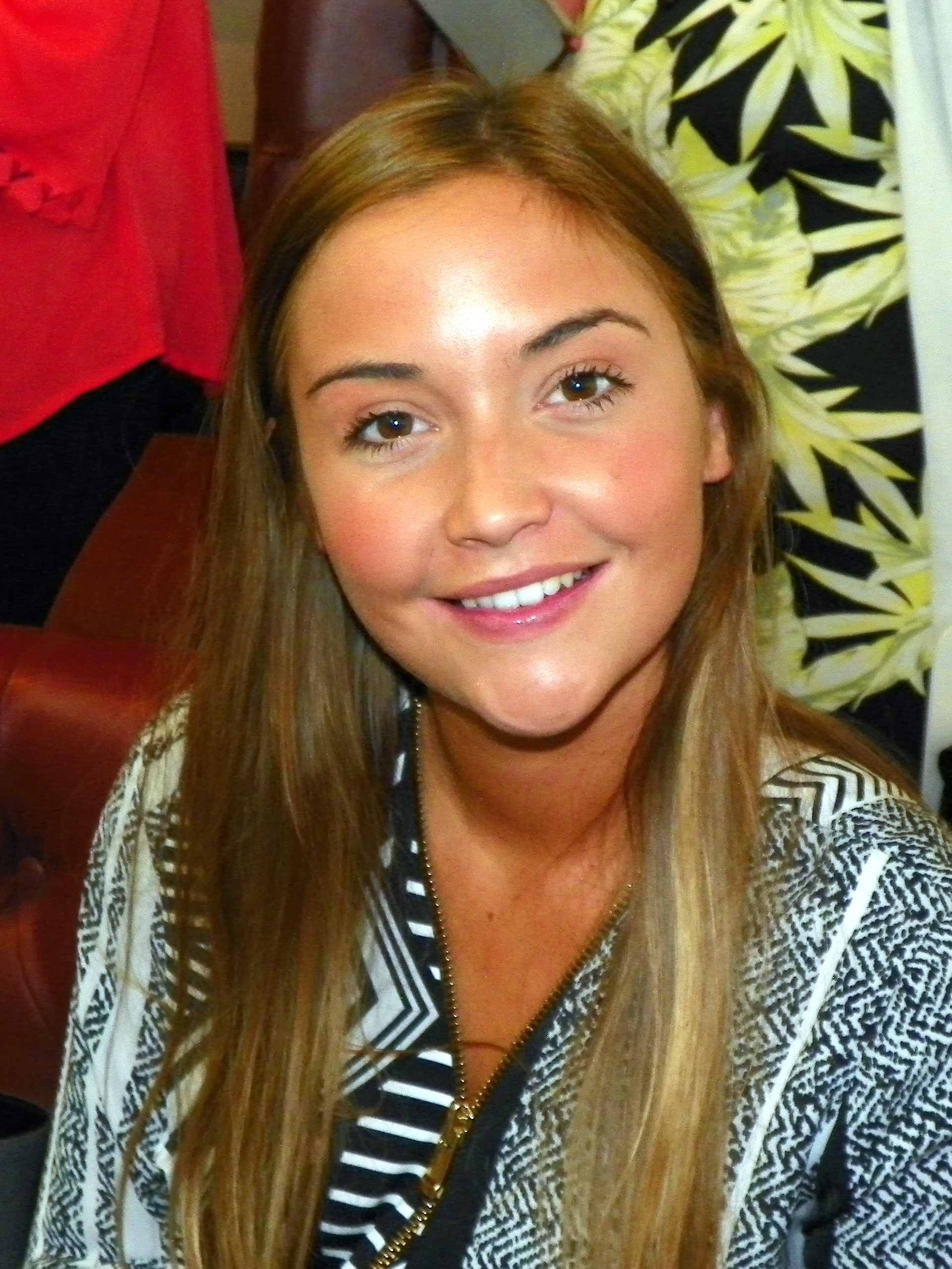
Jacqueline Jossa (Lauren Branning) was awarded Newcomer in 2012.

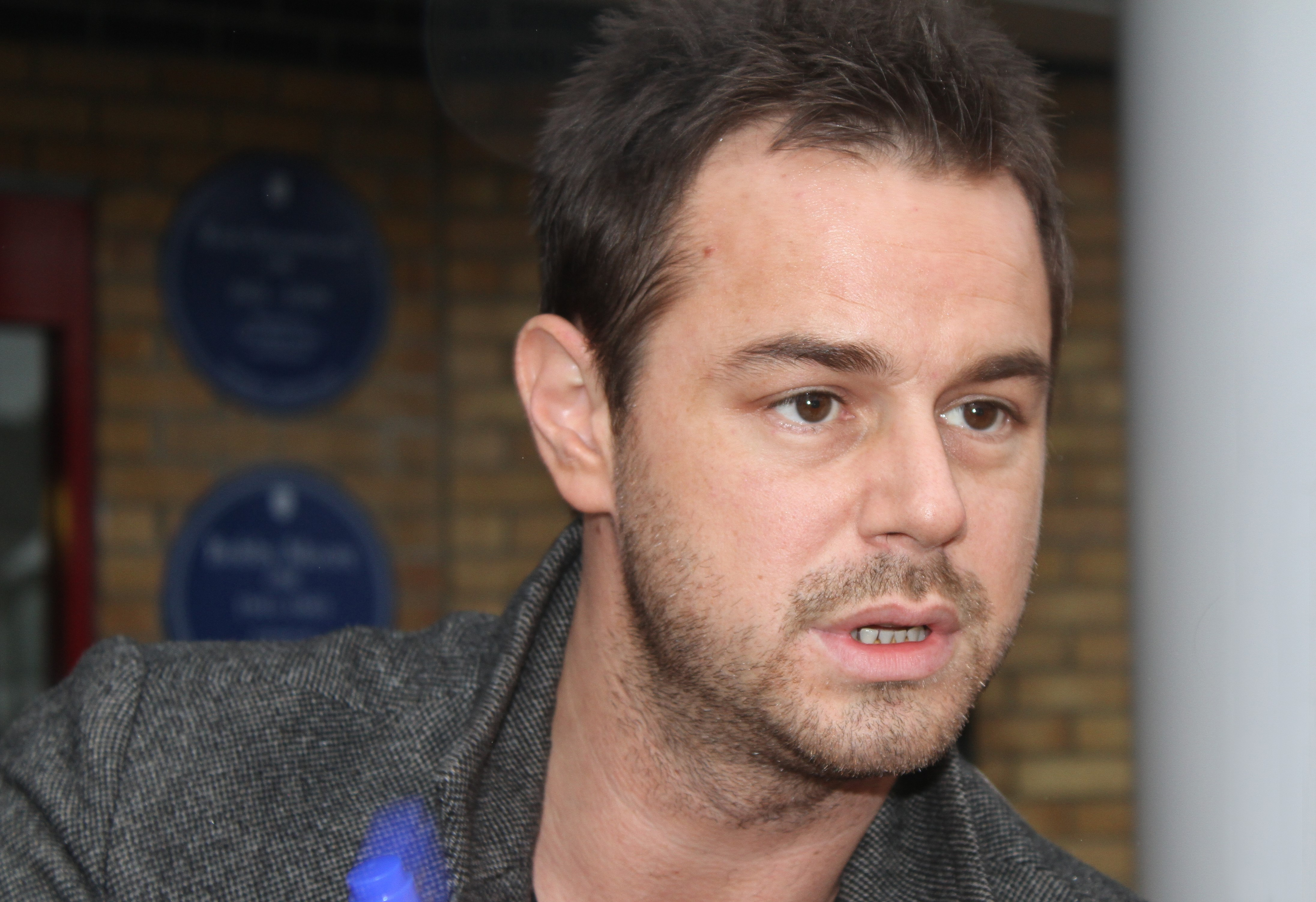
Danny Dyer (Mick Carter) was awarded Serial Drama Performance in 2015, 2016 and 2019.

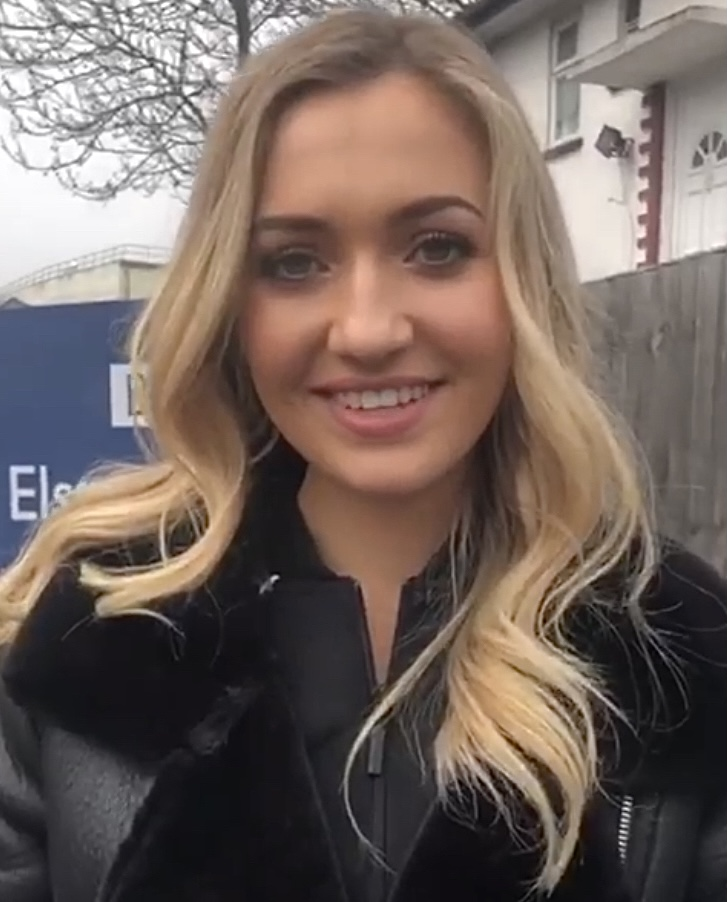
Tilly Keeper (Louise Mitchell) was nominated for Newcomer in 2017.

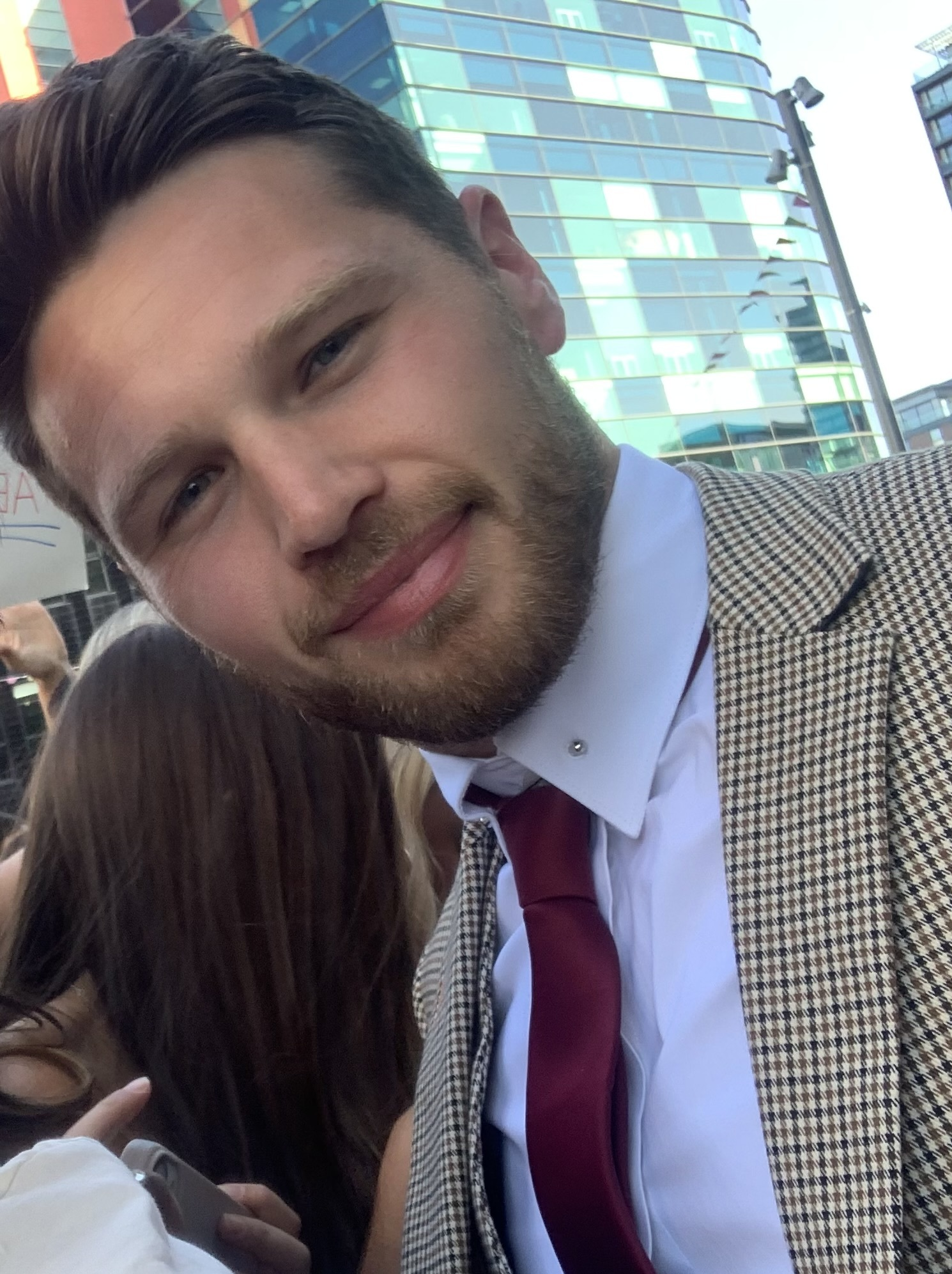
Danny Walters (Keanu Taylor) was awarded Newcomer in 2018.

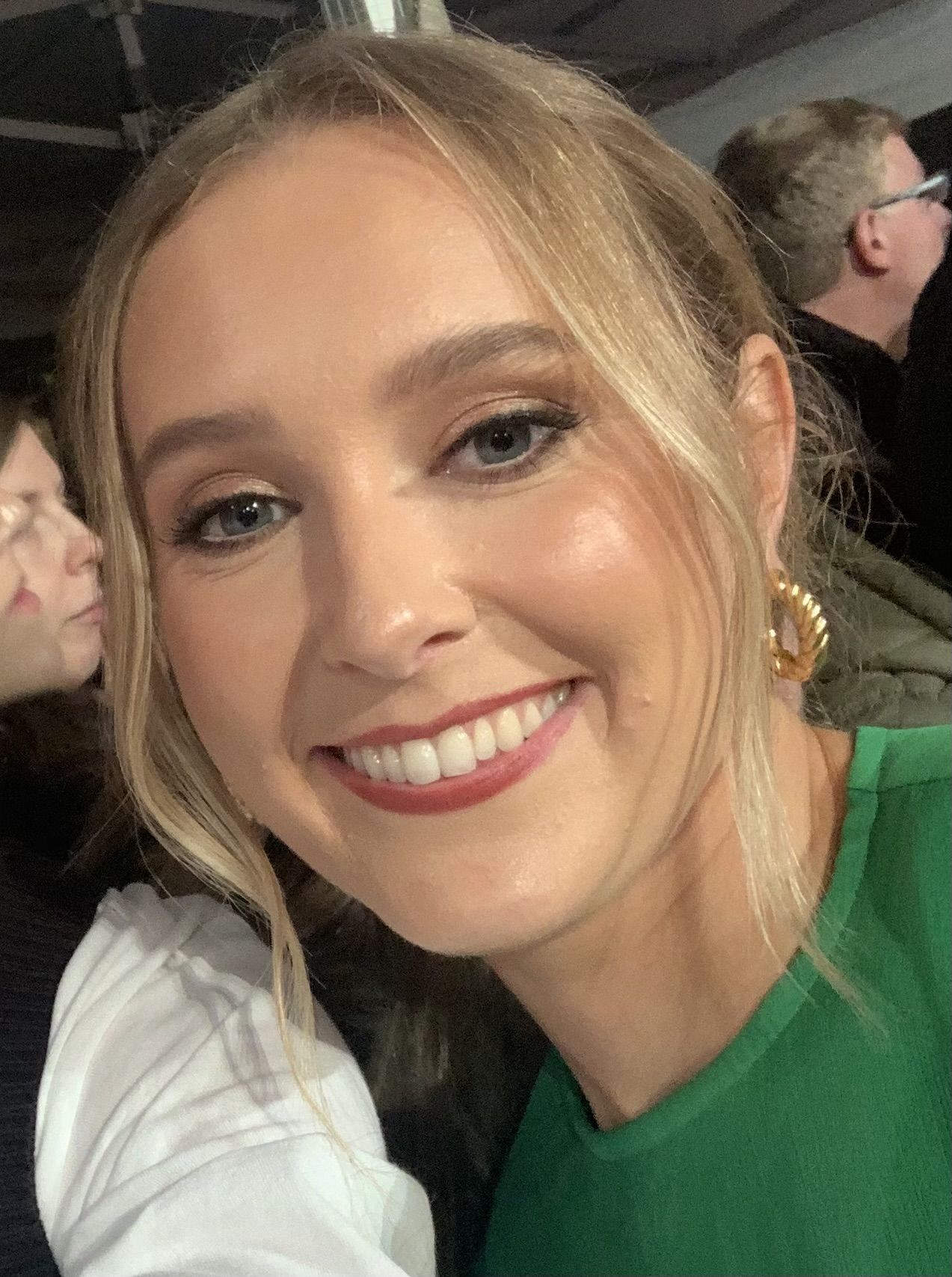
Rose Ayling-Ellis (Frankie Lewis) was nominated for the Newcomer award in 2021, and a year later, was shortlisted for the Serial Drama Performance award.

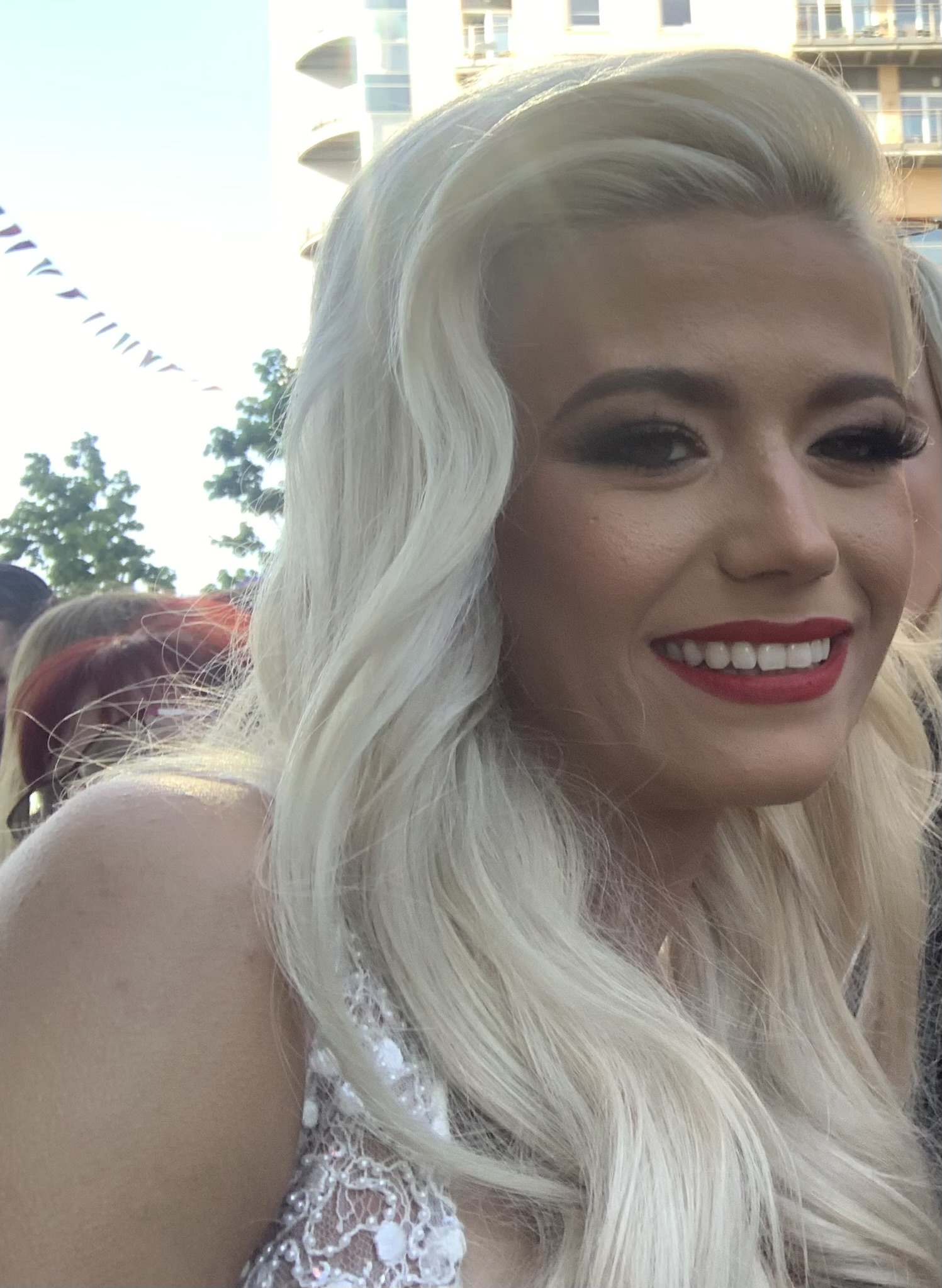
Danielle Harold (Lola Pearce-Brown) was awarded Serial Drama Performance in 2023.

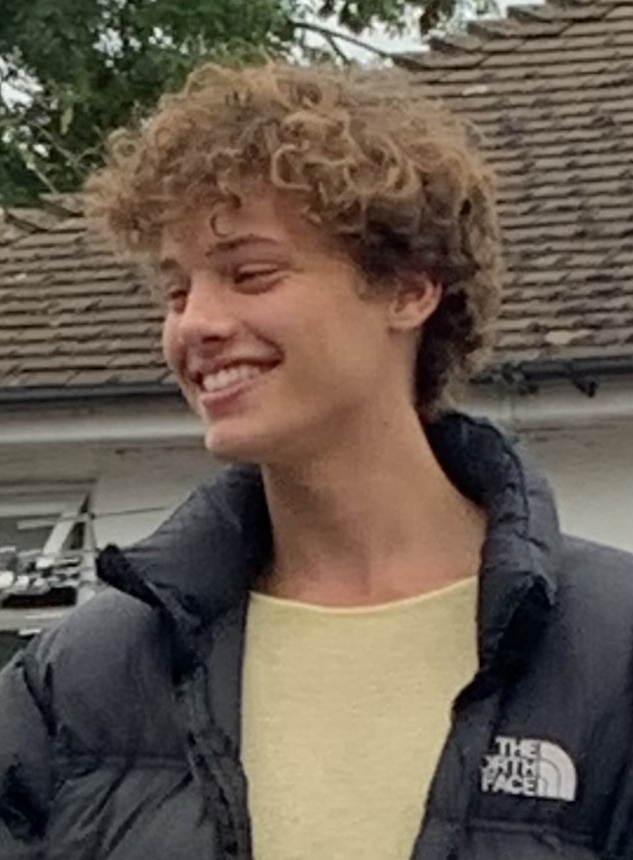
Bobby Brazier (Freddie Slater) was awarded Rising Star in 2023.

Year	Category	Nominee(s)	Result	Ref(s)
1995	Most Popular Actor	Ross Kemp (Grant Mitchell)	Nominated	
1995	Most Popular Actress	Letitia Dean (Sharon Watts)	Nominated	
1995	Most Popular Newcomer	Patsy Palmer (Bianca Jackson)	Nominated	
1995	Most Popular Serial Drama	EastEnders	Nominated	
1996	Most Popular Actor	Ross Kemp (Grant Mitchell)	Nominated	
1996	Most Popular Actress	Patsy Palmer (Bianca Jackson)	Nominated	
1996	Most Popular Newcomer	Paul Nicholls (Joe Wicks)	Nominated	
1996	Most Popular Serial Drama	EastEnders	Won	
1997	Most Popular Actor	Ross Kemp (Grant Mitchell)	Nominated	
1997	Most Popular Actor	Paul Nicholls (Joe Wicks)	Nominated	
1997	Most Popular Actress	Martine McCutcheon (Tiffany Mitchell)	Won	
1997	Most Popular Serial Drama	EastEnders	Won	
1998	Most Popular Actor	Ross Kemp (Grant Mitchell)	Nominated	
1998	Most Popular Serial Drama	EastEnders	Nominated	
1999	Most Popular Actor	Joe Absolom (Matthew Rose)	Nominated	
1999	Most Popular Newcomer	Tamzin Outhwaite (Melanie Healy)	Won	
1999	Most Popular Newcomer	Jack Ryder (Jamie Mitchell)	Nominated	
1999	Most Popular Serial Drama	EastEnders	Nominated	
2000	Most Popular Actor	Martin Kemp (Steve Owen)	Won	
2000	Most Popular Actress	Tamzin Outhwaite (Melanie Healy)	Nominated	
2000	Most Popular Newcomer	Charlie Brooks (Janine Butcher)	Nominated	
2000	Most Popular Newcomer	Perry Fenwick (Billy Mitchell)	Nominated	
2000	Most Popular Serial Drama	EastEnders	Nominated	
2001	Most Popular Actor	Martin Kemp (Steve Owen)	Nominated	
2001	Most Popular Actor	Steve McFadden (Phil Mitchell)	Nominated	
2001	Most Popular Actress	Lucy Benjamin (Lisa Fowler)	Nominated	
2001	Most Popular Actress	June Brown (Dot Branning)	Nominated	
2001	Most Popular Newcomer	Kacey Ainsworth (Little Mo Mitchell)	Nominated	
2001	Most Popular Newcomer	Jessie Wallace (Kat Slater)	Won	
2001	Most Popular Serial Drama	EastEnders	Won	
2002	Most Popular Actor	Perry Fenwick (Billy Mitchell)	Nominated	
2002	Most Popular Actor	Alex Ferns (Trevor Morgan)	Nominated	
2002	Most Popular Actor	Steve McFadden (Phil Mitchell)	Nominated	
2002	Most Popular Actress	Kacey Ainsworth (Little Mo Mitchell)	Won	
2002	Most Popular Actress	Jessie Wallace (Kat Slater)	Nominated	
2002	Most Popular Newcomer	Kim Medcalf (Sam Mitchell)	Won	
2002	Most Popular Serial Drama	EastEnders	Won	
2003	Most Popular Actor	Shane Richie (Alfie Moon)	Won	
2003	Most Popular Actress	Jessie Wallace (Kat Slater)	Won	
2003	Most Popular Newcomer	Nigel Harman (Dennis Rickman)	Won	
2003	Most Popular Serial Drama	EastEnders	Won	
2004	Most Popular Actor	Nigel Harman (Dennis Rickman)	Nominated	
2004	Most Popular Actor	Shane Richie (Alfie Moon)	Nominated	
2004	Most Popular Actress	Jessie Wallace (Kat Slater)	Nominated	
2004	Most Popular Newcomer	Tracy-Ann Oberman (Chrissie Watts)	Nominated	
2004	Most Popular Serial Drama	EastEnders	Nominated	
2005	Most Popular Actor	Nigel Harman (Dennis Rickman)	Shortlisted	
2005	Most Popular Actor	Shane Richie (Alfie Moon)	Shortlisted	
2005	Most Popular Actor	Perry Fenwick (Billy Mitchell)	Longlisted	
2005	Most Popular Actress	June Brown (Dot Branning)	Shortlisted	
2005	Most Popular Actress	Tracy-Ann Oberman (Chrissie Watts)	Longlisted	
2005	Most Popular Actress	Jessie Wallace (Kat Slater)	Shortlisted	
2005	Most Popular Newcomer	Lacey Turner (Stacey Slater)	Shortlisted	
2005	Most Popular Serial Drama	EastEnders	Won	
2006	Most Popular Actor	Perry Fenwick (Billy Mitchell)	Longlisted	
2006	Most Popular Actor	Ross Kemp (Grant Mitchell)	Shortlisted	
2006	Most Popular Actor	Steve McFadden (Phil Mitchell)	Longlisted	
2006	Most Popular Actress	Laurie Brett (Jane Beale)	Longlisted	
2006	Most Popular Actress	Natalie Cassidy (Sonia Fowler)	Longlisted	
2006	Most Popular Actress	Lacey Turner (Stacey Slater)	Shortlisted	
2006	Most Popular Newcomer	Charlie Clements (Bradley Branning)	Won	
2006	Most Popular Serial Drama	EastEnders	Won	
2007	Most Popular Actor	Charlie Clements (Bradley Branning)	Longlisted	
2007	Most Popular Actress	Lacey Turner (Stacey Slater)	Won	
2007	Most Popular Actress	Kara Tointon (Dawn Swann)	Longlisted	
2007	Most Popular Newcomer	Jo Joyner (Tanya Branning)	Longlisted	
2007	Most Popular Serial Drama	EastEnders	Won	
2008	Most Popular Newcomer	Rita Simons (Roxy Mitchell)	Won	
2008	Most Popular Serial Drama	EastEnders	Won	
2008	Outstanding Serial Drama Performance	June Brown (Dot Branning)	Longlisted	
2008	Outstanding Serial Drama Performance	Charlie Clements (Bradley Branning)	Longlisted	
2008	Outstanding Serial Drama Performance	Steve McFadden (Phil Mitchell)	Longlisted	
2008	Outstanding Serial Drama Performance	Lacey Turner (Stacey Slater)	Longlisted	
2008	Outstanding Serial Drama Performance	Barbara Windsor (Peggy Mitchell)	Longlisted	
2008	Outstanding Serial Drama Performance	Adam Woodyatt (Ian Beale)	Longlisted	
2010	Most Popular Newcomer	Neil McDermott (Ryan Malloy)	Shortlisted	
2010	Most Popular Serial Drama	EastEnders	Nominated	
2010	Outstanding Serial Drama Performance	Steve McFadden (Phil Mitchell)	Longlisted	
2010	Outstanding Serial Drama Performance	Diane Parish (Denise Wicks)	Longlisted	
2010	Outstanding Serial Drama Performance	Lacey Turner (Stacey Slater)	Won	
2010	Outstanding Serial Drama Performance	Barbara Windsor (Peggy Mitchell)	Longlisted	
2010	Outstanding Serial Drama Performance	Jake Wood (Max Branning)	Longlisted	
2010	Outstanding Serial Drama Performance	Adam Woodyatt (Ian Beale)	Longlisted	
2011	Newcomer	Ricky Norwood (Fatboy)	Won	
2011	Serial Drama	EastEnders	Won	
2011	Serial Drama Performance	Lindsey Coulson (Carol Jackson)	Longlisted	
2011	Serial Drama Performance	Marc Elliott (Syed Masood)	Longlisted	
2011	Serial Drama Performance	Don Gilet (Lucas Johnson)	Longlisted	
2011	Serial Drama Performance	Steve McFadden (Phil Mitchell)	Shortlisted	
2011	Serial Drama Performance	Diane Parish (Denise Johnson)	Longlisted	
2011	Serial Drama Performance	Lacey Turner (Stacey Slater)	Won	
2012	Newcomer	Jacqueline Jossa (Lauren Branning)	Won	
2012	Serial Drama	EastEnders	Nominated	
2012	Serial Drama Performance	Lindsey Coulson (Carol Jackson)	Longlisted	
2012	Serial Drama Performance	Nitin Ganatra (Masood Ahmed)	Longlisted	
2012	Serial Drama Performance	Steve McFadden (Phil Mitchell)	Longlisted	
2012	Serial Drama Performance	Nina Wadia (Zainab Masood)	Longlisted	
2012	Serial Drama Performance	Jessie Wallace (Kat Moon)	Shortlisted	
2012	Serial Drama Performance	Jake Wood (Max Branning)	Longlisted	
2013	Newcomer	David Witts (Joey Branning)	Won	
2013	Serial Drama	EastEnders	Nominated	
2013	Serial Drama Performance	Nitin Ganatra (Masood Ahmed)	Longlisted	
2013	Serial Drama Performance	Jacqueline Jossa (Lauren Branning)	Longlisted	
2013	Serial Drama Performance	Ann Mitchell (Cora Cross)	Longlisted	
2013	Serial Drama Performance	Steve John Shepherd (Michael Moon)	Longlisted	
2013	Serial Drama Performance	Nina Wadia (Zainab Masood)	Longlisted	
2013	Serial Drama Performance	Adam Woodyatt (Ian Beale)	Shortlisted	
2014	Newcomer	Khali Best (Dexter Hartman)	Won	
2014	Serial Drama	EastEnders	Nominated	
2014	Serial Drama Performance	Lindsey Coulson (Carol Jackson)	Longlisted	
2014	Serial Drama Performance	Steve McFadden (Phil Mitchell)	Longlisted	
2014	Serial Drama Performance	Diane Parish (Denise Fox)	Longlisted	
2014	Serial Drama Performance	Jessie Wallace (Kat Moon)	Shortlisted	
2014	Serial Drama Performance	Jake Wood (Max Branning)	Longlisted	
2014	Serial Drama Performance	Adam Woodyatt (Ian Beale)	Longlisted	
2015	Newcomer	Maddy Hill (Nancy Carter)	Won	
2015	Serial Drama	EastEnders	Won	
2015	Serial Drama Performance	Kellie Bright (Linda Carter)	Shortlisted	
2015	Serial Drama Performance	Danny Dyer (Mick Carter)	Won	
2015	Serial Drama Performance	Linda Henry (Shirley Carter)	Longlisted	
2015	Serial Drama Performance	Shane Richie (Alfie Moon)	Longlisted	
2015	Serial Drama Performance	Jessie Wallace (Kat Moon)	Longlisted	
2015	Serial Drama Performance	Adam Woodyatt (Ian Beale)	Longlisted	
2016	Newcomer	Richard Blackwood (Vincent Hubbard)	Nominated	
2016	Serial Drama	EastEnders	Won	
2016	Serial Drama Performance	Kellie Bright (Linda Carter)	Longlisted	
2016	Serial Drama Performance	Letitia Dean (Sharon Mitchell)	Longlisted	
2016	Serial Drama Performance	Danny Dyer (Mick Carter)	Won	
2016	Serial Drama Performance	Davood Ghadami (Kush Kazemi)	Longlisted	
2016	Serial Drama Performance	Steve McFadden (Phil Mitchell)	Longlisted	
2016	Serial Drama Performance	Rakhee Thakrar (Shabnam Masood)	Shortlisted	
2017	Newcomer	Tilly Keeper (Louise Mitchell)	Nominated	
2017	Serial Drama	EastEnders	Nominated	
2017	Serial Drama Performance	Danny Dyer (Mick Carter)	Longlisted	
2017	Serial Drama Performance	Steve McFadden (Phil Mitchell)	Longlisted	
2017	Serial Drama Performance	Shona McGarty (Whitney Dean)	Longlisted	
2017	Serial Drama Performance	Diane Parish (Denise Fox)	Longlisted	
2017	Serial Drama Performance	Harry Reid (Ben Mitchell)	Longlisted	
2017	Serial Drama Performance	Lacey Turner (Stacey Fowler)	Won	
2018	Newcomer	Danny Walters (Keanu Taylor)	Won	
2018	Serial Drama	EastEnders	Nominated	
2018	Serial Drama Performance	Danny Dyer (Mick Carter)	Longlisted	
2018	Serial Drama Performance	Scott Maslen (Jack Branning)	Longlisted	
2018	Serial Drama Performance	Shona McGarty (Whitney Carter)	Longlisted	
2018	Serial Drama Performance	Diane Parish (Denise Fox)	Longlisted	
2018	Serial Drama Performance	Lacey Turner (Stacey Fowler)	Shortlisted	
2018	Serial Drama Performance	Jake Wood (Max Branning)	Longlisted	
2019	Newcomer	Ricky Champ (Stuart Highway)	Nominated	
2019	Serial Drama	EastEnders	Nominated	
2019	Serial Drama Performance	Kellie Bright (Linda Carter)	Longlisted	
2019	Serial Drama Performance	Danny Dyer (Mick Carter)	Won	
2019	Serial Drama Performance	Tanya Franks (Rainie Branning)	Longlisted	
2019	Serial Drama Performance	Davood Ghadami (Kush Kazemi)	Longlisted	
2019	Serial Drama Performance	Bonnie Langford (Carmel Kazemi)	Shortlisted	
2019	Serial Drama Performance	Zack Morris (Keegan Baker)	Longlisted	
2020	Newcomer	Max Bowden (Ben Mitchell)	Nominated	
2020	Serial Drama	EastEnders	Nominated	
2020	Serial Drama Performance	Kellie Bright (Linda Carter)	Longlisted	
2020	Serial Drama Performance	James Bye (Martin Fowler)	Longlisted	
2020	Serial Drama Performance	Danny Dyer (Mick Carter)	Shortlisted	
2020	Serial Drama Performance	Shona McGarty (Whitney Dean)	Longlisted	
2020	Serial Drama Performance	Zack Morris (Keegan Baker)	Longlisted	
2021	Newcomer	Rose Ayling-Ellis (Frankie Lewis)	Nominated	
2021	Serial Drama	EastEnders	Nominated	
2021	Serial Drama Performance	Kellie Bright (Linda Carter)	Longlisted	
2021	Serial Drama Performance	Tony Clay (Callum Highway)	Longlisted	
2021	Serial Drama Performance	Jaz Deol (Kheerat Panesar)	Longlisted	
2021	Serial Drama Performance	Danny Dyer (Mick Carter)	Shortlisted	
2021	Serial Drama Performance	Shona McGarty (Whitney Dean)	Longlisted	
2021	Serial Drama Performance	Balvinder Sopal (Suki Panesar)	Longlisted	
2022	Serial Drama	EastEnders	Nominated	
2022	Serial Drama Performance	Zaraah Abrahams (Chelsea Fox)	Longlisted	
2022	Serial Drama Performance	Rose Ayling-Ellis (Frankie Lewis)	Shortlisted	
2022	Serial Drama Performance	Kellie Bright (Linda Carter)	Longlisted	
2022	Serial Drama Performance	Max Bowden (Ben Mitchell)	Longlisted	
2022	Serial Drama Performance	Danny Dyer (Mick Carter)	Longlisted	
2022	Serial Drama Performance	Gillian Wright (Jean Slater)	Shortlisted	
2023	Rising Star	Bobby Brazier (Freddie Slater)	Won	
2023	Serial Drama	EastEnders	Won	
2023	Serial Drama Performance	James Farrar (Zack Hudson)	Longlisted	
2023	Serial Drama Performance	Danielle Harold (Lola Pearce-Brown)	Won	
2023	Serial Drama Performance	Diane Parish (Denise Fox)	Longlisted	
2023	Serial Drama Performance	Balvinder Sopal (Suki Panesar)	Longlisted	
2023	Serial Drama Performance	Aaron Thiara (Ravi Gulati)	Longlisted	
2023	Serial Drama Performance	Lillia Turner (Lily Slater)	Longlisted	
2024
2024	Serial Drama	EastEnders	Nominated	
2024	Serial Drama Performance	Michelle Collins (Cindy Beale)	Longlisted	
2024	Serial Drama Performance	Jaden Ladega (Denzel Danes)	Longlisted	
2024	Serial Drama Performance	Diane Parish (Denise Fox)	Shortlisted	
2024	Serial Drama Performance	Colin Salmon (George Knight)	Longlisted	
2024	Serial Drama Performance	Rudolph Walker (Patrick Trueman)	Longlisted	
2024	Serial Drama Performance	Angela Wynter (Yolande Trueman)	Shortlisted	

== Radio Times Soap Awards ==
In response to the cancellation of the British Soap Awards due to the COVID-19 pandemic, Radio Times launched its own soap awards in May of this year. It consisted of just five categories, all of which were decided by public poll and awarded online as in-person ceremonies were largely prohibited.

The inaugural RadioTimes Soap Awards were launched in 2024, despite having been previously awarded in 2020, also in response to the cancellation of that year's British Soap Awards.

Year	Category	Nominee(s)	Result	Ref
2020	Best Soap	EastEnders	Nominated	
2020	Best Actor	Max Bowden (Ben Mitchell)	Nominated	
2020	Best Actress	Letitia Dean (Sharon Watts)	Nominated	
2020	Best Newcomer	Milly Zero (Dotty Cotton)	Nominated	
2020	Best Storyline	Boat disaster	Nominated	
2021	Best Soap	EastEnders	Nominated	
2024	Best Soap	Eastenders	Won	
2024	Best Actor	Balvinder Sopal (Suki Panesar)	Nominated	
2024	Best Actor	Angela Wynter (Yolande Trueman)	Won	
2024	Best Actor	Colin Salmon (George Knight)	Nominated	
2024	Best Villain	Navin Chowdhry (Nish Panesar)	Won	
2024	Best Villain	Matt Di Angelo (Dean Wicks)	Nominated	
2024	Best Newcomer	Francesca Henry (Gina Knight)	Nominated	
2024	Best Comedy Performance	Jonny Freeman (Reiss Colwell)	Nominated	
2024	Best Exit	Danny Walters (Keanu Taylor)	Won	
2024	Best Exit	Elizabeth Counsell (Gloria Knight)	Nominated	
2024	Soap Moment of the Year	Sixmas	Won	
2024	Best Twist	Return of Cindy Beale	Nominated	
2024	Best Twist	Keanu Taylor's Christmas Day death	Nominated	
2024	Best Episode	Christmas Day	Nominated	
2024	Best Episode	George confronts Eddie	Won	
2024	Best Storyline	The Six	Nominated	
2024	Best Storyline	Return of Cindy Beale	Nominated	

== Royal Television Society Awards ==
=== RTS Programme Awards ===
The Royal Television Society Programme Awards ceremony takes place every March in central London. EastEnders has been nominated in the Soap category (Soap and Continual Drama from 2007 onwards) 11 times, and has won five times, in 2002, 2009, 2010, 2011 and 2024. In 2009, episodes were submitted to a panel from "Whitney Week", a week of episodes centred around the character of Whitney Dean, played by Shona McGarty. In 2011, Lindsay Coulson's portrayal of Carol Jackson was praised by the judges, following the death of her son Billie Jackson (Devon Anderson). Actress Patsy Palmer was also nominated in the Actor Female category in 1998 for her portrayal of Bianca Jackson.

Year	Category	Nominee(s)	Result	Ref(s)
1998	Actor Female	Patsy Palmer (Bianca Jackson)	Nominated	
2002	Soap	EastEnders	Won	
2004	Soap	EastEnders	Nominated	
2005	Soap	EastEnders	Nominated	
2006	Soap	EastEnders	Nominated	
2009	Soap and Continuing Drama	EastEnders	Won	
2010	Soap and Continuing Drama	EastEnders	Won	
2011	Soap and Continuing Drama	EastEnders	Won	
2012	Soap and Continuing Drama	EastEnders	Nominated	
2013	Soap and Continuing Drama	EastEnders	Nominated	
2015	Soap and Continuing Drama	EastEnders	Nominated	
2016	Soap and Continuing Drama	EastEnders	Nominated	
2017	Soap and Continuing Drama	EastEnders	Nominated	
2018	Soap and Continuing Drama	EastEnders	Nominated	
2020	Soap and Continuing Drama	EastEnders	Nominated	
2023	Soap and Continuing Drama	EastEnders	Nominated	
2024	Soap and Continuing Drama	EastEnders	Won	

=== RTS Craft & Design Awards ===
The Royal Television Society Craft & Design Awards are presented by the Royal Television Society to recognize technical achievements in British television. EastEnders has received four nominations winning one, which have included two nominations for the live episode in 2005.

Year	Category	Nominee(s)	Result	Ref(s)
2001	Lighting, Photography & Camera - Lighting for Multicamera	Roger Francis	Nominated	
2001	Lighting, Photography & Camera - Multicamera Work	John Corby	Nominated	
2005	Lighting and Multi Camera - Lighting for Multi Camera	John Carberry	Nominated	
2005	Lighting and Multi Camera - Multi Camera Work	Clive Arnold, Duncan Unsworth	Won	

== Screen Nation Awards ==
The Screen Nation Film and Television Awards were an annual award ceremony devised to celebrate and award Black British and international film and television talent. In February 2009, actress Tiana Benjamin, who played Chelsea Fox, was voted Favourite Female TV Star. In 2011, EastEnders stars received five Screen Nation nominations, with Ellen Thomas (Grace Olubunmi) and Sharon Duncan-Brewster (Trina Johnson) receiving special mentions, and EastEnders itself received one nomination. In 2012, EastEnders and EastEnders: E20 stars received four nominations, with actress Modupe Adeyeye receiving a special mention.

Year	Category	Nominee(s)	Result	Ref(s)
2007	Diversity in Drama Production	EastEnders	Nominated	
2009	Favourite Female TV Star	Tiana Benjamin (Chelsea Fox)	Won	
2009	Young Shooting Star	Belinda Owusu (Libby Fox)	Nominated	
2011	Diversity in Drama Production	EastEnders	Nominated	
2011	Emerging Talent	Devon Anderson (Billie Jackson)	Nominated	
2011	Emerging Talent	Arinze Kene (Connor Stanley)	Nominated	
2011	Favourite Female TV Star	Sharon Duncan-Brewster (Trina Johnson)	Mentioned	
2011	Favourite Female TV Star	Tameka Empson (Kim Fox)	Won	
2011	Favourite Female TV Star	Ellen Thomas (Grace Olubunmi)	Mentioned	
2011	Favourite Male TV Star	Arinze Kene (Connor Stanley)	Won	
2011	Young Shooting Star (16-23)	Bunmi Mojekwu (Mercy Olubunmi)	Nominated	
2012	Emerging Talent	Samuell Benta (Donnie Lester, EastEnders: E20)	Nominated	
2012	Favourite Female TV Star	Tameka Empson (Kim Fox)	Won	
2012	Favourite Male TV Star	Chucky Venn (Ray Dixon)	Won	
2012	Young Shooting Star (16-25)	Ricky Norwood (Fatboy)	Nominated	
2012	Young Shooting Star (16-25)	Modupe Adeyeye (Faith Olubunmi)	Mentioned	
2015	Favourite Female TV Star	Rebecca Scroggs (Tosh Mackintosh)	Nominated	
2016	Favourite Male TV Personality	Richard Blackwood (Vincent Hubbard)	Nominated	
2017	Female Performance in TV	Diane Parish (Denise Fox)	Nominated	
2017	Female Performance in TV	Ellen Thomas (Claudette Hubbard)	Mentioned	
2017	Male Performance in TV	Joivan Wade (Jordan Johnson)	Mentioned	
2019	Emerging Talent	Zack Morris (Keegan Baker)	Nominated	
2020	Female Performance in TV	Suzette Llewellyn (Sheree Trueman)	Mentioned	

== Smash Hits T4 Poll Winners Party ==
The Smash Hits T4 Poll Winners Party was an awards ceremony which ran from 1979 to 1987 as the Smash Hits Readers' Poll, then on television from 1988 to 2005.

Year	Category	Nominee(s)	Result	Ref(s)
1986	Best Non-music TV	EastEnders	Won	
1987	Best Non-music TV	EastEnders	Won	
1988	Worst TV Programme	EastEnders	Won	
1996	Best TV Show	EastEnders	Won	
1997	Best TV Actress	Martine McCutcheon	Won	
1998	Best TV Show	Eastenders	Won	
1998	Best TV Actress	Martine McCutcheon	Won	
2001	Best TV Show	EastEnders	Won	
2002	Best TV Show	EastEnders	Won	
2004	Best TV Show	EastEnders	Won	
2005	Best TV Show	EastEnders	Won	

== TRIC Awards ==
The Television and Radio Industries Club (TRIC) Awards were established in 1969. They are awarded annually and are voted for by members of the television and radio industry. EastEnders has won a total of 18 awards, including Best TV Theme Music in 1987 (awarded to Simon May), TV Soap Personality in 2007, 2011 and 2013 (awarded to Lacey Turner, Jessie Wallace and Shane Richie respectively), New TV Talent in 2004 (Christopher Parker), numerous wins for TV Soap of the Year and the TRIC Special Award in 2010 and 2017, presented to Barbara Windsor and June Brown, respectively.

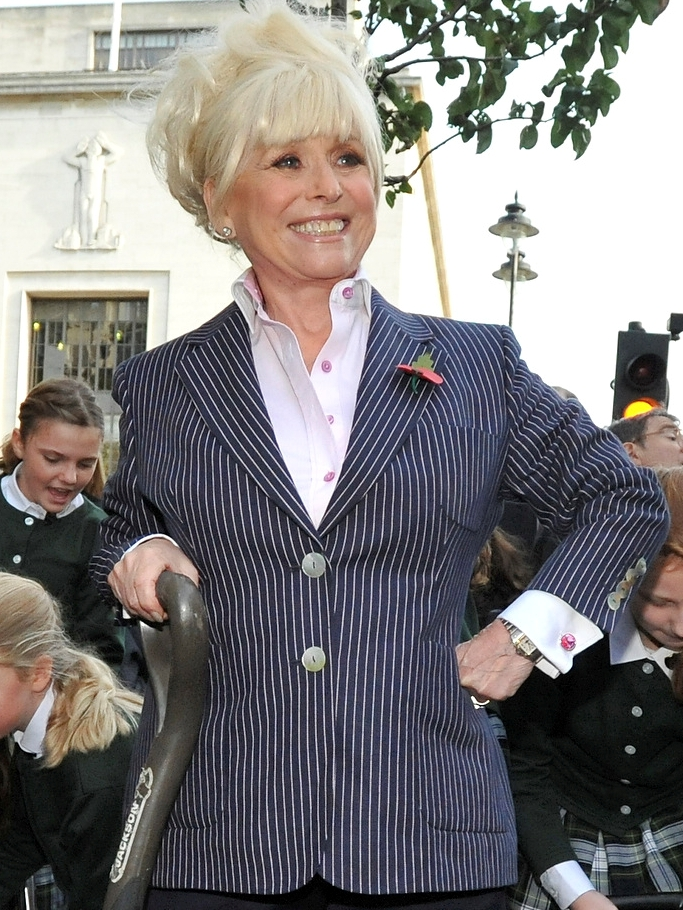
Barbara Windsor (Peggy Mitchell) became EastEnders' first recipient of the TRIC Special Award in 2010.

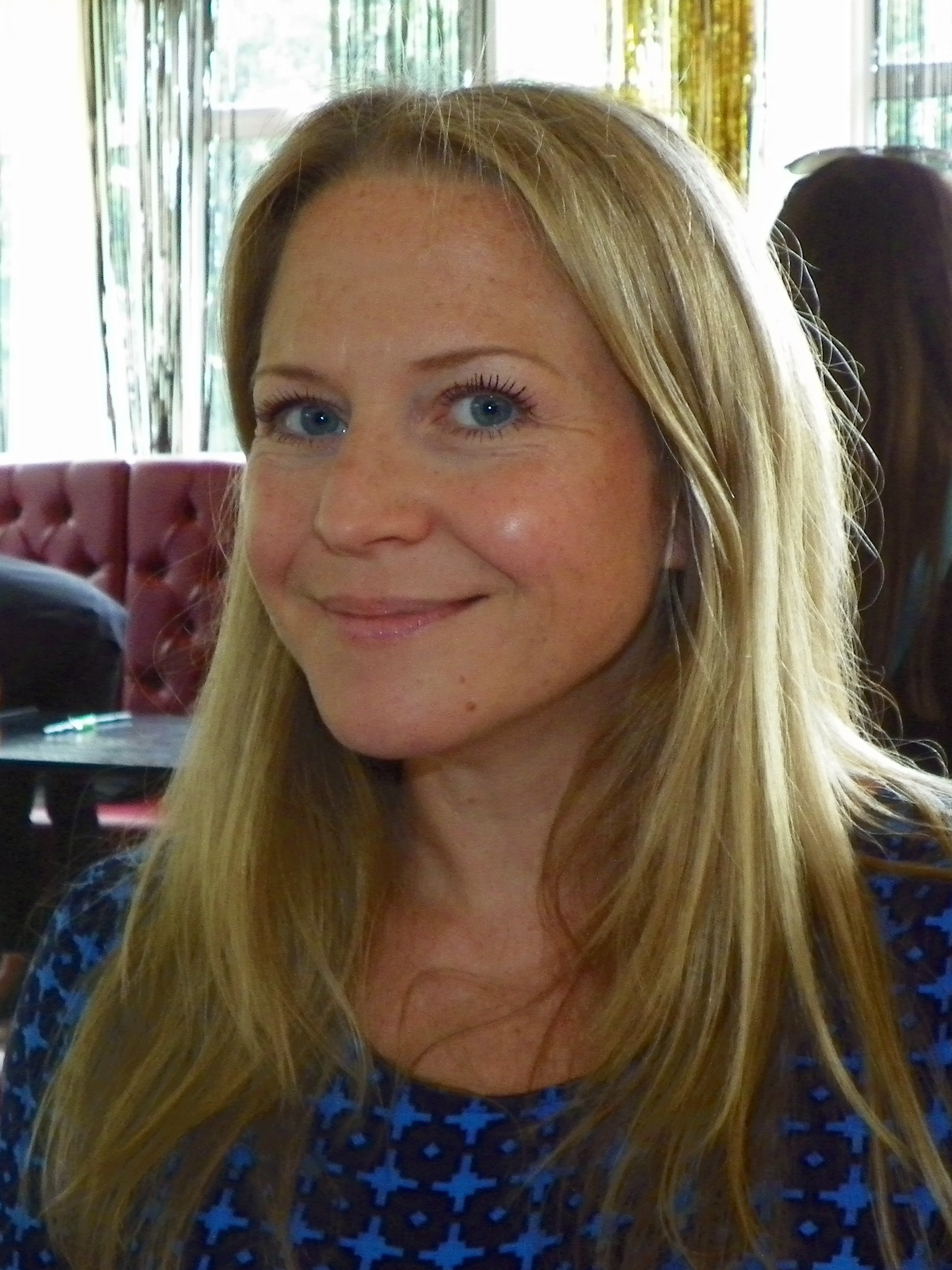
Kellie Bright (Linda Carter) won the Soap Actor accolade in 2020.

Year	Category	Nominee(s)	Result	Ref(s)
1986	BBC Programme of the Year	EastEnders	Won	
1987	Best Theme Music	Simon May	Won	
2001	TV Soap of the Year	EastEnders	Nominated	
2002	TV Soap Programme of the Year	EastEnders	Won	
2003	TV Soap of the Year	EastEnders	Nominated	
2004	TV Soap of the Year	EastEnders	Nominated	
2004	New TV Talent	Christopher Parker (Spencer Moon)	Won	
2007	TV Soap of the Year	EastEnders	Nominated	
2007	TV Soap Personality	Lacey Turner (Stacey Slater)	Won	
2008	TV Soap of the Year	EastEnders	Won	
2009	TV Soap of the Year	EastEnders	Won	
2009	TV Soap Personality	Patsy Palmer (Bianca Jackson)	Nominated	
2010	TRIC Special Award	Barbara Windsor (Peggy Mitchell)	Won	
2010	TV Soap of the Year	EastEnders	Won	
2010	TV Soap Personality	Lacey Turner (Stacey Slater)	Nominated	
2011	TV Soap of the Year	EastEnders	Nominated	
2011	TV Soap Personality	Jessie Wallace (Kat Moon)	Won	
2012	TV Soap of the Year	EastEnders	Won	
2012	TV Soap Personality	Jo Joyner (Tanya Jessop)	Nominated	
2013	Soap Personality	Shane Richie (Alfie Moon)	Won	
2013	TV Soap of the Year	EastEnders	Nominated	
2014	TV Soap of the Year	EastEnders	Nominated	
2015	TV Soap of the Year	EastEnders	Nominated	
2015	Soap Personality	Danny Dyer (Mick Carter)	Won	
2017	Soap Personality	June Brown (Dot Branning)	Nominated	
2017	TRIC Special Award	June Brown (Dot Branning)	Won	
2017	TV Soap of the Year	EastEnders	Won	
2018	TV Soap of the Year	EastEnders	Nominated	
2019	Soap Actor	Danny Dyer (Mick Carter)	Won	
2019	TV Soap of the Year	EastEnders	Nominated	
2020	Soap Actor	Kellie Bright (Linda Carter)	Won	
2020	TV Soap of the Year	EastEnders	Nominated	
2021	Soap Actor	Danny Dyer (Mick Carter)	Nominated	
2021	Soap of the Year	EastEnders	Nominated	
2022	Soap of the Year	EastEnders	Nominated	
2023	Soap Actor	Jamie Borthwick (Jay Brown)	Nominated	
2023	Soap Actor	Danielle Harold (Lola Pearce-Brown)	Won	
2023	Soap of the Year	EastEnders	Nominated	

== TV Choice Awards ==
The TV Choice Awards, awarded by TV Choice magazine, began in 1997 as the TV Quick Awards. Between 2005 and 2009 they were known as the TV Quick and TV Choice Awards. They are voted for by readers of the magazine.

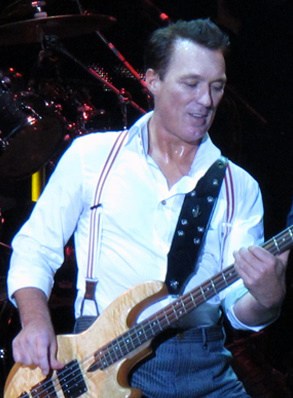
Martin Kemp (Steve Owen) won Best Soap Actor for three years running at the TV Quick Awards, in 2000, 2001 and 2002.

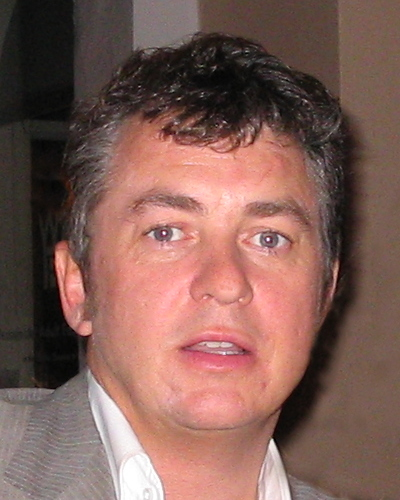
Shane Richie (Alfie Moon) won the award for Best Soap Actor five times; in 2003 and 2004, and for three consecutive years in 2011, 2012 and 2013.

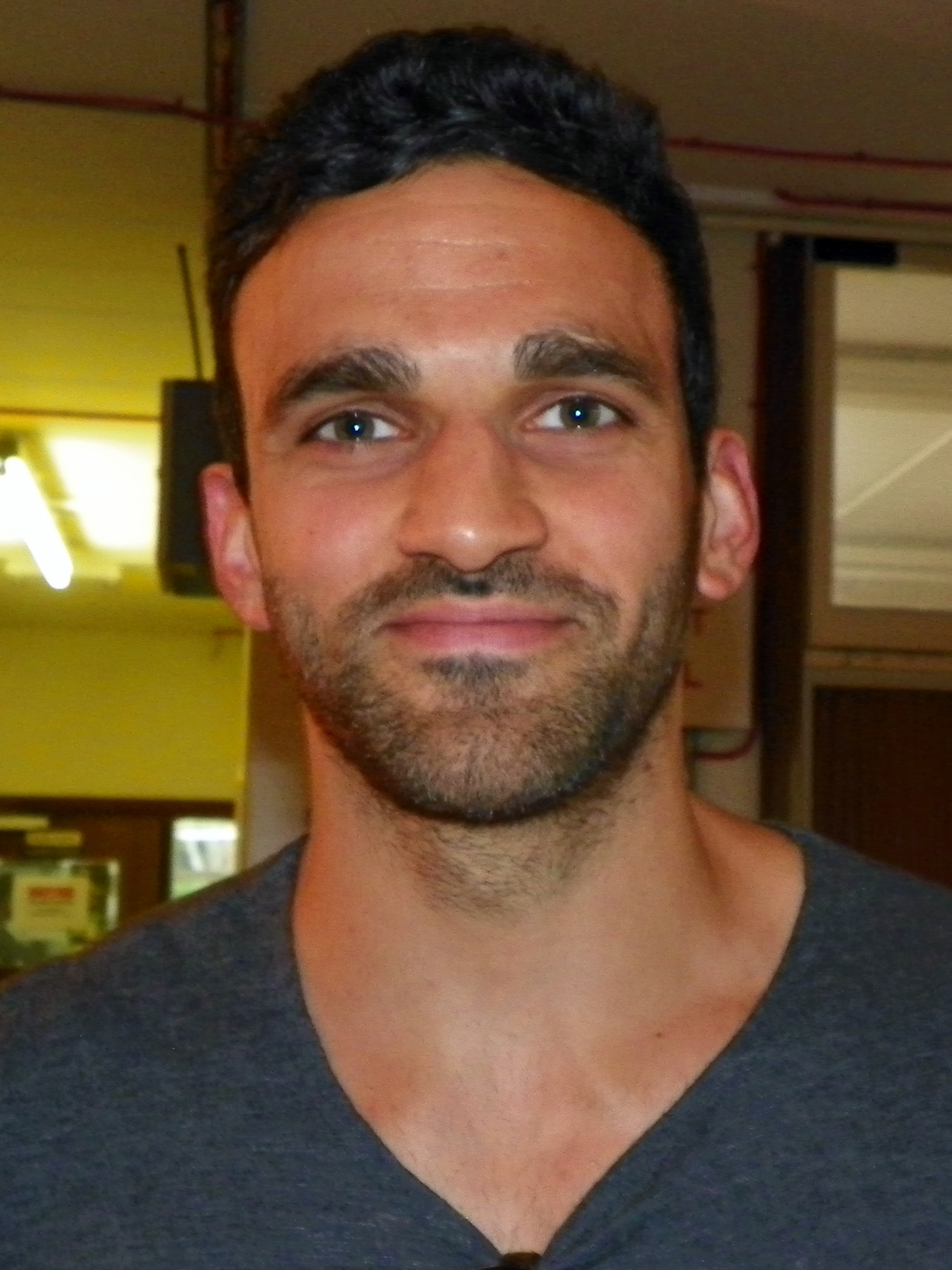
Davood Ghadami (Kush Kazemi) won Best Soap Newcomer in 2015.

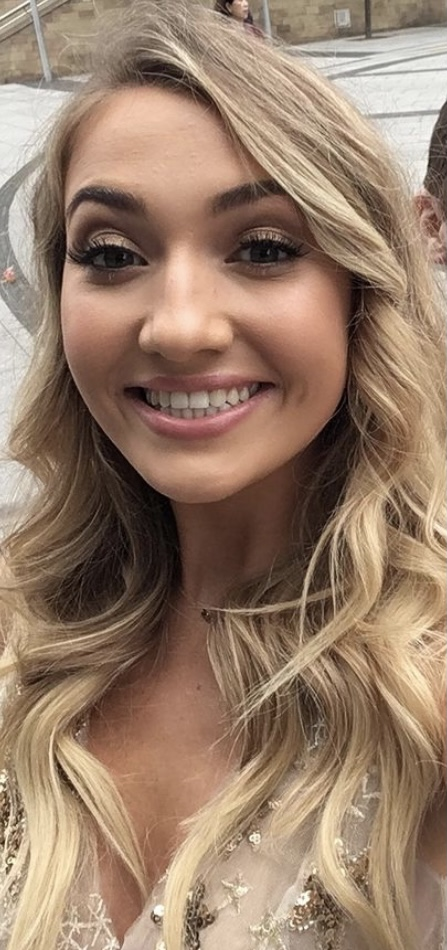
Tilly Keeper (Tilly Keeper) was nominated for Best Soap Newcomer in 2016.

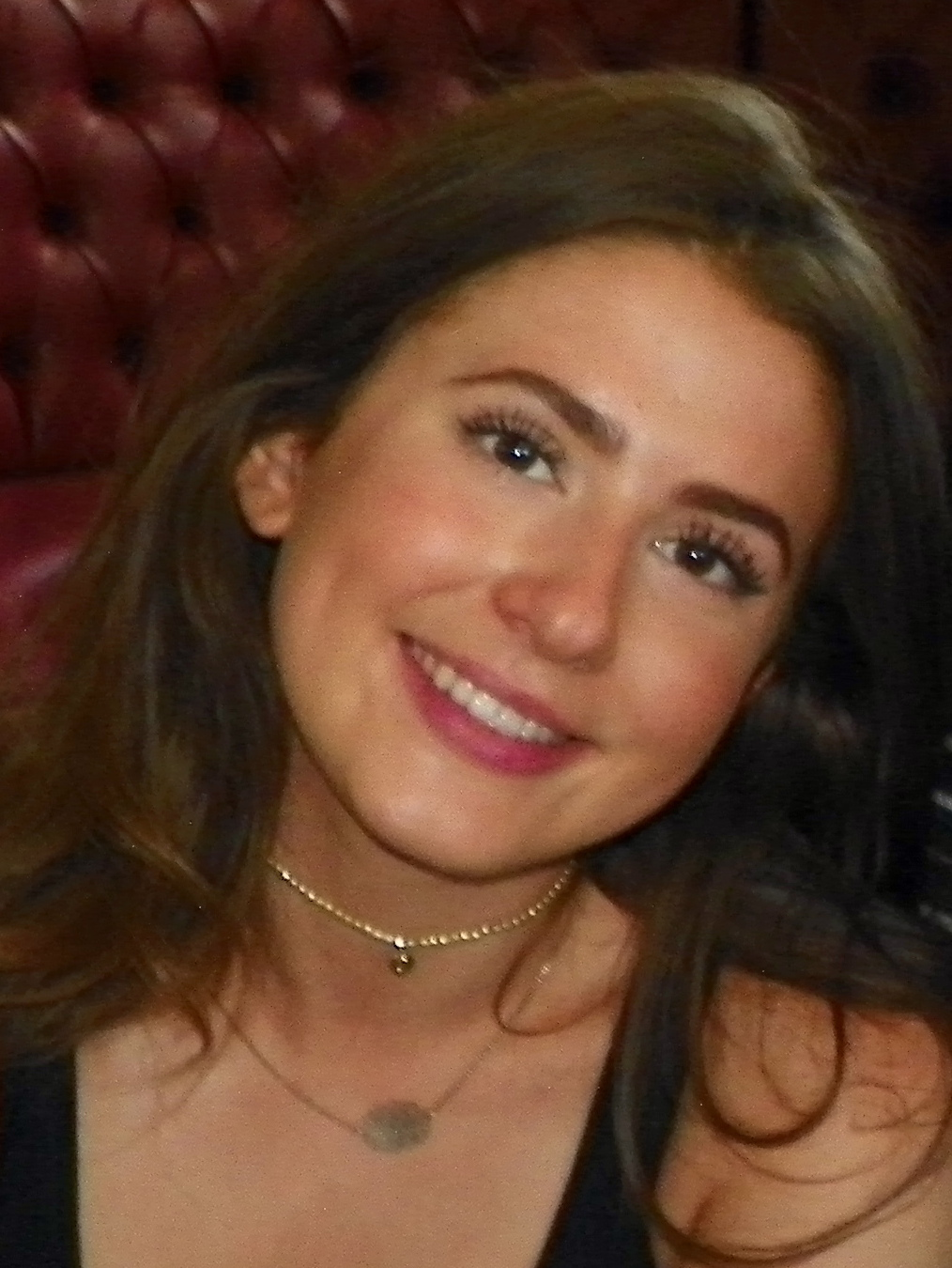
Jasmine Armfield (Bex Fowler) was nominated for Best Soap Actress in 2017.

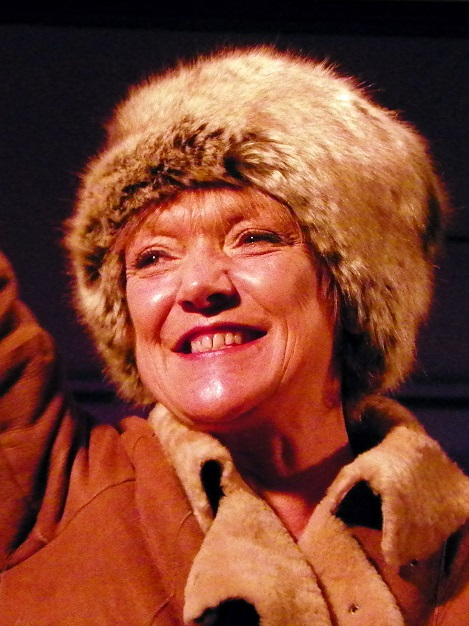
Gillian Wright (Jean Slater) won Best Soap Actress in 2022.

Year	Category	Nominee(s)	Result	Ref(s)
1998	Best Actor	Ross Kemp (Grant Mitchell)	Won	
1998	Best Actress	Martine McCutcheon (Tiffany Mitchell)	Won	
1998	Best Soap	EastEnders	Won	
1999	Best Newcomer	Jack Ryder (Jamie Mitchell)	Won	
1999	Best Soap	EastEnders	Won	
1999	Best Soap Actor	Joe Absolom (Matthew Rose)	Won	
1999	Best Soap Storyline	EastEnders (death of Saskia Duncan)	Won	
2000	Best Soap	EastEnders	Nominated	
2000	Best Soap Actor	Martin Kemp (Steve Owen)	Won	
2001	Best Soap	EastEnders	Won	
2001	Best Soap Actor	Martin Kemp (Steve Owen)	Won	
2001	Best Soap Actress	Natalie Cassidy (Sonia Jackson)	Won	
2001	Best Soap Newcomer	Jessie Wallace (Kat Slater)	Won	
2001	Best Soap Storyline	EastEnders	Won	
2002	Best Soap	EastEnders	Won	
2002	Best Soap Actor	Martin Kemp (Steve Owen)	Won	
2002	Best Soap Actress	Kacey Ainsworth (Little Mo Mitchell)	Won	
2002	Best Soap Newcomer	Alex Ferns (Trevor Morgan)	Won	
2002	Best Soap Storyline	EastEnders Trevor Morgan's abuse of wife Little Mo	Won	
2003	Best Soap	EastEnders	Won	
2003	Best Soap Actress	Jessie Wallace (Kat Slater)	Won	
2003	Best Soap Newcomer	Shane Richie (Alfie Moon)	Won	
2004	Best Soap	EastEnders	Nominated	
2004	Best Soap Actor	Shane Richie (Alfie Moon)	Won	
2005	Best Soap	EastEnders	Nominated	
2005	Best Soap Actor	Shane Richie (Alfie Moon)	Won	
2005	Best Soap Newcomer	Lacey Turner (Stacey Slater)	Won	
2006	Best Soap	EastEnders	Won	
2006	Best Soap Actor	Ross Kemp (Grant Mitchell)	Nominated	
2006	Best Soap Actress	Lacey Turner (Stacey Slater)	Nominated	
2006	Best Soap Newcomer	Emma Barton (Honey Edwards)	Nominated	
2006	Best Soap Newcomer	Charlie Clements (Bradley Branning)	Won	
2006	Best Soap Storyline	Digging up Den/Mitchell boys' return	Nominated	
2006	Best Soap Storyline	Nana's wishes/Kat and Alfie's exit	Nominated	
2007	Best Soap	EastEnders	Nominated	
2007	Best Soap Actor	Charlie Clements (Bradley Branning)	Won	
2007	Best Soap Actor	Steve McFadden (Phil Mitchell)	Nominated	
2007	Best Soap Actress	June Brown (Dot Branning)	Nominated	
2007	Best Soap Actress	Lacey Turner (Stacey Slater)	Nominated	
2007	Best Newcomer	Jo Joyner (Tanya Branning)	Nominated	
2007	Best Newcomer	Jake Wood (Max Branning)	Nominated	
2007	Best Soap Storyline	Max, Stacey, Bradley and Tanya love tangle	Nominated	
2007	Best Soap Storyline	Pauline Fowler's death and aftermath	Nominated	
2007	Best Soap Storyline	Stella Crawford's torment of Ben Mitchell	Nominated	
2008	Best Soap	EastEnders	Won	
2008	Best Soap Actor	Charlie Clements (Bradley Branning)	Won	
2008	Best Soap Actor	Jake Wood (Max Branning)	Nominated	
2008	Best Soap Actress	Jo Joyner (Tanya Branning)	Nominated	
2008	Best Soap Actress	Lacey Turner (Stacey Slater)	Nominated	
2008	Best Newcomer	Cheryl Fergison (Heather Trott)	Nominated	
2008	Best Newcomer	John Partridge (Christian Clarke)	Nominated	
2008	Best Newcomer	Rita Simons (Roxy Mitchell)	Nominated	
2008	Best Soap Storyline	Aftermath of Max and Stacey's affair	Nominated	
2009	Best Soap	EastEnders	Won	
2009	Best Soap Actor	Larry Lamb (Archie Mitchell)	Longlisted	
2009	Best Soap Actor	Scott Maslen (Jack Branning)	Shortlisted	
2009	Best Soap Actor	Steve McFadden (Phil Mitchell)	Shortlisted	
2009	Best Soap Actress	Samantha Janus (Ronnie Mitchell)	Shortlisted	
2009	Best Soap Actress	Linda Henry (Shirley Carter)	Shortlisted	
2009	Best Soap Actress	Barbara Windsor (Peggy Mitchell)	Longlisted	
2009	Best Soap Newcomer	Lauren Crace (Danielle Jones)	Won	
2009	Best Soap Newcomer	Marc Elliott (Syed Masood)	Longlisted	
2009	Best Soap Newcomer	Preeya Kalidas (Amira Shah)	Longlisted	
2009	Best Soap Storyline	Danielle and Ronnie	Won	
2009	Best Soap Storyline	Whitney and Tony	Shortlisted	
2009	Best Soap Storyline	Patrick Trueman facing up to his past	Longlisted	
2010	Best Soap	EastEnders	Won	
2010	Best Soap Actor	Don Gilet (Lucas Johnson)	Longlisted	
2010	Best Soap Actor	Scott Maslen (Jack Branning)	Shortlisted	
2010	Best Soap Actor	Jake Wood (Max Branning)	Shortlisted	
2010	Best Soap Actress	Diane Parish (Denise Johnson)	Longlisted	
2010	Best Soap Actress	Lacey Turner (Stacey Slater)	Won	
2010	Best Soap Actress	Nina Wadia (Zainab Masood)	Shortlisted	
2010	Best Soap Newcomer	Sam Attwater (Leon Small)	Longlisted	
2010	Best Soap Newcomer	Emer Kenny (Zsa Zsa Carter)	Shortlisted	
2010	Best Soap Newcomer	Ricky Norwood (Fatboy)	Shortlisted	
2010	Best Soap Storyline	Christian Clarke and Syed Masood's relationship	Shortlisted	
2010	Best Soap Storyline	Lucas Johnson's reign of terror	Longlisted	
2010	Best Soap Storyline	Who Killed Archie?	Shortlisted	
2011	Best Soap	EastEnders	Won	
2011	Best Soap Actor	Nitin Ganatra (Masood Ahmed)	Longlisted	
2011	Best Soap Actor	Steve McFadden (Phil Mitchell)	Longlisted	
2011	Best Soap Actor	Shane Richie (Alfie Moon)	Won	
2011	Best Soap Actress	Lindsey Coulson (Carol Jackson)	Longlisted	
2011	Best Soap Actress	Nina Wadia (Zainab Masood)	Longlisted	
2011	Best Soap Actress	Jessie Wallace (Kat Moon)	Won	
2011	Best Soap Newcomer	Ace Bhatti (Yusef Khan)	Longlisted	
2011	Best Soap Newcomer	Jacqueline Jossa (Lauren Branning)	Shortlisted	
2011	Best Soap Newcomer	Steve John Shepherd (Michael Moon)	Shortlisted	
2011	Best Soap Storyline	Ronnie swaps her baby for Kat's	Shortlisted	
2011	Best Soap Storyline	Yusef tries to destroy the Masoods	Longlisted	
2011	Best Soap Storyline	Whitney is exploited at the hands of Rob	Longlisted	
2012	Best Soap	EastEnders	Won	
2012	Best Soap Actor	Nitin Ganatra (Masood Ahmed)	Longlisted	
2012	Best Soap Actor	Steve McFadden (Phil Mitchell)	Longlisted	
2012	Best Soap Actor	Shane Richie (Alfie Moon)	Won	
2012	Best Soap Actress	Charlie Brooks (Janine Butcher)	Shortlisted	
2012	Best Soap Actress	Lindsey Coulson (Carol Jackson)	Longlisted	
2012	Best Soap Actress	Jo Joyner (Tanya Branning)	Shortlisted	
2012	Best Soap Newcomer	Tony Discipline (Tyler Moon)	Won	
2012	Best Soap Newcomer	Jamie Foreman (Derek Branning)	Shortlisted	
2012	Best Soap Newcomer	Chucky Venn (Ray Dixon)	Longlisted	
2013	Best Soap	EastEnders	Nominated	
2013	Best Soap Actor	Perry Fenwick (Billy Mitchell)	Longlisted	
2013	Best Soap Actor	Nitin Ganatra (Masood Ahmed)	Longlisted	
2013	Best Soap Actor	Shane Richie (Alfie Moon)	Won	
2013	Best Soap Actress	Charlie Brooks (Janine Butcher)	Shortlisted	
2013	Best Soap Actress	Diane Parish (Denise Fox)	Longlisted	
2013	Best Soap Actress	Gillian Wright (Jean Slater)	Shortlisted	
2013	Best Soap Newcomer	Khali Best (Dexter Hartman)	Longlisted	
2013	Best Soap Newcomer	Clare Perkins (Ava Hartman)	Longlisted	
2013	Best Soap Newcomer	David Witts (Joey Branning)	Won	
2014	Best Soap	EastEnders	Won	
2014	Best Soap Actor	Danny Dyer (Mick Carter)	Won	
2014	Best Soap Actor	Ben Hardy (Peter Beale)	Longlisted	
2014	Best Soap Actor	Adam Woodyatt (Ian Beale)	Shortlisted	
2014	Best Soap Actress	Kellie Bright (Linda Carter)	Longlisted	
2014	Best Soap Actress	Lindsey Coulson (Carol Jackson)	Won	
2014	Best Soap Actress	Diane Parish (Denise Fox)	Longlisted	
2014	Best Soap Newcomer	Maddy Hill (Nancy Carter)	Shortlisted	
2014	Best Soap Newcomer	Sam Strike (Johnny Carter)	Shortlisted	
2014	Best Soap Newcomer	Rakhee Thakrar (Shabnam Masood)	Longlisted	
2014	Best Soap Storyline	Who Killed Lucy Beale?	Shortlisted	
2014	Best Soap Storyline	Carol Jackson's breast cancer	Longlisted	
2014	Best Soap Storyline	Johnny Carter comes out	Longlisted	
2014	Outstanding Contribution	EastEnders	Won	
2015	Best Soap	EastEnders	Won	
2015	Best Soap Actor	Danny Dyer (Mick Carter)	Shortlisted	
2015	Best Soap Actor	Steve McFadden (Phil Mitchell)	Longlisted	
2015	Best Soap Actor	Adam Woodyatt (Ian Beale)	Shortlisted	
2015	Best Soap Actress	Laurie Brett (Jane Beale)	Longlisted	
2015	Best Soap Actress	Kellie Bright (Linda Carter)	Shortlisted	
2015	Best Soap Actress	Tameka Empson (Kim Fox)	Longlisted	
2015	Best Soap Newcomer	Richard Blackwood (Vincent Hubbard)	Longlisted	
2015	Best Soap Newcomer	Davood Ghadami (Kush Kazemi)	Won	
2015	Best Soap Newcomer	Harry Reid (Ben Mitchell)	Longlisted	
2016	Best Soap	EastEnders	Nominated	
2016	Best Soap Actor	James Bye (Martin Fowler)	Longlisted	
2016	Best Soap Actor	Danny Dyer (Mick Carter)	Shortlisted	
2016	Best Soap Actor	Steve McFadden (Phil Mitchell)	Shortlisted	
2016	Best Soap Actress	Letitia Dean (Sharon Mitchell)	Longlisted	
2016	Best Soap Actress	Diane Parish (Denise Fox)	Longlisted	
2016	Best Soap Actress	Lacey Turner (Stacey Fowler)	Won	
2016	Best Soap Newcomer	Tilly Keeper (Louise Mitchell)	Longlisted	
2016	Best Soap Newcomer	Riley Carter Millington (Kyle Slater)	Shortlisted	
2017	Best Soap	EastEnders	Nominated	
2017	Best Soap Actor	Danny Dyer (Mick Carter)	Shortlisted	
2017	Best Soap Actor	Davood Ghadami (Kush Kazemi)	Longlisted	
2017	Best Soap Actor	Jake Wood (Max Branning)	Longlisted	
2017	Best Soap Actress	Jasmine Armfield (Bex Fowler)	Shortlisted	
2017	Best Soap Actress	Shona McGarty (Whitney Carter)	Longlisted	
2017	Best Soap Actress	Diane Parish (Denise Fox)	Longlisted	
2017	Best Soap Newcomer	Zack Morris (Keegan Baker)	Shortlisted	
2018	Best Soap	EastEnders	Nominated	
2018	Best Soap Actor	Danny Dyer (Mick Carter)	Won	
2018	Best Soap Actress	Lacey Turner (Stacey Fowler)	Nominated	
2018	Best Soap Newcomer	Katie Jarvis (Hayley Slater)	Nominated	
2019	Best Soap	EastEnders	Nominated	
2019	Best Soap Actor	Danny Dyer (Mick Carter)	Won	
2019	Best Soap Actress	Gillian Wright (Jean Slater)	Nominated	
2019	Best Soap Actress	Lorraine Stanley (Karen Taylor)	Nominated	
2019	Best Soap Newcomer	Kara-Leah Fernandes (Bailey Baker)	Won	
2020	Best Soap	EastEnders	Nominated	
2020	Best Soap Actor	Max Bowden (Ben Mitchell)	Nominated	
2020	Best Soap Actor	Danny Dyer (Mick Carter)	Nominated	
2020	Best Soap Actor	Zack Morris (Keegan Baker)	Longlisted	
2020	Best Soap Actress	Kellie Bright (Linda Carter)	Nominated	
2020	Best Soap Actress	Shona McGarty (Whitney Dean)	Nominated	
2020	Best Soap Actress	Jessica Plummer (Chantelle Atkins)	Longlisted	
2021	Best Soap	EastEnders	Nominated	
2021	Best Soap Actor	Danny Dyer (Mick Carter)	Nominated	
2021	Best Soap Actress	Kellie Bright (Linda Carter)	Nominated	
2022	Best Soap	EastEnders	Nominated	
2022	Best Soap Actor	Max Bowden (Ben Mitchell)	Nominated	
2022	Best Soap Actor	Danny Dyer (Mick Carter)	Nominated	
2022	Best Soap Actress	Kellie Bright (Linda Carter)	Nominated	
2022	Best Soap Actress	Gillian Wright (Jean Slater)	Won	
2024	Best Soap	Eastenders	Nominated	
2024	Best Soap Actor	Jamie Borthwick (Jay Brown)	Nominated	
2024	Best Soap Actress	Danielle Harold (Lola Pearce)	Nominated	

== TV Now Awards ==
The TV Now Awards were awarded annually by Irish magazine TV Now between 2006 and 2010. In 2007, actor Steve McFadden won in the Male Soap Star category and Lacey Turner won the Hot Young Talent award. In 2009, Barbara Windsor won the Soap Legend Award for her portrayal of Peggy Mitchell.

Year	Category	Nominee(s)	Result	Ref(s)
2007	Favourite Soap	EastEnders	Nominated	
2007	Favourite Male Soap Star	Steve McFadden (Phil Mitchell)	Won	
2007	Hot Young Talent	Lacey Turner (Stacey Slater)	Won	
2008	Best Soap	EastEnders	Nominated	
2008	Favourite Male Soap Star	Charlie Clements (Bradley Branning)	Nominated	
2008	Favourite Male Soap Star	Steve McFadden (Phil Mitchell)	Nominated	
2008	Favourite Female Soap Star	Lacey Turner (Stacey Slater)	Nominated	
2008	Favourite Female Soap Star	Barbara Windsor (Peggy Mitchell)	Nominated	
2008	Favourite Newcomer	Rita Simons and Samantha Janus (Roxy and Ronnie Mitchell)	Nominated	
2008	Favourite Soap Couple	Laurie Brett and Adam Woodyatt (Jane and Ian Beale)	Nominated	
2009	Favourite Soap	EastEnders	Nominated	
2009	Favourite Male Soap Star	Scott Maslen (Jack Branning)	Nominated	
2009	Favourite Male Soap Star	Jake Wood (Max Branning)	Nominated	
2009	Favourite Female Soap Star	Jo Joyner (Tanya Branning)	Nominated	
2009	Favourite Female Soap Star	Rita Simons (Roxy Mitchell)	Nominated	
2009	Favourite Soap Couple	Laurie Brett and Adam Woodyatt (Jane and Ian Beale)	Nominated	
2009	Soap Legend Award	Barbara Windsor (Peggy Mitchell)	Won	
2010	Favourite Soap	EastEnders	Nominated	
2010	Favourite Male Soap Star	Scott Maslen (Jack Branning)	Nominated	
2010	Favourite Male Soap Star	Steve McFadden (Phil Mitchell)	Nominated	
2010	Favourite Female Soap Star	June Brown (Dot Branning)	Nominated	
2010	Favourite Female Soap Star	Patsy Palmer (Bianca Jackson)	Nominated	
2010	Favourite Female Soap Star	Lacey Turner (Stacey Slater)	Nominated	
2010	Favourite Soap Family	Branning family	Nominated	
2010	Favourite Soap Family	Mitchell family	Nominated	

== TV Times Awards ==
In the TV Times Awards, which began in 1969 and are awarded by TV Times magazine, actress Lacey Turner (Stacey Slater) won Favourite Soap Star in 2008 and 2009. EastEnders received a further three nominations in 2009 including Favourite Soap Star for Barbara Windsor (Peggy Mitchell). Turner won and Windsor were nominated again in 2010. In 2022, EastEnders won both the Favourite Soap and Favourite Soap Star accolades, with Gillian Wright (Jean Slater) winning the latter.

Year	Category	Nominee(s)	Result	Ref(s)
2008	Favourite Soap Star	Lacey Turner (Stacey Slater)	Won	
2009	Best Double Act	Cheryl Fergison and Linda Henry (Heather Trott and Shirley Carter)	Nominated	
2009	Favourite Newcomer	Maisie Smith (Tiffany Dean)	Nominated	
2009	Favourite Soap Star	Lacey Turner (Stacey Slater)	Won	
2009	Favourite Soap Star	Barbara Windsor (Peggy Mitchell)	Nominated	
2010	Favourite Soap Star	Lacey Turner (Stacey Slater)	Won	
2010	Favourite Soap Star	Barbara Windsor (Peggy Mitchell)	Nominated	
2011	Favourite Soap Star	Jessie Wallace (Kat Moon)	Nominated	
2011	Favourite Soap Star	Jake Wood (Max Branning)	Nominated	
2012	Favourite Newcomer	Danielle Harold (Lola Pearce)	Won	
2012	Favourite Soap Star	Jessie Wallace (Kat Moon)	Nominated	
2012	Favourite Soap Star	Jake Wood (Max Branning)	Nominated	
2016	Favourite Newcomer	Tilly Keeper (Louise Mitchell)	Nominated	
2016	Favourite Soap Star	Jamie Borthwick (Jay Brown)	Nominated	
2016	Favourite Soap Star	Steve McFadden (Phil Mitchell)	Nominated	
2021	Favourite Soap Star	Stevie Basaula (Isaac Baptiste)	Nominated	
2022	Favourite Soap	EastEnders	Won	
2022	Favourite Soap Star	Lacey Turner (Stacey Slater)	Nominated	
2022	Favourite Soap Star	Gillian Wright (Jean Slater)	Won	
2022	Favourite Young Performer	Sonny Kendall (Tommy Moon)	Nominated	
2022	Favourite Young Performer	Lillia Turner (Lily Slater)	Nominated	

== Other awards ==
In 1985, Simon May was nominated for an Ivor Novello Award for Best TV Theme of the Year, for the EastEnders theme tune. It failed to win, but in 1986 the song "Every Loser Wins", which was written by May for a storyline in the show involving the character of Simon Wicks (Nick Berry) and his band The Banned, won the Ivor Novello Award for Best Selling Single.

EastEnders has won four Mental Health Media Awards in the category Soaps and Continual Dramas for its portrayal of mental health issues. EastEnders was given an award in 1997 for the storyline of Joe Wicks (Paul Nicholls) developing schizophrenia. Jessie Wallace received the 2002 award for her portrayal of Kat Slater, a woman who had been raped by her uncle as a teenager and attempted suicide when he returned later in her life. The award was won again in 2006 for the storyline involving Stacey Slater (Lacey Turner) and her mentally ill mother Jean (Gillian Wright). The show was nominated again in 2009 but lost to Pobol y Cwm, however, it won the 'Making a Difference' award. In 2010, EastEnders won in the soaps category again for a storyline involving Stacey. EastEnders has also won the Doing Media Differently in 2009 from the Royal Association for Disability Rights, for the number of characters portrayed with disabilities and illnesses.

In 2006, EastEnders received a Rose d'Or at the international television awards ceremony in Lucerne, Switzerland for its success for over 21 years. Actor Shane Richie also won a Rose d'Or in 2004. In 2006, Wendy Richard (Pauline Fowler) was named Most Popular TV Personality at the Variety Club Awards. The award was voted for by readers of the Daily Express newspaper. At the 2009 Black International Film Festival and Music Video & Screen Awards, Rudolph Walker, who plays Patrick Trueman, received the Lifetime Achievement Award. At the same ceremony, EastEnders was nominated for Best UK Drama with a Black Cast.

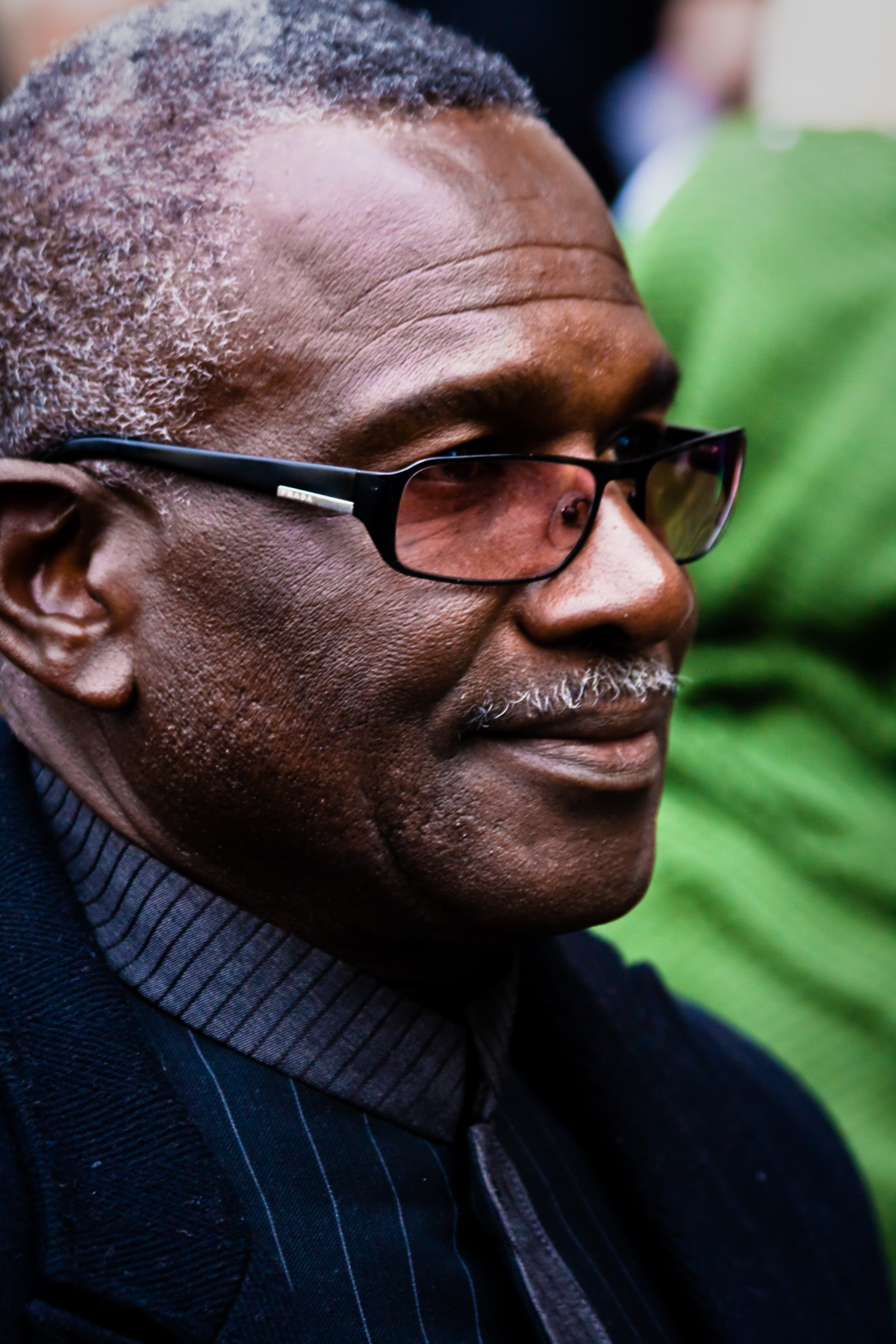
Rudolph Walker won an Ethnic Multicultural Media Award in 2002.

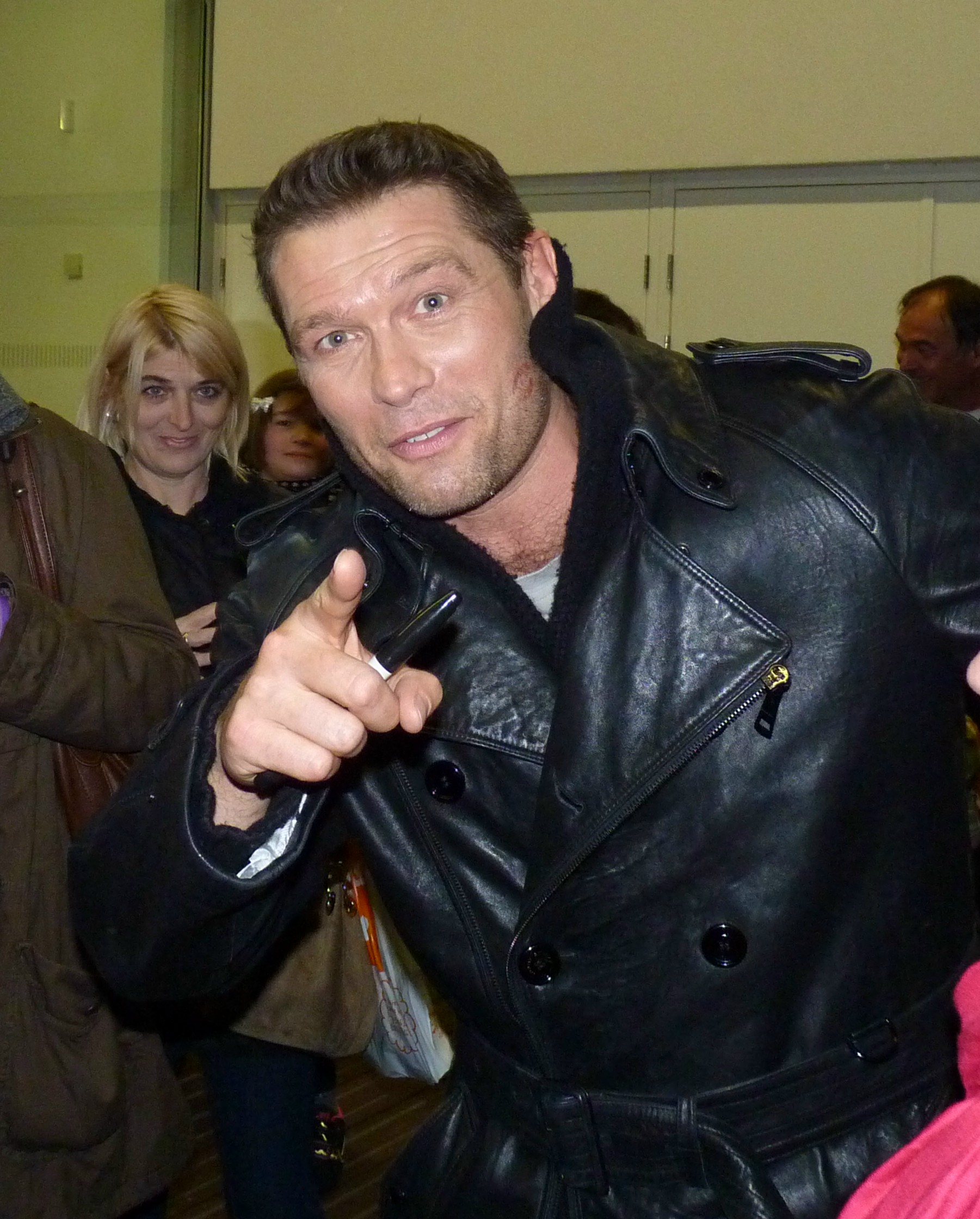
John Partridge won a Stonewall Award for Entertainer of the Year in 2010.

=== Diversity and health-related awards ===
Year	Award	Category	Nominee	Result	Ref(s)
2015	Asian Media Awards	Best TV Character	Rakhee Thakrar (Shabnam Masood)	Won	
2016	Asian Media Awards	Best TV Character	Nitin Ganatra (Masood Ahmed)	Won	
2018	Asian Media Awards	Best TV Character	Nitin Ganatra (Masood Ahmed)	Nominated	
2021	Asian Media Awards	Best TV Character	Jaz Deol (Kheerat Panesar)	Won	
2022	Asian Media Awards	Best TV Character	Balvinder Sopal (Suki Panesar)	Won	
2014	Attitude Awards	Media Recognition Award	EastEnders	Won	
2009	Black International Film Festival and Music Video & Screen Awards	Best UK Actress	Tiana Benjamin (Chelsea Fox)	Won	
2009	Black International Film Festival and Music Video & Screen Awards	Best UK Drama with a Black Cast	EastEnders	Won	
2009	Black International Film Festival and Music Video & Screen Awards	Lifetime Achievement Award	Rudolph Walker (Patrick Trueman)	Won	
2011	Black International Film Festival and Music Video & Screen Awards	Best UK Drama with a Black Cast	EastEnders	Nominated	
2012	Black International Film Festival and Music Video & Screen Awards	Best Newcomer	Ricky Norwood (Fatboy)	Nominated	
2012	Black International Film Festival and Music Video & Screen Awards	Best Soap with a Black Cast or Lead	EastEnders	Won	
2012	Black International Film Festival and Music Video & Screen Awards	Best TV Comedy Performance	Tameka Empson (Kim Fox)	Nominated	
2012	Black International Film Festival and Music Video & Screen Awards	Best UK Actor	Chucky Venn (Ray Dixon)	Won	
2015	Black International Film Festival and Music Video & Screen Awards	Best TV Soap	EastEnders	Won	
2018	Black International Film Festival and Music Video & Screen Awards	Best Emerging Talent	Zack Morris (Keegan Baker)	Won	
2018	Black International Film Festival and Music Video & Screen Awards	Best TV Soap	EastEnders	Won	
2016	British LGBT Awards	Media Moment	Kyle Slater makes his debut on EastEnders	Nominated	
2009	Cosmopolitan Ultimate Women of the Year Awards	Ultimate TV Actress	Lacey Turner (Stacey Slater)	Won	
2009	Cultural Diversity Network Awards	Excellence in creative output – making diversity more mainstream	EastEnders	Nominated	
2010	Cultural Diversity Network Awards	Sainsbury's Award for Mainstreaming Disability	EastEnders	Won	
2002	Ethnic Multicultural Media Awards	TV Actor	Rudolph Walker (Patrick Trueman)	Won	
2004	Ethnic Multicultural Media Awards	TV Actor	Gary Beadle (Paul Trueman)	Nominated	
1997	Mental Health Media Awards	Soaps	EastEnders	Won	
2002	Mental Health Media Awards	Soaps and Continual Drama	Jessie Wallace (Kat Slater)	Won	
2006	Mental Health Media Awards	Soaps and Continual Drama	EastEnders	Won	
2009	Mental Health Media Awards	Soaps and Continual TV Drama	EastEnders	Nominated	
2009	Mental Health Media Awards	Making a Difference	Lacey Turner (Stacey Slater) and Gillian Wright (Jean Slater)	Won	
2010	Mental Health Media Awards	Soaps	EastEnders	Won	
2012	Mind Media Awards	Best portrayal of mental health in the media (soaps)	EastEnders and Adam Woodyatt (Ian Beale)	Nominated	
2019	PinkNews Awards	Drama Award	EastEnders	Won	
2013	Older People in the Media Awards	Best older person's character in a film, TV or radio drama	Ann Mitchell (Cora Cross)	Nominated	
2005	Race in the Media Awards	Best Soap	EastEnders	Nominated	
2012	Radio Times Creative Diversity Network Soap Award	Best Soap Storyline	Episode: 25 December 2011	Nominated	
2009	Royal Association for Disability Rights awards	Doing Media Differently	EastEnders	Won	
2010	Stonewall Awards	Broadcast of the Year	EastEnders	Nominated	
2010	Stonewall Awards	Entertainer of the Year	John Partridge (Christian Clarke)	Won	
2011	Women in TV & Film Awards	Creative Innovation Award	Deborah Sathe (producer, EastEnders: E20)	Won	

=== Others ===
Year	Award	Category	Nominee	Result	Ref(s)
1986	Anna Scher Theatre Awards	Favourite Programme	EastEnders	Won	
2024	AWGIE Awards	Best Script for a Television Serial	Episode 6593 – Peter Mattessi	Nominated	
2025	AWGIE Awards	Best Script for a Television Serial	Episode 6705 – Peter Mattessi	Won	
2007	Banff World Television Festival	Best Telenovela and Drama Serial Program	EastEnders	Won	
2010	Banff World Television Festival	Soap Opera	EastEnders	Nominated	
2010	Banff World Television Festival	Original Online Programs	EastEnders E20	Shortlisted	
2014	BBC Radio 1 Teen Awards	Best British TV Show	EastEnders	Nominated	
2014	BBC Radio 1 Teen Awards	Best British Actor	Lorna Fitzgerald (Abi Branning)	Won	
2010	Broadcast Digital Awards	Best Live Event Coverage (inc Sports)	"EastEnders Live"	Nominated	
2008	Daily Star Soaper Star Awards	Best Actor	Robert Kazinsky (Sean Slater)	Won	
2008	Daily Star Soaper Star Awards	Best Actor	Jake Wood (Max Branning)	Nominated	
2008	Daily Star Soaper Star Awards	Best Actress	Jo Joyner (Tanya Branning)	Nominated	
2008	Daily Star Soaper Star Awards	Best Actress	Lacey Turner (Stacey Slater)	Nominated	
2008	Daily Star Soaper Star Awards	Best Family	Mitchell family	Nominated	
2008	Daily Star Soaper Star Awards	Best Newcomer	Samantha Janus (Ronnie Mitchell)	Won	
2008	Daily Star Soaper Star Awards	Best Newcomer	Rita Simons (Roxy Mitchell)	Nominated	
2008	Daily Star Soaper Star Awards	Best Soap	EastEnders	Won	
2013	Freesat Free TV Awards	Best British TV Soap	EastEnders	Nominated	
2014	Freesat Free TV Awards	Best British TV Soap	EastEnders	Nominated	
2019	Heat Unmissable Awards	Soap of the Year	Eastenders	Won	
2021	Heat Unmissable Awards	Soap of the Year	Eastenders	Won	
2022	Heat Unmissable Awards	Soap of the Year	Eastenders	Won	
2016	International Achievement Recognition Awards	Best Actor TV/Drama	Richard Blackwood (Vincent Hubbard)	Nominated	
2016	International Achievement Recognition Awards	Best Actress	Tameka Empson (Kim Fox-Hubbard)	Nominated	
2016	International Achievement Recognition Awards	Best TV Soap	EastEnders	Nominated	
2017	International Achievement Recognition Awards	Best Actor TV/Drama	Scott Maslen (Jack Branning)	Nominated	
2017	International Achievement Recognition Awards	Best Emerging Actress	Seraphina Beh (Madison Drake)	Won	
2017	International Achievement Recognition Awards	Best Young Actor Film/TV/Drama	Danny Walters (Keanu Taylor)	Won	
1985	Ivor Novello Awards	Best TV Theme of the Year	Simon May (EastEnders theme tune)	Nominated	
1986	Ivor Novello Awards	Best Selling Single of the Year	Simon May ("Every Loser Wins")	Won	
2001	Maxim UK Woman of the Year Awards	Woman of the Year	Tamzin Outhwaite (Mel Healy)	Won	
2002	Maxim UK Woman of the Year Awards	Woman of the Year	Jessie Wallace (Kat Slater)	Won	
2002	MORI poll for World Asthma Day	Britain's Bubbliest Soap Opera Barmaid	Barbara Windsor (Peggy Mitchell)	Won	
2008	MSN Entertainment	Best Christmas Storyline of all time	Den and Angie	Won	
2008	MSN Entertainment	Best Storyline of 2008	Max and Tanya	Won	
2009	Promax Awards	Best Drama Promo (Originated)	EastEnders	Nominated	
1986	Pye Awards	Outstanding Female Personality	Anita Dobson (Angie Watts)	Won	
1986	Pye Awards	Outstanding Male Personality	Leslie Grantham (Den Watts)	Won	
2004	Rose d'Or	Best Performance in a Soap	Shane Richie (Alfie Moon)	Won	
2006	Rose d'Or	Best Soap	EastEnders	Won	
2023	Rose d'Or	Best Soap or Telenovela	EastEnders	Nominated	
2024	Rose d'Or	Best Soap or Telenovela	EastEnders	Nominated	
2004	Soaplife	Top 10 Soap Moments of 2004	Alfie discovered Kat has cheated	9th	
2004	Soaplife	Top 10 Soap Moments of 2004	Dennis Watts' love triangle with Sharon & Zoe	8th	
2004	Soaplife	Top 10 Soap Moments of 2004	Janine framed for murder	7th	
2004	Soaplife	Top 10 Soap Moments of 2004	Dirty Den's return	4th	
2004	Soaplife	Top 10 Soap Moments of 2004	Martin Fowler's one-night stand with Sarah	3rd	
1987	SOS Star Awards	Best TV Programme	EastEnders	Won	
1987	Variety Club Awards	BBC Personality of the Year	Entire cast and crew	Won	
2006	Variety Club Awards	Most Popular TV Personality	Wendy Richard (Pauline Fowler)	Won	
2021	The (Humax) Version Soap Awards	Best Soap	Eastenders	Won	
2021	The (Humax) Version Soap Awards	Best Legend	Letitia Dean (Sharon Watts)	Won	
2021	The (Humax) Version Soap Awards	Best Actress	Linda Henry (Shirley Carter)	Nominated	
2021	The (Humax) Version Soap Awards	Best Actor	Ricky Champ (Stuart Highway)	Nominated	
2021	The (Humax) Version Soap Awards	Best Newcomer	Balvinder Sopal (Suki Panesar)	Nominated	
2021	The (Humax) Version Soap Awards	Best Villain	Toby Smith (Gray Atkins)	Won	
2021	The (Humax) Version Soap Awards	Funniest Character	Laila Morse (Big Mo)	Won	
2021	The (Humax) Version Soap Awards	Best Couple	Max Bowden and Tony Clay (Ben Mitchell and Callum Highway)	Won	
2021	The (Humax) Version Soap Awards	Best Storyline	Mick Carter’s tragic past	Nominated	
2021	The (Humax) Version Soap Awards	Best Exit	Jake Wood (Max Branning)	Nominated	
2012	Virgin Media TV Awards	Best Baddie	Yusef Khan	Nominated	
2012	Virgin Media TV Awards	Best Newbie	David Essex (Eddie Moon)	Nominated	
2012	Virgin Media TV Awards	Best Newbie	Danielle Harold (Lola Pearce)	Nominated	
2012	Virgin Media TV Awards	Best Soap	EastEnders	Won	
2012	Virgin Media TV Awards	Best Soap	EastEnders: E20	Nominated	
2012	Virgin Media TV Awards	Character of the Year	Max Branning (Jake Wood)	Nominated	
2012	Virgin Media TV Awards	Most Explosive TV Moment Of The Year	Ronnie Mitchell's baby swap plot	Nominated	
2011	Webby Awards	Drama	EastEnders: E20	Won	
2011	Writers' Guild of Great Britain Awards	Best Continuing Drama	Simon Ashdown ("Dot's Impossible Decision")	Nominated	
2020	Writers' Guild of Great Britain Awards	Best Long Running TV Series	Peter Mattessi (Episode 5028)	Nominated	
