= Het Oude Noorden =

Dutch television drama

- title sequence
- Genre: Drama
- Written by: Barbara Jurgen
- Directed by: Eddy Habbema
- Country of origin: Netherlands
- Original language: Dutch
- No. of series: 1
- No. of episodes: 20

Production
- Running time: 30 minutes
- Production company: IDTV

Original release
- Network: VARA
- Release: 13 March – 17 July 1993

Related
- EastEnders

Het Oude Noorden (English: The Old North) is a 1993 Dutch drama television series, set in Rotterdam. The series is a remake of the British series EastEnders, which follows families as they go about their lives.

== Cast ==
- Loes Vos – Bep Martens
- Ton Pompert – Willem Martens
- Aletta de Nes – Carolien Martens
- Helen Hedy Pavias – Jozefien Ottevanger Martens
- Paul van Soest – Fred Ottevanger
- Tim Meeuws – Kroegbaas Ger Visser
- Dana Dool – Ankie Visser
- Nora Kretz – Greetje Kuyper
- Jaap Maarleveld – Dokter Ruben Klein
- Amber de Grauw - Tamara Visser
- Cahit Olmez - Sheref Elmaci
- Martin Schwab - Frankie Portier
- Cynthia Abma - Poel van Delden
- Pepijn Gunneweg - Sjoerd Martens
- Hans Breetveld - Johnnie Crooswijk
- Froukje van den Akker - Bianca Ottevanger
- Jaloe Maat - Vera Firat
- Coen van Vlijmen - Vic Ottevanger
- Ramon Ramnath - Jimmy Singh
- Kietje Sewrattan - Aisha Singh
- Vefa Ocal - Avares Firat
- Dennis Rudge - Jeffrey Martina
- Maaike Boulee - Hannie Duvekot

== Episodes ==
#	Air date	Title
1	13 March 1993	Jopie Maas
2	13 March 1993	Ger and Ankie's wedding
3	20 March 1993	Murder
4	20 March 1993	The letter
5	27 March 1993	Hannie and her baby
6	3 April 1993	Jeffrey's container
7	10 April 1993	The dinner party
8	17 April 1993	Willem knows what to do
9	24 April 1993	Dirty affairs
10	1 May 1993	The Assault
11	8 May 1993	Unrest
12	15 May 1993	Vengeance
13	22 May 1993	A beating
14	29 May 1993	Vogelvrij
15	5 June 1993	Gretchen fit
16	12 June 1993	Long Live Love
17	19 June 1993	Small washes, great washes
18	26 June 1993	Bad news
19	10 July 1993	Demolition
20	17 July 1993	A man must not cry
