= EastEnders in popular culture =

Cultural impact of UK soap opera

Since its premiere in 1985, the BBC soap opera EastEnders has had a large impact on popular culture.

== In television ==
A charity crossover between the science fiction television series Doctor Who and EastEnders, Dimensions in Time, was filmed in 1993 for Children in Need and ran in two parts on 26 November and 27 November 1993. It has been proven as non-canon by various references to Doctor Who as fiction in EastEnders, and vice versa. EastEnders has participated in numerous other Children in Need and other fundraisers.

Barry, Sharon, Phil, Pat, Peggy, Beppe, Mark and Dot in 2DTV.

Characters have also been spoofed in the successful BBC comedy sketch show, The Real McCoy (1991–1995). EastEnders and its characters were frequently spoofed in the impressionist sketch show Big Impression, starring Alistair McGowan and Ronni Ancona. Big Impression once screened a one-off special, focusing on EastEnders, called Alistair McGowan's BigEnders. The cartoon sketch show 2DTV has also spoofed EastEnders on many occasions.

The character of Pauline Fowler was mentioned in the successful BBC drama This Life in 1997. In one episode of the show two key characters, Anna and Ferdy, watched an episode of EastEnders on television and mocked Pauline's hysterics and her well documented tendency to wear cardigans.

EastEnders was mentioned in the first episode of Channel 4 sitcom Spaced, as Tim and Daisy are finding out about each other in order to pose as a couple to get a cheap flat.

A special episode of A Question of Sport, A Question of EastEnders, was screened in 2000 to mark the show's fifteenth anniversary.

A sketch in a 1995 episode of A Bit of Fry & Laurie is set in the Fowlers' kitchen, with Stephen Fry, Hugh Laurie, Imelda Staunton and Clive Mantle parodying the speech and mannerisms of the characters of Pauline Fowler and Pete Beale. The dramatic drums at the end of every episode were parodied by SMTV Live in a Friends spoof entitled Chums. The name EastEnders is spoofed in a series of pornographic films called RearEnders, which also spoof the EastEnders logo.

In the last episode of Gimme Gimme Gimme, "Decoy", Linda faked a terminal illness to stop her flatmate, Tom, from moving out. When Tom discovered her lie, Linda defended herself by saying "Well, it worked for Angie Watts!", to which Tom replied "Den and Angie were married!" In this episode, Tom also mentioned throughout the series that he had had a role in EastEnders, as an extra, buying a cagoule from Bianca Jackson's clothes stall. Linda also has a stuffed toy called Carol Jackson.

In the third series of Bo' Selecta!, there was a weekly sketch called 'EastEndings', featuring Ali Osman, Alan Jackson, Pete Beale, Nick Cotton and Kat Slater.

An episode of Two Pints of Lager and a Packet of Crisps entitled "War, Hurrgh!" contains references to Peggy and Grant Mitchell, Angie Watts and Pat Butcher. The episode also ended with the same theme music as EastEnders. Another episode, "Speedycruise!" referred to Pauline and Martin Fowler, and the episode "Finger Sniffing" also refers to Peggy. Also, in the episode "When Janet Met Johnny", Donna sings the line "Don't stay in watching EastEnders." Also, in an episode of Pulling, the character of Donna asks "Who am I going to tell when I have an idea for a new plotline in EastEnders?".

In November 2005, Catherine Tate appeared in another sketch for Children in Need. The segment was a crossover between EastEnders and The Catherine Tate Show, featuring Barbara Windsor as Peggy Mitchell, Kacey Ainsworth as Little Mo Mitchell and Lacey Turner as Stacey Slater from EastEnders and Tate as her well-known character Lauren Cooper from The Catherine Tate Show.

Shaun Williamson frequently plays himself in Ricky Gervais's Extras, where he is referred to at all times as "Barry from EastEnders". Dean Gaffney, who played Robbie Jackson, appeared in the Christmas Special. Derek Martin (Charlie Slater) appeared in episode three in the third series of Little Britain in 2005. The sketch primarily focused around the character Marjorie Dawes telling her Fat Fighters group not to mention the fact that Martin is in EastEnders, then mentioning it herself. In the Comic Relief special of Little Britain, the character Dennis Waterman refers to his "daughter - the one in EastEnders". This is a reference to the real actor Dennis Waterman, who is the father of Hannah Waterman, who played Laura Beale in the show. In another ‘'Little Britain'’ scene, there are several pictures of Matthew Rose on a character's wall.

In one episode of children's show TMi, featuring an interview with Matt Di Angelo (Deano Wicks) and Belinda Owusu (Libby Fox), host Mark Rhodes dressed up as Pauline Fowler, clutching a stuffed toy dog and grimacing at the camera, for a game.

In the 2006 Doctor Who episode The Impossible Planet The Doctor says "That's almost as bad as nothing can possible go wrong, or this is going to be the best Christmas Walford's ever had." In the episode Army of Ghosts, Barbara Windsor appears as Peggy Mitchell where she bars a ghost whom she presumes to be Den Watts from The Queen Victoria. Watts, presumed killed in 1989, returned to the soap in 2003, before being killed a second time in 2005 after being written out of the show.

For Red Nose Day 2007, Aardman Animations created a Creature Comforts style short featuring the dog Wellard, who appeared in various places including Albert Square and outside a pub called The Dirty Den, asking other dogs for charity donations, attempting to sell his offspring and being put in prison.

In the 2007 documentary F*** Off, I'm Ginger, Charlie Clements discussed his character Bradley Branning's geekiness, and the relation to his ginger hair. Pauline and Sonia Fowler were mentioned in the fourth episode of Gavin & Stacey. The fifth episode also referred to Shobu Kapoor by her character name, Gita, and mentioned Pat Butcher. It was also mentioned by the character Mick Shipman played by Larry Lamb in the 2008 Christmas special. Coincidentally, Lamb was also appearing in EastEnders at the time as Archie Mitchell

In The Kevin Bishop Show, Kevin Bishop portrays the actor David Mitchell who arrives in Albert Square as the third Mitchell brother. The sketches include parodies of the characters Peggy Mitchell and Stacey Slater and are filmed in the style of Peep Show, in which David Mitchell stars.

In a 2008 episode of The Sarah Jane Adventures entitled "The Mark of the Berserker", Rani physically forces her father to make an over exaggerated impression of the character Bianca yelling "Ricky!"

The show was mentioned on a 2010 episode of Channel 4 sitcom The IT Crowd.

In 2010 in the Doctor Who episode "The Beast Below", The Queen Victoria pub can be seen briefly in the background. Later in Doctor Who Confidential in the episode "All About the Girl" it was revealed not to be the real Queen Vic pub but a set cut out.

In 2010 in Miranda series 2 episode 3 "Let's Do It", Miranda plays the EastEnders Drumbeat over an episode of EastEnders.

In 2011 at the start of the National Television Awards a mini episode of Doctor Who entitled Dermot and the Doctor sees Dot Branning (June Brown) implying The Doctor only has one set of clothes and he regularly visits Bridge Street Laundrette.

A main character in the 2012 series Line of Duty is nicknamed Matthew "Dot" Cotton in reference to the EastEnders icon.

In 2013 Mrs. Brown's Boys Series 3 Episode 5, Kathy answers the door and the EastEnders drum beat plays while she realises Mick her ex-boyfriend has returned.

In December 2014, Olly Murs appeared in a special episode made for his ITV TV special A Night in With Olly Murs. In the episode, Murs stops off at Albert Square and meets Alfie Moon who mistakes him for Bruno Mars.

In 2014, Not Going Out, Series 7 Episode - 10 Christmas Special, Geoffrey asked why Lee is sitting on his backside watching EastEnders. Later he also tells him that he is going to need another best man for this wedding and the Doof Doof drums plays.

In 2015, the American adult animated science fiction sitcom Rick and Morty referenced EastEnders where in the episode "Interdimensional Cable 2: Tempting Fate", where-in Rick, Morty, and Summer watch BBC Two where a British narrator states that the next programme to be on was the "Northsiders".

A scene from EastEnders of characters Mick (Danny Dyer) and Linda Carter (Kellie Bright) talking could be seen in an episode of the BBC Three series This Country in 2018.

== In music ==
BBC Radio 1 DJ Chris Moyles remixed the Shaggy single "It Wasn't Me", singing about the "Who Shot Phil?" storyline. The theme tune of EastEnders has been parodied by MC Devvo, DJ Osymyso and Oxide & Neutrino. EastEnders is also mentioned in Sway DaSafo's remix of the Lily Allen song "LDN".Ian Hunter's album Rant contains a song called "Dead Man Walkin' (EastEnders)".

The Philadelphia-based Punk band The Dead Milkmen's 1988 album Beelzebubba contains a song called "Bad Party", with the lyrics, "I'm gonna shoot somebody / If they don't stop talking about EastEnders." When "Beelzebubba" was released, "EastEnders" aired on WHYY, the Philadelphia PBS station. British rap group Fierce Girl have a song, called "What Makes a Girl Fierce", with a chorus containing the lyrics, "Kat Slater is our sister."

EastEnders is also mentioned in the song "Sirens" by Dizzee Rascal, "Kill the Director" by The Wombats, "Wouldn't Have It Any Other Way" by The Streets, and Tippa Irie's 'Complain Neighbour'

The 2015 Stormzy song "Know Me From" samples EastEnders, using an audio clip where Shirley Carter exclaims "I've got a gun Phil!", before she shoots him.

EastEnders is also sampled in the 2021 Mr Traumatik song, Absolute, with the viral clip of Kat Slater - "I didn't become a little bit of a slag, I became a total slag".

== In theatre ==
EastEnders is referred to in John Godber's 1987 play Teechers. The drama students, Gail, Salty and Hobby, say that they have acted out a part of EastEnders, quoting "Hello, Arfur... All right, my love".

When Emmerdale actor Nick Miles (who plays Jimmy King) starred in a play at the Edinburgh Festival called Meeting Joe Strummer, his character was from Walford. Miles said in an interview that his character was originally going to be from the village of Emmerdale, but it was changed to Walford for fun.

== In advertising ==
During the 1990s, whilst on a hiatus from EastEnders, Mike Reid starred in an advert for the soft drink Oasis, whose slogan at the time was "Open, pour, be yourself once more". In the advert, Reid, dressed as Frank, drank the beverage and trod in a cow pat, after which he took on a miserable disposition and exclaimed "Pat... Oh Pat, what have you done to me Pat?" in a blatant reference to his EastEnders alter ego.

In 1997, a BT commercial promoting its Friends and Family service featured ten former EastEnders stars. In the commercial, Letitia Dean calls nine former cast members; Susan Tully, Tom Watt, Leslie Grantham, Anna Wing, Oscar James, Linda Davidson, Peter Dean, Michelle Collins (in a scene shot in Paris to reflect the fact an international number could be included in the list - the advert itself was aired shortly after Cindy Beale was seen leaving on the Eurostar) and Bill Treacher (in a scene shot on an allotment to reflect the fact that one mobile number could be included). The BBC threatened BT with legal action, but the telecoms company released the advert for screening anyway. The BBC withdrew its threat to sue after BT paid it an undisclosed five-figure amount.

Leslie Grantham also appeared in an advertisement for Radox Everfresh in the late 1990s. The first line of the commercial was "Not so Dirty Den now, eh?", and the final line was "Life after soap... no problem".

== Other ==
In Squidgygate, Princess Diana likens her situation to that of one of the characters, presumably Angie Watts (Anita Dobson).

A promotional picture of Pauline Fowler and Joe Macer was used on the official Torchwood website, in a fictional magazine article about aliens. Ben Rawson Jones compares the arguments between Gwen and Rhys in Torchwood to "the kitchen sink melodrama usually seen in EastEnders".

The Office for National Statistics have attributed the rise in babies called Ruby in 2006 to the character of Ruby Allen. It is also mentioned frequently in the Shopaholic book series written by Sophie Kinsella as the favourite TV show of Becky Bloomwood, the main character.

The monthly Dot Cotton Club, a gay club night in Cambridge, is named after the character of Dot Branning, who was previously named Dot Cotton. Dot is probably the most notable smoker on British television as she rarely appears on-screen without a cigarette. The character is so synonymous with smoking that the term "Dot Cotton syndrome" is used within the health industry to: "describe the elderly population who continue to smoke heavily without registering the health problems they are or will soon suffer from, seeing it as their only pleasure left in life".

Chris Moyles' Difficult Second Book contains a chapter called "There Is No Carry On in EastEnders", referring to many things that cannot exist in the EastEnders fictional world, due to actors appearing in both TV shows, including Spandau Ballet (Martin Kemp), Carry On (Barbara Windsor), Grange Hill (Todd Carty and Susan Tully), Hotel Babylon and Red Cap (Tamzin Outhwaite), Jonny Briggs and Star Wars (Leslie Schofield), Lovejoy and Only Fools and Horses (John Bardon), Bergerac, Inspector Morse and Minder (Perry Fenwick), The Sweeney and Eldorado (Derek Martin), Are You Being Served? and Dad's Army (Wendy Richard), "Parklife" and Quadrophenia (Phil Daniels) and A Touch of Frost (Kyte).

The comic book League of Extraordinary Gentlemen vol 1 #6 included characters named Mitchell and Watts (described as a "dirty denizen of the East End") in the Artful Dodger's gang in the late 19th century.

On April Fools' Day 2019, TheJournal.ie published a report on Prime Minister Theresa May's scheduled appearance on that night's special live episode of EastEnders, details of which had been leaked by Taoiseach Leo Varadkar overnight. May's purpose was to issue a final plea for unity as Brexit entered a critical stage. The internet publication featured a photograph of May in The Queen Victoria pub, with the caption "Rehearsal shot of hostile locals witnessing May's arrival". It even went so far as to compose fake documents to back up its claim, including a draft script said to have been provided by the BBC to highlight the ever-changing difficulties of keeping up with political events as they rapidly unfolded: "'This is the 416th draft' the source said. 'And her appearance was only confirmed at the start of March. Brexit won't stop f*****g, c*****g changing every two seconds. It's driving the actors mad.'" A short video clip shows actor Adam Woodyatt (who portrays the character of Ian Beale) being comforted by colleague Steve McFadden (who portrays the character Phil Mitchell), as Woodyatt bursts into tears due to the protracted rehearsals.

The preliminary script – which, TheJournal.ie reminded readers, was "contingent on what the hell happens in Brexit over the course of today" — had Dot Cotton (played by June Brown) gasping as Theresa May enters the pub. May, having begun her speech, is interrupted by Mick Carter (played by Danny Dyer) who knocks over a pint and a chair in his efforts to have the Prime Minister leave the pub. May departs and perches herself despondently on a park bench, whereupon Kat Slater (played by Jessie Wallace) approaches her with "Alright love? What's getting you down?" May tells Slater she has already blamed everyone – the Irish, the Democratic Unionist Party, the European Union — and is at a loss for who is left for her to find fault with now. Slater advises her to be honest. May finds solace in this, thanks Slater, remarks on the chilliness of the night and Slater hands the Prime Minister her leopard print jacket to put on. May returns to the pub and seemingly converts all the customers bar Dot Cotton, who is promptly ejected onto the street.
