= List of programs broadcast by Showcase =

List of Showcase shows

This is a list of television programs formerly and currently broadcast by the Canadian television channel Showcase.

== Current programming ==
=== Drama ===
- All American (2018)
- Bel-Air (February 14, 2022)
- Culprits (2023)
- Dr. Death (September 12, 2021)
- FBI (2020)
- FBI: International
- FBI: Most Wanted (2020)
- Suburban Screams (October 18, 2023)
- NCIS (2009)
- Unwanted (January 12, 2024)

=== Comedy ===
- Dinner with the Parents
- Killing It (May 31, 2022)
- Ted (January 11, 2024)
- We Are Lady Parts (June 9, 2021)

=== Canadian content reruns ===
- Andromeda (2007–11; 2022)
- Border Security: Canada's Front Line
- Face to Face with David
- Private Eyes
- Ransom (2020–21; 2023)
- Rookie Blue
- Saving Hope (2023)
- Schitt's Creek

== Former programming ==
Title	Genre	First broadcast	Last broadcast
9-1-1			
Absentia	Thriller	January 21, 2018	November 26, 2020
Adventures in Rainbow Country (Canada)	Children's	January 28, 1995	September 1, 1996
The Adventures of the Black Stallion (Canada)	Family	January 3, 1995	January 21, 2000
The Adventures of Dudley the Dragon (Canada)	Children's	September 2, 1996	April 16, 1999
The Adventures of Sinbad (Canada)	Drama		
afterlife	Drama		
Alibi			
An American in Canada	Comedy		
Angelyne	Drama	June 1, 2022	June 29, 2022
Angels in America	Drama		
The Animals of Farthing Wood	Children's	September 18, 1995	August 30, 1996
A.P. Bio	Comedy	2021	2021
Aphrodisia			
The Associates (Canada)	Drama		
A Town Called Malice	Crime thriller	April 16, 2023	2023
Batwoman	Superhero drama	October 6, 2019	March 2, 2022
Beastmaster (Canada)	Science fiction		
Beauty & the Beast	Drama	October 11, 2012	September 11, 2016
The Berenstain Bears	Children's	January 14, 1996	January 4, 1998
The Bill	Drama		
Billable Hours (Canada)	Comedy	2006	
Bliss (Canada)	Drama anthology	2002	2004
Blood Strangers			
Boardwalk Empire	Crime drama		
Bones	Crime drama		
Brave New World	Science fiction	2020	2020
Briarpatch	Drama	February 16, 2020	April 27, 2020
Bulletproof	Crime drama	September 30, 2020	March 31, 2021
Bupkis	Comedy	May 25, 2023	2024?
Burn Notice	Drama		
Bust Down	Comedy	May 31, 2022	July 5, 2022
Captain Zed and the Zee Zone	Children's	October 30, 1995	December 27, 1997
Cock'd Gunns (Canada)			
Code 404	Police comedy-drama	2021	2022
Cold Squad (Canada)	Drama		
Continuum (Canada)	Science fiction		
Copper (Canada)	Period		
Counterstrike (Canada)	Drama		
The Cooks			
Covert Affairs	Drama		
Cracker	Drama	January 17, 1999	
Cra$h & Burn (Canada)	Drama	November 18, 2009	
The Calling	Crime drama	2022	2022
CSI: Crime Scene Investigation	Drama		
CSI: Miami	Drama		
CSI: NY	Drama		
Curb Your Enthusiasm	Comedy		
Da Ali G Show	Comedy		
Damages	Drama		
Da Vinci's City Hall (Canada)	Drama		
Da Vinci's Inquest (Canada)	Drama		
Dead Like Me	Drama		
Dead Man's Gun (Canada)	Anthology, Western, Drama		
Deadwood	Drama		
Debbie Does Dallas ... Again			
Defiance	Drama	2013	
Degrassi Junior High (Canada)	Drama	September 1, 1997	October 21, 2005
Degrassi High (Canada)	Drama	September 1, 1997	November 18, 2005
Departure (Canada)	Drama	2020	2022
The Dice			
Doc (Canada)	Drama		
The Dreamstone	Children's	January 1, 1995	September 1, 1996
The Drunk and On Drugs Happy Fun Time Hour (Canada)	Comedy	2010	
Due South (Canada)	Comedy-drama		
Dumb and Dumber	Children's	October 28, 1995; January 11, 1998	August 31, 1996; August 16, 1998
Earth: Final Conflict (Canada)	Science fiction		
EastEnders	Drama		
The Edison Twins (Canada)	Children's	January 1, 1995	August 16, 1998
Emily of New Moon (Canada)	Drama		
Endgame (Canada)	Drama	2011	
E.N.G. (Canada)	Drama	January 4, 1995	August 24, 2001
Eric's World (Canada)	Children's	September 11, 1995	August 30, 1996
Exes and Ohs (Canada)	Drama		
Fairly Legal	Legal drama		
Family Business			
Final Demand			
Flash Forward (Canada)	Comedy		
Footballers' Wives	Soap opera		
Foreign Objects (Canada)	Drama		
Forever Knight (Canada)	Horror crime drama	September 1, 1997	August 10, 2001
The Forest Rangers (Canada)	Children's	January 1, 1995	August 30, 1996
The Foundation (Canada)	Comedy	2009	
The Friendly Giant (Canada)	Children's	1998	1999
A Friend of the Family	Crime drama	October 17, 2022	2022
G-Spot (Canada)			
Game of Thrones	Fantasy		
Gotham Knights	Superhero drama	2023	2023
The Grid			
The Guest Book	Comedy		
Happy!	Comedy/action-drama	December 7, 2017	May 30, 2019
Haven (Canada)	Drama	2010	
Hawkeye	Action	December 27, 2021	October 16, 2022
Helix	Fantasy	2014	
Highlander: The Raven (Canada)	Fantasy		
Highlander: The Series (Canada)	Fantasy		
The Hilarious House of Frightenstein (Canada)	Children's	September 2, 1996	December 13, 1997
Hitmen	Comedy	2020	
Hotel Babylon			
House	Drama		
Huff	Comedy-drama		
Incorporated	Drama	November 30, 2016	January 25, 2017 (reran in 2020)
Intelligence (Canada)	Drama		
Intelligence	Sitcom	September 13, 2020	2021
Interrogation	Crime drama	September 24, 2020	2020
In the Red	Crime drama	January 25, 1999	January 26, 1999
Iris the Happy Professor (Canada)	Children's	October 2, 1995	July 5, 1996
Irreverent	Crime thriller/comedy	January 8, 2023	2023
Is Harry on the Boat?	Comedy		
It's Always Sunny in Philadelphia	Comedy		
It's Me...Gerald (Canada)	Comedy		
Jekyll			
Joan of Arcadia			
Joe vs. Carole	Drama	March 23, 2022	May 11, 2022
Justified	Drama		
Kath & Kim (Australian version)	Comedy		
The Kennedys (Canada)	History drama		
Kenny vs. Spenny (Canada)	Comedy		
The Kids of Degrassi Street (Canada)	Children's	January 1, 1995	July 22, 1996
King (Canada)	Drama		
Kingdom Adventure (Canada)	Children's	January 1, 1995	December 9, 1995
KinK (Canada)	Documentary	April 6, 2001	
Kung Fu: The Legend Continues (Canada)	Adventure		
The L Word (Canada)	Drama		
The Last Chapter			
Law and Order: Special Victim Unit	Drama		
Law and Order UK	Drama		
Legacies	Fantasy drama	October 25, 2018	June 16, 2022
The Legend of White Fang (Canada)	Children's	September 11, 1995	August 16, 1998
Lexx (Canada)	Science fiction		
Liberty Street (Canada)	Drama		
Life	Drama		
The Life and Times of Vivienne Vyle	Comedy		
Life on Mars (UK version)	Drama		
The Line of Beauty			
Little Britain	Comedy		
Little Britain USA	Comedy		
The Little Flying Bears (Canada)	Children's	September 7, 1996	October 18, 1998
Little Mouse on the Prairie	Children's	September 6, 1997	August 22, 1999
Looking After Jo Jo	Drama	October 11, 1999	October 12, 1999
Lost Girl (Canada)	Supernatural drama	September 12, 2010; 2023	February 8, 2020; 2023
Lovespring International	Comedy		
MacGruber	Action comedy	January 9, 2022	2022
Made in Canada	Comedy		
Madeline	Children's	September 7, 1996	August 16, 1998
Madison (Canada)	Teen drama	January 11, 1999	January 12, 2003
The Magicians	Fantasy	2015	April 1, 2020
Maniac Mansion (Canada)	Sitcom	September 2, 1996	April 28, 2002
The Mask: Animated Series	Children's	September 9, 1995	August 10, 1996
Matrix (Canada)	Fantasy		
Max Glick (Canada)	Children's	May 7, 2000	August 6, 2000
MDA	Drama		
Metrosexuality	Comedy		
The Mighty Jungle (Canada)	Sitcom	August 23, 1998	April 29, 2000
The Mind of the Married Man			
Moccasin Flats (Canada)	Drama		
Mom P.I. (Canada)	Dramedy	November 18, 1996	August 5, 2001
Moose TV (Canada)	Comedy		
MotherFatherSon	Drama	July 7, 2019	August 25, 2019
Mr. Robot	Drama	2015	2019
Murder in Suburbia			
Murphy's Law	Drama		
My Bare Lady			
My So-Called Life	Drama		
Naked Josh (Canada)	Comedy-drama		
Naomi	Drama	January 11, 2022	May 10, 2022
NCIS: Los Angeles			
Neon Rider (Canada)	Drama	January 11, 1999	
The New Addams Family (Canada)			
The New Statesman	Comedy		
The Newsroom (Canada)	Comedy-drama		
Nighty Night			
Nikita (Canada)	Drama		
No Activity	Comedy	October 25, 2020	2020
North of 60 (Canada)	Drama		
Numbers	Drama		
The Office (UK version)	Comedy		
Orson and Olivia	Children's	September 8, 1996	January 4, 1998
Out of Order			
The Outer Limits (Canada)	Science fiction	2020	2023
Ovide and the Gang (Canada)	Children's	September 7, 1996	January 30, 1999
Oz	Drama	January 5, 1998	
Paradise Falls (Canada)	Drama	June 25, 2001	
Playmakers			
Pennyworth	Crime thriller	2019	2022
Poltergeist: The Legacy	Horror		
Porno Valley			
Problem Child	Children's	March 7, 1998	August 21, 1999
Proof			
Pure Pwnage (Canada)	Comedy	2010	
Queer as Folk (North American version) (Canada)	Drama		
Queer as Folk (UK version)	Drama		
Queer as Folk	Drama	June 26, 2022	August 14, 2022
Schitt's Creek	Comedy	2020	2021
Real Sex			
Red Shoe Diaries	Drama anthology		
Redcap			
ReGenesis (Canada)	Drama		
Rent-a-Goalie (Canada)	Comedy		
Rescue Me	Comedy-drama		
The Resort	Crime comedy	2022	2022
The Riches	Drama		
Rizzoli & Isles	Drama	January 3, 2012	
Roswell, New Mexico	Science fiction	2019	2022
Royal Pains	Medical Drama		
Runaways	Drama	2017	January 20, 2020
Rutherford Falls	Sitcom	April 29, 2021	September 27, 2022
Saving Grace	Drama		
Saxondale			
School's Out (Canada)	Drama		
The Second Coming			
Secret Diary of a Call Girl			
Seven Days (Canada)			
Sexual Anthropology			
Shameless			
Sharky & George	Children's	September 2, 1996	August 21, 1999
The Shield	Drama		
Ship to Shore	Children's	September 7, 1996	August 31, 1997
Show Me Yours (Canada)			
Silent Witness			
Sin Cities			
Sin Cities: A Life Less Ordinary			
The Sinner	Crime drama	2017	2021
Sirens (Canada)	Crime drama	January 11, 1999	
Skippy the Bush Kangaroo	Children's	July 29, 1995	January 7, 1996
Slings & Arrows (Canada)	Comedy		
Six Feet Under	Drama		
Spaced			
Starved			
State of Play	Drama		
The State Within			
The Starter Wife			
Student Bodies (Canada)	Comedy	January 5, 2008	August 30, 2008
Supergirl	Drama	October 10, 2016	November 9, 2021
Swamp Thing	Drama	September 2, 2019	October 29, 2019
Swinging			
Sweating Bullets			
Tell Me a Story	Thriller	2020	2020
Temple	Crime drama	2020	2022
thirtysomething	Drama	June 10, 1996	
This Hour Has 22 Minutes (Canada)	Comedy		
The Tick	Animated	September 7, 1996	August 15, 1998
Tinsel Town	Drama	May 1, 2001	
Tom Stone (Canada)	Drama		
Tom Swift	Drama	2022	2022
The Tracey Ullman Show	Comedy	September 8, 1996	
Trailer Park Boys (Canada)	Comedy	April 22, 2001	September 4, 2011
Travelers (Canada)	Science fiction	2016	2018
Trial & Retribution			
Twitch City (Canada)	Comedy		
The Undeclared War	Drama	2022	2022
Vikings (Canada)	Drama		
Warehouse 13	Science fiction		
Water Rats			
Webdreams (Canada)	Documentary	2005	
Weeds	Comedy		
Wire in the Blood			
Wojeck (Canada)	Drama		
Wolfe	Crime drama	2022	2022
XIII: The Series (Canada)	Action	2011	
