= EastEnders =

British television soap opera (1985–present)

- Genre: Soap opera
- Created by: Julia Smith; Tony Holland
- Written by: Various
- Directed by: Various
- Starring: Present cast; Former cast
- Theme music composer: Simon May; Leslie Osborne
- Opening theme: EastEnders theme tune
- Country of origin: United Kingdom
- Original language: English
- No. of episodes: 7,438

Production
- Executive producers: Various (currently Ben Wadey)
- Producers: Various (currently Sharon Batten, series producer)
- Production location: BBC Elstree Centre
- Camera setup: Video, multiple-camera setup
- Running time: 30–60 minutes
- Production company: BBC Studios Continuing Drama Productions

Original release
- Network: BBC One
- Release: 19 February 1985 – present
- Network: BBC iPlayer
- Release: 14 June 2021 – present

Related
- Het Oude Noorden (1993); EastEnders Revealed (1998–2012, 2025); EastEnders: E20 (2010–2011); Kat & Alfie: Redwater (2017); Various spin-offs

EastEnders is a British television soap opera created by Julia Smith and Tony Holland which has been broadcast on BBC One since February 1985. Set in the fictional borough of Walford in the East End of London, the programme follows the stories of local residents and their families as they go about their daily lives. Within eight months of the show's original launch, it had reached the number one spot in BARB's television ratings, and has consistently remained among the top-rated series in Britain. Four EastEnders episodes are listed in the all-time top 10 most-watched programmes in the UK, including the number one spot, when more than 30 million watched the 1986 Christmas Day episode. EastEnders has been important in the history of British television drama, tackling many subjects that are considered to be controversial or taboo in British culture, and portraying a social life previously unseen on UK mainstream television.

Since co-creator Holland was from a large family in the East End, a theme heavily featured in EastEnders is strong families, and each character is supposed to have their own place in the fictional community. The Watts, Beales and Fowlers, Mitchells, Brannings and the Slaters are some of the families that have been central to the soap's notable and dramatic storylines. EastEnders has been filmed at the BBC Elstree Centre since its inception, with a set that is outdoors and open to weather. In 2014, the BBC announced plans to rebuild the set entirely. Filming commenced on the new set in January 2022, and it was first used on-screen in March 2022. Demolition on the old set commenced in November 2022.

EastEnders has received both praise and criticism for many of its storylines, which have dealt with difficult themes including violence, rape, murder and abuse. It has been criticised for various storylines, including the 2010 baby swap storyline, which attracted more than 6,000 complaints, as well as complaints of showing too much violence and allegations of national and racial stereotypes. However, EastEnders has also been commended for representing real-life issues and spreading awareness on social topics. The cast and crew of the show have received and been nominated for various awards.

== History ==
=== Conception and preparations for broadcast ===
In March 1983, under two years before EastEnders' first episode was broadcast, the show was a vague idea in the mind of a handful of BBC executives, who decided that what BBC One needed was a popular twice-weekly drama series that would attract the kind of mass audiences that ITV were getting with Coronation Street. The first people to whom David Reid, then head of series and serials, turned were Julia Smith and Tony Holland, a well established producer/script editor team who had first worked together on Z-Cars. The outline that Reid presented was vague: two episodes a week, 52 weeks a year. After the concept was put to them on 14 March 1983, Smith and Holland then went about putting their ideas down on paper; they decided it would be set in the East End of London. It was decided after a report indicated that a show focusing on a working-class London neighbourhood would have the most widespread appeal. Granada Television gave Smith unrestricted access to the Coronation Street production for a month so that she could get a sense of how a continuing drama was produced. The show initially had the working title East 8 and was, at first, to be set in a real street in Hackney, London.

Several cities were considered for the show's setting, including Manchester and Birmingham, before ultimately choosing London. There was anxiety at first that the viewing public would not accept a new soap set in the south of England, though research commissioned by lead figures in the BBC revealed that southerners would accept a northern soap, northerners would accept a southern soap and those from the Midlands, as Julia Smith herself pointed out, did not mind where it was set as long as it was somewhere else. This was the beginning of a close and continuing association between EastEnders and audience research, which, though commonplace today, was something of a revolution in practice.

The show's creators were both Londoners, but when they researched Victorian squares, they found massive changes in areas they thought they knew well; however, delving further into the East End of London, they found exactly what they had been searching for: a real East End spirit, an inward-looking quality, a distrust of strangers and authority figures, a sense of territory and community that the creators summed up as "Hurt one of us and you hurt us all".

When developing EastEnders, both Smith and Holland looked at influential models like Coronation Street, but they found that it offered a rather outdated and nostalgic view of working-class life. Only after EastEnders began, and featured the characters of Tony Carpenter and Kelvin Carpenter, did Coronation Street start to feature black characters, for example. They came to the conclusion that Coronation Street had grown old with its audience, and that EastEnders would have to attract a younger, more socially extensive audience, ensuring that it had the longevity to retain it for many years thereafter. They also looked at Brookside, but found there was a lack of central meeting points for the characters, making it difficult for the writers to intertwine different storylines, so EastEnders was set in Albert Square.

A previous UK soap set in an East End market was ATV's Market in Honey Lane; however, between 1967 and 1969, this show, which graduated from one showing a week to two in three separate series (the latter series being shown in different time slots across the ITV network) was very different in style and approach from EastEnders. The British Film Institute described Market in Honey Lane thus: "It was not an earth-shaking programme, and certainly not pioneering in any revolutionary ideas in technique and production, but simply proposed itself to the casual viewer as a mildly pleasant affair."

The target launch date was originally January 1985. Smith and Holland had 11 months in which to write, cast and shoot the whole thing; however, in February 1984, they did not even have a title or a place to film. Both Smith and Holland were unhappy about the January 1985 launch date, favouring November or even September 1984 when seasonal audiences would be higher, but the BBC stayed firm, and Smith and Holland had to concede that, with the massive task of getting the Elstree studios operational, January was the most realistic date; however, this was later to be changed to February.

The project had a number of working titles: Square Dance, Round the Square, Round the Houses, London Pride and East 8. It was the latter that stuck (E8 is the postcode for Hackney) in the early months of creative process; however, the show was renamed after many casting agents mistakenly thought the show was to be called Estate, and the fictional postcode E20 was created, instead of using E8. Julia Smith came up with the name Eastenders after she and Holland had spent months telephoning theatrical agents and asking "Do you have any real East Enders on your books?" Smith thought "Eastenders" "looked ugly written down" and was "hard to say", so decided to capitalise the second "e".

==== Initial character creation and casting ====
After they decided on the filming location of BBC Elstree Centre in south Hertfordshire, Smith and Holland set about creating the 23 characters needed, in just 14 days. They took a holiday in Playa de los Pocillos, Lanzarote, and started to devise the characters. Holland created the Beale and Fowler family, drawing on his own background. His mother, Ethel Holland, was one of four sisters raised in Walthamstow. Her eldest sister, Lou, had married a man named Albert Beale and had two children, named Peter and Pauline. These family members were the basis for Lou Beale, Pete Beale and Pauline Fowler. Holland also created Pauline's unemployed husband Arthur Fowler, their children Mark and Michelle, Pete's wife Kathy and their son Ian. Smith used her personal memories of East End residents she met when researching Victorian squares. Ethel Skinner was based on an old woman she met in a pub, with ill-fitting false teeth, and a "face to rival a neon sign", holding a Yorkshire Terrier in one hand and a pint of Guinness in the other.

Other characters created included Jewish doctor Harold Legg, the Anglo-Cypriot Osman family (Ali, Sue and baby Hassan), black father and son Tony and Kelvin Carpenter, single mother Mary Smith and Bangladeshi couple Saeed and Naima Jeffery. Jack, Pearl and Tracey Watts were created to bring "flash, trash, and melodrama" to the Square (they were later renamed Den, Angie and Sharon). The characters of Andy O'Brien and Debbie Wilkins were created to show a modern couple with outwardly mobile pretensions, and Lofty Holloway to show an outsider, someone who did not fit in with other residents. It was decided that he would be a former soldier, as Holland's personal experiences of ex-soldiers were that they had trouble fitting into society after being in the army. When they compared the characters they had created, Smith and Holland realised they had created a cross-section of East End residents. The Beale and Fowler family represented the old families of the East End, who had always been there. The Osmans, Jefferys and Carpenters represented the more modern diverse ethnic community of the East End. Debbie, Andy and Mary represented more modern-day individuals.

Once they had decided on their 23 characters, they returned to London for a meeting with the BBC. Everyone agreed that EastEnders would be tough, violent on occasion, funny and sharp—set in Margaret Thatcher's Britain—and it would start with a bang (namely the death of Reg Cox). They decided that none of their existing characters were wicked enough to have killed Reg, so a 24th character, Nick Cotton, was added to the line-up. He was a racist thug, who often tried to lead other young characters astray. When all the characters had been created, Smith and Holland set about casting the actors, which also involved the input of lead director Matthew Robinson, who supervised auditions with the other directors at the outset, Vivienne Cozens and Peter Edwards.

==== Final preparations ====
Through the next few months, the set was growing rapidly at Elstree, and a composer and designer had been commissioned to create the title sequence. Simon May wrote the theme music and Alan Jeapes created the visuals. The visual images were taken from an aircraft flying over the East End of London at 1000 feet. Approximately 800 photographs were taken and pieced together to create one big image. The credits were later updated when the Millennium Dome was built.

The launch was delayed until February 1985 due to a delay in the chat show Wogan, that was to be a part of the major revamp in BBC1's schedules. Smith was uneasy about the late start as EastEnders no longer had the winter months to build up a loyal following before the summer ratings lull. The press were invited to Elstree to meet the cast and see the lot, and stories immediately started circulating about the show, about a rivalry with ITV (which was launching its own market-based soap, Albion Market) and about the private lives of the cast. Anticipation and rumour grew in equal measure until the first transmission at 7 p.m. on 19 February 1985. Neither Holland nor Smith could watch; they both instead returned to the place where it all began, Albertine's Wine Bar on Wood Lane. The next day, viewing figures were confirmed at 17 million. The reviews were largely favourable, although, after three weeks on air, BBC1's early evening share had returned to the pre-EastEnders figure of seven million, though EastEnders then climbed to highs of up to 23 million later on in the year. Following the launch, both group discussions and telephone surveys were conducted to test audience reaction to early episodes.

=== 1980s broadcast history ===
The show's first episode attracted some 17 million viewers, and it continued to attract high viewing figures from then on. By Christmas 1985, the tabloids could not get enough of the soap. "Exclusives" about EastEnders storylines and the actors on the show became a staple of tabloid buyers' daily reading.

In 1987, the show featured the first same-sex kiss on a British soap, when Colin Russell (Michael Cashman) kissed boyfriend Barry Clark (Gary Hailes) on the forehead. This was followed, in January 1989, by the first on-the-mouth gay kiss in a British soap when Colin kissed a new character, Guido Smith (Nicholas Donovan), in an episode that was watched by 17 million people.

Writer Colin Brake suggested that 1989 was a year of big change for EastEnders, both behind the cameras and in front of them. Original production designer Keith Harris left the show, and Holland and Smith both decided that the time had come to move on as well, their final contribution coinciding with the exit of one of EastEnders' most successful characters, Den Watts (Leslie Grantham). Producer Mike Gibbon was given the task of running the show, and he enlisted the most experienced writers to take over the storylining of the programme, including Charlie Humphreys, Jane Hollowood and Tony McHale.

According to Brake, the departure of two of the soap's most popular characters, Den and Angie Watts (Anita Dobson), left a void in the programme, which needed to be filled. In addition, several other long-running characters left the show that year, including Sue and Ali Osman (Sandy Ratcliff and Nejdet Salih) and their family; Donna Ludlow (Matilda Ziegler); Carmel Jackson (Judith Jacob) and Colin Russell (Michael Cashman). Brake indicated that the production team decided that 1989 was to be a year of change in Walford, commenting, "it was almost as if Walford itself was making a fresh start".

By the end of 1989, EastEnders had acquired a new executive producer, Michael Ferguson, who had previously been a successful producer on ITV's The Bill. Brake suggested that Ferguson was responsible for bringing in a new sense of vitality and creating a programme that was more in touch with the real world than it had been over the previous year.

=== Changes in the 1990s ===
A new era began in 1990, with the introduction of Phil Mitchell (Steve McFadden) and Grant Mitchell (Ross Kemp)—the Mitchell brothers—successful characters who would go on to dominate the soap thereafter. As the new production team cleared the way for new characters and a new direction, all of the characters introduced under Gibbon were axed from the show at the start of the year. Ferguson introduced other characters and was responsible for storylines including HIV, Alzheimer's disease and murder. After a successful revamp of the soap, Ferguson decided to leave EastEnders in July 1991. Ferguson was succeeded by both Leonard Lewis and Helen Greaves, who initially shared the role as executive producer. Lewis and Greaves formulated a new regime for EastEnders, giving the writers of the serial more authority in storyline progression, with the script department providing "guidance rather than prescriptive episode storylines". By the end of 1992, Greaves had left, and Lewis became executive and series producer. He left EastEnders in 1994 after the BBC controllers demanded an extra episode a week, taking its weekly airtime from 60 to 90 minutes. Lewis felt that producing an hour of "reasonable quality drama" a week was the maximum that any broadcasting system could generate without loss of integrity. Having set up the transition to the new schedule, the first trio of episodes—dubbed The Vic siege—marked Lewis's departure from the programme. Barbara Emile then became the executive producer of EastEnders, remaining with EastEnders until early 1995. She was succeeded by Corinne Hollingworth.

Hollingworth's contributions to the soap were awarded in 1997 when EastEnders won the BAFTA for Best Drama Series. Hollingworth shared the award with the next executive producer, Jane Harris. Harris was responsible for the critically panned Ireland episodes and Cindy Beale's (Michelle Collins) attempted assassination of Ian Beale (Adam Woodyatt), which brought in an audience of 23 million in 1996, roughly four million more than Coronation Street. In 1998 Matthew Robinson was appointed as the executive producer of EastEnders. During his reign, EastEnders won the BAFTA for "Best Soap" in consecutive years 1999 and 2000 and many other awards. Robinson also earned tabloid soubriquet "Axeman of Albert Square" after sacking a large number of characters in one hit, and several more thereafter. In their place, Robinson introduced new long-running characters including Melanie Healy (Tamzin Outhwaite), Jamie Mitchell (Jack Ryder), Lisa Shaw (Lucy Benjamin), Steve Owen (Martin Kemp) and Billy Mitchell (Perry Fenwick).

=== 2000s ===
John Yorke became the executive producer of EastEnders in 2000. Yorke was given the task of introducing the soap's fourth weekly episode. He axed the majority of the Di Marco family, except Beppe di Marco (Michael Greco), and helped introduce popular characters such as the Slater family. As what Mal Young described as "two of EastEnders' most successful years", Yorke was responsible for highly rated storylines such as "Who Shot Phil?", Ethel Skinner's (Gretchen Franklin) death, Jim Branning (John Bardon) and Dot Cotton's (June Brown) marriage, Trevor Morgan's (Alex Ferns) domestic abuse of his wife Little Mo Morgan (Kacey Ainsworth), and Kat Slater's (Jessie Wallace) revelation to her daughter Zoe Slater (Michelle Ryan) that she was her mother.

In 2002, Louise Berridge succeeded Yorke as the executive producer. During her time at EastEnders, Berridge introduced popular characters such as Alfie Moon (Shane Richie), Dennis Rickman (Nigel Harman), Chrissie Watts (Tracy-Ann Oberman), Jane Beale (Laurie Brett), Stacey Slater (Lacey Turner) and the critically panned Indian Ferreira family.

Berridge was responsible for some ratings success stories, such as Alfie and Kat Slater's (Jessie Wallace) relationship, Janine Butcher (Charlie Brooks) getting her comeuppance, Trevor Morgan (Alex Ferns) and Jamie Mitchell's (Jack Ryder) death storylines and the return of one of the greatest soap icons, Den Watts (Leslie Grantham), who had been presumed dead for 14 years. His return in late 2003 was watched by more than 16 million viewers, putting EastEnders back at number one in the rating war with Coronation Street; however, other storylines, such as one about a kidney transplant involving the Ferreiras, were not well received, and although Den's return proved to be a ratings success, the British press branded the plot unrealistic and felt that it questioned the show's credibility. A severe press backlash followed after Den's actor, Leslie Grantham, was outed in an internet sex scandal, which coincided with a swift decline in viewer ratings. The scandal led to Grantham's departure from the soap, but the occasion was used to mark the 20th anniversary of EastEnders, with an episode showing Den's murder at the Queen Vic pub.

On 21 September 2004, Berridge quit as executive producer of EastEnders following continued criticism of the show. Kathleen Hutchison was swiftly appointed in her place, and was tasked with quickly turning the fortunes of the soap. During her time at the soap Hutchison axed multiple characters and reportedly ordered the rewriting of numerous scripts. Newspapers reported on employee dissatisfaction with Hutchison's tenure at EastEnders. In January 2005, Hutchison left the soap and John Yorke (who by this time, was the BBC controller of continuing drama series) took total control of the show himself and became acting executive producer for a short period, before appointing Kate Harwood to the role. Harwood stayed at EastEnders for 20 months before being promoted by the BBC. The highly anticipated return of Ross Kemp as Grant Mitchell in October 2005 proved to be a sudden major ratings success, with the first two episodes consolidating to ratings of 13.21 to 13.34 million viewers. On Friday 11 November 2005, EastEnders was the first British drama to feature a two-minute silence. This episode later went on to win British Soap Award for "Best Single Episode". In October 2006, Diederick Santer took over as executive producer. He introduced several characters to the show, including ethnic minority and homosexual characters to make the show "feel more 21st century". Santer also reintroduced past and popular characters to the programme.

On 2 March 2007, BBC signed a deal with Google to put videos on YouTube. A behind the scenes video of EastEnders, hosted by Matt Di Angelo, who played Deano Wicks on the show, was put on the site the same day, and was followed by another on 6 March 2007. In April 2007, EastEnders became available to view on mobile phones, via 3G technology, for 3, Vodafone and Orange customers. On 21 April 2007, the BBC launched a new advertising campaign using the slogan "There's more to EastEnders". The first television advert showed Dot Branning with a refugee baby, Tomas, whom she took in under the pretence of being her grandson. The second and third featured Stacey Slater and Dawn Swann, respectively. There have also been adverts in magazines and on radio.

In 2009, producers introduced a limit on the number of speaking parts in each episode due to budget cuts, with an average of 16 characters per episode. The decision was criticised by Martin McGrath of Equity, who said: "Trying to produce quality TV on the cheap is doomed to fail." The BBC responded by saying they had been working that way for some time and it had not affected the quality of the show.

=== 2010s ===
From 4 February 2010, CGI was used in the show for the first time, with the addition of computer-generated trains.

EastEnders celebrated its 25th anniversary on 19 February 2010. Santer came up with several plans to mark the occasion, including the show's first episode to be broadcast live, the second wedding between Ricky Butcher (Sid Owen) and Bianca Jackson (Patsy Palmer) and the return of Bianca's relatives, mother Carol Jackson (Lindsey Coulson), and siblings Robbie Jackson (Dean Gaffney), Sonia Fowler (Natalie Cassidy) and Billie Jackson (Devon Anderson). He told entertainment website Digital Spy, "It's really important that the feel of the week is active and exciting and not too reflective. There'll be those moments for some of our longer-serving characters that briefly reflect on themselves and how they've changed. The characters don't know that it's the 25th anniversary of anything, so it'd be absurd to contrive too many situations in which they're reflective on the past. The main engine of that week is great stories that'll get people talking." The live episode featured the death of Bradley Branning (Charlie Clements) at the conclusion of the "Who Killed Archie?" storyline, which saw Bradley's wife Stacey Slater (Lacey Turner) reveal that she was the murderer. Viewing figures peaked at 16.6 million, which was the highest viewed episode in seven years. Other events to mark the anniversary were a spin-off DVD, EastEnders: Last Tango in Walford, and an Internet spin-off, EastEnders: E20.

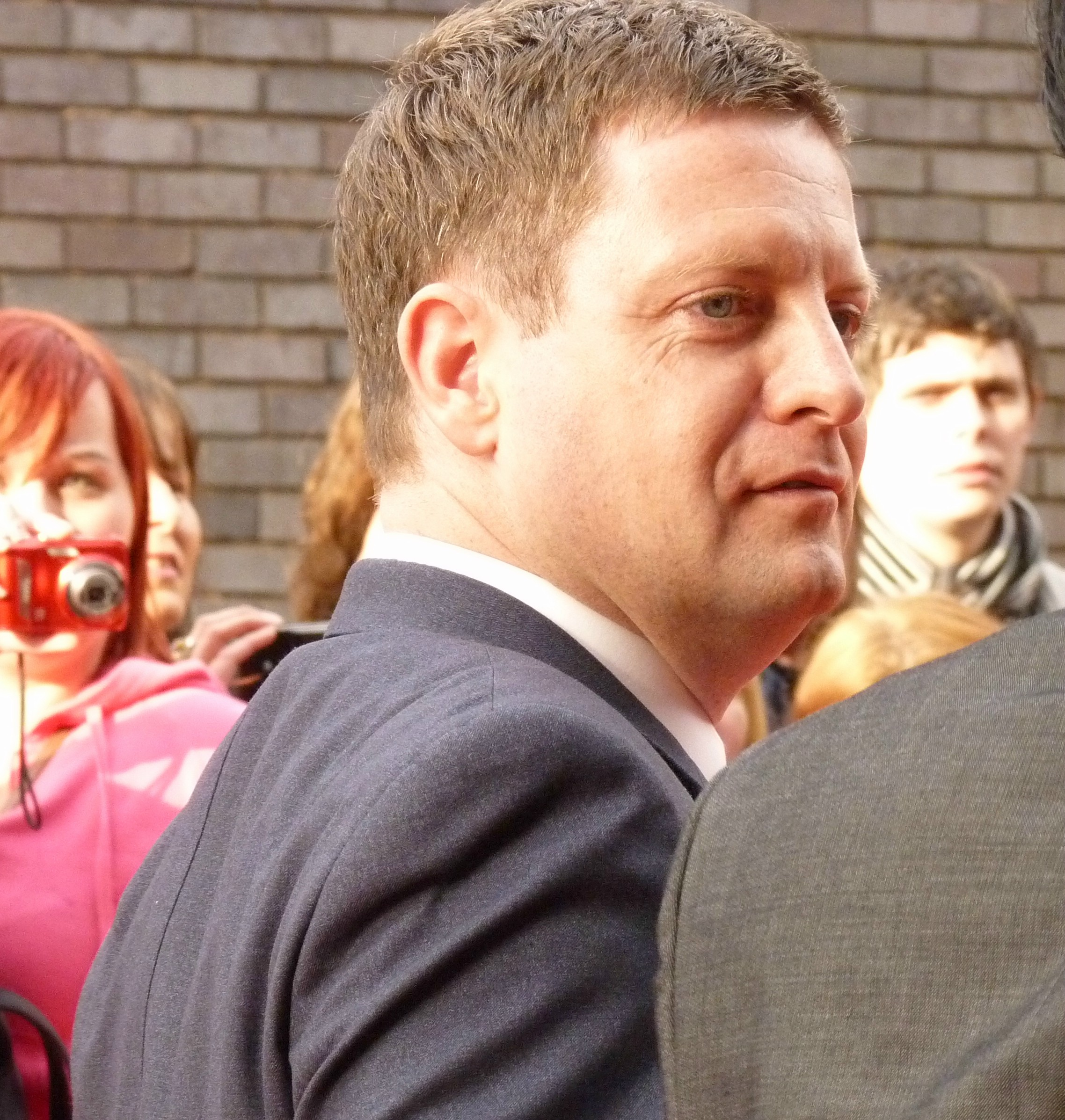
Bryan Kirkwood, executive producer (2010–2012)

Santer officially left EastEnders in March 2010, and was replaced by Bryan Kirkwood. Kirkwood's first signing was the reintroduction of characters Alfie Moon (Shane Richie) and Kat Moon (Jessie Wallace), and his first new character was Vanessa Gold, played by Zöe Lucker. In April and May 2010, Kirkwood axed eight characters from the show, Barbara Windsor left her role of Peggy Mitchell, which left a hole in the show, which Kirkwood decided to fill by bringing back Kat and Alfie, which he said would "herald the new era of EastEnders." EastEnders started broadcasting in high definition on 25 December 2010. Old sets had to be rebuilt, so The Queen Victoria set was burnt down in a storyline (and in reality) to facilitate this.

In November 2011, a storyline showed character Billy Mitchell, played by Perry Fenwick, selected to be a torch bearer for the 2012 Summer Olympics. In reality, Fenwick carried the torch through the setting of Albert Square, with live footage shown in the episode on 23 July 2012. This was the second live broadcast of EastEnders. In 2012, Kirkwood chose to leave his role as executive producer and was replaced by Lorraine Newman. The show lost many of its significant characters during this period. Newman stepped down after 16 months in the job in 2013 after the soap was criticised for its boring storylines and its lowest-ever figures pointing at around 4.8 million. Dominic Treadwell-Collins was appointed as the new executive producer on 19 August 2013 and was credited on 9 December. He axed multiple characters from the show and introduced the extended Carter family. He also introduced a long-running storyline, "Who Killed Lucy Beale?", which peaked during the show's 30th anniversary in 2015 with a week of live episodes. Treadwell-Collins announced his departure from EastEnders on 18 February 2016.

Sean O'Connor, former EastEnders series story producer and then-editor of radio soap opera The Archers, was announced to be taking over the role. Treadwell-Collins left on 6 May and O'Connor's first credited episode was broadcast on 11 July although his own creative work was not seen onscreen until late September. Additionally, Oliver Kent was brought in as the head of continuing drama series for BBC Scripted Studios, meaning that Kent would oversee EastEnders along with O'Connor. O'Connor's approach to the show was to have a firmer focus on realism, which he said was being "true to EastEnders' DNA and [finding] a way of capturing what it would be like if Julia Smith and Tony Holland were making the show now." He said that "EastEnders has always had a distinctly different tone from the other soaps but over time we've diluted our unique selling point. I think we need to be ourselves and go back to the origins of the show and what made it successful in the first place. It should be entertaining but it should also be informative—that's part of our unique BBC compact with the audience. It shouldn't just be a distraction from your own life, it should be an exploration of the life shared by the audience and the characters." O'Connor planned to stay with EastEnders until the end of 2017, but announced his departure on 23 June 2017 with immediate effect, saying he wanted to concentrate on a career in film. John Yorke returned as a temporary executive consultant. Kent said, "John Yorke is a Walford legend and I am thrilled that he will be joining us for a short period to oversee the show and to help us build on Sean's legacy while we recruit a long-term successor." Yorke initially returned for three months but his contract was later extended.

In July 2018, a special episode was aired as part of a knife crime storyline. This episode, which showed the funeral of Shakil Kazemi (Shaheen Jafargholi) interspersed with real people talking about their true-life experiences of knife crime. On 8 August 2018, it was announced that Kate Oates, who has previously been a producer on the ITV soap operas Emmerdale and Coronation Street, would become senior executive producer of EastEnders, as well as Holby City and Casualty. Oates began her role in October, and continued to work with Yorke until the end of the year to "ensure a smooth handover". It was also announced that Oates was looking for an executive producer to work under her. Jon Sen was announced on 10 December 2018 to be taking on the role.

In late 2016, popularity and viewership of EastEnders began to decline, with viewers criticising the storylines during the O'Connor reign, such as the killing of the Mitchell sisters and a storyline centred on the local bin collection. Since Yorke's and Oates's reigns, however, opinions towards the storylines have become more favourable, with storylines such as Ruby Allen's (Louisa Lytton) sexual consent, which featured a special episode which "broke new ground" and knife crime, both of which have created "vital" discussions. The soap won the award for Best Continuing Drama at the 2019 British Academy Television Awards; its first high-profile award since 2016; however, in June 2019, EastEnders suffered its lowest ever ratings of 2.4 million due to its airing at 7 pm because of the BBC's coverage of the 2019 FIFA Women's World Cup. As of 2019, the soap is one of the most watched series on BBC iPlayer and averages around 5 million viewers per episode. The soap enjoyed a record-breaking year on the streaming platform in 2019, with viewers requesting to stream or download the show 234 million times, up 10% on 2018. The Christmas Day episode in 2019 became EastEnders biggest ever episode on BBC iPlayer, with 2.14 million viewer requests.

=== 2020s ===
In February 2020, EastEnders celebrated its 35th anniversary with a stunt on the River Thames leading to the death of Dennis Rickman Jr (Bleu Landau).

It was announced on 18 March 2020 that production had been suspended on EastEnders and other BBC Studios continuing dramas in light of new government guidelines following the COVID-19 pandemic, and that broadcast of the show would be reduced to two 30-minute episodes per week, broadcast on Mondays and Tuesdays. A spokesperson confirmed that the decision was made to use up pre-shot episodes more slowly so that EastEnders could remain on-screen for longer. Two months later, Charlotte Moore, the director of content at the BBC, announced plans for a return to production. She confirmed that EastEnders would return to filming during June 2020 and that there would be a transmission break between episodes filmed before and after production paused. When production recommenced, social distancing measures were utilised and the show's cast were required to do their own hair and make-up, which is normally done by a make-up artist.

It was announced on 3 June 2020 that EastEnders would go on a transmission break following the broadcast of episode 6124 on 16 June. A behind-the-scenes show, EastEnders: Secrets From The Square, would air in the show's place during the transmission break, hosted by television personality Stacey Dooley. The first episode of the week featured exclusive interviews with the show's cast, while the second episode was a repeat of "iconic" episodes of the show. Beginning on 22 June 2020, Dooley interviewed two cast members together in the show's restaurant set while observing social distancing measures. Kate Phillips, the controller of BBC Entertainment, explained that EastEnders: Secrets From The Square would be the "perfect opportunity to celebrate the show" in the absence of the show. Jon Sen, the show's executive producer, expressed his excitement at the new series, dubbing it "a unique opportunity to see from the cast themselves just what it is like to be part of EastEnders".

Plans for the show's return to transmission were announced on 12 June 2020. It was confirmed that after the transmission break, the show would temporarily broadcast four 20-minute episodes per week, until it could return to its normal output. Sen explained that the challenges in production and filming of the show has led to the show's reduced output, but also stated that the crew had been "trialling techniques, filming methods and new ways of working" to prepare the show for its return. Filming recommenced on 29 June, with episodes airing from 7 September 2020.

On 9 April 2021, following the death of Prince Philip, Duke of Edinburgh, the episode of EastEnders that was due to be aired that night was postponed along with the final of Masterchef. In May 2021, it was announced that from 14 June 2021, boxsets of episodes would be uploaded to BBC iPlayer each Monday for three weeks. Executive producer Sen explained that the bi-annual scheduling conflicts that the UEFA European Championship and the FIFA World Cup cause to the soap, premiering four episodes on the streaming service would be beneficial for fans of the show who want to watch at their own chosen pace. Sen also confirmed that the episodes will still air on BBC One throughout the week. The release of these boxsets was extended for a further five weeks, due to similar impacts caused by the 2020 Summer Olympics.

On 12 October 2021, it was announced that EastEnders would partake in a special week-long crossover event involving multiple British soaps to promote the topic of climate change ahead of the 2021 United Nations Climate Change Conference. During the week, beginning from 1 November, a social media clip featuring Maria Connor (Samia Longchambon) from Coronation Street was featured on the programme while Cindy Cunningham (Stephanie Waring) from Hollyoaks was also referenced. Similar clips featuring the show's own characters, Bailey Baker (Kara-Leah Fernandes) and Peter Beale (Dayle Hudson), were featured on Doctors and Emmerdale during the week.

In November 2021, it was announced that Sen would step down from his role as executive producer, and would be succeeded by former story producer Chris Clenshaw. Sen's final credited episode as executive producer was broadcast on 10 March 2022 and coincided in a week of episodes that saw the arrest of serial killer Gray Atkins (Toby-Alexander Smith). From the week commencing on 7 March 2022, the show has been broadcast every weekday from Monday to Thursday in a 7:30 pm slot, making it the first time in the show's history that the programme began airing permanently on Wednesdays. On 2 June 2022, EastEnders aired an episode celebrating the Platinum Jubilee of Elizabeth II. Charles, Prince of Wales and Camilla, Duchess of Cornwall guest starred in the episode; it also marked the first executive producer credit for Clenshaw. Clenshaw's first major decision as executive producer was the axing of five series regulars: Peter Beale (Dayle Hudson), Stuart Highway (Ricky Champ), Jada Lennox (Kelsey Calladine-Smith), Dana Monroe (Barbara Smith) and Lola Pearce (Danielle Harold). Viewers criticised the decision, feeling that some of the characters had potential to add to the soap. Clenshaw has since overseen the returns of Alfie Moon (Shane Richie) and Yolande Trueman (Angela Wynter), the recast of Amy Mitchell (Ellie Dadd), as well as the reintroduction of Cindy Beale (Michelle Collins), who returned from the dead after 25 years. Public opinion on Clenshaw then changed and he has been credited for improving ratings and garnering critical acclaim for the soap, with EastEnders winning the award for Best British Soap at the 2023 British Soap Awards and the award for Serial Drama at the 28th National Television Awards under his leadership.

On 26 September 2024, it was announced Clenshaw would step down as series executive producer in February 2025, following the soap's 40th anniversary; Ben Wadey was announced as his successor. Clenshaw's final credited episode aired 13 June, followed by Wadey's debut on 16 June 2025. Wadey's initial decisions at the head of the show have included the reintroduction of Zoe Slater (Michelle Ryan) and Oscar Branning (Pierre Moullier), as well as axing Felix Baker (Matthew James Morrison), Bernadette Taylor (Clair Norris), Freddie Slater (Bobby Brazier) and Anna Knight (Molly Rainford).

== Setting ==
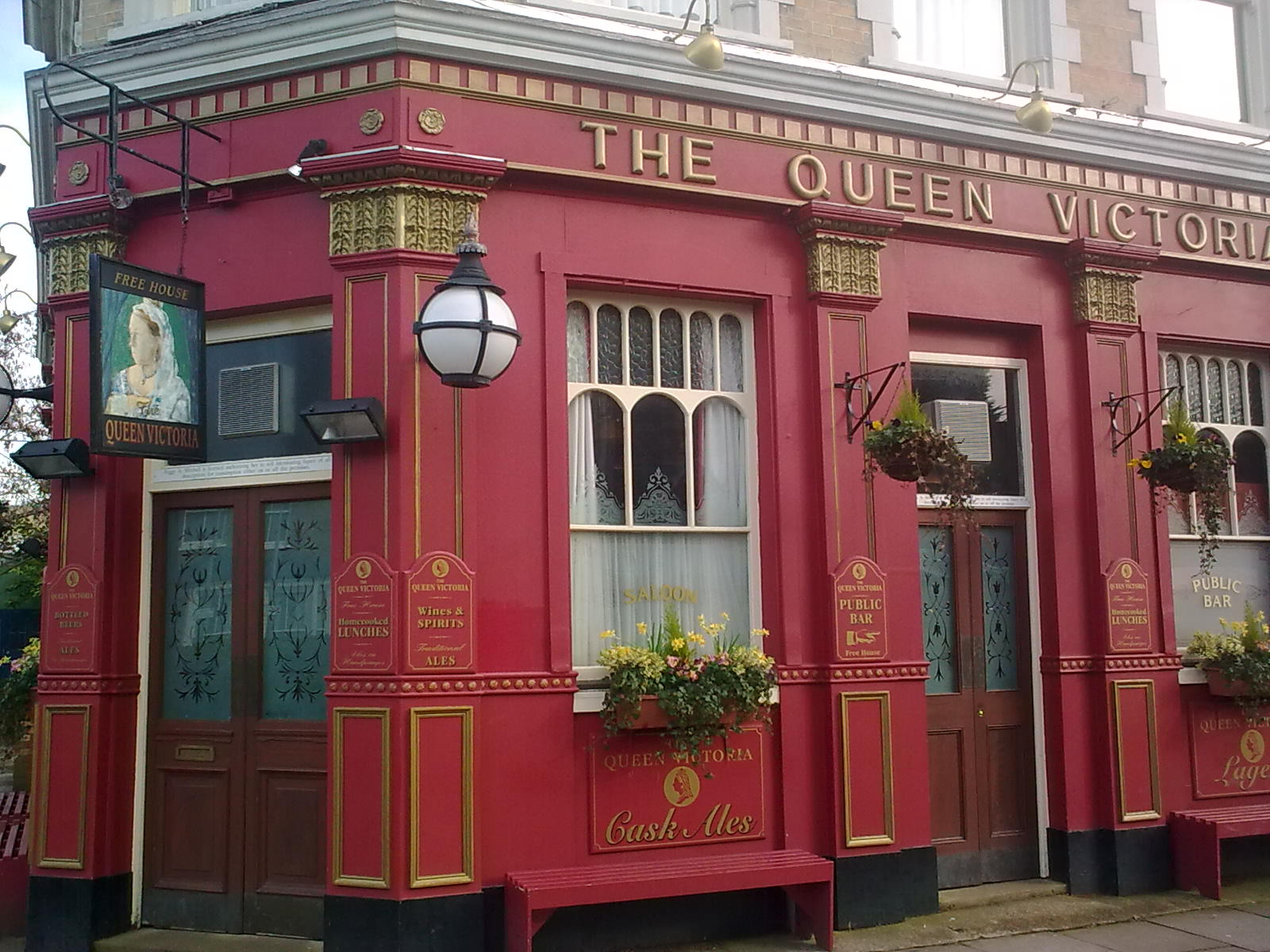
The Queen Victoria Public House (as it looked from November 1992 to September 2010) is the main focal point of Albert Square.

The central focus of EastEnders is the fictional Victorian square Albert Square in the fictional London Borough of Walford. In the show's narrative, Albert Square is a 19th-century street, named after Prince Albert (1819–1861), the husband of Queen Victoria (1819–1901, reigned 1837–1901). Thus, central to Albert Square is the Queen Victoria pub (also known as the Queen Vic or the Vic). The show's producers based the square's design on Fassett Square in Dalston. There is also a market close to Fassett Square at Ridley Road. The postcode for the area, E8, was one of the working titles for the series. The name Walford is both a street in Dalston where Tony Holland lived and a blend of Walthamstow and Stratford—the areas of Greater London where the creators were born. Other parts of the square and set interiors are based on other locations. The railway bridge is based upon one near BBC Television Centre which carries the Hammersmith & City line over Wood Lane W12, and the Queen Vic on the former College Park Hotel pub in Willesden at the end of Scrubs Lane at the junction with Harrow Road NW10 just a couple of miles from BBC Television Centre. The current residents of the Queen Victoria Public House are landlady Kat Moon (Jessie Wallace) and husband Alfie Moon (Shane Richie) as landlord.

Walford East is a fictional London Underground station for Walford, and a tube map that was first seen on air in 1996 showed Walford East between Bow Road and West Ham, in the actual location of Bromley-by-Bow on the District and Hammersmith & City lines.

Walford has the postal district of E20. It was named as if Walford were part of the actual E postcode area which covers much of east London, the E standing for Eastern. E20 was entirely fictional when it was created, as London East postal districts stopped at E18 at the time. The show's creators opted for E20 instead of E19 as it was thought to sound better.

In March 2011, Royal Mail allocated the E20 postal district to the 2012 Olympic Park. In September 2011, the postcode for Albert Square was revealed in an episode as E20 6PQ.

== Characters ==
EastEnders is built around the idea of relationships and strong families, with each character having a place in the community. This theme encompasses the whole square, making the entire community a family of sorts, prey to upsets and conflict, but pulling together in times of trouble. Co-creator Tony Holland was from a large East End family, and such families have typified EastEnders. The first central family was the combination of the Fowler family, consisting of Pauline Fowler (Wendy Richard), her husband Arthur (Bill Treacher), and teenage children Mark (David Scarboro/Todd Carty) and Michelle (Susan Tully). Pauline's family, the Beales, consisted of Pauline's twin brother Pete Beale (Peter Dean), his wife Kathy (Gillian Taylforth) and their teenage son Ian (Adam Woodyatt). Pauline and Pete's domineering mother Lou Beale (Anna Wing) lived with Pauline and her family. Holland drew on the names of his own family for the characters.

The Watts and Mitchell families have been central to many notable EastEnders storylines, the show having been dominated by the Watts in the 1980s, with the 1990s focusing on the Mitchells and Butchers. The early 2000s saw a shift in attention towards the newly introduced female Slater clan, before a renewal of emphasis upon the restored Watts family beginning in 2003. In 2006, EastEnders became largely dominated by the Mitchell, Masood and Branning families. However, the early 2010s also saw a renewed focus on the Moon and Slater family; further, from 2013 onwards, the Carters were a prominent family. In 2016, the Fowlers were revived and merged with the Slaters, with Martin Fowler (James Bye) marrying Stacey Slater (Lacey Turner). The late 2010s saw the newly introduced Taylor family become central to the show's main storylines, and in 2019, the first Sikh family, the Panesars, were introduced. The early 2020s was dominated by the Mitchells, Brannings, Panesars, Slaters, as well as the newly introduced Knight family. Key people involved in the production of EastEnders have stressed how important the idea of strong families is to the programme.

EastEnders has an emphasis on strong family matriarchs, with examples including Pauline Fowler (Wendy Richard) and Peggy Mitchell (Barbara Windsor), helping to attract a female audience. John Yorke, the former BBC's head of drama production, put this down to Tony Holland's "gay sensibility, which showed a love for strong women". The matriarchal role is one that has been seen in various reincarnations since the programme's inception, often depicted as the centre of the family unit. The original matriarch was Lou Beale (Anna Wing), though later examples include Mo Harris (Laila Morse), Pat Butcher (Pam St Clement), Zainab Masood (Nina Wadia), Cora Cross (Ann Mitchell), Kathy Beale (Gillian Taylforth), Jean Slater (Gillian Wright), and Suki Panesar (Balvinder Sopal). These characters are often seen as being loud and interfering but most importantly, responsible for the well-being of the family.

The show often includes strong, brassy, long-suffering women who exhibit diva-like behaviour and stoically battle through an array of tragedy and misfortune. Such characters include Angie Watts (Anita Dobson), Kathy Beale (Gillian Taylforth), Sharon Watts (Letitia Dean), Pat Butcher (Pam St Clement), Peggy Mitchell (Barbara Windsor), Kat Slater (Jessie Wallace), Denise Fox (Diane Parish), Tanya Branning (Jo Joyner) and Linda Carter (Kellie Bright). Conversely there are female characters who handle tragedy less well, depicted as eternal victims and endless sufferers; examples include Ronnie Mitchell (Samantha Womack), Little Mo Mitchell (Kacey Ainsworth), Whitney Dean (Shona McGarty), Laura Beale (Hannah Waterman), Sue Osman (Sandy Ratcliff), Lisa Fowler (Lucy Benjamin), Mel Owen (Tamzin Outhwaite) and Rainie Cross (Tanya Franks). The "tart with a heart" is another recurring character. Often, their promiscuity masks a hidden vulnerability and a desire to be loved. Such characters have included Pat Butcher (Pam St Clement), Tiffany Mitchell (Martine McCutcheon), Kat Slater (Jessie Wallace), Dawn Swann (Kara Tointon) and Priya Nandra-Hart (Sophie Khan Levy).

A gender balance in the show is maintained via the inclusion of various "macho" male personalities such as Phil Mitchell (Steve McFadden), Grant Mitchell (Ross Kemp), Dan Sullivan (Craig Fairbrass), and George Knight (Colin Salmon), "bad boys" such as Den Watts (Leslie Grantham), Sean Slater (Robert Kazinsky), Michael Moon (Steve John Shepherd), Derek Branning (Jamie Foreman), Vincent Hubbard (Richard Blackwood), and Ravi Gulati (Aaron Thiara) and "heartthrobs" such as Simon Wicks (Nick Berry), Joe Wicks (Paul Nicholls), Jamie Mitchell (Jack Ryder), Dennis Rickman (Nigel Harman), Joey Branning (David Witts), Kush Kazemi (Davood Ghadami) and Zack Hudson (James Farrar). Another recurring male character type is the smartly dressed businessman, often involved in gang culture and crime and seen as a local authority figure. Examples include Steve Owen (Martin Kemp), Jack Dalton (Hywel Bennett), Andy Hunter (Michael Higgs), Johnny Allen (Billy Murray), Derek Branning (Jamie Foreman), and Nish Panesar (Navin Chowdhry). Following criticism aimed at the show's over-emphasis on "gangsters" in 2005, such characters have been significantly reduced. Another recurring male character seen in EastEnders is the "loser" or "soft touch", males often comically under the thumb of their female counterparts, which have included Arthur Fowler (Bill Treacher), Ricky Butcher (Sid Owen), Garry Hobbs (Ricky Groves), Lofty Holloway (Tom Watt), Billy Mitchell (Perry Fenwick) and Howie Danes (Delroy Atkinson).

Other recurring character types that have appeared throughout the serial are "cheeky-chappies" Pete Beale (Peter Dean), Alfie Moon (Shane Richie), Garry Hobbs (Ricky Groves) and Kush Kazemi (Davood Ghadami), "lost girls" such as Mary Smith (Linda Davidson), Donna Ludlow (Matilda Ziegler), Mandy Salter (Nicola Stapleton), Janine Butcher (Charlie Brooks), Zoe Slater (Michelle Ryan), Whitney Dean (Shona McGarty), and Hayley Slater (Katie Jarvis), delinquents such as Stacey Slater (Lacey Turner), Jay Brown (Jamie Borthwick), Lola Pearce (Danielle Harold), Bobby Beale (Eliot Carrington/Clay Milner Russell) and Keegan Baker (Zack Morris), "villains" such as Nick Cotton (John Altman), Trevor Morgan (Alex Ferns), May Wright (Amanda Drew), Yusef Khan (Ace Bhatti), Archie Mitchell (Larry Lamb), Dean Wicks (Matt Di Angelo), Stuart Highway (Ricky Champ) and Gray Atkins (Toby-Alexander Smith), "bitches" such as Cindy Beale (Michelle Collins), Janine Butcher (Charlie Brooks), Chrissie Watts (Tracy-Ann Oberman), Lucy Beale (Melissa Suffield/Hetti Bywater), Abi Branning (Lorna Fitzgerald), Babe Smith (Annette Badland), Suki Panesar (Balvinder Sopal) and Nicola Mitchell (Laura Doddington), "brawlers" or "fighters" such as Mary Smith (Linda Davidson), Bianca Jackson (Patsy Palmer), Kat Slater (Jessie Wallace), Shirley Carter (Linda Henry), Chelsea Fox (Zaarah Abrahams) and Priya Nandra-Hart (Sophie Khan Levy), and cockney "wide boys" or "wheeler dealers" such as Frank Butcher (Mike Reid), Alfie Moon (Shane Richie), Kevin Wicks (Phil Daniels), Darren Miller (Charlie G. Hawkins), Fatboy (Ricky Norwood), Jay Brown (Jamie Borthwick), Kheerat Panesar (Jaz Deol) and Tom "Rocky" Cotton (Brian Conley).

Over the years, EastEnders has typically featured a number of elderly residents, who are used to show vulnerability, nostalgia, stalwart-like attributes and are sometimes used for comedic purposes. The original elderly residents included Lou Beale (Anna Wing), Ethel Skinner (Gretchen Franklin) and Dot Cotton (June Brown). Over the years, they have been joined by the likes of Mo Butcher (Edna Doré), Jules Tavernier (Tommy Eytle), Marge Green (Pat Coombs), Nellie Ellis (Elizabeth Kelly), Jim Branning (John Bardon), Charlie Slater (Derek Martin), Mo Harris (Laila Morse), Patrick Trueman (Rudolph Walker), Cora Cross (Ann Mitchell), Les Coker (Roger Sloman), Rose Cotton (Polly Perkins), Pam Coker (Lin Blakley), Stan Carter (Timothy West), Babe Smith (Annette Badland), Claudette Hubbard (Ellen Thomas), Sylvie Carter (Linda Marlowe), Ted Murray (Christopher Timothy), Joyce Murray (Maggie Steed), Arshad Ahmed (Madhav Sharma), Mariam Ahmed (Indira Joshi) and Vi Highway (Gwen Taylor). The programme has more recently included a higher number of teenagers and successful young adults in a bid to capture the younger television audience. This has spurred criticism, most notably from the actress Anna Wing, who portrayed Lou Beale in the show. She commented, "I don't want to be disloyal, but I think you need a few mature people in a soap because they give it backbone and body... if all the main people are young it gets a bit thin and inexperienced. It gets too lightweight."

EastEnders has been known to feature a "comedy double-act", originally demonstrated with the characters of Dot and Ethel, whose friendship was one of the serial's most enduring. Other examples include Paul Priestly (Mark Thrippleton) and Trevor Short (Phil McDermott). In 1989 especially, characters were brought in who were deliberately conceived as comic or light-hearted. Such characters included Julie Cooper (Louise Plowright)—a brassy maneater; Marge Green—a batty older lady played by veteran comedy actress Pat Coombs; Trevor Short (Phil McDermott)—the "village idiot"; his friend, northern heartbreaker Paul Priestly (Mark Thrippleton); wheeler-dealer Vince Johnson (Hepburn Graham); and Laurie Bates (Gary Powell), who became Pete Beale's (Peter Dean) sparring partner. The majority of EastEnders' characters are working-class. Middle-class characters do occasionally become regulars, but have been less successful and rarely become long-term characters. In the main, middle-class characters exist as villains, such as James Willmott-Brown (William Boyde), May Wright (Amanda Drew), Stella Crawford (Sophie Thompson), Yusef Khan (Ace Bhatti) and Gray Atkins (Toby-Alexander Smith), or are used to promote positive liberal influences, such as Colin Russell (Michael Cashman), Rachel Kominski (Jacquetta May) and Derek Harkinson (Ian Lavender).

EastEnders has always featured a culturally diverse cast which has included black, Asian, Turkish, Polish and Latvian characters. "The expansion of minority representation signals a move away from the traditional soap opera format, providing more opportunities for audience identification with the characters and hence a wider appeal". Despite this, the programme has been criticised by the Commission for Racial Equality, which argued in 2002 that EastEnders was not giving a realistic representation of the East End's "ethnic make-up". It suggested that the average proportion of visible minority faces on EastEnders was substantially lower than the actual ethnic minority population in East London boroughs, and it, therefore, reflected the East End in the 1960s, not the East End of the 2000s. The programme has since attempted to address these issues. A sari shop was opened and various characters of different ethnicities were introduced throughout 2006 and 2007, including the Fox family, the Ahmeds, and various background artists. This was part of producer Diederick Santer's plan to "diversify", to make EastEnders "feel more 21st century". EastEnders has had varying success with ethnic minority characters. Possibly the least successful were the Indian Ferreira family, who were not well received by critics or viewers and were dismissed as unrealistic by the Asian community in the UK.

EastEnders has been praised for its portrayal of characters with disabilities, including Adam Best (David Proud) (spina bifida), Noah Chambers (Micah Thomas) and Frankie Lewis (Rose Ayling-Ellis) (deaf), Jean Slater (Gillian Wright) and her daughter Stacey (Lacey Turner) (bipolar disorder), Janet Mitchell (Grace) (Down syndrome), Jim Branning (John Bardon) (stroke) and Dinah Wilson (Anjela Lauren Smith) (multiple sclerosis). The show also features a large number of gay, lesbian and bisexual characters (see list of soap operas with LGBT characters), including Colin Russell (Michael Cashman), Barry Clark (Gary Hailes), Simon Raymond (Andrew Lynford), Tony Hills (Mark Homer), Sonia Fowler (Natalie Cassidy), Naomi Julien (Petra Letang), Tina Carter (Luisa Bradshaw-White), Tosh Mackintosh (Rebecca Scroggs), Christian Clarke (John Partridge), Syed Masood (Marc Elliott), Ben Mitchell (Harry Reid/Max Bowden), Paul Coker (Jonny Labey), Iqra Ahmed (Priya Davdra), Ash Panesar (Gurlaine Kaur Garcha), Bernadette Taylor (Clair Norris), Callum Highway (Tony Clay) and Eve Unwin (Heather Peace). Kyle Slater (Riley Carter Millington), a transgender character, was introduced in 2015.

EastEnders has a high cast turnover and characters are regularly changed to facilitate storylines or refresh the format. The show has also become known for the return of characters after they have left the show. Sharon Watts (Letitia Dean) returned in August 2012 for her third stint on the show. Den Watts (Leslie Grantham) returned, 14 years after he was believed to have died, in September 2003, a feat repeated by Kathy Beale (Gillian Taylforth) in 2015, and Cindy Beale (Michelle Collins) in 2023. Speaking extras, including Tracey the barmaid (Jane Slaughter) (who has been in the show since the first episode in 1985), have made appearances throughout the show's duration without being the focus of any major storylines. The character of Nick Cotton (John Altman) gained a reputation for making constant exits and returns since the programme's first year until the character died in 2015.

As of 2026, Gillian Taylforth, Letitia Dean and Adam Woodyatt are the only members of the original cast remaining in the show, in their roles of Kathy Beale, Sharon Watts and Ian Beale respectively. Tracey is the longest-serving female character in the show, having appeared since 1985, albeit as a minor character.

== Storylines ==
EastEnders programme makers took the decision that the show was to be about "everyday life" in the inner city "today" and regarded it as a "slice of life". Creator/producer Julia Smith declared that "We don't make life, we reflect it". She also said, "We decided to go for a realistic, fairly outspoken type of drama which could encompass stories about homosexuality, rape, unemployment, racial prejudice, etc., in a believable context. Above all, we wanted realism". In 2011, the head of BBC drama, John Yorke, said that the real East End had changed significantly since EastEnders started, and the show no longer truly reflected real life, but that it had an "emotional truthfulness" and was partly "true to the original vision" and partly "adapt[ing] to a changing world", adding that "If it was a show where every house cost a fortune and everyone drove a Lexus, it wouldn't be EastEnders. You have to show shades of that change, but certain things are immutable, I would argue, like The Vic and the market."

In the 1980s, EastEnders featured "gritty" storylines involving drugs and crime, representing the issues faced by working-class Britain under Thatcherism. Storylines included the cot death of 14-month-old Hassan Osman, Nick Cotton's (John Altman) homophobia, racism and murder of Reg Cox (Johnnie Clayton), Arthur Fowler's (Bill Treacher) unemployment reflecting the recession of the 1980s, the rape of Kathy Beale (Gillian Taylforth) in 1988 by James Willmott-Brown (William Boyde) and Michelle Fowler's (Susan Tully) teenage pregnancy. The show also dealt with prostitution, mixed-race relationships, shoplifting, sexism, divorce, domestic violence and mugging. In 1989, the programme came under criticism in the British media for being too depressing, and according to writer Colin Brake, the programme makers were determined to change this. In 1989, there was a deliberate attempt to increase the lighter, more comic aspects of life in Albert Square. This led to the introduction of some characters who were deliberately conceived as comic or light-hearted. Brake suggested that humour was an important element in EastEnders' storylines during 1989, with a greater amount of slapstick and light comedy than before. He classed 1989's changes as a brave experiment, and suggested that while some found this period of EastEnders entertaining, many other viewers felt that the comedy stretched the programme's credibility. Although the programme still covered many issues in 1989, such as domestic violence, drugs, rape and racism, Brake reflected that the new emphasis on a more balanced mix between "light and heavy storylines" gave the illusion that the show had lost a "certain edge".

As the show progressed into the 1990s, EastEnders still featured hard-hitting issues such as Mark Fowler (Todd Carty) revealing he was HIV positive in 1991, the death of his wife Gill (Susanna Dawson) from an AIDS-related illness in 1992, murder, adoption, abortion, Peggy Mitchell's (Barbara Windsor) battle with breast cancer, and Phil Mitchell's (Steve McFadden) alcoholism and violence towards wife Kathy. Mental health issues were confronted in 1996 when 16-year-old Joe Wicks developed schizophrenia following the off-screen death of his sister in a car crash. The long-running storyline of Mark Fowler's HIV was so successful in raising awareness that in 1999, a survey by the National Aids Trust found teenagers got most of their information about HIV from the soap, though one campaigner noted that in some ways the storyline was not reflective of what was happening at the time as the condition was more common among the gay community. Still, heterosexual Mark struggled with various issues connected to his HIV status, including public fears of contamination, a marriage breakdown connected to his inability to have children and the side effects of combination therapies.

In the early 2000s, EastEnders covered the issue of euthanasia with Ethel Skinner's (Gretchen Franklin) death in a pact with her friend Dot Cotton (June Brown), the unveiling of Kat Slater's (Jessie Wallace) sexual abuse by her uncle Harry (Michael Elphick) as a child (which led to the birth of her daughter Zoe (Michelle Ryan), who had been brought up to believe that Kat was her sister), the domestic abuse of Little Mo Morgan (Kacey Ainsworth) by husband Trevor (Alex Ferns) (which involved marital rape and culminated in Trevor's death after he tried to kill Little Mo in a fire), Sonia Jackson (Natalie Cassidy) giving birth at the age of 15 and then putting her baby up for adoption, and Janine Butcher's (Charlie Brooks) prostitution, agoraphobia and drug addiction. The soap also tackled the issue of mental illness and carers of people who have mental conditions, illustrated with mother and daughter Jean (Gillian Wright) and Stacey Slater (Lacey Turner); Jean has bipolar disorder, and teenage daughter Stacey was her carer (this storyline won a Mental Health Media Award in September 2006). Stacey went on to struggle with the disorder herself. The issue of illiteracy was highlighted by the characters of middle-aged Keith (David Spinx) and his young son Darren (Charlie G. Hawkins). EastEnders has also covered the issue of Down syndrome, as Billy (Perry Fenwick) and Honey Mitchell's (Emma Barton) baby, Janet Mitchell (Grace), was born with the condition in 2006. EastEnders covered child abuse with its storyline involving Phil Mitchell's (Steve McFadden) 11-year-old son Ben (Charlie Jones) and lawyer girlfriend Stella Crawford (Sophie Thompson), and child grooming involving the characters Tony King (Chris Coghill) as the perpetrator and Whitney Dean (Shona McGarty) as the victim.

Aside from this, soap opera staples of youthful romance, jealousy, domestic rivalry, gossip and extramarital affairs are regularly featured, with high-profile storylines occurring several times a year. Whodunits also feature regularly, including the "Who Shot Phil?" story arc in 2001 that attracted more than 19 million viewers and was one of the biggest successes in British soap television; the "Who Killed Archie?" storyline, which was revealed in a special live episode of the show that drew a peak of 17 million viewers; and the "Who Killed Lucy Beale?" saga. The most recent whodunit happened at Christmas 2023, where The Six storyline saw Keanu Taylor (Danny Walters) be murdered by Linda Carter (Kellie Bright), and covered up by five other residents present that night.

== Production ==
=== Set ===
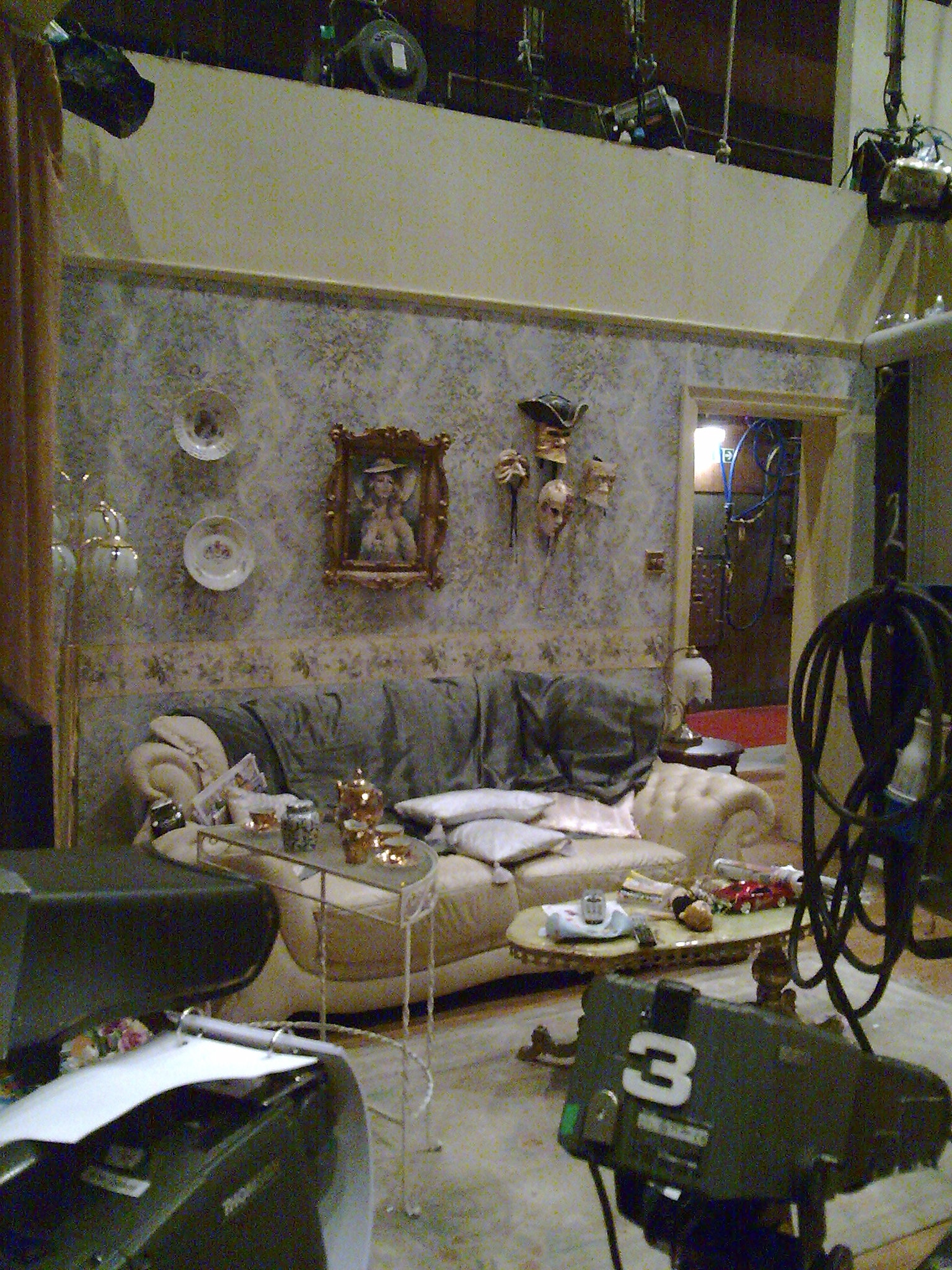
The Butcher/Jackson living room in 2008

The exterior set for the fictional Albert Square is located in the permanent backlot of the BBC Elstree Centre, Borehamwood, Hertfordshire, at 51°39′32″N 0°16′40″W, and is outdoors and open to the weather. It was initially built in 1984 with a specification that it should last for at least 15 years at a cost of £750,000. The EastEnders lot was designed by Keith Harris, who was a senior designer within the production team together with supervising art directors Peter Findley and Gina Parr. The main buildings on the square consisted originally of hollow shells, constructed from marine plywood facades mounted onto steel frames. The lower walls, pavements, etc., were constructed of real brick and tarmac. The set had to be made to look as if it had been standing for years. This was done by a number of means, including chipping the pavements, using chemicals to crack the top layer of the paint work, using varnish to create damp patches underneath the railway bridge, and making garden walls in such a way they appeared to sag. The final touches were added in summer 1984; these included a telephone box, telegraph pole that was provided by British Telecom, lampposts that were provided by Hertsmere Borough Council and a number of vehicles parked on the square. All the appliances on each set are fully functional, such as gas cookers, the laundry washing machines and The Queen Victoria beer pumps.

The walls were intentionally built crooked to give them an aged appearance. The drains around the set are real so rainwater can naturally flow from the streets. The square was built in two phases with only three sides being built, plus Bridge Street, to begin with in 1984, in time to be used for the show's first episode. Then in 1986, Harris added an extension to the set, building the fourth side of Albert Square, and in 1987, Turpin Road began to be featured more, which included buildings such as The Dagmar.

In 1993, George Street was added, and soon after Walford East Underground station was built, to create further locations when EastEnders went from two to three episodes per week. The set was constructed by the BBC in-house construction department under construction manager Mike Hagan. Most of the buildings on Albert Square have no interior filming space, with a few exceptions, and most do not have rears or gardens. Some interior shots are filmed in the actual buildings.

In February 2008, it was reported that the set would transfer to Pinewood Studios in Buckinghamshire, where a new set would be built as the set was looking "shabby", with its flaws showing up on high-definition television broadcasts; however, by April 2010 a follow-up report confirmed that Albert Square would remain at Elstree Studios for at least another four years, taking the set through its 25th anniversary. The set was consequently rebuilt for high definition on the same site, using mostly real brick with some areas using a new improved plastic brick. Throughout rebuilding filming would still take place, and so scaffolding was often seen on screen during the process, with some storylines written to accommodate the rebuilding, such as the Queen Vic fire.

In 2014, then executive producer Dominic Treadwell-Collins said that he wanted Albert Square to look like a real-life east London neighbourhood so that the soap would "better reflect the more fashionable areas of east London beloved of young professionals" giving a flavour of the "creeping gentrification" of east London. He added: "It should feel more like London. It's been frozen in aspic for too long." The BBC announced that it would rebuild the EastEnders set to secure the long-term future of the show, with completion expected to be in 2018. The set would provide a modern, upgraded exterior filming resource for EastEnders, and copy the appearance of the existing buildings; however, it would be 20 per cent bigger, in order to enable greater editorial ambition and improve working conditions for staff. A temporary set would be created on-site to enable filming to continue while the permanent structure was rebuilt.

In May 2016, the rebuild was delayed until 2020, and forecast to cost in excess of £15 million, although the main part of the set was scheduled to be able to start filming in May 2019. In December 2018, it was revealed that the new set was now planned to cost £59 million but a National Audit Office (NAO) report stated that it would actually cost £86.7 million and be completed two-and-a-half years later than planned, in 2023; the NAO concluded that the BBC "could not provide value for money on the project". The NAO's forecast cost was more than the annual combined budget for BBC Radio 1 and Radio 2. The BBC said the new set would be more suitable for HD filming, and better reflect the modern East End of London. In March 2019 there was criticism from a group of MPs about how the BBC handled the redevelopment of the set. In March 2020, during the suspension of filming, the interior sets were used for a new adaptation of Talking Heads. This marked the first time that it had been used for anything other than EastEnders. In January 2022, the new £86.7m exterior set was officially unveiled by the BBC, replacing the original set built in 1984. The new scenes from the new set first appeared in episodes airing in spring that year.

=== Filming ===
The majority of EastEnders episodes are filmed at the BBC Elstree Centre in Borehamwood, Hertfordshire. In January 1987, EastEnders had three production teams each comprising a director, production manager, production assistant and assistant floor manager. Other permanent staff included the producer's office, script department and designer, meaning between 30 and 35 people would be working full-time on EastEnders, rising to 60 to 70 on filming days. When the number of episodes was increased to four per week, more studio space was needed, so Top of the Pops was moved from its studio at Elstree to BBC Television Centre in April 2001. Episodes are produced in "quartets" of four episodes, each of which starts filming on a Tuesday and takes nine days to record. Each day, between 25 and 30 scenes are recorded. During the filming week, actors can film for as many as eight to 12 episodes. Exterior scenes are filmed on a specially constructed film lot, and interior scenes take place in six studios. The episodes are usually filmed about six to eight weeks in advance of broadcast. During the winter period, filming can take place up to 12 weeks in advance, due to less daylight for outdoor filming sessions. This time difference has been known to cause problems when filming outdoor scenes. On 8 February 2007, heavy snow fell on the set and filming had to be cancelled as the scenes due to be filmed on the day were to be transmitted in April. EastEnders is normally recorded using four cameras. When a quartet is completed, it is edited by the director, videotape editor and script supervisor. The producer then reviews the edits and decides if anything needs to be re-edited, which the director will do. A week later, sound is added to the episodes and they are technically reviewed, and are ready for transmission if they are deemed of acceptable quality.

Although episodes are predominantly recorded weeks before they are broadcast, occasionally, EastEnders includes current events. In 1987, EastEnders covered the general election. Using a plan devised by co-creators Smith and Holland, five minutes of material was cut from four of the pre-recorded episodes preceding the election. These were replaced by specially recorded election material, including representatives from each major party, and a scene recorded on the day after the election reflecting the result, which was broadcast the following Tuesday. The result of the 2010 general election was referenced on 7 May 2010 episode. During the 2006 FIFA World Cup, actors filmed short scenes following the tournament's events that were edited into the programme in the following episode. Last-minute scenes have also been recorded to reference the 50th anniversary of the end of the Second World War in 1995, the two-minute silence on Remembrance Day 2005 (2005 also being the year for the 60th anniversary of the end of the Second World War and the 200th anniversary of the Battle of Trafalgar), Barack Obama's election victory in 2008, the death of Michael Jackson in 2009, the 2010 Comprehensive Spending Review, Andy Murray winning the men's singles at the 2013 Wimbledon Championships, the wedding of Prince William and Catherine Middleton, the birth of Prince George of Wales, Scotland voting no against independence in 2014, and the 100th anniversary of the beginning of the First World War.

EastEnders is often filmed on location, away from the studios in Borehamwood. Sometimes an entire quartet is filmed on location, which has a practical function and are the result of EastEnders making a "double bank", when an extra week's worth of episodes are recorded at the same time as the regular schedule, enabling the production of the programme to stop for a two-week break at Christmas. These episodes often air in late June or early July and again in late October or early November. The first time this happened was in December 1985 when Pauline (Wendy Richard) and Arthur Fowler (Bill Treacher) travelled to the Southend-on-Sea to find their son Mark, who had run away from home. In 1986, EastEnders filmed overseas for the first time, in Venice, and this was also the first time it was not shot on videotape, as a union rule at the time prevented producers taking a video crew abroad and a film crew had to be used instead. In 2011, it was reported that eight per cent of the series is filmed on location.

If scenes during a normal week are to be filmed on location, this is done during the normal recording week. Off-set locations that have been used for filming include Clacton (1989), Devon (September 1990), Hertfordshire (used for scenes set in Gretna Green in July 1991), Portsmouth (November 1991), Milan (1997), Ireland (1997), Amsterdam (December 1999), Brighton (2001) and Portugal (2003). In 2003, filming took place at Loch Fyne Hotel and Leisure Club in Inveraray, The Arkinglass Estate in Cairndow and Grims Dyke Hotel, Harrow Weald, north London, for a week of episodes set in Scotland. The episode shown on 9 April 2007 featured scenes filmed at St Giles Church and The Blacksmiths Arms public house in Wormshill, the Ringlestone Inn, two miles away and Court Lodge Farm in Stansted, Kent. and the Port of Dover, Kent. .

Other locations have included the court house, a disused office block, Evershed House, and St Peter's Church, all in St Albans, an abandoned mental facility in Worthing, and a wedding dress shop in Muswell Hill, north London. A week of episodes in 2011 saw filming take place on a beach in Thorpe Bay and a pier in Southend-on-Sea—during which a stuntman was injured when a gust of wind threw him off balance and he fell onto rocks— with other scenes filmed on the Essex coast. In 2012, filming took place in Keynsham, Somerset. In January 2013, on-location filming at Grahame Park in Colindale, north London, was interrupted by at least seven youths who threw a firework at the set and threatened members of the crew. In October 2013, scenes were filmed on a road near London Southend Airport in Essex.

EastEnders has featured seven live broadcasts. For its 25th anniversary in February 2010, a live episode was broadcast in which Stacey Slater (Lacey Turner) was revealed as Archie Mitchell's (Larry Lamb) killer. Turner was told only 30 minutes before the live episode and to maintain suspense, she whispers this revelation to former lover and current father-in-law, Max Branning, in the very final moments of the live show. Many other cast members only found out at the same time as the public, when the episode was broadcast. On 23 July 2012, a segment of that evening's episode was screened live as Billy Mitchell (Perry Fenwick) carried the Olympic flame around Walford in preparation for the 2012 Summer Olympics. In February 2015, for the soap's 30th anniversary, five episodes in a week featured live inserts throughout them. Episodes airing on Tuesday 17, Wednesday 18 and Thursday 19 (which featured an hour long episode and a second episode) all featured at least one live insert. The show revealed that the killer of Lucy Beale (Hetti Bywater) was her younger brother, Bobby (Eliot Carrington), during the second episode on Thursday, after a 10-month mystery regarding who killed her. In a flashback episode which revisited the night of the murder, Bobby was revealed to have killed his sister. The aftermath episode, which aired on Friday 20, was completely live and explained in detail Lucy's death. Carrington was told he was Lucy's killer on Monday 16, while Laurie Brett (who plays Bobby's adoptive mother, Jane) was informed in November, due to the character playing a major role in the cover-up of Lucy's murder. Bywater only discovered Bobby was responsible for Lucy's death on the morning of Thursday, 19 February, several hours before they filmed the scenes revealing Bobby as Lucy's killer.

=== Post-production ===
Each episode should run for 27 minutes and 15 seconds; however, if any episode runs over or under then it is the job of post-production to cut or add scenes where appropriate. As noted in the 1994 behind-the-scenes book, EastEnders: The First 10 Years, after filming, tapes were sent to the videotape editor, who then edited the scenes together into an episode. The videotape editor used the director's notes so they knew which scenes the director wanted to appear in a particular episode. The producer might have asked for further changes to be made. The episode was then copied onto D3 video. The final process was to add the audio which included background noise such as a train or a jukebox music and to check it met the BBC's technical standard for broadcasting.

Since 2010, EastEnders no longer uses tapes in the recording or editing process. After footage is recorded, the material is sent digitally to the post-production team. The editors then assemble all the scenes recorded for the director to view and note any changes that are needed. The sound team also have the capability to access the edited episode, enabling them to dub the sound and create the final version.

=== Budgets and costs ===
According to the book How to Study Television, in 1995 EastEnders cost the BBC £40,000 per episode on average. A 2012 agreement between the BBC, the Writers' Guild of Great Britain and the Personal Managers' Association set out the pay rate for EastEnders scripts as £137.70 per minute of transmission time (£4,131 for 30 minutes), which is 85 per cent of the rate for scripts for other BBC television series. The writers would be paid 75 per cent of that fee for any repeats of the episode. In 2011, it was reported that actors receive a per-episode fee of between £400 and £1,200, and are guaranteed a certain number of episodes per year, perhaps as few as 30 or as many as 100, therefore annual salaries could range from £12,000 to £200,000 depending on the popularity of a character. Some actors' salaries were leaked in 2006, revealing that Natalie Cassidy (Sonia Fowler) was paid £150,000, Cliff Parisi (Minty Peterson) received £220,000, Barbara Windsor (Peggy Mitchell) and Steve McFadden (Phil Mitchell) each received £360,000 and Wendy Richard (Pauline Fowler) had a salary of £370,000. In 2017, it was revealed that Danny Dyer (Mick Carter) and Adam Woodyatt (Ian Beale) were the highest-paid actors in EastEnders, earning between £200,000 and £249,999, followed by Laurie Brett (Jane Beale), Letitia Dean (Sharon Watts), Tameka Empson (Kim Fox), Linda Henry (Shirley Carter), Scott Maslen (Jack Branning), Diane Parish (Denise Fox), Gillian Taylforth (Kathy Beale) and Lacey Turner (Stacey Slater), earning between £150,000 and £199,999.

A 2011 report from the National Audit Office (NAO) showed that EastEnders had an annual budget of £29.9 million. Of that, £2.9 million was spent on scripts and £6.9 million went towards paying actors, extras and chaperones for child actors. According to the NAO, BBC executives approved £500,000 of additional funding for the 25th anniversary live episode (19 February 2010). With a total cost of £696,000, the difference was covered from the 2009–2010 series budget for EastEnders. When repeats and omnibus editions are shown, the BBC pays additional fees to cast and scriptwriters and incurs additional editing costs, which in the period 2009–2010, amounted to £5.5 million. According to a Radio Times article for 212 episodes it works out at £141,000 per episode or 3.5p per viewer hour.

Total annual cost
Year	2002–2003	2003–2004	2004–2005	2005–2006	2006–2007	2007–2008	2008–2009	2009–2010
Cost (£millions)	35.8	36.2	34.7	34.1	33.0	33.6	31.5	29.9

=== Sustainability ===
In 2014, two new studios were built and they were equipped with low-energy lighting which has saved approximately 90,000 kwh per year. A carbon literacy course was run with heads of departments of EastEnders attending. As a result, representatives from each department agreed to meet quarterly to share new sustainability ideas. The paper usage was reduced by 50 per cent across script distribution and other weekly documents and 20 per cent across all other paper usage. The production team also began using recycled paper and stationery.

Additionally, changes made to working online also saved transportation cost of distribution 2,500 DVDs per year. Sets, costumes, paste pots and paint are all recycled by the design department. Cars used by the studio are low emission vehicles and the production team take more efficient energy efficient generators out on location. Caterers no longer use polystyrene cups and recycling on location must be provided.

As a result of EastEnders' sustainability, it was awarded albert+, an award that recognises the production's commitment to becoming a more eco-friendly television production. The albert+ logo was first shown at the end of the EastEnders titles for episode 5281 on 9 May 2016. Four years later, in 2020, the organisation did a follow-up piece about EastEnders' sustainability. They revealed that all food served on set as a prop is vegetarian, unless the script requires it to be meat. All food waste and any other compostable waste, including the flowers from the market's flower stall or from a wedding or funeral, are also collected for anerobic digestion. The soap also began using electric vehicles whilst filming and has its own electric car sharing scheme and charging point. Off set, EastEnders has two hybrid technical vans and extended their hybrid fleet to the props department with a hybrid props van.

== Scheduling ==
=== Broadcast ===
Since 1985, EastEnders has remained at the centre of BBC One's primetime schedule. From 2001 to 2022, it was broadcast at 7:30 pm on Tuesday and Thursday, and 8 pm on Monday and Friday. EastEnders was originally broadcast twice weekly at 7:00 pm on Tuesdays and Thursdays from 19 February 1985; however, in September 1985 the two episodes were moved to 7:30 pm as Michael Grade did not want the soap running in direct competition with Emmerdale Farm, and this remained the same until 7 April 1994. The BBC had originally planned to take advantage of the "summer break" that Emmerdale Farm usually took to capitalise on ratings, but ITV added extra episodes and repeats so that Emmerdale Farm was not taken off the air over the summer. Realising the futility of the situation, Grade decided to move the show to the later 7:30 pm slot.

The show's output then increased to three times a week on Mondays, Tuesdays and Thursdays from 11 April 1994 until 2 August 2001. From 10 August 2001, EastEnders then added its fourth episode (shown on Fridays). This caused some controversy, as the first Friday episode clashed with Coronation Street, which was moved to 8 pm to make way for an hour-long episode of rural soap Emmerdale. In this first head-to-head battle, EastEnders claimed victory over its rival.

In early 2003, viewers could watch episodes of EastEnders on digital channel BBC Three before they were broadcast on BBC One. This was to coincide with the relaunch of the channel and helped BBC Three break the one million viewers mark for the first time with 1.03 million who watched to see Mark Fowler's departure. According to the EastEnders website, there are, on average, 208 episodes outputted each year.

On 21 February 2022, it was announced that from 7 March 2022, EastEnders would begin airing from Monday to Thursday at 7:30 pm, therefore no longer airing on a Friday. This meant that EastEnders would clash with Emmerdale, but the producers stated that due to the importance of online streaming figures, they were not concerned about the soaps clashing on the live television guides.

=== Repeats ===
The omnibus edition, a compilation of the week's episodes in a continuous sequence, originally aired on BBC One on Sunday afternoons, until 1 April 2012, when it was changed to a late Friday night or early Saturday morning slot, commencing on 6 April 2012, though the exact time differed. It reverted to a weekend daytime slot from January 2013 on BBC Two. In 2014, the omnibus moved back to around midnight on Friday nights, and in April 2015, the omnibus was axed, following detailed audience research and the introduction of 30-day catch up on BBC iPlayer and the planning of BBC One +1. The last omnibus on the BBC was shown on 24 April 2015. While W was showing same-day repeats of EastEnders, they also returned the weekend omnibus, starting on 20 February 2016.

From 20 February to 26 May 1995, as part of the programme's 10th anniversary celebrations, episodes from 1985 were repeated each weekday morning at 10 am, starting from episode one. Four specially selected episodes from 1985, 1986 and 1987 were also repeated on BBC1 on Friday evenings at 8 pm under the banner The Unforgettable EastEnders. These included the wedding of Michelle Fowler and Lofty Holloway, the revelation of the father of Michelle's baby, a two-hander between Dot Cotton and Ethel Skinner and the 1986 Christmas episode featuring Den Watts presenting Angie Watts with divorce papers.

EastEnders was regularly repeated at 10 pm on BBC Choice from the channel's launch in 1998, a practice continued by BBC Three for many years until mid-2012 with the repeat moving to 10:30 pm. From 25 December 2010 – 29 April 2011 and 31 July 2012 – 13 August 2012 to the show was repeated on BBC HD in a Simulcast with BBC Three. In 2015, the BBC Three repeat moved back to 10 pm. In February 2016, the repeat moved to W, the rebranded Watch, after BBC Three became an online-only channel. W stopped showing EastEnders in April 2018. Following the reinstatement of BBC Three as a linear channel in 2022, the nightly 'narrative repeat' was not reinstated; instead, the channel retransmits that week's four BBC One episodes at the weekend, airing two episodes on each of Saturday and Sunday evenings, unless live sports or music/events coverage takes precedence. Episodes of EastEnders were available on-demand through BBC iPlayer for 30 days after their original screening; however, starting with the episode broadcast on 4 April 2022, episodes were made available indefinitely.

On 1 December 2012, the BBC uploaded the first 54 episodes of EastEnders to YouTube, and on 23 July 2013 it uploaded a further 14 episodes bringing the total to 68. These have since been taken down. In April 2018, it was announced that the Drama channel would be showing repeats of the show, starting on 6 August 2018 during weekdays; they are also available on-demand on the U catch-up service for 30 days after the broadcast. In December 2019, Christmas episodes were added to Britbox UK.

=== International broadcast ===
Countries in which EastEnders is or has been broadcast

EastEnders is broadcast around the world in many English-speaking countries. New Zealand became the first to broadcast EastEnders overseas, the first episode being shown on 30 August 1985. This was followed by the Netherlands on 8 December 1986, Australia on 5 January 1987, Norway on 27 April, and Barcelona on 30 June (dubbed into Catalan). On 9 July 1987, it was announced that the show would be aired in the United States on PBS. BBC Worldwide licensed 200 hours of EastEnders for broadcast in Serbia on RTS (dubbed into Serbian); it began airing the first episode in December 1997. The series was broadcast in the United States until BBC America ceased broadcasts of the serial in 2003, amidst fan protests. In June 2004, the satellite television provider Dish Network picked up EastEnders, broadcasting episodes starting at the point when BBC America had ceased broadcasting them, offering the series as a pay-per-view item. Episodes air two months behind the UK schedule. Episodes from prior years are still shown on various PBS stations in the US. Since 7 March 2017, EastEnders has been available in the United States on demand, 24 hours after it has aired in the United Kingdom via BritBox, a joint venture between the BBC and ITV.

EastEnders was screened in Australia by ABC TV from 1987 until 1991. The serial was shown on BBC Entertainment (formerly BBC Prime) in Europe and in Africa, where it is approximately six episodes behind the UK. It was also shown on BBC Prime in Asia, but when the channel was replaced by BBC Entertainment, it ceased broadcasting the series.

In Canada, EastEnders was shown on BBC Canada until 2010, at which point it was picked up by VisionTV. In Ireland, EastEnders was shown on TV3 from September 1998 until March 2001, when it moved over to RTÉ One, after RTÉ lost to TV3 the rights to air rival soap Coronation Street. Additionally, episodes of EastEnders are available on-demand through RTÉ Online for seven days after their original screening.

==== Overseas versions ====
In 1991, the BBC sold the programme's format rights to a Dutch production company IDTV. The programme was renamed Het Oude Noorden (Translation: Old North). The Dutch version was written from pre-existing EastEnders scripts. The schedule remained the same as EastEnders with twice weekly episodes; however, some notable changes included the programme now being set in Rotterdam rather than London, characters being given Dutch names (Den and Angie became Ger and Ankie) and the Queen Victoria pub being renamed Cade Faas.

According to Barbara Jurgen, who re-wrote the scripts for a Dutch audience, "the power of the show is undeniable. The scripts are full of hard, sharp drama, plus great one-liners which will translate well to Holland." The Dutch version began broadcasting on VARA 13 March 1993 but was cancelled after 20 episodes.

== Spin-offs and merchandise ==
On 26 December 1988, the first EastEnders "bubble" was shown, titled "CivvyStreet". Since then, "Return of Nick Cotton" (2000), "Ricky & Bianca" (2002), "Dot's Story" (2003), "Perfectly Frank" (2003) and "Pat and Mo" (2004) have all been broadcast, each episode looking into lives of various characters and revealing part of their backstories or lives since leaving EastEnders. In 1993, the two-part story "Dimensions in Time", a charity cross-over with Doctor Who, was shown.

In 1998, EastEnders Revealed was launched on BBC Choice (now BBC Three). The show takes a look behind the scenes of the EastEnders and investigates particular places, characters or families within EastEnders. An episode of EastEnders Revealed that was commissioned for BBC Three attracted 611,000 viewers. As part of the BBC's digital push, EastEnders Xtra was introduced in 2005. The show was presented by Angellica Bell and was available to digital viewers at 8:30 pm on Monday nights. It was also shown after the Sunday omnibus. The series went behind the scenes of the show and spoke to some of the cast members. A new breed of behind-the-scenes programmes have been broadcast on BBC Three since 1 December 2006. These are all documentaries related to current storylines in EastEnders, in a similar format to EastEnders Revealed, though not using the EastEnders Revealed name.

In October 2009, a 12-part online spin-off series entitled EastEnders: E20 was announced. The series was conceived by executive producer Diederick Santer "as a way of nurturing new, young talent, both on- and off-screen, and exploring the stories of the soaps' anonymous bystanders." E20 features a group of sixth-form characters and targets the "Hollyoaks demographic". It was written by a team of young writers and was shown three times a week on the EastEnders website from 8 January 2010. A second 10-part series started in September 2010, with twice-weekly episodes available online and an omnibus on BBC Three. A third series of 15 episodes started in September 2011.

EastEnders and rival soap opera Coronation Street took part in a crossover episode for Children in Need on 19 November 2010 called East Street. On 4 April 2015, EastEnders confirmed plans for a BBC One series featuring Kat and Alfie Moon. The six-part drama, Kat & Alfie: Redwater, was created by executive producer Dominic Treadwell-Collins and his team. In the spin-off, the Moons visit Ireland where they "search for answers to some very big questions".

Until its closure, BBC Store released 553 EastEnders episodes from various years, including the special episode "CivvyStreet", available to buy as digital downloads.

== Popularity and viewership ==
An example of EastEnders' popularity is that after episodes, electricity use in the United Kingdom rises significantly as viewers who have waited for the show to end begin boiling water for tea, a phenomenon known as TV pickup. Over five minutes, power demand rises by three GW, the equivalent of 1.5 to 1.75 million kettles. National Grid personnel watch the show to know when closing credits begin so they can prepare for the surge, asking for additional power from France if necessary.

=== Ratings ===
EastEnders is the BBC's most consistent programme in terms of ratings, and as of 2024, episodes typically receive between 3 and 4 million viewers. EastEnders two biggest ratings rivals are the ITV soaps Coronation Street (produced by Granada Television in Manchester) and Emmerdale (produced by Yorkshire Television in Leeds).

The launch show in 1985 attracted 17.35 million viewers. 25 July 1985 was the first time the show's viewership rose to first position in the weekly top 10 shows for BBC One. The highest-rated episode of EastEnders is the Christmas Day 1986 episode, which attracted a combined 30.15 million viewers who tuned into either the original transmission or the omnibus to see Den Watts hand over divorce papers to his wife Angie. This remains the highest rated episode of a soap in British television history.

In 2001, EastEnders clashed with Coronation Street for the first time. EastEnders won the battle with 8.4 million viewers (41% share) whilst Coronation Street lagged behind with 7.3 million viewers (34% share). On 21 September 2004, Louise Berridge, the then executive producer, quit following criticism of the show. The following day the show received its lowest ever ratings at that time (6.2 million) when ITV scheduled an hour-long episode of Emmerdale against it. Emmerdale was watched by 8.1 million viewers. The poor ratings motivated the press into reporting viewers were bored with implausible and ill-thought-out storylines. Under new producers, EastEnders and Emmerdale continued to clash at times, and Emmerdale tended to come out on top, giving EastEnders lower than average ratings. In 2006, EastEnders regularly attracted between 8 and 12 million viewers in official ratings. EastEnders received its second lowest ratings on 17 May 2007, when 4.0 million viewers tuned in. This was also the lowest ever audience share, with just 19.6 per cent. This was attributed to a conflicting one-hour special episode of Emmerdale on ITV1; however, ratings for the 10 pm EastEnders repeat on BBC Three reached an all-time high of 1.4 million. Despite this, there have been times when EastEnders had higher ratings than Emmerdale, despite the two going head-to-head.

The ratings increased in 2010, thanks to the "Who Killed Archie?" storyline and second wedding of Ricky Butcher (Sid Owen) and Bianca Jackson (Patsy Palmer), and the show's first live episode on 19 February 2010. The live-episode averaged 15.6 million viewers, peaking at 16.6 million in the final five minutes of broadcast. In January 2010, the average audience was higher than that of Coronation Street for the first time in three years. During the 30th anniversary week, in which there were live elements and the climax of the Who Killed Lucy Beale? storyline, 10.84 million viewers tuned in for the 30th anniversary episode itself in an hour long special on 19 February 2015 (peaking with 11.9 million). Later on in the same evening, a special flashback episode averaged 10.3 million viewers, and peaked with 11.2 million. The following day, the anniversary week was rounded off with another fully live episode (the second after 2010) with 9.97 million viewers watching the aftermath of the reveal, the Beale family finding out the truth of Lucy's killer and deciding to keep it a secret. In 2013, the average audience share for an episode was around 30 per cent.

Due to the impact of the COVID-19 pandemic on the soap, EastEnders suffered a ratings drop after 2020. Despite once being the highest-rated soap, it dropped to third in the rankings in 2021, behind Coronation Street and Emmerdale, with 4.09 million viewers. The BBC's head of drama, Piers Wenger, explained that since the episode duration had been shortened and the airtime frequently suffered changes, it had led to the audience not knowing when to watch it. Digital Spy opined that the ratings drop was accredited to "lacklustre storylines" and thought that storylines on rival soaps were better. Later that year, EastEnders suffered its lowest rating ever, with 1.7 million viewers watching live. The Daily Mirror's Jamie Roberts felt that viewers had "turned their back" on the soap due to its lack of interesting stories and iconic characters. Ratings expert Stephen Price also noted that the drop is partly due to the rise of streaming services.

Average, highest and lowest ratings for EastEnders by year
Year	Number of episodes	Average viewers (millions) (Note: Official ratings are over a seven-day period up to 2014 and from 2022 onwards, and over a 28-day period from 2015 to 2021. Up to the end of 2001, but excluding 1996 and 1997, the rating was also combined with that of the omnibus (though for 1993, 1994, 1995 and 1998, some ratings are not combined, as noted).)	Highest rating (millions)	Lowest rating (millions)
1985	91	14.37	23.55	7.75
1986	105	20.66	30.15	13.90
1987	107	21.14	28.00	13.65
1988	104	18.94	24.95	12.60
1989	104	16.99	24.08	12.83
1990	104	17.17	20.80	12.33
1991	105	17.12	22.44	13.06
1992	106	18.28	24.32	11.85
1993 (Note: The viewing figures for 16 episodes are not combined with the omnibus.)	105	17.90	23.21	10.47 (Note: This rating is not combined with the omnibus; the lowest rating for an episode with a combined rating was 12.87 million.)
1994 (Note: The viewing figures for 52 episodes are not combined with the omnibus.)	142	16.02	25.30	7.96 (Note: This rating is not combined with the omnibus; the lowest rating for an episode with a combined rating was 12.02 million.)
1995 (Note: The viewing figures for 138 episodes are not combined with the omnibus.)	157	14.54	22.02 (Note: This rating is combined with the omnibus; the highest rating for an episode without a combined rating was 19.69 million.)	7.88 (Note: This rating is not combined with the omnibus; the lowest rating for an episode with a combined rating was 13.89 million.)
1996	161	14.65	17.92	7.73
1997 (Note: The viewing figures for 10 episodes are unknown.)	162	14.23	18.06	7.13
1998 (Note: The ratings are not combined with the omnibus before 29 June 1998, but are combined thereafter.)	161	14.75	22.14	8.01
1999	169	15.87	20.89	10.89
2000	163	15.47	20.89	9.64
2001	179	15.92	23.18	11.27
2002	211	11.95	16.97	8.33
2003	210	12.58	16.66	8.58
2004	209	11.32	14.80	6.83
2005	209	10.19	14.34	6.76
2006	207	9.16	12.33	4.11
2007	208	8.87	14.38	4.29
2008	208	8.42	11.73	5.30
2009	209	8.43	11.67	5.02
2010	204	9.35	16.41	4.99
2011	211	9.02	11.42	5.74
2012	206	8.23	11.31	5.53
2013	212	7.72	10.03	5.42
2014	206	7.20	9.09	4.58
2015	209	7.17	11.60	5.43
2016	210	6.94	9.47	4.83
2017	209	6.68	8.41	4.19
2018	206	6.12	7.81	4.56
2019 (Note: The viewing figures for five episodes are unknown.)	210	5.60	7.36	4.16
2020 (Note: The viewing figures for 25 episodes are unknown.)	138	5.49	7.46	4.07
2021 (Note: The viewing figures for 95 episodes are unknown.)	209	4.36	5.59	2.54
2022	209	3.72	5.16	2.28
2023	210	3.59	5.45	2.64
2024	210	3.54	5.58	1.38
2025	210	3.55	5.29	2.76

== Reception and impact ==
EastEnders has received both praise and criticism for most of its storylines, which have dealt with difficult themes including violence, rape, murder and child abuse. Since its premiere in 1985, EastEnders has had a large impact on British popular culture and has frequently been referred to in many different media, including songs and television programmes.

=== Initial response ===
The show's first broadcast saw a mixed reaction from viewers. A Sunday People poll of 600 viewers showed 56% of respondents did not enjoy the episode, as the audience were unsure about the show's "coarse" and "bawdy" dialogue. The Guardian critic Hugh Herbert wrote that it would "probably take a year before anyone knows whether the BBC has got it right". The show, regardless, became one of the BBC's most successful shows of the 1980s, which was credited with the reveal that Den Watts was the father of Michelle Fowler's baby. Following the first broadcast, the show was also criticised by Cockney viewers for lacking humour and realism.

=== Morality and violence ===
Mary Whitehouse, social critic, argued at the time that EastEnders represented a violation of "family viewing time" and that it undermined the watershed policy. She regarded EastEnders as a fundamental assault on the family and morality itself. She made reference to representation of family life and emphasis on psychological and emotional violence within the show. She was also critical of language such as "bleeding", "bloody hell", "bastard" and "for Christ's sake"; however, Whitehouse also praised the programme, describing Michelle Fowler's decision not to have an abortion as a "very positive storyline". She also felt that EastEnders had been cleaned up as a result of her protests, though she later commented that EastEnders had returned to its old ways. Her criticisms were widely reported in the tabloid press as ammunition in its existing hostility towards the BBC. The stars of Coronation Street in particular aligned themselves with Mary Whitehouse, gaining headlines such as "STREETS AHEAD! RIVALS LASH SEEDY EASTENDERS" and "CLEAN UP SOAP! Street Star Bill Lashes "Steamy" EastEnders".

EastEnders has been criticised for being too violent, most notably during a domestic violence storyline between Little Mo Morgan (Kacey Ainsworth) and her husband Trevor Morgan (Alex Ferns). As EastEnders is shown pre-watershed, there were worries that some scenes in this storyline were too graphic for its audience. Complaints against a scene in which Little Mo's face was pushed in gravy on Christmas Day were upheld by the Broadcasting Standards Council; however, a helpline after this episode attracted more than 2000 calls. Erin Pizzey, who became internationally famous for having started one of the first women's refuges, said that EastEnders had done more to raise the issue of violence against women in one story than she had done in 25 years. The character of Phil Mitchell (played by Steve McFadden since early 1990) has been criticised on several occasions for glorifying violence and proving a bad role model to children. On one occasion following a scene in an episode broadcast in October 2002, where Phil brutally beat his godson, Jamie Mitchell (Jack Ryder), 31 complaints came from viewers.

In 2003, cast member Shaun Williamson, who was in the final months of his role of Barry Evans, said that the programme had become much grittier over the past 10 to 15 years, and found it "frightening" that parents let their young children watch.

In 2005, the BBC was accused of anti-religious bias by a House of Lords committee, who cited EastEnders as an example. Indarjit Singh, editor of the Sikh Messenger and patron of the World Congress of Faiths, said: "EastEnders' Dot Cotton is an example. She quotes endlessly from the Bible and it ridicules religion to some extent." In July 2010, complaints were received following the storyline of Christian minister Lucas Johnson (Don Gilet) committing a number of murders that he believed was his duty to God, claiming that the storyline was offensive to Christians.

In 2008, EastEnders, along with Coronation Street, was criticised by Martin McGuinness, then Northern Ireland's deputy first minister, for "the level of concentration around the pub" and the "antics portrayed in The [...] Queen Vic".

In 2017, viewers complained on Twitter about scenes implying that Keanu Taylor (Danny Walters) is the father of his 15-year-old sister Bernadette Taylor's (Clair Norris) unborn baby, with the pair agreeing to keep the pregnancy secret from their mother, Karen Taylor (Lorraine Stanley); however, the baby's father is revealed as one of Bernadette's school friends.

=== Allegations of national and racial stereotypes ===
In 1997, several episodes were shot and set in Ireland, resulting in criticisms for portraying the Irish in a negatively stereotypical way. Ted Barrington, the Irish ambassador to the UK at the time, described the portrayal of Ireland as an "unrepresentative caricature", stating he was worried by the negative stereotypes and the images of drunkenness, backwardness and isolation. Jana Bennett, the BBC's then director of production, later apologised for the episodes, stating on BBC1's news bulletin: "It is clear that a significant number of viewers have been upset by the recent episodes of EastEnders, and we are very sorry, because the production team and programme makers did not mean to cause any offence." A year later BBC chairman Christopher Bland admitted that as result of the Irish-set EastEnders episodes, the station failed in its pledge to represent all groups accurately and avoid reinforcing prejudice.

In 2008, the show was criticised for stereotyping their Asian and Black characters, by having a black single mother, Denise Fox (Diane Parish), and an Asian shopkeeper, Zainab Masood (Nina Wadia). There has been criticism that the programme does not authentically portray the ethnic diversity of the population of East London, with the programme being "twice as white" as the real East End.

=== Controversial storylines ===
In 1992, writer David Yallop successfully sued the BBC for £68,000 after it was revealed he had been hired by producer Mike Gibbon in 1989 to pen several controversial storylines in an effort to "slim down" the cast; however, after Gibbon left the programme, executive producers chose not to use Yallop's storylines, which put the BBC in breach of the contract Yallop had signed with them. Unused storylines penned by Yallop, which were revealed in the press during the trial, included the death of Cindy Beale's (Michelle Collins) infant son Steven; Sufia Karim (Rani Singh) being killed during a shotgun raid at the corner shop; Pauline Fowler (Wendy Richard) dying of undiscovered cancer; and an IRA explosion at the Walford community centre, killing Pete Beale (Peter Dean) and Diane Butcher (Sophie Lawrence), and leaving Simon Wicks (Nick Berry) paralysed below the waist. A suicide was also planned, but the character this storyline was assigned to was not revealed.

Some storylines have provoked high levels of viewer complaints. In August 2006, a scene involving Carly Wicks (Kellie Shirley) and Jake Moon (Joel Beckett) having sex on the floor of Scarlet nightclub, and another scene involving Owen Turner (Lee Ross) violently attacking Denise Fox (Diane Parish), prompted 129 and 128 complaints, respectively.

In March 2008, scenes showing Tanya Branning (Jo Joyner) and boyfriend Sean Slater (Robert Kazinsky) burying Tanya's husband Max (Jake Wood) alive attracted many complaints. The UK communications regulator Ofcom later found that the episodes depicting the storyline were in breach of the 2005 Broadcasting Code. They contravened the rules regarding protection of children by appropriate scheduling, appropriate depiction of violence before the 9 p.m. watershed and appropriate depiction of potentially offensive content. In September 2008, EastEnders began a grooming and paedophilia storyline involving characters Tony King (Chris Coghill), Whitney Dean (Shona McGarty), Bianca Jackson (Patsy Palmer), Lauren Branning (Madeline Duggan) and Peter Beale (Thomas Law). The storyline attracted more than 200 complaints.

In December 2010, Ronnie Branning (Samantha Womack) swapped her newborn baby, who died in cot, with Kat Moon's (Jessie Wallace) living baby. Around 3,400 complaints were received, with viewers branding the storyline "insensitive", "irresponsible" and "desperate". Roz Laws from the Sunday Mercury called the plot "shocking and ridiculous" and asked "are we really supposed to believe that Kat won't recognise that the baby looks different?" The Foundation for the Study of Infant Deaths (FSID) praised the storyline, and its director Joyce Epstein explained, "We are very grateful to EastEnders for their accurate depiction of the devastating effect that the sudden death of an infant can have on a family. We hope that this story will help raise the public's awareness of cot death, which claims 300 babies' lives each year." By 7 January, that storyline had generated the most complaints in show history: the BBC received about 8,500 complaints, and media regulator Ofcom received 374; however, despite the controversy, EastEnders pulled in rating highs of 9–10 million throughout the duration of the storyline.

In October 2014, the BBC defended a storyline, after receiving 278 complaints about 6 October 2014 episode where pub landlady Linda Carter (Kellie Bright) was raped by Dean Wicks (Matt Di Angelo). On 17 November 2014 it was announced that Ofcom will investigate over the storyline. On 5 January 2015, the investigation was cleared by Ofcom. A spokesman of Ofcom said: "After carefully investigating complaints about this scene, Ofcom found the BBC took appropriate steps to limit offence to viewers. This included a warning before the episode and implying the assault, rather than depicting it. Ofcom also took into account the programme's role in presenting sometimes challenging or distressing social issues."

In 2022, EastEnders aired their first male rape scene which saw Lewis Butler (Aidan O'Callaghan) rape Ben Mitchell (Max Bowden). The BBC received complaints from viewers who were unhappy with the content in the episode. Viewers felt that the scenes were too violent and graphic for a pre-watershed time slot. The BBC responded by stating: "EastEnders has been a pre-watershed BBC One staple for over 37 years and has a rich history of dealing with challenging and difficult issues and Ben's story is one of these. We have worked closely with organisations and experts in the field to tell this story which we hope will raise awareness of sexual assaults and the issues surrounding them. We are always mindful of the timeslot in which EastEnders is shown and we took great care to signpost this storyline prior to transmission, through on-air continuity and publicity as well as providing a BBC Action Line at the end of the episode which offers advice and support to those affected by the issue".

=== Portrayal of certain professions ===
In 2010, EastEnders came under criticism from the police for the way that they were portrayed during the "Who Killed Archie?" storyline. During the storyline, DCI Jill Marsden (Sophie Stanton) and DC Wayne Hughes (Jamie Treacher) talk to locals about the case and Hughes accepts a bribe. The police claimed that such scenes were "damaging" to their reputation and added that the character DC Deanne Cunningham (Zoë Henry) was "irritatingly inaccurate". In response to the criticism, EastEnders apologised for offending real life detectives and confirmed that it uses a police consultant for such storylines.

In October 2012, a storyline involving Lola Pearce (Danielle Harold), forced to hand over her baby Lexi Pearce, was criticised by the charity The Who Cares? Trust, who called the storyline an "unhelpful portrayal" and said it had already received calls from members of the public who were "distressed about the EastEnders scene where a social worker snatches a baby from its mother's arms". The scenes were also condemned by the British Association of Social Workers (BASW), calling the BBC "too lazy and arrogant" to correctly portray the child protection process, and saying that the baby was taken "without sufficient grounds to do so". Bridget Robb, acting chief of the BASW, said the storyline provoked "real anger among a profession well used to a less than accurate public and media perception of their jobs .. EastEnders' shabby portrayal of an entire profession has made a tough job even tougher."

== Books ==
Many books have been written about EastEnders. Notably, from 1985 to 1988, author and television writer Hugh Miller wrote 17 novels, detailing the lives of many of the show's original characters before 1985, when events on screen took place.

Kate Lock also wrote four novels centred on more recent characters; Steve Owen (Martin Kemp), Grant Mitchell (Ross Kemp), Bianca Jackson (Patsy Palmer) and Tiffany Mitchell (Martine McCutcheon). Lock also wrote a character guide entitled Who's Who in EastEnders (ISBN 978-0-563-55178-2) in 2000, examining main characters from the first 15 years of the show.

Show creators Julia Smith and Tony Holland also wrote a book about the show in 1987, entitled EastEnders: The Inside Story (ISBN 978-0-563-20601-9), telling the story of how the show made it to screen. Two special anniversary books have been written about the show; EastEnders: The First 10 Years: A Celebration (ISBN 978-0-563-37057-4) by Colin Brake in 1995 and EastEnders: 20 Years in Albert Square (ISBN 978-0-563-52165-5) by Rupert Smith in 2005.

== See also ==
- East End of London in popular culture
- List of soap operas
- List of British television programmes
- List of most-watched television broadcasts
- List of television programmes broadcast by the BBC
- List of programmes broadcast by Telefís Éireann
- List of programmes broadcast by Virgin Media Television (Ireland)
- List of programs broadcast by Showcase – List of Showcase shows
- List of LGBT characters in soap operas
- List of television shows set in London
- List of television programs by episode count – Audiovisual broadcasts by narrative units
- Lists of television programs

== Bibliography ==
- Allen, Robert C; Hill, Annette (2004). The television studies reader. Routledge. ISBN 978-0-415-28323-6. OCLC 846446529.
- Barker, Chris (1997). Global television. Wiley-Blackwell. ISBN 978-0-631-20150-2.
- Barraclough, John (1986). EastEnders Special (1987 Annual). London: Grandreams. ISBN 978-0-86227-384-2.
- Brake, Colin (1995). EastEnders: The First 10 Years: A Celebration. BBC Books. ISBN 978-0-563-37057-4.
- Buckingham, David (1987). Public Secrets: EastEnders and Its Audience. London: BFI books. ISBN 978-0-85170-210-0.
- Geraghty, Christine (1991). Women and Soap Opera: A Study of Prime-Time Soaps. Polity Press. ISBN 978-0-7456-0489-3.
- Kingsley, Hilary (1991). EastEnders handbook. London: BBC Books. ISBN 978-0-563-36292-0.
- Monroe, Josephine (1994). The Eastenders programme guide. London: Virgin. ISBN 978-0-86369-825-5.
- Slide, Anthony (1996). Some Joe you don't know : an American biographical guide to 100 British television personalities. Greenwood Press. ISBN 978-0-313-29550-8.
- Smith, Julia; Holland, Tony (1987). EastEnders – The Inside Story. Book Club Associates. ISBN 978-0-563-20601-9.
- Smith, Rupert (2005). EastEnders: 20 Years in Albert Square. BBC Books. ISBN 978-0-563-52165-5.
