= Episode 4043 (Hollyoaks) =

2015 episode of Hollyoaks

- Hollyoaks episode
- Episode no.: Episode 4043
- Directed by: Clive Arnold
- Written by: Steven Fay
- Original air date: 21 January 2015
- Running time: 23 minutes

Guest appearances
- Gabrielle Fernie as Nurse 1; Damien Hasson as Nurse 2

Episode chronology
← Previous; Episode 4042	Next → Episode 4044

Episode 4043 of the British soap opera Hollyoaks aired on 21 January 2015. The episode solely focussed on Ste Hay (Kieron Richardson) and his husband John Paul McQueen (James Sutton) being tested for HIV after Ste is told that a man he had sex with has tested positive. This was the beginning of Ste's long-running HIV storyline, which was announced in 2014. The storyline made Ste the first regular gay character in a soap opera to be diagnosed with HIV. Hollyoaks worked with the British sexual health charity Terrence Higgins Trust for the storyline and they hoped that the plot would encourage people to practise safe-sex and test for HIV. To prepare for the episode, Richardson took an HIV test himself. The storyline was well-received and encouraged people to get tested for HIV, which Richardson believed saved lives. The episode was praised and shortlisted for "Best Single Episode" at the 2015 British Soap Awards.

== Plot ==
Ste Hay (Kieron Richardson) has just told his husband John Paul McQueen (James Sutton) that he might have HIV after being told that a man he had sex with, Connor (Jonno Davies), has tested positive. John Paul and Ste discuss the situation and John Paul says that they will get tested in the morning. When they wake up, John Paul rings a sexual health clinic and books HIV tests for both of them. Ste ignores talking about the situation and hangs out with John Paul's family. John Paul's cousin Theresa McQueen (Jorgie Porter) is struggling over the departure of her love interest Dodger Savage (Danny Mac). John Paul and Ste keep the testing a secret from the family. Ste does not want to go, and when his half-sisters Tegan (Jessica Ellis) and Leela Lomax (Kirsty-Leigh Porter) arrive, he decides to go to his niece Peri Lomax' (Ruby O'Donnell) piano recital instead, despite opposition from John Paul. However, at the recital Ste rushes off and joins John Paul at the clinic.

John Paul and Ste engage in small talk and talk about HIV. Ste believes that HIV and AIDS are the same thing, but John Paul corrects him. Ste notes that he was very unwell and wonders if it was symptoms of HIV. Ste panics and rushes to the bathroom after hearing a voicemail message from his children Leah Barnes (Ela-May Demircan) and Lucas Hay (William Hall). A stressed Ste considers not getting tested and tells John Paul that he is not sure about how he will tell his children. John Paul expresses frustration that Ste has not asked him how he is coping and he snaps at Ste for having unprotected sex. The couple admit that they both are scared but John Paul says that he is going to stick by Ste as he loves him and wants to spend the rest of his life with him, assuring that they will get through this together.

Whilst waiting, Ste and John Paul play a game and discuss music. The pair are then called in and get tested separately. The couple get asked questions about their sexual history separately and are asked if they have people that can support them if they test positive. John Paul says that he is close with his family whilst Ste says that he could speak to his half-sisters but not his children. Ste and John Paul are then both tested for HIV using a finger rapid prick HIV test. John Paul is told that he has tested negative whereas Ste is told that his test was positive. Ste is told about how his doctor will be contacted and what will happen next, but he is in shock that he is HIV positive. John Paul then comforts a stunned Ste.

== Background and development ==
In November 2014, it was announced that Hollyoaks character Ste Hay (Kieron Richardson) would be diagnosed with HIV in a new storyline, which would begin when Ste has unprotected sex with a stranger. This made Ste the first regular gay character in soap operas to be diagnosed and shown living with HIV. Other soap opera characters, such as Mark Fowler (Todd Carty) in EastEnders and Val Pollard (Charlie Hardwick) in Emmerdale, had been diagnosed with HIV in storylines, but they were heterosexual. Joe Wallace (Jason Rush) had also been a guest gay character on EastEnders who lived with HIV in the 1990s. This was part of Hollyoaks's 2015 "year of safe sex", which featured storylines in the soap which explored the "implications" of having unprotected sex. The storyline had been in development for several months and Hollyoaks worked with the British sexual health charity Terrence Higgins Trust for the storyline. The charity's head of media, Will Harris, said that the storyline was "rooted in reality", adding, "Every day in the UK, around eight more gay or bisexual men are told they have contracted HIV, most of them from someone who hadn't yet been diagnosed." Harris explained that Ste did not use a condom as he did not see the risk. Hollyoaks executive producer Bryan Kirkwood revealed that the soap had wanted to have this storyline for a "long time", explaining that whilst HIV affects people of all sexualities, "infection rates in young gay men remain too high and to ignore that is to do the gay audience a disservice. Hollyoaks is in a unique position to be able to talk directly to millions of young viewers and if the safe-sex message is not coming through education we can help with that both on screen and through multi-platform support".

"I think we're all humans and we're all equal, so the story is not about sexuality. Ste has made a mistake by not having safe sex, but it's not because he's gay that he's contracted HIV. I'm surprised people are saying it's quite a groundbreaking thing, as Ste is just a regular guy who has made a massive mistake and now he's got to live with the consequences"

— Richardson on Hollyoaks exploring HIV through a gay character (2015)

Richardson had known about the storyline since April 2014 and teased a story that had not "been done before" at the 2014 British Soap Awards. The actor felt grateful to have time to prepare and explained that the soap had more time to prepare than with other storylines to ensure it was portrayed well. He was happy that Hollyoaks was promoting safe sex as he believed that it would could encourage viewers to get tested and use condoms. Richardson revealed that he felt uneducated about sex as his school had not covered it and that when he first got tested for HIV, he was worried that he would die if he found out he got it, as he associated HIV with the situation in the 1980s. Hollyoaks spoke to people who had been diagnosed with HIV and wanted to learn about their emotional response as research for the storyline.

Richardson revealed that some people had opined that the storyline should not go ahead due to the stereotype of just gay people getting HIV, but he believed that that was not the case and added opined that the storyline had not been portrayed before due to people "shying away from it", adding, "We can't get away from the fact that unfortunately it is predominately on the rise at the moment within the gay community." Richardson also revealed that he has friends living with HIV and that he was glad that Hollyoaks was giving "a voice to the LGBT community". It was also revealed that the storyline would also explore Ste's relationship with John Paul McQueen (James Sutton), as well as the affect on Ste's children, marriage and physical and psychological wellbeing. Speaking about the storyline on This Morning, Richardson explained, "It's great because [the storyline] is two people's journeys. It's not just Ste's, it's John Paul's as well - how he deals with his husband having HIV [...] in a couple of weeks' time, the whole village have to find out and it's everyone's reactions".

== Production ==
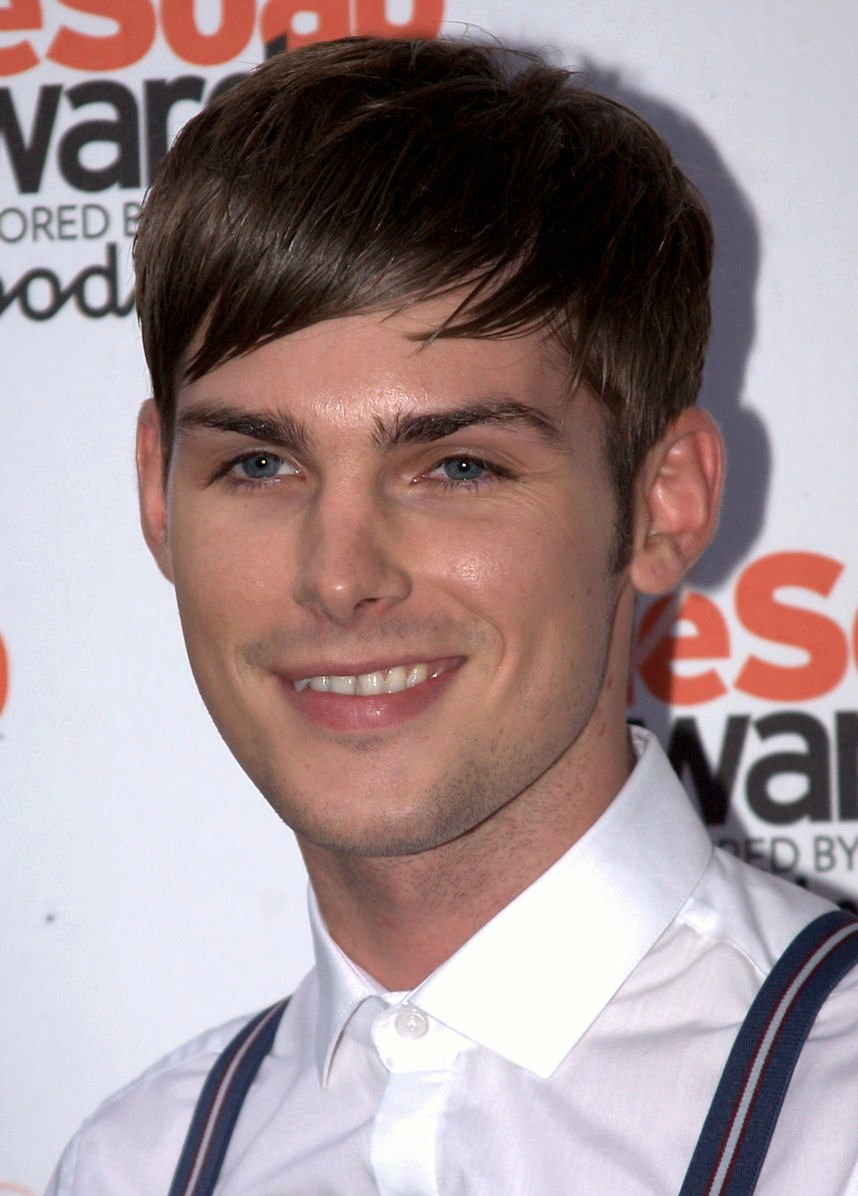
Kieron Richardson (pictured) took a HIV test to prepare for the episode.

Episode 4043 was written by Steven Fay and directed by Clive Arnold. It was broadcast on 21 January 2015 at 6:30pm on Channel 4. This was a special episode which focuses on John Paul and Ste going to a sexual health clinic to get HIV tests and begins Ste's long-running HIV storyline. This was the sole storyline featured in the episode, which Richardson was pleased with. The episode aired the day after the departure of Dodger Savage (Danny Mac), and Richardson was unsure how viewers would react, as he thought that they might be missing Dodger. Episode 4043 was filmed in real time, with Ste shown waking up in the morning and deciding to go to the clinic to get tested. Richardson explained, "Everything that happens in the clinic from getting these instant results – they do a prick in your finger and it takes minutes – you see the journey of all of that through the episode". The actor revealed that Ste initially does not want to get tested and wants to carry on as normal, but he cannot do that as he is in a relationship.

Richardson spoke with people who had received a HIV diagnosis. He revealed that the storyline would have a positive outcome and he hoped it would convince viewers to get tested. To prepare for the episode, Richardson had a HIV test beforehand to understand his character's situation. Talking about the storyline's future development, Richardson said that Ste's reaction would be true to his character and that he would initially blame Connor and not take responsibility for the fact that he did not use a condom. Richardson also said that Ste would not be defined by his HIV status and that the following weeks would see the reactions of other characters, such as Ste's children, to the news. He added that Ste would face some ignorance over having HIV, which Richardson believed had to be shown in the soap due to it happening in real life.

== Reception and impact ==
The episode was shortlisted for "Best Single Episode" at the 2015 British Soap Awards. Richardson believed that the episode "went down a storm". The actor explained that many viewers expressed surprise over how easy it was to take a HIV test. People who were diagnosed with HIV praised the storyline. Richardson revealed that the episode had been positively received, which he described as "probably one of the biggest reactions I've had so far and in a really positive way". Some people asked Richardson if Ste's diagnosis meant that he would die, which was one of the reasons that Richardson believed that the storyline should be told in order to change perceptions.

A writer from Digital Spy included Ste's HIV diagnosis on his list of Ste's 10 most memorable moments, writing that whilst the soap "caught some criticism for stereotyping by having one of its few gay characters contracting the virus", Hollyoaks had "sensitively handled" and informed viewers on "the subject of day-to-day management of the virus without scaremongering", with Ste being shown having relationships, going to his job and taking his medication whilst also being "angry, frightened and in denial", which the writer believed was an "interesting and detailed picture" of how people deal with HIV long-term. Daniel Kilkelly from the same website believed that Ste flinching when John Paul tried to kiss showed that the pair faced a "very uncertain future". A writer from Soaplife called Ste's situation a "nightmare". Laura Denby from Radio Times opined that Ste's HIV diagnosis was an example of soap operas breaking boundaries portraying LGBTQ+ issues, writing that "Richardson earned much praise for his poignant performance, as Ste became the first gay soap character to be diagnosed with the condition". Denby noted that Ste and John Paul had been able to get tested soon as "Medical developments now meant that someone could get tested and diagnosed with the condition on the same day", and that Ste was since "living a stable, healthy life while on medication to control the illness".

A poll in January 2015 showed that 96% of respondents believed that the storyline would encourage LGBTQ+ men to get tested and break down stigma. Matthew Hodson from men's health charity GMFA said that the storyline would help "generate discussion about HIV and sexual risk, particularly among younger people", whereas a London research group showed that younger gay men thought it was unlikely that HIV would personally affect them and thus Hodson hoped "showing a well-liked character come to terms with his HIV diagnosis, Hollyoaks will be able to counter some of the myths and misrepresentations of HIV that contribute to stigma". Richardson said in 2016 that the storyline had saved lives as he had received letters from people who got diagnosed early after they got tested due to seeing the storyline.
