= List of EastEnders crew members =

This is a list of producers, writers and directors for the BBC soap opera EastEnders.

== Production team ==
Role	Name(s)
Script producer	Kieran Grimes
Senior script editor	Sophie Saczak
Script editors	Leah Brown (assistant); Keren Coleman; Laura Cull; Tia Daby; Kirsty McNeil; Riz Moritz; Grant Reid; Pruthvi Pandit; Sophie Robertson; Ciaran Stordy
Editorial producer	Sophie Samuda
Story producer	Kyri Zindilis
Series story scheduler	Kayla Miller
Story editor	Ade Lamuye
Storyliners	Maisie Adair; Cleo Bicât; Jake Francis; Declan Perring; Lucy Foley (junior)
Researchers	Omar Belkessam (senior); Emily Baxter-Derrington; Holly Loach; Sam Goodfellow (junior)
Screenwriters	Carey Andrews; Simon Ashdown; Jessica Barnes; Johnny Candon; Gem Copping; Lynne Dallow; Richard Davidson; Katie Douglas; Nadine Flynn; Aodhan Gallagher; Lisa Gifford; Rob Gittins; Niall Grant-Rowlands; Jahvel Hall; Orla Hannon; Rebekah Harrison; Lawrie Jordan; Yasmeen Khan; Bryan Kirkwood; Lauren Klee; Pete Lawson; Daran Little; David Moor; Nk'iru Njoku; Simon Norman; Rory John Nugent; Jonny O'Neill; James Payne; Charlotte Pattullo; Bea Roberts; Kevin Rundle; Lee Saczak; Laura Sleep; Katrina Smith-Jackson; Mark Stevenson; Chloe Timms; Poz Watson
Directors	Danny Albury; Jamie Annett; Jane Ashmore; Indra Bhose; David Bispham; Ellie Brent; Alex Browning; Ben Cohen; Charlotte Conquest; Audrey Cooke; Paul Copeland; Lloyd Eyre-Morgan; Toby Frow; John Greening; Miguel Guerriero; Thomas Hescott; Mickey Jones; Abe Juckes; David Kester; Vicki Kisner; Lance Kneeshaw; Richard Lynn; Christopher McGill; Kerri McLean; Conor Morrissey; Karl Neilson; Richard Platt; Paulette Randall; Cóilín Ó'Scolaí; George Siougas; Owen Tooth; David Tucker; Emma Bridgeman-Williams; Laurence Wilson
Company manager	Carolyn Weinstein
Line producer	Dee Hellier
Senior production manager	Rona McKendrick
Assistant production manager	Hayley Longhurst
Production managers	Chris Alexander; Ruth Christie; Rosie Gilbert; Anne-Marie Kassar; Andrew Mackie; Emma Perry; Matthew Purves; Charlotte Randall; Steve Roberts; Una Saplamides; Julie Sykes; Mark Turner; Sara Wilkinson
Series producer	Sharon Batten
Executive producer	Ben Wadey

== Producers ==
=== Senior executive producers ===
- Kate Oates (2019–2026)

=== Executive producers ===
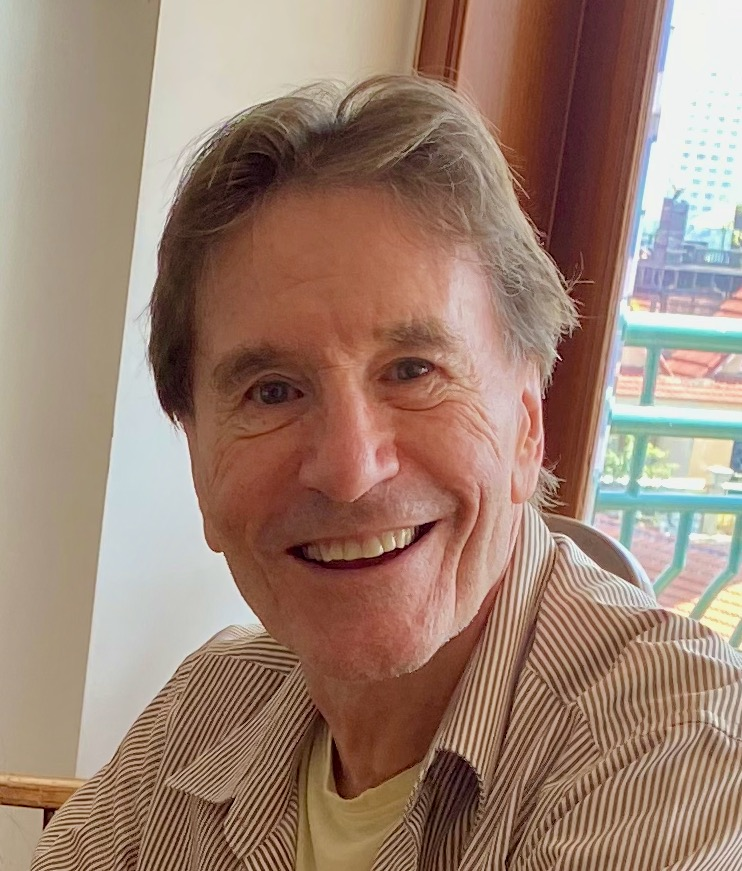
Matthew Robinson, executive producer from 1998 to 2000, earned the tabloid soubriquet "Axeman of Albert Square" after writing out a large number of characters in one hit

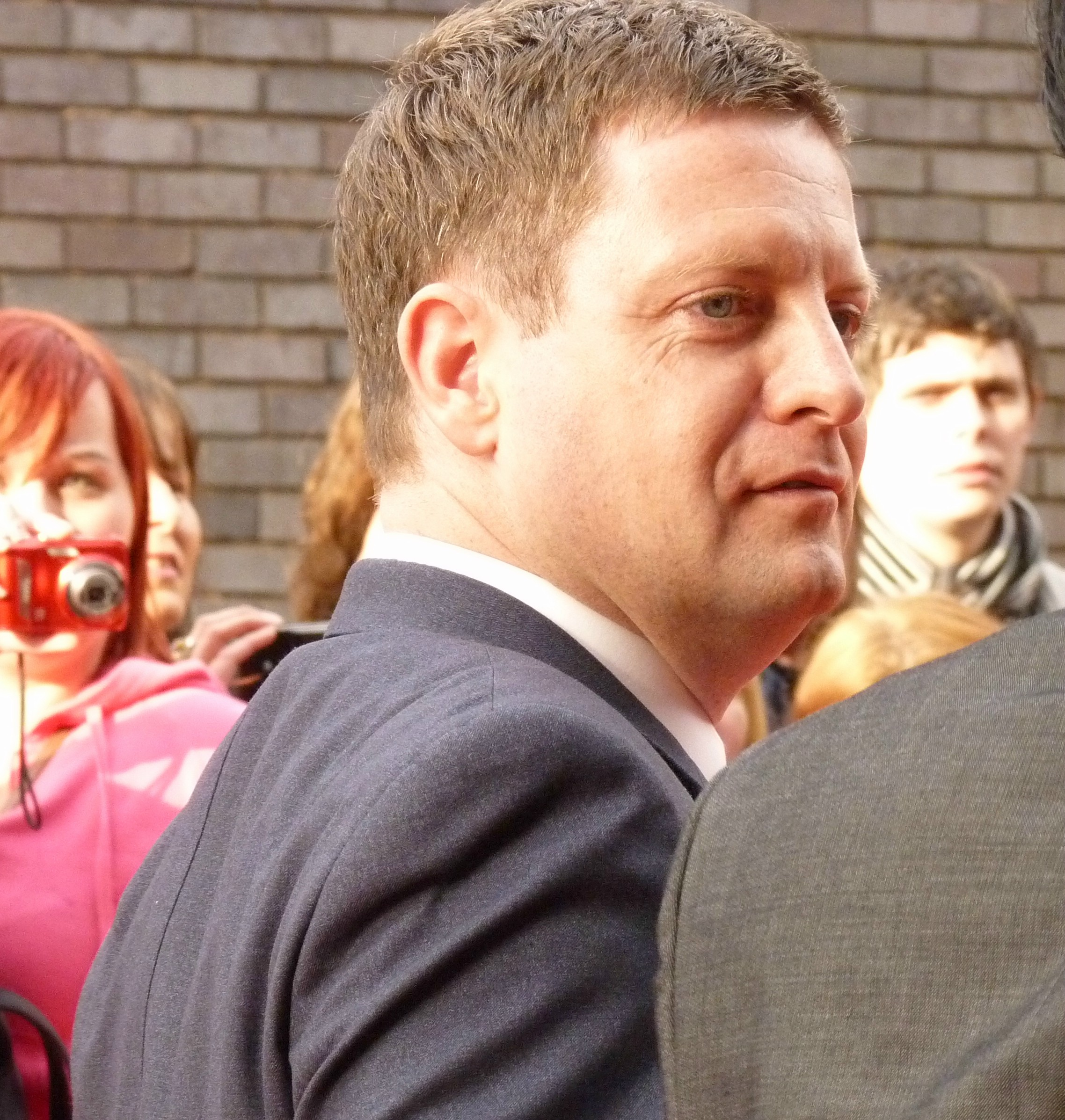
Bryan Kirkwood, executive producer from 2010 to 2012

- Julia Smith (1985–1989)
- Mike Gibbon (1989-1990)
- Michael Ferguson (1990–1991)
- Pat Sandys (1991)
- Leonard Lewis (1991–1994)
- Helen Greaves (1991–1992)
- Barbara Emile (1994–1995)
- Corinne Hollingworth (1995–1997)
- Jane Harris (1997–1998)
- Mike Hudson (1998)
- Matthew Robinson (1998–2000)
- John Yorke (2000–2002)
- Louise Berridge (2002–2004)
- Kathleen Hutchison (2004–2005)
- John Yorke (2005, acting)
- Kate Harwood (2005–2007)
- Diederick Santer (2007–2010)
- Bryan Kirkwood (2010–2012)
- Lorraine Newman (2012–2013)
- Dominic Treadwell-Collins (2013–2016)
- Sean O'Connor (2016–2017)
- Jon Sen (2019–2022)
- Chris Clenshaw (2022–2025)
- Ben Wadey (2025–Present)

=== Executive consultants ===
- John Yorke (2017–2019)

=== Senior producers ===
- Nicky Cotton
- Sharon Batten
- Liza Mellody

=== Associate producers ===
- Simon Bird (2006–2008)
- Diana Brookes (unknown)
- Michael Darbon (2004–2005)
- Derek Donohoe (2025)
- Corinne Hollingworth (1986–1989)
- Nick Jones (2000)
- Rona McKendrick (2003)
- Sue Smith (2001–2004)
- Nigel Taylor (2000–2001)
- Nick Orchard (1985–86)
- Lesley Longfellow (1995-1998)

=== Line producers ===
- Susan Mather (2008–2021)
- Derek Donohoe (2017)
- Dee Hellier (2017, 2021–Present)

=== Studio producers ===
- Liza Mellody (2018-2019)

=== Series producers ===
- Julia Smith (1985–1988)
- Mike Gibbon (1989-1991)
- Leonard Lewis (1991-1994)
- Barbara Emile (1994-1995)
- Jane Harris (1995–1997)
- Mike Hudson (1997-1999)
- John Yorke (1999-2000)
- Lorraine Newman (2000-2002)
- Louise Berridge (2002)
- Belinda Campbell (2003)
- Helena Pope (2003-2004)
- Peter Rose (2004)
- Sharon Hughff (2004–2005)
- Lorraine Newman (2005-2012)
- Jenny Robins (2012)
- Sharon Batten (2012–2013)
- Ceri Meyrick (2013)
- Alison Davis (2013–2014)
- Sharon Batten (2015–present)

=== Series story producers ===
- Huw Kennair-Jones (2004–2005)
- Brigie de Courcy (2006–2007)
- Dominic Treadwell-Collins (2007–2010)
- Emily Gascoyne (2010–2011)
- Kathleen Beedles (2011–2012)
- Deborah Sathe (2012–2013)
- Sarah Beeson (2013)
- Alexander Lamb (2013–2016)
- Liza Mellody (2017–2018)
- Chris Clenshaw (2018–2019)
- Ciaràn Hayden (2018)
- Nasreen Ahmed (2019)
- Poz Watson (2019–2021)
- Erin Kubicki (2021)
- Ian Warren (2021-2022)
- Rory Nugent (2022-2023)
- Kyri Zindilis (2021, 2023–Present)

=== Script producers ===
- Lorraine Newman (2000-2001)
- Liza Mellody (2004)
- Tom Mullens (2005-2006)
- Vicki Delow (2006-2007)
- Sharon Batten (2007-2013)
- Manpreet Dosanjh (2013-2015)
- Ross Murray (2015)
- Nicole Fitzpatrick (2016-2017)
- Kris Green (2017-2021, 2022-2023)
- Claire Burgess (2021-2022)
- Kieran Grimes (2023–Present)

== Directors ==
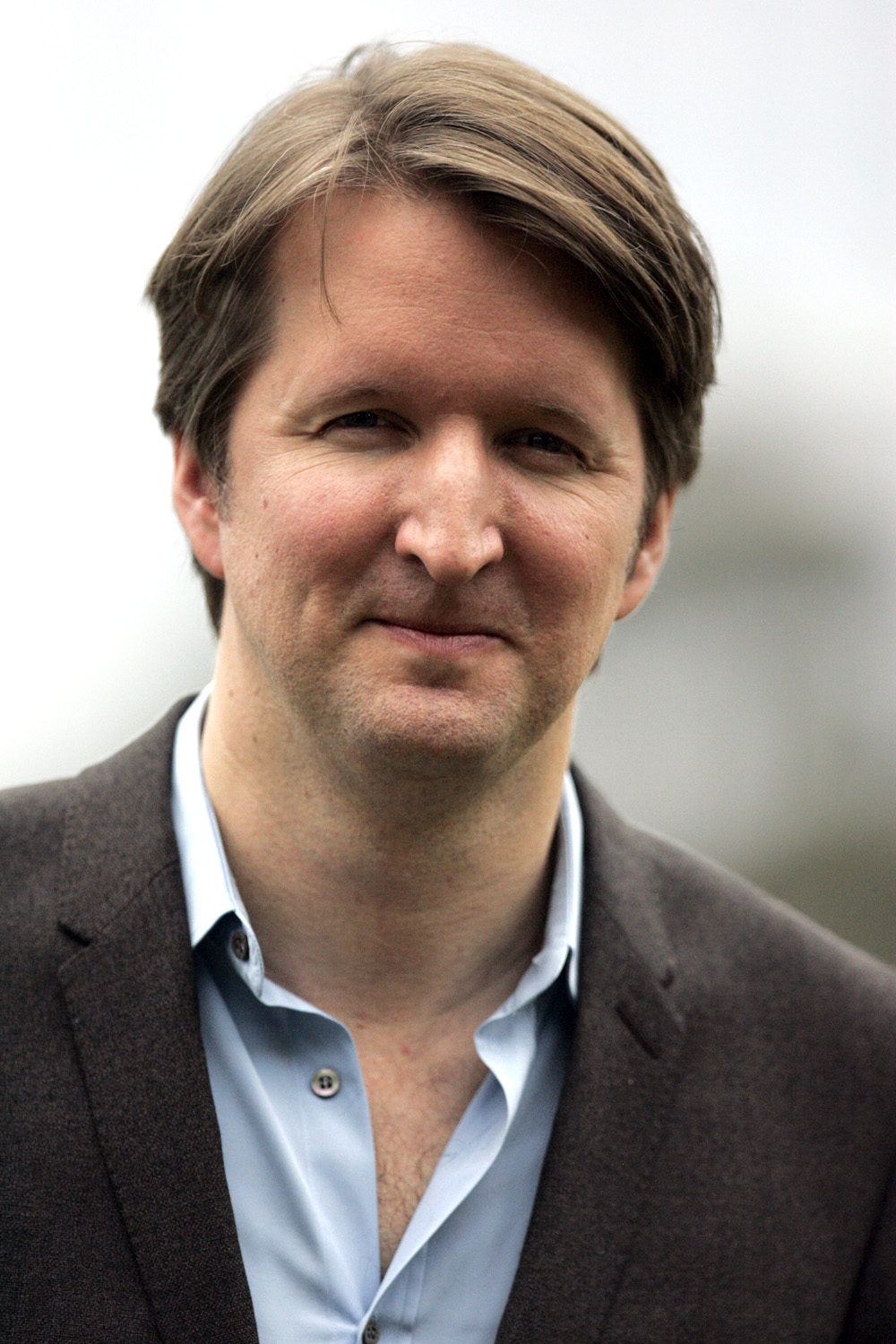
Tom Hooper

- Neil Alderton (2016–2017)
- Romey Allison (1986–1987)
- Jeremy Ancock (1985, 1988)
- David Andrews (1991)
- Jamie Annett (1998–2012, 2018–)
- Paul Annett (1998–2002, 2005–2009)
- Sallie Aprahamian (1995–1996, 2014)
- Douglas Argent (1991)
- Clive Arnold (2000–2001, 2003–2013, 2019)
- Sven Arnstein (2006)
- Jane Ashmore (2016–2019)
- Sheila Atha (1990)
- Albert Barber (1996–1997)
- Ian Barber (2013)
- Mike Barnes (1990)
- Edward Bazalgette (2007)
- Adrian Bean (1994–1998)
- Charles Beeson (1990–1992)
- Paul Bernard (1990)
- Indra Bhose (1992–1993, 1996, 2019, 2021–)
- Antonia Bird (1985–1986)
- Darrol Blake (1989–1990)
- Gerald Blake (1989)
- Keith Boak (1993–1994)
- Peter Boisseau (1989)
- Jeff Lincoln Boulter (unknown)
- Dermot Boyd (1995, 1997)
- Ed Braman (1996)
- Will Brenton (2019)
- Michael E. Briant (1995)
- Emma Bridgeman-Williams (1999–2002)
- Bill Britten (1996)
- Jeremy Brock (1995)
- Ian Brown (1999)
- John Bruce (1991–1992)
- Michael Buffong (2002–2003, 2009–2010)
- Stephen Butcher (1985, 1991, 2001)
- Sue Butterworth (1985–1986, 1994–1995, 2001–2005)
- Sue Bysh (1994–1995)
- Helen Caldwell (1999)
- Topher Campbell (2007)
- Philip Casson (1990–2005, 2008)
- Justin Chadwick (1999–2000)
- Lisa Clarke (2003, 2006)
- S. J. Clarkson (2004)
- Chris Clough (1985–1988)
- Nicholas (Nick) Cohen (2007)
- Audrey Cooke (1995, 2009–2010, 2014, 2017, 2020)
- Frank Cox (1988)
- Vivienne Cozens (1985)
- Ron Craddock (1986)
- David Crozier (1990)
- Mervyn Cumming (1987–1991)
- Richard Dale (1999–2000)
- Jennie Darnell (2007–2018)
- John Darnell (1994)
- Ella Davis (unknown)
- Angela (Angie) de Chastelai Smith (1999–2000, 2002–2003)
- Jonathan Dent (1995–1997)
- Edward Dick (2020)
- Mike Dormer (1991–1992)
- Nigel Douglas (1995–1996, 2001–2003)
- John Dower (2003–2006, 2016–2019)
- Philip Draycott (1988–1990, 1998)
- Haldane Duncan (1997–1998)
- Sue Dunderdale (1991–1995, 1999, 2001, 2005)
- Terry Dyddgen-Jones (2010–2011)
- Jon East (1996–1997, 2000–2001)
- Christiana Ebohon (2002–2003)
- David Innes Edwards (1991–1992, 1994)
- Julie Edwards (1998–2000)
- Peter Edwards (1985, 1988)
- Stewart Edwards (2000–2001)
- James Erskine (2002)
- Sarah Esdaile (2019–)
- Matthew Evans (1989–1990, 1992, 2019–)
- Rob Evans (1994–1995, 1997, 1999)
- Brett Fallis (1997–2004)
- Chris Fallon (1994–1996, 2008)
- Geoff Feld (1991–1998, 2000–2002)
- Michael Ferguson (1990)
- Steve Finn (1995, 2002–2004, 2006–2012, 2014–2018)
- Maggie Ford (1993)
- Henry Foster (1987, 1996)
- Toby Frow (2014–)
- Robert Gabriel (1985–1986, 1989, 1998–2000)
- Anthony Garrick (1998)
- Roger Gartland (1992–1993)
- Stephen Garwood (1993–1994, 1998, 2018)
- Rebecca Gatward (2010, 2013–2016)
- Martin Gent (unknown)
- Mike Gibbon (1985–1989)
- Elizabeth (Liz) Gill (2010)
- Bill Gilmour (1994–1996)
- Kenneth (Kenny) Glenaan (1998, 2020)
- Jim Goddard (1999)
- Steve Goldie (1987–1989, 1995–1996, 2002, 2005)
- John Gorrie (1996)
- John Greening (1996, 2002–)
- Alister Hallum (1990)
- Graeme Harper (2000, 2002)
- Geoff Harris (2002)
- Paul Harrison (1990)
- Graeme Hattrick (2001–2005)
- Andy Hay (2000–2002)
- Bill Hays (1991–1994)
- Sean Healy (2018–2019, 2021–)
- Thomas Hescott (2016–2017, 2019)
- Nicky Higgens (2011–2012)
- Christopher Hodson (1990)
- Julian Holmes (1997–1998, 2000)
- Matt Holt (2020)
- Richard Holthouse (1991)
- Tom Hooper (1989–2000)
- John Howlett (2012–)
- Menhaj Huda (2000)
- Terry Iland (1989, 1991–1992)
- Waris Islam (2016–2019)
- Caroline Jeffries (2006)
- Marc Jobst (2002)
- Jo Johnson (1994–1995, 2003–2004, 2008)
- Mickey Jones (2011–2012, 2014–2016, 2019–2020)
- Nick Jones (1999)
- Francesca Joseph (2000, 2010)
- Chris Jury (2000–2004)
- Alex Kalymnios (2010–2013)
- Dominic Keavey (2005, 2013–2018, 2020)
- Michael Keillor (2007–2010)
- Karen Kelly (2003)
- James Kent (2000)
- Oliver Kent (2003)
- Michael Kerrigan (1990)
- David Kester (2003–2005, 2019–)
- Ray Kilby (1997–1998)
- Clare Kilner (1997–1998)
- Tom Kingdon (1987–1988, 1996–1997)
- Margy Kinmonth (1992–1993)
- Lance Kneeshaw (2010–)
- Christine Lalla (2021–)
- Philippa Langdale (1997–1998)
- James Larkin (2018–2019)
- Richard Laxton (1993)
- Tim Leandro (1997–1999, 2003–2004)
- Barry Letts (1990–1992)
- Leonard Lewis (1990–1994)
- Sophie Lifschutz (2013–2017)
- Nickie Lister (2020)
- Mike Lloyd (1986)
- Christopher (Chris) Lovett (1987–1989)
- Richard Lynn (2012–2019)
- Stuart MacDonald (1988)
- Jonathan Marks (2003)
- David Mason (1996)
- Simon Massey (2019–)
- Dez McCarthy (1997–1999)
- Christopher (Chris) McGill (2019–)
- Tony McHale (1992–1994)
- Tim Mercier (2000–2003, 2005–2014)
- Simon Meyers (1992)
- Chris Miller (1994–1995, 1997, 1999–2000)
- Peter Moffatt (1986)
- David Moor (2013–2019, 2021–)
- Stephen Moore (1996–1997)
- Reza Moradi (2014–2015)
- Andrew Morgan (1993–1994)
- Brian Morgan (1985)
- Michael Owen Morris (2003–2019)
- Conor Morrissey (2018–)
- Jeff Naylor (1994–1996, 2005)
- Karl Neilson (2001–2007, 2009–)
- Afia Nkrumah (2016–2018)
- Sean O'Connor (2002)
- Deborah Paige (2002)
- Kay Patrick (1986)
- Joy Perino (1996)
- Nic Phillips (2006, 2009, 2011–2016)
- Richard (Rick) Platt (2000–2002, 2004–2012, 2016–2017, 2019)
- Nicholas Prosser (1986–1992, 2002–2005)
- Hannah Quinn (2019)
- Sarah Punshon (2007, 2009)
- Jeremy Raison (2004)
- Nimer Rashed (2020)
- Nick Read (1997)
- Beryl Richards (1992–1993)
- Chris Richards (2005–2007)
- David Richardson (1995–1998)
- Matthew Robinson (1985–1987)
- Vito Rocco (2017)
- Peter Rose (2003–2010)
- Anne Ross Muir (2002)
- Gwennan Sage (1993–1995, 2009–2013)
- Lee Salisbury (2010–2012, 2014, 2016)
- Michael Samuels (1999, 2001)
- Dominic Santana (2002)
- Kate Saxon (2014, 2016–2018)
- Mark Sendell (2000–2008)
- Penelope Shales-Slyne (1994, 1996–1998, 2006, 2016–2018, 2020)
- Jim Shields (1998–1999)
- Steve Shill (1995–1998)
- Pip Short (1995–1996, 1998)
- Jeremy Silberston (1988–1989)
- Bren Simson (1986, 1993)
- William (Will) Sinclair (2006–2007)
- William Slater (1985–1989)
- Jerry Smith (2011)
- Julia Smith (1985–1989)
- Jean Stewart (1991)
- Brian Stirner (1993–1994)
- Karen Stowe (1995–1996)
- Rupert Such (2006, 2008–2010, 2012–2014)
- Piotr Szkopiak (2012–2014)
- Malcolm Taylor (1985)
- Alice Troughton (2004–2006)
- David Tucker (2008–2011, 2014–2019)
- Garth Tucker (1986–1989, 1992–1995)
- Susan Tully (1998–1999)
- Paul Unwin (1992–1993)
- Tony Virgo (1986–1988)
- Dearbhla Walsh (2002)
- Alan Wareing (1986, 1990)
- Laura Way (2018–2019)
- Bruce Webb (2019)
- Ian White (1993, 2012–2018)
- Gill Wilkinson (2014–2015)
- Misha Williams (1994–1995)
- Daniel Wilson (2000, 2011–2014, 2019)
- Laurence Wilson (2006–2010, 2016–)
- Ronald Wilson (1992)
- Claire Winyard (1996–1997, 2014)
- Jeremy Woolf (1993–1994)
- Colin Wratten (2001–2003)
- Jonathan Wright-Miller (1991–1993)
- Paul Wroblewski (1997, 2005–2006)
- Ali Yassine (2003)
- Johnathan Young (1995–1996)

== Writers ==
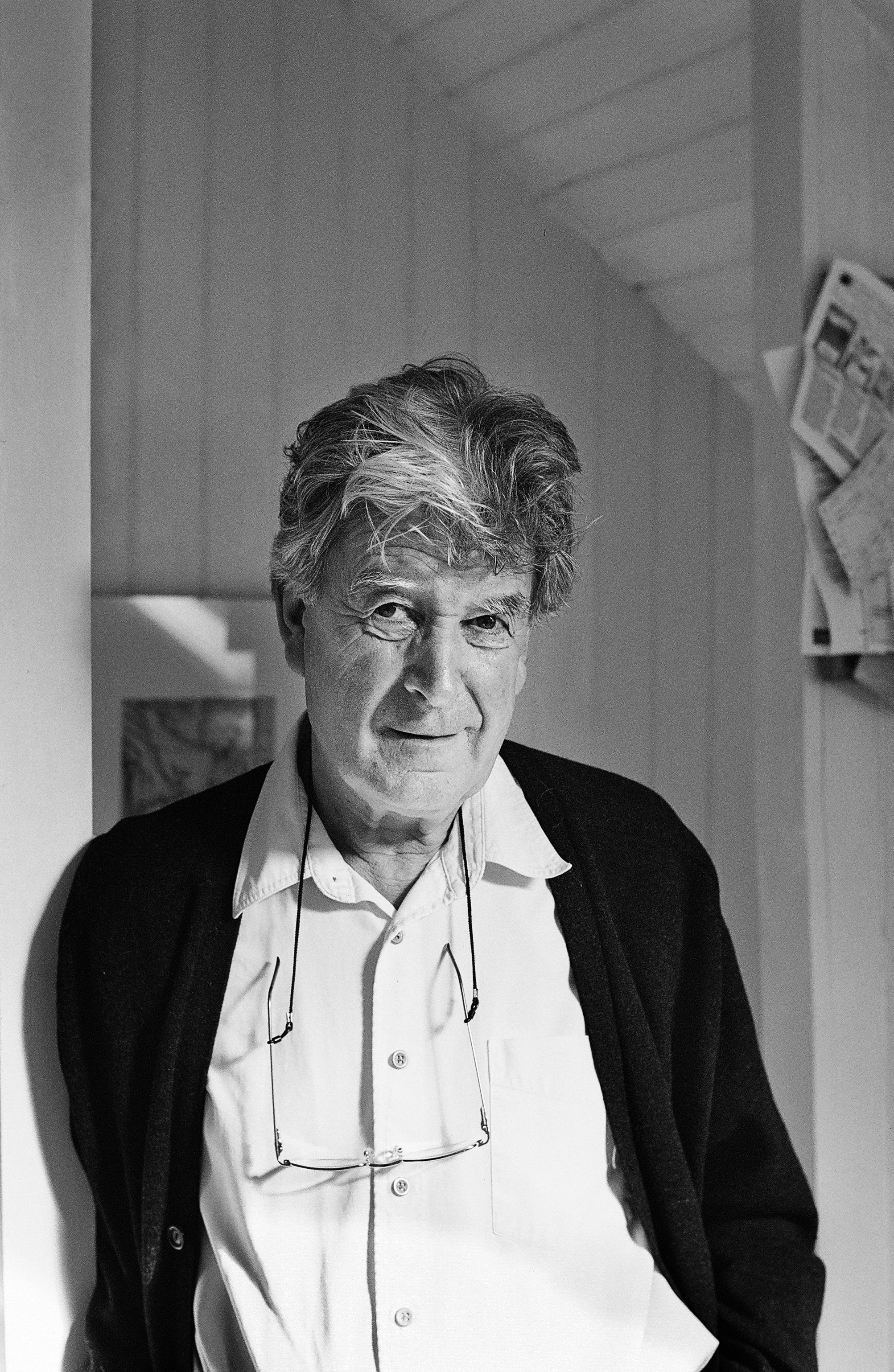
David Ashton

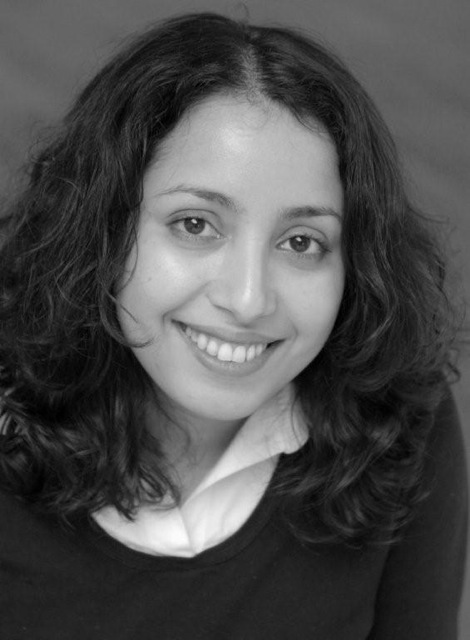
Nazrin Choudhury

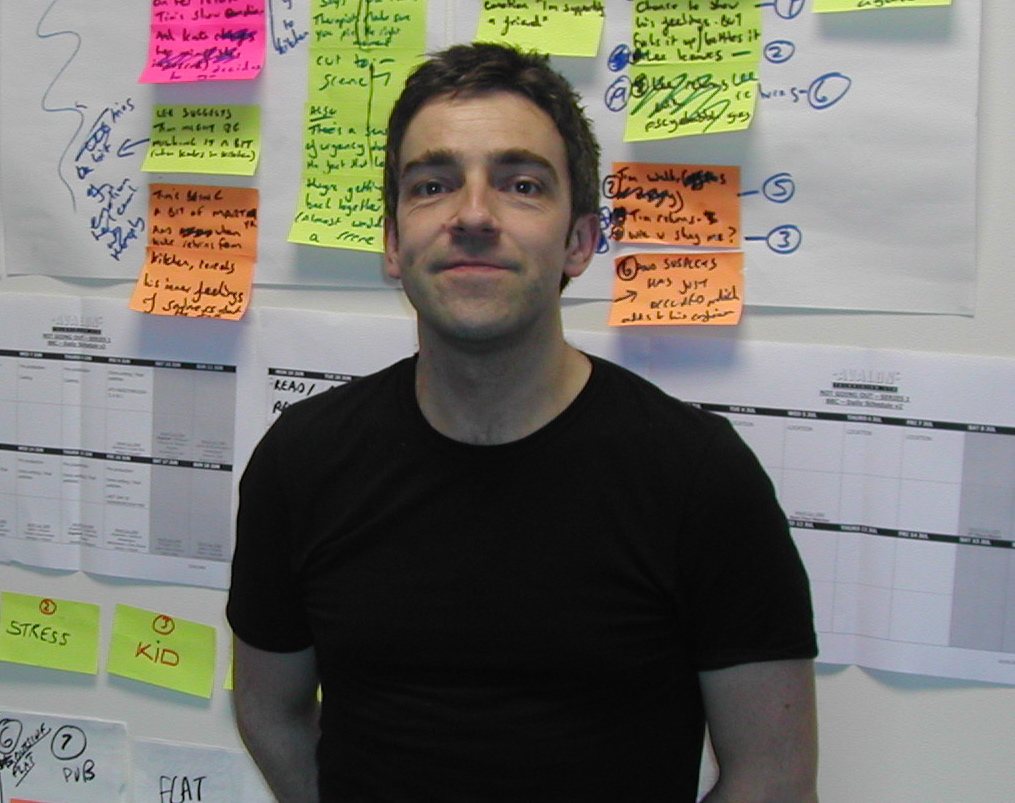
Andrew Collins

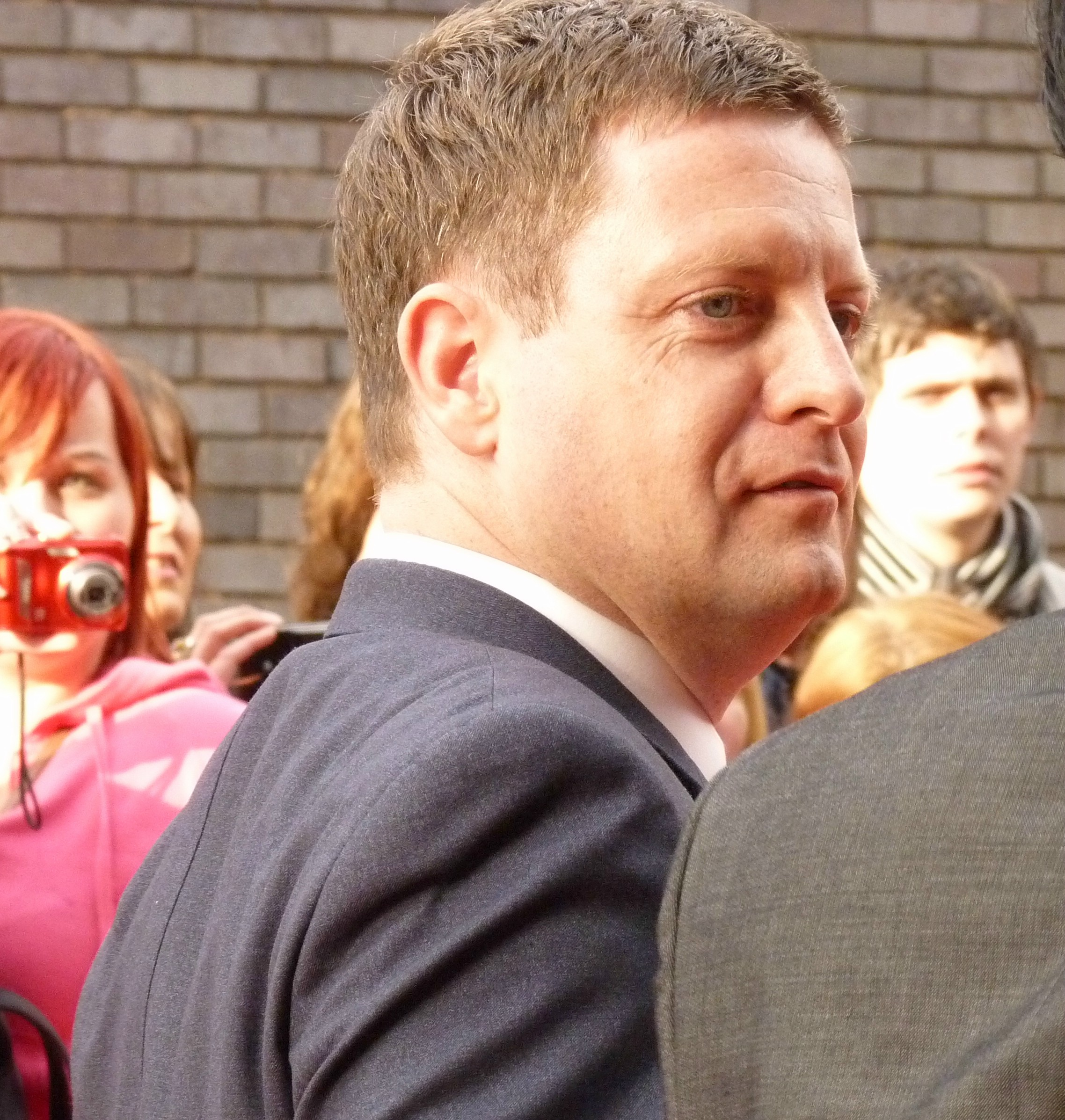
Bryan Kirkwood

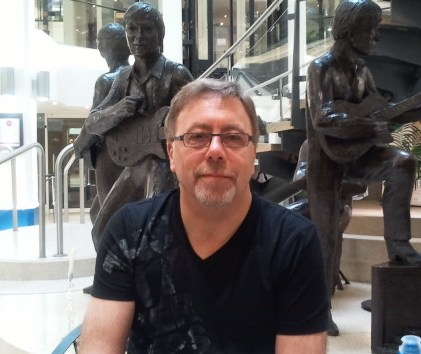
Fred Lawless

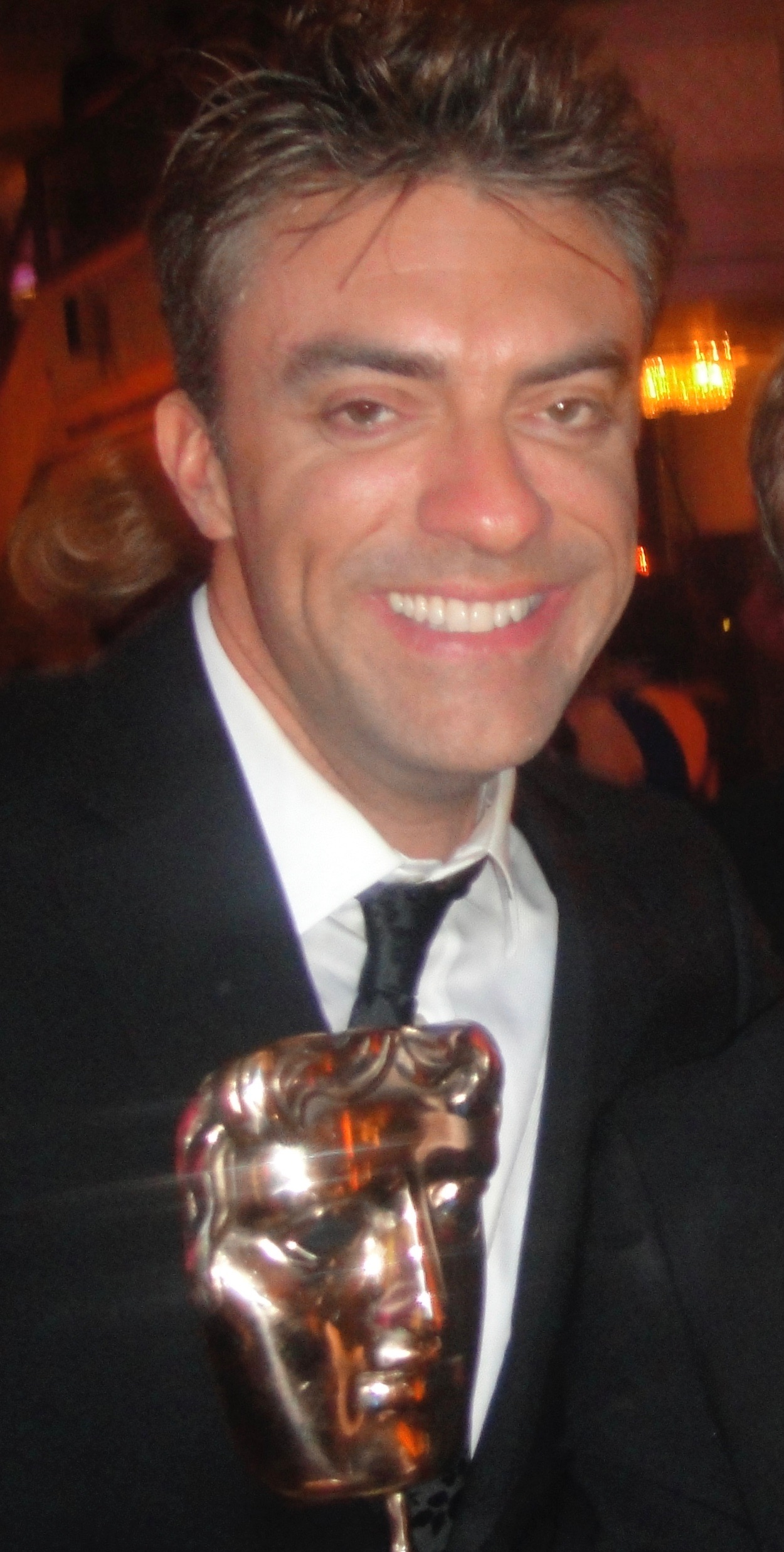
Daran Little

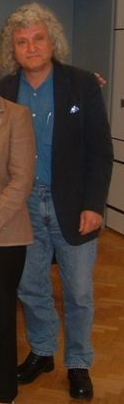
Bill Lyons

- Sally Abbott (2009–2013)
- Juliet Ace (1985–1990)
- Dare Aiyegbayo (2007–2009, 2014–2017)
- Abby Ajayi (2008)
- Robin Allen (1987)
- Ross Anderson (2003)
- Carey Andrews (2000–)
- Chris Anstis (1985)
- Simon Ashdown (1995–2013, 2017–)
- Simon J Ashford (2000–2003)
- Al Hunter Ashton (1986, 1999–2002, 2006)
- David Ashton (1985–1986, 1988)
- Liane Aukin (1985–1990, 1996)
- Fraser Ayres (2021)
- Samina Baig (2008–2009)
- Perrie Balthazar (2010–2013)
- Jessica Barnes (2021–)
- John Barrington (1986)
- Matthew Barry (2011–2015, 2017–2018)
- Tony Basgallop (1996–2002)
- Peter Batt (1985–1986)
- Katie Baxendale (1999)
- Michael Begley (2010–2013, 2019–2020)
- Sonali Bhattacharyya (2009)
- Gupreet Bhatti (2001–2004)
- Tom Bidwell (2010)
- Tony Bilbow (1986)
- Lucy Blincoe (2002–2006)
- Helen Blizard (1994–1997, 2000–2004)
- Chris Boiling (2006)
- Roy Boulter (2011–2012)
- Gavin James Bower (2014–2016)
- Abi Bown (2007–2008)
- Sandy Boyce (2004)
- Susan Boyd (1985–1998, 2000–2004)
- Carrie-Anne Brackstone (2009)
- Gil Brailey (unknown)
- Colin Brake (1992–1995)
- John Brennan (2000)
- Doug Briggs (1998–2000)
- Martin Brocklebank (2010)
- Ray Brooking (2009)
- Edel Brosnan (2000)
- Matthew Broughton (2011)
- Gary Brown (2000–2003, 2005)
- David Joss Buckley (1995–1997, 2002–2004, 2014)
- Andrew Burrell (2022)
- Robert Butler (2016–2018)
- Paul Campbell (2008–2010, 2014)
- Johnny Candon (2018–2020, 2024–)
- Guido Casale (1986)
- Steve Casey (2021)
- Brendan J. Cassin (1990–1992)
- Mark Catley (2006–2007, 2011–2012, 2017–2019)
- Maureen Chadwick (1987)
- John Chambers (1992)
- Tom Chaplin (2007)
- Scott Cherry (1995)
- Gaby Chiappe (2002–2005)
- Nazrin Choudhury (2003–2004)
- Jaden Clark (2004–2010, 2014–2018)
- Angela Clarke (2007)
- Madeleine Clifford (1995, 2017–2022)
- Mark Clompus (1999–2009)
- Phil Clymer (2017–2018)
- Paul Coates (2004–2005)
- Nathan Cockerill (2008–2009)
- Lin Coghlan (2002–2005)
- Bridget Colgan (2003–2010)
- Len Collin (1994–1997, 1999, 2002)
- Andrew Collins (2000–2002)
- Deborah Cook (1990–1994, 1997, 1999–2006)
- Trish Cooke (1991)
- Shirley Cooklin (1987)
- Ben Cooper (1998–1999)
- Matthew Cooper (2003)
- Gem Copping (2020–2022, 2025–)
- Angela Corner (2009–2010)
- Andrew Cornish (2006)
- Daisy Coulam (2007, 2009, 2011–2014)
- Julia Cranney (2021)
- John Crisp (1985, 1989)
- Nick Crittenden (1996–1997)
- Graeme Curry (1989)
- Gina Dallow (2013)
- Lynne Dallow (1996–1998, 2000–2002, 2004, 2006, 2014–)
- Sarah Daniels (1987, 1989–1990, 2003)
- Jonathan David (1995)
- Richard Davidson (2004–2010, 2014–2017, 2019–)
- Lesley Davies (1991)
- Mark Davies Markham (1995–1996, 2000)
- Jamie Davis (2022–)
- Jenny Davis (2021)
- Linda Dearsley (1990–1991)
- Oliver Dennis (1999–2001)
- Tony Dennis (1985)
- Emma Dennis-Edwards (2021)
- John Derrek (unknown)
- Emilia di Girolamo (2008–2010)
- Ann Marie Di Mambro (2002–2007, 2011)
- Raymond Dixon (1996)
- Paul Dodgson (2000–2001)
- Katie Douglas (2012–2017, 2020–)
- Paul Doust (1989–1990)
- Bev Doyle (1985–1986)
- John Drew (1988)
- Harry Duffin (1985)
- Shaun Duggan (2003–2006)
- Polly Eden (2005–2007)
- Sean Egan (1990–1991)
- Michael Ellis (1990–1991)
- Kenny Emson (2012, 2018)
- Tony Etchells (1993–1995, 2001–2005)
- Fiona Evans (2008–2010)
- Lisa Evans (1991–1993, 1996–2000)
- Matthew (Matt) Evans (2007–2017)
- Robert Evans (2018)
- Dana Fainaru (2006–2007, 2014, 2016, 2019–2020)
- Lilie Ferrari (1992–1993, 1997, 1999, 2001)
- Chris Fewtrell (1996)
- Alison Fisher (1995–1996, 2000–2010, 2016)
- Nick Fisher (2014)
- Shannon Fitzgerald (unknown)
- Rachel Flowerday (2007–2010, 2015)
- Nadine Flynn (2024–)
- Anthony Forbes (1992)
- Judy Forshaw (1992–1992)
- Ben Foster (1999)
- David Richard Fox (1995–1996, 2007)
- Gilly Fraser (1985–1990)
- Spenser Frearson (2006–2010, 2014, 2016)
- Josh Freedman Berthoud (2014–2016)
- Jane Galletly (1998–1989)
- Frances Galleymore (1985)
- Lucy Gannon (2011–2012)
- Philip Gawthorne (2009)
- Valerie Georgeson (1985)
- Lisa Gifford (2017–2018, 2024–)
- Julia Gilbert (2006–2010)
- Rob Gittins (1986, 1988–1991, 1996–)
- Robert Goldsbrough (2014–2015)
- Emma Goodwin (2005–2006)
- Marcus Goodwin (2004)
- Aileen Goss (2005)
- Duncan Gould (1992–1993)
- Matthew Graham (1992–1995, 2000–2002)
- Tony Graham (2002)
- Wendy Granditer (2005–2020)
- Niall Grant-Rowlands (2026–)
- Jess Green (2021–2022)
- Tony Grounds (1990)
- Tahsin Güner (2011)
- Tanika Gupta (1999–2000)
- Amy Guyler (2020–2025)
- Sasha Hails (2006)
- Jahvel Hall (2022, 2024–)
- Stephen Hallett (2008)
- Peter J. Hammond (1990)
- Billy Hamon (1985–1987, 1996)
- Orla Hannon (2022–)
- Rebekah Harrison (2021–2022, 2025–)
- Matt Hartley (2021)
- Kay Hartnett (2010)
- Jim Hawkins (1985)
- Sarah-Louise Hawkins (2002)
- Catherine Hayes (1995)
- Kate Henry (2005)
- John Hickman (2018)
- Nicholas Hicks-Beach (1995–2001, 2003–2012)
- Tom Higgins (2012–2013)
- Lindsey Hill (1999)
- Mark Hiser (2003–2010)
- Ming Ho (2001–2004)
- Andrew Holden (1991, 1996)
- Tony Holland (1985–1989)
- Jane Hollowood (1985–1989)
- Matthew Holt (1990)
- Patrick Homes (2011–2015, 2018–2019)
- Julia Honour (a pseudonym; 1998, 2000–2003, 2005–2008, 2010–2011, 2013–2018)
- Kevin Hood (1995)
- Sarah Hooper (2016–2017)
- David Hopkins (1986–1987)
- Gary Hopkins (1989)
- Eirene Houston (2008–2009)
- Charlie Humphreys (1985–1992)
- Troy Hunter (2023–)
- Matthew Hurt (2018–2022)
- Gerry Huxham (1985–1991, 1996)
- Mark Illis (1998)
- Paul Jenkins (2007)
- Michael Jenner (2005–2008)
- Mark Johnson (2003–2004)
- Cat Jones (2015–2016)
- Davey Jones (2015–2019)
- Kelly Jones (2013–2014)
- Lawrie Jordan (2025–)
- Tony Jordan (1989–2006, 2008, 2018)
- Lisselle Kayla (1994–2002)
- Michael Keane (2022)
- Emer Kenny (2012–2014)
- Ian Kershaw (2007, 2017)
- Stephen Keyworth (2007–2008, 2010)
- Yasmeen Khan (2019–)
- Bryan Kirkwood (2022–)
- Lauren Klee (2009–)
- Liz Lake (2014–2017)
- Kit Lambert (2014–2015)
- Natasha Langridge (2011)
- Fred Lawless (1999)
- David Lawrence (2011)
- Philip Lawrence (2019–2020)
- Zeddy Lawrence (1996)
- Karen Laws (2008–2010)
- Pete Lawson (2008–)
- Richard Lazarus (2007–2015)
- Jessica Lea (2015–2017)
- Jenny Lecoat (1998–2002, 2004–2005)
- Kolton Lee (1992–1993)
- Wendy Lee (2000)
- Michael Levine (2009)
- Jack Lewis (1986)
- John Lewis (1988–1989)
- Geoff Lindsey (2006)
- Daran Little (2010–)
- David Lloyd (2003–2006)
- Steph Lloyd Jones (2007, 2013–2014)
- Paul Logue (2012)
- Anji Loman Field (1999–2003)
- Amber Lone (2021)
- Doug Lucie (2006)
- Bill Lyons (1985–1989)
- Joanne Maguire (1993–2000, 2002, 2004–2006)
- Lydia Marchant (2021–)
- Paul Mari (2009–2014)
- Jane Marlow (2010–2011)
- Sharon Marshall (2011–2015, 2023–2025)
- Rosemary Mason (1985–1990)
- Peter Mattessi (2011–2012, 2014–)
- John Maynard (1986–1990)
- Stephen McAteer (1995, 2003)
- Barry McCarthy (1995–1997, 1999, 2001–2007)
- Pippa McCarthy (2003–2007)
- Glen McCoy (1985–1986, 1999–2000)
- Conway McDermott (2021–)
- James McDermott (2021, 2023–)
- Alan McDonald (1995)
- Tony McHale (1985–1999)
- Clare McIntyre (1998)
- James McIntyre (2005)
- Peter McKenna (2011–2012, 2018)
- David McManus (2016)
- Lisa McMullin (2019–2020)
- Jane McNulty (2003–2005)
- Pete McTighe (2011–2013)
- Andrew Mettam (2014–2015)
- Helen Millar (1991–1992)
- Claire Miller (2021–2023)
- Danny Miller (2001)
- Hugh Miller (1985)
- Shelley Miller (1995)
- John Milne (1990–1991)
- Natalie Mitchell (2013–2017, 2019–2024)
- Dominique Moloney (2007–2009)
- Ann Monks (2004)
- Grazyna Monvid (1991)
- David Moor (2022–)
- Celia Morgan (2021)
- Stuart Morris (1996)
- Simon Moss (2003)
- Robin Mukherjee (1990, 2001–2005)
- Christine Murphy (2002)
- Angela Murray (2018)
- Chris Murray (1999–2000, 2007)
- Jonathan Myerson (1993)
- Tom Needham (2011–2012)
- Rachael New (2015)
- Lorraine Newman (2018–)
- Alun Nipper (2004–2005)
- D.A. Nixon (2022)
- Nk'iru Njoku (2025–)
- Carol Noble (1997–1998)
- Simon Norman (2018–2019, 2023–)
- Emma Norry (2022)
- Rory John Nugent (2024–)
- John Oakden (1986)
- Chris O'Connell (2005)
- Tom Ogden (2004)
- Jo O'Keefe (1997–2000, 2002–2004)
- Sam Olver (2004)
- Jesse O'Mahoney (2010–2018)
- Debbie O'Malley (2004–2005)
- Tim O'Mara (2000)
- Jonny O'Neill (2014–)
- Sian Orrells (1994–1995)
- Deborah Palmer (2022–2023)
- Carol Parker (2018)
- Chris Parker (2006–2010)
- Jayshree Patel (2024)
- Jyoti Patel (1990–1992, 1994)
- Charlotte Pattullo (2025–)
- James Payne (2002–2009, 2014–2015, 2025–)
- Fiona Peek (2011, 2013)
- Marc Peirson (1999–2000)
- Christopher Penfold (1990–1991)
- Julian Perkins (1998–2001, 2004)
- Ashley Pharoah (1991–1994)
- Sarah Phelps (2002–2007, 2015–2016)
- Winsome Pinnock (1990)
- Rachel Pole (1996–2000, 2004)
- Laura Poliakoff (2013–2017)
- Bo Poraj (2014–2015, 2018–2019)
- Jeff Povey (1992–1995, 2000–2024)
- Emma Prentice (1996)
- Tim Price (2010–2011)
- Marc Pye (2005, 2012–2014)
- Paul Quiney (2012–2017)
- Bradley Quirk (2006)
- Lena Rae (2008, 2010, 2019)
- Ayshe Raif (1987, 1989–1991)
- Darren Rapier (2015–2016)
- Shazia Rashid (2010)
- Andrew Rattenbury (2016)
- Christopher Reason (1994–1998, 2000–2003, 2005–2019)
- Nick Reed (1999)
- Anya Reiss (2014–2016, 2018)
- Kim Revill (2010–2015, 2017–)
- Leo Richardson (2014–2017)
- Gillian Richmond (1987–1997, 1999–2006, 2008–2010, 2014–2017)
- Jake Riddell (2005–2012, 2019)
- Carl Rigg (1987)
- Bob Ritchie (2003–2005)
- Michael Robartes (1985–1989, 1992–1995)
- Bea Roberts (2024, 2026–)
- Heather Robson (2011–2012)
- Paul Rose (2003)
- Kevin Rundle (2020–)
- Christopher Russell (1985)
- Michael Russell (1990–1991)
- Lee Saczak (2021–)
- Nick Saltrese (2001, 2019)
- Julia Schofield (1986)
- Martin Scott (2018)
- Dan Sefton (2001–2002)
- Jon Sen (2014–2015)
- Atiha Sen Gupta (2020–2021, 2023–2024)
- Rashida Seriki (2021)
- Craig Sheldon (2018)
- Barrie Shore (1991–1996, 1998–2000)
- Tony Simon (2000)
- Jez Simons (1990–1992, 1993)
- Margaret Simpson (1991)
- Helen Slavin (1995–1996, 2004)
- Laura Sleep (2022–)
- Patrea Smallacombe (2007–2009)
- Al Smith (2007, 2009)
- Christopher Smith (2003)
- Kathrine Smith (2006, 2016–2017)
- Maya Sondhi (2016)
- Si Spencer (2000–2005)
- Sumerah Srivastav (2016–2019)
- Danny Stack (2009)
- James Stevenson (1995)
- Mark Stevenson (2013–2020, 2022–)
- Tim Stimpson (2017)
- Richard Stockwell (2000–2002)
- Alex Straker (2016–2017)
- Stephen Stratford (1996)
- Trevor Suthers (1999)
- Kirstie Swain (2012)
- Allan Swift (1985–1986, 1989)
- Andrew Taft (1999–2005, 2009–2010)
- Ben Tagoe (2012)
- Sally Tatchell (2013–2014)
- Gert Thomas (2006–2009)
- Mark Thomas (1988)
- Paul Matthew Thompson (2012–2013)
- Sydney Thompson (2018–2019)
- Chloe Timms (2026–)
- Joanna Toye (2017)
- Stephen Tredre (1997)
- Catherine Tregenna (2003)
- Angela Turvey (1995)
- Gary Tyler (2003)
- Ben Vanstone (2005–2007)
- Simon Vinnicombe (2010)
- Paul Walker (2018–2019)
- Nick Warburton (2002–2004)
- Thea Ward (2018, 2020)
- Julie Wassmer (1995–2008)
- Katerina Watson (2021–2022)
- Laura Watson (2005–2009)
- Poz Watson (2021–2023, 2026–)
- Alison Watt (1999–2000, 2005)
- Katharine Way (2001–2002)
- Steve Waye (1990–1991)
- Chris Webb (2000–2002)
- Paula Webb (1996, 1999–2002)
- Mark Wheatley (1987–1989)
- Patrick Wilde (2007)
- Susan Wilkins (2006)
- Lindsay Williams (2012–2015)
- Rob Williams (2010, 2012)
- Nicola Wilson (2011–2012)
- Rebecca Wojciechowski (2009–2014, 2019–2020)
- Annie Wood (1994–2004, 2006–2010)
- Pete Jordi Wood (2014)
- Sophie Woolley (2021)
- Kate Wright (1999–2000)
- Colin Wyatt (2002–2010, 2012–2020)
- Michael Wynne (2008–2009)
- Arnold Yarrow (1992–1994)
- Jeff Young (2007–2008)
- Justin Young (2008)
- Richard Zajdlic (1994–1995, 2006–2010)
