= Episode 4466 =

EastEnders episode

- EastEnders episode
- Billy Mitchell lights the Olympic Torch.
- Episode no.: Episode 4466
- Directed by: Clive Arnold
- Written by: Matt Evans
- Original air date: 23 July 2012
- Running time: 30 minutes

Episode chronology
| ← Previous; Episode 4465 | Next → Episode 4467 |

Episode 4466 of the BBC soap opera EastEnders was broadcast on BBC One on 23 July 2012, between 9pm and 9.30pm. It was written by Matt Evans, directed by Clive Arnold, and executively produced by Lorraine Newman. It included seven minutes of live footage, during which the character of Billy Mitchell, played by Perry Fenwick, carried the Olympic Torch as an official torch bearer as part of the official torch relay for the London 2012 Olympic Games, and Lola Pearce, played by Danielle Harold, gave birth to her daughter. The storyline for the episode was announced in November 2011, with the fact that Lola would give birth being reported in July 2012. The episode received positive reviews, with Karen Edwards from Heat calling it "special" and praising Harold's performance, and Jane Rackham from the Radio Times calling it "highly topical", though Boyd Hilton from Heat felt that Billy's torch bearing was a "gimmick" and the whole episode should have been live. It was watched by an average of 7.32 million people on its initial broadcast. It was accompanied by a special, one-off BBC Red Button episode called "Billy's Olympic Nightmare". The episode received an All About Soap award nomination for Best Episode, under the name "Billy and the Olympic Torch", and a British Soap Award nomination for "Spectacular Scene of the Year", both in 2013.

== Plot ==
Selected as a torch bearer for the 2012 London Olympics, Billy Mitchell (Perry Fenwick) is stuck on the London Underground with members of his local football team because someone pulled the emergency stop when an argument broke out. The train starts but police are waiting at the tube station and will not let them through. Billy manages to escape, and frantically tries to get ready for the torch. Meanwhile, Billy's granddaughter, Lola Pearce (Danielle Harold), is in labour in a local fast food restaurant, refusing an ambulance, and refusing to give birth until she knows Billy has carried the torch and can be there. After some delays, Billy is able to carry the torch, watched by his friends and neighbours. He then hears that Lola is in labour, so rushes to the restaurant, where Cora Cross (Ann Mitchell) delivers the baby, a girl.

== Cast ==
- Perry Fenwick as Billy Mitchell
- Tameka Empson as Kim Fox
- Danielle Harold as Lola Pearce
- Ann Mitchell as Cora Cross
- Rudolph Walker as Patrick Trueman
- Joshua Pascoe as Ben Mitchell
- Jamie Borthwick as Jay Mitchell
- Ricky Norwood as Arthur "Fatboy" Chubb
- Aykut Hilmi as Nico Papadopoulos
- Shane Richie as Alfie Moon
- Jamie Foreman as Derek Branning
- Scott Maslen as Jack Branning
- Jake Wood as Max Branning
- Steve McFadden as Phil Mitchell
- Linda Henry as Shirley Carter
- Hetti Bywater as Lucy Beale
- Charlie Brooks as Janine Butcher
- Jessie Wallace as Kat Moon
- Gillian Wright as Jean Slater
- Chucky Venn as Ray Dixon
- Tony Discipline as Tyler Moon
- Steve John Shepherd as Michael Moon
- Nina Wadia as Zainab Khan
- Nitin Ganatra as Masood Ahmed
- Jo Joyner as Tanya Cross
- Matt Lapinskas as Anthony Moon
- Rita Simons as Roxy Mitchell
- Himesh Patel as Tamwar Masood
- James Forde as Liam Butcher
- Danny Brown as Harry
- Diane Parish as Denise Fox

== Announcement ==
In November 2011, storylines show Billy selected as a torch bearer for the 2012 Summer Olympics. At the same time, it was announced that in reality, Fenwick would carry the torch through the fictional setting of Albert Square, with live footage shown in the second episode on 23 July 2012. London 2012 chairman Sebastian Coe said: "The announcement is a great addition to the Olympic Torch Relay Route. I'm sure the people of Walford will now start planning their celebrations. Along with people right round the UK, the residents of Albert Square will be getting involved to make this their moment to shine." Fenwick said, "When we first discussed the storyline, my initial thought was that I'll now have to get fit. While this may be a fictional one-off for Billy, it's a real once-in-a-lifetime opportunity for me and I am thrilled that Walford and Albert Square will be part of this amazing event." He later added: "I think it's great that EastEnders has done this storyline, because it would be totally wrong and remiss not to acknowledge the biggest event in our lifetime, which technically—in fictional land—is five minutes up the road from Walford." Roger Mosey, the BBC's director for London 2012, said, "I like this, in media terms, that it's the real torch, the real procession going to Walford. It will be live when it goes there and so potentially you can broadcast EastEnders for three or four minutes on the News Channel because the torch being in Albert Square is a news event. I like the idea of the real torch being in a fictional place."

On 15 July 2012, it was announced that a seven-minute live segment at the end of episode would show Billy taking part in the relay, followed by Lola giving birth to her daughter, while Billy rushes to be there. Harold would become only the second actress to act out a birth during a live episode of a soap opera, following Coronation Street's Jennie McAlpine (Fiz Stape) in the live 50th anniversary episode broadcast in December 2010. An insider from the show stated, "No one has tried anything like this on EastEnders live before so it is a real challenge to get the emotion of the situation right. It will be the toughest thing Danielle has done in her acting career."

== Production ==
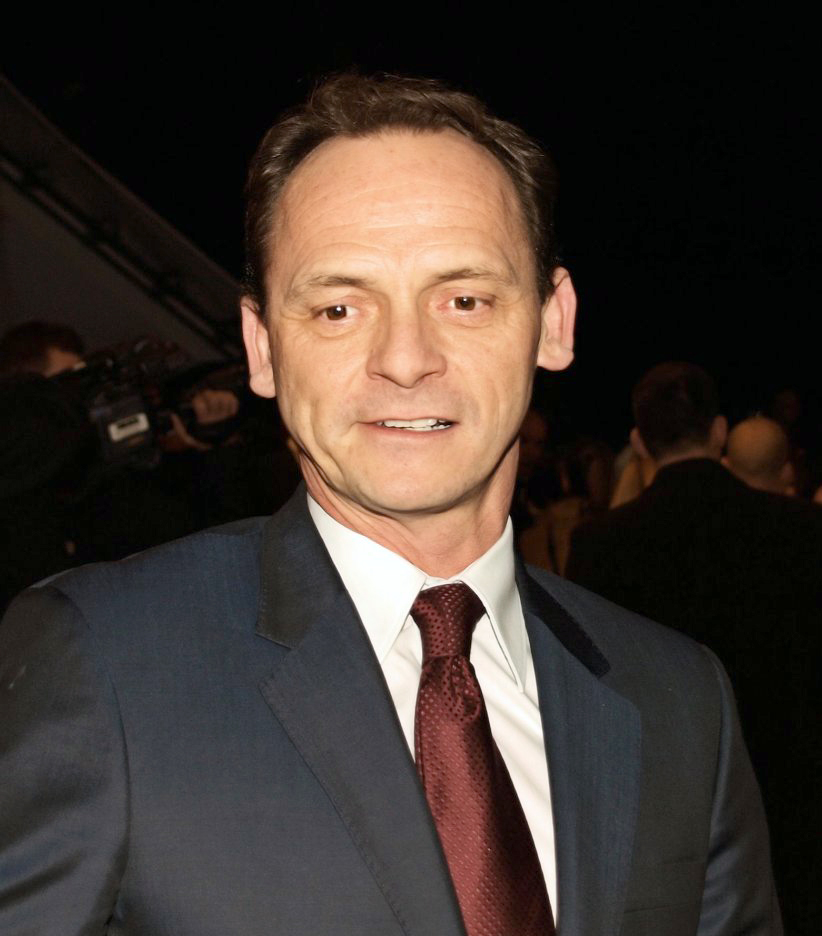
Perry Fenwick (Billy Mitchell, pictured) said he was "worried" about carrying the Olympic Flame in the live section of the episode.

Carl Doran, the creative head of the Torch coverage across the BBC, revealed in a blog on BBC Online, that the London Organising Committee of the Olympic and Paralympic Games (LOCOG) and EastEnders production team had worked for two years to organise the flame being shown live on EastEnders, saying "We've been looking into the practicalities and many challenges of getting the torch to Walford in time for an EastEnders slot while it makes a whistle-stop tour through London's 32 boroughs in the final week of the 70-day journey around the UK. We also discussed the idea of trying to record it on tape like a traditional EastEnders episode as well, but we always wanted it to be as authentic as possible and so it will be the real torch and flame and it will happen live. It's very exciting, and even more so because live broadcasting adds an extra set of challenges to a top drama."

Rehearsals for the live section of the episode started on 21 July 2012 and full dress rehearsals on 22 July, though there was some tentative rehearsal time before that when they were also busy filming other episodes. Fenwick said of his rehearsals, "Summer arrives just in time for me to complete my 24th circuit of Albert Square and I'm sweltering. On the plus side, I'm starting to see abs, have buns of steel and the show is looking good too!" He had to check the route for potholes beforehand, as well as making sure he knew his lines, and said he was looking forward to it being over. He was worried about carrying the torch during the live broadcast, as he may have dropped it or it could have gone out. He stated that he, as an actor, was feeling more nervous than his character.

Harold said of the rehearsals, "I have known about this live episode for such a long time but all of a sudden it has crept up on us. I am really nervous but now we have started rehearsing, I am feeling equally excited. It will definitely be an experience and I hope Perry runs smoothly!" She also said she was "terrified" of acting out the birth, saying she would prefer to give birth in real life. She said that filming the pre-recorded labour scenes meant she "was knackered after screaming and crying and pretending to push all day." In an interview with Digital Spy, she said that she was "really, really nervous" and that the prospect of acting the birth was "very scary", but added, "I really appreciate that they've given me the opportunity, especially considering that I haven't been here at EastEnders for that long. It's really nice that they've trusted me with it, so hopefully I'll do it justice! It's a once-in-a-lifetime opportunity, so I'm keeping my fingers crossed that it'll go well." To help prepare, she asked several women for advice, including her mother, and was told "It's the worst pain you can ever imagine!" She found it "quite difficult" to imagine what it would be like to act out as she has no children, but had watched Channel 4 show One Born Every Minute to help, as she did not want to "overdo the scene or make it look really fake."

The episode was part of the official torch relay, and Fenwick ran with the real torch protection team dressed as an official torch bearer. The torch made a special detour from London to the EastEnders set in the BBC Elstree Centre, Borehamwood. Fenwick's route saw him carry the torch from the fictional location of Bridge Street, past The Queen Victoria public house and around Albert Square.

The majority of the episode was filmed in advance and the whole episode was directed by Clive Arnold, who said, "As the only drama asked to be involved with the Olympic Torch Relay, it is a huge honour for EastEnders and for everyone involved—a truly once in a lifetime opportunity. I was so excited and thrilled when I was asked to be part of the episode and I know that every member of cast and crew feel exactly the same way." The live scenes used 19 cameras, along with the 31 regular cast members, plus 11 child cast members and at least 450 extras. As the programme switched from pre-recorded to live scenes, Fenwick, in character, winked at the camera and said "Here we go!" Part of the relay was shown on BBC News.

== "Billy's Olympic Nightmare" ==
"Billy's Olympic Nightmare" is a one-off spin-off episode of EastEnders, broadcast via the BBC Red Button on 16 July 2012, to tie in with the episode where Billy is a torch bearer. This episode features Billy missing several promotional events. The episode stars comedian Omid Djalili as a cab driver named Hercules, plus athletes Kelly Holmes, Tessa Sanderson, Kriss Akabusi, Mark Foster, newsreader Sonali Shah, and television presenters Matt Baker and Alex Jones as themselves. Perry said of the spin-off, "Filming this was like a dress rehearsal of my worst nightmare! It was strange filming at West Ham as again, like Billy, I feel it's my home. I'm over the moon to be carrying the torch through Walford, and working with the likes of Dame Kelly Holmes has made me even more excited to do so!" Fenwick revealed that Djalili improvised some of his lines.

Billy is set to carry the Olympic Torch through Walford and has 30 minutes before he has to collect the torch. Billy takes a taxicab to the BBC be interviewed on The One Show but discovers that the other torchbearers have already been interviewed. He is chased out of the studio by a security guard. Billy's next stop is Wembley Stadium and again he discovers the torchbearers have already left. Billy then goes to West Ham United F.C. and catches up with the other torchbearers but unfortunately Billy has lost his pass and is not allowed in. His taxi driver, Hercules, appears with Billy's pass and he takes part in the celebrations. Billy then wakes up in the hair and beauty salon in Walford and it turns out he was dreaming.

== Reception ==
=== Pre-broadcast ===
Jane Rackham from the Radio Times called the episode "highly topical", while Tony Stewart from the Daily Mirror said: "With London hosting the Games, this is an appropriate and ambitious story for [East]Enders to tackle", and called both Fenwick and Harold "superb". Boyd Hilton from Heat said Billy carrying the Olympic torch was a "gimmick", and said the entire episode should have been live, whilst Heat's Karen Edwards said Harold acting out a live birth would be "amazing", adding, "much respect goes out to Danielle who will be working hard to make the episode a success."

=== Post-broadcast ===
Talking about Billy being stuck on the train, the Elstree & Borehamwood Times wrote: "Viewers sat biting their nails on tenterhooks, waiting to see if he would make it back to Walford in time." Karen Edwards from Heat called the episode "quite the special night" and said that it was "Not an easy task" for Fenwick. She called his wink "cheeky" and "brilliant", saying it "just showed how real the whole thing was". She added that it was "emotional" to watch, and said that Harold "did the best fake birth screaming we've seen in a long while. [...] Pretty impressive work, we're sure you'll agree." Matt Brito from Comedy Central UK said the fact that nothing went wrong in the live broadcast was "boring". Laura Morgan from All About Soap said the live segment was "seamless", saying it deserved a gold medal for "the best thing on TV last night". She said she loved Fenwick's wink to the camera and praised Harold, saying the birth finished off the live segment "perfectly", adding: "Hats off to relative newbie Danielle Harold (aka Lola) for making the birth scenes look so realistic on live TV... That's no mean feat!" She also said it was "the perfect way to kick off the 2012 Olympic Games". After the episode, five of the ten top trending topics on social networking site Twitter related to the live event.

=== Ratings ===
Overnight ratings showed that the episode was watched by 7.32 million people, a 31% share of the total viewing audience for that time, and the live section peaked at 7.9 million (32.6%). A repeat on BBC Three received overnight ratings of 1.04 million (6.1%). However, this was down on the first episode shown that day, which received 7.59 million viewers, and rival soap opera Coronation Street, whose two episodes broadcast on ITV that day received overnight ratings of 7.68 million and 7.8 million respectively. Official ratings from the Broadcasters' Audience Research Board showed that the episode gained 8.11 million viewers. It was the fourth most-watched programme on BBC One that week and the fifth most-watched programme on UK television that week, beaten by the previous episode of EastEnders, the first episode of Coronation Street broadcast on that day, and the following Friday's broadcasts of the 2012 Summer Olympics opening ceremony and opening ceremony countdown. The BBC Three repeat officially received 1.1 million viewers.

=== Award nominations ===
In February 2013, the episode was nominated for an All About Soap award for Best Episode, under the title "Billy and the Olympic Torch". In April 2013, the episode was nominated for "Spectacular Scene of the Year" at The British Soap Awards, for Billy carrying the torch.

== See also ==
- "EastEnders Live"
