= Pretty Baby.... =

- EastEnders episode
- Dot Branning (played by June Brown) records a message for her husband Jim Branning (John Bardon)
- Episode no.: Episode 3518
- Directed by: Clive Arnold
- Written by: Tony Jordan
- Production code: LDXO596J
- Original air date: 31 January 2008
- Running time: 28 minutes

Episode chronology
← Previous; Episode 3517	Next → Episode 3519

"Pretty Baby...." is an episode of the British television soap opera EastEnders, broadcast on BBC One on 31 January 2008. It is the only EastEnders episode to feature just one character and the first of its kind in soap. It was written by Tony Jordan, directed by Clive Arnold and produced by Diederick Santer. The episode features Dot Branning, played by June Brown, recording a message for her husband Jim Branning (John Bardon), who is in hospital recovering from a stroke, reflecting Bardon's real-life stroke, which saw him written out of the show and allowed the opportunity for the single-hander to arise. Jordan's scripting was inspired by Samuel Beckett's Krapp's Last Tape.

The episode was watched by 8.86 million viewers and received mixed reviews from critics. Brown's acting attracted praise, with both Nancy Banks-Smith of The Guardian and Mark Wright of The Stage doubting that any other actress would have been capable of carrying Dot's monologue. Banks-Smith and The Times's Tim Teeman questioned Dot's characterisation, and Teeman ultimately found the episode "much-loved character overkill", while Gerard O'Donovan of The Daily Telegraph called Brown's performance "mesmerising" but said the episode was "fuss over nothing". Brown received a British Academy Television Award nomination for Best Actress in 2009 for her performance in the episode.

== Plot ==
It is night time, and as Dot Branning (June Brown) makes herself a cup of cocoa at home, she records a message on a tape recorder for her husband Jim Branning (John Bardon), who is in hospital recovering from a stroke. Dot tells Jim everyone is missing him, and that she has been dreading recording the message. She talks about her Christian faith and remembers her childhood, her first marriage to Charlie Cotton (Christopher Hancock) and her friendship with Ethel Skinner (Gretchen Franklin). She talks about when she was evacuated to Wales during the Second World War and how she did not cry when she left her mother. She says she was happy moving away to live with her guardians, a Welsh couple named Gwen and Will, as they made her feel special, and recalls the happiest day of her life. She remembers how Will would sing "Pretty Baby" to her at night, but says since then everyone she has cared about has died. She finishes by telling Jim that the hospital staff want to send him home, but she fears she will not be able to cope and concludes she is better on her own.

== Production ==
"It'll be a treat for EastEnders viewers to watch one of Albert Square's longest-serving and most cared about characters reminisce about her past."

— EastEnders spokesperson on "Pretty Baby...."

On 14 November 2007, it was announced that former EastEnders scriptwriter Tony Jordan had been contacted by Controller of BBC Drama Production John Yorke with an idea for an episode and that Jordan had returned to EastEnders having written the script for the episode. The single-hander episode was announced the next day, the first episode of any soap opera to feature just one character. Jordan had wanted to write a solo episode for EastEnders – well known for its two-hander episodes – for some time, but the opportunity had never arisen until Bardon had a stroke in real life, which was reflected in storylines when Jim was said to have suffered a stroke when visiting relatives off screen. Cast and crew were grateful for the opportunity to make the episode but were aware it had come about due to the suffering of somebody they loved. Brown was initially sceptical that her character could carry an entire episode by herself, but stated that Dot has a lot of history so there was a lot to call upon.

When writing the script, Jordan had in his head an image of Samuel Beckett's play Krapp's Last Tape. The script was 27 pages long, instead of the normal average of about 65, due to lack of stage directions. Clive Arnold was asked to direct the episode, and was allowed to input more into the script than would be normal, which he said was due to his good working relationship with Jordan. Jordan also gave Brown the opportunity to change anything she wanted to. Arnold was careful that the episode would not alienate regular EastEnders viewers by making it too left of field, ensuring that it would be recognisable as an EastEnders episode, and made sure viewers would identify with the character, emphasising her state of mind with visual links. Brown found her lines for the episode easy to learn as they "flowed" and the script was well written. Arnold and Brown worked closely together, rehearsing and working on the script in detail. Rehearsals went on for a number of weeks and after being able to judge the pace of the episode, Arnold was able to introduce choreography and stage directions. He stated that the rehearsals were invaluable as he, Brown and Jordan could work together to develop and tweak the script as they progressed. He broke the script down into scenes to aid Brown's performance by giving her one scene to concentrate on per day of filming.

The episode was filmed over a number of afternoons at the end of 2007, with each day's filming beginning with a repeat of the last section from the previous day, to help blend each scene into the next. It was filmed with a "single camera mentality" but with up to five cameras running to give Brown a "freedom of performance away from hitting marks or favouring one particular camera position." This also helped in the case of technical problems, meaning that second takes were not necessary. Brown cried when she read the script and though she did not cry during filming, she had expected to, planning to pause the tape recorder if she did. She stated that the most difficult part of the script was the line about Jim being "here, but not here" because she felt that way about Bardon. Arnold admitted to "[wiping] away the tears" many times and noted that several other crew cried, and that one of the toughest things about it was that it mirrored real-life events. Brown found the episode easy to film due to the fact there were no other cast members to make mistakes, and because she "knew the character backwards" and "exactly how she'd behave and what she'd feel and [...] her history." She praised Arnold and the crew, stating that the episode was "lovely" to make and she felt "very fortunate to be given the opportunity." The performance was edited in post production after being committed to tape, where usually all scenes are vision mixed, and the usual EastEnders theme tune was replaced at the end of the episode with Tony Jackson's "Pretty Baby".

== Reception ==
=== Ratings and critical reception ===
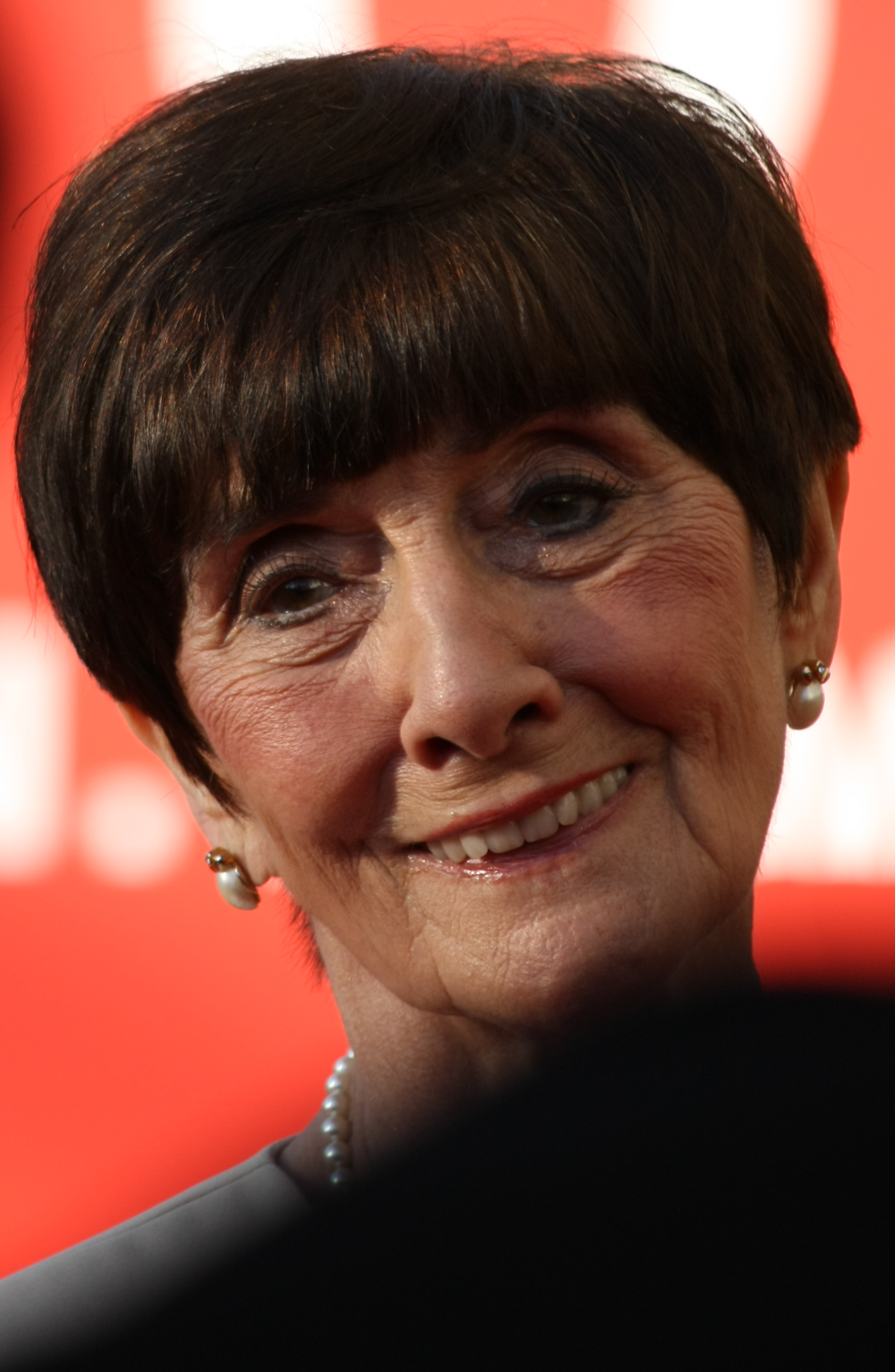
June Brown was praised for her portrayal of Dot Branning in "Pretty Baby....".

Overnight figures indicated that the episode averaged 8.7 million viewers and a 37% audience share. Official figures gave the episode ratings of 8.86 million for its original airing and 740,000 for its 10pm repeat on BBC Three. Brown's performance in the episode was praised by Robert Hanks of The Independent who wrote: "I don't ever remember hearing anybody on a soap talk like this before. I mean, like a real person, with real feelings, such as self-pity and a desperate urge for self-preservation. Brown conveyed the seedy gloom of it all beautifully, as well." Nancy Banks-Smith of The Guardian deemed Brown possibly the only member of the cast, with the exception of Barbara Windsor (Peggy Mitchell), capable of carrying such a monologue, opining that she "carried it off magnificently". She took issue with Dot's characterisation, however, believing that Dot is presented as the serial's "moral compass", and would not leave her husband in a nursing home.

Jim Shelley from the Daily Mirror praised Jordan's writing and Brown's acting, saying "tonight's episode of EastEnders is as powerful and poignant a piece of drama as you will see on TV all year". Shelley opined that "June [...] proves what the soaps can achieve when they use actors of genuine class and let them show what they are capable of" and stated "The fact that co-star John Bardon [...] is recovering from a stroke in real life adds an extra terrible pathos to the episode." Cole Moreton of The Independent wrote "The preview disc had revealed it to be a mesmerising piece of television, a kind of cor blimey Samuel Beckett, in which Brown conveyed her character's conflicting emotions beautifully." Mark Wright of The Stage praised Brown's acting as "amazing", observing that she made the episode look "effortless" and commenting: "I don't think there's another soap actress out there who could carry this." Virgin Media selected the episode as showcasing one of the best ever soap opera performances, deeming Brown's portrayal "comic and endearing" and the episode "never less than riveting."

However, reviews were not uniformly positive. Tim Teeman posed the question in The Times: "I know she's a national institution and June Brown plays her like a dream, but was last night's Dot [Branning] extravaganza really that great? Or even necessary?" Teeman opined that: "Quite rightly, the producers want to eke as much gold out of the character and actress as possible: both are fantastic. But this was much-loved character overkill." He noted that Jordan's script worked best as Dot remembered Ethel, but assessed that the episode was overly indulgent, and did not reveal anything "substantially new" about Dot. As with Banks-Smith's review, Teeman felt that the episode was incompatible with Dot's former characterisation, suggesting that her Christian faith ought to have tempered her decision not to care for Jim. He felt that overall, the episode was somewhat dull and boring, describing Dot as an EastEnders "jewel" who should be cherished, not turned into a "drag act".

The Guardian's Gareth McLean described the episode as a "bold move" on the part of the EastEnders producers in deviating from the serial's usual format, and found it to be "compelling and brave", but "not as convincing as it should be". The Daily Telegraph's Gerard O'Donovan felt that Brown gave a "mesmerising" performance, but was critical of the episode as a whole, concluding: "Overall [...] the feeling couldn't be avoided that in the greater scheme of things this was a fuss over nothing. Had it been a swan song, it would have been a worthy one. But doubtless Dot will be out and about again tonight, fag in hand, quoting from the Good Book. Enjoyable as this Albert Square indulgence was, I suspect that most fans will be hoping this one-hander remains a one-off." Leigh Holmwood for The Guardian suggested that viewers may have agreed with O'Donovan's assessment, highlighting the fact that the episode received only 8.7 million viewers, compared to 9.4 million watching EastEnders the previous week. O'Donovan compared the episode to Krapp's Last Tape, saying "it must be said there were quite a few moments of positively (or perhaps that should be negatively) Beckettian bleakness here as Dot recalled, in painfully vivid detail, how time and time again 'life took away everything I ever cared about' and 'all that I ever 'ad, I lorst'."

=== Award nomination ===
Brown was nominated in the Best Actress category at the 2009 British Academy Television Awards based on her performance in the episode, becoming the first soap actress nominated in the category since 1988, when Jean Alexander was shortlisted for her role as Hilda Ogden in Coronation Street. She commented that she was proud to be nominated, but was not overly excited as: "I don't believe anything is going to happen until it does, until you see your name on a paper or it actually happens and you have something in your hand." Brown lost out to Anna Maxwell Martin, but the show's executive producer, Diederick Santer, described the nomination as his proudest moment of 2009, saying: "I'm not one to complain to the referee, but it's beyond me why she didn't win. Week in, week out, she turns out amazing performances. The audience knew it and we knew it. With the greatest respect to the actress who won, you could hear the audience in the Royal Festival Hall that night sigh with disappointment. It was a missed opportunity by BAFTA [...] to connect with a big audience." McLean agreed that Brown deserved to win, but commented on the awards: "never underestimate snobbery towards soap." Brown spoke of the nomination in 2013, saying: "You never [win] if you're in a soap. [...] I would've liked it, yes. I would've felt it had crowned my acting in a way, made it sound worthwhile, I think. So I didn't care that I didn't get nominated for any other awards that time!"
