= Clive Arnold =

British television director

- Occupation: Television director

Clive Arnold is a British television director, known for his work on the BBC One prime time Continuing Drama EastEnders.

== Career ==
Arnold began in showbusiness as an actor, working for seven years in theatre and TV . Realising his talents may lie in working behind the camera, Clive joined the BBC as a runner, and spent 11 years working his way up to becoming a director. His first episode of EastEnders was on 23 November 2000 and he has since directed several notable episodes including Dot Branning's (June Brown) single-hander episode, the Christmas Day 2008 episodes, a live episode on 19 February 2010 celebrating the show's 25th anniversary, which won the award for Best Single Episode at the 2010 British Soap Awards, and the episode 4466, in which Billy Mitchell (Perry Fenwick) carries the Olympic Flame in a live segment of the episode, which was nominated for Spectacular Scene of the Year at the 2013 British Soap Awards. He has also directed for ITV's Emmerdale and Where the Heart Is, BBC's Holby City, and a special EastEnders spin-off, Perfectly Frank, focusing on the character Frank Butcher (Mike Reid). In 2022, Clive's episodes of Coronation Street won the BAFTA for Best Continuing Drama.

== See also ==
- List of EastEnders crew members
