= Tony Jordan =

British television writer (born 1957)

- Born: 21 July 1957 (age 69); Southport, Lancashire, England
- Occupation: Screenwriter
- Years active: 1989–present

Tony Jordan (born 21 July 1957) is a British television writer. For many years, he was lead writer and series consultant for BBC One soap opera EastEnders. He has written over 250 episodes for the programme since 1989, including the 2008 single-hander "Pretty Baby....". He created the series Hustle, HolbyBlue, City Central, Moving Wallpaper, Echo Beach, The Nativity, The Passing Bells and Dickensian, and co-created Life on Mars and By Any Means.

== Career ==
Beginning his career as a market trader, Jordan began writing at the age of thirty-two. He joined EastEnders after sending a spec script to the BBC about market traders, with a covering letter saying he had been born and raised in the East End of London. The BBC turned down the spec script, but gave him a job on EastEnders because of his apparent life experience. Afraid of what would happen if the producers found out that he was from the north, Jordan kept up the pretence of being a Londoner for five years.

Jordan left school with no qualifications. For his work on EastEnders, he is particularly known for creating the Slater family along with then-producer, John Yorke. Amongst significant episodes he scripted are those featuring the deaths of Arthur Fowler and Ethel Skinner; the "Sharongate" storyline, Kat Slater's revelation to Zoe that she was her mother, the Andy-Kat-Alfie love triangle, and Dot's monologue. He was the first writer to work on EastEnders when it began airing three times a week, when the siege at the Queen Victoria public house took place in 1994. He continued to work on EastEnders through a period which saw a reversal in its declining fortunes, with the programme winning the Most Popular Soap category at the National Television Awards in 2005. He wrote the first two episodes (broadcast on 24 and 25 October 2005) for the return of the characters of Phil and Grant Mitchell, popular characters he had originally helped to create back in 1990.

While on staff at EastEnders, Jordan undertook a number of freelance projects. In early 2004, he created hit BBC One con artist drama Hustle. He also co-created the time travel/police drama Life on Mars, which began in 2006.

Jordan's other credits include Boon (ITV), Minder (ITV), Trainer (BBC), Eldorado (BBC), Thief Takers (ITV), Where the Heart Is (ITV), City Central (BBC), The Vanishing Man (ITV), and Sunburn (BBC).

In January 2007, Jordan's departure from EastEnders was announced, as it was his plan to concentrate on running his own new production company, Red Planet Pictures, backed by leading independent producer Kudos Film & Television. HolbyBlue, a new BBC One police drama, spun off from the channel's successful medical drama Holby City debuted in May 2007, quickly being recommissioned for a second run.

Jordan also created the series of Moving Wallpaper and Echo Beach for ITV; these were companion pieces, the latter being a soap opera and the former being a sitcom about the production of that soap opera.

In 2007, Jordan was honoured for his work on EastEnders at The British Soap Awards with a "Special Achievement award". On 14 November 2007, it was announced that Jordan would be returning to EastEnders less than twelve months after quitting, to write one final episode. Jordan subsequently wrote the script for Dot Cotton's single-handed episode, broadcast on 31 January 2008 on BBC One. Ten years later John Yorke asked him to write Kat Moon's return to EastEnders in March 2018 and he wrote the second episode that aired on 22 March under a pseudonym, Harry Holmes.

In 2008, he worked on Hustle and zombie drama Renaissance, starring Kelly Brook and Alan Dale.

In 2010 Jordan wrote The Nativity, a new BBC version of the nativity of Jesus story starring Peter Capaldi, broadcast in December 2010. Jordan states he had always had a faith but it was during this work that he became convinced that Jesus who was born in this way is the Son of God and that the Nativity story is a 'true story' and a 'thing of beauty'.

In 2013 Jordan wrote By Any Means and The Passing-Bells, and in 2015 he wrote Dickensian. In 2016, he co-created the adventure series Hooten & the Lady. Most recently, Jordan co-created Beyond Paradise, a spin-off of the long-running crime series Death in Paradise.
