= List of Noah's Arc characters =

Noah's Arc, a comedy-drama series, follows the lives of four friends who work to solve their dilemmas involving sexuality, gay bashing, same-sex parenting, and HIV/AIDS awareness, as well as finding acceptance and equality in their community. Since its debut in October 2005, the series has followed the career of Noah Nicholson, as he progresses through different jobs to mainstream screenwriter.

Series director Patrik-Ian Polk previously explored similar themes in his 2000 film Punks, which shared cast members Rodney Chester, Gregory Kieth, and Rockmond Dunbar.

== Main characters ==
=== Noah Nicholson-Robinson ===
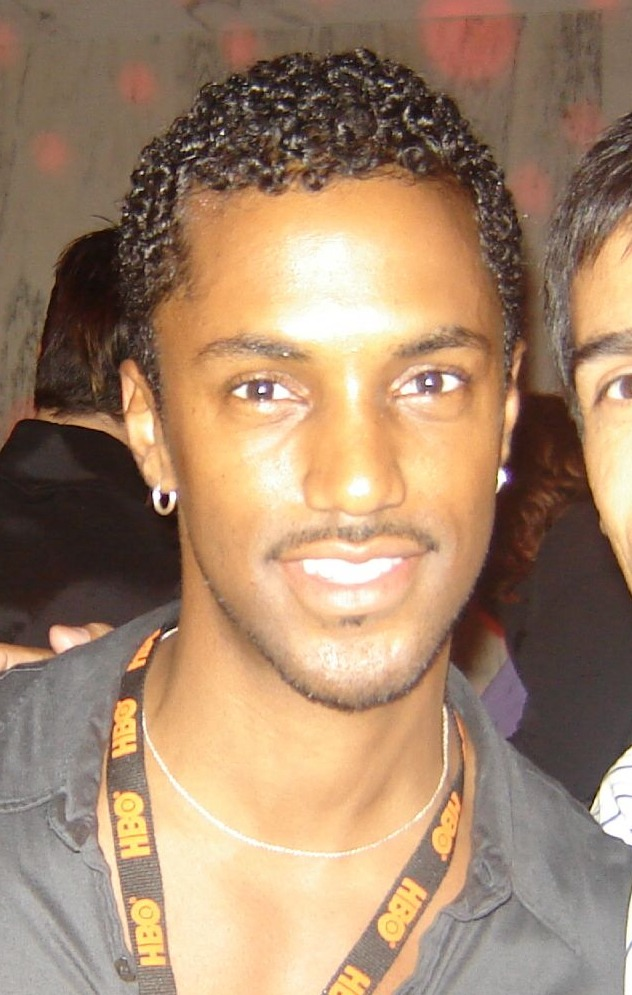
Noah Nicholson was portrayed by Darryl Stephens.

- Portrayed by Darryl Stephens
- Episodes: "My One Temptation" – present

Noah is the protagonist of the series. He is an aspiring screenwriter, who was later hired by Brandy King of Paramount Studios to do a re-write of Wade's scripts "Bait and Switch". He is best friends with Alex, Chance, and Ricky. In the first episode of season 1, it is revealed that he often meets up with Wade at a cafe to collaborate on script and movie ideas. Noah begins an intimate relationship with Wade in the second episode of season 1, which continued until Wade broke up with Noah after catching him kissing Malik at the end of season 1. Throughout the series, Noah helps Wade comes to terms with his sexuality.

In the first episode of season 2, Noah is revealed to have been in relationship with Malik for several months. After a brief encounter with Wade and his new boyfriend, Noah breaks up with Malik after realizing that he hasn't gotten over Wade. Throughout season 2, Noah has relationships with Baby Gat and Quincy, the latter which ended at last episode of season 2. Noah also regains the trust of Wade and they collaborate on a new script called "Fine Art". At the end of the sixth episode in season 2, Noah is gay bashed by three guys at a gas station. In the following episode, Wade is shown to be first one present at the hospital to be beside Noah. Noah is later released to his home and Wade is shown taking revenge on one of the guys who attacked Noah. Wade is later shown helping to take care of Noah. During this time, Wade revealed that he was still in love with Noah, despite being in a relationship with Dre. The following day, Noah and his friends attend a party at a public beach, which Wade and Dre also attend. Noah and Wade later shown kissing bathroom while a heartbroken Dre watches. When Dre and Wade leave the beach, it is revealed that they got into a car accident with Wade being thrown from the vehicle. Noah and his friends later arrive at the accident scene when they realized that it was Wade's vehicle that was overturn. Noah is then shown holding Wade in his arms while awaiting for an ambulance.

In Jumping the Broom, Noah and Wade have fully rekindled their relationship and later get married at Martha's Vineyard. Noah also accidentally reveals to Wade's mother that he is gay after inviting her to their wedding. During the same night, a heartbroken Noah is shown watching a slightly-intoxicated Wade and Ricky share a kiss. When Wade realizes this, he chases after Noah who eventually locks himself in their room and begins to doubt if he should marry Wade or not. After a heartfelt conversation with Brandy in the following morning, Noah forgives Wade and continue with their wedding plans.

=== Alex Kirby-Iverson ===
- Portrayed by Rodney Chester
- Episodes: "My One Temptation" – present

Alex is an outspoken HIV counselor who demonstrates self-confidence, sassy-mouthed, and a "take charge" personality. He's also in a relationship with Trey. During season 1, Alex works as a counselor at the HIV Treatment and Prevention Center until quitting the job in episode 5. He later opens his own non-profit HIV-awareness treatment center called "Black Aids Institute". Throughout most of the series, Alex was on-going war with Guy who was secretly trying to steal Trey from him. At the end of season 1, Alex proposes to Trey who declines after he reveals that he took a position in Africa to work with AIDs patients and orphans.

In the beginning of season 2, Trey returns home and offers Guy a place to stay at Trey and Alex's home. Alex reluctantly allows Guy to stay with them to prove he is not insecure about having Guy in their home. Various schemes by Guy are shown to put a strain on Alex and Trey. In the sixth episode of season 2, Alex (with help from Noah, Ricky, and Chance) is able to reveal to Trey that Guy was trying to break up them up. In the season 2 finale, Alex and Trey talk about adopting a child after babysitting Kenya.

In Jumping the Broom, it is revealed that Alex and Trey adopted a new-born boy named Ojemodupe ("OJ" for short). It is also revealed that Trey and Alex have been in a long-term relationship for 11 years.

=== Ricky Davis ===
- Portrayed by Christian Vincent
- Episodes: "My One Temptation" – present

Ricky is the owner of a men's clothing store called Trade Analysis on Melrose Avenue. Described as a free-spirit and "saying yes to life" personality, Rick is sexually promiscuous who avoids commitment. It is revealed in season 1 that the total of men Ricky has had sex is "triple digits", hinting that he has had sex with over 100 guys. Ricky's promiscuity has often caused his store to suffer as one guy stole a shirt from his store while Ricky was having sex with a guy in another room of the store. He ultimately hires Raphael as a sales-clerk associate to help manage his store. In mid-season 1, Ricky begins a one-sided open relationship with Junito. During the relationship, Ricky struggles to comes to term that he is in a sexual relationship with Junito, who is HIV-positive. The revelation causes Junito to end their relationship after Ricky feels uncomfortable.

In season 2, Ricky and Junito consummate their now mutual open-relationship. At the end of season 2, Ricky breaks up with Junito after he sets him up with a guy who Junito becomes close with. Ricky cites the reason behind the breakup was that he "can't breathe" and "felt like he was in prison".

In Jumping the Broom, Ricky confesses that he has been in love with Noah for a very long time. This was hinted many times in the series. The first time was when Wade struggled to identify himself as Noah's boyfriend in the third episode of season 1. The second time was when Noah was gay bashed in sixth episode of season 2. In the following episode, Ricky confessed to Noah that he loved him but he did not clarify the extent of his feelings.

=== Chance Counter-McIntyre ===
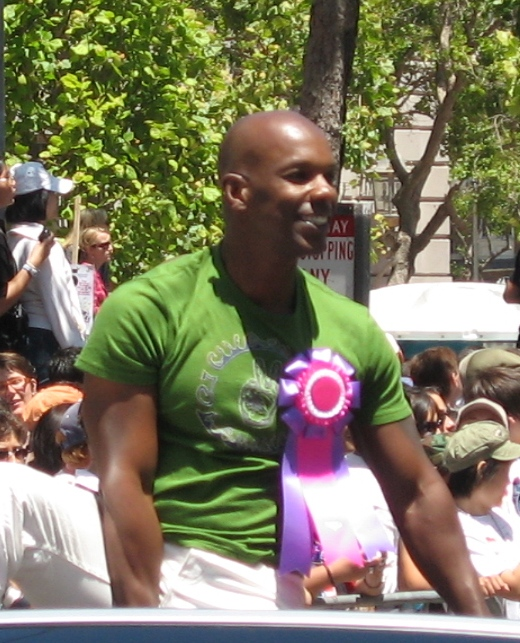
Chance Counter was portrayed by Doug Spearman.

- Portrayed by Doug Spearman
- Episodes: "My One Temptation" – present

Chance is an economics professor at a college. It is revealed during a flashback in the second episode that Noah was a student of his and that this is how they met. He is described as the voice of reason in the group. Chance is Eddie's partner. He also helps take care of Eddie's young daughter Kenya. In the pilot episode, Chance is shown giving up his apartment and moving in with Eddie. In the third episode of season 1, Eddie is shown having cheated on Chance with another guy from an online website while Chance alongside Noah, Alex, Ricky, Trey, and Wade watch through a window of the guy's home. This causes Chance to break up with Eddie and move in with his friend Noah. Despite their breakup, Chance still keeps his obligations to Kenya including picking her up from school and ballet. After his breakup with Eddie, Chance begins dating T-Money, a street gangster, to explore why Eddie cheated with a guy of similar nature. For a brief period, Chance abandons his professional attire to act and dress more like a thug. T-Money also gives Chance the nickname "Lil' C". Chance later reconciles with Eddie after Eddie proposes to him. In a deleted scene, Chance revealed to Eddie that he never had sex with T-Money. At the end of season 1, Chance and Eddie got married.

In season 2, Chance helps his friends through their dilemma. In the fifth episode of season 2, Chance and Eddie allow Eddie's boss's wife stay at their home after she revealed to her husband that she was a lesbian. Eddie's boss ultimately fires Eddie. Chance later meets up with Eddie's boss to beg for Eddie's job back, which is successful after Eddie's boss confided in Chance.

In Jumping the Broom, Chance and Eddie began having marriage problems when one of Chance's students Brandon (who is also Ricky's current love-interest) accompanies them to Martha's Vineyard. Brandon reveals that he has a crush on Chance and ultimately has sex with him. Chance later reveals this to Eddie and work together to move past their issues.

=== Wade Robinson ===
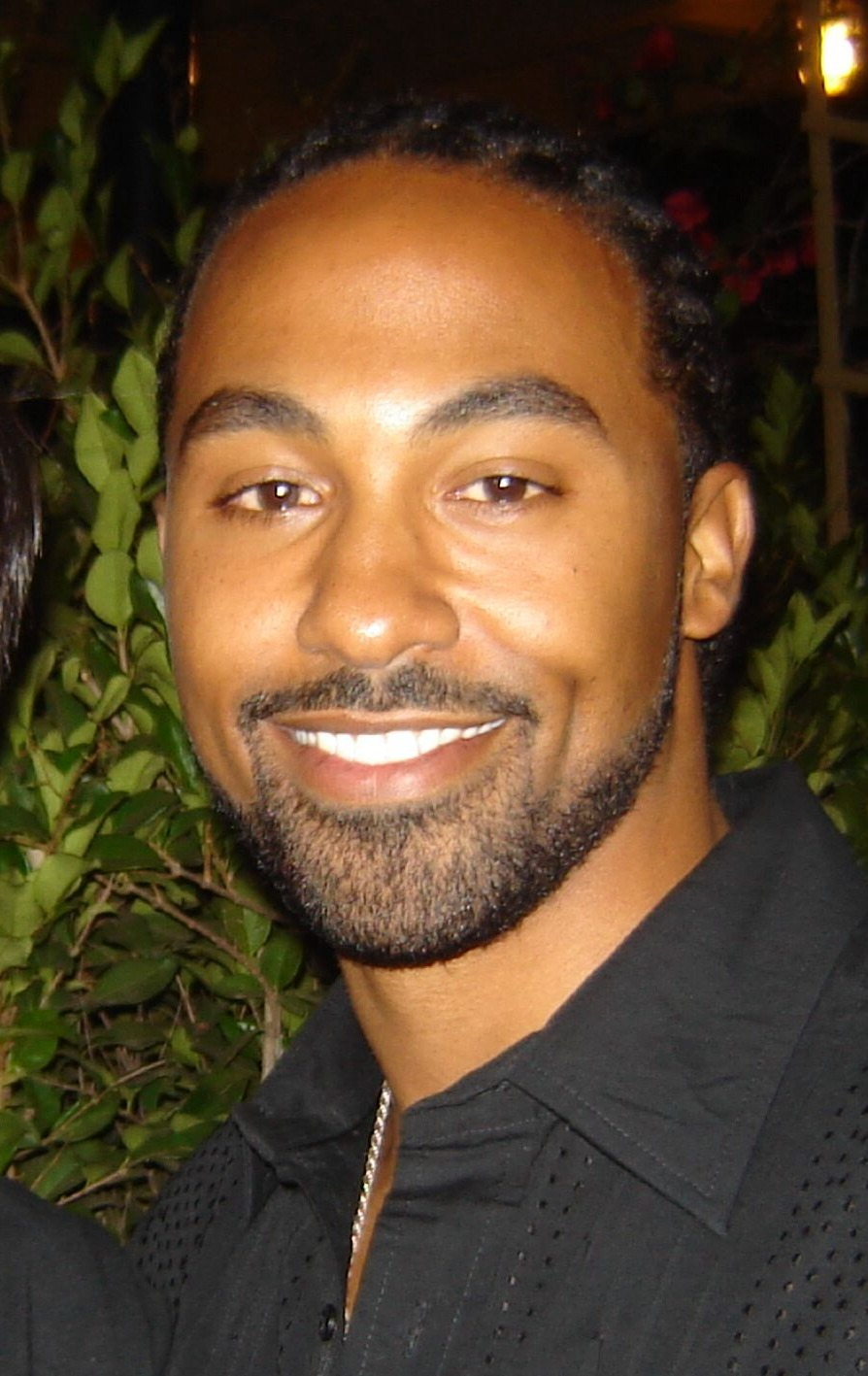
Wade Robinson was portrayed by Jensen Atwood.

- Portrayed by Jensen Atwood
- Episodes: "My One Temptation" – present

Wade is a former screenwriter. During season 1, Wade develops a bi-curious personality toward Noah. Following a threesome at his apartment with Brandy and Noah, Wade enters into his first homosexual relationship with Noah. Wade struggles with his sexual identity and at one point couldn't reveal to a real estate agent that he and Noah were in a relationship during their search for new home together. At the end of season 1, Wade walks in on Noah kissing Malik and ultimately ends his relationship with Noah.

In season 2, it is revealed that Wade changed his phone number and address. In the first episode of season 2, Wade is shown having a new boyfriend, Dre, a barista at a club. In the following episode, Wade is shown having a new job at a furniture store to which he unknowingly delivered a refrigerator to Noah's new home. During this time, Noah tries to apologize to Wade for cheating on him to which Wade does not accept. Wade also revealed that he never cashed his royalty checks to his screen-write collaboration with Noah. Wade ultimately forgives Noah after Dre invites Noah to their apartment for dinner. Wade is shown to be on speaking terms with Noah throughout the second season. When Noah was gay-bashed and later hospitalized, Wade was the first one to appear at the hospital, where he told the nurse that he was Noah's boyfriend so that he would be allowed to see Noah. He later takes revenge on one of the guys who attacked Noah and was later jailed because of it. Noah showed up at the jail to post bail for Wade and Dre later shows up to do the same thing. After Dre offers to drive Wade home, Wade refuses and takes a still-injured Noah back home. During this time, Wade and Noah become intimate although they are both in relationships with different men. Wade also confesses that he still loves Noah very much. In the end of season 2, Wade and Noah are shown kissing in a public beach bathroom when Dre walks in on them. Wade leaves to chase after a heartbroken Dre. They are later shown leaving together in Dre's car. At the end of the episode, Wade and Dre are involved in a car accident to which Noah and his arrive to. An unconscious Wade is shown laying Noah's arms.

In Jumping the Broom, Wade has fully recovered from the car accident. It was revealed that Noah "nursed him back to health". Wade also proposed to Noah and decided to get married at Wade's family vacation home in Martha's Vineyard. During a night at the place, a slightly-drunk Wade and Ricky are shown confiding in each other and eventually share a kiss. Noah is shown watching through a window when Wade realizes this and eventually chases after a heartbroken Noah. Wade and Noah later makeup the following morning and continue with their wedding plans. When Wade's mother arrives at the wedding, Wade reveals to her that he is gay and will marry Noah despite her approval or disapproval to which she accepts him as a gay man.

== Recurring characters ==
=== Trey Iverson ===
- Portrayed by Gregory Kieth
- Episodes: "My One Temptation" – present

Trey is Alex's long-term partner. He is an anesthesiologist and muscle-bound firefighter. He is completely devoted to Alex as well new sexual techniques that keeps their relationship interesting. Throughout season 1, Trey is often shown helping Alex with his many tasks including setting up his own HIV-awareness clinic and moving heavy boxes. Alex eventually befriends a "straight" man named Guy, who secretly becomes interested in Trey. When Alex becomes protective of Trey, Trey expresses his disapproval and deems Alex as a jealous and crazy. At the end of season 1, Alex proposed to Trey during Chance and Eddie's wedding ceremony. Trey declined his proposal and told Alex that he accepted a relief mission to Africa to help HIV patients and infants and that he will be accompanied by Guy.

In season 2, Trey returned from Africa. He is accompanied by Guy who needed a place to stay and offered to let Guy stay with him and Alex. It is noted throughout season 2 that Trey is completely oblivious to the fact that Guy is in love with him and does anything to ruin any romantic plans he has with Alex. After Guy is tricked into thinking Trey left him a love note, Trey arrives home to which Guy surprisingly kisses him. After Trey pushes away Guy, Trey finally realized that Alex was right all along and that Guy has been trying to break them up. Trey and Alex kick Guy out of their home and later apologizes to Alex.

In Jumping the Broom, Trey is shown with his and Alex's adoptive newborn baby Ojemodupe. Trey only appears through video chats he has with Alex. It is revealed that Trey could not travel with Alex and his friends to Martha's Vineyard because he had to stay with Ojemodupe. Alex and Trey were unsure if Ojemodupe was HIV positive or negative and did not want risk the health of his immune system if he was HIV-positive. Alex revealed that Ojemodupe was born to a HIV-positive mother.

=== Eddie McIntyre ===
- Portrayed by Jonathan Julian
- Episodes: "My One Temptation" – present

Eddie is Chance's partner and the biological father of Kenya. In the pilot episode, Chance is shown moving into Eddie's home. In the third episode of season 1, he is shown having sex with another man while Chance and his friends watch through a window. After numerous attempts to reconcile with Chance, Eddie eventually proposed to Chance, which he accepts. At the end of season 1, he and Chance got married. During their wedding ceremony, a physical fight erupted between Wade and Malik concerning Noah. When Wade attempts to punch Malik, he missed and accidentally hits Eddie leaving him unconscious with a concussion.

In season 2, Eddie is shown alongside Chance in happy marriage. Eddie later invites his bosses over for dinner at his home, to which it is later revealed to Chance that his bosses' wives are secrets lesbians in a relationship. After Chance encourages one of the ladies (Vonda) to come out of the closet, Eddie's boss fires him. A scene is shown where his boss confides in Chance, who successful asked for Eddie's job back.

In Jumping the Broom, Eddie and Chance's marriage appears to be rocky. Eddie is shown having some jealously toward Brandon, a student of Chance who interested in Chance and the current love interest of Ricky. A scene shows Eddie talking to Chance about their dreams. After Chance states that Eddie is going through a "mid-life crisis", he slaps Chance. Chance and Eddie are later shown to have reconciled.

=== Kenya McIntyre ===
- Portrayed by Jurnee Crapps in Season One, Sahara Davis in Season Two
- Episodes: "My One Temptation" – present

Kenya is Eddie's four-year-old daughter, and Chance's step-daughter. She is shown a quiet and innocent child throughout season 1. It is revealed that she takes ballet lessons. In the eighth episode of season 1, she shown in church alongside Eddie and Chance who want her to have a strong spiritual upbringing.

In season 2, she has shown having a more mischievous behavior. She accompanies Noah and Chance to the furniture store. When Chance was talking to Noah who was there to apologize to Wade, she ran off throughout the store. She was later found asleep on a bed in the store. In the fourth episode of season 2, she also shown giving Chance a hard time preparing her for school. She also shown being slightly manipulative of her father Eddie after Chance grounds her. After Eddie reveals that he wants to take her to the Ice Capades, she reveals to Eddie that Chance grounded to which Eddie un-grounds her. In the same episode, she gets into a fight with a boy at a school who makes fun of her for having two fathers. She later explains this to Chance who tearfully states that although he disapproves of fighting, he will not to ground her for fighting. Despite not being Chance's biological daughter, she refers to him as Daddy Chance.

A running gag in the series is Alex's habit of mispronouncing her name by calling her names such as Keisha, Kiya, and Egypt much to Chance's annoyance.

=== Junito Vargas ===
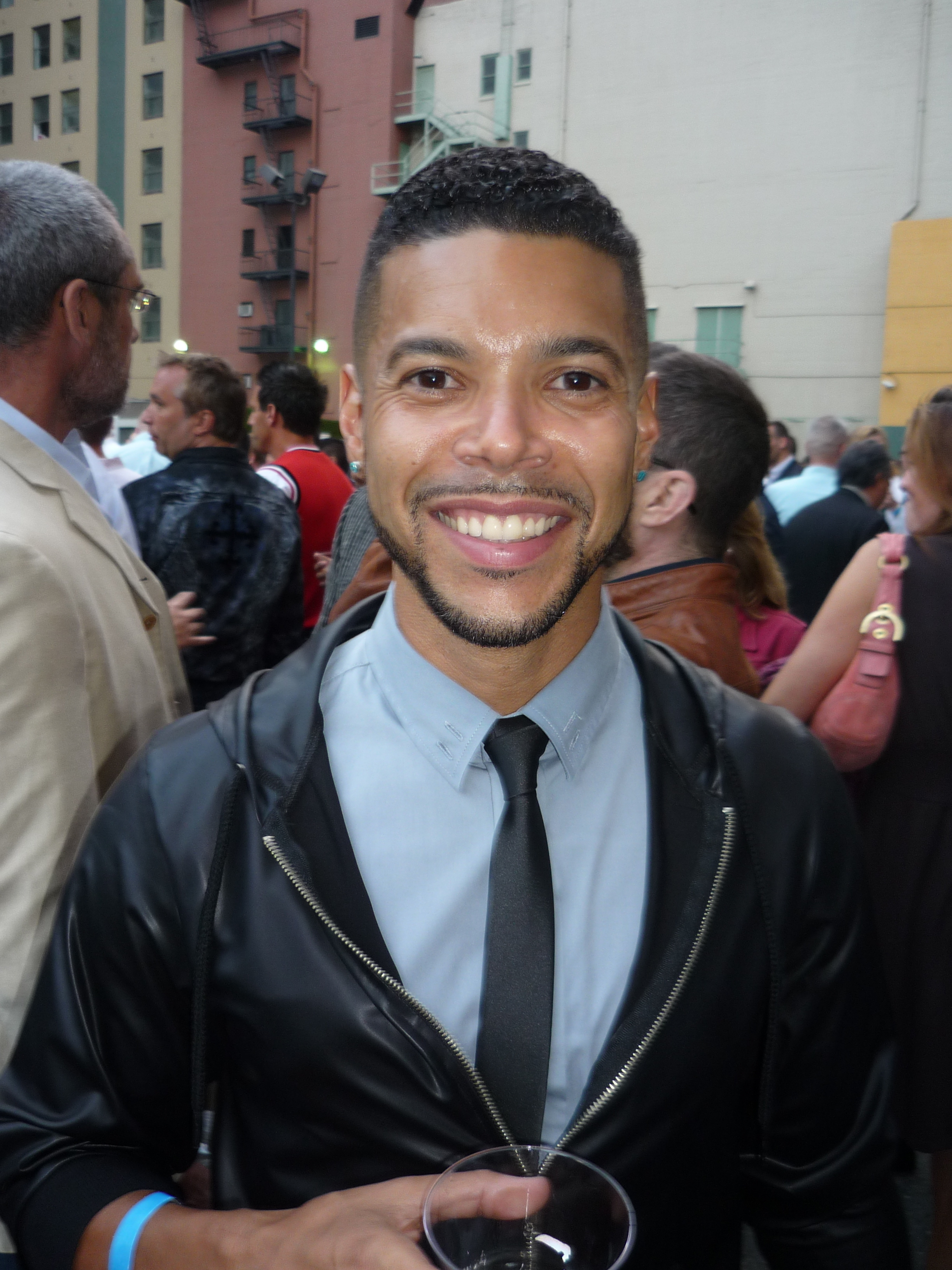
Junito Vargas was portrayed by Wilson Cruz.

- Portrayed by Wilson Cruz
- Episodes: "Writing to Reach You" – present

Junito Vargas is a doctor at Alex's Black AIDS Institute, a HIV-awareness clinic, as well as a doctor at a local hospital. Alex hires Junito as doctor for his HIV-awareness clinic. When Junito appears, he becomes the interest of Ricky who agrees to help Alex with his clinic. Ricky and Junito are later shown talking at Ricky's store. During their conversation, Junito expresses his interest in Ricky and refers to him as "refreshing". Ricky later confesses to Junito that he doesn't think he is the innocent guy that Junito has the expression of. Much to Junito's delight, Junito and Ricky kiss. When Ricky appears at Guy's home to bring Alex a change of clothes, he states that he is in love with Junito before fainting. When Ricky is hospitalized, Junito is shown as his doctor, who states that Ricky fainted due to a staph infection and also wants to run additional tests. Ricky also states that he is unaware of HIV status and believes that he may be HIV-positive after confessing to Junito that he had sex with over 100 men. Ricky then feels that is unlikely that Junito will still be interested in him for those reasons. Junito states that it is okay to him. A confused Ricky asks "Are you sure?" This prompts Junito to say "No. I am positive.", which revealed to Ricky that Junito is HIV-positive. It is later revealed that Junito has been HIV-positive for six years and found out about his status after contracting the flu. After Ricky tested negative for HIV, he enters into a brief interpersonal relationship with Junito. After Junito walks in on Ricky having sex with another guy, he decides to end his relationship with Ricky.

In season 2, Junito is still volunteering his services as a doctor for the Black Aids Institute. A surprised Ricky is shown when Junito comes into the lobby to help the next patient. After talking with a HIV-positive patient, Ricky comes to realization that he wants to be in a relationship with Junito. At the end of the second episode for season 2, Junito decides to enter in an honest, open relationship with Ricky. At the end of season 2, Ricky introduced Junito to a guy named Travis in hopes that Junito would have sex with him. Ricky later returns to find Junito simply talking with Travis. After seeing how comfortable Junito was with Travis, Ricky decides to break up with Junito and cites the reason as he "can't breathe" and "felt like he was in prison".

=== Brandy King ===
- Portrayed by Jennia Fredrique
- Episodes: "My One Temptation" – present

Brandy is the boss of Noah, and formerly Wade, who assigns him in screenwriting projects. She works at Paramount Studios as a producer. She first appeared when Wade hosted a threesome with her and a surprised Noah. After the hook-up, she shows an interest in Noah after hearing that he is a screenwriter. After reading some of Noah's work, she gives him the task of rewriting "Bait & Switch" later titled "Fine Art", a script originally written by Wade. When Noah later asks to collaborate with Wade, she is reluctant to agree as she states Wade is "not hot right now". She ultimately agrees and when the script was completed, she pitched the idea to another producer. They both agreed the script was great after Wade and Noah changed one of the heterosexual characters to a homosexual character.

In season 2, Brandy calls Noah to a meeting with Rockmond Dunbar to discuss being cast in Fine Art. During the meeting, Rockmond believes the characters should be heterosexual much to Brandy and Noah's surprise. When Rockmond later backs out of the script, Brandy replaces him with Baby Gat, a British rapper. She brings Noah and Baby Gat together to spend time together and discuss the details of Fine Art. After an accidental press release about the movie, Brandy calls Noah to her office concerning the press leak. It is noted that she is unaware that Noah accidentally leaked the details of the movie to his then-boyfriend Quincy Abraham who booked Noah on a talk show to discuss it. Feeling that her office could be seen as homophobic for wanting to change script back to heterosexual characters, Brandy advises Noah what to say when he tells her that he will be on a talk show to discuss the movie. Noah ultimately intends to answer truthfully about script much to Brandy's dismay until Baby Gat makes an unexpected trip to set.

In Jumping the Broom, Brandy drops off Baby Gat at Wade's vacation home in Martha's Vineyard. When Noah calls her to pick up Baby Gat, she refuses and says that she is going to a party hosted by Diddy. She reappears slightly intoxicated at Wade's home along with Baby Gat. Her and Alex become close friends after talking that night. The next morning, she wakes up only to see Noah depressed and having second thoughts about marrying Wade after he saw Wade kiss Ricky. She gives Noah some heartfelt advice, which ultimately reassures him to marry Wade.

== Other characters ==
- Guy (Benjamin Patterson) used to be close friends with Trey and Wade. He was a straight-oriented man, but it was later discovered that he had secret affections for Trey.
- Romeo (Dwen Curry) is a gender non-conforming fashion designer who sells their clothes at Ricky's store.
- Raphael (Jeremy Batiste) is an employee that works in Ricky's store. Ricky himself once had affections for Raphael, but later discovered that Raphael has affections for Romeo. He was hired in the third episode of Season One. He was not seen in Season Two until the series finale.
- T-Money (Catero Colbert) is a street gangster. He helped Chance to be more street-oriented. They also had a brief relationship together during Eddie's aftermath of infidelity. He only appeared in Season One.
- Dre (Merwin Mondesir) was a barista at a gay club and Wade's second boyfriend until Wade and Noah have gotten back together. He was introduced to the series in Season Two. Dre and Wade were involved in a serious car accident after Dre saw Wade and Noah having an affair.
- Quincy Abraham (Keith Hamilton Cobb) is one of Dre's long-time high school friends. Quincy was introduced to Noah by Dre, and he and Noah began dating. He was introduced to the series in Season Two.
- Baby Gat (Jason Steed) is a big-time English rapper who is starring in Noah's feature film Fine Art. Baby Gat, whose real name is Curtis, presents himself as a straight man to his fans, but is attracted to Noah.

== Characters from the film ==
- Brandon (Gary LeRoi Gray) is a college student who attended one of Chance's courses at the university. He traveled as Ricky's companion to Martha's Vineyard for Noah and Wade's wedding. However, he has a crush on Chance, which causes problems with Eddie.
- Mrs. Nicholson (Suzanne Coy) is the mother of Noah. Although she never physically appeared in the series, she was mentioned by Noah. She appears for the first time in Jumping the Broom. She arrives right before Noah and Wade's wedding ceremony. She is shown being extremely comfortable and supportive with Noah's sexuality and his wedding with Wade. She mentions that her husband (Noah's father) wanted to be there, could not attend because his mother (Noah's grandmother) had an unexpected, but not serious fall. She also mentioned that they will throw a huge reception for Noah and Wade in L.A. She is later seen dancing with Mrs. Robinson (Wade's mother) at the wedding reception.
- Patricia Robinson (Tonya Pinkins) is Wade's mother. It was mentioned in the pilot episode that she used to sing in her church choir. She named Wade after her favorite song "Wade in the Water". Although she does not physically appear in the series, she appeared in Jumping the Broom. During a night of drinking, Noah calls her in the middle of the night to invite her to their wedding. In disbelief, she believes Noah is telling lies and hangs up on him. She later arrives at the wedding ceremony before it begins where Wade introduces her to Noah. Wade also tells her that he is gay and will marry Noah even if she were to disapprove of it. She reassures him that she still loves him and that she supports his decision. Despite approving of their wedding, she has not gotten used to Noah yet. During the wedding reception, she is shown dancing with Noah's mother.
