= List of Noah's Arc episodes =

Noah's Arc is an American cable television comedy-drama created, written and directed by Patrik-Ian Polk. The series, which predominantly features gay black and Latino characters and revolves around the lives of four black gay friends living in Los Angeles, California.

== Series overview ==
Season	Episodes	Originally released	
Season	Episodes	First released	Last released
1	9	October 19, 2005	December 7, 2005
2	8	August 6, 2006	October 4, 2006
Noah's Arc: Jumping the Broom		October 24, 2008	
Noah's Arc: The 'Rona Chronicles		July 29, 2020	
Noah's Arc: The Movie		June 20, 2025	

== Episodes ==
=== Season 1 (2005) ===
No. overall	No. in season	Title	Original release date
1	1	"My One Temptation, Part 1"	October 19, 2005
Noah introduces his best friends Alex, Ricky and Chance to his new friend Wade, an obviously straight screenwriter. The guys note Noah's attraction to Wade and warn him against getting involved, but is there a chance Wade might be gay? Meanwhile, Ricky struggles to resist the advances of his hot new store clerk; Alex discovers his boyfriend Trey's extracurricular internet activity; and Chance feels the pressures of moving in with his new man and baby stepdaughter.
2	2	"My One Temptation, Part 2"	October 19, 2005
The mystery around Wade's sexuality deepens after a provocative night out with Noah. Meanwhile Alex finds a clever solution to Trey's cyber sex addiction; Ricky continues his raucous sexcapades; and Chance cheats on his and Eddie's house- with his old apartment.
3	3	"Don't Mess with My Man"	October 26, 2005
After weeks of neglecting his friends in favor of his new man, Noah tries to bring the two sides together at Sunday brunch. But Wade's ignorance of all things gay shines through, as does his jealousy over Noah and Ricky's physical closeness. Meanwhile, Alex deals with Trey's weird new sexual proclivities; Ricky is thrown for a loop when his cute new store clerk Raphael doesn't seem to fancy him; and Chance suspects Eddie of cheating.
4	4	"Don't Make Me Over"	November 2, 2005
Noah insists upon meeting Wade's straight friends, but feels uncomfortable when he discovers that Wade hasn't come out to them. Frustrated by Wade's subtle attempts to get him to "butch it up", Noah struggles to stand his ground and be true to his identity. Meanwhile, Alex shocks all by signing up for an amateur drag competition; Ricky tries to prove to his friends that he does date; and Chance is consoled over his recent relationship troubles.
5	5	"Nothin' Goin' On but the Rent"	November 9, 2005
Noah's status as a starving artist takes a turn for the worse when he gets way behind on his rent and has to sell his beloved classic car after refusing financial help from Wade. Continuing his evolution into the perfect boyfriend, Wade decides to throw him a surprise birthday party to cheer him up. But fate complicates matters when Noah gets his first studio writing job! Meanwhile, Chance goes to extreme measures to try and save his relationship; Alex makes a major career change; and Ricky's irresponsible behavior spirals out of control.
6	6	"Writing to Reach You"	November 16, 2005
When Wade's career takes a downward spiral, Noah suggests they collaborate on a project, to disastrously tense results. At the same time, Alex monopolizes everyone's time helping to set up his new business, while trying to deal with his own jealousy over Trey's burgeoning friendship with a seemingly straight colleague. Also, Chance's new relationship with the thuggish T-Money is not all it seems; and Ricky gets more than he bargained for when he takes an interest in a cute Latino doctor helping out at Alex's clinic.
7	7	"Love Is a Battlefield"	November 23, 2005
After the success of his first studio writing gig, Noah schemes to find a way to restore Wade's professional manhood. Meanwhile, the gang rallies around Ricky as he faces a personal crisis; Alex tries to win back Trey; and Chance makes a big decision about his failed relationship with Eddie.
8	8	"I'm with Stupid"	November 30, 2005
Wade temporarily moves in with Noah, causing much more tension than Noah expected. Meanwhile, Chance's special request to his boyhood church is met with a less than enthusiastic response; Alex ignores signs that his relationship with Trey is less than repaired; and Ricky smarts over the state of his affair with the handsome doctor, Junito.
9	9	"Got Til It's Gone"	December 7, 2005
As tensions mount between Noah and Wade, a handsome stranger threatens to rip them apart. Meanwhile, Chance and Eddie take a big step; Alex misreads the signs about his relationship; and Ricky tries desperately to forget about Junito. Wade finally expresses his love for Noah.

=== Season 2 (2006) ===
No. overall	No. in season	Title	Original release date
10	1	"Housequake"	August 9, 2006
Noah and the gang experience more than just a physical shake-up! A traveler returns with some interesting 'baggage'. An earthquake forces Noah to relocate with Malik, Noah runs into Wade and realizes that he is not over him.
11	2	"It Ain't Over 'Til It's Over"	August 16, 2006
A shopping trip for new house furnishings goes awry when a family member disappears and blasts from the past threaten to reignite old flames. Ricky surprises himself, and a certain someone, with a revelation.
12	3	"Desperado"	August 23, 2006
What do you get when you mix a double-date with your ex, two scandalous encounters with hired help, a third wheel house guest and two desperate housewives? A recipe for disaster.
13	4	"Excuses for Bad Behavior"	August 30, 2006
Let the party begin! Noah's day is turned topsy-turvy when a British hip-hop star crash lands in town. His idea of a good time stirs up plenty of trouble, but leads to a budding reconnection...and a revelation! Ricky finds himself committing deeper into his relationship with Junito.
14	5	"Give It Up"	September 6, 2006
Ricky's love life gets complicated, Noah's new 'friend' turns up the heat, a desperate housewife struggles to find what she truly wants, a birthday boy gets offered more than slice of cake, and someone needs a straight jacket.
15	6	"Under Pressure"	September 13, 2006
Someone is fired, someone is fired up, and someone puts out a fire. Noah is invited on a popular talk show when a certain hot topic gets controversial, but he's got a few things to work out first
16	7	"Baby Can I Hold You"	September 27, 2006
It's a dark day in the life of our guys as one of the friends experiences homophobia in the worst possible way. Tempers and emotions flare as the guys rush to Noah's side. Quincy initiates a new crusade, Alex learns to defend himself, Chance steps up to the plate for Eddie and Ricky becomes Noah's caregiver and realizes the meaning of mortality. Dre opens his eyes as Wade takes matters into his own hands and finds himself at square one.
17	8	"Say It Loud"	October 4, 2006
If you thought the wedding at the end of Season 1 was a killer closer, wait until you see how this one ends! July 4th weekend in Los Angeles can only mean one thing, Black Gay Pride! There's no better way to end Season 2 than for Noah and the gang get themselves, and their outfits, together for a charity fashion show and the annual beach party. Noah realizes where his heart lies and Wade and Dre find themselves at a critical crossroad.

== Films ==
Title	Directed by	Written by	Release date (U.S.)
Noah's Arc: Jumping the Broom	Patrik-Ian Polk	Patrik-Ian Polk, John R. Gordon	October 24, 2008
Noah Nicholson (Darryl Stephens) and his friends retreat to Martha's Vineyard for Noah's intimate marriage to Wade Robinson (Jensen Atwood).
Noah's Arc: The 'Rona Chronicles	Patrik-Ian Polk	Patrik-Ian Polk	July 29, 2020
Set during the COVID-19 pandemic, the special sees the main characters navigating a changed world while dealing with the personal challenges of the time. The special also serves as a fundraiser for various LGBTQ+ organizations.
Noah's Arc: The Movie	Patrik-Ian Polk	Teleplay by: Patrik-Ian Polk, Story by: Patrik Ian-Pol, John R. Gordon, Rikki Beadle Blai	June 20, 2025
Noah and Wade are now expecting twins, but when both are offered dream jobs, they must navigate a new reality—one of them stepping into a stay-at-home parental role.
