= Don't Make Me Over =

Don't Make Me Over may refer to:

- "Don't Make Me Over" (song), a 1962 song by Burt Bacharach and Hal David, first recorded by Dionne Warwick
- "Don't Make Me Over" (Family Guy), a 2005 television episode
- "Don't Make Me Over" (Noah's Arc), a 2005 television episode
- "Don't Make Me Over" (Roseanne), a 1992 television episode
