= The Skinny (film) =

- Directed by: Patrik-Ian Polk
- Written by: Patrik-Ian Polk
- Starring: Jussie Smollett; Anthony Burrell; Blake Young-Fountain; Jeffrey Bowyer-Chapman; Shanika Warren-Markland
- Release date: April 6, 2012
- Country: United States
- Language: English

The Skinny is a 2012 American romantic comedy-drama film directed by Patrik-Ian Polk, the creator of the Logo television series, Noah's Arc. It was released on April 6, 2012, in select theaters.

== Plot ==
The film tells the story of five friends who are Brown University classmates—four gay men and one lesbian—as they reunite in New York City for a tumultuous Gay Pride weekend. Magnus (Jussie Smollett), an affluent young medical student, is happily in a five-month relationship with his boyfriend, Ryan (Dustin Ross). Magnus's Brown University college friends join him in New York City for Gay Pride for the weekend: lesbian Yale University PhD student and gay-porn aficionado Langston (Shanika Warren-Markland); innocent and sometimes childlike Sebastian (Blake Young-Fountain), who has just come back from a year in Paris paid for by his parents' trust fund; promiscuous Kyle (Anthony Burrell), now living in Los Angeles and enjoying a career in film production; and witty and sarcastic Joey (Jeffrey Bowyer-Chapman).

== Cast ==
- Jussie Smollett as Magnus
- Blake Young-Fountain as Sebastian
- Shanika Warren-Markland as Langston
- Jeffrey Bowyer-Chapman as Joey
- Anthony Burrell as Kyle
- Jennia Fredrique as Savannah
- Dustin Ross as Ryan
- Robb Sherman as Junot
- B. Scott as Candy
- Darryl Stephens as Nurse
- Seth Gilliam as HIV testing worker
- Wilson Cruz as Dr. Velasquez
- Derrick L. Briggs as Rapist #1
- Dewayne Queen as Rapist #2
- Zeric Armenteros
- Bassey Ikpi as herself
- Phat Daddy
- Hot Rod

== Release ==
The film screened at several festivals and has a limited theatrical run before premiered on Logo on July 8, 2012.

== Reception ==
The film received mixed reviews from critics upon release. Variety reviewed the film; critic Dennis Harvey dubbed the film a "likable seriocomic ensembler". Further, Harvey wrote: "Performers, including several prior Polk players, make for pleasant company. Production values are decent on a budget, though the Manhattan setting isn’t used to maximum advantage." The Hollywood Reporter praised the film's depiction of gay black men, but criticized some of the vulgarity, concluding that the film "deals refreshingly, if at times too candidly, with the love lives of black gay characters".

== See also ==
- List of black films of the 2010s
