= Jazzmun =

American actress

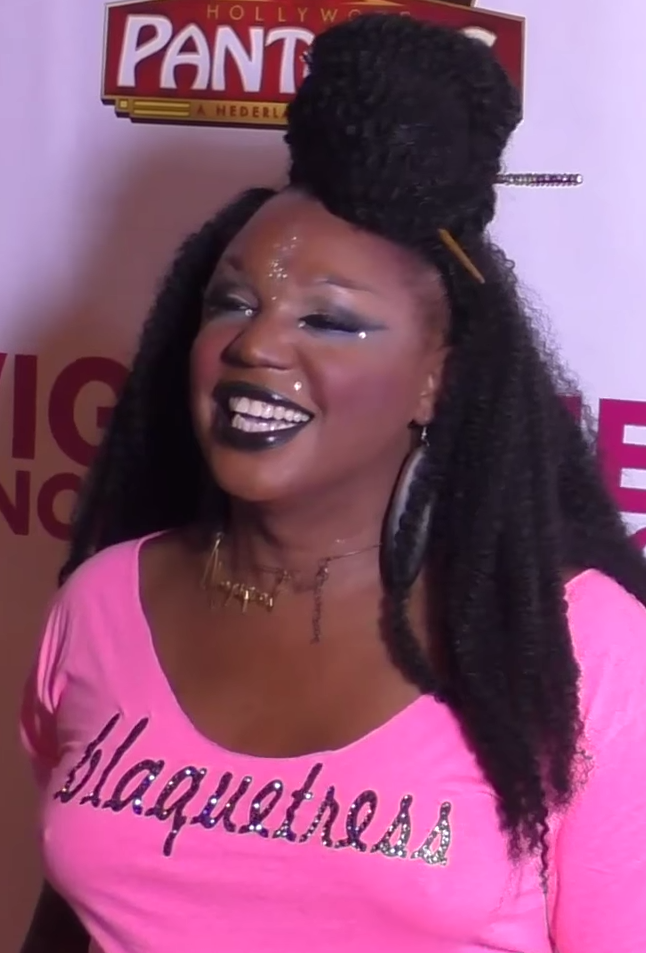
- Jazzmun in 2016
- Born: Nichcalo Dion Crayton; February 10, 1969 (age 57); San Diego, California, U.S.
- Occupations: Actress, performer
- Years active: 1984–present

Jazzmun (born February 10, 1969) is the stage name of Jazzmun Nichala Crayton, who is an American actress and nightclub performer, often working in the Los Angeles Area.

== Background ==
Originally from San Diego, California, Jazzmun made her first national television appearance on the talent variety show Puttin' on the Hits in 1984, in which she split her body half in male drag and half in female drag, lip synching as a "duet".

Finding work immediately after that appearance for her theatric and modeling talents, she moved to Los Angeles and secured an agent. Since then she has performed all over the world performing as either her stage character "Jazzmun"; her trademark Whitney Houston impersonation, which she performed as in the female stage revue La Cage; or any number of other characters. In the late 1990s Jazzmun co-starred in the stage play Ask Any Girl as the character Mahogany Saint Ross, a name play-on-words to singer Diana Ross.

Latina singer Gloria Estefan hired Jazzmun to perform in the music video of her remake hit "Everlasting Love" after seeing one of Jazzmun's performances. Later, drag icon RuPaul hired Jazzmun to also perform in his music video "A Little Bit of Love" which spoofed drag queens as aliens out to conquer the world. Jazzmun then released two of her own dance singles in 1997 on the Aqua Boogie label: "I'm Gonna Let You Have It" and "That Sound, That Beat". Later she produced another song "2 Tired 2 B Shady", which was later featured in Patrik-Ian Polk's show Noah's Arc.

After many years as a female impersonator, Jazzmun announced (circa 2008) she is a transgender woman. She has stated, "It's not so much as a physical thing but mental and spiritual for me." Jazzmun has played several drag queen and transvestite characters in film and television. Her first role playing a transgender character on television came in 1997 on The Wayans Bros..

In 2017, Jazzmun participated in a filmed letter to Hollywood written by Jen Richards, produced by GLAAD and ScreenCrush, asking for more and improved roles for transgender people.

She serves as an associate director of the Asian Pacific AIDS Intervention Team (APAIT).

== Select film resume ==
- In Full Bloom: Transcending Gender (film) (2015) – Participant
- Dreamgirls (2006) – Studio 54 Drag Queen
- Wristcutters (film) A Love Story (2006) – Transvestite
- The 40-Year-Old Virgin (2005) – Prostitute
- Hellbent (2004) – Black Pepper
- Punks (2000) – Chris/Crystal
- Blast from the Past (1999) – Hooker
- The Big Brass Ring (1999) – Little John John

== Select television resume ==
- Big Shots – Dontrelle
- Desperate Housewives – Transgender woman
- CSI: Crime Scene Investigation – Mercedes
- CSI: NY – Bambi
- Nip/Tuck – Transgender Man
- The John Larroquette Show – Pat/Patrick Drag Queen
- The Shield – Frank Gilmore
- Union Square – Drag Queen Doorman
- NYPD Blue – Peaches
- Roseanne – Diana Ross
- ER – Drag Queen
- The Cleaner – Tanya
- The Closer – Nancy
- The Wayans Bros – Albert/Alberta Transvestite
- Sons of Anarchy – Transgender Drug Dealer
- Gilmore Girls 2nd Season ep. 3 – Janet Jackson
- When We Rise – Bobbi Jean Baker
