= From Zero to I Love You =

2019 American romantic drama film

- Film poster
- Directed by: Doug Spearman
- Written by: Doug Spearman
- Produced by: Tommy Villafranca; Alan Koenigsberg; Rendell Bryce; Eric Daly; Laird McClure; Meade Thayer; Stephen W. Wallace; Vladislav Yashkov; Michael Busza
- Starring: Darryl Stephens; Scott Bailey
- Cinematography: Kevin Barry; Peter Steusloff
- Edited by: Christo Tsiaras
- Music by: Mervyn Warren; Malik Williams
- Production companies: Milton Ventures Media; 5 Child Productions; Esplanade Pictures
- Release date: March 26, 2019 (BFI Flare)
- Running time: 106 minutes
- Country: United States
- Language: English

From Zero to I Love You is an American romantic drama film, directed by Doug Spearman and released in 2019. The film stars Darryl Stephens as Pete Logsdon, a gay man whose fear of intimacy has led him to continually fall for married men, and Scott Bailey as Jack Dickinson, a closeted married gay man who becomes Pete's newest love interest and forces both men to confront what they really want in their romantic lives.

The cast also includes Leslie Zemeckis, Keili Lefkowitz, Richard Lawson, Jai Rodriguez, Jay Huguley and Al Sapienza.

The film premiered on March 26, 2019, at BFI Flare: London LGBT Film Festival. It has since screened at other LGBT-oriented film festivals, including the Inside Out Film and Video Festival in Toronto, QFlix in Philadelphia and the Tampa International Gay and Lesbian Film Festival in Tampa Bay.

== Cast ==
- Scott Bailey as Jack Dickinson
- Darryl Stephens as Pete Logsdon
- Adam Klesh as John Armitage
- Richard Lawson as Ron Logsdon
- Keili Lefkowitz as Karla Dickinson
- Ann Walker as Barbara
- Shane Johnson as Clay
- Matt Cipro as Rich
- Jai Rodriguez as Andrew
- Jay Huguley as Eric Dupont
- Stephen Bowman as David
- Al Sapienza as Tracey Thayer
- Gregory Zarian as Christopher Randolph
