= Canada Sings =

Canadian reality tv series (2011–2012)

- Genre: Music
- Presented by: Matte Babel
- Judges: Jann Arden; Vanilla Ice; Pierre Bouvier (season 1); Laurieann Gibson (season 2)
- Opening theme: "Part of Me" (season 2)
- Country of origin: Canada
- Original language: English
- No. of seasons: 2
- No. of episodes: 12

Production
- Executive producers: John Brunton; Barbara Bowlby
- Running time: 60 minutes
- Production company: Insight Production Company Ltd.

Original release
- Network: Global
- Release: August 3, 2011 – June 19, 2012

Canada Sings was a Canadian reality music competition that premiered on August 3, 2011 on Global. Each episode features two glee clubs representing various organizations and companies, who both prepare and perform a song and dance number for a panel of judges—with the winner winning money towards a charity.

The second and final season premiered on May 15, 2012, at 10:00 p.m.

== Series overview ==
Season	Episodes	Originally released	
Season	Episodes	First released	Last released
1	6	August 3, 2011	September 8, 2011
2	6	May 15, 2012	June 5, 20120

== Season 1 (2011) ==
Teams

- 1-800-GOT-JUNK as "Junk Notes"
- Air Canada as "Airborne11"
- Eric Hamber Secondary School as "The Edutones"
- GoodLife Fitness as "The Power Chords"
- Hamilton Police as "Hammer Cruisers"
- Just Energy as "Just Energetics"
- Lone Wolf Real Estate Technologies as "Wolf Pack"
- Scarborough General Hospital as "Pulse"
- The Keg as "Team Keg Spirits"
- The Distillery Restaurants Corp. as "Run DRC"
- Toronto Fire Services as "The Sound of Fire"
- Toronto Zoo as "The Zooperstars"

Host

- Matte Babel

Judges

- Jann Arden
- Pierre Bouvier
- Vanilla Ice

Coaches

Episodes

No. overall	No. in season	Title	Original release date
1	1	"The Junk Notes vs. The Zooperstars"	August 3, 2011
Winner: The Junk Notes, Charity: Harmony House Centre for Autism Research and Education Society
2	2	"Just Energetics vs. The Sound of Fire"	August 10, 2011
Winner: The Sound of Fire, Charity: Camp BUCKO
3	3	"Airborne11 vs. Wolf Pack"	August 17, 2011
Winner: Airborne11, Charity: Ronald McDonald House Toronto
4	4	"Hammer Cruisers vs. The Power Chords"	August 24, 2011
Winner: Hammer Cruisers, Charity: Project Concern
5	5	"Pulse vs. Team Keg Spirits"	September 1, 2011
Winner: Pulse, Charity: The Scarborough Hospital Foundation
6	6	"Run DRC vs. The Edutones"	September 8, 2011
Winner: The Edutones, Charity: BC Children Hospital

== Season 2 (2012) ==
Teams

- Dumas Mining as "Dumas Rocks" (Charity: CNIB Lake Joseph Centre)
- Elmwood Spa as "InSPAration" (Charity: YWCA Elm Centre)
- GO Transit as "GO Glee" (Charity: The United Way)
- Ontario Provincial Police as "Project Glee" (Charity: The Dave Mounsey Memorial Fund)
- Ontario Science Centre as "The OSCillations" (Charity: Adopt-a-Class)
- Peel Children's Aid Society as "Positively Peel" (Charity: Peel Children's Aid Foundation)
- Purdy's Chocolates as "Sweet Day" (Charity: MS Canada Society)
- Royal Bank of Canada (RBC) as "The Bank Notes" (Charity: Six Nations Community Food Bank)
- Royal Canadian Air Force Band as "Super Sonic" (Charity: Soldier On)
- Stampede Casino as "Deal With It" (Charity: Plan Canada)
- Canadian Automobile Association (CAA) as "The Associates" (Charity: Sick Kids Foundation)
- WestJet's "Cabin Pressure" (Charity: Alberta Children's Hospital)

Host

- Matte Babel

Judges

- Jann Arden
- Laurieann Gibson
- Vanilla Ice

Coaches

- Scott Henderson (Vocal Coach)
- Kelly Konno (Choreographer)
- Sharron Matthews (Vocal Coach)
- Christian Vincent (Choreographer)

Episodes

No. overall	No. in season	Title	Original release date
7	1	WestJet vs Ontario Provincial Police	May 15, 2012
Winner: Cabin Pressure, Charity: Alberta Children's Hospital
8	2	"Super Sonic vs. Positively Peel"	May 22, 2012
Winner: Super Sonic, Charity: Soldier On
9	3	"OSCillations vs. The Associates"	May 29, 2012
Winner: Canadian Automobile Association (CAA), Charity: Sick Kids Foundation
10	4	"Dumas Rocks vs. Elmwood InSPAration"	June 5, 2012
Winner: Dumas Mining, Charity: CNIB Lake Joseph Centre
11	5	"RBC vs. Stampede Casino"	June 12, 2012
Tie: Royal Bank of Canada / Stampede Casino, Charities: Six Nations Community Food Bank / Plan Canada
12	6	"GO Glee vs. Sweet Day"	June 19, 2012
Winner: Purdy's "Sweet Day", Charity: MS Canada Society
