= King Mustafa Obafemi =

American actor

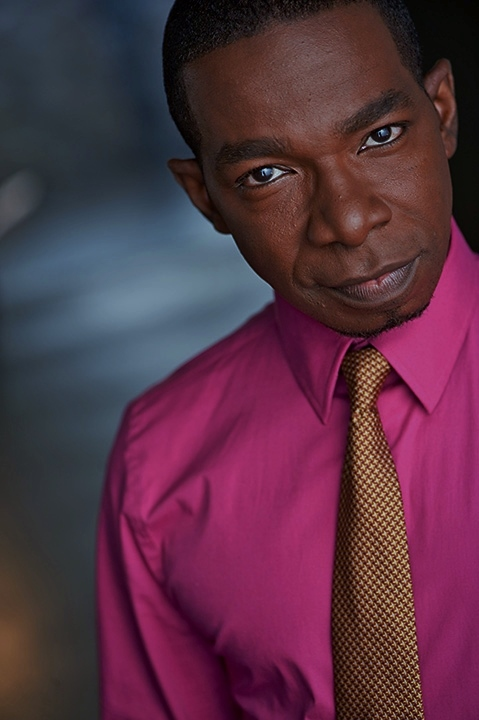
- Education: State University of New York, Purchase (BFA)
- Occupation: Actor
- Years active: 1991–present

King Mustafa Obafemi (formerly Dwight Ewell) is an American actor known for his roles in films such as Chasing Amy, Flirt, Amateur, Dogma and Man of the Century.

== Early life ==
Ewell's father fought in Vietnam and served six years in the United States military while Dwight's mother took care of Dwight and his younger sister. Unhappy in her marriage, at 21 years old, Dwight's mother took the children up North where she felt that she could begin pursuing her career as a singer. The three moved several times before ending up in the Stella Wright Housing Projects on Prince Street, in Newark, New Jersey.

Ewell and his sister attended the Louise A. Spencer Elementary School in Newark in the mid-1970s. In later years, he was enrolled in The Gifted and Talented Program in the same school. At the age of nine, he began writing plays that the teachers would allow him to direct and the students to perform.

At the age of 13, Ewell auditioned for and was accepted into Arts High School in Newark, New Jersey. In 1986, he graduated, and in the fall of that year he attended the State University of New York's Theater Arts and Film Divisions Acting Program for four years.

== Career ==
Ewell has worked extensively in independent and art house films. Ewell is perhaps best known for his performance in Kevin Smith's Chasing Amy, in which he plays the role of "Hooper X", an African American writer of black militant comic books, who is secretly gay but employs the public persona of a violent militant who denounces the Star Wars trilogy as racist.

Ewell has collaborated with director Hal Hartley on short and feature-length films; including Amateur and Flirt.

He has also worked with director Daisy von Scherler Mayer twice, in the films Party Girl and The Guru.

Ewell has worked with film producer Christine Vachon twice, on the films Stonewall and Kiss Me, Guido.

Ewell starred in writer-director Patrik-Ian Polk's 2000 film Punks.

Following his last film role in 2011, he was performing as a stage actor in the Los Angeles area prior to suffering an unspecified injury in 2013.

He made a comeback to acting in films with his role as Tom in Hal Hartley's Where To Land in 2025, and has made many public appearances since then, most notably with Kevin Smith at Smodcastle Cinemas in 2024 for a screening of Chasing Amy with a Q&A after the film.

== Filmography ==
Genre	Year	Title	Role	Episodes	Notes
Short film	1992	Cowboy Jesus	Disciple #2		8 minutes; New York University student film
Short film	1992	Heavy Blow			23 minutes; Columbia University student film
Short film	1993	Flirt	Dwight		23 minutes; directed by Hal Hartley
Film	1994	Amateur	Boy Squatter		
Short film	1994	NYC 3/94			9 minutes; directed by Hal Hartley
Film	1994	Someone Else's America	Video-man		
Film	1995	Flirt	Dwight		
Film	1995	Party Girl	He-He-Hello Trio		
Film	1995	Stonewall	Helen Wheels		
Short film	1997	Anton, Mailman	Bartender		
TV series	1997	Brooklyn South	Bystander	"Love Hurts"	
Film	1997	Chasing Amy	Hooper X		
Film	1997	Kiss Me, Guido	Usher		
Film	1997	Niagara, Niagara	Toy Store Manager		
Commercial	1998	Budweiser	(principal performer)		directed by Spike Lee
Film	1999	The Debtors			
Film	1999	Dogma	Kane, Gang Leader		
Film	1999	Hey, Joel	Baby Shiv		
Film	1999	Man of the Century	Richard Lancaster		
Film	1999	On the Run	Rasta		
Film	1999	The Pavilion	Robert Owa		
Film	1999	The Waiting Game	Joe		
Film	2000	Endsville	Shawn Walker		
Film	2000	The Intern	Gustave		
Film	2000	Punks	Hill		
Film	2001	Jay and Silent Bob Strike Back	Hooper LaMont		
Film	2002	The Guru	Peaches		
Film	2002	Wheelmen	Terry		
Short film	2003	A mi amor mi dulce	Dom Doos Po Phool (DomDoos Poefool)		23 minutes
Film	2004	Pagans	Max Stone		
Short film	2007	2 Fast 2 Furry	Corvette Guy		
Film	2007	Fighting Words	Leopold		
TV series	2009	90210	Mr. Irving / Health Teacher	"Zero Tolerance" "To New Beginnings!"	
TV series	2009	Adult Film: A Hollywood Tale	Hal Calloway		
TV series	2009	Twentysixmiles	Dill Truman Fontaine	"Pilot"	recurring
Film	2009	Yes To Victory	Norman		
Film	2010	Eagles in the Chicken Coop	Hal Calloway		
TV series	2010	Medium	The Florist	"Allison Rolen Got Married"	
Film	2010	Street Poet	Leopold		
Film	2011	Here's the Kicker	Norman		
Film	2025	Where To Land	Tom		
