= Darryl Stephens =

American actor and author

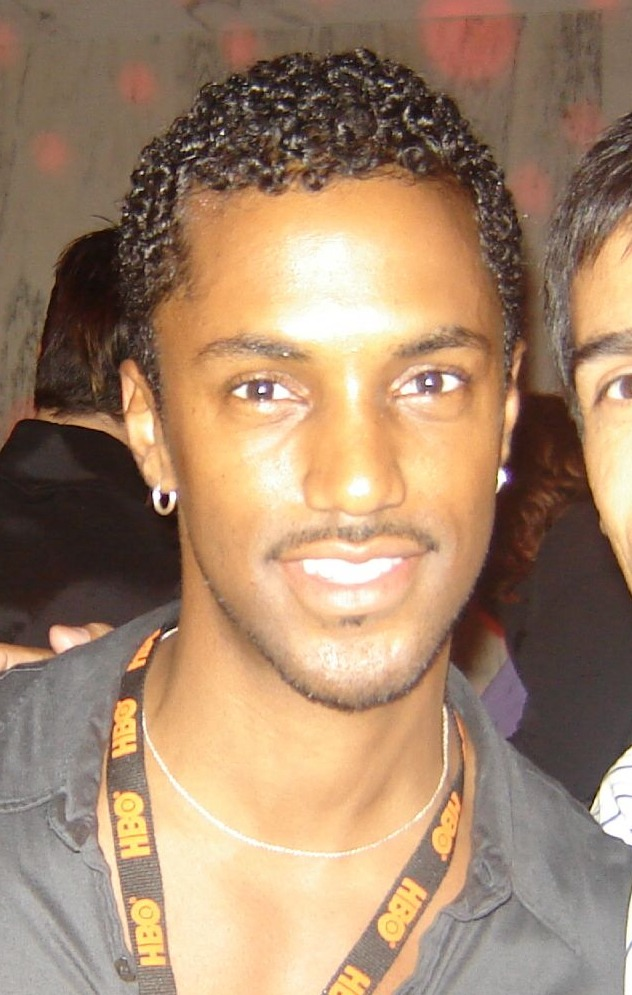
- Stephens in 2015
- Born: Darryl Stephens; Pasadena, California, U.S.
- Occupations: Actor, author
- Years active: 1999–present

Darryl Stephens is an American actor and author. He is best known for playing Noah Nicholson on the television dramedy Noah's Arc.

== Early life ==
Stephens grew up in Altadena and Pasadena California and after college moved to the city of Los Angeles.

== Film career ==
Back in L.A., Stephens appeared on the sexy late-night serial MTV's Undressed, the short-lived series That's Life, and VH1's Red Eye. During the same period, he was also appearing in various commercials for products such as Dockers and performing in small theater venues and scene study classes. He also played a "future funked" Greta in a Hollywood revival of the well-known play Bent.

Stephens had supporting roles in the films Seamless (with Shannon Elizabeth), Not Quite Right, and Circuit. However, his breakout role came in 2004, when independent filmmaker Patrik-Ian Polk cast him as the lead character for the new series Noah's Arc. The original intention was for the show to be released direct-to-DVD after it had received rave reviews at various film festivals. However, in the fall of 2005, LOGO picked up Noah's Arc, which debuted on October 19.

In August 2006 the second season of Noah's Arc was televised. By the end of 2006, Stephens had completed roles in the comedy Another Gay Movie and the drama Boy Culture, the latter alongside newcomer Derek Magyar.

In October 2008, a feature film version was release. Noah's Arc: Jumping the Broom picks up where the show's second season left off and tells the story of the marriage between Stephens' character and Jensen Atwood's.

In 2010, he guest starred in an episode of Private Practice, playing a transgender woman. His next film, released in 2011, was Bolden!, a bio film about jazz great Buddy Bolden starring Anthony Mackie as Bolden. Stephens' role is of cornet player Frank Lewis.

Stephens played the recurring role Gideon on B Positive on CBS.

== Other ==
Stephens released a self-published novel in 2011, entitled Shortcomings, which weaves together short stories he had written previously.

== Personal life ==
Although Stephens is reluctant to discuss his personal life, he is gay and his roles address issues of classism and sexuality. In August 2020, he became a father to a daughter with a surrogate.

== Filmography ==
=== Film ===
Year	Title	Role	Notes
1999	Seamless: Kidz Rule	Devin	
2001	Circuit	Julian	
2004	Noah's Arc: The Short Film	Noah Nicholson	
2005	Not Quite Right	Evan	
2006	Boy Culture	Andrew	
2006	Another Gay Movie	Angel	
2008	Tranny McGuyver	Conrad the Pimp	Short
2008	Noah's Arc: Jumping the Broom	Noah Nicholson	
2010	Love Unconditional	Jackson	Short
2010	Reunited	Howard	
2012	The Skinny	Nurse Nicholson	
2012	V Day	Travis	Short
2012	Something Like a Butterfly	Put-Put	Short
2013	Hot Guys with Guns	Tim Sampson	
2014	Secrets & Toys	Chad	Short
2014	Tiger Orange	Scott	
2014	Beyond the Lights	Quentin	
2015	Stronger	Andy	Short
2015	You're Gay... Now What?	Love Interest	Short
2016	Pee-wee's Big Holiday	Rene	
2016	Killer Assistant	Charles	TV movie
2016	Coffee House Chronicles	Jeff	
2017	Captain Black	Party Goer	
2017	How to Be a Slut in America	-	
2018	Groomzilla	Officiant	TV movie
2018	Congo Cabaret	Emcee	Short
2018	I May Regret	Dillon	
2019	A Different Direction	Travis Mitchell	Short
2019	From Zero to I Love You	Pete Logsdon	
2020	Noah's Arc: The 'Rona Chronicles	Noah Nicholson	Special
2025	Noah's Arc: The Movie	Noah Nicholson	

=== Television ===
Year	Title	Role	Notes
2000	Undressed	Rudy	Episode: "Scary Movies"
2001	That's Life	Tutor	Episode: "Heart Problems"
2005-06	Noah's Arc	Noah Nicholson	Main Cast
2006	Ugly Betty	Waiter	Episode: "After Hours"
2009	Rick & Steve	JP (voice)	Episode: "House of Race Cards"
2009	In the Moment	Activist	Episode: "The Bad News"
2010	Two and a Half Men	Man #1	Episode: "Yay, No Polyps!"
2010	Private Practice	Jane Finch	Episode: "Short Cuts"
2011	Desperate Housewives	Terrence	Episode: "And Lots of Security..."
2011	Ringer	Gregor	Episode: "If You Ever Want a French Lesson..."
2011	Reed Between the Lines	Perry	Episode: "Let's Talk About Change"
2012	DTLA	Lenny	Main Cast
2012	2 Broke Girls	Nevel	Episode: "And the Big Opening"
2014	Survivor's Remorse	Stacey	Episode: "Out of the Past"
2015	Coffee House Chronicles	Jeff	Episode: "An Exception"
2015	Young & Hungry	Hot Guy	Episode: "Young & Back to Normal"
2017	S.W.A.T.	Alexander	Episode: "Pamilya"
2018-19	But She's My Best Friend	Stephen	Guest: Season 1, Recurring Cast: Season 2
2019	Good Trouble	Craig	Episode: "In The Middle"
2020	Twenties	D'Manuel	Episode: "You Know How I Like It"
2020	Broke	Jeremy	Episode: "Dates"
2020	Lovecraft Country	Billie Holiday	Episode: "Strange Case"
2020	Saved by the Bell	Dean/Jean	Episode: "Pilot" & "All in the Hall"
2020-22	B Positive	Gideon	Recurring Cast: Season 1, Main Cast: Season 2
2021-22	Boy Culture: Generation X	Andrew	Main Cast
2022	Demonhuntr	Anansi	Episode: "Bawdy Horror"
2022	Angelyne	Pete	Episode: "Glow in the Dark Queen of the Universe"

== Awards and nominations ==
Ovation Awards

- 2011: Nominated for Featured Actor in a Play for the role of Victoria in the Bootleg Theatre production of "The Interlopers"

== Notes ==
http://www.thebody.com/content/80676/making-black-gay-lives-matter-a-conversation-with-.html

http://www.thebody.com/content/80679/untying-tongues-a-conversation-with-darryl-stephen.html
