= Noah's Arc: The Movie =

- Directed by: Patrik-Ian Polk
- Written by: John R. Gordon; Patrik-Ian Polk; Rikki Beadle Blair
- Produced by: Dwight Allen O'Neal
- Starring: Darryl Stephens; Christian Vincent; Doug Spearman; Rodney Chester; Jensen Atwood
- Cinematography: Alexander Chinnici
- Edited by: Christopher Scott Cherot; Lousine Shamamian
- Music by: Matt Head
- Production company: MTV Entertainment Studios
- Distributed by: Paramount+
- Release date: June 20, 2025 (US)
- Running time: 84 minutes
- Country: United States
- Language: English

Noah's Arc: The Movie, is a 2025 American romantic comedy-drama film based on the LOGO television series Noah's Arc. It was released on June 20, 2025 on the Paramount+ streaming service.

This film comes 20 years after the show debuted on the LOGO in 2005 and 17 years after the first film Noah's Arc: Jumping the Broom in 2008, and 5 years after the 2020 special Noah’s Arc: The ‘Rona Chronicles.

== Synopsis ==
The film follows the titular Noah and his partner Wade who are expecting twins and must “shift gears” after each is offered their dream job, and the couple clashes over which one will assume the role of stay-at-home parent.

== Legacy ==
The film earned a 2026 Emmy nomination for Outstanding Choreography for Scripted Programming.

== Cast ==
- Darryl Stephens as Noah Nicholson-Robinson
- Rodney Chester as Alex Kirby-Iverson
- Christian Vincent as Ricky Davis
- Doug Spearman as Chance Counter-McIntyre
- Jensen Atwood as Wade Robinson
- Wilson Cruz as Dr. Junito Vargas
- Mariyea as Olivia Kirby-Iverson
- Jonathan Julian as Eddie McIntyre
- Gregory Kieth as Trey Iverson
- Eva Marcille as Marley
- Ts Madison as Miss Genevieve
- Kennedy Davenport as Queen Kennedy
- Dynasty St. James as Queen Dynasty
- Angela Beyincé as Melissa
- Jasmine Guy as Nana Ladonya
