= Renoly Santiago =

Puerto Rican actor (born 1974)

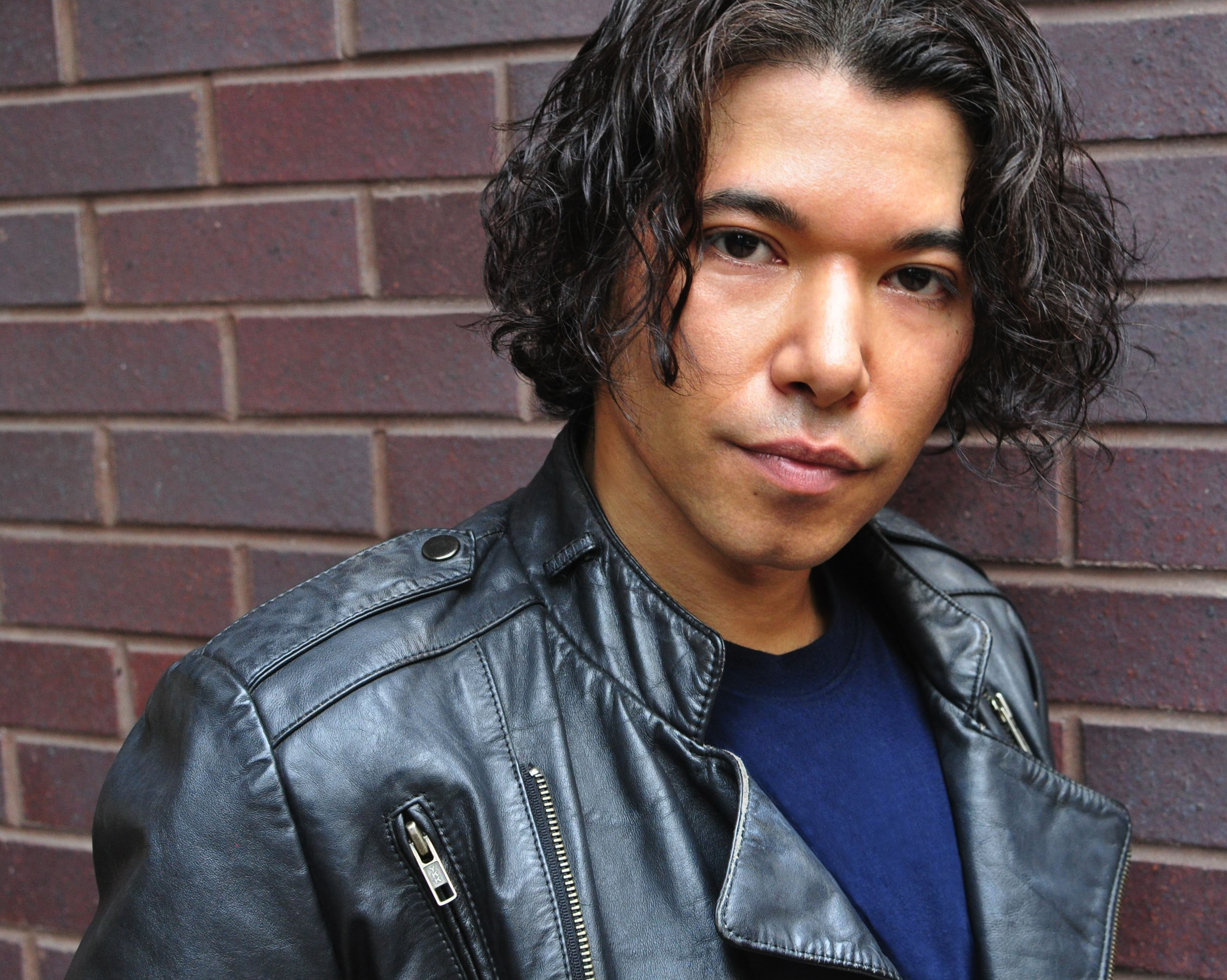
- Santiago in 2011
- Born: March 15, 1974 (age 52); Lajas, Puerto Rico
- Occupations: Actor; singer; writer
- Years active: 1993–present

Renoly Santiago (born March 15, 1974) is a Puerto Rican actor, singer and writer known for his appearances in films such as Dangerous Minds, Hackers and Con Air, and in television series such as Touched by an Angel and Law & Order: Criminal Intent.

== Early life ==
Renoly Santiago was born in Lajas, Puerto Rico. He was raised in Union City, New Jersey.

== Career ==
Santiago first became known in the United States when he was cast in the 1993 television series CityKids as Tito. He co-wrote the Emmy nominated pilot episode of the show. From his participation in CityKids, Santiago graduated to film, acting as Raúl Sanchero in 1995's Dangerous Minds. By 1996, he was co-starring alongside some other well-known Hollywood actors in his role as Ramόn Sánchez, a.k.a. the "Phantom Phreak" in Hackers. He also plays Mikey in Daylight.

Santiago starred as Ramón Martínez, an androgynous criminal nicknamed "Sally-Can't Dance," in the 1997 film Con Air. Santiago then took three years off from acting on-screen and starred on Broadway in Paul Simon's The Capeman as Tony "Umbrella Man" Hernandez, leader of the gang The Vampires, a role for which he was a 1998 Drama Desk Nominee for Outstanding Featured Actor in a Musical.

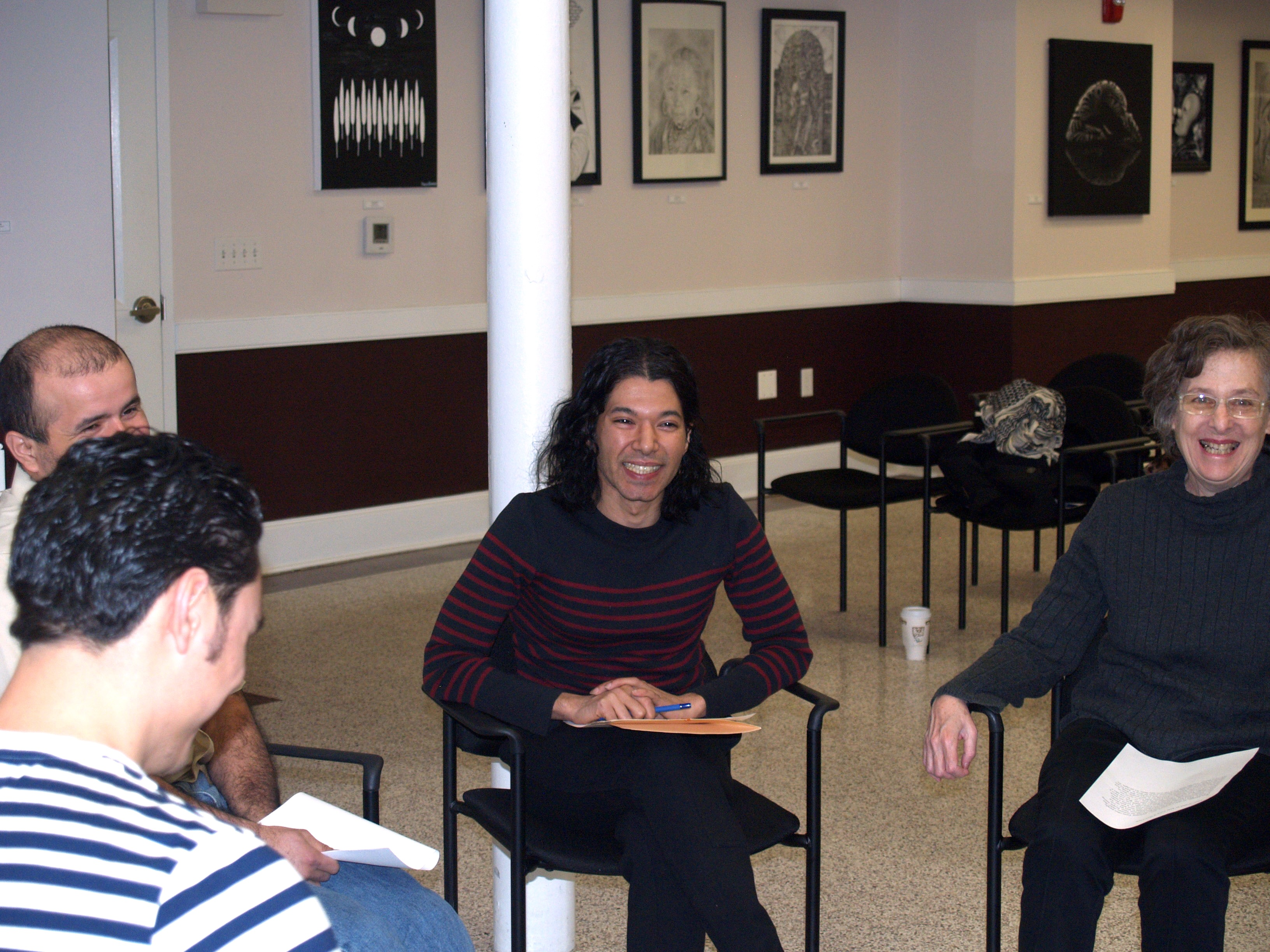
Santiago (center) teaching a 2014 acting course in his boyhood home of Union City, New Jersey

As a singer, Santiago has recorded with performers Marc Anthony, Paul Simon, Danny Rivera and La India.

In 2000, he returned to the screen in the low-budget film Punks, in which he plays Dante, which was shown at the Sundance Film Festival. By 2001, Santiago was back on television, playing Miguel Acosta in the January 7 episode of Touched by an Angel, making a small appearance in the March 29 episode of Big Apple and as Chiggy Rios in Law & Order: Criminal Intent in the episode "The Faithful'.

In 2002, Santiago made a film called The Street King, where he played the character Cesar Rojas. It was not a major hit, and Santiago took another three-year sabbatical from screen acting. Santiago returned to film in 2005, as "Scorpio" in Just Another Romantic Wrestling Comedy. In early 2011, he starred as Johnny Pacheco in the Hector Lavoe salsa biopic The King. Santiago will appear in Grand Street in which he stars with Kelly McGillis.

Santiago wrote a screenplay titled “Union City Streets” with filmmaker Mario Cerrito in 2013.

From March 6 to May 8, 2014, Santiago taught professional acting classes at The William V. Musto Cultural Center in his boyhood home of Union City, New Jersey. The ten-week course was initiated as part of the Grace Theatre Workshop, and consisted of monologue and scene studies.

== Personal life ==
Santiago lives in New York City.

== Filmography ==
Year	Title	Role	Notes
1993	CityKids		
1995	CBS Schoolbreak Special		
1995	Dangerous Minds	Raul Sanchero	
1995	Hackers	Ramόn Sánchez / "The Phantom Phreak"	
1996	Daylight	Mikey	
1997	Con Air	Ramon "Sally-Can't Dance" Martinez	credited as "Renoly"
2000	Punks		
2001	Touched by an Angel		
2001	Law & Order: Criminal Intent		
2002	King Rikki		
2013	Winners & Losers		
2014	Grand Street		
2015	The Networker		
2016	The Night Of		
2016	Difficult People		
2017	The Get Down		

== See also ==
- List of Puerto Ricans
