= Rodney Chester =

American actor

Rodney Chester (born 1965) is an American actor. He is best known for his role as Alex Kirby on the Logo sitcom Noah's Arc.

== Biography ==
Originally from Cocoa, Florida, Chester graduated from Cocoa High School in 1983 and Bethune-Cookman College with honors before moving to Los Angeles to pursue dancing, choreography and theater. He has worked with notable performers, including Whitney Houston, Diana Ross, and Prince.

He later met Noah's Arc creator Patrik-Ian Polk, which led to his acting debut in the independent film Punks, also directed by Polk. While Polk was working on Noah's Arc, he called Chester, specifying that he had a role available for him.

In his personal life, Chester continues to dance and runs a talent agency in Beverly Hills.

== Filmography ==
=== Film ===
Year	Title	Role
2000	Punks	Alexis Carrington Colby Dexter
2002	Shteps	Transvestite
2004	Noah's Arc: The Short Film	Alex Kirby
2008	Noah's Arc: Jumping the Broom	Alex Kirby
2020	Noah's Arc: The 'Rona Chronicles	Alex Kirby
2020	As I Am	Kevin
2025	Noah's Arc: The Movie	Alex Kirby

=== Television ===
Year	Title	Role	Ref.
2005-2006	Noah's Arc	Alex Kirby	main cast, 17 episodes
2021	Trace	Stage Manager Charles	
