= Punks (film) =

- Directed by: Patrik-Ian Polk
- Written by: Patrik-Ian Polk
- Produced by: Kenneth "Babyface" Edmonds; Tracey Edmonds; Michael McQuarn; Patrik-Ian Polk
- Starring: Seth Gilliam; Dwight Ewell; Renoly Santiago; Rockmond Dunbar; Jazzmun; Rudolf Martin
- Release date: January 25, 2000
- Running time: 91 minutes
- Country: United States
- Language: English
- Box office: $160,083

Punks is a 2000 American film produced by Babyface, written and directed by Patrik-Ian Polk, and starring Rockmond Dunbar, Seth Gilliam, Renoly Santiago, Jazzmun, and Dwight Ewell.

The film follows the trials and tribulations of a group of gay African American friends. While black gay life is explored in the film, universal aspects of friendship plays at the plot's forefront. The film's themes were later used for the 2005 Logo cable television series Noah's Arc.

The film was popular at film festivals but never had distribution due to rights issues with the Sister Sledge songs featured prominently in the story. It was shown on Logo on August 7, 2011. Otherwise it remains unavailable through home media but has occasional private screenings.

== Cast ==
- Seth Gilliam as Marcus
- Dwight Ewell as Hill
- Renoly Santiago as Dante
- Rockmond Dunbar as Darby
- Jazzmun as Chris/Crystal
- Rudolf Martin as Gilbert
- Vanessa Estelle Williams as Jennifer
- Devon Odessa as Felicity
- Loretta Devine as Health Counselor
- Rodney Chester as Alexis Carrington Colby Dexter
- Thea Vidale as Nurse

== Awards and nominations ==
- Black Reel Awards
  - Best Independent Actor - Theatrical:
    - (Rockmond Dunbar) Winner
- Cleveland International Film Festival
  - Best American Independent Feature Film: Winner
- GLAAD Media Awards
  - Outstanding Film - Limited Release: Nominated
- Independent Spirit Awards
  - John Cassavetes Award:
    - (Patrik-Ian Polk, Tracey Edmonds and Michael McQuarn) Nominated
- L.A. Outfest
  - Outstanding Emerging Talent:
    - (Patrik-Ian Polk) Winner
