= Rockmond Dunbar =

American actor (born 1973)

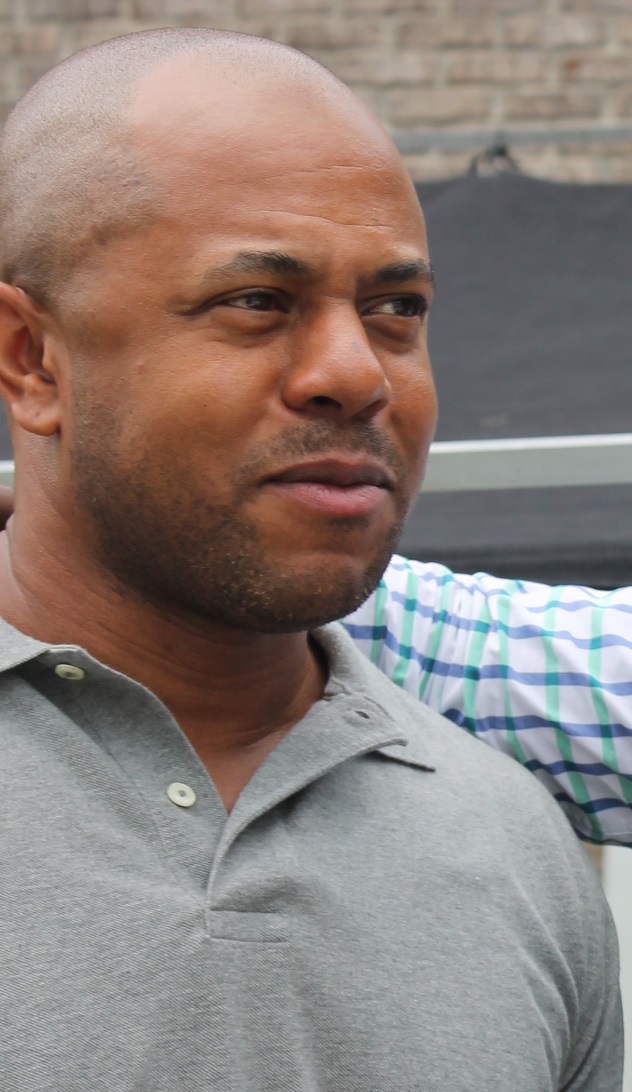
- Dunbar in 2014
- Born: January 11, 1973 (age 53); Oakland, California, U.S.
- Occupation: Actor
- Years active: 1993–present
- Spouses: Ivy Holmes (m. 2003; div. 2006); Maya Gilbert (m. 2013)
- Children: 4

Rockmond Dunbar (born January 11, 1973) is an American actor, best known for his roles as Kenny Chadway on Showtime family drama Soul Food, and Benjamin Miles "C-Note" Franklin on the Fox crime drama Prison Break. He also played Sheriff Eli Roosevelt on the FX Drama series Sons of Anarchy, FBI Agent Dennis Abbott on The Mentalist, FBI Agent Abe Gaines in the Hulu series The Path, and Michael Grant on 9-1-1.

== Early life and education ==
Dunbar was born January 11, 1973, in Oakland, California. He attended Oakland Technical High School and attended Morehouse College for one year before moving on to study at the College of Santa Fe and the University of New Mexico.

== Career ==
=== Television ===
Dunbar is known for his leading role as Kenny Chadway on the television series Soul Food, and TV Guide named him as one of "Television's 50 Sexiest Stars of All Time". He landed a regular role as Benjamin Miles "C-Note" Franklin on the television series Prison Break. In 2007, Dunbar starred on the short-lived TNT medical drama Heartland. He made a guest appearance on Noah's Arc as himself to give Noah (screenwriter and the main character of the show) some ideas about his movie Fine Art. He also had a recurring role on the UPN series Girlfriends, and is also known for his role as "Pookie" on the television series The Game. He was also a regular on the short-lived FX series Terriers.

Dunbar's other TV credits include guest appearances in Earth 2, Felicity, The Pretender, Two Guys and a Girl, and North Shore.

In 2011, he joined the cast of FX's show Sons of Anarchy as the new Sheriff of Charming, Eli Roosevelt. In 2013, Dunbar joined the CBS crime drama The Mentalist as FBI agent Dennis Abbott. In 2018, Dunbar joined the cast of 9-1-1 as Michael Grant, leaving in 2021 over the COVID-19 vaccine mandate, after his requests for exemptions were denied.

In February 2022, it was reported that he has sued the makers of the show for $1 million, saying he "was denied medical and religious exemptions and faced racial discrimination." In July 25, 2022, Dunbar's case of racial misconduct was dismissed as baseless by a judge in a Los Angeles courtroom, but Disney/Fox does face some claims from Rockmond Dunbar alleging religious and racial discrimination, retaliation and breach of contract, among other claims. Dunbar based his reason for an exemption on the fact that he had an exemption letter from the Congregation of Universal Wisdom. The New York Times reported that all it takes to join the church is a letter to chiropractor Walter P. Schilling, who runs the congregation from his den, and accepts as members those who confirm that they "will aspire to live by" the beliefs of the church, and have paid at least $1 to the church as a sign of commitment. The studio pointed out that he had taken many actions that go against the beliefs of the church, including undergoing medical procedures, but he said in response that he had spoken with God, who "permitted [him] to act differently." U.S. District Judge Dolly Gee was skeptical of his claims, stating that communing with God is not a "blanket privilege that undermines our system of ordered liberty," but decided that the lawsuit could head to trial. On October 17, 2025, Dunbar lost the case as an eight-member federal jury voted unanimously in favor of Disney-owned 20th Television.

=== Film ===
His film projects include Punks (which debuted at the 2000 Sundance Film Festival), Misery Loves Company, Sick Puppies, Whodunit, Dirty Laundry, All About You, Kiss Kiss Bang Bang, and the Tyler Perry-produced film, The Family That Preys.

=== Other ===
Dunbar has contributed to the art world through the mixed media exhibit ARTHERAPY. He posed for the November 2003 issue of Playgirl magazine.

== Personal life ==
From 2003 to 2006, Dunbar was married to Ivy Holmes.

On December 30, 2012, Dunbar became engaged, after dating for a year, to Maya Gilbert, an actress, in Montego Bay, Jamaica.

Dunbar is a member of the Congregation of Universal Wisdom, whose members are "obligated to avoid medical intervention that introduces disease into the body". His lawsuit against Disney and Fox alleges that their lawyers called his religion "fake" and his beliefs "insincere" in discussions about the Covid-19 vaccination mandate.

According to DNA analysis, Dunbar's ancestry is mainly from the Yoruba people of Nigeria. On his visit to Nigeria, he was given the Yoruba name, Omobowale (a variant form of Omowale) meaning "our son has come home."

== Filmography ==
=== Film ===
Year	Film	Role	Notes
1993	Misery Loves Company	Eric Haynes	
2000	Punks	Darby	
2001	All About You	Tim	
2004	Hollywood Division	Det. Reginald Feiffer	TV movie
2005	Kiss Kiss Bang Bang	Mr. Fire	
2006	Dirty Laundry	Patrick/Sheldon	
2008	The Family That Preys	Chris	
2008	Alien Raiders	Kane	
2008	Jada	Simon	
2009	Pastor Brown	Amir Rahiem	
2011	The Truth	–	Short
2012	A Taste of Romance	Danny Marsh	TV movie
2012	Echo at 11 Oak Drive	Abner	
2012	Raising Izzie	Greg Freeman	TV movie
2013	Doubt	Steve Adams	TV movie
2014	More to Love	Terrence	
2014	Envy or Greed	Anderson Connell	Short
2015	Love Is a Four-Letter Word	Nick	TV movie
2015	Curve Ball	James	
2016	Fate	Enzo Friend	Short
2017	The Cheaters Club	Eric	
2018	Edge of Fear	Mike Dwyer	
2018	City of Lies	Dreadlocks	
2022	Red Winter	Harold	
2025	Straw	Chief Wilson	
2025	One Spoon of Chocolate	Mr. Lindsey	

=== Television ===
Year	Title	Role	Notes
1994–95	Earth 2	Baines	Recurring cast
1996	The Lazarus Man	Patter	Episode: "The Penance"
1997	Good News	Bonz	Episode: "Writing on the Wall" & "A Joyful Noise"
1998	The Wayans Bros.	Barry	Episode: "The Son of Marlon"
1998	Two Guys, a Girl and a Pizza Place	Tommy	Episode: "Two Guys, a Girl and a Homecoming"
1999	Pacific Blue	Tiger Bates	Episode: "Infierno"
1999	The Practice	Byron Little	Episode: "Infected"
1999	The Pretender	Joe Taylor	Episode: "Qallupilluit"
1999	Felicity	Man on Train	Episode: "The Depths"
2000	G vs E	Sonny Rhymes	Episode: "Renunciation"
2000–04	Soul Food	Kenny Chadway	Main cast
2003–04	Girlfriends	Jalen	Guest: season 3, recurring cast: season 4
2004	North Shore	Agent Fernley	Episode: "Secret Service"
2005	Head Cases	Dr. Robinson	Recurring cast
2005–17	Prison Break	Benjamin Miles "C-Note" Franklin	Main cast: Season 1–2 & 5, recurring cast: Season 4
2007	Heartland	Dr. Thomas Jonas	Main cast
2007	Shark	Teddy Banks	Episode: "No Holds Barred"
2007	Grey's Anatomy	Sean Brotherton	Episode: "Physical Attraction... Chemical Reaction"
2007	CSI: Miami	James Reilly	Episode: "Guerillas in the Mist"
2009–15	The Game	Pookie	Guest: season 3, recurring cast: season 5–9
2010	Private Practice	Jacob Deever	Episode: "All in the Family"
2010	The Defenders	Bounce	Episode: "Nevada v. Killa Diz"
2010	Terriers	Det. Mark Gustafson	Main cast
2011	The Chicago Code	Robert Turner	Episode: "O'Leary's Cow"
2011	The Closer	Antwone Decker	Episode: "Unknown Trouble"
2011–13	Sons of Anarchy	Sheriff Eli Roosevelt	Recurring cast: season 4–6
2012–13	For Richer or Poorer	Aubrey	Main cast
2013–15	The Mentalist	FBI Agent Dennis Abbott	Main cast: Season 6–7
2016–17	The Path	Detective Abe Gaines	Main cast: season 1–2
2017	Scorpion	Scotty	Recurring cast: season 3
2018–21	9-1-1	Michael Grant	Main cast: season 1–5
2021	Aftershock	Lawrence Ansley	Recurring cast
2021–22	The Game	Pookie	2 episodes
2024	Law & Order	Principal Sykes	Episode: "Report Card"
2024	Fight Night: The Million Dollar Heist	Uncle Willie	Miniseries
