= John R. Gordon =

British writer (born 1964)

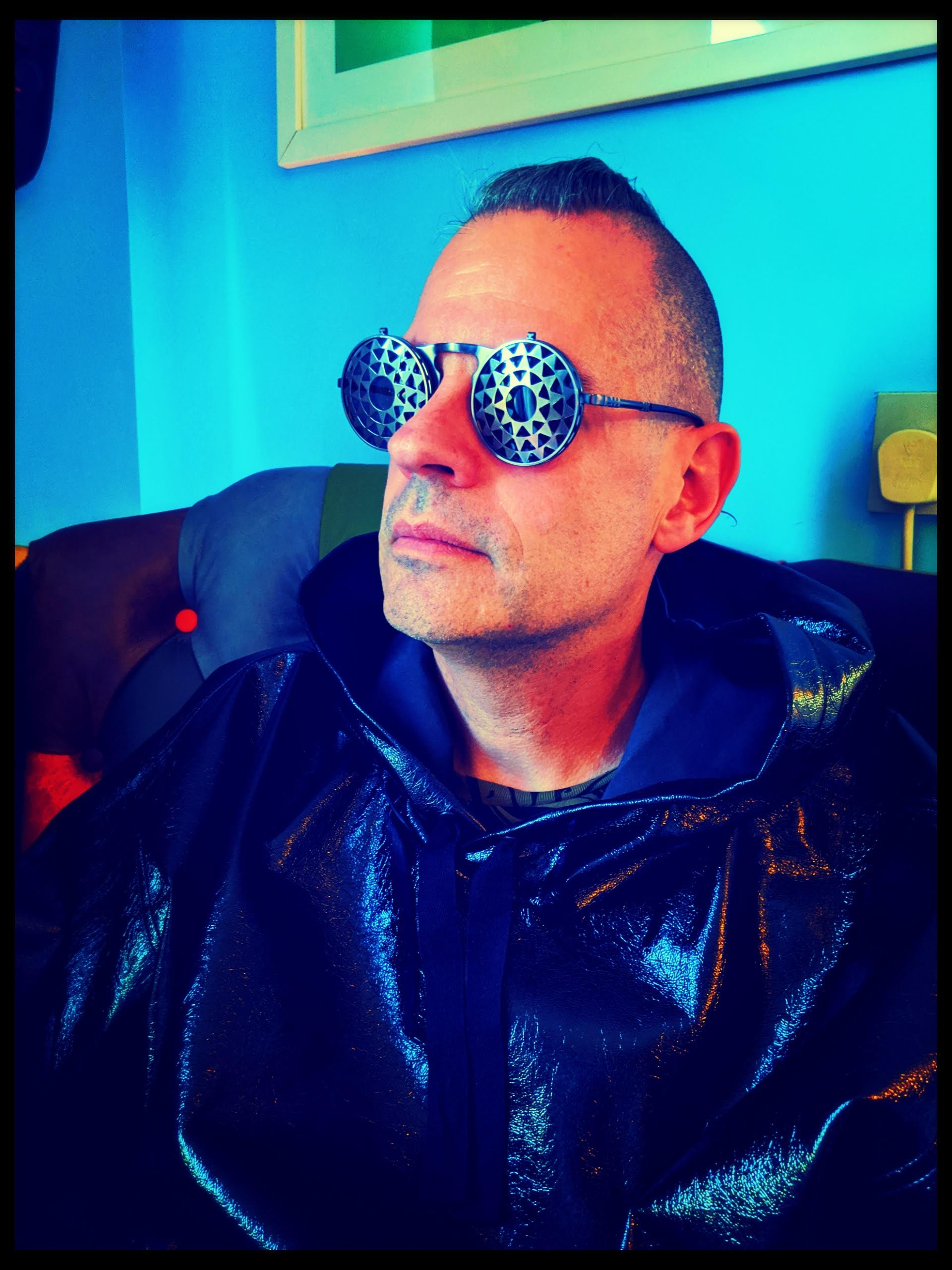
- Gordon in September 2020
- Born: 1964 (age 61–62); Portsmouth, England
- Occupations: Novelist, screenwriter, playwright, publisher, artist, art designer
- Website: www.johnrgordon.com

John R. Gordon (born 1964) is a British writer. His work – novels, plays, screenplays and biography - deals with the intersections of race, sexuality and class. With Rikki Beadle-Blair he founded and runs queer-of-colour-centric indie press Team Angelica. Although he was a "white person from a white suburb", according to Gordon, in the 1980s he became deeply interested in black cultural figures such as James Baldwin, Malcolm X and Frantz Fanon, and they have influenced his work ever since.

== Early work ==
Between 1993 and 2001, Gordon published three groundbreaking novels of Black gay British life, Black Butterflies, Skin Deep, and Warriors & Outlaws (the first two with Gay Men's Press, the third with Millivres/Prowler). In 1995, he directed his play Wheels of Steel, about a closeted young thug paralysed in a joyriding accident and his flamboyant male nurse, at the Gate Theatre, London. It starred Rikki Beadle-Blair and Karl Collins, who went on to play each other's estranged husbands in Beadle-Blair's Channel 4 series Metrosexuality. He wrote a 1999 sitcom pilot The Melting Pot, about a macho black British man (Felix Dexter) coming to terms with his long-lost Jamaican brother's homosexuality. Although it never made it beyond Channel 4's Sitcom Festival to television, The Independent praised it for offering innovative characters and situations. It also starred Terry Alderton.

== Noah's Arc ==
Gordon script-edited two seasons of Patrik-Ian Polk's television show Noah's Arc (2005–6) for the US cable channel Logo. He wrote two episodes of the second season (Desperado and Under Pressure), and across 2007 co-storylined (with Polk and Q. Allan Brocka) the spin-off feature-film, subsequently co-writing the screenplay with Polk. The film Noah's Arc: Jumping The Broom was given a limited release in six American cities, where it played to sold-out houses at the end of October 2008 and recouped $500,000 in ticket sales alone. The "Jumping The Broom" script that Gordon and Polk wrote was nominated for an NAACP Image Award, as was the film itself in the Best Independent Feature category. In April 2009, the film won the GLAAD Best (limited release) Feature Film Award.

In 2020, he co-executive produced Noah's Arc: The "Rona Chronicles", a reunion episode written and directed by Polk, and presented by Gilead Sciences on 5 July. It starred all original cast members and included a feature cameo by Wanda Sykes as Noah's mother, for which she was nominated for a 2021 Emmy for Outstanding Guest Performer in a Daytime Fiction Program. In January 2021, it was awarded a GLAAD Special Recognition Award.

A further standalone TV feature film, Noah's Arc: The Movie, reuniting the original cast, and for which Gordon co-storylined and executive produced, was first shown on the Paramount+ streaming channel on 20 June 2025.

== Souljah (short film) ==
His 10-minute short film Souljah – about a gay African former child soldier (B3/Angelica Entertainments 2007), and directed by Rikki Beadle-Blair – premiered at the London Film Festival on 30 October 2007. In July 2008 Souljah won the award for Best Short Film at the Rushes Soho Shorts Film Festival. April 2009 it won Best International Short at the Toronto Reelworld Film Festival. It was directed by Rikki Beadle-Blair for Team Angelica Productions and produced by Beadle-Blair, Gordon and Carleen Beadle.

== As publisher ==
In 2011, with Rikki Beadle-Blair he established the radical queer-of-colour-focused imprint Team Angelica Publishing. Its first book was Beadle-Blair's What I Learned Today. In 2013, they published the well-received and groundbreaking short-story collection Fairytales for Lost Children by gay Somali author Diriye Osman. On 8 October 2014, Fairytales for Lost Children won the Polari First Book Prize. In 2015, they published Roz Kaveney's novel, Tiny Pieces of Skull, which went on to win the 2016 Best Trans Fiction Lambda Literary Award. In November 2017, they published the first ever gay African memoir, Lives of Great Men by Chike Frankie Edozien. It was favourably reviewed in the London Financial Times and won the Best Gay Memoir/Non Fiction Lambda Literary Award in 2018. It went on to be republished by Jacana Books in South Africa, in July 2018, and by Ouida Books in Nigeria. In February 2018, they published Sista!, an anthology of writings by same-gender-loving women of African/Caribbean descent with a UK connection, edited by Gordon, Beadle-Blair and UK Black Pride co-founder Phyll Opoku-Gyimah; it included writers such as Yrsa Daley-Ward and was shortlisted for a 2019 Lambda Literary Award.

In 2020, he and Beadle-Blair contracted the gay African-American author Larry Duplechan to write a memoir of his love of film, Movies That Made Me Gay: it was published on 2 October 2023.

== Black and Gay in the UK: an anthology ==
Published on 20 October 2014, Black and Gay in the UK was co-edited with Rikki Beadle-Blair for their Team Angelica imprint. Its 352 pages of poems, memoirs, fictional stories and essays exploring the lives of black gay men with some connection to the United Kingdom includes writers, artists and activists such as Leee John, Travis Alabanza, Dean Atta, Adam Lowe, David McAlmont, Bisi Alimi, black British photographer Robert Taylor, Topher Campbell and Jide Macaulay.

== Other work ==
In 2009, Gordon co-wrote the screenplay for the short film Manali Cream (dir. Navdeep Kandola). In summer 2009, Gordon's one-act play Afro-Pik – a play about Black Man Hair, featuring Fisayo Akintunde was premiered at the Central School of Speech and Drama summer school. In summer 2010, Gordon's short play Work! premiered at Theatre503 as part of Golden Delilah's production, "7:1 Beyond Control".

Gordon was art designer on the feature films Fit, KickOff, Bashment, and the hour-long film Free (2014) (all Team Angelica productions).

In 2012–2017, Gordon and Beadle-Blair co-mentored Angelic Tales at the Theatre Royal Stratford East, a lengthy development project for new writers culminating in two-week-long seasons of staged readings on the theatre's main stage. Several of the plays they developed, such as Somalia Seaton's Crowning Glory (2013), Lynette Linton's Step (2013) and Alexis Gregory's Slap (2018) have gone on to full productions and/or tours. In 2017, he dramaturged Linton's exploration of mixed race British identity, Lightie, which played to sold-out audiences at the Arcola Theatre; the playtext was published by Team Angelica, as was the playtext of Slap.

Gordon was script consultant and associate producer on Patrik-Ian Polk's feature film Blackbird (2014) – a Tall Skinny Black Boy/Hicks Media co-production, written by Rikki Beadle-Blair and Polk, adapted from Larry Duplechan's novel of that name, and starring Mo'Nique and Isiah Washington.

== Faggamuffin (novel) ==
Gordon's fourth novel, Faggamuffin, was published in 2012. It is about a gay Jamaican reggae producer – Cutty, a character who first appeared in The Melting Pot – on the run from the authorities.

On 3 November 2015, a theatrical version of Faggamuffin, directed by Rikki Beadle-Blair and starring Nathan Clough, Marlon Kameka and Savannah Rae, was presented at the Bush Theatre as part of the Gay Buddies Week.

The novel inspired the formation in 2020 of the queer carnival activist group Faggamuffin Bloc Party.

== Souljah (novel) ==
On 22 September 2014, Gordon's sixth novel, Souljah, was published by Team Angelica. It is an extrapolation of characters and situations first presented in the award-winning short film of the same name. It was favourably reviewed by ka-os.blogspot.com: "this is a story that deserves everyone's attention. Souljah is truly breathtaking, in scale, and in ambition. I cried like a baby at times, and as events rapidly escalated in the novel's final act, I just couldn't put it down" and in the Huffington Post: "...a novel that defies categorization. It's a mashup of the immigrant saga, a chilling gangster thriller, a state-of-the-nation novel, a coming-of-age story and an intimate family portrait with a harrowing war crime at its heart. The fact that Gordon never once drops the ball makes Souljah a sprawling, visually arresting masterpiece." On 4 March 2015, it was shortlisted for a Lambda Literary Award.

== Yemi and Femi ==
Yemi and Femi are cartoon characters created by Gordon ("my lil' nephews"), British-Nigerian gay teen clubkid best friends, who first appeared in the graphic novella Yemi & Femi's Fun Night Out. Published in September 2015, it is a 42-page black-and-white graphic novella about Yemi and Femi and Femi's boyfriend Mixtape, and their adventures one night after being thrown out of a nightclub. The graphic novella explores issues around HIV, safe sex, PEP (post-exposure prophylaxis), PrEP (pre-exposure prophylaxis) and sero-discordancy in a comical way, in street-level language and urban slang. Gordon received an Arts Council grant to make copies available free to gay urban young people and sexual health charities.

On 28 April 2016, Gordon's short HIV-themed comedy play Yemi and Femi go da Chemist was premiered at Team Angelica's Boom! event as part of the AmBush at London's highly respected Bush Theatre, to an enthusiastic response from the sold-out audience. He and Beadle-Blair co-dramaturged the event, which showcased thirty-eight writers over two nights. The text of the play was included in the Team Angelica anthology, Black and Gay in the UK.

On 9 May 2023, Gordon's one-act play, Yemi & Femi Go Windrush, which sees the titular characters go back in time and encounter a gay Caribbean couple having a secret affair in 1950s Notting Hill, was presented as a staged reading as part of Tom Ratcliffe's Platform festival at the King's Head Theatre, dir. Rikki Beadle-Blair.

== Drapetomania (novel) ==
Published in May 2018, Drapetomania is a 500-page novel set in the American South. Ten years in the writing, it is an epic tale of black freedom, uprising, and a radical representation of romantic love between black men in slavery times. Patrik-Ian Polk has called it "an all-out masterpiece"; Michael Eric Dyson has hailed it as "a dazzling work of imagination"; and Audre Lorde biographer Alexis De Veaux described it as "a riveting, masterful work". It was favourably reviewed in the London Financial Times, which said it was "a damning indictment of America's racist history... often deeply moving and gripping". On 25 April 2019, it won the Publishing Triangle's prestigious Ferro-Grumley Award for best LGBTQ fiction.

== Hark (novel) ==
Hark, published in 2020, is a gay teen interracial romance set in a present-day extrapolation of the Southern Gothic landscape of Drapetomania. It contains a supernatural element exploring American's racially haunted past, and the turning of lynching photographs into postcards as souvenirs. Award-winning black gay fantasy writer Craig Laurance Gidney called it "audaciously provocative, sexy and spooky all at once. And very much of the zeitgeist"; Blackbird author Larry Duplechan described it as "a welcome addition to the tradition". It was listed as a Book of the Year by Books for Keeps.

== Mother of Serpents (novel) ==
Mother of Serpents, published in 2025, is a US-based weird tale in which a Black-white gay male couple and their mixed-race young son relocate from Brooklyn to all-white, rural Maine. There, stay-at-home dad DuVone, recovering from a mental health crisis, encounters increasingly uncanny and alarming phenomena. But are they real, or is he going mad again? Favourably reviewed in The Guardian, which said: "...something of the feel of classic Stephen King.... The fully realised, believable main characters exist in the real world, and the strong writing and specificity of detail make for a gripping read, with a genuinely original monster."

== A Curious World ==
With queer Rwandan performance artist Urban Wolf, in 2022 Gordon created a series of interlinked works, featuring the same cast of Black queer characters, set in "the endz" in South London: the 40-minute grime audio drama Scooters, Shooters & Shottas: a Curious tale (launched at Theatro Technis on 19 April) and a raucous 17-minute short film, Curious – both directed by Rikki Beadle-Blair, about a closeted rapper's quest for self-expression and liberation, also starring Dior Clarke and Curtis Brown. Scooters, Shooters & Shottas: a Curious tale was a finalist for the 2024 Tinniswood Award.

== Published works ==
- Black Butterflies (GMP, 1993), winner of a New London Writer's Award in 1994
- Skin Deep (GMP 1997)
- "Immigrant" (short story) in New Century, New Writing (ed. P P Hartnett, Millivres-Prowler, 2000)
- Warriors & Outlaws (Millivres/Prowler 2001).
- My Life in Porn: The Bobby Blake Story (Perseus Books, 2008, cowritten with Bobby Blake)
- Faggamuffin (Team Angelica Publishing, January 2012)
- "The Bridge" (short story) in Scarf magazine (June 2012)
- Colour Scheme (Team Angelica Publishing, January 2013)
- Souljah (Team Angelica Publishing, September 2014), Lambda Literary Award finalist 2015
- Black and Gay in the UK: an anthology (Team Angelica Publishing, October 2014) (co-editor, with Rikki Beadle-Blair, and contributor)
- Yemi & Femi's Fun Night Out: a graphic novella (Team Angelica Publishing, September 2015)
- "The Parasite That Grew Bigger Than The Animal" (short story) in Speak My Language (ed. Torsten Hojer, Robinson Books, November 2015)
- Drapetomania, or the Narrative of Cyrus Tyler & Abednego Tyler, lovers (Team Angelica Publishing, May 2018), winner Ferro-Grumley Award 2019; Lambda finalist
- Hark (Team Angelica Publishing, September 2020), Polari Prize longlisted
- Mother of Serpents (Team Angelica Publishing, February 2025)
