= Christian Vincent (actor) =

Canadian actor

- Occupations: Actor; dancer; choreographer; model
- Years active: 1998–present

Christian Vincent is an Emmy nominated Canadian-American professional dancer, choreographer, actor and model. His most notable roles are his appearances as Connor Martin in the Hallmark Christmas film," A Majestic Christmas," and as Ricky on the former LOGO Viacom television series Noah's Arc.

== Early life and education ==
While growing up in Windsor, Ontario, in grade school he attended Sandwich West Public School in LaSalle, Ontario. Vincent had several interests as a child, ranging from karate to painting and drawing. He later discovered his passion for dance and eventually enrolled at Butler University, where he graduated Cum Laude, with a BFA degree. He also earned an MFA, from The University of California, Irvine.

== Career ==
After college, Vincent later moved to Los Angeles to pursue a career as a dancer and choreographer. As a dancer, Vincent has toured and performed with Madonna, Ashanti, Gloria Estefan, Geri Halliwell, Prince, Ricky Martin, Shakira, and Britney Spears. Early on in his career he danced in various commercials including commercials for Bellsouth, as well as one for Oral-B. Christian was also a background dancer in Madonna's "Don't Tell Me" music video

Vincent danced in numerous films and TV show including, "Dancing with The Stars,"She's All That, Rent, Starsky & Hutch, Buffy the Vampire Slayer, Arrested Development, MADtv, George Lopez, Baywatch, Cold Case,and "G.I Joe Retaliation." Christian has choreographed and coached dance extensively for TV and film. He began professionally, when he choreographed several commercials for Target. Vincent was a co-star and choreographer for the reality TV show Canada Sings, and he was the dance coach for Sally Hawkins for Guillermo Del Toro's film The Shape of Water. Vincent choreographed Netflix's biopic of Madame C.J Walker, starring Octavia Spencer entitled "Self Made," in which he was nominated for a World Choreography Award. Christian also choreographed Lifetime's biopic on Salt-N-Pepa and The Christmas Dance Reunion. Most recently, Christian was nominated by the Television Academy for an Emmy Award. His work was recognized in the category of Outstanding Choreography for Scripted programming, for the CBC/BET series The Porter. This was a history-making nomination, as it was the first time year that BET received any major scripted series nominations.

As an actor, Vincent appeared in the ABC Family miniseries Fallen as Michael the Archangel, "Fringe," "Continuum," Smallville," Noah's Arc: Jumping the Broom," Center Stage: Turn It Up, "Noah's Arc," Hallmark's, "A Majestic Christmas," and most recently City TV's series "The Wedding Planners and the yet to be released "The Christmas Dance Reunion."

He also appeared in the October 2012 issue of PMc Magazine by celebrity photographer Patrick McMullan. In addition to his work in entertainment, Vincent is a professor at The Glorya Kaufman School of Dance at the University of Southern California.

== Personal life ==
Vincent lives in Los Angeles, California.

== Filmography ==
=== Film ===
Year	Title	Role	Notes
1999	She's All That	Dancer	Uncredited role
2000	Madonna: Don't Tell Me	Dancer	Video Short
2000	The Flintstones in Viva Rock Vegas	Dancer	Uncredited role
2002	Sex, Politics & Cocktails	Speed Dater	
2004	Starsky & Hutch	Nightclub Dancer	
2004	Noah's Arc: The Short Film	Ricky Davis	
2005	Rent	Dancer	Uncredited role
2005	Miss Congeniality 2: Armed & Fabulous	Drag Club Dancer	
2007	Walk Hard: The Dewey Cox Story	Dancer	Uncredited role
2008	Noah's Arc: Jumping the Broom	Ricky Davis	
2008	Center Stage: Turn It Up	Harris	
2009	500 Days of Summer	Dancer	
2009	Madonna: Celebration – The Video Collection	Dancer (video 'Don't Tell Me')	Video
2020	Noah's Arc: The 'Rona Chronicles	Ricky Davis	Short
2025	Noah's Arc: The Movie	Ricky Davis	

=== Television ===
Year	Title	Role	Notes
1998	Suddenly Susan	Dancer/Gentleman (uncredited)	Episode: "Seems Like Old Times"
1999	Tracey Takes On...	Male Dancer	Episode: "Hype"
1999	The Wonderful World of Disney	Male Dancer	Episode: "Annie"
2000–2001	Nikki	Dancer	Episodes: "No Sex, No Mary, No Title", "Family Lies"
2001	Buffy the Vampire Slayer	Vampire (uncredited)	Episode: "Once More, with Feeling"
2005	Arrested Development	Hot Cop (uncredited)	Episode: "Queen for a Day"
2005–2006	Noah's Arc	Ricky	Main cast (Seasons 1–2); 17 episodes
2006–2007	Smallville	Luthor Security Guard	Episodes: "Static", "Hydro"
2007	Fallen	Michael	Episode: "Someone Always Has to Die"
2009	Fringe	Surgeon	Episode: "A New Day in the Old Town"
2010	Sins of the Mother	Des	Television Film
2010	Caprica	Male Dancer	Episode: "Ghosts in the Machine"
2012	Canada Sings	Self/Choreographer	Episode: "OPP Project Glee vs. Cabin Pressure"
2013	Continuum	Dan	Episode: "Second Skin"
2017	Hidden America with Jonah Ray	Ritchie Cardenez	Episode: "Miami: Una Segunda Oportunidad En La Vida"
2018	A Majestic Christmas	Connor Martin	Television Film
2020	The Wedding Planners	Tyler	Episode: "A June Wedding"

== Emmy Awards ==
Year	Category	Nominated work	Result	Ref.
2022	Outstanding Choreography for Scripted Programming	The Porter	Nominated	
2026	Outstanding Choreography for Scripted Programming	Noah's Arc: The Movie	Pending	
