= Noah's Arc: Jumping the Broom =

- Theatrical release poster
- Directed by: Patrik-Ian Polk
- Written by: Patrik-Ian Polk; John R. Gordon
- Story by: Q. Allan Brocka
- Produced by: Patrik-Ian Polk
- Starring: Darryl Stephens; Christian Vincent; Doug Spearman; Rodney Chester; Jensen Atwood
- Cinematography: Christopher Porter
- Edited by: Phillip J. Bartell
- Music by: Adam S. Goldman; Julian Wass
- Production companies: New Open Door Productions; Blueprint Entertainment
- Distributed by: LOGO Films
- Release date: October 24, 2008 (US)
- Running time: 101 minutes
- Countries: United States; Canada
- Language: English
- Box office: $532,878

Noah's Arc: Jumping the Broom, is a 2008 American romantic comedy-drama film based on the LOGO television series Noah's Arc. It was released on October 24, 2008, in select theaters and video on demand.

The 2025 sequel Noah's Arc: The Movie premiered on Paramount+ in June 2025.

== Synopsis ==
Noah Nicholson (Darryl Stephens) and his ARC: Alex Kirby (Rodney Chester), Ricky Davis (Christian Vincent), and Chance Counter (Doug Spearman), retreat to Martha's Vineyard for Noah's intimate marriage to Wade Robinson (Jensen Atwood). While Alex's hubby, Trey (Gregory Kieth), video chats from home to babysit their newly adopted Ethiopian child, Chance brings his husband, Eddie (Jonathan Julian). Ricky is accompanied by the 19-year old Brandon (Gary LeRoi Gray), who is also Chance's student, for some lighthearted fling-dating. As the four couples hole up and attend separate bachelor parties, each relationship begins to unravel. Chance and his husband deal with unsettled problems within their marriage. Alex's energy pill-popping throughout the weekend, coupled with surprise drop-ins from Noah's boss Brandy (Jennia Fredrique) and rapper Baby Gat (Jason Steed), who is still interested in being in a relationship, does not help Noah and Wade work through last-minute jitters.

== Cast ==
- Darryl Stephens as Noah Nicholson-Robinson
- Christian Vincent as Ricky Davis
- Doug Spearman as Chance Counter-McIntyre
- Rodney Chester as Alex Kirby-Iverson
- Jensen Atwood as Wade Robinson
- Jonathan Julian as Eddie McIntyre
- Jason Steed as Baby Gat
- Tonya Pinkins as Mrs. Robinson
- Gary LeRoi Gray as Brandon
- Phoebe Snow as Herself
- Jennia Fredrique as Brandy King

== Production ==
According to creator Patrik-Ian Polk, who produced and directed the film and co-wrote with fellow series writer John R. Gordon, the feature film version of the series, Jumping the Broom, picks up after the series' second season cliffhanger finale and centers around the Martha's Vineyard wedding of the series' lead character Noah and his boyfriend Wade. The film was shot in Nova Scotia.

== Release ==
The film had a limited release in theaters located in Los Angeles, New York City, Atlanta, Chicago, Palm Springs, and Washington, D.C. On November 7, the film was released in Ocean City, New Jersey, Detroit, and San Francisco; and November 28 in Philadelphia and Dallas.

=== Critical response ===
Although much lauded in the gay press, Jumping the Broom has been met with generally mixed reception elsewhere. Time Out called it "ludicrous", whilst Variety described it as "a lame feature". Several critics felt that the leap from cable to big screen was too great. The film holds a 42% rating on Rotten Tomatoes.

=== Box office ===
The film surprised the entertainment industry by opening at number 1 on the independent film box office report, according to IndieWire (October 27, 2008). Theaters reported multiple sold-out screenings days in advance of the release and most added additional screenings to accommodate the overwhelming fan response. In fact, the film had an opening weekend per screen average of $30,336 and narrowly came second for top per screen average by the Clint Eastwood/Angelina Jolie film Changeling, which opened in limited release the same weekend and averaged $32,601. Theaters playing the film opening weekend reported by mid-December it had taken just over $532,000 at the US box office despite the film receiving little to no mainstream marketing support and never played on more than 7 screens at once during its 7-week theatrical run. By the end of its run, the film had grossed a domestic total of $532,878.

=== Accolades ===
The film received three NAACP Image Award nominations: Outstanding Independent Feature Film, Outstanding Writing in a Feature Film, and Outstanding Directing in a Feature Film. The film was also nominated for GLAAD Award's for Best Feature Film (Limited Release), in which it won.

== Soundtrack ==
The soundtrack was released on October 21, 2008, by Tommy Boy Records and features Michelle Williams, Bob Sinclar, Roy Young, and Phoebe Snow.

== Home media ==
The film was released February 3, 2009 on DVD.
