= Doug Spearman =

American actor

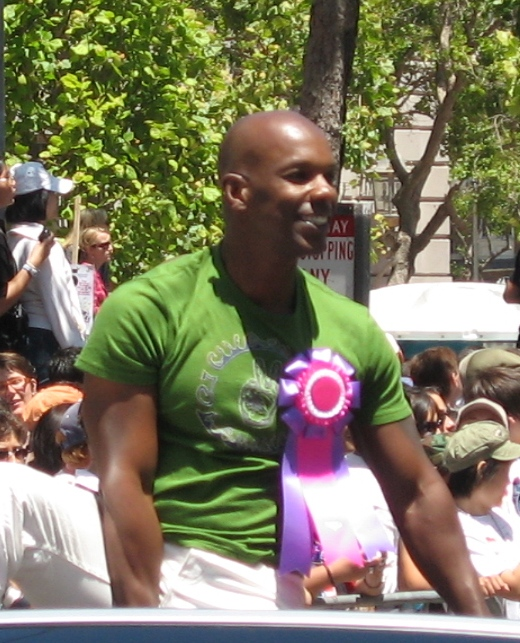
- Born: September 3, 1962 (age 64); Washington, D.C., U.S.

Doug Spearman (born September 3, 1962, in Washington, D.C.) is an American actor. His career highlights include work on such television shows as Noah's Arc, Star Trek: Voyager, The Drew Carey Show, The Hughleys, Charmed, Gideon's Crossing, MAD TV, Girlfriends and Profiler.

== Career ==
He has starred in such productions as the American premiere of the AIDS drama The Ice Pick, The Men's Room, Moscow, The Bullpen Boys, A Few Good Men, and the world premiere of South Coast Repertory's production of The Hollow Lands. Doug co-starred in the motion picture Cradle 2 the Grave with Jet Li and DMX and Any Day Now with Alan Cumming and Frances Fisher.

On television Spearman starred as Professor Chance Counter in the groundbreaking series Noah's Arc on LOGO and the feature film continuing the TV show's story, Noah's Arc: Jumping the Broom.

Spearman also worked as a writer/producer/director and creative director at ABC, CBS, NBC, UPN, Soapnet, BET, Logo TV, and E! Entertainment Television creating more than 2,000 television promos and multi-platform ad campaigns and marketing strategies in his career.

In 2006, Spearman created a television and film development and production company called The Ogden Group Entertainment. That year he also produced and directed his first documentary, "Aretha", on the life of the Queen of Soul, Aretha Franklin, which aired in January 2007. In 2009 the Directors Guild of America commissioned Doug to write a film entitled Pirates 3.0. The film was produced by Randal Kleiser and directed by Jeremy Kagan and shot entirely on the Warner Brothers lot.

He wrote and directed the feature films Hot Guys with Guns (2013) and From Zero to I Love You (2019).

== Awards ==
Spearman has been honored with many awards, including a Leadership Award from the Human Rights Campaign which was presented before the United States Senate; the Connie Norman Award from C.S.W. for outstanding achievement in fostering racial, ethnic, religious and gender unity within the LGBT community; The Advocacy Award from the National Education Association's LGBTQ+ Caucus; and an Image Award from the Jordan Rustin Coalition in Los Angeles.

== Personal life ==
Spearman grew up in Hyattsville, Maryland and attended Indiana University. Spearman is gay.

== Filmography ==
=== Film ===
Year	Title	Role
2004	Noah's Arc: The Short Film	Chance Counter-McIntyre
2008	Noah's Arc: Jumping the Broom	Chance Counter-McIntyre
2018	Trouble Is My Business	Officer Bradley
2020	Noah's Arc: The 'Rona Chronicles	Chance Counter-McIntyre
2022	Tall Girl 2	Fareeda's Dad
2023	We Have a Ghost	H&R Block client
2023	The Burial	Richard Mayfield
2025	Noah's Arc: The Movie	Chance Counter-McIntyre

=== Television ===
Year	Title	Role	Notes
1994	America's Most Wanted: America Fights Back	Shar-Ron Blue	1 episode
1995	Go Nagai's New Cutey Honey	Lead Hunter	voice role, English dub
1996	Dirty Pair Flash	Door guard	voice role, English dub
1996	Profiler	Prison guard	
1997	Star Trek: Voyager	Alien buyer	1 episode
1998	Charmed	Nurse	1 episode
2000	Girlfriends	Man #2	1 episode
2001	Gideon's Crossing	Visitor	1 episode
2001	The Hughleys	Gate Agent	1 episode
2005-2006	Noah's Arc	Chance Counter-McIntyre	main cast, 17 episodes
2013	Old Dogs & New Tricks	Neal Kelly	6 episodes
2017	Great News	Serious anchor	1 episode
2017	Law & Order True Crime	Male Juror #1	1 episode
2017	The Young and the Restless	Judge Hazen	1 episode
2020	GROUNDS: A Blackcast	Elijah Wright	voice role
2020	9 to 11 Minute Plays and Stores: Inspired by the Events of 9/11	Matthew	1 episode
2021	Boy Culture: Generation X	Trey	1 episode
2022	Leverage: Redemption	Fortescue	1 episode
2025	Found	Deacon Roland Brady	1 episode
