= Patrik-Ian Polk =

American film director

- Born: July 29, 1973 (age 53); Hattiesburg, Mississippi, United States
- Citizenship: American
- Education: University of Southern California
- Occupations: Director, screenwriter, producer
- Years active: 1990s–present

Patrik-Ian Polk (born July 29, 1973 in Hattiesburg, Mississippi) is an American director, screenwriter, and producer. Polk, who is gay, is noted for his films and theatre work that explore the experiences and stories of African-American LGBT people. In 2016, Polk was included in the Los Angeles Times Diverse 100 list, which described him as "the man bringing black gay stories to screens large and small".

Polk made his feature film directorial debut with Punks (2000), an independent film that he also wrote and produced. Punks had its world premiere at the Sundance Film Festival. In 2004, Polk created the television series Noah's Arc, which made its debut on Logo in October 2005 and ran for two seasons. After the series' cancellation, Polk wrote, directed, and produced a film spin-off, Noah's Arc: Jumping the Broom, which was released theatrically in 2008. His subsequent feature films, The Skinny, starring Jussie Smollett, and Blackbird, starring Mo'Nique, Julian Walker and Isaiah Washington, were released in 2012 and 2015, following festival runs.

== Early life and education ==
Born in 1973 in Hattiesburg, Mississippi, Polk was interested in television and movies as a child, notably Spike Lee's 1986 film She's Gotta Have It. He later attended Brandeis University, where he was the arts editor of the college newspaper. He received his undergraduate degree from the University of Southern Mississippi, then went on to study at the University of Southern California (USC) School of Cinema and Television.

== Career ==
"Polk has built for himself a full collection of work that was formative for a generation of Black gay men. [..] Through these works, as well as the work he still does, he allowed Black gay men to not only see versions of themselves but also provided them digestible venues for the pragmatic sex education that few others would provide"

— Mikelle Street of The Advocate on Polk's career (2020).

Polk made his feature film directorial debut with Punks (2000), an independent film that he also wrote and produced. The film starred Rockmond Dunbar, Renoly Santiago, Jazzmun, and Devon Odessa, and focused on the stories of a group of gay African-American friends. Punks premiered at the Sundance Film Festival. The film was chosen to open the San Francisco International Lesbian & Gay Film Festival. In November 2001, Punks was released theatrically at the Quad in New York City. It was nominated for the GLAAD Media Award and the Independent Spirit John Cassavetes Award in 2002. Punks later had its television premiere on Logo on August 7, 2011.

After Punks, Polk began developing a series concept that again focused on the lives of several gay African-American men. The original one-hour pilot was produced independently and released as a web series in 2004, and to assist in funding each episode, the show was originally envisioned as a DVD subscription series. After the web series was well received, the series was picked up by Logo as a half-hour series. The series focused on issues like same-sex dating, same-sex marriage, HIV and AIDS awareness, infidelity, promiscuity, homophobia, gay bashing, and same-sex parenthood. The series ultimately ran for two seasons on Logo before it was canceled in 2005.

Polk's second feature film, Noah's Arc: Jumping the Broom, a spin-off of Noah's Arc, was released in 2008. It was written in collaboration with fellow writer from the series John R. Gordon, and picks up after the cliffhanger at the end of the second season. The film focuses on the marriage and wedding of the main character, Noah Nicolson, and his boyfriend Wade Robinson at Martha's Vineyard. The film received three NAACP Image Award nominations: Outstanding Independent Feature Film, Outstanding Writing in a Feature Film, and Outstanding Directing in a Feature Film. It won GLAAD Award's for Best Feature Film (Limited Release). Noah's Arc: Jumping the Broom was released on October 24, 2008, on a limited basis, at theaters in Los Angeles, New York City, Atlanta, Chicago, Palm Springs, California, and Washington, D.C. The movie showed in Ocean City, New Jersey, Detroit and San Francisco in early November. The movie then began showing at theaters in Philadelphia and Dallas in at the end of November and performed above expectations, with $30,336 per screen average that IndieWire dubbed "astounding". Despite this, the film received poor reviews from mainstream film critics; Time Out called it a "silly soaper", and Variety described it as "a lame feature" that was "blandly staged". The New York Times called it an "agreeable melodrama".

In 2012, Polk released his third feature film, The Skinny, which he wrote, directed, and produced. The film tells the story of five friends who are Brown University classmates—four gay men and one lesbian—as they reunite in New York City for a tumultuous Gay Pride weekend. Following a festival run and limited theatrical release, the film premiered on Logo on July 8, 2012.

His third feature film as a writer and director, Blackbird, starring Mo'Nique and Isaiah Washington, was released in April 2015. Polk co-wrote the film with Rikki Beadle-Blair. The film had a successful run on the film festival circuit, winning awards at several LGBT-oriented festivals, including Outflix Memphis, Atlanta's Out On Film Festival, and the Crossroads Film Festival in Polk's native Mississippi. The film was the closing night gala screening for Los Angeles' Pan African Film Festival (PAFF), where it won the Founders Award for Best Narrative Feature Film. Blackbird received mixed reviews from critics upon release. The Hollywood Reporter called it "too all over the map to take seriously". The New York Times said that the film has an "impressive, palpable conviction", although it ultimately "suffers from soapy excesses and narrative disjunctures".

In 2017, Polk joined Being Mary Jane as a producer and writer. In 2020, he started co-producing the Starz show P-Valley.

== Personal life ==
Polk is openly gay, which has greatly influenced his work; in discussing his inspiration for the series Noah's Arc in an interview, Polk said: "I wanted to see black gay characters and there were none on TV. So I decided rather than complain about it, I'd do it myself." Polk lives in Harlem.

Polk has spoken out about lack of diversity in the entertainment industry, contrasting his struggle as a black gay man with his white, and also gay, counterparts:

The same year Punks premiered at Sundance, there was another film there by a white gay filmmaker called The Broken Hearts Club. The films are eerily similar except The Broken Hearts Club is a mostly white cast. Both films were well received, but [its director] Greg Berlanti — who is a friend of mine, very talented and this in no way is to take anything away from him — has gone on to become a premiere television producer. I'm not saying Greg is any more or less talented than I am.... What I am saying is doors were opened to Greg that just simply were not open to me; he was given access that I wasn't. Fifteen years in, I've had to carve out a career of independent work while a lot of my white gay counterparts and white straight counterparts [are] doing the kinds of things that I just simply have not even been given the opportunity to talk about doing.

== See also ==
- LGBT culture in New York City
- List of LGBT people from New York City
- NYC Pride March
