= Jensen Atwood =

American actor

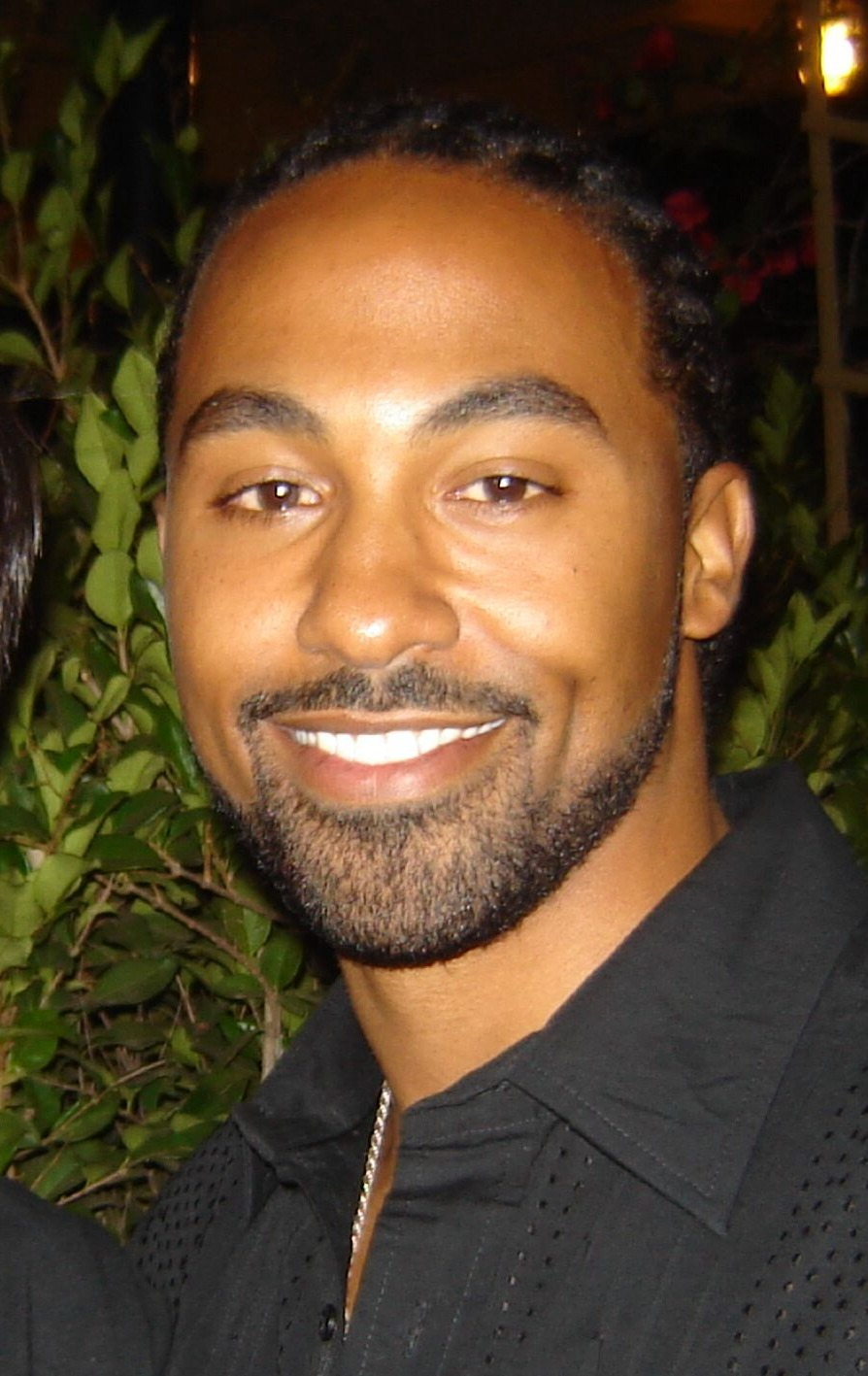
- Atwood in July 2007
- Born: August 25, 1976 (age 49); Los Angeles, California, U.S.
- Occupations: Actor, producer
- Years active: 1999–present

Jensen Atwood (born August 25, 1976) is an American actor from South Central, Los Angeles. Atwood is best known for roles in television productions such as Oprah Winfrey Presents: Their Eyes Were Watching God, Noah's Arc, and The Family Business: New Orleans.

== Early life ==
Atwood was born and raised in South Central, Los Angeles where he currently resides. He has two younger sisters Monica Jones and Ashley Atwood and two older brothers Gilbert (Andy) Atwood and Jason (String) Atwood. He studied acting at California State University, Long Beach, at Playhouse West in Los Angeles, and with Eric Morris.

== Career ==
Since beginning his show business career, Atwood has appeared in numerous music videos and stage productions. As a model, Atwood was featured on the cover of Krave, Bleu, and Ballroom Rockstar and appeared in a layout for Flaunt Magazine. He has appeared in advertisements for brands such as Walmart, Corona, Coors Light, KFC, K-Swiss, AT&T and has also sang backup for Tyrese.

In 2005 Atwood played Johnny Taylor, the love interest to Halle Berry in the ABC television film Oprah Winfrey Presents: Their Eyes Were Watching God. He played Wade Robinson in the Logo television series Noah's Arc The critically acclaimed Noah's Arc was the first TV series featuring Black gay men as main characters. In interviews, Atwood says that playing Wade was his most challenging role. He reprised the role of Wade in the show's 2008 spin-off film, Noah's Arc: Jumping the Broom in the 2025 sequel, Noah's Arc: The Movie. In 2007, Atwood joined the cast of Here TV's Dante's Cove in its third season, playing the role of Griffen, a mage.

== Filmography ==
Year	Title	Role	Notes
1999	The Parkers	Student	TV series
2005	Their Eyes Were Watching God	Johnny Taylor	Movie
2005–2006	Noah's Arc	Wade Robinson	TV series
2007	Dante's Cove	Griffen	TV series
2008	Noah's Arc: Jumping the Broom	Wade Robinson	Movie
2011	The Truth	Carter	Short Film
2015	Quiet As Kept	Charles	Movie
2016	Before 'I Do'	Caleb Abrams	Movie
2020	Noah's Arc: The 'Rona Chronicles	Wade Robinson	pandemic special
2021	Once Upon A Life Time	Joseph Conley	Movie
2021	Velvet Jesus	Carl	Movie
2023	Sisters	Trae	Movie
2025	The Family Business: New Orleans	Saint	
2025	Noah's Arc: The Movie	Wade Robinson	Movie

=== Music videos ===
Year	Music video	Artist
2001	"Superwoman Pt. II"	Lil' Mo
2003	"I Wish I Wasn't"	Heather Headley
2004	"Soldier"	Destiny's Child
2010	"Hands Tied"	Toni Braxton
2024	"Waiting"	Keke Palmer
