= Noah's Arc (TV series) =

Television show filmed in Vancouver

- DVD box cover
- Genre: Comedy drama
- Created by: Patrik-Ian Polk
- Starring: Darryl Stephens; Rodney Chester; Christian Vincent; Doug Spearman
- Opening theme: "Remember the Love" by Adriana Evans
- Country of origin: United States
- No. of seasons: 2
- No. of episodes: 17 (plus unaired pilot) (list of episodes)

Production
- Running time: 23 minutes

Original release
- Network: Logo
- Release: October 19, 2005 – October 4, 2006

Related
- Noah's Arc: Jumping the Broom; Noah's Arc: The Movie

Noah's Arc is an American cable television comedy-drama series that aired for two seasons on the Logo network from October 19, 2005 to October 4, 2006. The show centered on the lives of four African-American gay friends who share personal and professional experiences while living in Los Angeles.

The series was followed by the film Noah's Arc: Jumping the Broom (2008), the pandemic special Noah's Arc: The 'Rona Chronicles (2020), and the streaming television sequel Noah's Arc: The Movie (2025).

== Series overview ==
Originally, the show focused around friends Noah Nicholson, Alex Kirby, Ricky Davis, and Chance Counter. Noah is a financially struggling screenwriter who eventually lands a job as a Hollywood film writer, a job that originally belonged to his boyfriend Wade Robinson. Alex is an HIV counselor and the sassy friend of the group. Ricky is the owner of clothing boutique and the closest friend of Noah. Chance is a college professor. Wade, who eventually becomes Noah's boyfriend, struggles with his sexual identity as well as acceptance by Noah's friends. The group endures many social issues throughout the series including same sex dating, same-sex marriage, same-sex parenthood, HIV and AIDS awareness, infidelity, promiscuity, homophobia, and gay bashing.

By season two, Noah and Wade's intimate relationship ends with Noah having a new boyfriend and moving into new home. Alex opens his own HIV clinic with the help of his friends. Ricky enters into a brief relationship with a doctor who is HIV positive but Ricky has his reservations about being intimate. Chance is now a married man who is adapting to married life.

== Cast and characters ==
- Darryl Stephens as Noah Nicholson, a screenwriter
- Rodney Chester as Alex Kirby, an HIV/AIDS educator
- Christian Vincent as Ricky Davis, a promiscuous boutique owner
- Doug Spearman as Chance Counter, an economics professor
- Jensen Atwood as Wade Robinson, a screenwriter who comes out after falling for Noah

== Production ==
=== Development ===
Cast of Noah's Arc

Cast of seasons 1 and (2005–2006), from left: Gregory Keith, Christian Vincent, Jonathan Julian, Darryl Stephens, show creator Patrik-Ian Polk, Doug Spearman, Rodney Chester, Jensen Atwood

The idea for Noah's Arc originated in 2003 when Patrik-Ian Polk attended a Los Angeles Black gay pride club event. The experience inspired Polk to write the series that was centered around the lives of Black gay men. The original one-hour pilot was produced independently and released as a web series in 2004, and to assist in funding each episode, the show was originally envisioned as a DVD subscription series. After the web series was well received, the series was picked up by Logo TV as a half-hour series. During production of the pilot episode, Rodney Chester – who portrays Alex in the show – used his own truck as a makeshift hair, make-up and dressing room. After the pilot episode was well received at film festivals and independent screenings, the series was picked up by MTV-affiliated cable network Logo as a half-hour series. The pilot, "My One Temptation", was re-written and re-shot as a two-part premiere episode, and Noah's Arc became LOGO's first scripted series.

Executive producer Dave Mace served as the series' showrunner, with Patrik-Ian Polk and Carol Ann Shine as series' co-executive producers. Pamela Post, Noreen Halpern, Eileen Opatut, and John Morayniss also served as executive producers for the second season.

=== Casting ===
Casting for the lead characters of Noah's Arc occurred in early 2003. Pamela Azmi-Andrew was the casting director as Polk sat in on the auditions. For the title lead role, Noah Nicholson, actors Darryl Stephens and Christian Vincent were being considered. Stephens, who originally auditioned for the role of Ricky Davis, was cast as Noah Nicholson. Vincent was later recast as Noah's best friend Ricky Davis.

Rodney Chester was cast as Alex Kirby. Chester maintained a friendship with Polk when he appeared in Polk's independent film Punks, which adapts several elements into the television series. Doug Spearman and Jensen Atwood would later be cast for their respective roles. By mid-2003, a cast was put together for the filming of the pilot episode. Shortly after the release of the pilot episode, Polk wrote and directed another in-depth episode for the characters. Shaun T. Fitness, who was originally cast as Trey Iverson in the pilot episode, was replaced by Gregory Keith in the series. Carlos Tineco, who was originally cast as a random guy whom Ricky has sex with, was cast for the recurring role Junito. The character of Junito was originally a go-go dancer before being rewritten as a doctor and later recast with Wilson Cruz assuming the role in the series. Jurnee Crapps, who played the role of Kenya McEntire, was replaced by Sahara Davis in season two.

== Reunion ==
On July 5, 2020, nearly fourteen years after the show ended, the cast reunited for Noah's Arc: The 'Rona Chronicles, an hour-long special aired on YouTube and Facebook. Produced during and based around the COVID-19 pandemic, The 'Rona Chronicles was produced as a virtual reunion, with the actors (and therefore their characters) interacting virtually via Skype. The reunion, which benefited charity, was followed by a live Q&A moderated by Queer Eye's Karamo Brown.

== Legacy ==
Noah's Arc was the first scripted television series to center a group of black gay men.

== Episodes ==
Season one consists of nine episodes, while season two has eight episodes. The unaired pilot is available on the season one DVD box set. The series was subsequently continued in multiple feature specials.

Season	Episodes	Originally released	
Season	Episodes	First released	Last released
1	9	October 19, 2005	December 7, 2005
2	8	August 9, 2006	October 4, 2006
Noah's Arc: Jumping the Broom		October 24, 2008	
Noah's Arc: The 'Rona Chronicles		July 29, 2020	
Noah's Arc: The Movie		June 20, 2025	

=== Season 1 (2005) ===
No. overall	No. in season	Title	Directed by	Written by	Original release date
1	1	"My One Temptation: Part 1"	Patrik-Ian Polk	Patrik-Ian Polk	October 19, 2005
2	2	"My One Temptation: Part 2"	Patrik-Ian Polk	Patrik-Ian Polk	October 19, 2005
3	3	"Don't Mess with My Man"	Patrik-Ian Polk	Patrik-Ian Polk	October 26, 2005
4	4	"Don't Make Me Over"	Patrik-Ian Polk	Patrik-Ian Polk	November 2, 2005
5	5	"Nothin' Goin' on But the Rent"	Patrik-Ian Polk	Patrik-Ian Polk	November 9, 2005
6	6	"Writing to Reach You"	Patrik-Ian Polk	Patrik-Ian Polk	November 16, 2005
7	7	"Love Is a Battlefield"	Patrik-Ian Polk	Patrik-Ian Polk	November 23, 2005
8	8	"I'm with Stupid"	Patrik-Ian Polk	Patrik-Ian Polk	November 30, 2005
9	9	"Got 'til It's Gone"	Patrik-Ian Polk	Patrik-Ian Polk	December 7, 2005

=== Season 2 (2006) ===
No. overall	No. in season	Title	Directed by	Written by	Original release date
10	1	"Housequake"	Sheldon Larry	Patrik-Ian Polk	August 9, 2006
11	2	"It Ain't Over 'Til It's Over"	Sheldon Larry	Rikki Beadle Blair	August 16, 2006
12	3	"Desperado"	Mina Shum	John R. Gordon	August 23, 2006
13	4	"Excuses for Bad Behavior"	Mina Shum	Rikki Beadle Blair	August 30, 2006
14	5	"Give It Up"	Laurie Lynd	Patrik-Ian Polk	September 6, 2006
15	6	"Under Pressure"	Laurie Lynd	John R. Gordon	September 13, 2006
16	7	"Baby Can I Hold You"	Mina Shum	Patrik-Ian Polk	September 27, 2006
17	8	"Say It Loud"	Mina Shum	Patrik-Ian Polk	October 4, 2006

== Release ==
=== Broadcast ===
Noah's Arc aired on Logo in the United States. The show became Logo's highest-rated show during its run. Despite the positive feedback from viewership, the show was not renewed for a third season and was later canceled. In the summer of 2008, BET's spin-off cable television channel BET J briefly broadcast the entire series in rotation. In October 2008, the movie Noah's Arc: Jumping the Broom was released which picks up after series' cliffhanger finale.

=== Streaming ===
In March 2019, Logo TV began streaming the entire series on their YouTube channel. The episodes were removed from their YouTube channel in September 2019. The series streams on Apple TV (with a subscription). Outside of Logo platform, the series can be found on electronic sell-through platforms such as iTunes and Amazon Prime Video.

== Soundtracks ==
Soundtrack albums for each of the first two seasons were released by Tommy Boy Records. The season one soundtrack was released on March 24, 2006, and features music by such artists as Joshua Radin, Gordon Chambers, Me'shell Ndegéocello, Patrik-Ian Polk, Mary Ann Tatum, and Adriana Evans.

The soundtrack for season two was released on December 15, 2007, featuring the likes of Anthony David, Bedroom Walls, Raz-B, Patrik-Ian Polk, Mike Anthony, and Solange Knowles.

== See also ==
- Noah's Arc: Jumping the Broom
- Noah's Arc: The Movie
