= List of LGBTQ characters in radio and podcasts =

This is a list of LGBTQ characters in radio and podcast programs. Podcasts are similar to radio programs in form, but they exist as audio files that can be played at a listener's convenience, anytime or anywhere.

The orientation can be described in the dialogue or otherwise mentioned. Roles include lead, main, recurring, supporting, and guest.

The names are organized alphabetically by surname (i.e. last name), or by single name if the character does not have a surname.

== List ==
Character	Portrayed by	Program	Identity	Notes
Raimy Armstead	L. Jeffrey Moore	The White Vault	Gay	In season 4 Raimy battles the Patagonia site to rescue his partner Simon Hall. (2020–2022)
Oliver Banks	Russell Smith	The Magnus Archives	Unknown, attracted to men.	Discusses a past relationship with another man named Graham. (2016-2021)
Georgie Barker	Sasha Sienna	The Magnus Archives	Unknown, attracted to men and women.	Is shown to date men and eventually becomes romantically involved with a woman. (2016–2021)
Martin Blackwood	Alex J. Newell	The Magnus Archives	Unknown, attracted to men.	Enters into a relationship with a man. (2016-2021)
Ray Bourbon	Hal Wadell	Boys Will Be Girls	Gay	Ray Bourbon was the stage name of an American female impersonator. In 1933, a San Francisco radio station was broadcasting live his gay drag revue, Boys Will Be Girls, at Tait's Cafe. Listeners heard the police raiding the cafe to shut down his illegal "pansy show". (1933)
Mark Bryant	Andrew Nowak	The Bright Sessions	Bisexual	Uses the term bisexual, shows romantic interest in both male and female. Went with a guy to prom. (2015–2018)
Cliodhna Byrne	Leah Minto	Within the Wires	Lesbian	Often references relationship with girlfriend Siobhan (2021)
Carlos (the Scientist)	Dylan Marron	Welcome to Night Vale	Gay	Carlos is the boyfriend, later husband, of Cecil Palmer. (2012–Present)
Ian Craig	Stephen Kennedy	The Archers	Gay	Chef at Grey Gables and is married to Adam Macy. (1951–Present)
Josh Crayton	Joseph Fink	Welcome to Night Vale	Queer	Josh is mentioned to be dating a boy named Grant in episode 106, and has a crush on a boy named Monty in episode 151. (2017–present)
Georgie Crusoe	Ciara Baxendale	Wooden Overcoats	Bisexual	Georgie has dated men and is also in a relationship with Jennifer Delacroix.(2015-2022)
Taryon Darrington	Sam Riegel	Critical Role	Gay	Marries his former tutor, Lawrence. (2015–Present)
Alice Dyer	Billie Hindle	The Magnus Protocol	Transgender	Originally confirmed by creator Alexander J. Newall. Alice also alludes to receiving hate mail for being an openly trans woman.
Carey Fangbattle	Griffin McElroy	The Adventure Zone	Lesbian	Carey is married to Killian. (2014–2019)
Shaun Gilmore	Matthew Mercer	Critical Role	Gay	Owner of Gilmore's Glorious Goods and sponsor of Vox Machina. (2015–Present)
Hercules Grytpype-Thynne	Peter Sellers	The Goon Show	Gay	Grytpype-Thynne is the smooth spoken and sophisticated principal villain on the show, and is usually accompanied by his companion in crime, Count Jim Moriarty. Grytpype-Thynne's relationship with Moriarty also goes downhill in later series; he often refers to Moriarty insultingly. (1951–1960)
Simon Hall	Eric Nelsen	The White Vault	Gay	Is in a relationship with Raimy Armstead. (2019–2022)
Adam Hayes	Alex Gallner	The Bright Sessions	Gay	Adam is in a relationship with Caleb Michaels; the couple met in high school (2015–2021)
Hurley	Griffin McElroy	The Adventure Zone	Lesbian	The lover of Sloane. (2014–2019)
Iaus Innskeep	David Ault	Dark Dice	Gay	A roguish innkeeper who dated the town's Mayor, Delvin Brighthope, and regularly flirts with Soren while searching for his son. Iaus then goes on a series of speed dates while learning about the LGBT+ community in his community. (2018–Present)
J'mon Sa Ord (Devo'ssa)	Matthew Mercer	Critical Role	Non-binary	The ruler of the city of Ank'Harel. Uses they/them pronouns. (2015–Present)
Cecil Kanagawa	Leslie Drescher	The Penumbra Podcast	Transgender	A dramatic media star. Although not explicitly trans as the concept doesn't exist in Hyperion City, he isn't cis as stated by the creator. (2016–present)
Kevin	Kevin R. Free	Welcome to Night Vale	Gay	Cecil's Desert Bluffs counterpart. Is dating Charles the Theologist (Carlos the Scientist's Desert Bluffs counterpart) as of episode 135. (2013–present)
Killian	Griffin McElroy	The Adventure Zone	Bisexual	Married Carey Fangbattle in the finale of the Balance arc. (2014–2019)
Kima of Vord	Matthew Mercer	Critical Role	Lesbian	Marries Allura Vysoren. (2015–Present)
Melanie King	Lydia Nicholas	The Magnus Archives	Unknown, attracted to women	Enters a relationship with Georgie Barker. (2016–2021)
Kravitz	Griffin McElroy	The Adventure Zone, The Zone of Adventure: Imbalance	Queer	In a romantic relationship with Taako.(2014–2019, 2021)
Beauregard Lionett	Marisha Ray	Critical Role	Lesbian	Has dated or expressed interest in multiple women, currently dating Yasha. (2015–Present)
Adam Macy	Andrew Wincott	The Archers	Gay	Married to Ian Craig and works as a farmer at Home Farm. (1951–Present)
Sir Fitzroy Maplecourt	Griffin McElroy	The Adventure Zone: Graduation	Asexual	Fitzroy is portrayed by Griffin McElroy, who said in a Q&A episode that he thinks of Fitzroy as asexual. (2019–2021)
Intern Maureen	Maureen Johnson	Welcome to Night Vale	Lesbian	Maureen tells Cecil in episode 80 that she “doesn’t even like boys”, and is confirmed to be dating Michelle Nguyen in episode 130. (2014–present)
Caleb Michaels	Briggon Snow	The Bright Sessions	Queer	Caleb is in a relationship with Adam Hayes; the couple met in high school (2015–2021)
Michelle Nguyen	Kate Jones	Welcome to Night Vale	Lesbian or bisexual	Michelle is confirmed to be in a romantic relationship with former intern Maureen as of episode 130. (2014–present)
Yasha Nydoorin	Ashley Johnson	Critical Role	Lesbian	Was married to a woman in her tribe, currently dating Beau. (2017–Present)
Cecil Gershwin Palmer	Cecil Baldwin	Welcome to Night Vale	Gay	Cecil is a gay radio host who develops a crush on Carlos (the scientist) later becoming his boyfriend, and then husband. (2012–Present)
Russell Paxton	Keene Crockett	Theatre Guild on the Air	Gay	The musical Lady in the Dark adapted for radio. Russell is an openly gay fashion photographer.
Jude Perry	Hannah Walker	The Magnus Archives	Lesbian	Discusses a past girlfriend, and later fell in love with Agnes Montague. (2016-2021)
Sheriff Sam	Emma Frankland	Welcome to Night Vale	Non-binary	The new sheriff of Night Vale, Sam is consistently referred to exclusively with they/them pronouns. (2015–present)
Jet Siquliak	Alexander Stravinski	The Penumbra Podcast	Aromantic, asexual	Discusses how he is not romantically or sexually attracted to anyone. (2016-2024)
The Archivist	Jonathan Sims	The Magnus Archives	Biromantic, asexual	Implied to be asexual in episode 106 and confirmed to be in the season 3 Q+A. Implied to be biromantic, as he was stated to have dated a woman in the past and began dating a man in the series. (2016–2021)
Sloane	Griffin McElroy	The Adventure Zone	Lesbian	She is in love with a woman named Hurley. (2014–2019)
Juno Steel	Joshua Ilon	The Penumbra Podcast	Bisexual, Non-binary	Juno is a bisexual private eye who falls in love with notorious thief Peter Nureyev. (2016–2024)
Peter Nureyev	Noah Simes	The Penumbra Podcast	Gay	Nureyev is a notorious thief who falls in love with bisexual private eye, Juno Steel. (2016–2024)
Timothy "Tim" Stoker	Mike LeBeau	The Magnus Archives	Bisexual	Is stated by Jonathan Sims to have courted both men and women. (2016-2021)
Lup Taaco	Griffin McElroy	The Adventure Zone	Trans woman	Twin sister of one of the protagonists, Taako. (2014–2019)
Taako Taaco	Justin McElroy	The Adventure Zone, The Zone of Adventure: Imbalance	Gay	In a romantic relationship with Kravitz. (2014–2019, 2021)
Keisha Taylor	Jasika Nicole	Alice Isn't Dead	Lesbian or bisexual	Married to Alice. (2017–Present)
Clarence Tiffingtuffer	Ray Hedge	Myrt and Marge	Gay	Clarence is a young costume designer who is a close friend to the title characters. The show had radio's first gay character. (1937–1946)
Chloe Turner	Anna Lore	The Bright Sessions	Panromantic, asexual	Chloe, one of the show's main characters is a panromantic asexual. (2015–2018)
Allura Vysoren	Matthew Mercer	Critical Role	Lesbian or bisexual	Marries Lady Kima. (2015–Present)
Hester Wells	Janina Matthewson	Within the Wires	Lesbian	Marries Oleta (2016–Present)

== See also ==
- Lists of LGBT figures in fiction and myth
- List of lesbian characters in television
- List of gay characters in television
- List of bisexual characters in television
- List of transgender characters in television
- List of comedy television series with LGBT characters
- List of dramatic television series with LGBT characters: 1960s–2000s
- List of dramatic television series with LGBT characters: 2010–2015
- List of dramatic television series with LGBT characters: 2016–2019
- List of dramatic television series with LGBT characters: 2020s
- List of made-for-television films with LGBT characters
- List of LGBT characters in soap operas
- List of reality television programs with LGBT cast members
