= List of dramatic television series with LGBTQ characters: 1960s–2000s =

This is a list of dramatic television series (including web television and miniseries) that premiered in the 1960s–2000s which feature lesbian, gay, bisexual, and transgender characters. Non-binary, pansexual, asexual, and graysexual characters are also included. The orientation can be portrayed on-screen, described in the dialogue or mentioned.

== 1960s ==
Show	Network	Character	Actor	Notes	Year
The Asphalt Jungle	ABC	Miss Brant	Virginia Christine	Miss Brant is a repressed lesbian, and serial killer who kills girls who give themselves up to boys. Broadcast in 1961. The show was inspired by the 1950 film The Asphalt Jungle.	1961
The Eleventh Hour	NBC	Hallie Lambert	Kathryn Hays	Dr. Starke (Ralph Bellamy) treats Hallie, a lesbian and an unstable actress, who has fallen in love with the female director of the play she is appearing in.	1962–1964
The Alfred Hitchcock Hour	NBC	Nurse Betty Ames	T. C. Jones	Nurse Ames is a transvestite serial killer who preys specifically on nurses, in episode "An Unlocked Window". Broadcast in 1965.	1962–1965
The Bold Ones: The Lawyers	NBC	Barry Goram	Morgan Sterne	Barry is gay, and worked for Gubernatorial candidate Stephen Patterson (Craig Stevens). When Stevens discovers that Barry is gay, he forces him to resign to avoid a scandal. Barry gets revenge by framing Patterson for murder.	1968–1972
The Bold Ones: The New Doctors	NBC	Jack Melino	Robert Hogan	Fourteen year old Cory Melino (Ron Howard) discovers that his divorced father Jack is gay, when he makes a surprise visit to his house. Jane Wyman has a guest role as Dr. Amanda Fallon, who scolds the mother and grandfather (Jim Davis) for hiding this information from Cory, in episode "Discovery at Fourteen"	1969–1973
The Bold Ones: The New Doctors	NBC	Valerie DeMarco	Donna Mills	Valerie and Eleanor are in a lesbian relationship. Valerie is a nurse, while Eleanor is earning her degree in clinical psychology.	1969–1973
The Bold Ones: The New Doctors	NBC	Eleanor	Hildy Brooks	Valerie and Eleanor are in a lesbian relationship. Valerie is a nurse, while Eleanor is earning her degree in clinical psychology.	1969–1973
Medical Center	CBS	Dr. Annie Claymore	Lois Nettleton	Dr. Claymore is a lesbian and a psychiatrist called in to handle a heart patient, Tobi, who is not taking her medicine. Tobi's boyfriend believes that Dr. Claymore is out to convert his girlfriend, in episode "Impasse". In his book Alternate Channels, author Steven Capsuto cites Annie Claymore as "American TV's first productive, happy lesbian character."	1969–1976
Medical Center	CBS	Dr. Ben Teverly	Paul Burke	A gay research scientist becomes the target of a smear campaign. Dr. Gannon (Chad Everett) defends Teverly against the smears, by reminding his colleagues that "it was a homosexual who painted the ceilings" of the Sistine Chapel.	1969–1976
N.Y.P.D.	ABC	Bert Gaffer	James Broderick	Bert is a closeted construction worker, who agrees to cooperate with the police to catch a gang of blackmailers who are robbing and targeting homosexuals, with threats to out them unless they pay money to them.	1967–1969
N.Y.P.D.	ABC	Charles Spad	John Harkins	Charles is an openly gay businessman and activist, who also agrees to help the police with the gang of blackmailers. When he is initially asked to help, Spad makes it clear to them that "just because I'm a homosexual...doesn't mean I know every other one in the country".	1967–1969
The Wednesday Play	BBC One	Robin Fletcher	Nicol Williamson	A cosmopolitan London couple, Peter and Cathy Young (Alfred Lynch and Glenda Jackson), find their outwardly charmed lives upended by Robin, a troubled homosexual friend. Broadcast in 1965.	1964–1970

== 1970s ==
Show	Network	Character	Actor	Notes	Year
Angels	BBC	Ken Hastings	Michael Howarth	Ken is gay and fighting to save the hospital from closing. Paul is his lover.	1975–1983
Angels	BBC	Paul	Michael Troughton	Ken is gay and fighting to save the hospital from closing. Paul is his lover.	1975–1983
Baretta	ABC	Tommy Rankin	Barry Miller	Tommy is a 14-year-old gay street hustler, who witnesses the murder of his friend. Baretta befriends him and investigates the murder.	1975–1978
The Baxters	Syndication	Gay teacher	actor unknown	Fred Baxter (Larry Keith) learns that one of Jonah's (Chris Petersen) teachers is gay. Homophobic neighbor Jerry Johnson (Chuck McCann) circulates a petition demanding that the teacher be fired.	1979–1981
Bronk	CBS	Sara Mitchell	Julie Sommars	Sara is the first female officer assigned to patrol duty in Bronk's (Jack Palance) department. Sara is accused of being a lesbian after an arrest of a female. The series was created by Carroll O'Connor, who was also the executive producer.	1975–1976
Days of Our Lives	NBC	Sharon Duval	Sally Stark	Sally is a housewife who realizes she is bisexual and in love with a female friend.	1976–1977
Executive Suite	CBS	Julie Solkin	Geraldine Brooks	Julie is in an abusive marriage with her husband, and comes out as lesbian to her best friend Leona (Patricia Smith). Leona responds to Julie that she likes her too, and then feeling upset about this, walks into traffic with Julie right behind her. Consequently, Julie is hit by a truck and dies.	1976–1977
Family	ABC	Flora Jessup	Blair Brown	Miss Jessup is a lesbian teacher who gets Buddy (Kristy McNichol) interested in reading. Stacey (Helen Hunt) bullies Buddy for being a teacher's pet. Stacey's mother (Joyce Van Patten) outs her at a school board meeting and tries to get her fired, but nobody cares because Miss Jessup is the best teacher anybody has ever had.	1976–1980
Lou Grant	CBS	Mike Tynan	Joe Penny	Mike is a gay detective that investigates a fire at a gay bar.	1977–1982
M*A*S*H	CBS	George	Richard Ely	George is a patient in the hospital with bruises from a beating. He explains to Hawkeye that the soldiers in his unit beat him up for being a homosexual.	1972-1983
Owen Marshall, Counselor at Law	ABC	Meg Dayton	Kristina Holland	Meg writes for a lesbian newspaper, and is the ex-roommate of Ann Glover (Meredith Baxter), a collegiate diving superstar. When Ann is accused of trying to seduce a 15-year-old student, Meg testifies on her behalf. It turns out that her accuser was in such a panic over her own feelings for Ann, she lied about Ann, in episode "Words of Summer". Meg was the first young adult character to state unequivocally that she was a lesbian on a TV drama. The character of Ann was inspired by Babe Didrikson Zaharias.	1971–1974
Play for Today	BBC One	Lewis Duncan	Anton Rodgers	Lewis is a gay writer of romantic novels, and Richie is his young on-off boyfriend. Lewis writes an article on gay issues under the pseudonym of "Zippy Grimes", and the article is a great success. Several fans write letters in support and when he meets some of these fans, he is forced to come out. Broadcast in 1979.	1970–1984
Play for Today	BBC One	Richie	Nigel Havers	Lewis is a gay writer of romantic novels, and Richie is his young on-off boyfriend. Lewis writes an article on gay issues under the pseudonym of "Zippy Grimes", and the article is a great success. Several fans write letters in support and when he meets some of these fans, he is forced to come out. Broadcast in 1979.	1970–1984
Play for Today	BBC One	Kim	Jane Lapotaire	Kim is a motorbike-riding artist, who seduces seventeen-year-old debutante Niki, into a brief lesbian relationship. Broadcast in 1976.	1970–1984
Play for Today	BBC One	Niki	Lynne Frederick	Kim is a motorbike-riding artist, who seduces seventeen-year-old debutante Niki, into a brief lesbian relationship. Broadcast in 1976.	1970–1984
Play for Today	BBC One	Stephen Piper / Susan	Paul Henley	Stephen is a young, pre-transition bank clerk. She is bullied and belittled by her volatile mother (Sylvia Kay), a teenage girl-next-door, and a homophobic colleague. Susan is British TV drama's first transgender lead character. Broadcast in 1979.	1970–1984
Police Woman	NBC	Mame	Fay Spain	A trio of lesbians are stealing from and killing off residents in a nursing home. Pepper (Angie Dickinson) goes undercover as a nurse to expose the killing-and-stealing scheme, in episode "Flowers of Evil".	1974–1978
Police Woman	NBC	Janet	Lynn Loring	A trio of lesbians are stealing from and killing off residents in a nursing home. Pepper (Angie Dickinson) goes undercover as a nurse to expose the killing-and-stealing scheme, in episode "Flowers of Evil".	1974–1978
Police Woman	NBC	Gladys	Laraine Stephens	A trio of lesbians are stealing from and killing off residents in a nursing home. Pepper (Angie Dickinson) goes undercover as a nurse to expose the killing-and-stealing scheme, in episode "Flowers of Evil".	1974–1978
Police Woman	NBC	Marlena	Patricia Crowley	Marlena is a lesbian and a successful business executive, she was Pepper's roommate in college. Marlena is called on to testify on Pepper's behalf when she is accused of sexually molesting a female suspect, in episode "Trial by Prejudice".	1974–1978
Prisoner	Network Ten	Franky Doyle	Carol Burns	Franky is a nicotine-stained lesbian biker who was imprisoned for armed robbery and murder and sentenced to life imprisonment.	1979–1986
Prisoner	Network Ten	Sharon Gilmour	Margot Knight	Sharon is Judy's lover and a scheming, spoiled young woman who is imprisoned for drug dealing.	1979–1986
Prisoner	Network Ten	Judy Bryant	Betty Bobbitt	Judy is an American ex-pat lesbian who deliberately committed a crime to join her lover Sharon in prison.	1979–1986
Prisoner	Network Ten	Joan Ferguson	Maggie Kirkpatrick	Joan is a sinister and cold lesbian prison officer known to the prisoners as "the Freak".	1979–1986
Prisoner	Network Ten	Terri Malone	Margot Knight	Terri is a bisexual young officer who temporarily became Joan Ferguson's live-in lover. The actor Margot Knight played two characters in this series, inmate Sharon Gilmour in 1980 and prison officer Terri Malone in 1985.	1979–1986
Second City Firsts	BBC Two	Jackie	Alison Steadman	Jackie and Chrissie, two officers in the Women's Royal Army Corps, are in a lesbian relationship. The 1974 episode "Girl", featured the first lesbian kiss on British television.	1973–1978
Second City Firsts	BBC Two	Chrissie	Myra Frances	Jackie and Chrissie, two officers in the Women's Royal Army Corps, are in a lesbian relationship. The 1974 episode "Girl", featured the first lesbian kiss on British television.	1973–1978
The Streets of San Francisco	ABC	Jackie Collins	Devon Ericson	Jackie and Tina are a lesbian couple. Jackie murders Tina's best friend out of jealousy. Jackie explains to Tina that the knife just slipped.	1972–1977
The Streets of San Francisco	ABC	Tina Harrington	Joanne Nail	Jackie and Tina are a lesbian couple. Jackie murders Tina's best friend out of jealousy. Jackie explains to Tina that the knife just slipped.	1972–1977
Tatort	ARD	Robert Karow	Mark Waschke	Robert is the first openly bisexual detective.	1971–
Tatort	ARD	Liz Ritschard	Delia Mayer	Liz is lesbian.	1971–
Tatort	ARD	Julia Grosz	Franziska Weisz	Julia is either lesbian or bisexual.	1971–
Tatort	ARD	Linda Selb	Luise Wolfram	Linda Selb is bisexual.	1971–
Upstairs, Downstairs	BBC	Alfred Harris	George Innes	Alfred leaves Eaton Place to work as a footman for his lover, Baron Klaus von Rimmer, after their affair is discovered. In the third season, Alfred returns to Eaton Place seeking refuge after he murdered Von Rimmer.	1971-1975
Upstairs, Downstairs	BBC	Baron Klaus von Rimmer	Horst Janson	Alfred leaves Eaton Place to work as a footman for his lover, Baron Klaus von Rimmer, after their affair is discovered. In the third season, Alfred returns to Eaton Place seeking refuge after he murdered Von Rimmer.	1971-1975

== 1980s ==
Show	Network	Character	Actor	Notes	Year
All My Children	ABC	Dr. Lynn Carson	Donna Pescow	Donna Pescow had a recurring role as lesbian doctor, Dr. Lynn Carson, who worked at Pine Valley Hospital.	1983
As the World Turns	CBS	Hank Elliot	Brian Starcher	Hank was the openly gay designer who worked for Barbara Ryan (Colleen Zenk) but made the decision to leave the town to care for his lover, Charles, who was dying of AIDS.	1988-1989
Bare Essence	NBC	Robert Spencer	Ted LePlat	Robert is gay, and Larry, a professional football player was his lover.	1982–1983
Bare Essence	NBC	Larry DeVito	Morgan Stevens	Robert is gay, and Larry, a professional football player was his lover.	1982–1983
Cagney & Lacey	CBS	Tony Stantinopolis	Barry Sattels	Tony moves in next door to Cagney in the episode, "Rites of Passage" and the two become fast friends. He was a recurring character for the last two seasons of the show.	1986-1988
CBS Schoolbreak Special	CBS	Todd Bowers	Richard Joseph Paul	In the episode "What If I'm Gay?", Todd comes out after his friends find a gay magazine in his desk. Todd confronts his friend Kirk (Manfred Melcher) about his homophobia, which may be rooted in his own anxiety about his sexual orientation, because of the sexual experimentation he and Todd engaged in when younger.	1984–1996
Celebrity	NBC	Mack Crawford	Joseph Bottoms	This 1984 miniseries' storyline includes the murder of a closeted gay movie star.	1984
Dress Gray	NBC	David Hand	Patrick Cassidy	David Hand is a gay cadet at the fictional Ulysses S. Grant Military Academy. David is raped and murdered and the prime suspect is Ry Slaight (Alec Baldwin). To clear his name, Ry initiates his own investigation and discovers that Cadet Winant (Joseph Kell), is the actual murderer.	1986
Dynasty	ABC	Steven Carrington	Al Corley (left after season 2)	Self-identifies as homosexual. He is among the earliest gay main characters included in an American television series. When Coleman took over the role, his change in appearance was explained by plastic surgery due to an oil rig explosion.	1981–1989
Dynasty	ABC	Steven Carrington	Jack Coleman (started in season 3)	Self-identifies as homosexual. He is among the earliest gay main characters included in an American television series. When Coleman took over the role, his change in appearance was explained by plastic surgery due to an oil rig explosion.	1981–1989
Dynasty	ABC	Ted Dinard	Mark Withers	Steven Carrington's former boyfriend from New York City.	1981–1989
Dynasty	ABC	Luke Fuller	Billy Campbell	Has a relationship with Steven Carrington. Luke was killed in the "Moldavian Massacre".	1981–1989
Dynasty	ABC	Chris Deegan	Grant Goodeve	Chris is Steven's gay lawyer, and lived with him platonically for a few episodes.	1981–1989
Dynasty	ABC	Bart Falmont	Kevin Conroy	Bart was a closeted gay, until he was outed by Adam Carrington (Gordon Thomson). In the 1991 reunion show, Steven had followed Bart (then played by Cameron Watson) to Washington D.C. and become his lover.	1981–1989
Ellis Island	CBS	Vanessa Ogden	Kate Burton	Vanessa falls in love with a lesbian gallery owner.	1984
HeartBeat	ABC	Marilyn McGrath	Gail Strickland	Marilyn and Patty are a lesbian couple. Marilyn is a nurse practitioner and co-founder of a women's clinic, and Patty is a chef. HeartBeat is the first prime time series in the U.S. to include a lesbian (Marilyn McGrath) as a main character.	1988–1989
HeartBeat	ABC	Patty	Gina Hecht	Marilyn and Patty are a lesbian couple. Marilyn is a nurse practitioner and co-founder of a women's clinic, and Patty is a chef. HeartBeat is the first prime time series in the U.S. to include a lesbian (Marilyn McGrath) as a main character.	1988–1989
Hill Street Blues	NBC	Eddie Gregg	Charles Levin	Belker (Bruce Weitz) befriends a gay prostitute named Eddie Gregg, in episode "Trial By Fury". And in episode "Phantom Of The Hill", Eddie's lover is involved in a drug-related murder. Eddie dies of AIDS in episode "Slum Enchanted Evening".	1981–1987
Hill Street Blues	NBC	Officer Kate McBride	Lindsay Crouse	Officer McBride comes out after being falsely accused of sexually harassing a female suspect, in episode "Look Homeward, Ninja".	1981–1987
Hill Street Blues	NBC	Detective Art Bradley	Lawrence Pressman	Detective Bradley, who is off-duty, is the only witness at a deadly shooting at a gay bar. He is reluctant to come forward for fear that he'll be outed, in episode "Here's Adventure, Here's Romance".	1981–1987
Hill Street Blues	NBC	Coach Beasley	James Tolkan	Officer Coffey (Ed Marinaro) is propositioned by Coach Beasley, his former high school football coach, during a prostitution sting, in episode "Queen for a Day".	1981–1987
The Hitchhiker	HBO	Diane Hampton	Penelope Milford	In the 1985 episode 'Man at the Window', Diane is bisexual. She is in love with Carla.	1983-1991
The Hitchhiker	HBO	Carla Magnuson	Belinda Montgomery	In the 1985 episode 'Man at the Window', Diane is bisexual. She is in love with Carla.	1983-1991
Hollywood Beat	NBC	George Grinsky	John Matuszak	George was a gay informant whose business was used by undercover cops working in Hollywood. Actor John Matuszak was best known for his role as Sloth in the 1985 movie The Goonies.	1985
L.A. Law	NBC	Norman Chaney	Loren Janes	In the pilot episode, the firm discovers that their late senior partner Norman was gay.	1986–1994
L.A. Law	NBC	Christopher Appleton	Peter Frechette	(Season 1) Christopher is gay and has AIDS. Christopher is prosecuted by Grace Van Owen (Susan Dey) for the mercy-killing of his lover, who also had the disease in episode "The Venus Butterfly". Mark is Christopher's openly gay attorney. In Season 4, Mark Gilliam returns in episode "Blood, Sweat and Fears" where he is representing a widow suing a doctor, represented by Victor Siefuentes (Jimmy Smits), who refused to perform a surgical operation on her husband who was infected with AIDS. One year later in the Season 5 finale episode "Since I Fell For You", Victor represents Mark, who is in the middle stages of AIDS himself, in suing a pharmaceutical company who will not pay for Mark's experimental treatment for AIDS.	1986–1994
L.A. Law	NBC	Mark Gilliam	Stanley Kamel		1986–1994
L.A. Law	NBC	Judge Lawrence O'Neil	Donald Moffat	(Season 3) In episode "The Accidental Jurist", Michael Kuzack (Harry Hamlin) chooses retired Judge O'Neil, whom he knows is secretly gay, to hear the case of his client Matthew Leonard, an Olympic athlete suing a corporation when Leonard loses an endorsement deal after coming out.	1986–1994
L.A. Law	NBC	Matthew Leonard	Brian McNamara	(Season 3) In episode "The Accidental Jurist", Michael Kuzack (Harry Hamlin) chooses retired Judge O'Neil, whom he knows is secretly gay, to hear the case of his client Matthew Leonard, an Olympic athlete suing a corporation when Leonard loses an endorsement deal after coming out.	1986–1994
L.A. Law	NBC	Stan Vlasic	Michael Medeiros	(Season 4) Stan is gay, and a former policeman, being represented by Michael Kuzak, who sues a journalist who outed him without permission in episode "Outward Bound".	1986–1994
L.A. Law	NBC	James Campbell	Kevin Kilner	(Season 5) James is gay and is being represented by Ann Kelsey (Jill Eikenberry) who is suing the homophobic parents of his lover, who is dying of ALS, when they refuse visitation rights to James, in episode "Smoke Gets in Your Thighs".	1986–1994
L.A. Law	NBC	Cara Jean "C.J." Lamb	Amanda Donohoe	Introduced in Season 5, C.J. is bisexual, and after a celebratory dinner, her and Abby share an intimate kiss, in episode "He's a Crowd". According to Out Magazine, it was the first same-sex kiss on American television.	1986–1994
L.A. Law	NBC	Abby Perkins	Michele Greene	Introduced in Season 5, C.J. is bisexual, and after a celebratory dinner, her and Abby share an intimate kiss, in episode "He's a Crowd". According to Out Magazine, it was the first same-sex kiss on American television.	1986–1994
L.A. Law	NBC	Susan Convers	Claudia Christian	(Season 5) Susan is a transgender model represented by Douglas Brackman Jr. (Alan Rachins), who sues the cosmetics company where she worked, when her status is discovered, in episode "Speak, Lawyers, For Me".	1986–1994
L.A. Law	NBC	Maggie Barnes	Elizabeth Kemp	(Season 6) Maggie is a lesbian, and one of C.J.'s former lovers, who is being represented by Arnie Becker (Corbin Bernsen) who is being sued by her ex-husband for full custody of their two children after Maggie recently came out of the closet in episode "The Nut Before Christmas".	1986–1994
L.A. Law	NBC	Simon Matz	Anthony Fusco	(Season 7) Simon Matz is gay and being defended by Jonathan Rollins (Blair Underwood) which Matz claims that the LAPD detective, Greg Riley (Jason Beghe), who arrested him entrapped him by becoming his lover in episode "Cold Shower".	1986–1994
One Summer	Channel 4	Kidder	James Hazeldine	Kidder is a reclusive gay painter in this five-part drama series about two teenage boys from Liverpool who run away to Wales, and briefly stay with Kidder.	1983
Santa Barbara	NBC	Channing Chapwell Jr.	Robert Brian Wilson	While Channing, who was bisexual, was shot to death in a flashback during the series' first episode, he reappeared in many future episodes during flashbacks.	1984-1985
Scene	BBC	Matthew	Jason Rush	Matthew is gay and has a brief sexual relationship with Phil. In the hostile atmosphere of Section 28, a nervous BBC first avoids showing Two of Us (part of BBC Schools TV series) at all, then does, but only at 23.30.	1988
Scene	BBC	Phil	Lee Whitlock	Matthew is gay and has a brief sexual relationship with Phil. In the hostile atmosphere of Section 28, a nervous BBC first avoids showing Two of Us (part of BBC Schools TV series) at all, then does, but only at 23.30.	1988
Scruples	CBS	Alan Wilton	Michael Callan	This 1980 miniseries is based on the bestselling novel by Judith Krantz.	1980
St. Elsewhere	NBC	Kevin O'Casey	John Scott Clough	Kevin and Brett are lovers who had recurring roles on the series from 1986 to 1988.	1986-1988
St. Elsewhere	NBC	Brett Johnson	Kyle Secor	Kevin and Brett are lovers who had recurring roles on the series from 1986 to 1988.	1986-1988
Tenko	BBC, Australian Broadcasting Company (ABC)	Nellie Keene	Jeananne Crowley	Nellie is a nurse in the camp whose unrequited love for fellow inmate Sally is seen as "unnatural" by other inmates in the camp.	1981
thirtysomething	ABC	Russell Weller	David Marshall Grant	Peter has a one-night stand with Russell, in episode "Strangers" The actors were not allowed to touch during the scene and the episode generated controversy and alienated advertisers.	1987–1991
thirtysomething	ABC	Peter Montefiore	Peter Frechette	Peter has a one-night stand with Russell, in episode "Strangers" The actors were not allowed to touch during the scene and the episode generated controversy and alienated advertisers.	1987–1991
Valley of the Dolls	CBS	Vivienne Moray	Camilla Sparv	Vivienne is a Parisian lesbian artist.	1981
The Women of Brewster Place	ABC	Lorraine	Lonette McKee	Lorraine and Theresa are a lesbian couple that move into Brewster Place, where they become the subject of malicious gossip. They are the first black lesbian couple portrayed on American television.	1989
The Women of Brewster Place	ABC	Theresa "Tee"	Paula Kelly	Lorraine and Theresa are a lesbian couple that move into Brewster Place, where they become the subject of malicious gossip. They are the first black lesbian couple portrayed on American television.	1989

== 1990s ==
=== 1990 ===
Show	Network	Character	Actor	Notes	Year
21 Jump Street	FOX; Off-network syndication (S5)	Evelyn Marks	Olivia Negron	Evelyn is a lesbian history professor and an environmentalist, who is murdered. The team goes undercover at the school to investigate, in episode "A Change of Heart".	1990–1991
Beverly Hills, 90210	FOX	Ben Wester	Esteban Powell	Ben is a gay teenager, thrown out of the house, living in the car wash garage, where he is befriended by David Silver.	1990–2000
Beverly Hills, 90210	FOX	Mike Ryan	Jack Armstrong	Mike is gay and the president of his fraternity. At a wardrobe fitting for a charity event, a fraternity brother gay-baits Steve (Ian Ziering), who in response outs Mike, in episode "Blind Spot".	1990–2000
Beverly Hills, 90210	FOX	Samantha Sanders	Christine Belford	Samantha and Karen are a lesbian couple. Samantha is Steve's adoptive mother	1990–2000
Beverly Hills, 90210	FOX	Karen Lewis	Lisa Thornhill	Samantha and Karen are a lesbian couple. Samantha is Steve's adoptive mother	1990–2000
Beverly Hills, 90210	FOX	Elle	Monika Schnarre	Elle is transgender, and briefly dates Steve.	1990–2000
Beverly Hills, 90210	FOX	Alison Lash	Sara Melson	Alison is a lesbian, who had a crush on Kelly. Dana is Alison's girlfriend, and not happy about Kelly.	1990–2000
Beverly Hills, 90210	FOX	Dana	Kristine Mejia	Alison is a lesbian, who had a crush on Kelly. Dana is Alison's girlfriend, and not happy about Kelly.	1990–2000
Law & Order	NBC	Serena Southerlyn	Elisabeth Röhm	After being fired, Southerlyn came out as a lesbian in her final appearance in the series, in episode "Ain't No Love".	1990–2010
Northern Exposure	CBS	Ron Bantz	Doug Ballard	Ron and Erick are a gay couple who buy a house from Maurice (Barry Corbin) to open an upscale bed and breakfast called the Sourdough Inn. They get married in the fifth season of the series.	1990-1995
Northern Exposure	CBS	Erick Hillman	Don McManus	Ron and Erick are a gay couple who buy a house from Maurice (Barry Corbin) to open an upscale bed and breakfast called the Sourdough Inn. They get married in the fifth season of the series.	1990-1995
Northern Exposure	CBS	Cicely	Yvonne Suhor	The fictitious town of Cicely Alaska, where the show takes place, was founded by lesbian partners Cicely and Rosyln in 1908 when their car broke down in the Alaskan wilderness. Their story was told in the final episode of 1992.	1990-1995
Northern Exposure	CBS	Rosyln	Jo Anderson	The fictitious town of Cicely Alaska, where the show takes place, was founded by lesbian partners Cicely and Rosyln in 1908 when their car broke down in the Alaskan wilderness. Their story was told in the final episode of 1992.	1990-1995
Oranges Are Not the Only Fruit	BBC	Jess	Charlotte Coleman	Jess is a lesbian schoolgirl who grows up in a repressive Lancashire industrial district and finds love.	1990

=== 1991 ===
Show	Network	Character	Actor	Notes	Year
Silk Stalkings	CBS; USA	Rita Lee Lance	Mitzi Kapture	Rita is accused of being a lesbian when an old female friend is found murdered, and she was the last to see her alive.	1991–1999
Silk Stalkings	CBS; USA	Roxy	Kimberly Patton	Roxy is bisexual, and the owner of a health club found murdered after having sex.	1991–1999
Sisters	NBC	Norma Lear	Nora Dunn	Norma was a minor character; a TV producer introduced in Season 4 who was an out-and-proud lesbian (though her partner, Chris, never appeared onscreen).	1991–1996
Street Justice	Syndication	Danny Malloy	Sean O'Byrne	Malloy's gay brother Danny comes to visit looking forward to a birthday celebration, but is beaten to death by a group of young thugs just because he is gay.	

=== 1992 ===
Show	Network	Character	Actor	Notes	Year
Melrose Place	FOX	Matt Fielding	Doug Savant	After coming out, Matt is physically assaulted and fired from work because of his sexual orientation. Fox pulled a scene where Matt kissed another man after their first date. The scene included a kiss when it was filmed, but when the show aired, viewers only saw the two men shake hands and share a meaningful look.	1992–1999
Melrose Place	FOX	Jeffrey Lindley	Jason Beghe	Jeff was a closeted Navy officer, and after being outed was quickly transferred to the East Coast. He was a brief love interest of Matt.	1992–1999
Melrose Place	FOX	Dr. Paul Graham	David Beecroft	Paul was a doctor at fictional Wilshire Memorial Hospital, and had a brief sexual encounter with Matt.	1992–1999
Melrose Place	FOX	Alan Ross	Lonnie Schuyler	Alan was a closeted film actor who had a brief sexual encounter with Matt.	1992–1999
Melrose Place	FOX	Dave Erickson	Rob Youngblood	Dave was a gay friend of Matt's, and took an interest in Matt, though the sentiment was not returned.	1992–1999
Picket Fences	CBS	Lydia	Cristina Rose	Lydia has a lesbian affair while in college.	1992–1996
Picket Fences	CBS	Louise Talbot	Natalija Nogulich	Louise is a transgender teacher, revealed in episode "Pageantry".	1992–1996
Picket Fences	CBS	Gerald 'Gerry' Bey	Lenny von Dohlen	Gerry and Gordy are a gay couple raising a baby, given up by Gerry's sister, in episode ""Bye-Bye, Bey-Bey".	1992–1996
Picket Fences	CBS	Gordy Hartman	Bill Brochtrup	Gerry and Gordy are a gay couple raising a baby, given up by Gerry's sister, in episode ""Bye-Bye, Bey-Bey".	1992–1996

=== 1993 ===
Show	Network	Character	Actor	Notes	Year
Babylon 5	PTEN; TNT (S5)	Susan Ivanova	Claudia Christian	Susan's relationship with Talia was never explicitly shown on screen, but only implied. Babylon 5 creator J. Michael Straczynski and actors Claudia Christian and Andrea Thompson made it clear that there was always intended to be a romantic relationship between the two characters.	1993–1997
Babylon 5	PTEN; TNT (S5)	Talia Winters	Andrea Thompson	Susan's relationship with Talia was never explicitly shown on screen, but only implied. Babylon 5 creator J. Michael Straczynski and actors Claudia Christian and Andrea Thompson made it clear that there was always intended to be a romantic relationship between the two characters.	1993–1997
Babylon 5	PTEN; TNT (S5)	Marcus Cole	Jason Carter	Marcus and Stephen travel undercover as a gay couple on their honeymoon, they find out nobody on Mars knows about the shadow war.	1993–1997
Babylon 5	PTEN; TNT (S5)	Stephen Franklin	Richard Biggs	Marcus and Stephen travel undercover as a gay couple on their honeymoon, they find out nobody on Mars knows about the shadow war.	1993–1997
CBS Schoolbreak Special	CBS	Linda Jurgenson	Joanna Cassidy	Linda and Paula are a lesbian couple raising a teenage son, Will (Justin Whalin), who is confronted with the conservative views of his new school. Stephen Tropiano writes in his book, The Prime Time Closet, "the hour drama does an excellent job at introducing the subject of gay parenting to young viewers by exposing how prejudice is rooted in fear and ignorance".	1993
CBS Schoolbreak Special	CBS	Paula Hensen	Meredith Baxter	Linda and Paula are a lesbian couple raising a teenage son, Will (Justin Whalin), who is confronted with the conservative views of his new school. Stephen Tropiano writes in his book, The Prime Time Closet, "the hour drama does an excellent job at introducing the subject of gay parenting to young viewers by exposing how prejudice is rooted in fear and ignorance".	1993
Homicide: Life on the Street	NBC	Tim Bayliss	Kyle Secor	Tim, a main character, came out as bisexual in season 6.	1993–1999
NYPD Blue	ABC	John Irvin	Bill Brochtrup	John Irvin was a recurring character introduced in season 2 as the openly gay 15th precinct's administrative aide.	1993–2005
NYPD Blue	ABC	Officer Abby Sullivan	Paige Turco	Abby was a uniformed police officer in Seasons 4 and 5 who was a friend of Greg Medavoy (Gordon Clapp) and an open lesbian involved with a woman named Kathy (played by Lisa Darr).	1993–2005
Tales of the City	Channel 4	Anna Madrigal	Olympia Dukakis	Anna Madrigal is a trans woman. The miniseries is adapted from the novel of the same name by Armistead Maupin.	1993
Tales of the City	Channel 4	Michael Tolliver	Marcus D'Amico	Michael Tolliver is an openly gay resident of Anna Madrigal's boarding house.	1993
Tales of the City	Channel 4	Jon Fielding	Billy Campbell	John Fielding is a closeted doctor who casually dates Michael.	1993
Tales of the City	Channel 4	Dorothy Wilson	Cynda Williams	Dorothy is a closeted lesbian model who has a romantic history with Mona Ramsey (Chloe Webb).	1993
Tales of the City	Channel 4	Beauchamp Day	Thomas Gibson	Beauchamp is bisexual, having an affair with Mary Ann Singleton and later Jon Fielding.	1993

=== 1994 ===
Show	Network	Character	Actor	Notes	Year
ER	NBC	Kerry Weaver	Laura Innes	Dr. Weaver and firefighter Sandy Lopez, are a lesbian couple.	1994–2009
ER	NBC	Sandy Lopez	Lisa Vidal	Dr. Weaver and firefighter Sandy Lopez, are a lesbian couple.	1994–2009
ER	NBC	Yosh Takata	Gedde Watanabe	Yosh is an openly gay nurse.	1994–2009
ER	NBC	Maggie Doyle	Jorja Fox	Maggie is a lesbian, she was the show's first major gay character.	1994–2009
ER	NBC	Kim Legaspi	Elizabeth Mitchell	Legaspi is openly lesbian.	1994–2009
ER	NBC	Courtney Brown	Michelle Hurd	Courtney is a lesbian and was a TV producer interested in doing segments about the doctors at the hospital.	1994–2009
ER	NBC	Charles "Chaz" Pratt Jr.	Sam Jones III	Chaz is a gay resident and Dr. Pratt's half-brother.	1994–2009
Family Album	NBC	Lionel Thayer	Joe Flanigan	Lionel comes out to his parents. His mother is surprised, and accepts the news, but his father is outraged and cuts him out of his life, and forbids his other children to ever contact him again. Based on Danielle Steel's novel of the same name.	1994
Family Album	NBC	John	Joel Gretsch	John is Lionel's boyfriend, they get into a car accident and John dies.	1994
Family Album	NBC	Paul Steel	Paul Satterfield	Paul Steel is a drug addicted actor who was recently fired. He becomes romantically involved with Lionel.	1994
My So-Called Life	ABC	Enrique 'Rickie' Vasquez	Wilson Cruz	Rickie is an openly gay teenager who lived with an abusive uncle who threw him out, and then moved away without telling him. Homeless and nowhere to go, he asks his gay teacher Mr. Katimske for help, who takes him in. In an interview for The Advocate, Wilson Cruz, who is openly gay, said he identified with his character as his dad also threw him out when he came out.	1994–1995
My So-Called Life	ABC	Mr. Katimski	Jeff Perry	Rickie is an openly gay teenager who lived with an abusive uncle who threw him out, and then moved away without telling him. Homeless and nowhere to go, he asks his gay teacher Mr. Katimske for help, who takes him in. In an interview for The Advocate, Wilson Cruz, who is openly gay, said he identified with his character as his dad also threw him out when he came out.	1994–1995
Party of Five	Fox	Ross Werkman	Mitchell Anderson	Ross is openly gay and a violin teacher.	1994–2000
Party of Five	Fox	Perry Marks	Olivia d'Abo	(Season 5) Perry is lesbian and a university professor.	1994–2000
Party of Five	Fox	Victor	Wilson Cruz	(Season 6) Victor is openly gay and the nanny of Owen Salinger.	1994–2000
Touched by an Angel	CBS	Tony Du Bois	Lawrence Monoson	Danny is gay, and has come home to die due to AIDS.	1994-2003

=== 1995 ===
Show	Network	Character	Actor	Notes	Year
Courthouse	CBS	Judge Rosetta Reide	Jennifer Lewis	Judge Reide is a single mother involved in a lesbian relationship with her housekeeper.	1995
Courthouse	CBS	Danny Gates	Cree Summer	Danny is a housekeeper for Judge Rosetta Reide and involved in a lesbian relationship with her.	1995
Liberty Street	CBC Television	Nathan Jones	Billy Merasty	Nathan is gay, and an ex-bicycle courier. He is a tenant of a warehouse converted into apartments, which is the premise of the show.	1995
Liberty Street	CBC Television	James Wilder	Keith Knight	James is a banker and Nathan's boyfriend, introduced at the start of the second season.	1995
Live Shot	UPN	Lou Waller	Tom Byrd	Waller is the sports anchor at fictional television station KXZX. He comes out as gay in the final episode of the series, "Decisions, Decisions".	1995–1996
Murder One	ABC	Louis Hines	John Fleck	Louis is gay and the personal assistant to lead attorney Ted Hoffman (Daniel Benzali).	1995–1997

=== 1996 ===
Show	Network	Character	Actor	Notes	Year
Matt Waters	CBS	Russ Achoa	Felix A. Pire	Russ is a gay high school student.	1996
Pacific Drive	Nine Network	Zoe Marshall	Libby Tanner	Zoe is a bed-hopping lesbian who gets pregnant and married a male prostitute to keep him in the country.	1996-2001
Pacific Drive	Nine Network	Margeaux Hayes	Virginia Hey	Margeaux is lesbian and Zoe's first love interest.	1996-2001
Pacific Drive	Nine Network	Dior Shelby	Clodagh Crowe	Dior is lesbian and Zoe's second girlfriend.	1996-2001
Pacific Drive	Nine Network	Kay West	Brigid Kelly	Kay is lesbian and Zoe's third girlfriend.	1996-2001
Pacific Drive	Nine Network	Sondra Westwood	Helen Dallimore	Sondra is lesbian and Zoe's fourth girlfriend.	1996-2001
Pacific Drive	Nine Network	Gemma Patterson	Katherine Lee	Gemma is lesbian and Zoe's fifth girlfriend.	1996-2001
Pacific Drive	Nine Network	Jo	Jason Langley	Jo is transgender and Tim's friend.	1996-2001
Profiler	NBC	George Fraley	Peter Frechette	George is an openly gay computer hacker, a member of the Violent Crimes Task Force.	1996–2000
Relativity	ABC	Rhonda Roth	Lisa Edelstein	Rhonda is the lesbian sister of lead character Leo.	1996–1997
Sweat	Network Ten	Snowy Bowles	Heath Ledger	Snowy is a 17-year-old gay cyclist at a fictional Australian school for athletically gifted teens. Ledger's character was the first time a gay teenager had been portrayed on Australian television.	1996
This Life	BBC	Warren Jones	Jason Hughes	Warren is gay and one of the lead characters from season one.	1996–1997
This Life	BBC	Ferdinand "Ferdy" Garcia	Ramon Tikaram	Ferdy is bisexual and Warren's on-off love interest (season 1). He begins coming to terms with his sexuality when he develops a relationship with Lenny (season 2).	1996–1997
This Life	BBC	Lenny	Tony Curran	Lenny is gay.	1996–1997
This Life	BBC	Sarah Newly	Clare Clifford	Sarah is lesbian. She is attracted to Anna Forbes and tries to seduce her.	1996–1997
Water Rats	Nine Network	Sergent Helen Blakemore	Toni Scanlan	Helen is an openly lesbian police officer. The series was based on the work of the Sydney Water Police.	1996-2001

=== 1997 ===
Show	Network	Character	Actor	Notes	Year
Buffy the Vampire Slayer	WB; UPN	Willow Rosenberg	Alyson Hannigan	Willow is bisexual. While she was in a relationship with Daniel "Oz" Osbourne in seasons three to four, she later enters a relationship with Tara in season 4.	1997–2003
Buffy the Vampire Slayer	WB; UPN	Tara Maclay	Amber Benson	Tara is lesbian.	1997–2003
Buffy the Vampire Slayer	WB; UPN	Kennedy	Iyari Limon	Kennedy is lesbian. Introduced in season 7, she becomes involved with Willow.	1997–2003
Buffy the Vampire Slayer	WB; UPN	Andrew Wells	Tom Lenk	Andrew was confirmed to be gay by series creator Joss Whedon although it was never directly stated on-screen.	1997–2003
Buffy the Vampire Slayer	WB; UPN	Larry Blaisdell	Larry Bagby	Larry, Xander's bully from season one, tells Xander he's gay in season two.	1997–2003
Buffy the Vampire Slayer	WB; UPN	Scott Hope	Fab Filippo	Scott, a character in season three, is revealed to be gay in season seven.	1997–2003
Oz	HBO	Tobias Beecher	Lee Tergesen	Tobias and Christopher have an intense love/hate relationship.	1997–2003
Oz	HBO	Christopher Keller	Christopher Meloni	Christopher and Tobias were lovers.	1997–2003
Oz	HBO	Alonzo Torquemada	Bobby Cannavale	Bobby was a gay drug dealer.	1997–2003
Oz	HBO	Billie Keane	Derrick Simmons	Billie self-identifies as gay.	1997–2003
Oz	HBO	Richie Hanlon	Jordan Lage	Richie represented gay inmates on the fictional Em City council.	1997–2003
Oz	HBO	Jason Cramer	Rob Bogue	Jason was gay and in prison for murdering his lover.	1997–2003
Oz	HBO	Nat "Natalie" Ginsberg	Charles Busch	Natalie was a member of the gay faction.	1997–2003
Wilde	BBC	Oscar Wilde	Stephen Fry	Oscar was a gay poet who was arrested and prosecuted for his homosexual relationships	1997
Wilde	BBC	Robbie Ross	Michael Sheen	Robbie was Oscar Wilde's first male lover	1997
Wilde	BBC	Lord Alfred Douglas	Jude Law	Alfred was Oscar Wilde's second male lover	1997

=== 1998 ===
Show	Network	Character	Actor	Notes	Year
All Saints	Seven Network	Dr. Charlotte Beaumont	Tammy MacIntosh	Started out in the series identifying as a lesbian, but then had a relationship with a man, had a child, and is now more bisexual than gay.	1998–2009
Dawson's Creek	WB	Jack McPhee	Kerr Smith	Jack comes out as gay in season 2. Jack also shares a passionate kiss with Ethan in an episode titled "True Love". This kiss sparks a conversation with Jack's father in which he opens up about the struggle of feeling so different and finally earns acceptance from his father.	1998–2003
Dawson's Creek	WB	Doug Witter	Dylan Neal	Doug constantly denied he was gay through most of the show but he finally came to terms with his relationship with Jack in the final episode of the series.	1998–2003
Dawson's Creek	WB	Ethan Brody	Adam Kaufman	Ethan and Jack share a passionate kiss. Ethan and Jack's kiss was the first passionate gay kiss on an American primetime TV show.	1998–2003
Dawson's Creek	WB	Toby	David Monahan	Toby is the founder of a Gay-Straight coalition and a passionate LGBT activist.	1998–2003
Dawson's Creek	WB	Eric	Ryan Bittle	Eric was closeted and a former fraternity brother of Jack, who helped him come out.	1998–2003
Dawson's Creek	WB	David	Greg Rikaart	David was a boyfriend of Jack.	1998–2003
Felicity	WB	Javier Clemente Quintata	Ian Gomez	Javier is gay and manager of a coffee house; his partner throughout most of the series is Samuel.	1998–2002
Felicity	WB	Samuel	Austin Tichenor	Samuel and his partner Javier get married in episode "The Biggest Deal There Is", the 1999–2000 series finale.	1998–2002
Felicity	WB	Ryan Crane	Eddie McClintock	Ryan comes out as gay in the episode "Love and Marriage".	1998–2002
Playing the Field	BBC One	Gabrielle Holmes	Saira Todd	Gabrielle is in a lesbian relationship with her soccer teammate Angie.	1998–2002
Playing the Field	BBC One	Angie Gill	Tracy Whitwell	Angie is in a lesbian relationship with her soccer teammate Gabrielle.	1998–2002
Stingers	Nine Network	Christina Dichiera	Jacinta Stapleton	Chris is bisexual (Seasons 6–8). She is a young constable recruited into a deep undercover unit of the Victorian Police, who had a brief affair with the daughter of her unit's commander, as well as sharing a kiss with the female protagonist of the series, Angie Piper (Kate Kendall}.	1998–2004

=== 1999 ===
Show	Network	Character	Actor	Notes	Year
Bad Girls	ITV	Helen Stewart	Simone Lahbib	Helen is bisexual and the wing governor of G-Wing.	1999–2006
Bad Girls	ITV	Nikki Wade	Mandana Jones	Nikki is a lesbian inmate sent to prison after killing a police officer she caught raping her girlfriend, Trisha.	1999–2006
Bad Girls	ITV	Denny Blood	Alicya Eyo	Denny is lesbian and is serving time for arson. Her girlfriend is Shaz and is sometimes involved with Shell.	1999–2006
Bad Girls	ITV	Shaz Wiley	Lindsey Fawcett	Shaz is bisexual, serving time for manslaughter and the girlfriend of Denny.	1999–2006
Bad Girls	ITV	Shell Dockley	Debra Stephenson	Shell is a bisexual inmate involved with Denny and Jim Fenner.	1999–2006
Bad Girls	ITV	"Mad" Tessa Spall	Helen Schlesinger	Tessa is an aggressive lesbian prisoner that bullies Nikki, resulting in a fight between them.	1999–2006
Bad Girls	ITV	Pat Kerrigan	Liz May Brice	Pat is bisexual, sent to prison for stabbing her ex-boyfriend.	1999–2006
Bad Girls	ITV	Sheena Williams	Laura Rogers	Sheena is lesbian, serving time for drugs and hooks up with Pat.	1999–2006
Bad Girls	ITV	Lorna Rose	Luisa Bradshaw-White	Lorna is lesbian and a prison officer.	1999–2006
Bad Girls	ITV	Al McKenzie	Pauline Campbell	Al is a lesbian and a member of the fictional Peckham Boot Gang. She is poisoned and dies in season 6.	1999–2006
Bad Girls	ITV	Cassie Tyler	Kellie Bright	Cassie is lesbian, and serving three years for fraud and embezzling from her own company.	1999–2006
Bad Girls	ITV	Roisin Connor	Siobhan McCarthy	Roisin is bisexual, serving four years for covering up embezzling at her work.	1999–2006
Bad Girls	ITV	Kris Yates	Jennifer Ness	Kris is lesbian, sent to prison for murdering her father, it is later revealed that her younger sister killed their father. but Kris protected her.	1999–2006
Bad Girls	ITV	Selena Geeson	Charlotte Lucas	Selena is lesbian, and became a prison guard to be close to her lover Kris.	1999–2006
Bad Girls	ITV	Arun Parmar	Rebecca Hazlewood	Arun is a bisexual trans woman, serving three years for credit card fraud.	1999–2006
Bad Girls	ITV	Mandy Goodhue	Angela Bruce	Mandy is lesbian, and a correctional officer in G-Wing.	1999–2006
Bad Girls	ITV	Trisha	Victoria Pritchard	Trisha is lesbian and Nikki's partner. She breaks up with Nikki.	1999–2006
Bad Girls	ITV	Neil Grayling	James Gaddas	Neil is a closeted gay and G-Wing governor, he dies of a heart attack in season 8.	1999–2006
Bad Girls	ITV	Natalie Buxton	Dannielle Brent	Natalie is lesbian, and is beaten to death with a brick by fellow inmates, her body was disposed of down the drain.	1999–2006
Law & Order: Special Victims Unit	NBC	Dr. George Huang	B. D. Wong	Dr. Huang is a psychiatrist and FBI agent who frequently consults with the Special Victims Unit. He first casually mentions his homosexuality in the 2009 episode "Hardwired".	1999–
Law & Order: Special Victims Unit	NBC	Ken Randall	Ernest Waddell	Ken is openly gay and is the son of Detective Odafin Tutuola (Ice-T).	1999–
Once and Again	ABC	Jessie Sammler	Evan Rachel Wood	Jessie is bisexual, and in episode "The Gay-Straight Alliance", she confesses her feelings for Katie and they start a relationship.	1999–2002
Once and Again	ABC	Katie Singer	Mischa Barton	Katie is lesbian, and starts dating Jesse after revealing her feelings for her in episode "The Gay-Straight Alliance".	1999–2002
Queer as Folk	Channel 4	Stuart Alan Jones	Aidan Gillen	Stuart is an openly gay public relations executive. Stuart is best friends with Vince and Nathan.	1999–2000
Queer as Folk	Channel 4	Vince Tyler	Craig Kelly	Vince is an openly gay super market manager. Vince is best friends with Stuart and Nathan.	1999–2000
Queer as Folk	Channel 4	Nathan Maloney	Charlie Hunnam	Nathan is an openly gay 15-year-old student. Nathan is best friends with Vince and Stuart.	1999–2000
Queer as Folk	Channel 4	Alexander Perry	Antony Cotton	Alexander is gay and Vince and Stu's friend.	1999–2000
Queer as Folk	Channel 4	Lisa Levene	Saira Todd	Lisa is the lesbian partner of Romey.	1999–2000
Queer as Folk	Channel 4	Romey Sullivan	Esther Hall	Romey and Lisa are a lesbian couple who conceive a baby with the help of their gay best friend Stuart.	1999–2000
Queer as Folk	Channel 4	Cameron Roberts	Peter O'Brien	Cameron is a gay accountant who began a relationship with Vince.	1999–2000
Queer as Folk	Channel 4	Siobhan Potter	Juley McCann	Siobhan is lesbian and a friend of Romey and Lisa.	1999–2000
Queer as Folk	Channel 4	Dane McAteer	Adam Zane	Dane is gay and was prone to having accidents.	1999–2000
Queer as Folk	Channel 4	Phil Delaney	Jason Merrells	Phil is gay and a close friend of Vince and Stuart.	1999–2000
Queer as Folk	Channel 4	Daniel "Dazz" Collinson	Jonathon Natynczyk	Dazz is a bartender who has a brief relationship with Nathan.	1999–2000
Queer as Folk	Channel 4	Suzie Smith	Sarah Jones	Suzie is Siobhan's girlfriend.	1999–2000
The Sopranos	HBO	Vito Spatafore	Joseph R. Gannascoli	Vito was murdered in season 6 for being gay.	1999–2007
Wasteland	ABC	Russell Baskind	Dan Montgomery, Jr.	Russell is a closeted soap opera star.	1999
Wasteland	ABC	Cliff Dobbs	Frank Grillo	Cliff is a reporter.	1999

== 2000s ==
=== 2000 ===
Show	Network	Character	Actor	Notes	Year
Dark Angel	Fox	Cynthia 'Original Cindy' McEachin	Valarie Rae Miller	Cynthia is a lesbian. She has a short reunion with her ex-lover Diamond (Tangelia Rouse) in episode "Shorties in Love".	2000–2002
Frank Herbert's Dune	SyFy	Vladimir Harkonnen	Ian McNeice	Vladimir has been described as a predatory homosexual given to pederasty and incest, and is an unrepentant rapist and murderer. The miniseries is based on the 1965 eponymous novel.	2000
Hospital Central	Telecinco	Esther García	Fátima Baeza	Esther is bisexual and had several relationships with men until she fell in love with Macarena.	2000–2012
Hospital Central	Telecinco	Macarena "Maca" Fernández	Patricia Vico	Maca is a lesbian pediatrician, who marries Esther.	2000–2012
Hospital Central	Telecinco	Verónica Solé	Carolina Cerezuela	Vero is a lesbian psychiatrist and briefly dated Maca.	2000–2012
Hospital Central	Telecinco	Beatriz "Bea" Lasa Maldonado	Sandra Ferrús	Bea is a bisexual and briefly dated Esther, until she became obsessive and attempted to kill them both.	2000–2012
Queer as Folk	Showtime	Melanie Marcus	Michelle Clunie	Melanie is lesbian, and in a relationship with Lindsay and are raising a daughter and son together.	2000–2005
Queer as Folk	Showtime	Lindsay Peterson	Thea Gill	Lindsay is bisexual, and in a relationship with Melanie and are raising a daughter and son together.	2000–2005
Queer as Folk	Showtime	Ben Bruckner	Robert Gant	Ben is married to Michael, he has HIV.	2000–2005
Queer as Folk	Showtime	Brian Kinney	Gale Harold	Brian is gay and the soulmate of Justin Taylor.	2000–2005
Queer as Folk	Showtime	Justin Taylor	Randy Harrison	Justin is gay and has an on-and-off open relationship with Brian, and had been with another romantic partner named Ethan for a short period of time.	2000–2005
Queer as Folk	Showtime	Ted Schmidt	Scott Lowell	Ted is openly gay and uncomfortable with his age.	2000–2005
Queer as Folk	Showtime	Emmett Honeycutt	Peter Paige	Emmett is gay and good friends with Ted Schmidt. He is notable for his airy witticisms and flamboyant fashion sense.	2000–2005
Queer as Folk	Showtime	Dr. David Cameron	Chris Potter	David is gay and a chiropractor, he has a brief relationship with Michael before moving back to Portland, Oregon.	2000–2005
Queer as Folk	Showtime	Michael Novotny	Hal Sparks	Michael is married to Ben and they adopt a teenager together.	2000–2005
Queer as Folk	Showtime	Vic Grassi	Jack Wetherall	Vic is gay and old enough to remember the gay culture of the 1970s and early 1980s. He would sometimes reminisce about his carefree life as a young 20-something during the disco era.	2000–2005
Queer as Folk	Showtime	Dusty	Rae Ellen Bodie	Dusty is lesbian and a friend of Melanie and Lindsay. She dies in a bomb explosion at the local gay nightclub during the final season of the show.	2000–2005
Queer as Folk	Showtime	Drew Boyd	Matt Battaglia	Drew was a closeted football player, who eventually came out as gay.	2000–2005
Queer as Folk	Showtime	Ethan Gold	Fab Filippo	Ethan is gay and a violin player, and had a short-lived relationship with Justin Taylor.	2000–2005
Queer as Folk	Showtime	Kiki	Greg Campbell	Kiki is a trans woman and takes over the fictional Liberty Diner when Deb retires.	2000–2005
Queer as Folk	Showtime	Leda	Nancy Anne Sakovich	Leda is lesbian and engages in strings of one-night stands, hates gay marriage, and hires lesbian strippers.	2000–2005
Queer as Folk	Showtime	Blake Wyzecki	Dean Armstrong	Blake is gay and a drug addict. He gets involved with Ted who attempts to get him help for his addiction.	2000–2005
Queer as Folk	Showtime	Kip Johnson	Barna Moricz	Kip is gay and gets hired by Brian at his ad agency. Kip seduces Brian into having sex on his desk.	2000–2005
Queer as Folk	Showtime	George Schickle	Bruce Gray	George is a gay millionaire, and owns a successful pickle company, he has a brief sexual relationship with Emmett.	2000–2005

=== 2001 ===
Show	Network	Character	Actor	Notes	Year
24	Fox	Mandy	Mia Kirshner	Mandy is bisexual and a recurring character who is a professional assassin for hire.	2001–2005
100 Centre Street	A&E	Judge Atallah Sims	LaTanya Richardson	Attallah is a conservative lesbian African American judge.	2001–2002
Degrassi: The Next Generation	CTV; Much TV; MTV	Marco Del Rossi	Adamo Ruggiero	Marco is gay, and also a good dancer. He has brief relationships with Dylan and Tim.	2001–2015
Degrassi: The Next Generation	CTV; Much TV; MTV	Dylan Michalchuk	John Bregar	Dylan is Marco's boyfriend, also Paige's older brother.	2001–2015
Degrassi: The Next Generation	CTV; Much TV; MTV	Paige Michalchuk	Lauren Collins	Paige is bisexual and an overachiever.	2001–2015
Degrassi: The Next Generation	CTV; Much TV; MTV	Tim	Alex House	Tim is gay and briefly dates Marco.	2001–2015
Degrassi: The Next Generation	CTV; Much TV; MTV	Alex Nuñez	Deanna Casaluce	Alex is lesbian and Paige's girlfriend. She went into sports therapy, and was a stripper on the side.	2001–2015
Degrassi: The Next Generation	CTV; Much TV; MTV	Riley Stavros	Argiris Karras	Riley is gay and initially struggles with his sexuality.	2001–2015
Degrassi: The Next Generation	CTV; Much TV; MTV	Zane Park	Shannon Kook-Chun	Zane is Riley's boyfriend.	2001–2015
Degrassi: The Next Generation	CTV; Much TV; MTV	Adam Torres	Jordan Todosey	Adam is a heterosexual trans man, that died in a car crash while texting.	2001–2015
Degrassi: The Next Generation	CTV; Much TV; MTV	Fiona Coyne	Annie Clark	Fiona briefly dates Adam, then realizes she is lesbian.	2001–2015
Degrassi: The Next Generation	CTV; Much TV; MTV	Tristan Milligan	Lyle O'Donohoe	Tristan is gay.	2001–2015
Degrassi: The Next Generation	CTV; Much TV; MTV	Imogen Moreno	Cristine Prosperi	Imogen is a pansexual who fell for Fiona.	2001–2015
Degrassi: The Next Generation	CTV; Much TV; MTV	Jack Jones	Niamh Wilson	Jack is a lesbian, and a dancer, that briefly dates Imogen.	2001–2015
Degrassi: The Next Generation	CTV; Much TV; MTV	Miles Hollingsworth III	Eric Osborne	Miles begins dating Tristan, eventually coming out as bisexual. He frequently skips school to smoke pot.	2001–2015
Degrassi: The Next Generation	CTV; Much TV; MTV	Zoe Rivas	Ana Golja	Zoe struggles with her sexuality until admitting to herself she is lesbian.	2001–2015
Degrassi: The Next Generation	CTV; Much TV; MTV	Charlie Lima	Tamara Duarte	Charlie is a lesbian artist and model, and dates Fiona for a while.	2001–2015
The Education of Max Bickford	CBS	Erica Bettis	Helen Shaver	Erica is a heterosexual trans woman. She is a good friend of Max.	2001–2002
Leap Years	Showtime	Gregory Paget	Garret Dillahunt	This series follows characters in three different time settings, 1993, 2001 and 2008. Gregory pursues heterosexual relationships in 1993, but in 2001 and 2008 time settings, he is exclusively gay.	2001–2002
Metrosexuality	Channel 4	Max	Rikki Beadle-Blair	Kwame attempts to reunite his separated dads, Jordan and Max, but Max has placed a dating ad.	2001
Metrosexuality	Channel 4	Jordan	Karl Collins	Jordan is one of Kwame's dads, and has a new lover.	2001
Metrosexuality	Channel 4	Dean	Paul Keating	Dean is gay, and a talented footballer who has a crush on Max.	2001
Metrosexuality	Channel 4	Bambi	Davey Fairbanks	Bambi is gay and a skateboarder, who is trying to secure a commitment from his boyfriend Robin.	2001
Metrosexuality	Channel 4	Cindy	Carleen Beadle	Cindy is bisexual and her partner is Doris.	2001
Metrosexuality	Channel 4	Doris	Dee Dee Samuels	Doris is lesbian, and Cindy's partner.	2001
The Secret Life of Us	Network 10	Simon Trader	David Tredinnick	Simon is gay and a bartender.	2001–2005
The Secret Life of Us	Network 10	Richie Blake	Spencer McLaren	Richie is a gay actor, and had a very brief relationship with Miranda.	2001–2005
The Secret Life of Us	Network 10	Miranada Lang	Abi Tucker	Miranda is bisexual, and Chloe's girlfriend.	2001–2005
The Secret Life of Us	Network 10	Chloe	Nina Liu	Chloe is bisexual, and Miranda's girlfriend.	2001–2005
Six Feet Under	HBO	David Fisher	Michael C. Hall	David is gay, a funeral director, and his partner is Keith.	2001–2005
Six Feet Under	HBO	Keith Charles	Mathew St. Patrick	Keith is a gay police officer and David's partner.	2001–2005

=== 2002 ===
Show	Network	Character	Actor	Notes	Year
Everwood	WB	Carl Feeney	Dylan Walsh	Carl comes out as gay after his wife Nina, catches him having an affair with a man.	2002–2006
Everwood	WB	Kyle Hunter	Steven R. McQueen	Kyle is the sensitive gay character and music student tutored by lead character Ephram Brown.	2002–2006
Firefly	Fox	Inara Serra	Morena Baccarin	Inara is pansexual. She hires herself out as a courtesan to upper-class clients and dignitaries, male or female, that seek sexual pleasure and accompaniment at social functions.	2002–2003
Firefly	Fox	The Councillor	Katherine Kendall	Appearing in episode "War Stories", the Councilor is lesbian, and one of the few female customers of Inaras.	2002–2003
The Shield	FX	Julien Lowe	Michael Jace	Julien was a police officer who struggled with his homosexuality due to his devout Christian beliefs.	2002–2008
Tipping the Velvet	BBC Two	Nan Astly	Rachael Stirling	Nan is a lesbian, and is entranced by Kitty when she sees her perform. Nan is also a Drag king.	2002
Tipping the Velvet	BBC Two	Kitty Butler	Keeley Hawes	Kitty is bisexual, and a male impersonator who Nan falls for.	2002
Tipping the Velvet	BBC Two	Diana Lethaby	Anna Chancellor	Diana is a wealthy lesbian, who makes Nan her live-in girl toy for a year.	2002
Tipping the Velvet	BBC Two	Florence Banner	Jodhi May	Florence is a lesbian and socialist activist, who Nan moves in with after being kicked out by Diana.	2002
Tipping the Velvet	BBC Two	Zena Blake	Sally Hawkins	Zena is lesbian, and a love interest of Nan.	2002
The Wire	HBO	Kima Greggs	Sonja Sohn	Kima is lesbian, and a police detective.	2002–2008
The Wire	HBO	Omar Little	Michael K. Williams	Omar is openly gay, and robs drug dealers for a living. He has several boyfriends throughout the show, until his murder by drug dealers.	2002–2008
The Wire	HBO	Felicia "Snoop" Pearson	Felicia Pearson	Snoop is lesbian and was killed by a drug dealer, who correctly believed she was about to shoot him.	2002–2008
The Wire	HBO	William Rawls	John Doman	William's sexuality is not openly discussed, but he is seen in a gay bar during Season 3. John Dorman said in an interview that he gets asked a lot if his character was gay, and replied, "I think people have to decide if they think Rawls was actually gay or if he was just hanging out on some police business".	2002–2008
The Wire	HBO	Cheryl	Melanie Nicholls-King	Cheryl is lesbian, and was Kima's girlfriend. After they have a child together, Kima realizes she does not want to be a parent and they break up.	2002–2008
The Wire	HBO	Brandon Wright	Michael Kevin Darnall	Brandon is gay, and was a boyfriend of Omar. He was tortured and murdered by drug dealers.	2002–2008
The Wire	HBO	Dante	Ernest Waddell	Dante is gay, and became Omar's new boyfriend a year after Brandon was murdered.	2002–2008
The Wire	HBO	Renaldo	Ramon Rodriguez	Renaldo is gay, and was a getaway-taxi driver. He was also a boyfriend of Omar.	2002–2008
The Wire	HBO	Kimmy	Kelli R. Brown	Kimmy is lesbian, and Tosha's girlfriend. They rob drug dealers together.	2002–2008
The Wire	HBO	Tosha Mitchell	Edwina Findley	Tosha is lesbian, and Kimmy's girlfriend. They rob drug dealers together. She was accidentally killed by Omar's boyfriend Dante.	2002–2008

=== 2003 ===
Show	Network	Character	Actor	Notes	Year
Angels in America	HBO	Prior Walter	Justin Kirk	Prior is gay, and dying from AIDS. Louis is his lover who cannot bare to watch Prior suffer. Angels in America is a saga that intertwines the fates of four gay men.	2003
Angels in America	HBO	Louis Ironson	Ben Shenkman	Louis is gay and Prior's lover. He works in a courthouse as a chief clerk to a judge.	2003
Angels in America	HBO	Joe Pitt	Patrick Wilson	Joe is a closeted gay, conservative judge, and a Mormon.	2003
Angels in America	HBO	Belize	Jeffrey Wright	Belize is a gay nurse, and the go-between for Prior and Louis. This drama was nominated for 21 Emmys, and won 11, including outstanding miniseries. It was based on the Pulitzer Prize–winning 1991 play of the same name.	2003
Bright Young Things	Prime Video	Miles Maitland	Michael Sheen	Miles is a gay socialite in the 1930s who is forced to flee the country to avoid prosecution for his homosexuality	2003
Carnivàle	HBO	Sofie Agnesh Bojakshiya	Clea DuVall	Sophie is bisexual, and the tarot card reader at the traveling carnival.	2003–2005
Carnivàle	HBO	Libby Dreifuss	Carla Gallo	Libby is bisexual, and a dancer in her family's Cooch Show for the traveling carnival.	2003–2005
Cold Case	CBS	Rose Collins	Samantha Streets	Collins and Duncette are two lesbians who falls in love with each other during the Prohibition era.	2003–2010
Cold Case	CBS	Rose Collins	Piper Laurie	Collins and Duncette are two lesbians who falls in love with each other during the Prohibition era.	2003–2010
Cold Case	CBS	Billie Ducette	Tessa Thompson	Collins and Duncette are two lesbians who falls in love with each other during the Prohibition era.	2003–2010
Crystal Boys	PTS	during Prohibition A-Qing	Fan Chi-wei	A-Qing is gay, and is expelled from school because of scandalous relations with classmate Zhao Ying. After his father kicks him out, he hangs out at a park, known for gay cruising.	2003
Crystal Boys	PTS	Zhao Ying	Yang Youning	Zhao Ying is gay, and has a sexual relationship with A-Qing. This series is based on the novel, Crystal Boys, written by Pai Hsien-yung.	2003
NCIS	CBS	Ned Dorneget	Matt L. Jones	Ned was a cyber operations special agent who comes out as gay in episode, "Need to Know".	2003–
Nip/Tuck	FX	Liz Cruz	Roma Maffia	Liz is openly lesbian, and head anesthesiologist at the clinic.	2003–2010
Nip/Tuck	FX	Sophia Lopez	Jonathan Del Arco	Sophia is a lesbian transgender woman, who has a romantic relationship with Liz.	2003–2010
Nip/Tuck	FX	Ava Moore	Famke Janssen	Ava is a transgender sexual predator, who seduces her own son as well as other young men.	2003–2010
Nip/Tuck	FX	Dr. Quentin Costa	Bruno Campos	Dr. Costa is intersex and openly gay.	2003–2010
Nip/Tuck	FX	Kit McGraw	Rhona Mitra	Kit is bisexual, and a British detective who is brought in to help investigate a case in Miami. She has an incestuous relationship with her brother.	2003–2010
Nip/Tuck	FX	Vanessa Bartholomew	Kate Mara	Vaness is bisexual, and Matt's girlfriend in season one.	2003–2010
Nip/Tuck	FX	Cherry Peck	Willam Belli	Cherry is transgender and was beaten up by Matt, who was not pleased to find out she had a penis. They later become good friends.	2003–2010
Nip/Tuck	FX	Julia McNamara	Joely Richardson	Julia is bisexual and was married to Dr. Sean McNamara, but following their divorce, she fell in love with Olivia.	2003–2010
Nip/Tuck	FX	Olivia Lord	Portia de Rossi	Olivia is lesbian, and an expert in Eastern medicine. She died during a facelift.	2003–2010
The O.C.	Fox	Marissa Cooper	Mischa Barton	Marissa is bisexual, and has a brief relationship with Alex Kelly in season 2.	2003–2007
The O.C.	Fox	Alex Kelly	Olivia Wilde	Alex is bisexual, and has a brief relationship with Marissa Cooper in season 2.	2003–2007
The O.C.	Fox	Carson Ward	Brian McNamara	Carson is secretly gay, until his son Luke, catches him kissing another man. Carson eventually comes out to his family.	2003–2007
The O.C.	Fox	Todd	Todd Sherry	Todd and Patrick are a gay couple who reside in Sandy and Kirsten Cohens' first home in Berkeley, California. After an earthquake in Newport destroys their house, the Cohens' want to buy back their first home from Todd and Patrick, who end up selling it back to them. This episode was the series finale.	2003–2007
The O.C.	Fox	Patrick	Jim Pirri	Todd and Patrick are a gay couple who reside in Sandy and Kirsten Cohens' first home in Berkeley, California. After an earthquake in Newport destroys their house, the Cohens' want to buy back their first home from Todd and Patrick, who end up selling it back to them. This episode was the series finale.	2003–2007
One Tree Hill	WB	Anna Taggaro	Daniella Alonso	Anna is bisexual and a classmate of Peyton's. She eventually comes out after being harassed.	2003–2011
One Tree Hill	WB	Josh Avery	Paul Teal	Josh is a secretly gay actor. After confiding in a friend and getting acceptance, he decides to come out to his family and friends.	2003–2011

=== 2004 ===
Show	Network	Character	Actor	Notes	Year
Battlestar Galactica	Syfy	Felix Gaeta	Alessandro Juliani	In the webisodes The Face of the Enemy, Felix is shown to be in a romantic relationship with Lieutenant Louis Hoshi.	2004–2009
Battlestar Galactica	Syfy	Six	Tricia Helfer	Six, D'Anna and Gaius were shown to be in a relationship together.	2004–2009
Battlestar Galactica	Syfy	D'Anna	Lucy Lawless	Six, D'Anna and Gaius were shown to be in a relationship together.	2004–2009
Battlestar Galactica	Syfy	Helena Cain	Michelle Forbes	Helena had a romantic relationship with a civilian network analyst, Gina Inviere, who she later discovered was one of the model Six Cylons.	2004–2009
Deadwood	HBO	Joanie Stubbs	Kim Dickens	Joanie is a lesbian, and along with her friend Maddie, opens a brothel that imports high-class and experienced prostitutes from the East. She also gets involved with Jane in a relationship.	2004–2006
Deadwood	HBO	Jane Canary	Robin Weigert	Jane is a lesbian, and a frontierswoman and former scout for General George Armstrong Custer. She first arrived in Deadwood with Wild Bill Hickok and Charlie Utter. Jane also gets involved with Joanie in a relationship.	2004–2006
Desperate Housewives	ABC	Andrew Van de Kamp	Shawn Pyfrom	Andrew is the first gay character on the show. Justin was his first boyfriend, whom he was caught with naked in a swimming pool making out. Andrew gets engaged to Alex Cominis in season 5.	2004–2012
Desperate Housewives	ABC	Justin	Ryan Carnes	Justin comes out to Gabrielle; he is also Andrew's first boyfriend.	2004–2012
Desperate Housewives	ABC	Alex Cominis	Todd Grinnell	Alex is a gay plastic surgeon, and engaged to Andrew in season 5, but eventually leaves him over Andrew's drinking.	2004–2012
Desperate Housewives	ABC	Peter McMillan	Lee Tergesen	Peter is bisexual, and had an affair with both Bree, and her son Andrew.	2004–2012
Desperate Housewives	ABC	Bob Hunter	Tuc Watkins	Bob and Lee are the first gay couple that move to Wisteria Lane. Bob is a lawyer, while Lee is a real estate agent.	2004–2012
Desperate Housewives	ABC	Lee McDermott	Kevin Rahm	Bob and Lee are the first gay couple that move to Wisteria Lane. Bob is a lawyer, while Lee is a real estate agent.	2004–2012
Desperate Housewives	ABC	Katherine Mayfair	Dana Delany	Katherine is bisexual, and moves to Paris with Robin, an ex-stripper. She later moves back to Wisteria Lane, after becoming a successful businesswoman.	2004–2012
Desperate Housewives	ABC	Robin Gallagher	Julie Benz	Robin is a lesbian, who quits her job as a stripper, and moves in with Katherine Mayfair; becomes her lover and moves with her to Paris.	2004–2012
Desperate Housewives	ABC	Glen Wingfield	Richard Chamberlain	Glen is Lynette's stepfather, who finally comes out as gay; revealing the real reason he left her mother 20 years ago.	2004–2012
Entourage	HBO	Lloyd	Rex Lee	Lloyd is gay and the flamboyant but self-assured assistant to highly abrasive super-agent Ari Gold. At the time, Lloyd was one of the few gay Asian Pacific-Islander characters on television. Rex Lee, the actor who portrays Lloyd, is openly gay as well.	2004–2011
Hex	Arena; Sky One	Thelma Bates	Jemima Rooper	Thelma is a lesbian, and gave her life to save Cassie, who she had a crush on. When Cassie dies, they finally get together as ghosts.	2004–2005
Hex	Arena; Sky One	Maya Robertson	Laura Donnelly	Maya is a lesbian, and is killed after being hit by a car.	2004–2005
Hex	Arena; Sky One	Tom Wright	Samuel Collings	Tom is secretly gay and in love with Leon.	2004–2005
House	Fox	"Thirteen" (Dr. Remy Hadley)	Olivia Wilde	"Thirteen" is bisexual and has been shown in relationships with both men and women.	2004–2012
House	Fox	Jackson Smith	Dominic Scott Kay	Jackson is 13 and questioning. He is admitted to the hospital because of his genetic mosaicism, a condition where Jackson was born with male and female DNA and ambiguous genitalia.	2004–2012
House	Fox	Max	Dahlia Salem	Max is a lesbian, and the girlfriend of Hannah, who was suffering from insomnia. Max knew that Hannah was going to leave her, so she got a dog, but it gave Hannah bubonic plague.	2004–2012
House	Fox	Spencer	Angela Gots	Spencer is a lesbian, and has a one-night stand with Thirteen. After having sex, Spencer has a seizure and is admitted to the hospital, seen is episode "Lucky Thirteen".	2004–2012
House	Fox	Amy	Jaclyn Jonet	Amy is a lesbian, and Thirteen's girlfriend at the end of the series. They leave for Greece together but come back for House's funeral.	2004–2012
Jack & Bobby	WB	Jimmy McCallister	Tom Cavanagh	Jimmy is gay, and really has not amounted to much. He drinks a lot, parties a lot, and does not really have a serious job.	2004
Jack & Bobby	WB	Matt Kramer	Patrick J. Adams	Matt is a closeted gay, who comes out to his friend Jack (Matt Long), who he has a secret crush on. He later commits suicide without telling anyone why, in episode "The Lost Boys".	2004
The L Word	Showtime	Bette Porter	Jennifer Beals	Bette is a lesbian. She opened an art museum with her college roommate Kelly Wentworth, where she was the director. She was in a relationship for seven years with Tina, prior to the show's beginning.	2004-2009
The L Word	Showtime	Dana Fairbanks	Erin Daniels	Dana was a lesbian, funny and likable. During season 3, she develops breast cancer and dies, in episode "Losing the Light". According to Ilene Chaiken, killing off Dana was the one thing that she regretted. She said the audience never forgave her for it, and it's the one thing that she maybe would change if she could go back and change anything.	2004-2009
The L Word	Showtime	Marina Ferrer	Karina Lombard	Marina is bisexual and the owner of the hangout spot, The Planet, seen in season one. She has an affair with Jenny while Jenny is still in a relationship with her boyfriend. Marina is also in a long term open relationship with her girlfriend, Francesca.	2004-2009
The L Word	Showtime	Tina Kennard	Laurel Holloman	Tina is bisexual, and is Bette Porter's long-term on-and-off partner, before finally getting married. They later divorce, but remain on good terms because of their daughter Angie.	2004-2009
The L Word	Showtime	Shane McCutcheon	Katherine Moennig	Shane is a lesbian, and a successful owner of a chain of hair salons. She was formerly a vagrant, crashing on her friends couches and in other people's beds as often as she could, before she became successful. She has slept with men for money in the past.	2004-2009
The L Word	Showtime	Alice Pieszecki	Leisha Hailey	Alice lives in Los Angeles, California, and mostly hangs out in West Hollywood. During the first seasons, she is often seen with her best friends, Shane McCutcheon and Dana Fairbanks.	2004-2009
The L Word	Showtime	Jenny Schecter	Mia Kirshner	Jenny is bisexual and the most hated character on the show, due to her dark and destructive ways. In the series finale, she is killed off when she is found floating face-down in Bette and Tina's swimming pool. Sergeant Marybeth Duffy (Lucy Lawless) is brought in to investigate her death, and the series ends with all of the friends going to the police station to make their statements.	2004-2009
The L Word	Showtime	Jodi Learner	Marlee Matlin	Jodi is a lesbian, and a deaf artist who teaches at the university, where Bette is the Dean of. They eventually end up having an affair.	2004-2009
The L Word	Showtime	Carmen de la Pica Morales	Sarah Shahi	Carmen is a lesbian and was engaged to Shane, but started on the show in a relationship with Jenny.	2004-2009
The L Word	Showtime	Cherie Jaffe	Rosanna Arquette	Cherie, also known as Cherie Peroni, is bisexual. At one time, she was married to Steve, and she also had an affair with Shane,	2004-2009
The L Word	Showtime	Molly Kroll	Clementine Ford	Molly is bisexual and Phyllis' daughter. She had a crush on Shane and later slept with her. Clementine Ford, the actress who portrays Molly, is the daughter of Cybill Sheperd, who plays her mother Phyliss in the show.	2004-2009
The L Word	Showtime	Moira/Max Sweeney	Daniel Sea	Max is a bisexual trans man. He transitioned with grey market male hormones and no medical assistance. He has a relationship with Jenny Schecter through most of the third season.	2004-2009
The L Word	Showtime	Tasha Williams	Rose Rollins	Tasha is a lesbian and an Army National Guard Captain and a Military Police officer, she eventually gets kicked out under Don't ask, don't tell. She is Alice's girlfriend for seasons 4–6.	2004-2009
The L Word	Showtime	Lara Perkins	Lauren Lee Smith	Lara is a lesbian, and a soup chef. She was Dana's girlfriend for a short period of time.	2004-2009
The L Word	Showtime	Phyllis Kroll	Cybill Shepherd	Phyllis is a lesbian, and Molly's mother. She has an on-again/off-again relationship with her divorce attorney, Joyce. Cybill Sheperd, the actress who plays Phyliss, is the mother of actress Clementine Ford, who portrays her daughter Molly in the show.	2004-2009
The L Word	Showtime	Nadia Karella	Jessica Capshaw	Nadia is a lesbian, and was a student in Bette's class at the university She had a crush on Bette and successfully convinced her to hire her as a teacher's assistant. She then aggressively pursued Bette, and they end up having sex in Bette's car.	2004-2009
The L Word	Showtime	Niki Stevens	Kate French	Niki is a lesbian, and a famous movie star who dates Jenny, hooks up with Shane, and has an affair with Paris Hilton. Her character was based on Lindsay Lohan.	2004-2009
The L Word	Showtime	Joyce Wischnia	Jane Lynch	Joyce is a lesbian, and the lawyer for most of the characters on the show. She dated Phyllis off and on since the 70s.	2004-2009
The L Word	Showtime	Paige Sobel	Kristanna Loken	Paige is bisexual and begins a relationship with Shane in season four. They meet after Shane's brother, Shay (Aidan Jarrar), makes friends with her son, Jared (Jackson Allan).	2004-2009
The L Word	Showtime	Helena Peabody	Rachel Shelley	Helena is a spoiled lesbian, and heir to the fictional wealthy Peabody Foundation, who loses it all then gets it all back.	2004-2009
The L Word	Showtime	Adele Channing	Malaya Drew	Adele is bisexual and is Jenny Schecter's personal assistant. She kissed Niki while pretending to be Jenny.	2004-2009
The L Word	Showtime	Catherine Rothberg	Sandrine Holt	Catherine is a lesbian and a professional gambler. She gets involved in a relationship with Helena, seducing her into a world of high stakes betting on poker games and horse races. Helena soon realizes she is being scammed, and snaps, cleaning out Catherine's safe.	2004-2009
The L Word	Showtime	Dylan Moreland	Alexandra Hedison	Dylan is bisexual, and seduces Helena Peabody into having an affair. She then files sexual harassment charges against Helena as a means of extortion. She later develops real feelings for Helena.	2004-2009
The L Word	Showtime	Eva "Papi" Torres	Janina Gavankar	Papi is a lesbian and according to Alice Pieszecki's "chart" (an undirected labeled graph in which nodes represent individuals and lines represent affairs or hookups); Papi has slept with the most characters on the show.	2004-2009
The L Word	Showtime	Kelly Wentworth	Elizabeth Berkley	Kelly is bisexual and is Bette's college roommate. They opened an art gallery together and Kelly tried to seduce Bette, but failed.	2004-2009
The L Word	Showtime	Tonya	Meredith McGeachie	Tonya is a lesbian, and met Dana when she was assigned as Dana's hospitality assistant during a golf tournament. When the tournament was over, she ended up moving in with Dana and appointed herself Dana's manager. After Dana discovered Tonya was skimming 15% off her earnings, they broke up. Tonya then began a relationship with Melissa Rivers (portrayed by herself).	2004-2009
The L Word	Showtime	Peggy Peabody	Holland Taylor	Peggy is a lesbian, and the founder of the Peabody Foundation and mother of Helena. Bette attempts to convince her to lend her collection "Provocations" to the California Art Center, where Bette works. She passes on her fortune and foundation to Helena, and resumes her relationship with her former lover, Marilyn, who she was in a relationship with in 1973. According to co-creator Ilene Chaiken, when production began, the show was called "Earthlings", not "The L Word", but it sounded just too sci-fi, Chaiken said.	2004-2009
The Long Firm	BBC 2	Harry Starks	Mark Strong	Harry is a homosexual East End gangster.	2004
Lost	ABC	Tom Friendly	M. C. Gainey	Tom is revealed to be gay in season 4, and is a member of The Others, who resided on the island before the plane crash.	2004–2010
Lost	ABC	Arturo	Francesco Simone	Arturo is gay, and has a brief fling with Tom Friendly.	2004–2010
Moorat (Eunuch's Wedding)	ARY TV	Reshma	Abid Ali	Moorat is a 33-episode series that tells the story of the trans community in Pakistan. The series focuses on a woman who is engaged to be married, but her fiancée is transgender. The trans woman eventually escapes from her family's strictness, and being shunned, for the love of her intersex friends. The series was directed by Kamran Qureshi.	2004–2005
Moorat (Eunuch's Wedding)	ARY TV	Babra	Kashif Mahmood	Moorat is a 33-episode series that tells the story of the trans community in Pakistan. The series focuses on a woman who is engaged to be married, but her fiancée is transgender. The trans woman eventually escapes from her family's strictness, and being shunned, for the love of her intersex friends. The series was directed by Kamran Qureshi.	2004–2005
Moorat (Eunuch's Wedding)	ARY TV	Bijli	Ehtasham Warsi	Moorat is a 33-episode series that tells the story of the trans community in Pakistan. The series focuses on a woman who is engaged to be married, but her fiancée is transgender. The trans woman eventually escapes from her family's strictness, and being shunned, for the love of her intersex friends. The series was directed by Kamran Qureshi.	2004–2005
Moorat (Eunuch's Wedding)	ARY TV	Chamki	Rashid Farooqi	Moorat is a 33-episode series that tells the story of the trans community in Pakistan. The series focuses on a woman who is engaged to be married, but her fiancée is transgender. The trans woman eventually escapes from her family's strictness, and being shunned, for the love of her intersex friends. The series was directed by Kamran Qureshi.	2004–2005
Moorat (Eunuch's Wedding)	ARY TV	Shola	Mehmood Akhtar	Moorat is a 33-episode series that tells the story of the trans community in Pakistan. The series focuses on a woman who is engaged to be married, but her fiancée is transgender. The trans woman eventually escapes from her family's strictness, and being shunned, for the love of her intersex friends. The series was directed by Kamran Qureshi.	2004–2005
Rescue Me	FX	Mike Silletti	Michael Lombardi	Mike's sexuality throughout the series is ambiguous. He is sexually involved with his gay roommate, receiving oral sex, but never reciprocating. He gets sexually involved with a brother and sister and then self-identifies as bisexual, but later reverts to stating he is heterosexual.	2004–2011
Shameless	Channel 4	Ian Gallagher	Gerard Kearns	Ian is gay, and has been involved with Kash Karib, Sean Bennett, and an ongoing relationship with Micky Maguire.	2004–2013
Shameless	Channel 4	Kash Karib	Chris Bisson	Kash is secretly gay, married, and involved with Ian Gallagher. When Kash's wife finds out, she insists it remain a secret.	2004–2013
Shameless	Channel 4	Jez	Lindsey Dawson	Jez is a lesbian, and owner of the local pub.	2004–2013
Shameless	Channel 4	Monica Gallagher	Annabelle Apsion	Monica is bisexual, and the ex-wife of Frank Gallagher. She left Frank for a lorry driver named Norma Starkey.	2004–2013
Shameless	Channel 4	Norma Starkey	Dystin Johnson	Norma is a lorry driver who is involved with Monica Gallagher.	2004–2013
Shameless	Channel 4	Mickey Macguire	Ciarán Griffiths	Mickey is gay and is in a long-term relationship with Ian Gallagher.	2004–2013
Veronica Mars	UPN; The CW	Seth Rafter	Robert Clark	Seth is an openly gay student at fictional Neptune High. Seth helps in a scheme to bring Tad down, because Tad used to bully him. Tad is blackmailing his girlfriend who wants to break up with him, in episode "M.A.D.".	2004–2007
Veronica Mars	UPN; The CW	Ryan	Bradford Anderson	Ryan is a closeted gay, who runs a website called The Pirates SHIP (Student Homosexual Internet Posting). The website is for closeted students to anonymously communicate with each other. The website gets hacked by blackmailers who threaten to out them unless they pay.	2004–2007
Veronica Mars	UPN; The CW	Marcos Oliveres	Jeremy Ray Valdez	Marcus is gay, and ran the underground radio show Ahoy, Mateys!. Marcos' parents send him to an anti-gay camp.	2004–2007
Veronica Mars	UPN; The CW	Kelly Kuzzio	Lucas Grabeel	Kelly was the closeted gay baseball player, seen in episodes "Versatile Toppings" and "Ahoy Mateys".	2004–2007
Veronica Mars	UPN; The CW	Kylie Marker	Kristin Cavallari	Kylie is a lesbian, and hires Veronica to help protect her from a blackmailer, but it turns out, she was the blackmailer all along.	2004–2007
Veronica Mars	UPN; The CW	Marlena Nichols	Miriam Korn	Marlena is a lesbian, and Kylie's girlfriend.	2004–2007
Veronica Mars	UPN; The CW	Julia Smith	Melissa Leo	Julia is a heterosexual trans woman. She comes down to see her son for 45 seconds a week, never revealing to him that she was his father.	2004–2007
Veronica Mars	UPN; The CW	Selma Hearst Rose	Patty Hearst	Selma is bisexual, and a wealthy heiress and college board trustee. Her husband was blackmailing her, because he caught her with another woman, and he wanted a bigger divorce settlement, in episode "Lord of the Pi's".	2004–2007
Wonderfalls	Fox	Sharon Tyler	Katie Finneran	Sharon inadvertently came out in the first episode.	2004
Wonderfalls	Fox	Beth	Kari Matchett	Beth is bisexual and dated Sharon on and off throughout the series.	2004

=== 2005 ===
Show	Network	Character	Actor	Notes	Year
Beating Heart	MBC	Kim Hae-jung	Harisu	Hae-jung is a trans woman and sibling of lead character Kim Chang-wan.	2005
Bones	Fox	Angela Montenegro	Michaela Conlin	Angela is bisexual, and a genius who invents software to render 3D art. She had a brief relationship with college friend Roxie, but later married Dr. Jack Hodgins.	2005–2017
Bones	Fox	Roxie Lyon	Nichole Hiltz	Roxie is a lesbian, an artist and Angela's ex-girlfriend.	2005–2017
The Book of Daniel	NBC	Peter Webster	Christian Campbell	Peter is a gay medical student, and the son of Daniel (Aidan Quinn), a priest who is addicted to narcotic painkillers. There was some controversy when the show first aired, and it was dropped after four episodes.	2005
The Book of Daniel	NBC	Michael Vaporelli	Danny Mastrogiorgio	Michael is gay, and a member of the mob. After Peter is the victim of three gay bashers, Michael helps Peter's dad Daniel, confront one of them to ask him why. Daniel ends up outraged when the attacker tells him that his "fag son got what he deserved", and punches him in the face; Michael intervenes and tells the punk, "You know who I am. You were never here. You fell. You got that?"	2005
The Book of Daniel	NBC	Victoria Conlin	Cheryl White	Victoria is bisexual and Daniel's sister-in-law. She has a lesbian affair with her deceased husband's secretary. After the secretary disappears, she gets involved with Michael Vaporelli's brother.	2005
Commander in Chief	ABC	Vince Taylor	Anthony Azizi	Vince is gay and HIV-positive and is the chief of staff for the first female President (Geena Davis). The show only ran for one season and received a nomination for GLAAD Outstanding Drama Series.	2005
Criminal Minds	CBS, Paramount+	Campus Patroller	Christopher Mowod	He broke up with his girlfriend because he is gay and wants to date a man named Brian. (S1.E2)	2005-
Criminal Minds	CBS, Paramount+	Maggie Lowe	Katheryn Winnick	She had a twisted obsession and was madly in love with a rising actress named Lila Archer. (S1.E18)	2005-
Criminal Minds	CBS, Paramount+	Pinky Robertson	Jackie Geary	She is a lesbian. (S1.E18)	2005-
Criminal Minds	CBS, Paramount+	Miguel Trejo	Jorge Antonio Pérez	He is a closet gay Mexican man who was accused of murdering his mother and was vindicated soon after. (S1.E19)	2005-
Criminal Minds	CBS, Paramount+	Roberto Gonzalez	Andres Saenz Hudson	He is a bisexual Mexican man who divorced his wife and is now in a secret relationship with Miguel. (S1.E19)	2005-
Criminal Minds	CBS, Paramount+	Peter Chambers	Jamie McShane	He has a daughter and is now in a secret relationship with a man named Glenn Donahue. (S2.E7)	2005-
Doctor Who	BBC	Captain Jack Harkness	John Barrowman	Jack is an omnisexual character from the 51st century. John Barrowman said that the character is "bisexual, but in the realm of the show, we call him omnisexual". Jack was the first openly queer character to appear in the history of Doctor Who.	2005–
Doctor Who	BBC	River Song	Alex Kingston	River is bisexual and was conceived on the TARDIS. She was born Melody Pond, and she has been married 428 times. River was also married to the Doctor. In May 2012, Steven Moffat, one of the writers for the show, stated that River, like Jack, is bisexual.	2005–
Doctor Who	BBC	Madame Vastra	Neve McIntosh	Madame Vastra is a lesbian, and a Silurian detective who marries a human, Jenny Flint. She has been on earth longer than humans.	2005–
Doctor Who	BBC	Jenny Flint	Catrin Stewart	Jenny is a lesbian, and a 19th-century sword fighting Victorian maid who marries Madame Vastra.	2005–
Doctor Who	BBC	Clara Oswald	Jenna Coleman	Clara is bisexual, and describes Jane Austen as a great kisser. She is also set to die in one minute, but since she is time traveling, that minute never comes.	2005–
Doctor Who	BBC	Bill Potts	Pearl Mackie	Bill is a lesbian and the twelfth Doctor's companion. After being shot, she is turned into the first Cyberman. Her liquid alien girlfriend (Heather), returns to save her, by having her brain copied into another liquid alien body.	2005–
Doctor Who	BBC	Thirteenth Doctor	Jodie Whittaker	The Doctor is pansexual, and a Time Lord from the planet Gallifrey, who travels through time and space in her transcendental time machine: the TARDIS.	2005–
Doctor Who	BBC	Cassandra O'Brien	Zoë Wanamaker	Cassandra is a trans woman, and the last human. She was on a space station orbiting Earth in the year 5,000,000,000, set to witness the destruction of the planet by the expansion of the Sun.	2005–
Doctor Who	BBC	Missy (The Master)	Michelle Gomez	Missy is pansexual, and was the Doctor's childhood friend. She was kept prisoner by the Doctor for her crimes. In the end, she was killed by an older version of herself, whom she also killed.	2005–
Doctor Who	BBC	Alonso Frame	Russell Tovey	Alonso is gay, and after meeting Jack Harkness in a bar, he hooked up with him for a one-night stand.	2005–
Eyes	ABC	Chris Didion	Rick Worthy	Chris is a gay African-American, and a senior partner in a high-tech, high-risk investigation firm.	2005
Fingersmith	BBC	Sue Trinder	Sally Hawkins	Sue is a lesbian, and an orphan brought up by pickpockets. She becomes Maud's maid only to try and rob her. It turns out she and Maud were swapped at birth.	2005
Fingersmith	BBC	Maud Lilly	Elaine Cassidy	Maud is a lesbian, who will inherit a fortune when she marries, but through a convoluted set of coincidences and trickery, that is not what happens.	2005
Grey's Anatomy	ABC	Callie Torres	Sara Ramirez	Callie is bisexual, and in a romantic relationship with Erica, until Erica abruptly leaves the hospital. Shortly after, Callie establishes a relationship with Arizona.	2005–
Grey's Anatomy	ABC	Erica Hahn	Brooke Smith	Erica is lesbian, and a cardiothoracic surgeon. She and Callie have sex, which blows Erica's mind, but not Callie's though. Erica was last seen walking into the parking lot.	2005–
Grey's Anatomy	ABC	Arizona Robbins	Jessica Capshaw	Arizona is a lesbian pediatric surgeon. She was previously married to Callie Torres.	2005–
Grey's Anatomy	ABC	Lauren Boswell	Hilarie Burton	Lauren is lesbian, and a craniofacial surgeon. She slept with Arizona during a storm.	2005–
Grey's Anatomy	ABC	Leah Murphy	Tessa Ferrer	Leah is bisexual and was fired for not being fit to be a surgeon. She slept with Arizona for a while.	2005–
Grey's Anatomy	ABC	Joe	Steven W. Bailey	Joe is gay. He's the bartender and owner of the bar that the doctors frequent.	2005–
Grey's Anatomy	ABC	Walter	Jack Yang	Walter is gay and Joe's off-again on-again boyfriend. They end up adopting twins together.	2005–
Grey's Anatomy	ABC	Eliza Minnick	Marika Dominczyk	Eliza is lesbian, and a consultant hired by fictional Grey Sloan Memorial Hospital to revamp their surgical residency program. She has a relationship with Arizona.	2005–
Grey's Anatomy	ABC	Penny Blake	Samantha Sloyan	Penny is lesbian, and the really boring girlfriend of Callie.	2005–
Grey's Anatomy	ABC	Carina DeLuca	Stefania Spampinato	Carina is bisexual, and an OB/GYN. She has relationships with Arizona and Owen.	2005–
Grey's Anatomy	ABC	Casey Parker	Alex Blue Davis	Casey is a trans man and war veteran who a first-year surgical intern.	2005–
Grey's Anatomy	ABC	Levi Schmitt	Jake Borelli	Levi is gay and came out after Nico kissed him in the elevator.	2005–
Grey's Anatomy	ABC	Nico Kim	Alex Landi	Nico is the first openly gay surgeon in the series. He is in a relationship with Levi.	2005–
Grey's Anatomy	ABC	Teddy Altman	Kim Raver	Teddy is bisexual, and has been in a relationship with Owen, and was in a love triangle with Allison and Claire in the past.	2005–
Grey's Anatomy	ABC	Amelia Shepherd	Caterina Scorsone		2005–
Grey's Anatomy	ABC	Kai Bartley	E.R. Fightmaster	Kai is non-binary.	2005–
Grey's Anatomy	ABC	Mika Yasuda	Midori Francis		2005–
Grey's Anatomy	ABC	Taryn Helm	Jaicy Elliot	Taryn is a lesbian, and is a surgical intern, with a crush on Meredith Grey.	2005–
Grey's Anatomy	ABC	Cece Colvin	Caroline Clay	Cece is a lesbian, and is a matchmaker who boasts an 85% success rate. She's had two heart transplants and is waiting on a third.	2005–
Grey's Anatomy	ABC	Aliyah Hamed	Sade Benyaminov	Aliyah is a lesbian. When she learns that her girlfriend, Jessica, is going to be sent to a gay conversion camp by her mother, they attempt suicide by train together. They both survive the impact and are sent to Grey Sloan Memorial.	2005–
Grey's Anatomy	ABC	Donna Gibson	Alexandra Billings	Donna is a trans woman, who is diagnosed with breast cancer while being evaluated for gender reassignment surgery.	2005–
Grey's Anatomy	ABC	Allison Browne	Sherri Saum	Allison is lesbian, and was Teddy's roommate in New York City back in 2001. She also lived with her girlfriend, Clarie, but was having an affair with Teddy behind Claire's back. Allison ends up dying in the September 11 terrorist attacks.	2005–
Grey's Anatomy	ABC	Bex Singleton	Becca Gardner	Bex's sexuality is undefined. She is intersexual, and came in to the hospital with a hormonal imbalance and was found to have a tumor. She was raised as a girl, but at the end of the episode, she was cutting her hair to possibly live as a boy.	2005–
Grey's Anatomy	ABC	Toby Donnelly	Arielle Hader	Toby is non-binary, and they were brought to the hospital after being in a snowmobile accident. Their sexuality is undefined.	2005–
Grey's Anatomy	ABC	Jess	Matt Pascua	Jess is a trans woman, who helps her boyfriend (who is also transitioning) reconcile with his father.	2005–
Inconceivable	NBC	Scott Garcia	David Norona	Scott is a gay attorney who works at the Family Options Fertility Clinic. In the pilot episode, he and his partner Jim have their child.	2005
Inconceivable	NBC	Jim	Jonathan Slavin	Jim is gay and Scott's partner. Actor Jonathan Slaving is out as well.	2005
Noah's Arc	Logo	Noah Nicholson	Darryl Stephens	Noah is gay, and an aspiring screenwriter, who was later hired by Brandy King of Paramount Studios to do a re-write of Wade's scripts "Bait and Switch". He is best friends with Alex, Chance, and Ricky.	2005–2006
Noah's Arc	Logo	Alex Kirby	Rodney Chester	Alex is gay, and works as a counselor at the HIV Treatment and Prevention Center until quitting, and opens his own non-profit HIV-awareness treatment center called "Black Aids Institute".	2005–2006
Noah's Arc	Logo	Ricky Davis	Christian Vincent	Ricky is gay, and the owner of a men's clothing store called Trade Analysis. Ricky is sexually promiscuous and has had sex with over 100 guys.	2005–2006
Noah's Arc	Logo	Chance Counter	Doug Spearman	Chance is gay, and an economics professor at a college. Noah's Arc made history as the first American series with a cast of all-Black and gay characters.	2005–2006
Noah's Arc	Logo	Wade Robinson	Jensen Atwood	Wade is gay, and a former screenwriter. He later gets a job at a furniture store as a delivery driver.	2005–2006
Rome	HBO; BBC Two (2005-2007)	Servilia of the Junii	Lindsay Duncan	Servilla is bisexual. She was the wife of Julius Caesar and had a sexual relationship with Octavia.	2005-2007
Rome	HBO; BBC Two (2005-2007)	Octavia of the Julii	Kerry Condon	Servilla is bisexual. She was the wife of Julius Caesar and had a sexual relationship with Octavia.	2005-2007
Sleeper Cell	Showtime	Salim	Omid Abtahi	Salim is a closeted gay member of an Islamic terrorist cell. He has a secret sexual relationship with Jason.	2005–2006
Sleeper Cell	Showtime	Jason	Michael Rady	Jason is gay, and after meeting the terrorist Salim in a health club, he starts a sexual relationship with him.	2005–2006
South of Nowhere	The N	Spencer Carlin	Gabrielle Christian	Spencer is a lesbian, and in a romantic relationship with Ashley Davies.	2005–2008
South of Nowhere	The N	Ashley Davies	Mandy Musgrave	Ashley is bisexual, and in a relationship with Spencer. They eventually move in together.	2005–2008
South of Nowhere	The N	Carmen	Brooke Vallone	Carmen is a lesbian, and was briefly Spencer's girlfriend. She was abusive and crazy jealous.	2005–2008
South of Nowhere	The N	Lily Zee	Michelle Ang	Lily is a lesbian, and working on a documentary about a drive-by shooting. She is friends with Ashley and Spencer.	2005–2008
South of Nowhere	The N	Jonica	Lisa Pace	Jonica is a lesbian, and is constantly flirting with other girls, even though she has a girlfriend.	2005–2008
South of Nowhere	The N	Paige	Angela Sarafyan	Paige is a lesbian, and likes to party, she is into the L.A. party scene, where she thrives.	2005–2008
South of Nowhere	The N	Kelly	Ashley Schneider	Kelly is a lesbian, who tries to seduce Spencer.	2005–2008
Sugar Rush	Channel 4	Kim Daniels	Olivia Hallinan	Kim is a lesbian who is in love with her best friend Sugar. Kim attends a Christian group where she meets Beth and the two begin a brief relationship.	2005–2006
Sugar Rush	Channel 4	Beth	Laura Donnelly	Beth is a lesbian, and meets Kim at a Christian group in the hopes of curing homosexuality. The two begin a brief relationship.	2005–2006
Sugar Rush	Channel 4	Saint	Sarah-Jane Potts	Saint is bisexual and works at a female-orientated sex toy shop, and is also a DJ. She hooks up with Kim and they move in together.	2005–2006
Sugar Rush	Channel 4	Dave	Matthew Vaughan	Dave and David are a gay couple, and the next-door neighbors who immediately befriend Stella. They also have a son Tom.	2005–2006
Sugar Rush	Channel 4	David	Daniel Coonan	Dave and David are a gay couple, and the next-door neighbors who immediately befriend Stella. They also have a son Tom.	2005–2006
Supernatural	The CW	Castiel	Misha Collins	Castiel confesses his love for Dean Winchester to save him, allowing himself to experience a moment of true happiness. However, Dean just watched stoically and did not reciprocate the same feelings. The series was accused of queerbaiting fans with the interactions between Castiel and Dean for a long time.)	2005–2020
Supernatural	The CW	Charlie Bradbury	Felicia Day	Charlie Bradbury is an openly lesbian computer hacker and IT employee who assisted Sam and Dean Winchester in several cases.	2005–2020
Supernatural	The CW	Chuck Shurley	Rob Benedict	Chuck, also known as God, is bisexual.	2005–2020
Supernatural	The CW	Jesse and Cesar Cuevas	Lee Rumohr; Hugo Ateo	Jesse and Cesar are married, and both monster hunters.	2005–2020
Supernatural	The CW	Lily Baker	Jessica Harmon	Lily is a lesbian, and she accidentally killed her girlfriend and was attacked and hung on a windmill by a demon.	2005–2020
Supernatural	The CW	Claire Novak	Kathryn Newton	Claire is lesbian or bisexual, and her first love was Kaia Nieves.	2005–2020
Weeds	Showtime	Sanjay Patel	Maulik Pancholy	Sanjay is gay, and a weed dealer.	2005–2012
Weeds	Showtime	Isabelle Hodes	Allie Grant	Isabelle is the teen daughter of Celia Hodes and openly lesbian. She later has sex reassignment surgery to become a trans man named Bruce.	2005–2012
Weeds	Showtime	Josh Wilson	Justin Chatwin	Josh is a weed dealer, and having a gay affair with an older man.	2005–2012
Weeds	Showtime	Captain Roy Till	Jack Stehlin	Roy and Shlatter are both gay and in a relationship. After Shlatter is tortured and murdered by a gang of drug dealers, Roy vows to get revenge on the gang who killed him, but ends up getting killed himself.	2005–2012
Weeds	Showtime	DEA Agent Shlatter	Andrew Rothenberg	Roy and Shlatter are both gay and in a relationship. After Shlatter is tortured and murdered by a gang of drug dealers, Roy vows to get revenge on the gang who killed him, but ends up getting killed himself.	2005–2012

=== 2006 ===
Show	Network	Character	Actor	Notes	Year
Big Love	HBO	Alby Grant	Matt Ross	Alby is a closeted gay Mormon, scheming to control his polygamous sect. He eventually enters into a secret relationship with Dale Tomasson.	2006–2011
Big Love	HBO	Dale Tomasson	Ben Koldyke	Dale is a closeted gay Mormon, and undergoing reparative therapy to pray away the gay. He begins a secret relationship with Alby, and eventually commits suicide when his secret life is revealed.	2006–2011
Brothers & Sisters	ABC	Kevin Walker	Matthew Rhys	Kevin is a gay attorney and part of a large family.	2006–2011
Brothers & Sisters	ABC	Scotty Wandell	Luke Macfarlane	Scotty is Kevin's husband, who has an affair with another man.	2006–2011
Brothers & Sisters	ABC	Chad Barry	Jason Lewis	Chad is gay and a former love interest for Kevin.	2006–2011
Brothers & Sisters	ABC	Jason McCallister	Eric Winter	Jason is gay, and Kevin's previous boyfriend.	2006–2011
Brothers & Sisters	ABC	Saul Holden	Ron Rifkin	Saul is gay and HIV-positive.	2006–2011
Dexter	Showtime	Isaak Sirko	Ray Stevenson	Sirko was a gay Ukrainian mobster seeking to kill Dexter to avenge the death of Sirko's lover Viktor, whom Dexter had murdered in season 7.	2006–2013
Eureka	Syfy	Vincent	Chris Gauthier	Vincent is gay, and runs the fictional diner Cafe Diem in Eureka.	2006–2012
Friday Night Lights	NBC	Lucy Rodell	Libby Villari	Lucy is lesbian and the mayor of Dillon. Barbara is her partner.	2006–2011
Friday Night Lights	NBC	Barbara Gentry	Eleese Lester	Barbara is lesbian, a lawyer, and the partner of Lucy.	2006–2011
Friday Night Lights	NBC	Devin Boland	Stephanie Hunt	Devin comes out as lesbian to Landry, after he kissed her.	2006–2011
Heroes	NBC	Claire Bennet	Hayden Panettiere	Claire is bisexual, and an evolved human with the power to rapidly heal. She dates her college roommate for a while.	2006–2010
Heroes	NBC	Gretchen Berg	Madeline Zima	Gretchen is bisexual, and Claire's college roommate.	2006–2010
Hotel Babylon	BBC One	Ben Trueman	Michael Obiora	Ben is the flamboyant, openly gay front desk receptionist at the hotel.	2006–2009
The Line of Beauty	BBC	Nick Guest	Dan Stevens	Nick is gay and a scholarship student at Oxford. His friendship with fellow student Toby Fedden (Oliver Coleman), leads to a post-graduation offer that Nick move into the Feddens' London mansion, to work on his thesis project. This series takes place in the 1980s.	2006
The Line of Beauty	BBC	Wani Ouradi	Alex Wyndham	Wani is the closeted son of a Lebanese supermarket chain tycoon. Wani and Nick begin a secret relationship, while Wani supports Nick financially. Nick colludes in Wani's cocaine and sex-fuelled spiral of self-destruction. Wani later contracts AIDS, which ends the relationship.	2006
The Line of Beauty	BBC	Leo Charles	Don Gilet	Leo is gay and is Nick's first lover after arriving to London. They eventually break up, and a few years later, Leo's sister visits Nick to inform him that Leo has died of AIDS. This three part series is an adaptation of the 2004 novel of the same name.	2006
Sinchronicity	BBC Three	Jase	Daniel Percival	Jase is a financial consultant, and has a gay encounter with Mani.	2006
Sinchronicity	BBC Three	Mani	Navin Chowdhry	Mani is a gay Doctor, and gives Jase oral sex.	2006
Sinchronicity	BBC Three	Faye	John Sheahan	Faye is a trans woman, who is awaiting her sex reassignment therapy.	2006
Torchwood	BBC Three; BBC Two; BBC One; Starz	Jack Harkness	John Barrowman	Jack is omnisexual and has also been described as bisexual. Jack is sexually promiscuous, and has sex with many partners throughout the series.	2006–2011
Torchwood	BBC Three; BBC Two; BBC One; Starz	Ianto Jones	Gareth David-Lloyd	Ianto is bisexual, and has a relationship with Jack. Ianto has kept his relationship with Jack secret from his family.	2006–2011
Torchwood	BBC Three; BBC Two; BBC One; Starz	Toshiko Sato	Naoko Mori	Toshiko is bisexual, entering a relationship with an alien named Mary, while also attracted to teammate Owen.	2006–2011
Torchwood	BBC Three; BBC Two; BBC One; Starz	Owen Harper	Burn Gorman	Owen is bisexual, having a threesome with a man and a woman, after spraying them with a magic spray.	2006–2011
Torchwood	BBC Three; BBC Two; BBC One; Starz	Captain John Hart	James Marsters	John is gay, and former colleague and lover of Jack. He was introduced in episode "Kiss Kiss, Bang Bang".	2006–2011
Torchwood	BBC Three; BBC Two; BBC One; Starz	Brad	Dillon Casey	Brad is a gay bartender, who has a one-night stand with Jack, in episode "Dead of Night".	2006–2011
Torchwood	BBC Three; BBC Two; BBC One; Starz	Charlotte Wills	Marina Benedict	Charlotte is lesbian, and a mole pretending to be a CIA watch analyst.	2006–2011
Torchwood	BBC Three; BBC Two; BBC One; Starz	Angelo Colasanto	Daniele Favilli	Angelo is bisexual. He had a tryst with Jack Harkness in the 1920s. Years later he marries a woman and raises a family.	2006–2011
Ugly Betty	ABC	Justin Suarez	Mark Indelicato	Justin is gay, and the nephew of Betty.	2006–2010
Ugly Betty	ABC	Marc St. James	Michael Urie	Marc is the openly gay personal assistant of the fashion editor at MODE magazine.	2006–2010
Ugly Betty	ABC	Alexis Meade	Rebecca Romijn	Alexis is a trans woman and the sibling of lead character Daniel.	2006–2010
Ugly Betty	ABC	Cliff St. Paul	David Blue	Cliff is a fashion photographer and Marc's boyfriend in season two.	2006–2010
Ugly Betty	ABC	Austin	Ryan McGinnis	Austin and Justin begin a relationship in the final episodes of the series.	2006–2010
Waterloo Road	BBC1	Jo Lipsett	Sarah-Jane Potts	Jo is an openly gay French teacher.	2006–2015
Waterloo Road	BBC1	Ros McCain	Sophie McShera	Ros is lesbian, and a student, who falls for her teacher Jo.	2006–2015
Waterloo Road	BBC1	Matt Wilding	Chris Geere	Matt Wilding is a closeted gay, and a music teacher.	2006–2015
Waterloo Road	BBC1	Josh Stevenson	William Rush	Josh is gay, and Tom's son. He comes out after having attractions for his best friend Finn Sharkey.	2006–2015
Waterloo Road	BBC1	Nate Gurney	Scott Haining	Nate is an openly gay teenager, with romantic connections to Josh.	2006–2015
Waterloo Road	BBC1	Nikki Boston	Heather Peace	Nikki is a lesbian teacher at the school.	2006–2015
Waterloo Road	BBC1	Lorraine Donnegan	Daniela Denby-Ashe	Lorraine is a lesbian, and philanthropist and businesswoman.	2006–2015
Waterloo Road	BBC1	Colin Scott	Chris Finch	Colin is gay, and works for a capital management company and is the boyfriend of Matt Wilding.	2006–2015
Waterloo Road	BBC1	Vix Spark	Kristin Atherton	Vix is a lesbian, and has a homemade jewellery business. She and Nikki leave to be together.	2006–2015

=== 2007 ===
Show	Network	Character	Actor	Notes	Year
Army Wives	Lifetime	Nicole Galassini	Kellie Martin	Nicole is lesbian and an Army intelligence captain. Nicole eventually proposes to Charlie	2007–2013
Army Wives	Lifetime	Charlie Mayfield	Ryan Michelle Bathe	Charlie is lesbian and the civilian partner of Nicole.	2007–2013
The Best Years	Global	Lee Campbell	Alan Van Sprang	Lee is bisexual and is HIV-positive. He owns the local hot spot nightclub Colony.	2007–2009
Damages	FX; Audience	Ray Fiske	Željko Ivanek	Fiske was closeted and concealing a relationship with a witness in a court case. After he is outed, he commits suicide.	2007–2012
Dirt	FX	Leo Spiller	Will McCormack	Leo is bisexual and the brother of lead character Lucy Spiller (Courteney Cox).	2007–2008
Dirt	FX	Lucy Spiller	Courteney Cox	Lucy is bisexual and is the editor-in-chief of the fictional magazine DirtNow, a trashy tabloid.	2007–2008
Dirt	FX	Jack Dawson	Grant Show	Jack is married, and a closeted gay action movie star who has a short tryst with Leo.	2007–2008
Dirt	FX	Garbo	Carly Pope	Garbo is lesbian and a drug dealer.	2007–2008
Dirt	FX	Julia Mallory	Laura Allen	Julia is bisexual, and has a sexual relationship with Garbo.	2007–2008
Dirt	FX	Willa McPherson	Alexandra Breckenridge	Willa is a lesbian, and a reporter for the tabloid. She takes drugs, has one night stands, and befriends the mentally unstable, all to get the story.	2007–2008
Dirty Sexy Money	ABC	Carmelita	Candis Cayne	Carmelita is a trans woman, and a prostitute having an affair with Patrick Darling IV (William Baldwin), a United States Senate candidate. She is eventually killed in a revenge plot. Candis Cayne came out as transgender in 1996, and her role as Carmelita, makes Cayne the first transgender actress to play a recurring transgender character in primetime.	2007–2008
Gossip Girl	The CW	Eric van der Woodsen	Connor Paolo	Eric is gay, and had relationships in the series with Asher, Jonathan, and Elliot. The series is based on the novel series of the same name written by Cecily von Ziegesar.	2007–2012
Gossip Girl	The CW	Harold Waldorf	John Shea	Harold is gay, and after his divorce, he left for France with his boyfriend Roman.	2007–2012
Gossip Girl	The CW	Roman	William Abadie	Roman is gay, and Harold's boyfriend.	2007–2012
Gossip Girl	The CW	Asher Hornsby	Jesse Swenson	Asher is gay, and was Eric's first sexual encounter with a male. They kept their relationship secret, because they were both in the closet at the time.	2007–2012
Gossip Girl	The CW	Jonathan Whitney	Matt Doyle	Jonathan is gay, and was Eric's first boyfriend. Their friends and family were very supportive of their relationship.	2007–2012
Gossip Girl	The CW	Josh Ellis	Neal Bledsoe	Josh is gay, and shares a kiss with Chuck.	2007–2012
Gossip Girl	The CW	Elliot Leichter	Luke Kleintank	Elliot is bisexual and Eric's brief love interest.	2007–2012
Greek	ABC Family	Calvin Owens	Paul James	Calvin is secretly gay when he arrives at college, but eventually comes out. He had a relationship with Heath on and off throughout the series, and at the end of the series, went to India with him.	2007–2011
Greek	ABC Family	Heath Anderson	Zack Lively	Heath is openly gay, and had several one night stands with Calvin. By the end of the series, Heath and Calvin are in a committed relationship and going to India together.	2007–2011
Greek	ABC Family	Michael	Max Greenfield	Michael is gay, and an older love interest of Calvin's for a few episodes.	2007–2011
Greek	ABC Family	Grant Ellis	Gregory Michael	Grant is gay and Calvin's college roommate. He comes out to Calvin, and at first is in a secret relationship with him.	2007–2011
Jekyll	BBC One	Miranda Calendar	Meera Syal	Miranda is a lesbian private investigator.	2007
Jekyll	BBC One	Min	Fenella Woolgar	Min is Miranda's partner and is having their baby.	2007
Mad Men	AMC	Salvatore Romano	Bryan Batt	Sal is a closeted member of the ad agency's art department.	2007–2015
Mad Men	AMC	Carol	Kate Norby	Carol is lesbian, and in love with her roommate Joan.	2007–2015
Mad Men	AMC	Joyce	Zosia Mamet	Joyce is a lesbian friend of Peggy's.	2007–2015
Mad Men	AMC	Kurt	Edin Gali	Kurt is gay, and an art director with the agency.	2007–2015
Mad Men	AMC	Bellhop	Orestes Arcuni	The bellhop is gay, and has a one-night stand with Sal while he's on a business trip, until a fire in the hotel interrupts them.	2007–2015
Mad Men	AMC	Bill Hartley	Matthew Glave	Bill is a closeted gay executive at GM. He gets arrested for offering a blow job to an undercover officer, Hartley is badly beaten and humiliated by the police.	2007–2015
Mad Men	AMC	Kenneth	Anthony Gioe	Kenneth and Hugh are a gay couple that Don encounters when he goes looking for an old girlfriend; they now live in the apartment where she used to live.	2007–2015
Mad Men	AMC	Hugh	Scot Zeller	Kenneth and Hugh are a gay couple that Don encounters when he goes looking for an old girlfriend; they now live in the apartment where she used to live.	2007–2015
Notruf Hafenkante	ZDF	Melanie Hansen	Sanna Englund	Melanie and Helen are a lesbian couple. Melanie is a police officer, and Helen is an anesthesiologist at the hospital.	2007–
Notruf Hafenkante	ZDF	Helen Anneza	Dennenesch Zoudé	Melanie and Helen are a lesbian couple. Melanie is a police officer, and Helen is an anesthesiologist at the hospital.	2007–
Pushing Daisies	ABC	The Coroner	Sy Richardson	The coroner is gay and has a crush on Emerson Cod (Chi McBride).	2007–2009
Skins	E4	Maxxie Oliver	Mitch Hewer	Maxxie is a gay teenager who is proficient at several styles of dance.	2007–2013
Skins	E4	Tony Stonem	Nicholas Hoult	Tony is bisexual, and has sexual relations with female characters and gay characters throughout the series.	2007–2013
Skins	E4	Cassie Ainsworth	Hannah Murray	Cassie is bisexual and has anorexia nervosa, low self-esteem, suicidal thoughts, and drug addiction.	2007–2013
Skins	E4	Dale	Matthew Hayfield	Dale is a closeted gay, and one of Maxxie's bullies. Maxxie finds out he is gay when Dale chases him down and they share a passionate kiss.	2007–2013
Skins	E4	Emily Fitch	Kathryn Prescott	Emily is a lesbian college student, and has an identical twin sister, Katie.	2007–2013
Skins	E4	Naomi Campbell	Lily Loveless	Naomi is a lesbian and Emily's girlfriend. They are in a committed relationship.	2007–2013
Skins	E4	Franky Fitzgerald	Dakota Blue Richards	Franky is an androgynous pansexual, and super-intelligent. She was bullied as a younger girl, and it affects pretty much everything she does.	2007–2013
Skins	E4	Alex Henley	Sam Jackson	Alex is gay.	2007–2013
The Tudors	Showtime; BBC; CBC	Thomas Tallis	Joe Van Moyland	Thomas has a gay romp with a courtier, and a relationship with nobleman William Compton.	2007–2010
The Tudors	Showtime; BBC; CBC	William Compton	Kristen Holden-Ried	William is closeted and in a secret relationship with Thomas Tallis.	2007–2010
The Tudors	Showtime; BBC; CBC	George Boleyn	Pádraic Delaney	George is gay, and has a relationship with Mark Smeaton.	2007–2010
The Tudors	Showtime; BBC; CBC	Mark Smeaton	David Alpay	Mark is the gay court musician, and is involved with George Boleyn.	2007–2010

=== 2008 ===
Show	Network	Character	Actor	Notes	Year
90210	The CW	Teddy Montgomery	Trevor Donovan	Teddy is gay, and has several partners during the show's run.	2008–2013
90210	The CW	Shane	Ryan Rottman	Shane is gay and has a relationship with Teddy Montgomery.	2008–2013
90210	The CW	Ian	Kyle Riabko	Ian is gay and has a relationship with Teddy Montgomery.	2008–2013
90210	The CW	Marco Salazar	Freddie Smith	Marco is gay and has a relationship with Teddy Montgomery.	2008–2013
90210	The CW	Tripp Willinson	Alan Ritchson	Tripp is gay and has a relationship with Teddy Montgomery.	2008–2013
90210	The CW	Adrianna Tate-Duncan	Jessica Lowndes	Adrianna is bisexual.	2008–2013
90210	The CW	Gia Mannetti	Rumer Willis	Gia is a lesbian.	2008–2013
Being Human	BBC Three	Carl	Steve John Shepherd	Carl is a gay vampire. He shares a flat with his human boyfriend Dan until he accidentally kills him.	2008–2013
Being Human	BBC Three	Dan	Edward Franklin	Dan is gay and is accidentally killed by his vampire boyfriend.	2008–2013
B.J. Fletcher: Private Eye	Web series	B.J. Fletcher	Lindy Zucker	B.J. Fletcher is a lesbian, and runs her own private investigator firm. Her girlfriend is Georgia Drew.	2008–2012
B.J. Fletcher: Private Eye	Web series	Georgia Drew	Dana Puddicombe	Georgia is a lesbian, and a bartender. Her girlfriend is B.J.	2008–2012
B.J. Fletcher: Private Eye	Web series	Jenna Watson	Vanessa Dunn	Jenna is a lesbian, and a politician's daughter.	2008–2012
B.J. Fletcher: Private Eye	Web series	Marjorie Matlock	Natasha Gordon	Marjorie is a lesbian, and B.J.'s ex-girlfriend.	2008–2012
Cashmere Mafia	ABC	Caitlin Dowd	Bonnie Somerville	Caitlin is bisexual, and dated Alicia, a lesbian, for a number of episodes.	2008
Cashmere Mafia	ABC	Alicia Lawson	Lourdes Benedicto	Alice is a lesbian, and dated Caitlin for a while.	2008
Física o Química (Physics or Chemistry)	Antena 3	Fernando "Fer" Redondo	Javier Calvo	Fer is gay and falls for David, the new soccer player at the school.	2008–2011
Física o Química (Physics or Chemistry)	Antena 3	David Ferrán	Adrián Rodríguez	David is gay and has a relationship with Fer which becomes an emotional roller coaster ride for both characters over several seasons.	2008–2011
Hvaler (Maria)	TV 2	Lone	Lisa Loven	Lone and Heidi are a lesbian couple and the two eventually move to Cape Town together.	2008–2010
Hvaler (Maria)	TV 2	Heidi	Kaia Varjord	Lone and Heidi are a lesbian couple and the two eventually move to Cape Town together.	2008–2010
In Treatment	HBO	Jesse	Dane DeHaan	Jesse is 16 and gay, has had multiple partners, and feels unwanted by his adopted parents.	2008–2010
Legend of the Seeker	Syndicated	Cara Mason	Tabrett Bethell	Cara is bisexual.	2008–2010
Legend of the Seeker	Syndicated	Dahlia	Laura Brent	Dahlia is a lesbian, and was killed after being touched by a confessor.	2008–2010
Murdoch Mysteries	CBC	Dr. Emily Grace	Georgina Reilly	Emily is bisexual. She was in a relationship with George Crabtree and dated Leslie Garland. In Season 8 episode "High Voltage", she meets suffragette Lillian Moss; and thereafter falls in love with her.	2008–
The No. 1 Ladies' Detective Agency	HBO	BK	Desmond Dube	BK is gay and the owner of the fictional Last Chance Hair Saloon.	2008–2009
Raising the Bar	TNT	Charlie Sagansky	Jonathan Scarfe	Charlie is a closeted gay and a law clerk working for a powerful female judge.	2008–2009
Raw	RTÉ Two; RTÉ One	Geoff Mitchell	Damon Gameau	Geoff is openly gay and works at a restaurant with his boyfriend and workmate, Pavel.	2008–2013
Raw	RTÉ Two; RTÉ One	Pavel Rebien	Kryštof Hádek	Pavel is gay and works at the same restaurant as his boyfriend, Geoff.	2008–2013
The Secret Life of the American Teenager	ABC Family	Griffin	Brando Eaton	Griffin is an openly gay ninth grader, and goes out on a blind date with Peter.	2008–2013
The Secret Life of the American Teenager	ABC Family	Peter	Kristopher Higgins	Peter is a gay teenager, and goes out on a blind date with Griffin.	2008–2013
The Secret Life of the American Teenager	ABC Family	Anne Juergens	Molly Ringwald	Anne is a lesbian.	2008–2013
The Secret Life of the American Teenager	ABC Family	Nora Underwood	Anne Ramsay	Nora is bisexual.	2008–2013
The Secret Life of the American Teenager	ABC Family	Willadean	Diane Farr	Willadean is lesbian, and Anne's ex-girlfriend, and Nora's AA sponsor.	2008–2013
Sons of Anarchy	FX	June Stahl	Ally Walker	June is bisexual, and an AFT agent. She gets shot in the back of the head and killed.	2008–2014
Sons of Anarchy	FX	Amy Tyler	Pamela J. Gray	Amy is lesbian, and an AFT Agent. She is killed by her ex-girlfriend, June, to be framed for murder.	2008–2014
Sons of Anarchy	FX	Venus Van Dam	Walton Goggins	Venus Van Dam is a trans woman prostitute, and shares a kiss with Tig.	2008–2014
Sons of Anarchy	FX	Alexander "Tig" Trager	Kim Coates	Tig develops an interest in Venus Van Dam, shares a kiss with her, and tells Venus in the final season of the show, "You see all the bad in me but love me regardless; I've never had that and I want to be with you."	2008–2014
Sons of Anarchy	FX	Venus Bell	Jazzmun	Venus is a trans woman drug dealer.	2008–2014
True Blood	HBO	Lafayette Reynolds	Nelsan Ellis	Lafayette is a gay short-order cook, drug dealer and sex worker. He's in a relationship with Jesús Velásquez, and later starts a relationship with a vampire named James.	2008–2014
True Blood	HBO	Tara Thornton	Rutina Wesley	Tara is a lesbian vampire and Lafayette's cousin. She is killed off by a Hep-V vampire.	2008–2014
True Blood	HBO	Jason Stackhouse	Ryan Kwanten	Jason is shown to have multiple gay sex dreams about men, and in one episode, gay vampire Lafayette got Jason to strip dance in his briefs.	2008–2014
True Blood	HBO	Eric Northman	Alexander Skarsgård	Eric Northman is a pansexual vampire and the sheriff of the vampires in his town. He has multiple relations with men.	2008–2014
True Blood	HBO	Eddie Gautier	Stephen Root	Eddie is a gay vampire and former accountant, one of Lafeyette's clients.	2008–2014
True Blood	HBO	Steve Newlin	Michael McMillian	Steve is gay and starts out as the leader of an anti-vampire Christian ministry. After he is made a vampire, he comes out to Jason Stackhouse as a "gay vampire American".	2008–2014
True Blood	HBO	Jesus Velasquez	Kevin Alejandro	Jesus is gay and Lafayette's boyfriend. He is a nurse at the retirement home where Lafayette's mother lives and a brujo (male witch).	2008–2014
True Blood	HBO	Russell Edgington	Denis O'Hare	Russell is gay, and the manipulative, angry, vampire king of Mississippi who killed without abandon.	2008–2014
True Blood	HBO	Talbot Angelis	Theo Alexander	Talbot is a gay vampire, and was the partner of Russell Edgington. He was seduced and then murdered by Eric Northman.	2008–2014
True Blood	HBO	Pam Ravenscroft	Kristin Bauer van Straten	Pam is a bisexual vampire, and second-in-command and co-owner of Fangtasia, a vampire bar.	2008–2014
True Blood	HBO	David Finch	John Prosky	David is a politician and an occasional sex client of Lafayette's.	2008–2014
True Blood	HBO	Nan Flanagan	Jessica Tuck	Nan is bisexual and the official American Vampire League spokesperson.	2008–2014
True Blood	HBO	Nora Gainesborough	Lucy Griffiths	Nora is a bisexual vampire and dies from vampire Hep-V.	2008–2014
True Blood	HBO	Naomi	Vedette Lim	Naomi is a lesbian, and a martial artist who slept with Tara. They broke up over concerns of vampires.	2008–2014
True Blood	HBO	Sophie-Anne Leclerq	Evan Rachel Wood	Queen Sophie is a bisexual vampire, and is killed by a wooden bullet shot by American Vampire League snipers.	2008–2014
True Blood	HBO	Hadley Hale	Lindsey Haun	Hadley is lesbian, and one of the Queen's lovers and a waitress at the faerie nightclub.	2008–2014

=== 2009 ===
Show	Network	Character	Actor	Notes	Year
Being Erica	CBC; SOAPNet	Dave	Bill Turnbull	Dave and Ian are in a committed relationship. Beginning in season 3, the couple purchases the local coffee shop together and are upgraded to series regulars.	2009–2011
Being Erica	CBC; SOAPNet	Ivan	Michael Northey	Dave and Ian are in a committed relationship. Beginning in season 3, the couple purchases the local coffee shop together and are upgraded to series regulars.	2009–2011
Being Erica	CBC; SOAPNet	Dr. Naadiah	Joanne Vannicola	Dr. Naadiah is lesbian, and Tom's therapist, she briefly replaces him as Erica's.	2009–2011
Being Erica	CBC; SOAPNet	Cassidy Holland	Anna Silk	Cassidy is lesbian, and graduate student who was a close friend of Erica's in college.	2009–2011
Caprica	Syfy	Sam Adama	Sasha Roiz	Sam is gay and an assassin for the Tauron mob. Larry is his partner.	2009–2010
Caprica	Syfy	Larry	Julius Chapple	Sam is gay and an assassin for the Tauron mob. Larry is his partner.	2009–2010
FlashForward	ABC	Janis Hawk	Christine Woods	Janis is a closeted lesbian, and an FBI Special Agent, a double agent with the CIA, and also a mole, reporting to those responsible for the blackout.	2009–2010
FlashForward	ABC	Maya	Navi Rawat	Maya is a lesbian, and a chef who briefly dates Janis.	2009–2010
Glee	Fox	Kurt Hummel	Chris Colfer	Kurt is the first gay character to come out in season one of Glee.	2009–2015
Glee	Fox	Blaine Anderson	Darren Criss	Blaine and Kurt start dating and eventually get married.	2009–2015
Glee	Fox	Brittany S. Pierce	Heather Morris	Brittany is an openly bisexual cheerleader.	2009–2015
Glee	Fox	Santana Lopez	Naya Rivera	Santana is a lesbian. She dates Brittany and in season two and comes out to her grandmother.	2009–2015
Glee	Fox	Wade "Unique" Adams	Alex Newell	Unique is a transgender girl.	2009–2015
Glee	Fox	Danielle "Dani"	Demi Lovato	Dani is a lesbian and was Santana Lopez's girlfriend for a while.	2009–2015
Glee	Fox	Adam Crawford	Oliver Kieran-Jones	Adam is gay and Kurt's new love interest while he's living in New York.	2009–2015
Glee	Fox	David Karofsky	Max Adler	Dave is the school bully who picks on the Glee crew, comes out in season two.	2009–2015
Glee	Fox	Quinn Fabray	Dianna Agron	Quinn is bisexual, and exceptionally complex.	2009–2015
Glee	Fox	Cody Tolentino	Bryce Johnson	Cody plays a bisexual Santa Claus in the episode "Previously Unaired Christmas".	2009–2015
Glee	Fox	Hiram Berry	Jeff Goldblum	Hiram and LeRoy Berry are Rachel's fathers. They debuted in episode "Heart"	2009–2015
Glee	Fox	LeRoy Berry	Brian Stokes Mitchell	Hiram and LeRoy Berry are Rachel's fathers. They debuted in episode "Heart"	2009–2015
Glee	Fox	Sebastian Smythe	Grant Gustin	Sebastian is gay and the lead singer of the fictitious Dalton Academy Warblers.	2009–2015
Glee	Fox	Jeremiah	Alexander Nifong	Blaine has a crush on Jeremiah, the assistant manager at a local Gap store. The Warblers accompany Blaine as he serenades Jeremiah with "When I Get You Alone", Jeremiah gets fired and snubs Blaine, in episode "Silly Love Songs".	2009–2015
Glee	Fox	Sandy Ryerson	Stephen Tobolowsky	He is revealed to be gay in season two.	2009–2015
Glee	Fox	Elaine	Kayla Kalbfleisch	Elaine is a lesbian, and appears with Santana and the other cheerleaders.	2009–2015
Glee	Fox	Liz Stevens	Meredith Baxter	Liz and Jan are bisexual, and both Blaine's mentors. They are in a relationship together.	2009–2015
Glee	Fox	Jan	Patty Duke	Liz and Jan are bisexual, and both Blaine's mentors. They are in a relationship together.	2009–2015
Glee	Fox	Spencer Porter	Marshall Williams	A gay football player who has a boyfriend named Alistair.	2009–2015
Glee	Fox	Alistair	Finneas O'Connell	Spencer's boyfriend who joins the glee club.	2009–2015
Glee	Fox	Sheldon Beiste	Dot-Marie Jones	Sheldon is a trans man, making him the first transgender on the show.	2009–2015
The Good Wife	CBS	Kalinda Sharma	Archie Panjabi	Kalinda is bisexual and a private investigator. She has an ex-husband, female lovers, and dates Cary Agos.	2009–2016
The Good Wife	CBS	Lana Delany	Jill Flint	Lana is lesbian and an F.B.I. agent. She has been involved in an on/off relationship with Kalinda for a long time.	2009–2016
The Good Wife	CBS	Sophia Russo	Kelli Giddish	Sophia is bisexual and a private investigator. She has a husband and is lovers with Kalinda.	2009–2016
The Good Wife	CBS	Owen Cavanaugh	Dallas Roberts	Owen is the gay brother of lead character Alicia Florrick.	2009–2016
Kings	NBC	Jack Benjamin	Sebastian Stan	Jack is gay.	2009
Kings	NBC	Joseph Lasile	Michael Arden	Joseph is gay.	2009
Make It or Break It	ABC Family	Max Spencer	Josh Bowman	Max is bisexual.	2009–2012
Melrose Place	The CW	Ella Simms	Katie Cassidy	Ella is bisexual.	2009–2010
Melrose Place	The CW	Caleb Brewer	Victor Webster	Caleb is gay.	2009–2010
Misfits	E4	Greg Adley	Shaun Dooley	Greg is gay.	2009–2013
Misfits	E4	Stuart	Oliver Lansley	Stuart is gay.	2009–2013
Misfits	E4	Melissa	Kehinde Fadipe	Melissa is bisexual.	2009–2013
Misfits	E4	Emma	Hannah Britland	Emma is a lesbian.	2009–2013
The Prisoner	AMC	11-12	Jamie Campbell Bower	11-12 is gay.	2009
The Prisoner	AMC	909	Vincent Regan	909 is gay.	2009
Southland	NBC; TNT	Officer John Cooper	Michael Cudlitz	John is gay.	2009–2013
Stargate Universe	Syfy	Camile Wray	Ming-Na	Camile is a lesbian.	2009–2011
Stargate Universe	Syfy	Sharon	Reiko Aylesworth	Sharon is a lesbian.	2009–2011
Trauma	NBC	Tyler Briggs	Kevin Rankin	Tyler is gay.	2009–2010
United States of Tara	Showtime	Marshall Gregson	Keir Gilchrist	Marshall is gay.	2009–2011
United States of Tara	Showtime	Ted Mayo	Michael Hitchcock	Ted is gay.	2009–2011
United States of Tara	Showtime	Hany	Sammy Sheik	Hany is gay.	2009–2011
United States of Tara	Showtime	Jason	Andrew Lawrence	Jason is possibly gay.	2009–2011
United States of Tara	Showtime	Lionel Trane	Michael Willett	Lionel is gay.	2009–2011
United States of Tara	Showtime	Noah Kane	Aaron Christian Howles	Noah is gay.	2009–2011
The Vampire Diaries	The CW	Bill Forbes	Jack Coleman	Bill is gay.	2009–2017
The Vampire Diaries	The CW	Luke Parker	Chris Brochu	Luke is gay.	2009–2017
The Vampire Diaries	The CW	Mary Louise	Teressa Liane	Mary is a lesbian.	2009–2017
Warehouse 13	Syfy	Helena G. Wells	Jaime Murray	Helena is bisexual.	2009–2014
Warehouse 13	Syfy	Agent Steve Jinks	Aaron Ashmore	Steve is gay.	2009–2014
White Collar	USA	Special Agent Diana Barrigan	Marsha Thomason	Diana is a lesbian.	2009–2014

== See also ==
- Lists of dramatic television series with LGBT characters
- List of lesbian characters in television
- List of gay characters in television
- List of bisexual characters in television
- List of transgender characters in television
- List of fictional asexual characters
- List of fictional intersex characters
- List of fictional non-binary characters
- List of fictional pansexual characters
- List of animated series with LGBT characters
- List of comedy television series with LGBT characters
- List of horror television series with LGBT characters
- List of made-for-television films with LGBT characters
- List of news and information television programs featuring LGBT subjects
- List of reality television programs with LGBT cast members
- List of LGBT characters in radio and podcasts
- List of LGBT characters in soap operas
