= The Penumbra Podcast =

Science fiction and fantasy podcast

- Genre: Fantasy podcast; Science fiction podcast
- Country of origin: United States
- Language: English

Creative team
- Created by: Harley Takagi Kaner Kevin Vibert

Cast and voices
- Hosted by: Harley Takagi Kaner; Kevin Vibert

Production
- Length: 30-50 Minutes

Publication
- No. of seasons: 6
- Original release: March 16, 2016 – Ongoing
- Updates: Bi-weekly

Related
- Related shows: The Bright Sessions; Alice Isn't Dead; Welcome to Night Vale; Wolf 359; The Magnus Archives
- Website: www.thepenumbrapodcast.com

The Penumbra Podcast is an audio drama podcast produced by Harley Takagi Kaner and Kevin Vibert, and distributed by the Rusty Quill Network.

The podcast debuted in March 2016 with the first Juno Steel story and has since released six seasons, encompassing multiple ongoing and concluded storylines. Its narratives feature a wide cast of characters voiced by an ensemble of actors. The show has been noted for its storytelling and LGBTQ+ representation.

The fifth season concluded the Second Citadel storyline on July 2, 2024, and ended regular episodes of the Juno Steel storyline with the season finale on August 20, 2024. In September 2025, the limited-run audiobook If Memory Serves: A Juno Steel Mystery was released exclusively to subscribers.

The sixth season, Thirst, premiered in July 2025 and is currently ongoing.

== Premise ==
The Penumbra Podcast is a narrative fiction podcast that features three primary storylines: The Second Citadel, Juno Steel, and Thirst.

The Second Citadel is set in a fantasy world where humans battle against mind-manipulating monsters. The series follows a large ensemble cast of characters, with a focus on Sir Caroline, the first female Knight of the Crown, as she leads an eclectic team of warriors. Together, they fight to protect their kingdom from increasingly dangerous monsters genetically engineered by their enemies. The story highlights the urgency of growing and diversifying their army of knights before the impending war destroys them all. While The Second Citadel made up only two episodes in the inaugural season, it would receive equal focus to Juno Steel in later seasons.

Juno Steel is a noir-style detective science fiction series set in the distant future on Mars. The series centers on Juno Steel, a sharp-witted private investigator who faces ancient alien artifacts, a mysterious "homme fatale," and his own personal fears: heights, blood, and relationships. Despite his attempts to cling to his misanthropic ways, Juno's life becomes intertwined with a growing list of bizarre yet lovable friends and family.

Thirst is a reality-show-themed horror story that launched in July 2025 as the sixth season of The Penumbra Podcast. Set in the not-so-distant future of the Forty-Seven Habitable States of America, where the news is too terrifying to watch and entertainment reigns supreme, Thirst tells the story of a violent dating competition, Can't Tear My Eyes From You. Contestants in this brutal game are pushed to their limits by a tirelessly cheerful algorithm that designs their challenges, and a sadistic host with a flair for cruelty. The series explores the dark question of whether a cash prize and a safe home away from the rising sea are enough to make the contestants sell their souls for a brutal game with inscrutable goals.

The Penumbra Podcast is directed and sound-designed by Harley Takagi Kaner. Kevin Vibert serves as the lead writer for each episode, with Kaner co-writing certain episodes of The Second Citadel. The show features original music composed by Ryan Vibert, as well as collaborative song work with singer-songwriter Anjimile.

== History ==
The Penumbra Podcast was created in 2016 by Harley Takagi Kaner and Kevin Vibert. The two co-creators met during their undergraduate studies and have continued to work together as a creative team throughout the show's run. Since its inception, The Penumbra Podcast has gained significant momentum and developed a dedicated fanbase. The show is particularly known for its LGBTQ+ representation and for exploring traditional romance tropes through a queer lens. In an interview with WBUR, Kaner reflected on the personal significance of the podcast, saying, "I'm close to my co-creator and people who work on the show... At this point, it's hard to separate 'The Penumbra' from this whole time of my life."

From 2016 to 2018, The Penumbra Podcast collaborated with artist Mikaela Buckley, who created illustrations for the podcast's characters. In her depictions, some characters, most notably Juno Steel, were portrayed as Black. This artistic choice sparked some controversy, as the voice actors for these characters were predominantly White. On September 24, 2021, the podcast issued an official apology for the depictions. In response, merchandise featuring Buckley's artwork was discontinued, though her art remains on the website for archival purposes. The podcast has stated that these depictions became meaningful to many listeners of color.

In 2019 The Penumbra Podcast began working with artist, Sharon Oh to create Juno Steel artwork. They continue to collaborate with Sharon on show artwork. They also worked with Milo Mars on Second Citadel artwork.

In 2022, Harley Takagi Kaner was named one of WBUR's "Makers of Color" and was featured alongside ten emerging artists of color shaping the arts and cultural landscape of Greater Boston. In the feature, Kaner discussed their creative process and their gender identity.

== Reception ==
Zoe Robertson from Book Riot said:

The Penumbra Podcast is an exciting and heart-wrenching chocolate box of a show that celebrates and normalizes diversity and deals with hard-hitting topics in ways that always feel genuine, rather than exploitative, especially considering the wealth of queer characters in its cast. Every performance in the show is impeccable, as is the sound design: I cannot recommend this show enough.

Sarah Baum at The Huff Post said:

If audio dramas are television to your ears, The Penumbra is a Cartoon Network prime time special. Young, fun, fantastical and, most notably, inclusive. The Penumbra Podcast is a must listen...young queer people, people who love podcasts, and anyone with a pulse and Wi-fi.

Melissa Locker of The Guardian called the podcast "a storytelling show that gives classic tales a head-spinning twist".

- 2020 Book Riot labeled it one of "the best fiction podcasts you need to listen to."
- It was ranked number 17 in Tumblr's 2019 list of top web series.
- Audio Verse 2019 Award Winner for: Best Audio Play Production, Best Environmental Sound Design in a Production, Best Writing of an Audio Play Production, Best Performance of a Leading Role in an Audio Play Production, Best performance of a Supporting Role in an Audio Play Production, Best Performance of a Role in an Ensemble Cast for an Audio Play Production
- Audio Verse 2017 Award Winner for: "Best Actress in a Supporting role for an Ongoing, Dramatic, Production", Kate Jones, "Best Actor in a Supporting role for an Ongoing, Dramatic, Production" Noah Simes, and "Best Actor in a Leading role for an Ongoing, Dramatic, Production" went to Joshua Ilon for Juno Steel.
- Audio Verse 2016 "Best New Original, Long Form, Small Cast, Ongoing Production" in 2016.
- Mackenzie Hubbard of The Michigan Daily, said "I've listened to [the podcast] four times and I've cried each time".

== Production ==
The Penumbra Podcast has produced multiple live shows.

- Juno Steel and The Murderous Mask in 2018
- Juno Steel and Train from Nowhere in 2019
- Juno Steel and the Promise Land in 2021
- Juno Steel and The Things We Buried in 2023

== See also ==
- List of LGBT characters in radio and podcasts
- List of LGBT podcasts
