= List of lesbian characters in television =

This is a list of live action lesbian characters in television series (includes terrestrial, cable, and streaming shows). The orientation can be portrayed on-screen, described in the dialogue or mentioned. Roles include lead, main, recurring, supporting, and guest.

The names are organized in alphabetical order by the surname (i.e. last name), or by a single name if the character does not have a surname. Some naming customs write the family name first followed by the given name; in these cases, the names in the list appear under the family name (e.g. Jung Seo-hyun [Korean] is organized alphabetically under "J").

== List ==
=== A–D ===
Character	Portrayed by	Program	Notes	Ref(s)
Simone Abara	Rukiya Bernard	Yellowjackets	Wife of Taissa Turner.	
Greta Adam	Jutta Dolle (de)	Rentnercops (de)	Greta is married to Vicky Adam.	
Viktoria "Vicky" Adam	Katja Danowski (de)	Rentnercops (de)	Vicky is married to Greta Adam with whom she has a son.	
Keeya Adebayo	Elizabeth Ludlow	Peacemaker	Keeya is the wife of Leota Adebayo.	
Leota Adebayo	Danielle Brooks	Peacemaker	A skilled marksman, Leota is the secret daughter of Amanda Waller. She is married to Keeya. Leota used to be a veterinarian and becomes a member of Task Force X.	
Irene Adler	Lara Pulver	Sherlock	A dominatrix who offers her services to men and women. However, although she identifies as a lesbian, she has shown romantic attraction towards Sherlock.	
Iqra Ahmed	Priya Davdra	EastEnders	Iqra is in a relationship with Ash Kaur, and later split apart.	
Nyssa al Ghul	Katrina Law	Arrow	Was in a relationship with Sara Lance. It is also strongly implied her father also passed her up on her inheritance because of her sexuality, and ensuing relationship with Sara.	
Helô Albuquerque	Thaila Ayala	Girls from Ipanema	A journalist. Has an affair with Thereza Soares (bisexual).	
Della Alexander	Michelle Joseph	EastEnders	Della and her girlfriend Binnie Roberts were the first lesbian couple to be featured in EastEnders. Their inclusion was an attempt to portray positive examples of homosexual characters. (Their lesbian kiss accounted for some 45 percent of viewer complaints to the BBC regarding EastEnders in 1994; provoking more complaints than any other television programme that year.	
Alice / Tilly	Rose Reynolds	Once Upon a Time	Reveals her true love is Robin (Zelena's daughter) in episode "The Eighth Witch". She enters into a romantic relationship with Robin.	
Alice	Leah Renee	The Playboy Club	She is a Playboy Bunny in a marriage of convenience with Sean, a gay man.	
Alicia	Naomi Ackie	Master of None	Wife of Denise.	
Alisha	Juliana Harkavy	The Walking Dead	Former girlfriend of Tara Chambler.	
Mariana Almada	Eréndira Ibarra	Las Aparicio	Mariana has always been openly gay. She is in a relationship with Dany, her long-time girlfriend. Later she becomes involved with Julia Aparicio (bisexual).	
Elena Alvarez	Isabella Gomez	One Day at a Time (2017)	In season 1 episode 10, Elena is seen wearing a white suit for her quinces instead of a dress. Earlier in the episode, she comes out to her mother, saying "...I see myself loving a woman".	
Ms. Alvarez	Catherine Lazo	East Los High	School principal. Tries to comfort Jocelyn Reyes when she is outed by sharing her own coming-out experience.	
Luisa Alver	Yara Martinez	Jane the Virgin	A doctor who artificially inseminated Jane, as well as Rafael's sister and an alcoholic who is in love with her stepmother, Rose, with both having an on and off relationship before spending three years together until Rose is found and arrested.	
Frankie Anderson	Katharine Isabelle	Rookie Blue	Frankie is a homicide detective and becomes involved with Gail Peck (season 6). In the series finale episode, she surprises Gail's roommates when she comes out of Gail's bedroom to get a cup of coffee.	
Winter Anderson	Billie Lourd	American Horror Story: Cult	Winter recognizes herself as a lesbian. She had a short relationship with Ivy Mayfair-Richards and later assaults Ally Mayfair-Richards, in a scene in a bathtub.	
Annamaria	Ambra Angiolini	The Ignorant Angels	Michele's friend and Roberta's girlfriend.	
Anne	Hanna van Vliet	Anne+	As Anne becomes involved with women, she discovers something new about herself and learns about life with each experience.	
Ariel ("Ari")	Eden Epstein	Sweetbitter	Ari is a waitress who works at an eatery in Manhattan known as 22 W and likes to gossip.	
Arika	Shivani Ghai	Dominion	A woman who pretends she is someone else than who she really is and even acts like she had a boyfriend, and later she has a girlfriend named Uriel.	
Ayesha	Juliette Motamed	We Are Lady Parts	Ayesha is the drummer in the band We Are Lady Parts and starts a relationship with Zarina, an influencer recruited to promote the band.	
Jojo Baines	Tamzin Malleson	Marcella	Jojo is the partner of Sascha Kyte.	
Lily Baker	Jessica Harmon	Supernatural	Mentions accidentally killing her girlfriend.	
Baldwin (Nadia Fierro)	Sara Serraiocco	Counterpart	An assassin from Earth Prime world (i.e. alternate dimension). She becomes involved with Greta. Baldwin has an affair with her handler, Prime sleeper agent Clare Quayle (bisexual). Her counterpart (i.e. alternate version) Nadia is a violinist from Earth Alpha world, who also has a girlfriend. Baldwin is ordered to kill her Alpha counterpart but doesn't, and Nadia is killed by another Prime agent.	
Regina Barnes	Paula Marshall	Out of Practice	A white E.R. doctor who is infatuated with attractive women.	
Sheryll Barnes	Roxy Sternberg	FBI: Most Wanted	Former NYPD detective, now FBI Special Agent in the Fugitive Task Force. Sheryll is married to Charlotte Gaines and they have a daughter.	
Susanna Barnett	Megan Ketch	Jane the Virgin	A detective. She develops a romance with Dr. Luisa Alver.	
Lena Barnum	Katherine Moennig	Ray Donovan	Lena is a PR agent who was once involved with a woman named Jeannie.	
Josephine Barry	Deborah Grover	Anne with an E	Aunt Josephine had a long-term partner, Gertrude (now deceased).	
Kate Bashwa	Supinder Wraich	Private Eyes	An investigative reporter and girlfriend of officer Danica Powers.	
Thelma Bates	Jemima Rooper	Hex	A woman who is the ghost of Cassandra "Cassie" Hughes's best friend and is in love with her.	
Fran Baxter	Sharon Duncan-Brewster	Years and Years	Girlfriend of Edith Lyons. Asked Edith to live with her.	
Beatrice	Kristina Tonteri-Young	Warrior Nun	A nun in the Order of the Cruciform Sword who comes out as "gay" and confesses her love for the Warrior Nun, Ava Silva.	
Becca	Alison Wandzura	An Unexpected Christmas	A single mom and the sister of Jamie.	
Della Bedford	Jayne Atkinson	Bluff City Law	Comes out after she ends her 15-year marriage.	
Ayanna Bell	Danielle Moné Truitt	Law and Order: Organized Crime	Sgt. Bell is Elliot Stabler's partner. She has a wife and son.	
Alma Beltran	Elise Bauman	Under the Christmas Tree	Alma is the daughter of the land owners that have on their property the Christmas tree Charlie Freemont has been searching for. She becomes flustered when she first meets Charlie.	
Judge Lisa Benner	Marg Helgenberger	All Rise	Lisa waited until same-sex marriage became legal to implement Wedding Day at the courthouse. She had been in a four-year relationship when her girlfriend left her on that special day (season 1, episode 5, "Devotees in the Courthouse of Love").	
Cam Bentland	Lily Gladstone	Under the Bridge	Cam is an Indigenous police officer. She navigates systemic bias while rekindling a romantic connection with journalist Rebecca Godfrey.	
Diana Berrigan	Marsha Thomason	White Collar	A trained FBI agent.	
Grace Billets	Amy Aquino	Bosch	Grace has an affair with a female colleague in the LAPD, Kizmin Rider. She is a lieutenant and supervisor of Harry Bosch, at the Hollywood Station.	
Sarah Bishop	Alex Kingston	A Discovery of Witches	Sarah is a witch and she is the partner of Emily Mather.	
Carrie "Big Boo" Black	Lea DeLaria	Orange Is the New Black	She fell for Linda Ferguson.	
Maggie Blackamoor	David Walliams	Little Britain	She is a woman who is in a relationship with Judy.	
Denny Blood	Alicya Eyo	Bad Girls	Has an on/off relationship with Shell Dockley, before dating fellow prisoner Shaz Wiley.	
Esther Bloom	Jazmine Franks	Hollyoaks	She is in a relationship with another woman named Tilly Evans.	
Cheryl Blossom	Madelaine Petsch	Riverdale	After going to see Love, Simon with Toni Topaz, she admits that she previously loved a friend named Heather when she was in junior high. In 2x17, Cheryl and Toni kiss. In episode 3x12, Cheryl self-identifies as lesbian. (Petsch initially said that Cheryl was "still figuring out what her sexuality is" and thought her to be bisexual; she later revised her opinion and described Cheryl as "definitely a lesbian".)	
Peri Boudreaux	Adriyan Rae	Light as a Feather	Dating Alex Portnoy.	
Shelley Bower	Alexandra Wescourt	Brookside	She kisses another girl named Lindsey Corkhill.	
Charlie Bradbury	Felicia Day	Supernatural	Reveals that she is a lesbian in her first episode, stating she cannot flirt her way past a guard as he is not a girl. She later kisses Gilda and flirts with a girl at her LARPing tournament; and later develops a crush on Dorothy Baum.	
Virginia Braithwaite	Julie Graham	At Home with the Braithwaites	Virginia had a long-term affair with Tamsin and was infatuated with Megan Hartnoll.	
Amy Breslin	Heléne Yorke	The Good Fight	Her partner is Maia Rindell.	
Brigitte	Martina Navratilova	The Politician	Horse trainer. Has an affair with Georgina Hobart (bisexual).	
Robin Buckley	Maya Hawke	Stranger Things	Comes out to her friend Steve Harrington when he tells Robin that he has a crush on her. Robin is the first non-straight character to be included in the series.	
Brunhilda	Brittney Powell	Xena: Warrior Princess	She fell in love with Gabrielle in the season 6 episode "The Rheingold".	
Judy Bryant	Betty Bobbitt	Prisoner	A woman who went through emotions and experiences in a detention center.	
Louise Bryant	Kristen Sieh	Boardwalk Empire	While Louise's sexuality is not explicitly stated, the only romantic/sexual relationship she has on-screen is with a woman.	
Denise Bullock	Keren Dukes	Law and Order: Organized Crime	Lawyer and wife of Ayanna Bell.	
Susan Bunch	Jessica Hecht	Friends	Wife of Carol Willick. They marry in episode "The One with the Lesbian Wedding".	
Calliope "Cal" Burns	Imani Lewis	First Kill	Calliope is a monster hunter who becomes romantically involved with vampire Juliette Fairmont.	
Samantha Burns	Karen Holness	Travelers	Physicist in a relationship with Amanda Myers. Designed the singularity engine with Myers.	
Delia Busby	Kate Lamb	Call the Midwife	In a romantic relationship with nurse Patsy Mount.	
Kimberley "Kim" Butterfield	Daisy Wood-Davis	Hollyoaks	She has a relationship with a woman named Esther Bloom.	
Mary Jo Cacciatore	Frankie Shaw	Blue Mountain State	Shown in Season 3 as a lesbian. (Executive producer Eric Falconer said that they "decided to change things up" for her and other characters and make fun of "the fact that sexual orientation can change so quickly for college students.")	
Helena Cain	Michelle Forbes	Battlestar Galactica	An admiral who had a short-run in the series.	
Calamity Jane	Robin Weigert	Deadwood	Jane returns the affection and physical interest that Joanie Stubbs reveals towards her.	
Calamity Jane	Robin Weigert	Deadwood: The Movie	The movie is set 10 years later, in 1889, during which time she and Joanie became estranged. Jane returns to Deadwood with the hope of winning Joanie back. They rekindle their relationship. (The character is based on American Old West historical figure Calamity Jane (born Martha Jane Cannary).	
Alice Calvert	Samantha Mathis	Under the Dome	In a relationship with Carolyn Hill.	
Camila	Jessica Marie Garcia	Diary of a Future President	Camila is closeted and a friend of Elena's widowed mother, Gabriela "Gabi" Cañero-Reed. She is scared to come out to her parents and say that she has a girlfriend.	
Valeria Camili	Giulia Bevilacqua	È arrivata la felicità	In a relationship with Rita Nardellli.	
Camille	Sirita Wright	195 Lewis	Girlfriend of Yuri.	
Naomi Campbell	Lily Loveless	Skins	Feigns attraction to males before coming out as Emily's girlfriend, and self-identifies as a lesbian.	
Spencer Carlin	Gabrielle Christian	South of Nowhere	Struggles with her sexual orientation throughout season 1, with Carmen as her recurring love interest, before eventually concluding that she wasn't straight and entered a relationship with, and later married, Ashley Davies (bisexual).	
Wendy Carr	Anna Torv	Mindhunter	Wendy is a psychologist and educator at a Boston university, and was in a relationship with Dr. Annaliese Stilman, the head of her department, until she accepted work as a behavioral science consultant for the FBI.	
Tammy Cashman	Melora Hardin	Transparent	College friend of Sarah, they reunite and marry.	
Alice Cassini	Bridget Turner	Doctor Who	Partner of May Cassini (season 3, episode 3).	
May Cassini	Georgine Anderson	Doctor Who	Partner of Alice Cassini (season 3, episode 3).	
Tina Carter	Luisa Bradshaw-White	EastEnders	A short-lived character who has an abusive ex-girlfriend, Tosh Mackintosh. She once kissed Sonia Fowler.	
Silvia Castro	Marián Aguilera	Los hombres de Paco	In a relationship with Pepa.	
Tara Chambler	Alanna Masterson	The Walking Dead	Introduced as the first lesbian character on The Walking Dead. Tara was in a relationship with Alisha, who dies during an attack on the prison. Her next lover, Denise Cloyd, is also killed.	
Maxine "Max" Chapman	Chanté Adams	A League of Their Own	A talented pitcher with a fastball who is stopped from trying out for a girl's baseball team because she's Black.	
Chase	Kiersey Clemons	Easy	She falls in love with Jo.	
Clementine Chasseur	Kandyse McClure	Hemlock Grove	A werewolf hunter investigating murders while posing as a Fish and Wildlife agent.	
Chenoa	Shein Mompremier	Black Lightning	Was in a one-year relationship with Anissa Pierce.	
Suzy Choi	Kim Jung-hwa	Mine	An artist and Seo-hyun's first love. They are reunited.	
Denise Christopher	Sakina Jaffrey	Timeless	Special Agent Christopher is married to Michelle and has a daughter and son with her. In season 2, episode 8, "The Day Reagan Was Shot", a young Denise is played by Karen David.	
Denise Christopher	Karen David	Timeless	Special Agent Christopher is married to Michelle and has a daughter and son with her. In season 2, episode 8, "The Day Reagan Was Shot", a young Denise is played by Karen David.	
Christy	Parisa Fitz-Henley	Falling Water	Girlfriend of Alexis "Alex" Simms.	
Haley Clark	Susanna Skaggs	Halt and Catch Fire	Finally opens up to her sister, Joanie, about her sexual orientation (season 4).	
Dani Clayton	Victoria Pedretti	The Haunting of Bly Manor	Dani always felt uneasy in her relationship with Edmund and breaks up their engagement. After he is killed in an accident, she starts being haunted by him. At Bly Manor she meets Jamie, the estate's gardener, and subsequently comes out to herself. Dani and Jamie become a romantic couple.	
Cleo	Dani Verayo	The Next Step	Cleo is in a relationship with Jude.	
Dr. Denise Cloyd	Merritt Wever	The Walking Dead	Girlfriend of Tara Chambler.	
Raelle Collar	Taylor Hickson	Motherland: Fort Salem	Raelle is a witch and healer in a relationship with Scylla Ramshorn.	
Bethany Collins	Mugga	Manifest	Bethany is married to Georgia and is a flight attendant on Flight 828.	
Dulcie Collins	Kate Box	Deadloch	Dulcie is a former detective and Deadloch's senior sergeant. She is married to Cath York.	
Georgia Collins	Eva Kaminsky	Manifest	Georgia is married to Bethany Collins.	
Joey Collins	Kate Bell	Home and Away	Joey is in a relationship with Charlie Buckton and they kiss multiple times.	
Kate Connor	Faye Brookes	Coronation Street	Kate dates several women. She was engaged to Caz Hammond.	
Samara Cook	Claire Holt	Pretty Little Liars	Was in a relationship with Emily Fields.	
Helen Cooper	Ingrid Lacey	Drop the Dead Donkey	A single mother.	
Tamia "Coop" Cooper	Bre-Z	All American	In a relationship with Patience.	
Gina Cortes	Monique Gabriela Curnen	Elementary	After Detective Cortes confronts Joan Watson, Sherlock Holmes posits that she may have been incensed because perhaps Watson had sex with Cortes' significant other, to which Watson replied, "Considering she's gay and I'm not, I think that's highly unlikely."	
Fiona Coyne	Annie Clark	Degrassi: The Next Generation	Though she previously dated a male classmate, Fiona begins to develop feelings for classmate Imogen. She later comes out as a lesbian, and the two briefly date.	
Theodora Crain	Kate Siegel	The Haunting of Hill House	Theo becomes involved with Trish Park and lets Trish touch her. Theo and Trish move in together.	
Lana Crawford	Bridget Neval	Neighbours	The first lesbian character in the series, introduced in 2004.	
Courtney Crimsen	Michele Selene Ang	13 Reasons Why	Courtney was closeted until the finale episode of season 2 ("Bye"), when she came out to her adoptive gay parents.	
Robyn "Rob" Crisp	Minnie Crowe	Coming of Age	She is a friend of Matthew "Matt" Cobbett and goes to a lesbian bar with Darren "DK" Karrimore in the episode "Lesbian Jumper."	
Samantha 'Sam' Black Crow	Devery Jacobs	American Gods	Sam has a girlfriend, Natalie.	
Cruz	Maria-Elena Laas	Vida	Friend of Emma Hernandez and her former love interest.	
Bridey Cruz	Floriana Lima	The Family	Bridley is a reporter who is trying to uncover information what is happening related to the Warrens, the titular family in this series, dates women, and has a "strong feminine voice."	
Moiraine Damodred	Rosamund Pike	The Wheel of Time	Moiraine shares a secret, forbidden love with Siuan Sanche, the Amyrlin Seat.	
Jess Damon	Brooke Markham	In the Dark	Roommate and best friend of Murphy Mason. Jess is in a romantic relationship with Vanessa.	
Dani	Demi Lovato	Glee	She was Santana Lopez's girlfriend for a while.	
Daniella	Tricia O'Kelley	Red Band Society	Married to Sarah Souders.	
Kim Daniels	Olivia Hallinan	Sugar Rush	Protagonist of this series, at first in love with her best friend Sugar, but later becomes girlfriend of Saint.	
Alexandra "Alex" Danvers / Sentinel	Chyler Leigh	Supergirl	The episodes "Crossfire" and "Changing" deal with Alex's realization that she is attracted to girls and her coming out. (In episode "Medusa", her mother describes Alex as gay.)	
Greer Danville	Gracie Dzienny	Chasing Life	A popular rich girl at Brenna's school, it becomes clear that both Greer and Brenna are attracted to each other. They briefly date before her parents become unhappy with her dating a "trouble-maker" like Brenna. They briefly date again before Greer ends up moving.	
Dara	Caoilfhionn Dunne	How to Get to Heaven from Belfast	Dara is closeted and taking care of her elderly mother.	
Teri Darego	Wunmi Mosaku	The End of the F***ing World	Teri is a detective who has a one-night stand with fellow detective Eunice Noon (which Eunice regrets). They go on a trip across the country to catch a male psychopath.	
Daria	Florence Kasumba	Dominion	The lover and partner of Arika and appears in three episodes of the series.	
Joanne Davidson	Kelly Macdonald	Line of Duty	Senior Investigating Officer of "Operation Lighthouse" (season 6). Was in a secret relationship with her subordinate, Police Constable (now Sergeant) Farida Jatri.	
Elodie Davis	Brianna Hildebrand	Trinkets	A shy and quiet shoplifter who becomes infatuated with a band singer named Sabine and runs off with her. After she returns home she becomes involved with Jilllian, who has not completely come out yet.	
Shay Davydov	Ksenia Solo	Orphan Black	A holistic healer whom Cosima meets through a dating app called Sapphire, with both going on various dates together.	
Caroline Dawson	Sarah Lancashire	Last Tango in Halifax	Married to Kate McKenzie, with show's creator calling her killing a mistake.	
DeDe Halcyon Day	Barbara Garrick	Tales of the City	A wealthy socialite that came out publicly after the death of her husband; she has a sexual affair with younger woman Margot Park.	
Carmen de La Pica Morales	Sarah Shahi	The L Word	She has been in relationships with various women, including Lucía Torres at age 16, one-night stands with Shane McCutcheon, a serious relationship with Jenny Schecter, and had sex with a woman named Robin.	
Jo DeLuca	Melanie Field	A League of Their Own	Third base, power hitter, and Greta Gill's best friend. She's caught in a police raid of the underground lesbian bar.	
Karolina Dean	Virginia Gardner	Runaways	Karolina has the power to "fly and manipulate solar energy," and develops feelings for Nico Minoru. She initiates a kiss with her crush; which is reciprocated. After her capture and subsequent liberation, she is reunited with Nico. To her delight, Nico initiates their second kiss. Later that night, she falls asleep in Nico's arms.	
Deborah (a.k.a. Deb-Deb)	Julie Goldman	The Mindy Project	Deb is married to Dr. Jean Fishman.	
Lana Delaney	Jill Flint	The Good Wife	An FBI agent, Lana is one of Kalinda Sharma's lovers.	
Demet	Nicole Gulasekharam	Barracuda	Lifelong friend of Danny Kelly.	
Denise	Lena Waithe	Master of None	Denise's sexuality and how it impacts her relationship with both her friends and family is explored in season 2, episode 8, "Thanksgiving". She marries Alicia in season 3.	
Clare Devlin	Nicola Coughlan	Derry Girls	At the end series one finale, Clare comes out to her friends as a lesbian.	
Devon	Vedette Lim	Chicago Fire	Leslie Shay's girlfriend.	
Midge Dexter	Julie Kavner	Tracey Takes On...	A character frequently performed by actress Julie Kavner. Midge Dexter is a closeted pro-golfer and girlfriend to Chris Warner (Tracey Ullman). She is forced to come out publicly in season 1, episode "Romance" after Chris gives her an ultimatum. (Tracey Takes On... took home GLAAD Media Awards in 1996 and 1999.)	
Betty DiMello	Annaleigh Ashford	Masters of Sex	A prostitute and Helen's lover.	
Alessandra (Alex) Di Nardo	Simona Tabasco	The Bastards of Pizzofalcone	Closeted police officer in love with Rosaria Martone. (The scene of Alex and Rosaria kissing and their depiction of homosexuality was met with complaints from a Catholic newspaper and a member of Italy's Parliamentary Commission.	
Kathleen "Dixie" Dixon	Jane Hazlegrove	Casualty	An Operational Duty Officer and Paramedic who causes her father a heart attack when he sees her kissing another woman, later entering a relationship with a prison officer named Carol Walcott and later with Jess Cranham, a paramedic.	
Marlene Donaldson	Melanie Mayron	Jane the Virgin	Jane's college mentor.	
Camilla Donovan	Amanda Arcuri	Hudson & Rex	Camilla is the daughter of Superintendent Joseph Donovan.	
Dorka	Ildikó Tornyi	Társas játék	A masseuse. In a relationship with Judit Béres (bisexual).	
Franky Doyle	Carol Burns	Prisoner	A nicotine-stained biker who was imprisoned for armed robbery and murder and sentenced to life imprisonment at Wentworth Detention Centre, who was also in a forced romantic relationship with Doreen Anderson.	
Franky Doyle	Nicole da Silva	Wentworth	A main character, former protagonist and a former prisoner of Wentworth Correctional Centre, who had two ex-girlfriends (Kim Chang and Jodie Spiteri), was involved with Erica Davidson, and has a girlfriend named Bridget Westfall.	
Dr. Maggie Doyle	Jorja Fox	ER	A fictional ER intern and later ER resident who had an unnamed girlfriend.	
Roberta Drays	Patti Kim	The Killing	Roberta is the security chief at the Wapi Eagle Casino and is in a relationship with Nicole Jackson, head of the Kalimish tribe.	
Dominga "Daddy" Duarte	Vicci Martinez	Orange is the New Black	In a relationship with Officer McCullough, played by Emily Tarver, whom Martinez is dating in real life.	
Faith Duluth	Breeda Wool	The Faith Diaries	A contestant who is a shy and insecure Christian virgin, who later realizes she is a lesbian and in love with her female best friend back in her hometown in Mississippi.	
Claire Duncan	Zosia Mamet	Tales of the City	A documentarian and Shawna's love interest.	
Frances Dunhill	Cassidy Freeman	The Playboy Club	She begins dating Nick Dalton as his beard to provide him a politically acceptable "girlfriend" and to make her appear heterosexual to her father.	
Callie Dunne	Tess Frazer	Godless	Callie is the town's schoolteacher and was previously a prostitute in its brothel. She is in love with Mary Agnes McNue.	

=== E–H ===
Character	Portrayed by	Program	Notes	Ref(s)
Edie	Stephanie Erb	A League of Their Own	Wife of Vi, the owner of the underground lesbian and gay bar.	
Isolde Eidsvoll	Ylva Bjørkaas Thedin	Ragnarok	Isolde is an activist who discovers that a rich family is to blame for poisonous levels of cadmium in the town's water system. After coming out, Islode uncovers their conspiracy and they kill her, making it look like an accident.	
Adena El-Amin	Nikohl Boosheri	The Bold Type	A Muslim woman, photographer, and Kat Edison's love interest.	
Elena	Nicola Correia-Damude	The Boys	Elena is in an off-again/on-again relationship with Queen Maeve (bisexual).	
Nicole Ellis	Luna Blaise	Fresh Off the Boat	In season 4 episode 6, she reveals to Jessica and Honey that she is gay.	
Emilie	Julie Christiansen	Heartless	Emilie falls in love with Sofie.	
Emma	Julia Davis	Sally4Ever	Has sex with another woman.	
Kelly Epson	Vanessa Lengies	Hawthorne	A scrub-charge who comes out in episode 7 of season 2 to a fellow patient who is also struggling to recognize her sexual orientation.	
Erica	Gemma Chan	Dates	Erica had been hiding her sexual orientation from her traditional Chinese family, until she met Kate.	
Darya Esford	Narges Rashidi	The Girlfriend Experience	Esford is the ex-lover of Erica Myles.	
Esther	Andia Winslow	A League of Their Own	A pitcher for Red Wright's All-Stars Negro League traveling team who gives Max Chapman the opportunity to pitch in a professional game.	
Tilly Evans	Lucy Dixon	Hollyoaks	Girlfriend of Esther Bloom.	
Dana Fairbanks	Erin Daniels	The L Word	She was the girlfriend of Alice Pieszecki and Lara Perkins during the series.	
Juliette Fairmont	Sarah Catherine Hook	First Kill	Juliette is a vampire. She falls for Calliope Burns, a monster hunter.	
Faith	Alicia Vikander	One Red Nose Day and a Wedding	Faith, daughter of Fiona, marries Miranda, the daughter of Charles and Carrie, in this short film sequel to the film Four Weddings and a Funeral.	
Carol Farman	Bronagh Waugh	Ridley	DI Farman is Ridley's protégé and leads the investigation team. She has a son, Jack, with her wife Geri Farman.	
Hayley Fawkner	Alexandra Adornetto	Playing for Keeps	Dating a cheerleader.	
Teresa Fenchurch	Leanne Best	Home Fires	A closeted lesbian in 1940s England, Teresa moved to Great Paxford after the head master at the Liverpool school where she taught discovered the relationship between her and Connie Ward, another teacher at the school.	
Joan "The Freak" Ferguson	Maggie Kirkpatrick	Prisoner	An intelligent prison officer at Wentworth Detention Centre who controversially frisked individuals and wore black leather gloves. (She later appeared in the Wentworth series.)	
Joan Ferguson	Pamela Rabe	Wentworth	Was in a relationship with inmate Jianna Riley.	
Macarena Fernández-Wilson	Patricia Vico	Hospital Central	Plays a pediatrician on the show.	
Marina Ferrer	Karina Lombard	The L Word	Jenny Schecter's ex-girlfriend.	
Danielle Ferrington	Niamh McGrady	The Fall	Police officer. Comes out to Stella Gibson.	
Emily Fields	Shay Mitchell	Pretty Little Liars	Emily comes out in season 1 and is involved in several relationships throughout the seasons. She is engaged to Alison DiLaurentis.	
Dr. Jean Fishman	Niecy Nash	The Mindy Project	A doctor and the chief of OB/GYN at the hospital where Dr. Mindy Kuhel Lahiri works.	
Emily Fitch	Kathryn Prescott	Skins	Was in a relationship with Naomi Campbell.	
Jenny Flint	Catrin Stewart	Doctor Who	Married to Madame Vastra, who mentioned that Jenny's family shunned her for her sexuality.	
Amy Flower	Sophia Di Martino	Flowers	Amy is dating Hylda, an older, ex-junkie, lesbian vicar.	
Naomi Flynn	Maureen Sebastian	American Gothic	Political campaign manager. Has an affair with Alison Hawthorne-Price (bisexual).	
Lena Adams Foster	Sherri Saum	The Fosters	Married to Stef Adams Foster.	
Stef Adams Foster	Teri Polo	The Fosters	Married to Lena Adams Foster.	
Fran	Eiza González	I Care a Lot	Fran is Marla Grayson's partner in both business and life, forming a committed couple central to the story.	
Charlie Freemont	Tattiawna Jones	Under the Christmas Tree	Charlie is searching for the perfect Christmas tree for the governor of Maine. She finds it on Alma Beltran's property.	
Cordelia Fried	Isabelle Bonfrer	Pandora	Ex-girlfriend of Jacqueline Zhou (bisexual).	
Charlotte Gaines	Fedna Jacquet	FBI: Most Wanted	Law professor and wife of FBI Special Agent Sheryll Barnes.	
Nicole Galassini	Kellie Martin	Army Wives	Nicole is a captain and Army intelligence officer. She is in a relationship with Charlotte (Charlie) Mayfield, a black woman.	
Dorothy Gale	Teri Reeves	Once Upon a Time	Dorothy is awakened from a sleeping spell with a True Love kiss from Ruby (a.k.a. Red Lucas). She is in love with Ruby and they become lovers.	
Robin Gallagher	Julie Benz	Desperate Housewives	A former stripper at Double D's who later becomes roommates with Katherine, who she is romantically interested in, and later move away, together, to Paris.	
Quinni Gallagher-Jones	Chloé Hayden	Heartbreak High	Quinni is autistic and a student at Hartley High.	
Brenda Garay	Gimena Accardi	Sos mi hombre	After meeting Marisa, Brenda comes out and soon becomes romantically involved with her.	
Lupe García	Roberta Colindrez	A League of Their Own	Fastball pitcher nicknamed the "Spanish Striker". Hangs out with Jess McCready at the underground lesbian bar.	
Sky Garibaldi	Arielle Kebbel	Grand Hotel	Was in a secret relationship with Yolanda Renna.	
Regina George	Seychelle Gabriel	Revenge	She has a crush on Charlotte Grayson where they both once drunkenly kissed.	
Marigold Gilchrist	Amara Miller	1600 Penn	The President's younger daughter.	
Greta Gill	D'Arcy Carden	A League of Their Own	A femme baseball player who seduces, and falls in love with, Carson Shaw (bisexual). Greta is cautious about displaying her sexuality in public after a girlfriend in her past was "sent away" by her parents when they discovered the two of them together.	
Jen Gilmore	Amy Downham	Hollyoaks	A teacher who became romantically involved with her pupil Tilly Evans (Lucy Dixon).	
Sharon Gilmour	Margot Knight	Prisoner	a scheming, spoiled young woman imprisoned for drug dealing, and has a romantic relationship with Chrissie Latham inside the prison, and Judy Bryant, outside the prison, with the latter putting an end to their relationship.	
Opal Gilstrap	Ilfenesh Hadera	She's Gotta Have It	The love interest of Opal Gilstrap and later has sex with her.	
Arleen Gonzales	Rachel Ticotin	Law & Order: LA	Lt. Gonzales is a Commanding Officer of the LAPD Robbery Homicide Division. She comes out when a defendant in a murder case tries to paint her as a racist.	
Mary Goskirk	Louise Jameson	Emmerdale	A journalist who comes out aged 70.	
Alice Gove	Pippa Nixon	Cuffs	An artist and partner of Donna Prager.	
Alisha Granderson	Christina Elmore	The Last Ship	Lt. Granderson is out of the closet. An officer of the deck on Nathan James and later serves at Naval Station Mayport under Admiral Meylan. She is killed by her girlfriend.	
Wren Grant	Candice Coke	Proven Innocent	Inmate and prison girlfriend of Madeline Scott (bisexual).	
Marla Grayson	Rosamund Pike	I Care a Lot	Marla is a ruthless legal guardian who shares a committed relationship with Fran, her business partner and lover.	
Shakima "Kima" Greggs	Sonja Sohn	The Wire	A determined and capable uncloseted police detective in the Baltimore Police Department.	
Tammy Gregorio	Vanessa Ferlito	NCIS: New Orleans	Tammy is introduced in season 3; in 3x18 she describes herself as 'gay'. (The show's producers confirmed her lesbian orientation.	)
Greta	Liv Lisa Fries	Counterpart	A cafe barista in Earth Alpha world. Becomes involved with Baldwin, and ends their relationship when she cannot trust her.	
Greta	Sophie Guillemin	The Frozen Dead	She is the partner of Irène Ziegler.	
Bianca Grieve	Anita Hegh	Janet King	Federal Police Sergeant Grieve is assigned to protect Janet King after working undercover on an investigation headed by her. They had both previously shown signs of attraction, but kept it under control. They become sexually involved while Bianca is guarding Janet at home and it develops into a romantic relationship.	
Lia Haddock	Jessica Biel	Limetown	Lia is a journalist investigating the disappearance of the population of a small Appalachian town.	
Erica Hahn	Brooke Smith	Grey's Anatomy	Had a short romantic relationship with Callie Torres and was later written off the show.	
Niko Hamada	Ellen Tamaki	Charmed	Nico is a detective and is dating Melanie Vera.	
Beatrice Hamelin	Mylène Dinh-Robic	19-2	Main character. Nickamed "Bear", Hamelin is a highly respected officer at the 19th precinct, where she has served for nine years. She is promoted to Acting Sergeant, and finally as Sergeant. She has had romantic and sexual relationships with several women, is infatuated with fellow officer Audrey Pouliot, and begins dating officer Roxanne Dionne, a new member of the Station 19 police force.	
Hannah	Hannah Gadsby	Please Like Me		
Jenny Harper	Amber Tamblyn	Two and a Half Men	Charlie Harper's illegitimate daughter and Alan's niece. She briefly dates a girl named Brooke but eventually returns to her promiscuous ways.	
Thelma Harris	Laura Mennell	The Man in the High Castle	She's closeted and involved with Nicole Dörme (bisexual).	
Alexandra Harrison	Eisa Davis	Blindspot	In a relationship with Bethany Mayfair.	
Lydia Hart	Lydia Kelly	Hollyoaks	A seemingly level-headed music lover and friend of Josh Ashworth, who is an opinionated, passionate young student who had a love of music and protecting her family, with her relationship to the sexually confused Sarah Barnes central to the character until Lydia killed her.	
Beverly Harris	Estelle Parsons	Roseanne	Roseanne and Jackie's mom.	
Jenny Hartmann	Lucy Scherer	Hand aufs Herz	Jenny is a girl in a fictional high school in Cologne.	
Sara Harvey	Dre Davis	Pretty Little Liars	Sara and Emily Fields were in a short-lived toxic relationship which went from them being friends to enemies within a season.	
Lucienne Hassell	Maimie McCoy	Van der Valk	Lucienne is a detective in Amsterdam's National Police Force and the sidekick of Commissioner Piet van der Valk.	
Ruby Haswell	Alicya Eyo	Emmerdale	A woman who is comfortable with herself and her sexuality. She kisses Ali.	
Nicole Haught	Katherine Barrell	Wynonna Earp	Officer Nicole Haught was flirtatious but cautious towards Waverly Earp. They became a couple after Waverly confessed to Nicole that she wanted to be with her. In season 2, we find out that Nicole has an estranged wife named Shae whom she married impulsively not long after they had met. In the final episode of the season, Nicole receives signed divorce papers from Shae.	
Janis Hawk	Christine Woods	FlashForward	An FBI Special Agent.	
Joy Hawk	Tamara Podemski	Outer Range	Native American deputy sheriff running for election as sheriff of the county. In an open same-sex marriage with Martha, with whom she has a daughter named Rose.	
Martha Hawk	Morningstar Angeline	Outer Range	Partner of Joy Hawk.	
Maddie Heath	Amy James-Kelly	Coronation Street	Sophie Webster's girlfriend.	
Heather	Stephanie Hyam	Doctor Who	In episode 1 of series 10, Heather and Bill admit they 'really liked' each other, before they part ways. In the series 10 finale, 'The Doctor Falls', Heather returns to save Bill's life. When Bill requires confirmation of whether or not she is dead, Heather kisses her. From there, they save the Doctor and depart the T.A.R.D.I.S. to have presumably eternal adventures in space and time as a couple at last.	
Helen	Sarah Silverman	Masters of Sex	Lover of Betty DeMello.	
Emma Hernandez	Mishel Prada	Vida	A type-A personality queer woman who was in love with Cruz.	
Greta Hérnandez	Clara Galle	Raising Voices	Greta's sexuality is first mentioned when she tells Alma about a wet dream she had involving a woman walking her like a dog. She later meets and hangs out with Mercedes, a woman 20 years older than her.	
Nora Hildegard	Scarlett Byrne	The Vampire Diaries	Nora was in love with Mary Louise at the time of her death and was engaged to her.	
Carolyn Hill	Aisha Hinds	Under the Dome	In a relationship with Alice Calvert.	
Neika Hobbs	Nia Long	Dear White People	Neika is engaged to her partner Monique.	
Isabelle Hodes	Allie Grant	Weeds	Teen daughter of Celia Hodes and openly lesbian, which annoys her mother. Later in the series, Isabelle has sex reassignment surgery to become a trans man named Bruce.	
Jeri Hogarth	Carrie-Anne Moss	Daredevil	Jeri is a high-power attorney. In Jessica Jones, she wanted to divorce her wife Wendy so that she could be with her mistress Pam. In season 3, Jeri is diagnosed with ALS and deals with the news by having a drug-fueled orgy with three call girls. (Jeri Hogarth is the first lesbian character in the Marvel Cinematic Universe.)	
Jeri Hogarth	Carrie-Anne Moss	The Defenders	Jeri is a high-power attorney. In Jessica Jones, she wanted to divorce her wife Wendy so that she could be with her mistress Pam. In season 3, Jeri is diagnosed with ALS and deals with the news by having a drug-fueled orgy with three call girls. (Jeri Hogarth is the first lesbian character in the Marvel Cinematic Universe.)	
Jeri Hogarth	Carrie-Anne Moss	Iron Fist	Jeri is a high-power attorney. In Jessica Jones, she wanted to divorce her wife Wendy so that she could be with her mistress Pam. In season 3, Jeri is diagnosed with ALS and deals with the news by having a drug-fueled orgy with three call girls. (Jeri Hogarth is the first lesbian character in the Marvel Cinematic Universe.)	
Jeri Hogarth	Carrie-Anne Moss	Jessica Jones	Jeri is a high-power attorney. In Jessica Jones, she wanted to divorce her wife Wendy so that she could be with her mistress Pam. In season 3, Jeri is diagnosed with ALS and deals with the news by having a drug-fueled orgy with three call girls. (Jeri Hogarth is the first lesbian character in the Marvel Cinematic Universe.)	
Cassidy Holland	Anna Silk	Being Erica	Cassidy is a graduate student who was a close friend of Erica's in college.	
Jenna Faith Hope	Sarah Desjardins	Impulse	Jenna questions her sexuality throughout season 1, and in season 2 comes out as a lesbian after meeting a girl at a college party and being kissed by her.	
Pam Horton	Meghan Leathers	For All Mankind	Secret girlfriend of Ellen Waverly and bartender at the Outpost Tavern. She ended their relationship after Ellen chose to be in a fake marriage in order to save her career at NASA.	
Elsie Hughes	Shannon Woodward	Westworld	In the first episode of season 1, after finishing analyzing the 'host' Clementine Pennyfeather, Elsie's colleague leaves the room. Finally alone, Elsie takes this moment to tenderly kiss the dormant Clementine.	
Kelly Hurst	Nicky Talacko	Family Affairs	Kelly was a surrogate mother for Karen and Matt. She fell in love with Karen and they became a couple. After the baby was born, Matt killed her by pushing her down the stairs.	
Linh Xuan Huy	Kae Alexander	Collateral	Linh, an illegal immigrant, is the lover of vicar Jane Oliver.	

=== I–L ===
Character	Portrayed by	Program	Notes	Ref(s)
Tara Milly Izikoff	Anna Konkle	Rosewood	Pippy's girlfriend/wife.	
Izzie	Fivel Stewart	Atypical	Izzie has a relationship with Casey, who left her boyfriend so she could be with Izzie.	
Nicole Jackson	Claudia Ferri	The Killing	Corrupt head of the Kalimish tribe and manager of the Wapi Eagle Casino. She is in a relationship with Roberta Drays, the casino's security chief.	
Jamie	Amelia Eve	The Haunting of Bly Manor	Jamie is a gardener at Bly Manor. She becomes romantically involved with Dani Clayton and they enter into a relationship that lasts throughout the series.	
Farida Jatri	Anneika Rose	Line of Duty	Police Constable, now Sergeant, Jatri was in a secret relationship with SIO Joanne Davidson, her superior.	
Jean	Lois Nettleton	The Golden Girls	Dorothy's college friend, Jean, is visiting Miami and staying at the house. Her partner of eight years, Pat, died the year before. Rose is not told that Jean is an out lesbian. Jean and Rose spend the evening playing cards and talking, and Rose tells Jean that she can share her room. Jean, who has developed a crush on Rose, tells her that she's "quite fond of her" and Rose, realizing what she meant, feigns being asleep. The next day, Dorothy confirms Rose's suspicion about Jean's sexual orientation. Jean decides to leave earlier than planned and tells Rose that she never should have said anything to her; explaining that the last year had been difficult for her, she felt alone, and after meeting Rose became confused about her feelings. Rose replied that she did not understand the kind of feeling Jean felt, but if she were to have been like her, she would have been flattered and proud that she thought of her that way. Rose told Jean that she didn't have to leave and Jean tells Rose that their friendship is enough. Episode "Isn't It Romantic?" (2x05).	
Maia Jeffries	Anna Jullienne	Shortland Street	Married her lover Jessica "Jay" Copeland on Valentine's Day 2006.	
Candace Jewell	Ion Overman	The L Word	Has an affair with Bette Porter.	
Jez	Lindsey Dawson	Shameless (U.K.)	Jez is the owner of the local pub.	
Manola Jimenez	Gabrielle Walsh	From Dusk till Dawn	Girlfriend of Kisa (aka Santánico Pandemoniu / La Diosa). Killed by demon Amaru.	
Jo	Jacqueline Toboni	Easy	She falls in love with Chase.	
Tara Jones	Corinna Brown	Heartstopper	Tara is in a relationship with Darcy Olsson, a fellow student at her all-girls school. She starts becoming confident in her sexual orientation and begins to come out publicly.	
Beth Jordache	Anna Friel	Brookside	Beth kissed the family nanny Margaret Clemence, she later dies in prison of a heart condition. (Beth's kiss with Margaret was the first female same-sex kiss to be broadcast before 9 pm on British TV.)	
Jude	Molly Saunders	The Next Step	Jude is in a relationship with Cleo.	
Naomi Julien	Petra Letang	EastEnders	Lover of Sonia Fowler.	
Jung Seo-hyun	Kim Seo-hyung	Mine	Although married to the first son of the Hyowon Group chaebol family, she is in love with Suzy Choi, her first love. She comes out in episode 13, when she tells her husband "I'm a lesbian. The person in my heart, my one and only love, is a woman", admits that she deceived him when they married, and apologizes. (He accepts her sexual orientation and supports her, but doesn't want a divorce because it would be humiliating.) Seo-hyun has lived self-controlled, but after becoming chairwoman of Hyowon Group she calls Suzy to say she missed her and was going to go see her. (The series features the first lesbian lead character in a K-drama.)	
Katherine "Kate" Kane / Batwoman	Ruby Rose	Batwoman	In military Academy, Kate was in a secret relationship with Sophie Moore that ended when her sexual orientation was discovered; she was expelled, and Sophie chose to stay behind and said she was not in love with her. She is the first lesbian superhero to head a prime time series.	
Karen	Kaya Scodelario	True Love	She is Holly's lover.	
Karen	Malkia Stampley	The Chi	Karen is a postal worker, and former girlfriend of Kevin's mom.	
Karn	Laura Matthews	EastEnders	Theo's friend from a university.	
Kate	Katie McGrath	Dates	Girlfriend of Erica.	
Kati	Julia Richter	Kommt Mausi raus?!	A 20-year old woman who discovers her homosexuality in Hamburg after she moved there from a rural region.	
Sydney Katz	Stacey Farber	Saving Hope	Sydney struggled to come to terms with her sexual orientation and her faith (Orthodox Judaism). In season 3, she admits to Maggie Lin that she is attracted to women and they kiss. After this, she broke up with her fiancé Hershel and came out as a lesbian.	
Cinta Kaz	Varada Sethu	Andor	The Aldhani rebels medic and healer. She is in a relationship with Vel Sartha.	
Keelin	Christina Moses	The Originals	In a relationship with Freya Mikaelson. She states her previous relationship was also with a woman.	
Nellie Keene	Jeananne Crowley	Tenko	Nellie is a nurse in the Japanese internment camp whose unrequited love for fellow inmate Sally is seen as "unnatural" by other inmates.	
Delle Seyah Kendry	Mayko Nguyen	Killjoys	She flirts with Yalena "Dutch" Yardeen and eventually kisses her. She seduces Aneela.	
Kennedy	Iyari Limon	Buffy the Vampire Slayer	She is out and has an assertive personality. Kennedy is among the girls who might become endowed with supernatural abilities, destined to battle evil creatures such as vampires and demons. She is a love interest of Willow Rosenberg (which is intended to contrast with the shyness of Willow's deceased girlfriend, Tara).	
Taylor Kim	Alli Chung	Coroner	A detective. Told her colleague that she lives with her girlfriend and three dogs (season 1/episode 8).	
Janet King	Marta Dusseldorp	Crownies	A Senior Crown Prosecutor, her life partner Ashleigh Larsson, with whom she had two children, was murdered. She later becomes romantically involved with undercover officer Bianca Grieve, who was assigned to protect her from harm. Janet King is the first lesbian lead character in Australian television.	
Janet King	Marta Dusseldorp	Janet King	A Senior Crown Prosecutor, her life partner Ashleigh Larsson, with whom she had two children, was murdered. She later becomes romantically involved with undercover officer Bianca Grieve, who was assigned to protect her from harm. Janet King is the first lesbian lead character in Australian television.	
Ruka Kishimoto	Juri Ueno	Last Friends	Ruka is a motocross racer.	
Eryka Klein	Laura De Boer	The Tunnel	Eryka falls in love with Elise Wassermann.	
Jocelyn Knight	Charlotte Rampling	Broadchurch	A barrister for the prosecution, she confesses her long-held love for Maggie Radcliffe and becomes romantically involved with her.	
Kris	Roxie Johnson	195 Lewis	Former girlfriend of Yuri.	
Krishna	Shelly Bhalla	Jane the Virgin	Petra's assistant.	
Phyllis Kroll	Cybill Shepherd	The L Word	Had relationships with Alice Pieszecki and Joyce Wischnia.	
Alice Kwan	Sherry Cola	Good Trouble	The manager of The Coterie apartment building.	
Sascha Kyte	Victoria Broom	Marcella	Sascha is the partner of Jojo Baines.	
Nisha Lal	Taj Atwal	Riot Women	Nisha is a police officer.	
Odette LaMar	Leah Lewis / Anja Savcic	Nancy Drew	Vengeful ghost of 18th century French heiress and businesswoman in love with Mary, an English woman. Odette was murdered at sea on a voyage to America, where she sought to establish a home and life for herself and Mary. Her fortune was stolen by the ship's captain with a counterfeit marriage certificate. Odette became bound to the body of Georgia ("George") Fan and coexists with her. Odette finds a connection with Bess Marvin, who is also lesbian, and flirts with her.	
Emma Lane	Rose Leslie	Luther	DS Lane is Luther's new partner.	
Ashleigh Larsson	Aimee Pedersen	Crownies	The life partner of Janet King for nine years and co-parent of their two children. Ashleigh was murdered.	
Ashleigh Larsson	Aimee Pedersen	Janet King	The life partner of Janet King for nine years and co-parent of their two children. Ashleigh was murdered.	
Charlotte Lau	Amy Yamazaki	Hollyoaks	She debuted on-screen as the ex-girlfriend of Lydia Hart.	
Laura	Angel M. Wainwright	Underemployed	Involved with Sophia Swanson.	
Agnes 'Lee' Lebachi	Adelayo Adedayo	Origin	Had a relationship with a female AI.	
Dr. Kim Legaspi	Elizabeth Mitchell	ER	A psychiatrist who was later involved in a friendship with Kerry Weaver that turns into more than a friendship after Kerry realizes she is a lesbian.	
Skye Leighton	Rahne Jones	The Politician	Dates McAfee Westbrook (bisexual).	
Jodi Lerner	Marlee Matlin	The L Word	Bette Porter's ex-girlfriend.	
Emily Levinson	Alison Louder	Being Human	She has a girlfriend named Jackie who is recovering in a hospital and later breaks up with her.	
Lauren Lewis	Zoie Palmer	Lost Girl	Dr. Lauren Lewis spends years as a pledged servant to The Ash (leader of the Light Fae) so that she can find a cure for her comatose girlfriend's (Nadia) mysterious illness. Lauren and Bo, a succubus Fae, fall in love. In the last episode of the series they pledge themselves to each other and become a permanent couple. (The relationship between Lauren and Bo became known by the portmanteau "Doccubus", a blend of "Doctor" + "Succubus".)	
Lexa	Alycia Debnam-Carey	The 100	After the funeral of Clarke's prior love interest, Lexa mentions that she "had someone special too." Lexa goes on to describe how her love, Costia, had been abducted, tortured, and beheaded by a political enemy. Later, Lexa kisses Clarke in her tent before the battle. In Season 3, Lexa gets on her knees in front of Clarke, and pledges herself to her in no uncertain terms. Later in the season, Lexa and Clarke have sex. In the scene after their union, Lexa gets shot and dies. In season 4, Clarke confesses to her mother that she loved Lexa.	
Leyla	Shiva Kalaiselvan	New Amsterdam	In a relationship with Lauren Bloom (bisexual).	
Vivian Lim	Thaddea Graham	Wreck	Vivian is Jamie's sidekick. She has multiple sexual and non-sexual encounters with women.	
Lou Linklatter	Breeda Wool	Mr. Mercedes	An outspoken young woman.	
Jo Lipsett	Sarah-Jane Potts	Waterloo Road	Jo neither denies nor flaunts her sexual orientation.	
Lisbeth	Katie Findlay	Nancy Drew	State police officer, involved with Bess Marvin. Invited Bess to meet her parents.	
Anne Lister	Maxine Peake	The Secret Diaries of Miss Anne Lister	Anne Lister lived an open lesbian lifestyle in 19th century Yorkshire. She was nicknamed "Gentleman Jack" by the local townspeople. The character is based on the real life landowner and diarist.	
Anne Lister	Suranne Jones	Gentleman Jack	Anne Lister lived an open lesbian lifestyle in 19th century Yorkshire. She was nicknamed "Gentleman Jack" by the local townspeople. The character is based on the real life landowner and diarist.	
Kate Littlejohn	Susannah Flood	For the People	Kate is involved with ATF agent Anya Ooms.	
Liz	Chelsea Hayes	Complications	Gretchen Polk's girlfriend.	
Sandy Lopez	Lisa Vidal	ER	The girlfriend of Kerry Weaver and firefighter, who later has a child with Kerry named Henry Lopez.	
Santana Lopez	Naya Rivera	Glee	Previously dated glee club member, Puck. In season 2, she struggles with her feelings for best friend Brittany and later comes out to her as a lesbian.	
Olivia Lord	Portia de Rossi	Nip/Tuck	An expert in Eastern medicine and Julia's one-time lover.	
Mary Louise	Teresa Liane	The Vampire Diaries	Mary Louise was in love with Nora at the time of her death and was engaged to her.	
Lucy	Alyssa Diaz	The Bridge	Girlfriend of Adriana Perez.	
Edith Lyons	Jessica Hynes	Years and Years	In an on/off relationship with Fran Baxter, eventually moves in with her (episode 5).	

=== M–P ===
Character	Portrayed by	Program	Notes	Ref(s)
Lao Ma	Jacqueline Kim	Xena: Warrior Princess	One of the love interests of Xena.	
Cat MacKenzie	Laura Fraser	Lip Service	Cat is an architect, with a girlfriend who is a police officer.	
Tara Maclay	Amber Benson	Buffy the Vampire Slayer	Was romantically involved in a serious relationship with Willow Rosenberg.	
Elizabeth "Mac" Macmillan	Tammy MacIntosh	Miss Fisher's Murder Mysteries	Dr. 'Mac' is Miss Phryne Fisher's best friend and confidante. She does not conceal her sexual nature and sports menswear in public (fedora, trousers, waistcoat, ascot, two-tone oxfords).	
Maggie	Debi Mazar	Younger	Best friend and roommate of Liza Miller.	
Magna	Nadia Hilker	The Walking Dead	Partner of Yumiko.	
Kay Manz	Lauren Glazier	Mindhunter	Kay is divorced and has a son. When she divorced, she left custody of her son to her ex-husband because she did not want to continue suppressing her identity and sexual preference. Kay meets Wendy Carr and they enter into a relationship, but it is ended by Wendy after Kay forgot that a custodial exchange weekend had been changed, and when Kay told her ex-husband that she was going to introduce their son to a "friend" and he asked if it was someone important, Wendy overheard Kay answer 'no'.	
Roz Marchetti	Sharon Duncan-Brewster	Sex Education	Wife of Sofia Marchetti.	
Sofia Marchetti	Hannah Waddingham	Sex Education	Wife of Roz Marchetti and mother of Jackson Marchetti.	
Melanie Marcus	Michelle Clunie	Queer as Folk (U.S.)	Melanie is in a domestic partner relationship with Lindsay Peterson. They break up after Lindsay has an affair with a man and are later reunited.	
Margaux	Kelly Walker	Swamp Thing	Girlfriend of Liz Tremayne.	
Marion	Joan Severance	American Horror Story: Asylum	Marion is the love interest of Lana Winters.	
Marisa	Sabrina Texidor	Grand Hotel	Dating Yolanda "Yoli" Renna.	
Marisa	Luciana González Costa	Sos mi hombre	Marisa is a personal trainer. She becomes romantically involved with Brenda Garay.	
Mandy Marquez	Danielle Henry	Doctors	Mandy is in a relationship with Freya.	
Deborah "Dee" Marshall	Ashley D. Kelley	Insatiable	An overweight woman who later has a girlfriend named Nonnie.	
Edwina "Eddy" Martínez	Ser Anzoategui	Vida	The butch widow of Vida, Lyn and Emma's mother, and co-owner of a lesbian bar.	
Rosaria Martone	Serena Iansiti	The Bastards of Pizzofalcone	Coroner in a secret romance with Alex di Nardo. (The scene of Rosaria and Alex kissing and their depiction of homosexuality was met with complaints from a Catholic newspaper and a member of Italy's Parliamentary Commission.	
Tea Marvelli	Sofia Black-D'Elia	Skins (US)	A self-confident woman from a Jewish-Italian family that does not know she is a lesbian.	
Bess Marvin	Maddison Jaizani	Nancy Drew	Waitress at The Bayside Claw. Romantically involved with Lisbeth, but believing that she was going to die, Bess stood up Lisbeth by not going to the dinner date where she was to be introduced to her parents.	
Jo Masters	Sally Rogers	The Bill	An out-and-proud police sergeant, in a relationship with a woman named Tess Henry.	
Emily Mather	Valarie Pettiford	A Discovery of Witches	Emily is a witch. She is the partner of Sarah Bishop.	
Max	Jessica Parker Kennedy	Black Sails	Had a relationship with Eleanor Guthrie and is in a relationship with Anne Bonny. Max is a former sex worker and expresses no sexual or romantic interest towards men whatsoever. In season 4, she faces the difficult choice to either lose everything or marry a man, and she chooses not to marry someone she could never feel attraction towards.	
Amanda Myers	Enid-Raye Adams	Travelers	Physicist and partner of Samantha Burns. Designed the singularity engine with Burns.	
Bethany Mayfair	Marianne Jean-Baptiste	Blindspot	In a relationship with Alexandra. Was previously with Sofia.	
Ally Mayfair-Richards	Sarah Paulson	American Horror Story: Cult	Ally is married Ivy Mayfair-Richards.	
Charlotte (Charlie) Mayfield	Ryan Michelle Bathe	Army Wives	Charlie is the civilian partner of Captain Nicole Galassini.	
Valerie McAllister	Elizabeth McLaughlin	Betrayal		
Kate McBride	Lindsay Crouse	Hill Street Blues	Kate is a police officer.	
Dawn McClane	Kristen Bush	The Following	Married Gina Mendez.	
Jess McCready	Kelly McCormack	A League of Their Own	A shortstop from Canada. She is constantly being fined by the Rockford Peaches chaperone for wearing pants in public. Hangs out with Lupe García at the underground lesbian bar.	
Paige McCullers	Lindsey Shaw	Pretty Little Liars	Emily Field's ex-girlfriend.	
Shane McCutcheon	Katherine Moennig	The L Word	Shane has had relationships with Carmen de la Pica Morales, Molly Kroll, Jenny Schecter, Dawn Denbo, Cindi Tucker, and others (original TLW series).	
Shane McCutcheon	Katherine Moennig	The L Word: Generation Q	Shane has had relationships with Carmen de la Pica Morales, Molly Kroll, Jenny Schecter, Dawn Denbo, Cindi Tucker, and others (original TLW series).	
Marilyn McGrath	Gail Strickland	HeartBeat	McGrath is a nurse practitioner and co-founder of a women's clinic. She is in a long-term relationship with Patty. The character of Marilyn McGrath was a groundbreaker as the first main character in a U.S. prime time series that identified as a lesbian.	
Marilyn McGrath-Dufresne	Kristin Lehman	Ghost Wars	Marilyn is the town's doctor. She is married to Val McGrath-Dufresne.	
Val McGrath-Dufresne	Luvia Petersen	Ghost Wars	Val is the mayor of the small Alaskan town. She is married to Marilyn McGrath-Dufresne.	
Greta McGraw	Anna McGahan	Picnic at Hanging Rock	Greta was exiled from home by her father for being a lesbian. She is in a relationship with Marion Quade.	
Cat McKenzie	Laura Fraser	Lip Service		
Kate McKenzie	Nina Sosanya	Last Tango in Halifax	Married to Caroline Dawson.	
Carla McLain	Claire Perkins	Silo	Head of Supply. Used to be married to Martha Walker.	
Gloria McManus	Paula Pell	Girls5Eva	Gloria is an out lesbian. (The series explores her history as closeted young popstar, her relationship with her ex-wife, and her hope of being an inspirational queer icon.)	
Betty McRae	Ali Liebert	Bomb Girls	Betty is closeted and falls for her straight friend, but is rejected by her. Later, she meets Teresa, who pursues her. They become romantically involved.	
Cissy Meldrum	Catherine Rabett	You Rang, M'Lord?	The elder daughter of Lord Meldrum who takes part in men's sports and activities and has a woman named Penelope as a frequent house guest (subtext that Cissy is a lesbian).	
Melissa (aka Kelly)	Jenna Burgess; Hilary Swank	Yellowjackets	In a relationship with Shauna Shipman; afterwards, as an adult, she changes her name to "Kelly", and marries Alex, Hannah's daughter.	
Gina Mendez	Valerie Cruz	The Following	An FBI agent. Married to Dawn McClane. Her ex-wife is Jana Murphy.	
Kate Messner	Peyton Kennedy	Everything Sucks!	Kate spends the season struggling with her sexual orientation and enters a relationship with her friend Luke after a rumor of her being gay is spread around school. After realizing and admitting that she is a lesbian, Kate and classmate Emaline reveal their attraction for each other, and later kiss.	
Julie Meyer	Céline Sallette	Les Revenants	A nurse who adopts the ghost boy Victor. Girlfriend of officer Laure Valère.	
Mickey	Dot-Marie Jones	The Faith Diaries	Mickey is in love with a woman named Ruth.	
Patricia "Tricia" Miller	Madeline Brewer	Orange Is the New Black	A young inmate in Litchfield Penitentiary, she had a girlfriend named Mercy Valduto.	
Miranda	Lily James	One Red Nose Day and a Wedding	Miranda, daughter of Charles and Carrie, marries Faith, the daughter of Fiona, in this short film sequel to the film Four Weddings and a Funeral.	
Tara Mohr	Annapurna Sriram	Billions	After a cocaine-snorting lesbian sex tryst that was secretly videotaped, she was blackmailed into spying on her employer, the U.S. Attorney. She was not seen again in the series after being caught snooping by a coworker.	
Moira	Samira Wiley	The Handmaid's Tale	Moira is captured in a dyke purge. She is punished for being a lesbian and kept in captivity. She is later able to escape to Canada. We learn that her girlfriend Odette was rounded up in a dyke purge, reclassified as un-woman, and died in the Colony.	
Monique	Zee James	Dear White People	Monique is engaged to her partner Neika Hobbs.	
Carla Monroe	Lizzy Caplan	Das Boot	Carla is the leader of the Résistance in La Rochelle who falls in love with the German translator Simone Strasser.	
Bianca Montgomery	Eden Riegel	All My Children	A periodically recurring character in this drama who has a girlfriend named Reese at one point.	
Molly Montgomery	Sophie Isaacs	Hollyoaks	A host who appears at a murder mystery birthday surprise for India Longford and she becomes close to Charlotte Lau, later having sex with her.	
Renee Montoya	Victoria Cartagena	Gotham	Was in a relationship with Barbara Kean (a bisexual woman) in the past.	
Sian Moore	Georgia Henshaw	Banana	A hardworking and ambitious woman whose dedication leads to tension with Violet, her girlfriend.	
Sian Moore	Georgia Henshaw	Cucumber	A hardworking and ambitious woman whose dedication leads to tension with Violet, her girlfriend.	
Sophie Moore	Meagan Tandy	Batwoman	Sophie was Kate Kane's girlfriend when the two were cadets in a military academy, but their relationship ended when Kate's sexual orientation was discovered, she was discharged, and Sophie chose to stay in the academy and remain closeted. Sophie later becomes a Crow agent and marries Tyler, another Crow agent, but ended their relationship when she came to terms with her sexual orientation. She came out to her mother in episode "Grinning from Ear to Ear" (1x14). In episode "I'll Give You a Clue" (2x13) she identified herself as lesbian to Ryan Wilder.	
Vivienne Moray	Camilla Sparv	Jacqueline Susann's Valley of the Dolls	Vivienne is an artist living in Paris.	
Ellen	Tien Tran	How I Met Your Father	Ellen moves from Iowa to New York City after separating from her wife.	
Ellen Morgan	Ellen DeGeneres	Ellen	The protagonist character of the series whose coming out as lesbian in "The Puppy Episode" (season 4, episode 22/23) became television history.	
Lillian Moss	Sarah Mitich	Murdoch Mysteries	A suffragette, Lillian was disowned by her family for refusing to marry a hand-picked husband. Her real name is Helen Walker and she was once involved with a married woman. She was attracted to Dr. Emily Grace from the moment they met, and she subsequently enters into a romantic relationship with her.	
Blanche Mottershed	Alex Kingston	Upstairs, Downstairs	Dr. Blanche Mottershead is an independent archaeologist.	
Patience "Patsy" Mount	Emerald Fennell	Call the Midwife	In a secret relationship with nurse Delia Busby, with whom she had previously worked with at London Hospital. They both go to the Gateways Club, a private club for lesbians.	
Mulan	Jamie Chung	Once Upon a Time	Although earlier episodes hinted at the possibility of Mulan being romantically interested in Phillip, Aurora's beloved, actress Jamie Chung later clarified that such was never actually the case, and that Mulan's heart unequivocally belonged to Aurora.	
Emma Muller	Kasia Borek	Hand aufs Herz	A student at a Pestalozzi comprehensive school who is in a relationship with Helena.	
Sam Murgatroyd	Megan Parkinson	Ackley Bridge	Introduced in series 2, Sam faces homophobic bullying from students. She then enters a relationship with Nasreen Paracha.	
Jana Murphy	Leslie Bibb	The Following	Ex-wife of Gina Mendez.	
Francesca "Franki" Murray	Arienne Mandi	Love, Classified	Franki is a cardiologist who posts a message under an anonymous name on the dating section of "Classified", an app for local announcements. She takes a chance on a blind date with an anonymous person that seems to be compatible with her. The date turns out to be Taylor Bloom, who had not expected the blind date to be a woman.	
Sam Murray	Heather Peace	Lip Service	A detective sergeant who is cat's girlfriend throughout the series, and a fiercely independent woman who is afraid to show vulnerability.	
Raffi Muskier	Michelle Hurd	Star Trek: Picard	Is in a romantic relationship with Seven of Nine. She is also former Starfleet intelligence officer struggling with substance abuse.	
Myfanwy	Ruth Jones	Little Britain	Myfanwy is the barmaid of a local pub, and best friend of Daffyd Thomas.	
Erica Myles	Anna Friel	The Girlfriend Experience	Erica is the finance director of a Republican super PAC. She enters into a sexual relationship with escort Anna Garner (bisexual), which becomes more serious. She was in a relationship with Darya Esford.	
Rita Nardelli	Federica De Cola	È arrivata la felicità	A security guard. Partner of Valeria Camili.	
Diane Nash	Vanessa Redgrave	Political Animals	Openly-lesbian member of the U.S. Supreme Court and mentor of Elaine Hammond.	
Natália	Amanda Magalhães	3%	Has a crush on Joanna.	
Nicky Nichols	Natasha Lyonne	Orange Is the New Black	Nicky is introduced as a drug addict from a wealthy family and is later shown to be in a complicated relationship with Lorna Morello.	
Cosima Niehaus	Tatiana Maslany	Orphan Black	Cosima labeled herself as a lesbian when she accidentally came out while giving a speech as her sister Alison, and had a recurring love interest named Shay. (She was confirmed to be gay. Series creators had at first been inconsistent in identifying Cosima's sexuality. Graeme Manson once said he thought "Cosima's been 'bisexual' (if you had to codify it), but maybe she's ready to self-identify as gay.)	
Juliet Nightingale	Niamh Blackshaw	Hollyoaks	Initially shown as straight, Juliet realises she is a lesbian when she develops feelings for Peri Lomax.	
P. Ninny	Lena Waithe	Dear White People	Ninny is a butch who at first did not want to admit that she was a lesbian.	
Niylah	Jessica Harmon	The 100	In the premiere of season 3, Niylah has sex with Clarke Griffin. During season 4, Niylah and Clarke are having sex, and she comforts Clarke after a brutal decision.	
Eunice Noon	Gemma Whelan	The End of the F***ing World	A detective constable and partner of Teri Darego.	
Heather Novack	Natalie Paul	The Sinner	Heather is an uncloseted detective.	
Allie Novak	Kate Jenkinson	Wentworth	A prison inmate and friend of Kaz Proctor, who is part of vigilante group which has a vested interest in protecting women. She later has a romance with Bea Smith.	
Alex Nuñez	Deanna Casaluce	Degrassi: The Next Generation	Paige Michalchuk's girlfriend, and a Latina, who struggles to adjust to life after graduation like Marco.	
Odessa	Maddison Jaizani	Into the Badlands	Former Doll (sex slave). Girlfriend of Tilda (bisexual). Saves Tilda's life and helps her escape from The Widow.	
Ofglen / Ofsteven / Emily	Alexis Bledel	The Handmaid's Tale	She is forced to watch the hanging of her lesbian lover for gender treachery. Ofglen is also convicted of being a gender traitor, but instead of death, the government punishes her with female genital mutilation to stop her from having "unnatural" urges. Prior to capture, her wife Sylvia and son were able to escape to Canada.	
Jane Oliver	Nicola Walker	Collateral	Jane is a vicar in a relationship with Linh Xuan Huy, an illegal immigrant.	
Rachel "Bullet" Olmstead	Bex Taylor-Klaus	The Killing	Bullet is a teenager and lives on the street with other runaways. She is trying to find a missing friend and helps the detectives in their search for the killer (season 3). Bullet is murdered by him.	
Kelly Olsen	Azie Tesfai	Supergirl	Kelly is Alex Danvers' love interest, and later her wife when they marry in season 6 episode "Kara".	
Darcy Olsson	Kizzy Edgell	Heartstopper	Darcy is in a relationship Tara Jones, a fellow student.	
Anya Ooms	Caitlin Stasey	For the People	An ATF agent, she is romantically involved with prosecutor Kate Littlejohn.	
Faina Orlov	Anastasia Martin	In From the Cold	A young Russian who falls in love with undercover assassin Anya Petrova.	
Pam	Susie Abromeit	Jessica Jones	Pam was the mistress of Jeri Hogarth. Her affair with Jeri drove Wendy, Jeri's wife, to file for divorce. She was forced to kill a mind-controlled Wendy to save Jeri's life, then ended her relationship with Jeri.	
Nasreen Paracha	Amy-Leigh Hickman	Ackley Bridge	Nasreen comes out to her mother as a lesbian and tells her she is in love with another woman in series 1.	
Vannessa "Van" Palmer	Liv Hewson	Yellowjackets	Goalie in elite high school girls soccer team, the Yellowjackets, whose plane crashes in 1996 on the way to a national championship game. She's in a relationship with teammate Taissa Turner. Van survives the plane crash but is wounded.	
Sukhwinder "Suki" Panesar	Balvinder Sopal	EastEnders	Suki is a closeted lesbian in an abusive relationship with her husband whom she doesn't love. She tries to kiss her employee Honey Mitchell, and later falls in love, and has an affair, with Eve Unwin. When her son, Kheerat, sees them together she tells him that she has had romantic feelings for women her entire life.	
Margot Park	May Hong	Tales of the City	Margot struggled to adapt to the transition of her girlfriend (who changed his name to "Jake"), but eventually left the relationship and became involved with DeDe Halcyon Day.	
Trish Park	Levy Tran	The Haunting of Hill House	Trish is Theodora Crain's girlfriend and whom Theo allows to be touched by. They move in together.	
Patience	Chelsea Tavares	All American	Girlfriend of Tamia ("Coop").	
Gina Patrick	Dannielle Brent	Hollyoaks	A tomboy who prefers casual clothing, has strong views on environmental issues, and is in a romantic relationship with Emily Taylor.	
Patty	Gina Hecht	HeartBeat	Patty is the partner of Marilyn McGrath.	
Helena Peabody	Rachel Shelley	The L Word	Director of the Peabody Foundation, she previously has relationships with Winnie Mann, Tina Kennard, Leigh Ostin, Isabella, Dylan Moreland, Papi, and Dusty.	
Felicia "Snoop" Pearson	Felicia Pearson	The Wire	A young female soldier in Marlo Stanfield's drug dealing organization. Chris Partlow's earliest protégé, and alluded to being a lesbian.	
Gail Peck	Charlotte Sullivan	Rookie Blue	Gail is a police officer. In season 4 she comes out to herself after she meets forensic pathologist Holly Stewart.	
Aline Penhallow	Eileen Li	Shadowhunters	Had a secret relationship with a woman named Carolyn. (Actress Eileen Li has stated that Aline is a lesbian.)	
Adriana Perez	Emily Rios	The Bridge	Newspaper reporter investigating corruption and the murders of women in Juarez. Tells Daniel that she escaped Mexico because she was a lesbian (season 1, episode 3). Girlfriend of Lucy.	
Lara Perkins	Lauren Lee Smith	The L Word	She has dated various women, specifically Dana Fairbanks and Gabby Deveaux, and had a more serious relationship with Alice Pieszecki.	
Petal	Georgina Sadler	The A List	One of the campers on Peregrine Island, Petal is carefree and open about being lesbian. She resists Amber's attempts to control her mind, but in the process is hurt and left broken.	
Laura Peterson	Julianna Margulies	The Morning Show	In 1997 Peterson was outed and subsequently fired from her job as anchor on morning news program Your Day America. Afterwards, she became a highly respected reporter. Describes herself as “a lesbian” to her girlfriend in season two. She has a sexual relationship with and then dates fellow journalist and morning news anchor, Bradley Jackson (bisexual).	
Wendy Peyser	Clea DuVall	American Horror Story: Asylum	Was in a relationship with Lana Winters.	
Kelsey Phillips	Nia Jervier	Dear White People	Kelsey described herself as a "gold star lesbian" in season 2, episode 4.	
Anissa Pierce / Thunder	Nafessa Williams	Black Lightning	A superhero who has a girlfriend named Chenoa.	
Malaya Pineda	Melanie Chandra	Code Black	Dr. Pineda is second-year resident and was once involved in a romantic relationship with a woman when she was a medical school student.	
Gretchen Polk	Jessica Szohr	Complications	ER nurse. In a relationship with Liz.	
Poppy	Claudia Rocafort	Life Sentence	Poppy is the girlfriend of Ida Abbott.	
Bette Porter	Jennifer Beals	The L Word	She had romances with Tina Kennard, Jodi Lerner, Candace Jewell, Alice Pieszecki, among others (original TLW series).	
Bette Porter	Jennifer Beals	The L Word: Generation Q	She had romances with Tina Kennard, Jodi Lerner, Candace Jewell, Alice Pieszecki, among others (original TLW series).	
Alex Portnoy	Brianne Tju	Light as a Feather	Love interest of Peri Boudreaux.	
Bill Potts	Pearl Mackie	Doctor Who	Bill is the first openly and exclusively homosexual, full-time companion character in Doctor Who's history. She falls for Heather in episode 1 of series 10, 'The Pilot'. In the finale episode, Heather returns. When Bill questions her status as a living creature, Heather kisses her, asking whether the kiss felt real or not (it did). From there, Heather makes Bill an immortal like her, and they depart the T.A.R.D.I.S. as a couple to have adventures in time and space for eternity.	
Danica Powers	Ruth Goodwin	Private Eyes	Out rookie police officer. Becomes trainee detective. In a romantic relationship with reporter Kate Bashwa, whom she marries in season 4.	
Sian Powers	Sacha Parkinson	Coronation Street	Was in a relationship with and engaged to Sophie Webster.	
Michelle Prado	Floriana Lima	Allegiance	An FBI agent who is part of a joint CIA-FBI task force and is partnered with CIA analyst Alex O'Connor.	
Donna Prager	Eleanor Matsuura	Cuffs	A police officer, in a relationship with Alice Gove.	
Prisha	Shalini Bathina	Little Voice	She loves a woman in her band and fights with her parents who try to set her up with a man.	

=== Q–T ===
Character	Portrayed by	Program	Notes	Ref(s)
Marion Quade	Madeleine Madden	Picnic at Hanging Rock	She is in a relationship with Greta McGraw.	
Jacqueline "Jackie" Quiñones	Monica Raymund	Hightown	National Marine Fisheries Service Agent in Provincetown, Massachusetts. At the same time that she is trying to solve the murder of a woman, and organized crime involving opioids, she is also struggling with her sobriety.	
Rachel	Ashly Burch	Mythic Quest: Raven's Banquet	A video game tester.	
Maggie Radcliffe	Carolyn Pickles	Broadchurch	Editor of the local newspaper, she becomes romantically involved with Jocelyn Knight.	
Ramona	Judy Reyes	One Day at a Time	Member of Penelope's therapy group.	
Jane Ramos	Rosario Dawson	Jane the Virgin	Is in a relationship with Petra.	
Cate Randa	Anna Sawai	Monarch: Legacy of Monsters	Schoolteacher and survivor of G-Day, Cate discovers that her father had a secret family in Tokyo, and that it has a secret connection to the Titans. Cate ended her relationship with Dani, a fellow teacher at her school, after Dani asked Cate to move in with her, but she could not make such a commitment.	
Svenja Rasmussen	Katharina Schlothauer	Der Flensburg-Krimi	Svenja is a police detective investigating in Flensburg.	
Logan Rawlings	Ashley Tisdale	Young and Hungry	A magazine editor who is romantically attracted to a straight woman named Gabi.	
Reagan	Yvette Monreal	Faking It	An edgy, hip, and rebellious waiter who is fiercy out and proud.	
Jocelyn Reyes	Andrea Sixtos	East Los High	She is outed.	
Eva Rhodes	Alex Paxton-Beesley	The Bold Type	A conservative Republican lawyer and Kat Edison's love interest.	
Kizmin Rider	Rose Rollins	Bosch	The girlfriend of Grace Billets and a detective with the LAPD.	
Carla Rinaldi	Tania Raymonde	Death Valley	Rinaldi is revealed to be lesbian in episode "Zombie Fights", when she makes out with barmaid Julia.	
Maia Rindell	Rose Leslie	The Good Fight	She is in a relationship with a woman named Amy Breslin.	
Liz Ritschard	Delia Mayer	Tatort	Ritschard is a police inspector that investigated between 2008 and 2019 in the episodes set in Lucerne.	
Yolanda "Junkchain" Rivas	Shakira Barrera	GLOW	Also known as Yo-Yo, she is a stripper who joins GLOW after Cherry departs for another television series, and Arthie becomes attracted to her and the two later become a couple.	
Zoë Rivas	Ana Golja	Degrassi: Next Class	Briefly dates two male friends, Miles and Drew. Zoë realizes she is gay when she falls in love with Grace Cardinal, although she is only seen as a friend. She comes out to boyfriend Winston in season 3. She later becomes Rasha Zuabi's girlfriend. Her mother does not accept her sexual orientation and kicks her out.	
Zoë Rivas	Ana Golja	Degrassi: The Next Generation	Briefly dates two male friends, Miles and Drew. Zoë realizes she is gay when she falls in love with Grace Cardinal, although she is only seen as a friend. She comes out to boyfriend Winston in season 3. She later becomes Rasha Zuabi's girlfriend. Her mother does not accept her sexual orientation and kicks her out.	
Arizona Robbins	Jessica Capshaw	Grey's Anatomy	She had several relationships, the main one with her ex-wife Callie Torres. She also had relationships with Lauren Boswell (with whom she cheated on Callie), Eliza Minnick and currently has a relationship with Carina DeLuca. In season 9, Arizona and Callie raise a baby together.	
Roberta	Anna Ferzetti	The Ignorant Angels	Michele's friend and Annamaria's girlfriend.	
Roberta "Bob"	Carlease Burke	Shameless	A truck driver. She becomes involved with Monica Gallagher.	
Binnie Roberts	Sophie Langham	EastEnders	Binnie is in a relationship with Della.	
Tess Roberts	Fiona Button	Lip Service	Tess is in a relationship with Cat.	
Maya Robertson	Laura Donnelly	Hex	She is killed by Malachi.	
Robin	Tiera Skovbye	Once Upon a Time	Revealed to be in love with Alice (the daughter of Captain Hook and Mother Gothel) in episode "The Eighth Witch". She begins a relationship with her.	
Christine Rodd	Trudy Hellier	Neighbours	After the break up of her marriage to Allan, Christine realizes that she is gay and has a hard time telling her ex-husband and their daughter, Pepper.	
Maddie Rooney	Dove Cameron	Liv and Maddie	Liv's identical twin sister and the second eldest child of the Rooney family. (She was confirmed as a lesbian by Cameron in a Twitter post.)	
Root	Amy Acker	Person of Interest	A psychopathic hacker who is determined to gain access to The Machine, whose real name is Samantha "Sam" Groves.	
Willow Rosenberg	Alyson Hannigan	Buffy the Vampire Slayer	Though only showing attraction to and having relationships with male characters in the first three seasons, she begins dating Tara Maclay in season 4. Identifies as a lesbian in Season 5. In two long-term lesbian relationships during the series, including the first long-term lesbian relationship of a lead character on network television.	
Pippy Rosewood	Gabrielle Dennis	Rosewood	A pathology expert who is a relationship with TMI.	
Molly Ross	Sara Thompson	Burden of Truth	Molly is in a relationship with Luna Spence.	
Wendy Ross-Hogarth	Robin Weigert	Jessica Jones	Wife of Jeri Hogarth. She filed for divorce when she discovered Jeri's affair with her secretary, Pam. Wendy was a doctor at a free clinic and financially supported Jeri while the latter was in law school.	
Eve Rothlo	Famke Janssen	How to Get Away with Murder	Notably had a past relationship with fellow defense attorney Annalise Keating. When talking about their past and how a part of her is still in love with Annalise, Eve remarks that she has "been with plenty of other women" since the end of their relationship years ago.	
Dalia Oprah Royce	Carly Chaikin	Suburgatory	In the show, it was revealed that she dated a woman.	
Simone Russell	Lena Cardwell / Chrystee Pharris / Cathy Jenéen Doe	Passions	Said to be the first African-American lesbian character in broadcast daytime drama.	
Ruthie	Lily Newmark	Sex Education	Has sexual relationship problems with her girlfriend Tanya, with whom she has been best friends since childhood. Turns to Otis' sex clinic for help.	
Sabina	Jeananne Goossen	Coroner	Dating Alison Trent.	
Sabrina	Lulu Brud	Pretty Little Liars	Briefly dated Emily Fields and was a manager of a local restaurant, but later drifted apart from Emily.	
Saint	Sarah-Jane Potts	Sugar Rush	Kim's girlfriend in season 2.	
Layla Salim	Nicole Chamoun	Kick	Layla is a college student in a relationship with Jackie.	
Peach Salinger	Shay Mitchell	You	A wealthy and influential closeted socialite and Beck's best friend, whom she met at Brown University, and is secretly in love with her.	
Sally	Catherine Shepherd	Sally4Ever	Sally comes out when she meets Emma and becomes involved in a relationship with her.	
Sam	Jeanna Han	Scream Queens	Known by the nickname "Predator Lez". In love with Chanel #3. She is killed by the Red Devil.	
Samantha	Tara Joshi	Shadowhunters	Girlfriend of Ollie Wilson.	
Jessie Sammler	Evan Rachel Wood	Once and Again	Daughter of Rick Sammler. She is shy and emotionally fragile and later begins dating an upperclassman named Katie Singer. Their romance has been called the first teen lesbian romance on American network television.	
Siuan Sanche	Sophie Okonedo	The Wheel of Time	Siuan, the Amyrlin Seat, shares a secret forbidden love with aes sedai Moiraine Damodred.	
Talia Sandoval	Miranda Rae Mayo	Pretty Little Liars	A cook at a local restaurant who had feelings for Emily Fields but actually had a husband named Eric Mendoza, implying she may be bisexual.	
Vel Sartha	Faye Marsay	Andor	Vel is the leader of the rebels on planet Aldhani. She is in a relationship with Cinta Kaz.	
Maggie Sawyer	Floriana Lima	Supergirl	She has a girlfriend in one of the episodes, and acts as Alex's love interest and the catalyst to her coming out. (The comics character she is based on is lesbian as well.)	
Tanja Schildknecht	Sybille Waury	Lindenstraße	Lesbian who was married to Dr. Dressler and discovered her homosexuality when having an affair with Sonia Besirsky.	
Jackie Schneider	Romi Trower	Kick	Jackie is in a relationship with Layla.	
Vivienne "Scotty" Scott	Letitia Wright	Cucumber	Scotty, while caring for her sick mother, falls in love with a girl who works at a supermarket.	
Vivienne "Scotty" Scott	Letitia Wright	Banana	Scotty, while caring for her sick mother, falls in love with a girl who works at a supermarket.	
Rose Seithathi	Florence Kasumba	Deutschland 86	She is in a relationship with Lenora Rauch.	
Callie Senate	Molly Parker	Goliath	She seduces Michelle McBride (bisexual) and begins a lesbian affair with her.	
Ava Sharpe	Jes Macallan	Legends of Tomorrow	Mentions that she is 'not really the husband kind' and has a relationship with Sara Lance.	
Irena Shaw	Zoie Palmer	Dark Matter	In episode 3x10, Dr. Irena Shaw is seen as having been in love, and in a romantic relationship, with Rebecca (a.k.a. Portia Lin / Two). Rebecca used Irena's image to create the Android.	
Leslie Shay	Lauren German	Chicago Fire	An EMT in a relationship with Devon. Was once in a relationship with Clarice, a bisexual woman.	
Siobhan Sheehan	Angourie Rice	Mare of Easttown	The teenage daughter of Mare, Siobhan is dating Becca, a member of her band. She also goes on a date with Anne Harris, the college radio dj.	
Sharla Shepard	Christina Moses	Condor	An FBI agent. Girlfriend of Sarah Tan.	
Alexis Simms	Sepideh Moafi	Falling Water	NYPD homicide detective. In a relationship with Christy.	
Ximena Sinfuego	Lisseth Chavez	The Fosters	In episode 5x10, "Sanctuary", Ximena comes out to Callie.	
Katie Singer	Mischa Barton	Once and Again	She dates a shy and emotionally fragile girl named Jessie Sammler.	
Bea Smith	Danielle Cormack	Wentworth	Bea has a romance with a woman named Allie Novak.	
Sofie	Julie Zangenberg	Heartless	Sofie is a succubus that must feed from the life force of humans to survive. If she feeds too much and drains her prey, her victim bursts into flames and is incinerated. She meets Emilie and for the first time in her life feels attraction and falls in love.	
Rose Solano	Bridget Regan	Jane the Virgin	A crime lord who falls in love with Luisa, and the main antagonist of the series.	
Veronica "Vero" Sole	Carolina Cerezuela	Hospital Central	Vero is a psychiatrist who dated a woman named Maca.	
Sarah Souders	Andrea Parker	Red Band Society	Mother of Kara. Married to Daniella.	
Serena Southerlyn	Elisabeth Röhm	Law & Order	An assistant district attorney who has some conservative viewpoints. In her last episode, she explicitly states she is a lesbian to Arthur Branch.	
Luna Spence	Star Slade	Burden of Truth	Luna is a First Nation native in a relationship with Molly.	
Ali Spencer	Kelli Hollis	Emmerdale	She leaves her husband and flat on the Hotten estate for a new start in the village with her children and her girlfriend, Ruby Haswell.	
Karen Spencer	Joanna Johnson	The Bold and the Beautiful	In a relationship with a woman named Danielle and later a main stakeholder in a publishing company.	
Maya St. Germain	Bianca Lawson	Pretty Little Liars	The first serious girlfriend of Emily Fields. Her other girlfriends included Sara Harvey, who was struggling to recognize her sexuality, and they were together until Sara was killed off.	
Stacy-Anne	D. Ajane Carlton	195 Lewis		
Norma Starkey	Dystin Johnson	Shameless (U.K.)	A lorry driver who was previously Monica Gallagher's lover after her split from Frank Gallagher.	
Niki Stevens	Kate French	The L Word	A closeted famous movie star who had relationships with Jenny Schecter, Shane McCutcheon, Jimmi, and Paris Hilton.	
Holly Stewart	Aliyah O'Brien	Rookie Blue	Holly is a forensic pathologist and becomes involved in a romantic relationship with Gail Peck (seasons 4 and 5).	
Annaliese Stilman	Lena Olin	Mindhunter	Dr. Annaliese Stilman is the head of the psychology department at a Boston university. She was in a relationship with Wendy Carr until Wendy accepted the FBI's offer to join their team as a behavioral science consultant at Quantico. Annaliese was more open in public with her feelings for Wendy and what they were to each other.	
Frankie Stone	Elizabeth Hendrickson	All My Children	A wisecracking tomboy with feminine sex appeal, and was killed off. (The character was brought back as her twin sister, Maggie Stone).	
Maggie Stone	Elizabeth Hendrickson	All My Children	She fell in love with Maggie, with Maggie initially maintaining that she is only interested in men, and the two eventually become girlfriends, though heartbreak follows.	
Simone Strasser	Vicky Krieps	Das Boot	Simone is a translator for the Gestapo who falls in love with Carla Monroe, the leader of the Résistance.	
Della Street	Juliet Rylance	Perry Mason	Street is Mason's loyal secretary and a closeted lesbian. (A reinterpretation of the original character from the 1950s series.)	
Joanie Stubbs	Kim Dickens	Deadwood	Falls in love with Jane Canary (Calamity Jane).	
Joanie Stubbs	Kim Dickens	Deadwood: The Movie	In the movie, set in 1889, she and Jane became estranged during that passage of time. Jane returns to Deadwood in search of Joanie and to try to win her back. They are reunited and their relationship is rekindled.	
Carol Sturka	Rhea Seehorn	Pluribus	The protagonist of the series, Carol is in a long-term relationship with Helen, and then Zosia.	
Sophia Swanson	Michelle Ang	Underemployed	An aspiring writer who has sex with a woman named Lauren and later with a woman named Miles, while dating a bartender named Natalie.	
Sylvia	Clea DuVall	The Handmaid's Tale	Wife of Ofglen, she escaped to Canada with their son.	
Judy Talbot	Daisy Head	The Sandman	Judy has been trying to reconcile with her girlfriend (Donna) after an argument that turned physical, but has not been able to contact her. She becomes one of John Dee's victims.	
Tamika	Clarke Hollingsworth	13 Reasons Why	Girlfriend of Courtney Crimsen.	
Sarah Tan	Ellen Wong	Condor	Girlfriend of FBI agent Sharla Shepard, and work confidante of Joe Turner.	
Tanya	Alice Hewkin	Sex Education	Has hangups about sex with Ruthie, her girlfriend and best friend since childhood.	
Lucy Tara	Yasmine Al-Bustami	NCIS: Hawaiʻi	An NCIS agent. Had a girlfriend in high school named Marcella. Lucy is in a relationship with FBI Special Agent Kate Whistler.	
Zoe Tate	Leah Bracknell	Emmerdale	Involved in many major storylines during her time on the show, including coming out as gay and a battle with schizophrenia. (Zoe became the first lesbian character in a British soap opera when she came out in 1993.)	
Tathiana	Lorenza Izzo	Casual	Girlfriend of Laura Meyers (bisexual).	
Emily Taylor	Lorna Pegler	Hollyoaks	At university studying to be a veterinary surgeon, later came out, and battles with schizophrenia.	
Teresa	Rachel Wilson	Bomb Girls	Teresa is a Women's Army Corps sergeant. She flirts with and seduces Betty McRae. They eventually become involved in a romantic relationship.	
Mandy Thomas	Rachael Blake	Home and Away	A professional writer who meets with Shannon.	
Rae Thomas	Jossara Jinnaro	Passions	Simone Russell's first and only girlfriend.	
Nonnie Thompson	Kimmy Shields	Insatiable	Nonnie is attracted to Patty.	
Ezri Tigan	Nicole de Boer	Star Trek: Deep Space Nine	The mirror universe lesbian version of Ezri Dax, is referred to as not being interested in men and has a romantic and sexual relationship with the mirror universe's version of Kira Nerys, who is bisexual. The two women share an on-screen kiss and Ezri flirts with other female characters.	
Camilla Torres	Tatiana Maslany	Orphan Black	She asks Dr. Delphine Cormier out to dinner. Delphine confirms this to a mirthful Cosima when she enters the room after Camilla leaves.	
Liz Tremayne	Maria Sten	Swamp Thing	In a relationship with Margaux.	
Alison Trent	Tamara Podemski	Coroner	Assistant to Coroner Jenny Cooper. In a relationship with Sabina.	
Taissa Turner	Jasmin Savoy Brown (teenager) Tawny Cypress (adult)	Yellowjackets	In high school she was in a relationship with Yellowjackets teammate Vannessa Palmer. Twenty-five years later, Taissa is an out politician married to Simone.	

=== U–Z ===
Character	Portrayed by	Program	Notes	Ref(s)
Desiree Upton	Simone Robertson	Home and Away	She had a romantic attraction on a woman named Gypsy.	
Uriel	Katrine De Candole	Dominion	An archangel who is one of the eldest of the Archangels and is later revealed to be Arika's lover.	
Eve Unwin	Heather Peace	EastEnders	Eve joins the show as Stacey Slater's prison wife and later falls in love with Suki Panesar.	
Laure Valère	Alix Poisson	Les Revenants	A constable of the town and former ex-girlfriend of Julie Meyer.	
Saray Vargas	Alba Flores	Vis a vis	Ex-girlfriend of Estefania "Rizos" Kabila. When her family learns of her sexual orientation, they shun her for a period before forcing her to marry a man. Once she is released from prison, she is shown to be living with a female romantic partner (Season 4, episode 8: "La marea amarilla").	
Madame Vastra	Neve McIntosh	Doctor Who	She is married to Jenny Flint. This is confirmed in the episode The Snowmen.	
Alex Vause	Laura Prepon	Orange Is the New Black	Piper Chapman's principal love interest. Alex and Piper were ex-girlfriends prior to their imprisonment in Litchfield Penitentiary. In season 5, episode 12, Piper asks Alex to marry her and Alex accepts.	
Melanie "Mel" Vera	Melonie Diaz	Charmed	Mel, a graduate student, is in a relationship with Nico Hamada, then Jada Shields and Ruby. She has the ability to "freeze time".	
Margot Verger	Katharine Isabelle	Hannibal	A patient of Dr. Hannibal Lecter. Has a wife named Alana Bloom.	
Veronica	K Callan	All in the Family	Veronica was the long time partner of Edith's cousin Liz.	
Vi	Rosie O'Donnell	A League of Their Own	Butch owner and bartender of the underground lesbian and gay bar in Rockford.	
Violet	Hannah John-Kamen	Cucumber	Violet is Sian's girlfriend.	
Violet	Hannah John-Kamen	Banana	Violet is Sian's girlfriend.	
Saskia Vogels	Leen Roels	Professor T.	Saskia is an Inspector with the Federal Judicial Police Antwerp.	
Anna Volovodov	Elizabeth Mitchell	The Expanse	Minister and head pastor of UN congregation. In a same-sex marriage with Namono 'Nono' and has a daughter, Nami.	
Nikki Wade	Mandana Jones	Bad Girls	In a relationship with Officer Helen Stewart.	
Hannah Wagner	Jana Klinge	Nord bei Nordwest	Police inspector. After arriving in Schwanitz, she's asked if her husband is coming and replies "I don't have a husband, I like women." ("Ich hab' keinen Mann, ich mag Frauen.")	
Ann Walker	Christine Bottomley	The Secret Diaries of Miss Anne Lister	Ann is Anne Lister's lover. She accepts Lister's proposal to live together as partners, followed by a Church blessing in which she becomes her "wife".	
Ann Walker	Sophie Rundle	Gentleman Jack	Ann is Anne Lister's lover. She accepts Lister's proposal to live together as partners, followed by a Church blessing in which she becomes her "wife".	
Martha Walker	Harriet Walter	Silo	Electrical engineer who mentors Juliette Nichols. She used to be married to Carla McLain, the Head of Supply.	
Christine Walter	Katy Karrenbauer	Hinter Gittern – Der Frauenknast	Walter is an imprisoned bank robber and one of the most important characters of the series.	
May-Li Wang	Stacy Liu	The Dumping Ground	May-Li is a care worker and in series 3, May-Li is revealed to be in a relationship with another woman and had adopted children.	
Connie Ward	Rachael Elizabeth	Home Fires	Connie was in a secret relationship with colleague Teresa Fenchurch.	
Chris Warner	Tracey Ullman	Tracey Takes On...	A character written and frequently performed by actress-comedian Tracey Ullman. Chris is girlfriend to pro-golfer Midge Dexter (Julie Kavner). Chris and Midge come out publicly in season 1, episode "Romance"; Chris is kidnapped and sent to a "homosexual de-programming center" Straight Ways in season 3, episode "Religion." (Tracey Takes On... took home GLAAD Media Awards for both episodes (1996, 1999).)	
Suzanne "Crazy Eyes" Warren	Uzo Aduba	Orange Is the New Black	Susanne fell for Piper Chapman when Piper arrived in the prison. She is in a romantic relationship with Maureen Kukudio.	
Poussey Washington	Samira Wiley	Orange Is the New Black	Poussey's feelings for Tasha "Taystee" Jefferson were unrequited. She developed a relationship with Brook Soso. She dies in a later season of the show.	
Crickett Watts	Brandi Burkhardt	Hart of Dixie	Crickett came out to everyone just as she was about to renew her vows with Stanley Watts. After this, she started dating Jaysene.	
Ellen Waverly (m. Wilson)	Jodi Balfour	For All Mankind	Closeted astronaut. In a marriage of convenience with closeted gay astronaut Larry Wilson. Was involved with Pam Horton, but the relationship ended when Ellen chose to marry Wilson so she could hide her sexual orientation and save her career.	
Kerry Weaver	Laura Innes	ER	The only lesbian character on NBC at the time she was included in the series.	
Sophie Webster	Brooke Vincent	Coronation Street	Sophie has been in relationships with Sian Powers and Maddie Heath.	
Wen-fang Weng	Hsieh Ying-xuan	Wave Makers	Weng is a political consultant married to Chu Li-ya, a well-to-do successful businesswoman. Although Weng's father joined his political party in supporting same-sex marriage, he has difficulty accepting Weng's homosexuality and her relationship with Li-ya.	
Bridget Westfall	Libby Tanner	Wentworth	A forensic psychologist who works with the inmates at Wentworth and she has feelings for Franky Doyle, which Franky reciprocates.	
Amanda Weston	Anna Akana	Stitchers	The girlfriend of Camille Engelson.	
Kate Whistler	Tori Anderson	NCIS: Hawaiʻi	An FBI agent. Had a girlfriend named Cara, and is now in a relationship with NCIS agent Lucy Tara.	
Mimi Whiteman	Marisa Tomei	Empire	A wealthy venture capitalist who invests $250 million in the hostile takeover of Empire Entertainment.	
Ryan Wilder / Batwoman	Javicia Leslie	Batwoman	Finds the Batwoman suit after Kate Kane disappears, and assumes the Batwoman identity.	
Ellie Williams	Bella Ramsey	The Last of Us	Ellie is openly lesbian, with her love story with Riley explored in the series and later a relationship with Dina.	
Lisa Williams	Kate Lyn Sheil	House of Cards	Involved with Rachel Posner.	
Nina Williams	Tyla Abercrumbie	The Chi	The former girlfriend of Karen and later married a woman named Dre.	
Carol Willick	Jane Sibbett	Friends	Girlfriend of Susan Bunch. They marry in the season 2 episode "The One with the Lesbian Wedding".	
Devonne Wilson	Gia Crovatin	Hightown	Ex-girlfriend of agent Jackie Quiñones.	
Freya Wilson	Lu Corfield	Doctors	Dr. Wilson is in a relationship with Mandy Marquez.	
Henrietta "Hen" Wilson	Aisha Hinds	9-1-1	"Hen" is married to Karen Wilson. They are together raising the son of Hen's ex-girlfriend (Eva).	
Karen Wilson	Tracie Thoms	9-1-1	Karen is married to Henrietta Wilson.	
Olivia 'Ollie' Wilson	Alexandra Ordolis	Shadowhunters	Ollie is a detective and in a relationship with Samantha.	
Lana Winters	Sarah Paulson	American Horror Story: Asylum	Lana was locked in Briarcliff Asylum for being a lesbian and was in a secret relationship with Wendy Peyser.	
Hillary Winthrop	Ashley Hinshaw	Workaholics	In a relationship with Jackie and brings along a "disgusting boyfriend" so that her father will accept her lesbian relationship.	
Camile Wray	Ming-Na Wen	Stargate Universe	Her character searches for a way back to Earth and her partner, Sharon.	
Hailey Yarner	Chanelle Peloso	The Bletchley Circle: San Francisco	Comes out to Iris Bearden in episode "Iron in War" (1x06). She tells her, "I like women. In ways that I shouldn't."	
Joanne Yates	Kimberley Sustad	Travelers	FBI agent in a same-sex marriage.	
Meh Yewll	Trenna Keating	Defiance	An Indogene and doctor in the town of Defiance. Her wife Lev, a scientist, killed herself (season 2, episode 5).	
Cath York	Alicia Gardiner	Deadloch	Cath is a veterinarian. She is married to Dulcie Collins.	
Yorkie	Mackenzie Davis	Black Mirror (Note: Episode: "San Junipero".)	Yorkie is living in a simulated reality within which she meets Kelly, a bisexual woman. They fall in love and Yorkie enters into a romantic relationship with her.	
Yumiko	Alexandra Wilcke	Kommt Mausi raus?!	Partner of Kati	
Yumiko	Eleanor Matsuura	The Walking Dead	Partner of Magna.	
Yuri	Rae Leonne Allen	195 Lewis	A philandering playgirl.	
Irène Ziegler	Julia Piaton	The Frozen Dead	Ziegler is the captain of the St. Martin detective squad and openly lesbian. She is in a committed relationship with Greta.	
Zoe	Jeanne Balibar	Irma Vep	Costumer designer for the TV production.	
Rasha Zuabi	Dalia Yegavian	Degrassi: Next Class	Zoë Rivas' Muslim girlfriend.	

== See also ==
- List of feature films with lesbian characters
- List of gay characters in television
- List of bisexual characters in television
- List of transgender characters in television
- List of fictional lesbian characters
- List of dramatic television series with LGBT characters: 1960s–2000s
- List of dramatic television series with LGBT characters: 2010–2015
- List of dramatic television series with LGBT characters: 2016–2019
- List of dramatic television series with LGBT characters: 2020s
- List of comedy television series with LGBT characters
- List of LGBT characters in soap operas
- List of LGBT characters in radio and podcasts
- List of reality television programs with LGBT cast members
