= Steve Elliot =

Fictional character from the BBC soap opera EastEnders

- EastEnders character
- Portrayed by: Mark Monero
- Duration: 1991–1996
- First appearance: Episode 700; 22 October 1991
- Last appearance: Episode 1249; 12 February 1996
In-universe information
- Occupation: Chef; Barman

Steve Elliot is a fictional character from the BBC soap opera EastEnders, played by Mark Monero between 8 October 1991 and 12 February 1996.

== Creation and development ==
Steve Elliot was the second of only two regular characters to be introduced into EastEnders in 1991, the other was Rachel Kominski (Jacquetta May). Described by writer Colin Brake as a "young black cook with ambitions to see the world", Steve was originally paired storyline-wise with Ian Beale (Adam Woodyatt) when he became involved in his catering service "The Meal Machine", as well as the character Hattie Tavernier (Michelle Gayle) with whom he had a relationship.

From 1991 to 1994, Steve made two exits and returns to the soap. In 1993, The Independent reported that the character was being written out of EastEnders. Steve was one of several characters to be written out that year in what the press dubbed the "Albert Square Massacre". However, as Colin Brake summarised in the book EastEnders: The First 10 Years, "since like Frank Sinatra [Steve] always seems to make another comeback, perhaps we will list this as a temporary disappearance." In the storyline, Steve, faced with an imminent marriage to Hattie which he did not want to commit to, jilted her, not knowing she was pregnant with his child. Actress Michelle Gayle quit the serial towards the end of 1993, and Steve was used in an unrequited-lust storyline with a new character, Della Alexander (Michelle Joseph) upon his return early in 1994. Initially, writers lead the audience to believe that Della was designed to be a new love interest for Steve, however as the plot developed it was revealed that she was actually the soap's first lesbian character.

Steve Elliot has been described by author Kate Lock as "a bit of a dilettante where women were concerned", while Josephine Munroe has described him as "laid-back". Steve's portrayer Mark Monero has described Steve as a transient character because he did not have a screen family. This, he says, enabled him to have more autonomy in how the character developed. BBC News reporter Katy Lewis has suggested that although Steve Elliot was a black character in the soap, his ethnicity was never important with regard to storylines stating, "[Steve] lived [his] life and had [...] storylines and it didn’t matter what colour he was." Monero has said that he tried his best "not to stick to any kind of stereotypes, except the fact that Steve was a Cockney. He was in EastEnders and he lived in the East End. It just so happened that he was black. I tried not to make it a big deal so after a while [the producers] let me have that freedom."

The character remained on-screen till February 1996 when he fled after getting on the wrong side of some mobsters. In reality, Monero quit the soap. In 2006, he revealed why: "I didn't think I was going to be in EastEnders that long. I was 23 [when I started] and was working quite a bit before I joined. I never really watched that much television but I knew of it. It's not the route I expected to go down, but I did and enjoyed most of it. Then, it was a little bit like being in school. People weren't as relaxed as they should be in TV. You're only acting, so it was like saying 'get a grip' to them." When asked about his exit, Monero commented, "I drove off into the darkness. I can’t remember why now, but they gave me a really nice car to drive off in. It was a Mercedes, a lovely old classic merc. It was really nice. I suppose that leaves it a bit open ended. I could come back - or maybe not!"

== Storylines ==
Steve is first seen in Albert Square in October 1991 as an old school friend of Hattie Tavernier (Michelle Gayle) and Sam Mitchell (Danniella Westbrook). He initially works as a pizza chef, but his talents are noticed by Ian Beale (Adam Woodyatt) who quickly gives him a job as head chef at his catering business, The Meal Machine. In 1992, after much flirting, Steve and Hattie start dating. Unlike Hattie, Steve is not keen on commitment but accepts her marriage proposal on New Year's Eve 1992. Hattie makes plans for the wedding but Steve has second thoughts when he loses his job and begins to listen to Mandy Salter (Nicola Stapleton), who persuades him he is not ready for marriage. He decides to take a job as a chef on an ocean liner but neglects to tell Hattie that the wedding is off. Unknown to him, Hattie is pregnant; she follows him and tries to persuade him to stay but doesn't tell him that she is pregnant, fearing he would stay from obligation and not love. Steve decides to leave anyway. Hattie is heartbroken and has a miscarriage soon after.

In 1994, Steve returns to Walford and hopes to reunite with Hattie but learns that she has left Albert Square. After an ill-fated attempt to win her back, Steve resigns himself to the fact that she is gone. Grant Mitchell (Ross Kemp) gives him a job as a barman in The Queen Victoria public house and Steve falls for new arrival, Della Alexander (Michelle Joseph). Della moves to the square to open a hair salon and coaxes Steve into becoming a partner in the business, named 'Kool for Kutz'. After some problems at home, Della moves into the Queen Vic with Steve and he starts seeing her as more than just a business partner. He actively pursues her but is shocked to discover that she is a lesbian when he catches her in bed with her girlfriend, Binnie Roberts (Sophie Langham). Steve throws Della out in disgust, prompting a feud between him and Binnie.

In 1995, Steve buys shares in the Bridge Street cafe and opens a night bistro, sparking a feud between him and Ian as Ian sees him as competition and tries to get him closed down. Later in the year, Steve is approached by a criminal firm who talk him into holding an illegal gambling night in his cafe. Several Walford residents attend, including Mark Fowler (Todd Carty), who gets lucky and wins a sizable sum. Mark promptly gives some of his winnings to his father, Arthur Fowler (Bill Treacher), to repay a loan but Arthur is later falsely accused of embezzlement, and he is assumed guilty due, in part, to the money Mark gave him. Steve is faced with a dilemma when asked by his friend, Mark, to testify as a character witness for his father and corroborate Arthur's story about the origins of the money. Admitting to the illegal gambling will threaten Steve's trading licence and implicate the criminal firm who use stolen money to fund the gambling. When the firm find out that Steve is going to testify and implicate them, they try to dissuade him. After idle threats fail, they take a different approach and kidnap Steve's girlfriend, Lydia (Marlaine Gordon) instead. Steve is frantic but he eventually finds her distraught after the mobsters had attempted to drown her. They threaten to kill Lydia if Steve testifies. Fearful for their lives, Steve packs his things and he and Lydia leave Walford in February 1996.
