= Binnie Roberts =

Fictional character from the BBC soap opera EastEnders

- EastEnders character
- Portrayed by: Sophie Langham
- Duration: 1994–1995
- First appearance: Episode 985; 9 June 1994
- Last appearance: Episode 1132; 16 May 1995
In-universe information
- Occupation: Barmaid

Binnie Roberts is a character from the BBC soap opera EastEnders, played by Sophie Langham from 9 June 1994 until 16 May 1995. Binnie is an out and proud lesbian, which is in stark contrast to her shy and retiring girlfriend, Della Alexander (Michelle Joseph).

== Character creation and development ==
Binnie and her girlfriend Della Alexander were the first lesbian couple to be featured in EastEnders. Their inclusion was an attempt to portray positive examples of characters who just happen to be homosexual. Their lesbian kiss accounted for some 45 percent of viewer complaints to the BBC regarding EastEnders in 1994; provoking more complaints than any other television programme that year (according to research published by the Broadcasting Standards Council in 1995).

In 2005 their lesbian kiss was featured in E4's X Rated: Top 20 Most Controversial TV Moments; a documentary examining British TV's most talked about on-screen moments. It was placed at number 11 in the chart and, according to the poll, received an estimated 486 viewer complaints and 180 column inches in the British press.

In 1995, bisexual actress Pam St. Clement, who plays Pat Evans, was asked if EastEnders' first lesbian storyline suffered from "seeming to follow the pack rather than lead it". She commented, "I think they realised there was something missing, but having given themselves that brief they didn't know what the fuck to do with it. I think Michael Cashman made Colin Russell so successful because he is a gay man. I'd never argue for somebody having to be a part to do it – you don't have to be a murderer to play Othello – and I think the two young girls [who played Della and Binnie] did what they could, but they couldn't really give the programme any help."

== Storylines ==
Binnie arrives in Albert Square in June 1994. She is the secret girlfriend of hairdresser Della Alexander (Michelle Joseph). Whilst Della prefers to keep her sexuality hidden, Binne is out and proud and wants everyone to know. She refuses to put up with anyone's bigotry and defends her sexuality to anyone that dares to pass judgement.

Della had been in Walford for a few months before Binnie's arrival, and in this time she'd sparked up a close, flirtatious relationship with the barman, Steve Elliot (Mark Monero). Steve has become a partner in Della's hair salon and has begun to think that he and Della will soon be more than just friends. Binnie is adamant that Della should tell Steve about her sexuality, but Della finds the prospect of 'coming out' extremely daunting. Several days later, the situation is brought to a head prematurely, when Steve accidentally walks in on Della and Binnie in bed together. Steve is furious, as he feels Della has been leading him on. He throws her out of his home, prompting several arguments between him and Binnie. Steve and Binnie are sworn enemies thereafter, although they do manage to put aside their differences later in the year.

Binnie and Della soon move into a bedsit on the Square and Binnie gets a job working as a barmaid in The Queen Victoria public house alongside Steve. She and Steve bicker constantly, mainly because Steve refuses to accept that Della is gay and regularly tries it on with her, leaving Binnie fuming with jealousy. More problems arise when Natalie Price (Lucy Speed) hears a rumour that Binnie and Della are lesbians. She starts telling anyone who cares to listen about how disgusting and unnatural the pair are. This reaction increases Della's trepidation about living as a lesbian and she starts denying the rumours; claiming that she'd never slept with a woman before in her life. Infuriated by Della's shame, Binnie threatens to leave the Square, which forces Della to prioritise. In order to convince Binnie to stay, Della kisses her in the middle of Bridge Street, which really gives the gossips something to talk about.

Binnie spends most of her time on the Square trying to force Della to conform to her lesbian ideals. She regularly pressurises her to 'come out' to her mother and generally bosses her around making demands, which often causes blazing rows between them. Despite this, Binnie usually has Della's best interests at heart and the two genuinely love each other.

In 1995, Binnie and Della decide that they have had enough of Walford and they decide to make a new start of things in Ibiza. They both depart in May 1995.

== See also ==
- List of LGBT characters in television
- List of soap operas with LGBT characters
