= Anne+ (film) =

- Promotional release poster
- Directed by: Valerie Bisscheroux
- Written by: Maud Wiemeijer
- Produced by: Suzan de Swaan; Rachel van Bommel
- Starring: Hanna van Vliet; Georgina Verbaan
- Cinematography: Cor Booy
- Edited by: Augustine Huijsser
- Music by: Tess van der Velde
- Distributed by: Dutch FilmWorks
- Release date: 14 October 2021
- Running time: 94 minutes
- Country: Netherlands
- Language: Dutch
- Box office: $299,104

Anne+ (also known as Anne+: The Film) is a 2021 Dutch drama film directed by Valerie Bisscheroux and written by Maud Wiemeijer. It is a continuation of the popular television series Anne+. The film was released in Dutch cinemas in October 2021 and got a worldwide release on Netflix in February 2022. The film has a role for non-binary actor Thorn Roos de Vries making them the first non-binary actor with a major role in a Dutch film.

De Volkskrant gave the film 3 out of 5 stars, saying it felt more like a long television episode than a film. The film played at the 2022 Netherlands Film Festival.
