= Della Alexander =

Fictional character in the soap opera EastEnders

- EastEnders character
- Portrayed by: Michelle Joseph
- Duration: 1994–1995
- First appearance: Episode 948; 1 March 1994
- Last appearance: Episode 1132; 16 May 1995
In-universe information
- Occupation: Hairdresser
- Mother: Alice Alexander
- Sisters: Jenny Alexander

Della Alexander is a fictional character from the BBC soap opera EastEnders played by Michelle Joseph from 1 March 1994 until 16 May 1995. Della is the first lesbian character to be featured on the show.

== Character creation and development ==
Della and Binnie were the first lesbian couple to be featured in EastEnders. Their inclusion was an attempt to portray positive examples of homosexual characters. Their lesbian kiss accounted for some 45 percent of viewer complaints to the BBC regarding EastEnders in 1994, provoking more complaints than any other television programme that year (according to research published by the Broadcasting Standards Council in 1995). In 2005 their lesbian kiss was featured in E4's X Rated: Top 20 Most Controversial TV Moments, a documentary examining British TV's most talked about on-screen moments. It was placed at number 11 in the chart and, according to the poll, received an estimated 486 viewer complaints and 180 column inches in the British press. In 1995, bisexual actress Pam St. Clement, who plays Pat Evans, was asked if the lesbian storyline suffered from "seeming to follow the pack rather than lead it". She commented, "I think they realised there was something missing, but having given themselves that brief they didn't know what the fuck to do with it. I think Michael Cashman made Colin Russell so successful because he is a gay man. I'd never argue for somebody having to be a part to do it - you don't have to be a murderer to play Othello - and I think the two young girls [who played Della and Binnie] did what they could, but they couldn't really give the programme any help."

== Storylines ==
Della arrives in Walford in March 1994 as a new assistant to the market trader, Sanjay Kapoor (Deepak Verma). Della is a former hairdresser who had gone to the same school as the barman Steve Elliot (Mark Monero). Realising that Della has a talent that could be a potential money spinner, Steve decides to go into business with her. He and Della make plans to open a hairdressing salon in George Street. The salon, Kool for Kutz, opens in April that year.

After some problems at home, Della comes to live with Steve at The Queen Victoria public house, and Steve soon begins seeing her as more than just his business partner. He actively pursues her, which she seems to encourage. However, Della is only leading Steve on in order to mask the fact that she is a lesbian, and days later he catches her in bed with her girlfriend Binnie (Sophie Langham). As a result, Steve throws Della out, which prompts a feud between him and Binnie. Della is mortified that her sexuality has been uncovered and her shame is often a major source of conflict for her girlfriend, who is openly gay. Steve is eventually forced to come to terms with Della's homosexuality although he harbours feelings for her for a long time after. He makes several attempts to convert her into a heterosexual. Binnie and Della soon move into a bedsit on the Square. Problems arise when Natalie Price (Lucy Speed) hears a rumour that they are lesbians and begins spreading hateful rumours about them. This reaction only increases Della's trepidation about living as a lesbian and she starts denying the rumours, claiming that she'd never slept with a woman before in her life. Infuriated by Della's shame, Binnie threatens to leave the Square, which forces Della to prioritise. In order to convince Binnie to stay, Della kisses her in the middle of Bridge Street, which really gives the gossips something to talk about.

Binnie spends most of her time on the Square trying to force Della to accept herself as a lesbian. She regularly pressures her to "come out" to her mother, which often causes fights between them. In January 1995 they go through a bad patch in their relationship, and Della turns to her old friend Steve for support. They arrange an evening out, which again leads Steve to think that she has changed her mind about dating him. After a flirtatious night and plenty of cocktails, Steve tries to convince Della that she isn't really gay and goes to kiss her. Furious, Della storms off and once again leaves Steve looking the fool. Back in Walford, an insanely jealous Binnie jumps to all the wrong conclusions and berates Della for sleeping with Steve. After witnessing them argue, Steve decides to cut his losses and pull out of his partnership at the salon. He signs the lease over to a grateful Della, and promises to never make a pass at her again. Binnie eventually accepts their explanation and she and Della reconcile.

Later in the year, Della begins to grow disillusioned with life in Walford, and she and Binnie decide to make a new start in Ibiza. After tying up loose ends, including selling the lease of her salon and firing her obnoxious assistant Lydia (Marlaine Gordon), Della decides that the time had come to tell her mother, Alica, about her sexual orientation. However, after continuous stalling, Alice eventually shows up in Walford and is accidentally informed by Peggy Mitchell (Barbara Windsor) instead. Unaware of this, Della continues to lie to her mother about her relationship with Binnie, but on her final day she finally works up the courage and telephones her mother with the news. Alice relays that she already knows, and is happy that she has finally told her the truth. Della then leaves with her conscience clear. Her last appearance is in May 1995.

== See also ==
- List of LGBT characters in television
