= Laura Gómez (actress) =

American actress

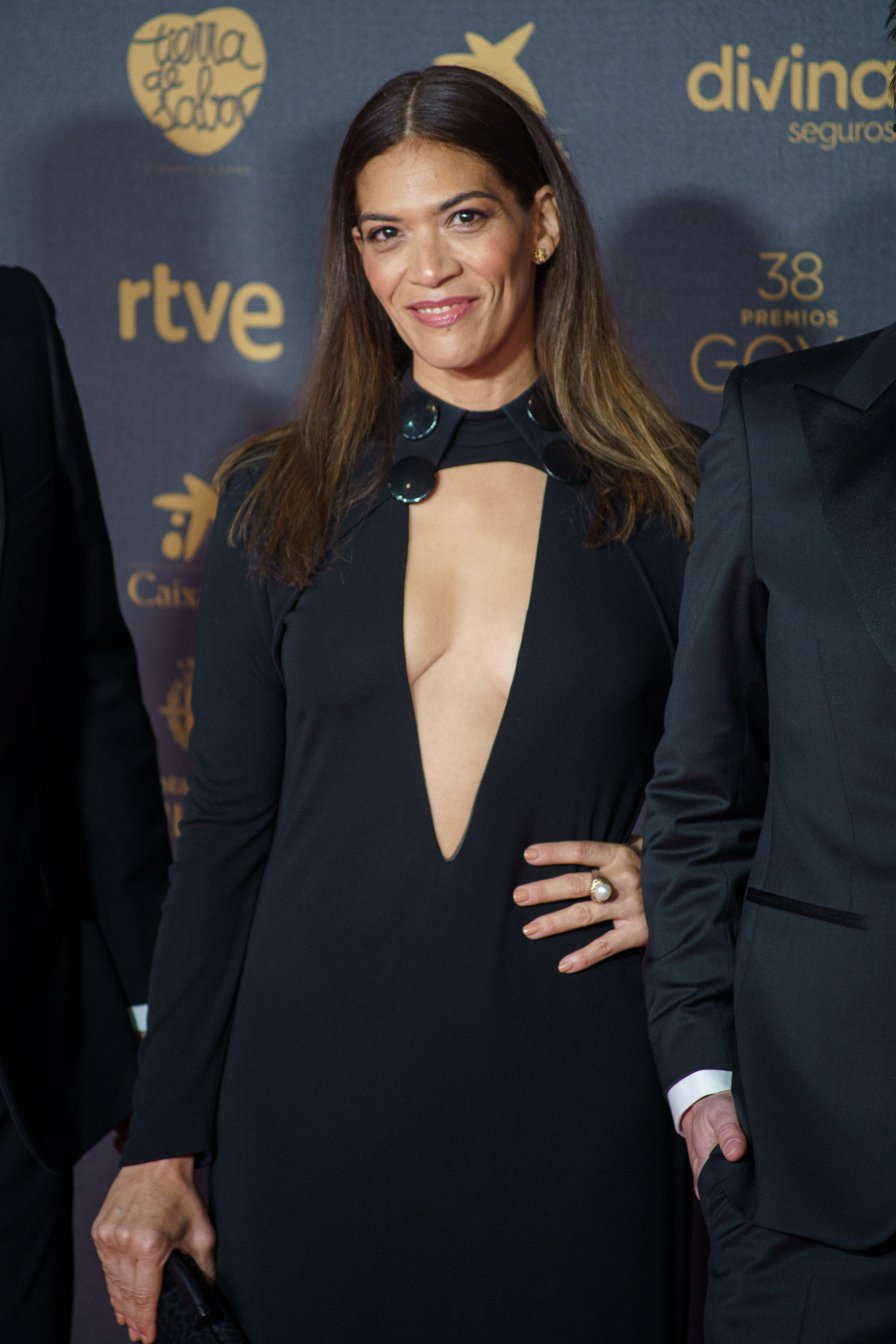
- Gómez attending the 38th Goya Awards
- Born: New Jersey, U.S.
- Occupation: Actress
- Years active: 1998–present

Laura Gómez is an American actress. Gómez is known for her role as Blanca Flores in the Netflix comedy-drama series, Orange Is the New Black (2013–2019).

== Early years ==
Born in New Jersey, United States, Gómez grew up in Santo Domingo working as an actress and reporter. She moved to New York at the age of 21 to study acting and filmmaking at the New York University. After three years in the United States, she made her entry into theater and voice work.

== Career ==
Gómez began her career appearing in Dominican film Víctimas del poder (1998) and later worked on Mexican telenovela Por tu amor. She made her American television debut appearing in an episode of Law & Order in 2008. In 2011, Gómez was awarded an IX Screenwriting Developing Grant by the Spanish Fundación Carolina. She wrote, directed and produced the short films To Kill A Roach—for which she received the NYU Fall 2012 Technisphere Award for Outstanding Achievement—and Hallelujah. She is a member of Spanish Repertory Theater, with which she has appeared in critically acclaimed theatrical productions such as Doña Flor y sus dos maridos and La casa de los espíritus. Her voice-over work includes Spanish-language announcer for CoverGirl and Suave, and audiobooks including How the García Girls Lost Their Accent, by Julia Álvarez, and The Brief Wondrous Life of Oscar Wao by Junot Díaz. She directed and co-produced The Iron Warehouse (2015), written by the playwright Hilary Bettis.

In 2013, Gómez was cast as Blanca Flores in the Netflix comedy-drama series, Orange Is the New Black. She was a recurring character during the first five seasons and was promoted to regular for season 6 and 7. As a part of the cast, Gómez received Screen Actors Guild Award for Outstanding Performance by an Ensemble in a Comedy Series in 2016. From 2014 to 2015 she also had a recurring role in the NBC series Law & Order: Special Victims Unit, and in 2015 appeared in the HBO miniseries Show Me a Hero. In 2016, she starred in the Dominican sports drama film Sambá receiving La Silla Award nomination for Best Supporting Actress. Also in 2016, Gómez co-starred in the American thriller film, Exposed.

In 2020, Gómez appeared in the Dutch drama series, Anne+. In 2022 she starred in the Spanish drama film Upon Entry. The film received positive reviews from critics. In 2024 she appeared in the drama film La cocina, it had its world premiere at the 74th Berlin International Film Festival.

== Filmography ==
=== Film ===
Year	Title	Role	Notes
1998	Víctimas del poder		
2000	Provocación		
2008	Pinchos y Rolos	Elizabeth	Short film
2008	Crimen	Dedé Mirabal	
2009	Cleaning Law	Laura	Short film
2009	Nueva York	Puerto Rican Mom	Short film
2012	To Kill a Roach	Alicia	Short film, also writer and director
2012	Cheesecake and Tango	Diana	Short film
2013	Truth Will Out	Mamacita	Short film
2014	Yo, la peor de todas	Paula	Short film
2014	Hallelujah	Natalia	Short film, also writer and director
2015	Trabajo	Lilí	Short film
2015	Uniform	Nadine	Short film
2016	Exposed	Eva De La Cruz	
2016	America Adrift	Wilma	
2017	Sambá	Luna Torres	Nominated — La Silla Award for Best Supporting Actress
2017	Maggie Black	Kim	
2022	Upon Entry	Agent Vásquez	
2024	Safari		
2024	La Cocina	Laura	

=== Television ===
Year	Title	Role	Notes
2008	Law & Order	Claudia	Episode: "Challenged"
2013-2019	Orange Is the New Black	Blanca Flores	Recurring character (seasons 1-5) Series Regular (seasons 6-7); Screen Actors Guild Award for Outstanding Performance by an Ensemble in a Comedy Series (2016); Nominated — Screen Actors Guild Award for Outstanding Performance by an Ensemble in a Comedy Series (2017)
2014–15	Law & Order: Special Victims Unit	Selena Cruz	3 episodes
2015	Show Me a Hero	Dama Montero	4 episodes
2020	Anne+	Cecilia	3 episodes
2020	The Last O.G.	Valerie	Episode: "Come Clean"
