= Hanna van Vliet =

Dutch actress (born 1992)

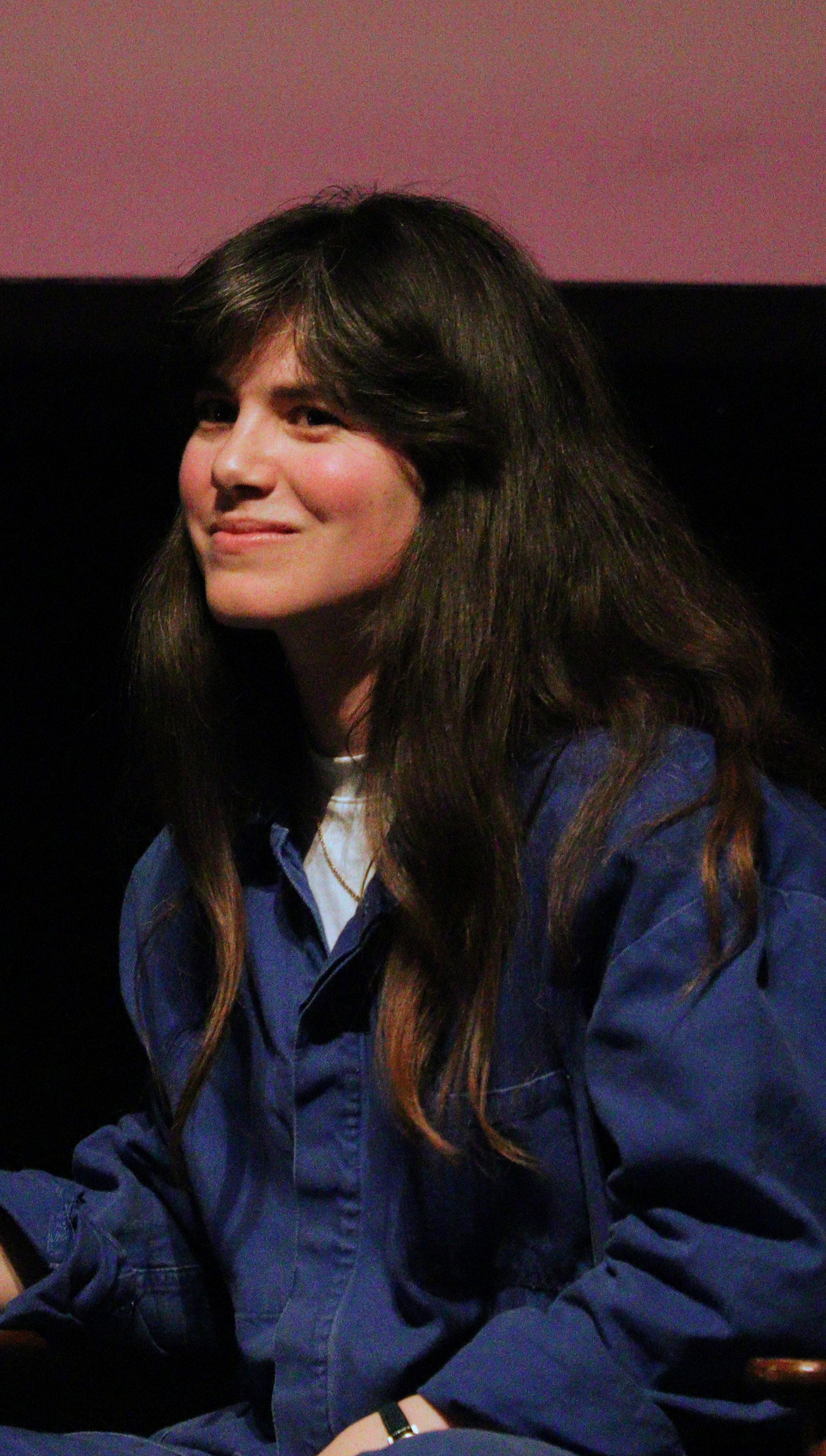
- Hanna van Vliet in 2025
- Born: 6 June 1992 (age 33); Gorinchem, Netherlands
- Education: Amsterdamse Theater & Kleinkunstacademie
- Occupation: Actress
- Years active: 2009 - present
- Known for: Anne+

Hanna van Vliet (born 6 June 1992) is a Dutch actress. She received international acclaim for her role as Anne Verbeek in the Anne+ productions. In 2022, she received the Shooting Stars Award at the Berlinale as one of the ten most promising European film actors.

== Biography ==
Van Vliet started acting at the age of six and played her entire youth at Het Jeugdtheaterhuis Gouda. In 2014, she graduated from the Amsterdam Theater & Kleinkunstacademie. That same year she played the lead role in a Pippi Longstocking musical and in 2015, she played the lead role in a musical based on the book The Twins, for which she received a Musical Award nomination for best female lead in a major musical. In 2018, she was nominated again for a Musical Award for Best Supporting Actor for her role in Fiddler on the Roof. In 2017, she appeared on the silver screen with the role of Winnie in the film Ron Goossens, Low Budget Stuntman.

From the beginning of 2017, Van Vliet was closely involved in the development of the Anne+ series, in which she plays the title role. The series premiered at the Netherlands Film Festival at the end of 2018 and had a second season which started on Tuesday, March 3, 2020, and from March 2021 is featured on streaming platform Netflix. Anne+ received a sequel in 2021 in the form of a feature film with a cinema release in the Netherlands and Belgium, and afterwards a release worldwide on Netflix. In 2020, Van Vliet was nominated for a Golden Calf for Best Actress in Television Drama at the Netherlands Film Festival for her role as Anne in the series. Since September 2020, Van Vliet has played the role of Gwen Winter in the television series SpangaS. In 2022, she won the Shooting Stars Award at the Berlinale as one of the 10 most promising European young talents.

== Filmography ==
=== Film ===
Year	Film	Role	Type
2009	Zij van Katwijk	Hanna	Short film
2010	Zomerstorm	Sarah	Short film
2011	Code Blue	Cashier	Feature film
2012	Sign of Life	Girl	Silent, short film
2015	Brocante	Michelle	Short film
2017	Ron Goossens, Low Budget Stuntman	Winnie	Feature film
2017	Broers	Jet	Feature film
2017	Oh Baby	Lucy	Feature film
2019	Het Juk	Ciska	Short film
2020	Hideous Henk	Michellefer	Short animation film
2021	Quicksand	Suze	Feature film
2021	Anne+	Anne Verbeek	Feature film
2021	Lost Transport	Simone	Feature film

=== Television ===
Year	Programme	Episode	Role
2010	Retour Uruzgan		
2015	Moordvrouw	Beschermengel	
2015	Danni Lowinski		
2017	B.A.B.S.	Loek en Marian	Keet
2017	Toon	7 episodes	Becky
2018	Jeuk	Zalig Pasen	Hanna
2018-2020	Anne+	all 14 episodes	Anne Verbeek
2019	Random Shit	Det første vil være lastene (episode 2)	Beauty
2020-2021	Nieuw Zeer		Various roles
2020	SpangaS	Season 14	Gwen Winter
2022	De gevaarlijkste wegen van de wereld	Season 6, episode 8	Herself
2022	Modern Love Amsterdam	De Geest Uit De Fles	Naomi
2023	A Small Light		Frieda Belinfante

=== Theatre ===
Van Vliet played in the following theatre plays:

Year	Play	Theatre group
2014	Op de bodem	Orkater
2014	Wreed en teder	De Toneelschuur
2014	Pippi Langkous	Senf Theaterpartners
2015	Momo	Theatergroep Kwatta
2015	SCHWARSPULVER -	Writer Esther Duysker and director Sanya Schreude
2015-2016	De Tweeling	Stage Entertainment
2017	Fiddler on the Roof (De Musical Anatevka)	Stage Entertainment
2018	De Meeuw	Amsterdamse Bostheater
2019	Sweet Sixteen	De Toneelmakerij
2020	Dangerous Liaisons	Bos Theaterproducties
