= Anne+ =

Television series

- Genre: Drama/Romance
- Created by: Valerie Bisscheroux; Maud Wiemeijer
- Written by: Maud Wiemeijer
- Directed by: Valerie Bisscheroux
- Starring: Hanna van Vliet
- Theme music composer: Tess van der Velde
- Opening theme: Figure Out
- Country of origin: Netherlands
- Original language: Dutch
- No. of seasons: 2

Production
- Producer: Rachel van Bommel Suzan de Swaan Laura Bouwmeester
- Production location: Amsterdam
- Editor: Augustine Huijsser
- Camera setup: Cor Booy
- Production companies: Millstreet Films; 3Lab

Related
- Anne+ (film)

Anne+ is a 2018 Dutch drama television series that premiered on BNNVARA and 3LAB on 30 September 2018. Set in Amsterdam, it follows the love life of Anne, a twenty four year-old lesbian woman. The series is created by Maud Wiemeijer, Valerie Bisscheroux, and Hanna van Vliet, and produced by Millstreet Films.

== Plot ==
In season 1, as Anne "moves into her own place she unexpectedly runs into her ex-girlfriend Lily. Lily was her first girlfriend and a lot has happened since they broke up four years ago. Over the weekend, Anne reflects on the relationships she has had throughout her student years in Amsterdam. In six episodes we learn about Anne’s turbulent love life and how these diverse girls and various relationships have contributed to who she is today".

In season 2, "Anne seems to have things going for her; she has a job at a creative agency, plenty of close friends, she is dating a lovely girl and lives in a great apartment in the city center of Amsterdam. But still she is restless. She wants a career change, but doesn’t know where to start and constantly keeps being distracted. Especially when all of a sudden an ex-girlfriend is standing on her doorstep, while she is already having trouble with a different ex. Her parents apparently have their own stuff to deal with, so she can’t count on them to help her out. And her friends seem to have other things on their mind than what is going on with Anne. Also, she should really start doing something about those bills pilling up on her kitchen table. This grown up life turns out to be something other than she expected. How are you supposed to balance friends, work and relationships?"

== Cast and characters ==
=== Main ===
- Hanna van Vliet as Anne
- Eline van Gils as Lily

=== Recurring ===
- Jade Olieberg as Jip
- Amy Van Der Weerden as Daantje
- Flip Zonne Zuijderland as Doris
- Alex Hendrickx as Casper
- Huib Cluistra as Teun
- Jouman Fattal as Sara
- Jacqueline Blom as Liesbeth
- Hein van der Heijden as Jos
- Jesse Mensah as Max
- Valentijn Benard as Oscar
- Myrthe Huber as Caro
- Ayla Satijn as Maya
- Laura Gómez as Cecilia

=== Guest ===
- Gale Rama as Liv
- Niels Gooijer as Mark
- Sharai Rodrigues as Janna
- Djamila Landbrug as Sofie
- Dorian Bindels as Daniël
- Kirsten Mulder as Esther
- Sarah Janneh as Lotte
- Joy Wielkens as Noa
- Ernesto Dennis as Gastheer
- Marloes Ijpelaar as Maaike
- Jetty Mathurin as Barbara
- Rick Paul van Mulligen as Ralph
- Lieke-Rosa Altink as Makelaar
- Juda Goslinga as Henk
- Urmie Plein as Naomi
- Ayrton Fraenk as Milan
- Olivier van Klaarbergen as Yoeri
- Anne Chris Schulting as Stella

== Background and production ==
The story was conceived by Maud Wiemeijer in 2015, who worked on it with director Valerie Bisscheroux. The two also worked on it with actor Hanna van Vliet. The series was initially funded using crowdfunding. Season 1 consists of 6 episodes, each one approximately 12 minutes. Season 2 includes 8 episodes, each approximately 24 minutes long.

British television network Channel 4 bought the rights of Anne+ from Millstreet Films on 29 January 2020, for streaming on Walter Presents, in the UK and was made available on the platform in June 2020.

== Release ==
Anne+ was introduced at the Netherlands Film Festival, before premiering on 3LAB, the online platform of NPO 3, and on BNNVARA. The first season was released on 30 September 2018. The second season was released on 3 March 2020.

It had its North American premiere at the 2019 Tribeca Film Festival. The series was planned to be released on YouTube in 2018; however, it was postponed and the first season became available in January 2020.

== Film ==
In March 2021, the first two seasons appeared on Netflix in the Benelux. It was also announced that a movie will be released later this year. The film became available internationally on Netflix after its theatrical release. The film features actor Thorn Roos de Vries as the first non-binary character in a Dutch movie.
