= Heartless (TV series) =

- Poster for television series
- Genre: Supernatural; Dark fantasy
- Created by: Nikolaj Scherfig; Morten Dragsted
- Directed by: Natasha Arthy; Kaspar Munk
- Starring: Julie Zangenberg; Sebastian Jessen; Nicolaj Kopernikus; Allan Hyde; Gustav Giese; Julie Christiansen; Thomas Ernst; Laura Christensen
- Theme music composer: George Kallis
- Country of origin: Denmark
- Original language: Danish
- No. of seasons: 2
- No. of episodes: 8

Production
- Producers: Ronnie Fridthjof; Mille Bjørke; Bo Mortensen
- Running time: 42 minutes
- Production company: Frithiof Film

Original release
- Network: Kanal 5
- Release: 28 April 2014 – 22 November 2015

Heartless is a Danish supernatural drama television series that premiered on Kanal 5 on 28 April 2014 and ran for two seasons. The story centers around twins Sebastian and Sofie, played by Sebastian Jessen and Julie Zangenberg, who enroll as students of Ottsmansgaard boarding school hoping to discover the secret about their supernatural curse.

The series was released on Netflix in the United States and Canada on 1 April 2016. It premiered in the United Kingdom on Channel 4 on 30 October 2017, and thereafter moved to its foreign-language VOD service Walter Presents.

== Plot summary ==
Raised in an orphanage, siblings Sophie and Sebastian carry a dark, fatal secret: in order to survive they have to feed from the life energy of other people. If they do not stop in time their prey ignites and turns to ashes. Sofie and Sebastian try to find answers to what they are, which leads them to Ottmannsgaard, a gloomy and traditional boarding school. The siblings must contend with strong emotions as they experience their first serious feelings of love and passion, while resisting the urge to drain the energy of the other students and those they care about.

== Cast ==
=== Main ===
- Julie Zangenberg as Sofie. Twin sister of Sebastian.
- Sebastian Jessen as Sebastian. Twin brother of Sofie.
- Nicolaj Kopernikus as Rector Just. Emilie's father and Ottmannsgaard headmaster.
- Allan Hyde as Pieter.
- Gustav Giese as Ditlev. Alpha male of the school.
- Julie Christiansen as Emilie. Sofie's love interest.
- Thomas Ernst as Frederik.
- Laura Christensen as Countess Gertrud Ottmann.

=== Recurring ===
Katrine Greis-Rosenthal as Ida Just, Emilie's sister.

== Episodes ==
=== Series overview ===
Series	Episodes	Originally released	
Series	Episodes	First released	Last released
1	5	28 April 2014	26 May 2014
2	3	22 November 2015	

=== Season 1 (2014) ===
No. overall	No. in season	Title	Directed by	Written by	Original release date	Denmark viewers (millions)
1	1	"Episode 1"	Natasha Arthy	Unknown	28 April 2014	N/A
Twin siblings Sebastian and Sofie enroll in Ottmansgaard boarding school, hoping to discover the secret of their supernatural curse.
2	2	"Episode 2"	Natasha Arthy	Unknown	5 May 2014	N/A
The twins discover why their mother attended Ottsmansgaard. Sofie's roommate falls for Sebastian. Ditlev and the prefects prepare to the haze the new students.
3	3	"Episode 3"	Natasha Arthy	Unknown	12 May 2014	N/A
Sofie and Emilie's friendship deepens. The twins discover that their secret dates back many years. Ditlev's obsession with Sofie remains a problem.
4	4	"Episode 4"	Natasha Arthy	Unknown	19 May 2014	N/A
Emilie's father investigates a shocking death close to the school. The twins try to keep their secret from Nadja. Sebastian falls for a servant.
5	5	"Episode 5"	Natasha Arthy	Unknown	26 May 2014	N/A
The twins must take drastic action to prevent Nadja from learning their secret. Sebastian has to deal with Josefine's violent ex-boyfriend.

=== Season 2 (2015) ===
No. overall	No. in season	Title	Directed by	Written by	Original release date	Denmark viewers (millions)
6	1	"Episode 6"	Kaspar Munk	Unknown	22 November 2015	N/A
Headmaster Just hunts the black-eyes at the school while his daughter Emilie learns Sofie's secret. The twins discover a graveyard in the forest.
7	2	"Episode 7"	Kaspar Munk	Unknown	22 November 2015	N/A
The twins team-up with a stranger to hunt the gold heart, with fatal consequences. Just reveals how far he's willing to go to fight the black-eyes.
8	3	"Episode 8"	Kaspar Munk	Unknown	22 November 2015	N/A
The truth comes out about Sofie and Sebastian's curse and the death of Emilie's mother, forcing her to decide between the twins and her own family.
