= Sophie Langham =

English actress

- Born: 1976 (age 49–50); Isle of Wight, England
- Education: Rose Bruford College
- Occupation: Actress
- Notable work: Binnie Roberts in EastEnders (1994-95)

Sophie Louise Langham (born 1976) is an English actress.

She is most famous for playing one half of Walford's first lesbian couple, in the popular BBC soap opera, EastEnders. Her character, Binnie Roberts, made her first appearance in 1994 and left in 1995. During her time on the show Langham's character and her on-screen girlfriend Della Alexander (Michelle Joseph) made headlines in the British press when EastEnders screened its first lesbian kiss. EastEnders added to the controversy by making Della and Binnie a mixed-race couple.

Coincidentally, Sophie Langham and Michelle Joseph both attended Rose Bruford College within a year of each other.

Since leaving EastEnders Langham has appeared in episodes of Jonathan Creek (1998), The Bill (1997; 2001), Holby City (2003) and Doctors (2004).
