= Mark Monero =

British actor and musician

- Born: Mark Marcel Monero; Newham, London, England
- Occupations: Actor, musician
- Years active: 1980–present

Mark Marcel Monero is a British actor and musician. He is best known for his role as Steve Elliot in the BBC soap opera EastEnders (1991–96), but he has appeared in many other television and theatre roles, and had parts in a number of films, including Prayer for the Dying and Sid and Nancy.

== Early life and education ==
Born in Newham, London, England, to Afro-Caribbean parents, Monero began acting when introduced to Anna Scher's theatre school in Islington in the late 1970s.

== Career ==
One of Monero's earliest roles was in the 1980s film Babylon, in which he plays the brother of Brinsley Ford's character "Blue". Monero started with some early roles in TV serials such as Play for Today (1980), Bless Me Father (1981) and a role in the BBC children's programme Grange Hill (1983). He went on to secure the role of Woody in the popular detective series Lovejoy (1986), had a role in Dempsey and Makepeace (1986), and a part in the film Sid and Nancy. During this period Monero also appeared as part of the comedy duo Shift and Zed with Gary Beadle, in Smiley Cultures Club Mix programme.

In 1991 he became the character of Steve Elliot in EastEnders, starring alongside Michelle Gayle, who played his love-interest Hattie Tavernier, until 1996.

Monero's other credits include The Lenny Henry Show (1988), Young, Gifted and Broke (1989), The Bill (1985; 1988; 2001; 2009).

He starred in the BBC comedy Gimme Gimme Gimme (2001), Casualty (2002), Judge John Deed (2005), Waking The Dead (2005), and Doctors (2006). He also played the rapping father of musician, Jal, in E4's teen drama Skins (2007), had a role in the BBC Asian Network soap opera Silver Street, and appeared in Doctor Who. He played role of Caesar in the Indian dance film Mad About Dance .

Monero appeared in The Chemical Brothers album Further visuals, in the song "Escape Velocity". He also appeared in the visuals for the live versions of their songs "Hey Boy Hey Girl" and "Do It Again".

Monero has also acted in numerous plays.

He composed and played music as part of the band North of Ping Pong between 2006 and 2012.
