= Michelle Joseph =

British actress

- Born: May 1970 (age 56)
- Education: Rose Bruford College
- Occupation: Actress
- Known for: Della Alexander in EastEnders

Michelle Joseph (born May 1970) is a British actress.

== Acting career ==
Joseph is most famous for playing Walford's first lesbian resident, Della Alexander, in the BBC soap opera EastEnders from 1994 to 1995.

Other acting credits include:

- As Time Goes By (1994)
- EastEnders (1994–1995)
- Thief takers (1996–1997)
- Dream Team (1998)
- The Bill (2000; 2001)
- So What Now? (2001)
- A Touch of Frost (2002)
- Holby City (2002)
- Space Odyssey: Voyage To The Planets (2004)
- Messiah (2006)
- Perfect Parents (2006)
- Doctors (2007)
- Apparitions (2008)
- Doctors (2012)
- Fast Girls (2012)
