= List of comedy television series with LGBTQ characters =

This is a list of comedy television series (including web television and miniseries) which feature lesbian, gay, bisexual, and transgender characters. Non-binary, pansexual, asexual, and graysexual characters are also included. The orientation can be portrayed on-screen, described in the dialogue or mentioned.

== 1930s ==
Show	Character	Actor	Notes	Network Series run
Byng Ho! Queue For Song	Bawdy but British	Douglas Byng	Douglas Byng was the first female impersonator on UK television. His songs are full of sexual innuendo and double entendres. Byng-Ho! was a comedy sketch show with two episodes. Queue For Song was a variety show featuring comedy and music, with various performers. Byng was openly gay within his own theatrical world, but very discreet outside it. He also starred in music halls, burlesque revues and cabaret.	BBC One; 1938–1939

== 1950s ==
Show	Character	Actor	Notes	Network Series run
The Ernie Kovacs Show	Percy Dovetonsils	Ernie Kovacs	Percy Dovetonsils was a wealthy, giddy and lisping effeminate poet. TV reviewers called him a sissy. Percy came closest to saying he was gay in a skit where he began plucking petals from a plastic flower saying, "he loves me, he loves me not..." John Barbour, who produced and narrated a documentary about Kovacs, said the Percy character was "the Alfred E. Neuman of the gay set".	CBS; 1952–1954
The Ernie Kovacs Show	Rock Mississippi	Ernie Kovacs	In a January 26, 1956, episode, Kovacs basically outed secretly-closeted Rock Hudson, when he played the character Rock Mississippi. Rock was a Hollywood film star who wore long false eyelashes and was swishy and effeminate. Rock was offering a preview of his latest movie, The Umbrella Salesman of Ranchipur.	NBC; 1956
It's A Great Life	Mrs. Shufflewick	Rex Jameson	Rex Jameson was a female impersonator who created the character Mrs. Shufflewick at a BBC audition. Mrs. Shufflewick was a ruddy, tipsy cockney woman settled in the snug of her local pub, The Cock & Comfort: "a lot of comfort, but not much of anything else". In 1955, he was featured in the TV show It's A Great Life and was voted "TV Personality of the Year" for his performance. He also appeared on TV in other shows from the 1950s-1970s. Jameson was secretly gay, until he was outed in the 1970s.	BBC; 1955
The Steve Allen Show	Travel Correspondent	Tom Poston	Poston portrayed a TV news travel correspondent doing a report from Scotland, while wearing a kilt. When anchorman Allen asks him about his knees getting cold, Poston replies, no, but they do get a lot of compliments, I haven't paid for a drink since I got here. Poston also relays to Allen that a Duke proposed to him and they were engaged, while primping effeminately.	NBC; 1959

== 1970s ==
Show	Character	Actor	Notes	Network Series run
Agony	Michael	Peter Denyer	First British sitcom to feature a gay couple in a non-camp fashion. Michael eventually committed suicide after being outed on a live phone-in radio show.	ITV; 1979-1981
Agony	Rob	Jeremy Bulloch	First British sitcom to feature a gay couple in a non-camp fashion. Michael eventually committed suicide after being outed on a live phone-in radio show.	ITV; 1979-1981
Alice	Jack Newhouse	Denny Miller	Alice falls for Mel's friend Jack, a gay ex-professional football player. When he comes out to her, Alice is concerned about letting her son go fishing with him.	CBS; 1976-1985
All in the Family	Steve	Philip Carey	Archie's friend Steve, an ex–professional football player, shocks him by telling him he's gay.	CBS; 1971-1979
All in the Family	Veronica	K Callan	Veronica was the longtime partner of Edith's cousin Liz.	CBS; 1971-1979
All That Glitters	Linda Murkland	Linda Gray	Linda Murkland is a transgender woman. The show featured the first regular transgender character on TV.	Syndication; 1977
Are You Being Served?	Mr. Humphries	John Inman	Humphries is the junior menswear assistant working in the fictional Grace Brothers department store.	BBC1; 1972-1985
Ball Four	Bill Westlake	David James Carroll	Based on the book Ball Four. Featured a gay rookie baseball player.	CBS; 1976
Barney Miller	Marty Morrison	Jack DeLeon	Darryl and Marty are openly gay recurring characters, and partners. Series creator Danny Arnold worked with the National Gay Task Force in developing the characters of Darryl and Marty. Initially, both were presented as flamboyantly gay, but as the series progressed Darryl began acting and dressing more conservatively.	ABC; 1975-1982
Barney Miller	Darryl Driscoll	Ray Stewart	Darryl and Marty are openly gay recurring characters, and partners. Series creator Danny Arnold worked with the National Gay Task Force in developing the characters of Darryl and Marty. Initially, both were presented as flamboyantly gay, but as the series progressed Darryl began acting and dressing more conservatively.	ABC; 1975-1982
Barney Miller	Officer Zitelli	Dino Natali	Zitelli comes out to Miller, after someone writes an anonymous letter threatening to reveal that one of the cops is gay.	ABC; 1975-1982
The Bob Newhart Show	Craig Plager	Howard Hesseman	Craig joins Bob's group therapy and comes out to the group, with mixed reactions from them.	CBS; 1972-1978
The Corner Bar	Peter Panama	Vincent Schiavelli	The first continuing portrayal of a gay person on American television.	ABC; 1972–1973
Hot l Baltimore	George; Gordon	Lee Bergere; Henry Calvert	Middle aged couple living together. One of the first gay couples to be depicted on an American television series.	ABC; 1975
Hollywood Squares	Paul Lynde	Paul Lynde	Regular member of celebrities on Hollywood Squares.	ABC; 1975
Mary Hartman, Mary Hartman	Ed McCullough	Laurence Haddon	Ed and Howard were introduced as a pair of brothers sharing a house in the Hartmans' neighborhood but were later revealed to be a gay couple hoping to live an open life in Fernwood.	Syndicated; 1976–1977
Mary Hartman, Mary Hartman	Howard McCullough	Beeson Carroll	Ed and Howard were introduced as a pair of brothers sharing a house in the Hartmans' neighborhood but were later revealed to be a gay couple hoping to live an open life in Fernwood.	Syndicated; 1976–1977
The Mary Tyler Moore Show	Ben Sutherland	Robert Moore	Ben is gay and the brother of Phyllis. In "My Brother's Keeper", she tries to set him up with Mary, but he instead hangs out with Rhoda who later tells Phyllis the reason why she's not interested in dating Ben.	CBS; 1970–1977
Maude	Barry Witherspoon	Robert Mandan	Walter is upset to hear that Maude's new friend, Barry Witherspoon, a local gay novelist, will be stopping by for drinks, feeling that he is a "pompous windbag."	CBS; 1972-1978
Maude	1st man	Craig Richard Nelson	Maude's neighbor Arthur (Conrad Bain), is outraged about a new gay bar in town, so she takes him there to change Arthur's bigoted mind through thoughtful conversation with a young patron (1st man).	CBS; 1972-1978
The Nancy Walker Show	Terry Folson	Ken Olfson	Terry is an out-of-work actor and personal assistant to lead character Nancy Kitteridge (Nancy Walker).	ABC; 1976
Porridge	Lukewarm	Christopher Biggins	Lukewarm is an openly gay inmate, he got his nickname from working in the prison kitchen and always preparing tepid food. Porridge is considered to be one of the greatest British sitcoms of all time.	BBC; 1974-1977
Porridge	Gay Gordon	Felix Bowness	Gay Gordon is a semi-regular character and worked in the kitchens. One of the episodes he appeared in was "Just Desserts".	BBC; 1974-1977
Soap	Jodie Dallas	Billy Crystal	Jodie is openly gay, and dated a closeted football player, but later dates a woman. Jodie Dallas is one of the most memorable gay characters from the 70s and played a central role in the series week after week.	ABC; 1977–1981
Snip	Michael Robert St. James	Walter Wanderman	Michael is an openly gay hairdresser. The show was created by James Komack, the creator of Chico and the Man and Welcome Back Kotter. The series was to premiere September 30, 1976, on NBC, but was shelved at the last minute and was never broadcast in the United States. The five completed episodes aired in Australia.	NBC; 1976

== 1980s ==
Show	Character	Actor	Notes	Network Series run
After Henry	Russell Bryant	Jonathan Newth	Russell operated a second-hand bookstore and was a good friend of Sarah France (Prunella Scales), who worked for him.	ITV; 1988-1992
'Allo 'Allo!	Lt. Hubert Gruber	Guy Siner	Lt. Gruber was seemingly gay, and interested in the series' lead character, Rene Artois (Gorden Kaye). In the series finale's flash-forward scene, however, it was revealed that Gruber eventually married Pvt. Helga Geerhart (Kim Hartman).	BBC; 1982–1992
Anything but Love	Jules Kramer	Richard Frank	Jules is Norman's (Louis Giambalvo) fawning assistant.	ABC; 1989-1992
Brass	Morris Hardacre	James Saxon	Morris is a gay college student with a fondness for teddy bears. Morris' character was based on Lord Sebastian Flyte from Brideshead Revisited.	ITV; 1982-1984
Brothers	Cliff Waters	Paul Regina	On the day of his wedding, Cliff comes out as gay, which does not sit well with his two older brothers, Joe (Robert Walden), an ex-professional football player, and Lou (Brandon Maggart), a conservative working-class man.	Showtime; 1984–1989
Brothers	Donald Maltby	Philip Charles MacKenzie	Donald is Cliff's best friend, openly gay, and proud of it. When Cliff's brother Joe calls him a fairy, Donald quips "actually we prefer the term hobgoblin".	Showtime; 1984–1989
Check It Out!	Leslie Rappaport	Aaron Schwartz	Leslie is openly gay, and a cashier at the fictitious supermarket Cobb's. The show is based on the British series Tripper's Day.	CTV; USA; 1985-1988
CODCO	Duncan	Tommy Sexton	Duncan and Jerome are a flamboyant pair of gay lawyers, appearing in a recurring segment called "Queen's Counselors".	CBC TV; 1988–1993
CODCO	Jerome	Greg Malone	Duncan and Jerome are a flamboyant pair of gay lawyers, appearing in a recurring segment called "Queen's Counselors".	CBC TV; 1988–1993
Daily at Dawn	Leslie Windrush	Terry Bader	Leslie is the gay showbiz and social writer at the metropolitan newspaper, Daily at Dawn.	Seven Network; 1981
Designing Women	Kendall Dobbs	Tony Goldwyn	A young gay man diagnosed with HIV asks the Sugarbaker firm to design his funeral.	CBS; 1986–1993
Doctor Doctor	Richard Stratford	Tony Carreiro	Richard is the openly gay brother of lead character Mike Stratford (Matt Frewer).	CBS; 1989–1991
Dream Stuffing	Richard	Ray Burdis	British sitcom about two unemployed girls who share a London flat. Their neighbor Richard is gay.	Channel 4; 1984
Hail to the Chief	Randy	Joel Brooks	Randy is a gay secret service agent to the first female U.S. president.	ABC; 1985
Hooperman	Rick Silardi	Joseph Gian	Police Officer Rick Silardi is openly gay, but seems to spend most of his time fending off the affections of his straight female police partner, Officer Mo DeMott (Sydney Walsh), who wants to save him from being gay by making passes at him whenever possible.	ABC; 1987–1989
In Sickness and in Health	Winston Churchill	Eamonn Walker	Eamonn, a gay black man, is sent by social services to assist Alf (Archie Bunker in the U.S. version), which infuriates him.	BBC; 1985-1992
It Takes a Worried Man	Simon	Nicholas Le Prevost	Simon is Phillips (Peter Tilbury) gay analyst, who he sees on a regular basis. Peter Tilbury wrote most of the episodes for this series.	ITV; Channel 4; 1981-1983
The Kids in the Hall	Buddy Cole	Scott Thompson	Recurring sketch on the show; Buddy is an effeminate gay socialite, with a penchant for going on long comedic rants about his personal life and the gay community.	CBC TV; CBS; HBO; 1988-1995
The Kids in the Hall	Butch	Scott Thompson	Recurring sketch on the show called "Steps"; Three young stereotypical gay men sit on the steps of a café discussing current events, particularly those concerning the gay community. Riley is an effeminate airhead, Butch is an oversexed airhead who always talks about hot men, and Smitty is an intelligent fop who is usually exasperated by the other two.	CBC TV; CBS; HBO; 1988-1995
The Kids in the Hall	Riley	Dave Foley	Recurring sketch on the show called "Steps"; Three young stereotypical gay men sit on the steps of a café discussing current events, particularly those concerning the gay community. Riley is an effeminate airhead, Butch is an oversexed airhead who always talks about hot men, and Smitty is an intelligent fop who is usually exasperated by the other two.	CBC TV; CBS; HBO; 1988-1995
The Kids in the Hall	Smitty	Kevin McDonald	Recurring sketch on the show called "Steps"; Three young stereotypical gay men sit on the steps of a café discussing current events, particularly those concerning the gay community. Riley is an effeminate airhead, Butch is an oversexed airhead who always talks about hot men, and Smitty is an intelligent fop who is usually exasperated by the other two.	CBC TV; CBS; HBO; 1988-1995
The Kids in the Hall	Shona	Bruce McCulloch	Recurring sketch on the show; Shona is a loud-mouthed lesbian who appears in the "Humanoids for Humanism" sketches.	CBC TV; CBS; HBO; 1988-1995
Love, Sidney	Sidney Shore	Tony Randall	Sidney is a middle-aged, Jewish, New York homosexual. Although his sexuality is never explicitly mentioned, Tony Randall said that it was undeniable there in every episode, but it wasn't incidental to the plot. One of the conditions for Randall accepting the role was that he be given complete creative control.	NBC; 1981–1983
Roseanne	Beverly Harris	Estelle Parsons	Roseanne and Jackie's mom.	ABC; 1988–1997
Roseanne	Leon Carp	Martin Mull	Leon is Roseanne's boss at the diner, and marries his partner Scott.	ABC; 1988–1997
Roseanne	Scott	Fred Willard	Leon is Roseanne's boss at the diner, and marries his partner Scott.	ABC; 1988–1997
Roseanne	Nancy Bartlett	Sandra Bernhard	After Nancy's marriage to Arnie was over, she came out as a lesbian, and later, as bisexual.	ABC; 1988–1997
Sara	Dennis Kemper	Bronson Pinchot	Dennis is an openly gay attorney in the law firm at which the series is set.	NBC; 1985
Thirtysomething	Russell Weller	David Marshall Grant	Russell is a gay friend of Melissa's whom he met while she was photographing a wedding. Russell and Peter Montefiore have a one-night stand. The episode featuring the one night stand with Russell and Peter, titled "Strangers", was the subject of controversy	ABC; 1987–1991
Thirtysomething	Peter Montefiore	Peter Frechette	Russell is a gay friend of Melissa's whom he met while she was photographing a wedding. Russell and Peter Montefiore have a one-night stand. The episode featuring the one night stand with Russell and Peter, titled "Strangers", was the subject of controversy	ABC; 1987–1991
Women in Prison	Bonnie Harper	Antoinette Byron	Bonnie is a flirtatious openly lesbian in an all women's prison.	Fox; 1987–1988

== 1990s ==
Show	Character	Actor	Notes	Network Series run
After the Beep	Mae Santos	Genevieve Mooy	Mae is a lesbian, runs a bridal boutique, and is best friend of Josephine Donnelly (Genevieve Lemon). Every episode in the seven-part series starts with a message "after the beep" on Josephine's answering machine.	ABC TV; 1996
Agony Again	Michael Lucas	Sacha Grunpeter	Michael is a gay college student, who meets Will Brewer (Robert Whitson), the star of an Australian soap opera. Short-lived sequel to 1979 sitcom Agony.	BBC; 1995
Ally McBeal	Stephanie Grant	Wilson Cruz	Stephanie is a trans woman facing jail time for a solicitation charge, but after she's saved by Ally, she's beaten and murdered for being trans.	Fox; 1997-2002
Ally McBeal	Cindy McCauliff	Lisa Edelstein	Recurring character Cindy McCauliff is a trans woman challenging her employer's requirement that she undergo a physical examination. Unaware of her trans status, Mark starts dating her, but when she does tell him, he feels betrayed, calls her a man, and is sick to his stomach.	Fox; 1997-2002
Beggars and Choosers	Malcolm Laffley	Tuc Watkins	Laffley is a television casting director who came out to disprove sexual harassment charges leveled at him by a woman.	Showtime; 1999–2001
The Brian Benben Show	Billy Hernandez	Luis Antonio Ramos	Billy is gay, and the weatherman at the fictitious KYLA-TV news station.	CBS; 1998
The Brittas Empire	Gavin Featherly	Tim Marriott	Gavin and his partner Tim, were the first openly same-sex couple to ever appear in a British comedy on the BBC.	BBC; 1991–1997
The Brittas Empire	Tim Whistler	Russell Porter	Gavin and his partner Tim, were the first openly same-sex couple to ever appear in a British comedy on the BBC.	BBC; 1991–1997
The Crew	Paul Steadman	David Burke	Paul is a gay flight attendant that works for the fictitious Regency Airlines.	Fox; 1995–1996
Cutters	Troy King	Julius Carry	Troy was an Olympic gold medalist turned hairdresser.	CBS; 1993
Cybill	Waiter	Tim Maculan	The acerbic and riotous unnamed waiter at Cybill's favorite restaurant. In the episode titled "Whose Wife Am I, Anyway?", the waiter, who is nervous about telling his parents that he is gay, introduces Cybill as his fiancée.	CBS; 1995-1998
Daddy's Girls	Dennis Sinclair	Harvey Fierstein	Sinclair is a high-strung fashion designer. He was the first gay principal television character played by an openly gay actor.	CBS; 1994
Drop the Dead Donkey	Helen Cooper	Ingrid Lacey	Helen finally comes out to her mother, but discovers her secret was already well known.	Channel 4 1990–1998
Ellen	Ellen Morgan	Ellen DeGeneres	Ellen Morgan comes out to her therapist (Oprah Winfrey), and then announces it over an airport loudspeaker, and then comes out to her friends, in the episode titled "The Puppy Episode". Ellen begins dating Laurie (Lisa Darr) in the final season.	ABC; 1994–1998
Ellen	Susan	Laura Dern	Susan is a lesbian who helps Ellen come out of the closet in "The Puppy Episode"	ABC; 1994–1998
Ellen	Peter Barnes	Patrick Bristow	Peter and Barrett are Ellen's friends and an openly gay couple.	ABC; 1994–1998
Ellen	Barrett	Jack Plotnick	Peter and Barrett are Ellen's friends and an openly gay couple.	ABC; 1994–1998
Evening Shade	Ginger	Diahann Carroll	Ponder (Ossie Davis) is set up with Ginger who he learns is transgender.	CBS; 1990–1994
Fired Up	Ashley Mann	Mark Davis	Ashley is a drag queen, and Gwen's neighbor. Mark Davis, who portrays Ashley, is an openly gay comic.	NBC; 1997–1998
Friends	Carol Willick	Jane Sibbett	Carol is lesbian and Ross's ex-wife. Susan is lesbian and Carol's girlfriend. Carol and Susan married in season 2 episode "The One with the Lesbian Wedding". It was the first lesbian wedding portrayed on U.S. television.	NBC; 1994–2004
Friends	Susan Bunch	Jessica Hecht	Carol is lesbian and Ross's ex-wife. Susan is lesbian and Carol's girlfriend. Carol and Susan married in season 2 episode "The One with the Lesbian Wedding". It was the first lesbian wedding portrayed on U.S. television.	NBC; 1994–2004
Friends	Charles Bing / Helena Handbasket	Kathleen Turner	Charles is Chandler's transgender dad, who transitioned into a woman and renamed as Helena.	NBC; 1994–2004
Gimme Gimme Gimme	Tom Farrell	James Dreyfus	Tom is openly gay and a wannabe actor who has only had small roles on TV and on stage.	BBC2; BBC1; 1999-2001
Grace & Favour	Mr. Humphries	John Inman	A spin-off of Are You Being Served?. The employees of the fictional department store where they previously worked inherit an estate (Millstone Manor), that is the locale of the show.	BBC1; 1992-1993
Head over Heels	Ian	Patrick Bristow	Ian is a celibate bisexual who works at the fictional Head Over Heels video dating agency.	UPN; 1997
Hearts Afire	Diandra	Julie Cobb	Diandra is the ex-wife, now a lesbian, of John (John Ritter). Diandra and her lover Ruth had three guest appearances.	CBS; 1992-1995
Hearts Afire	Ruth	Conchata Ferrell	Diandra is the ex-wife, now a lesbian, of John (John Ritter). Diandra and her lover Ruth had three guest appearances.	CBS; 1992-1995
High Society	Stephano	Luigi Amodeo	Stephano is Dot's (Mary McDonnell) assistant. The show was cancelled after 13 episodes.	CBS; 1995–1996
The John Larroquette Show	Pat	Jazzmun	A drag queen who hangs out at the bus station where the lead character works.	NBC; 1993–1996
The Larry Sanders Show	Brian	Scott Thompson	Hank Kingsley's personal assistant.	HBO; 1992–1998
Living in Captivity	Gordon	Terry Rhoads	Gordon is a gay security guard at a gated community, and often leers at the residents when they come through the gate.	FOX; 1998
Los Beltrán	Fernando Salazar	Gabriel Romero	Fernando and Kevin are gay. They are the first openly-gay characters on Spanish-language television, and first same-sex couple that marry.	Telemundo; 1999–2001
Los Beltrán	Kevin Lynch	James C. Leary	Fernando and Kevin are gay. They are the first openly-gay characters on Spanish-language television, and first same-sex couple that marry.	Telemundo; 1999–2001
Lush Life	Nelson "Margarita" Marquez	John Ortiz	Nelson is a gay bartender, hence the nickname Margarita. The show only lasted for four episodes.	Fox; 1996
Mad About You	Debbie Buchman	Robin Bartlett	Debbie is Paul's (Paul Reiser) sister and came out in 1996 on the show. Joan is Debbie's life partner and is also Jamie's (Helen Hunt) gynecologist.	NBC; 1992-1999
Mad About You	Dr. Joan Golfinos	Suzie Plakson	Debbie is Paul's (Paul Reiser) sister and came out in 1996 on the show. Joan is Debbie's life partner and is also Jamie's (Helen Hunt) gynecologist.	NBC; 1992-1999
Muscle	Bronwyn Jones	Amy Pietz	Lead character Bronwyn is a lesbian news anchor.	The WB; 1995
Northern Exposure	Ron Bantz	Doug Ballard	Ron and Erick are a gay couple who buy a house from Maurice (Barry Corbin) to open an upscale bed and breakfast called the Sourdough Inn. They get married in the fifth season of the series.	CBS; 1990-1995
Northern Exposure	Erick Hillman	Don McManus	Ron and Erick are a gay couple who buy a house from Maurice (Barry Corbin) to open an upscale bed and breakfast called the Sourdough Inn. They get married in the fifth season of the series.	CBS; 1990-1995
Northern Exposure	Cicely	Yvonne Suhor	The fictitious town of Cicely Alaska, where the show takes place, was founded by lesbian partners Cicely and Rosyln in 1908 when their car broke down in the Alaskan wilderness. Their story was told in the final episode of 1992.	CBS; 1990-1995
Northern Exposure	Rosyln	Jo Anderson	The fictitious town of Cicely Alaska, where the show takes place, was founded by lesbian partners Cicely and Rosyln in 1908 when their car broke down in the Alaskan wilderness. Their story was told in the final episode of 1992.	CBS; 1990-1995
Oh, Grow Up	Ford Lowell	John Ducey	Ford is a married man who left his wife after realizing he was gay. Sal is lead character Hunter's (Stephen Dunham) boss.	ABC; 1999
Oh, Grow Up	Sal	Ed Marinaro	Ford is a married man who left his wife after realizing he was gay. Sal is lead character Hunter's (Stephen Dunham) boss.	ABC; 1999
Party Girl	Derrick	John Cameron Mitchell	Short-lived sitcom based on the 1995 theatrical film.	Fox; 1996
Public Morals	John Irvin	Bill Brochtrup	John Irvin, an administrative assistant, imported into the show from NYPD Blue, and returned after the cancellation of Public Morals. The series was poorly received and was canceled after airing only one episode.	CBS; 1996
The Pursuit of Happiness	Alex Chosek	Brad Garrett	Alex comes out to his partner Steve.	NBC; 1995
Rude Awakening	Jackie Garcia	Rain Pryor	Jackie is a lesbian and recovering drug addict.	Showtime; 1998-2001
Sex and the City	Stanford Blatch	Willie Garson	Stanford and Anthony are married. Liza Minnelli sang at their wedding. Samantha is bisexual and has a romance with a woman, Maria (Sônia Braga).	HBO; 1998–2004
Sex and the City	Anthony Marantino	Mario Cantone	Stanford and Anthony are married. Liza Minnelli sang at their wedding. Samantha is bisexual and has a romance with a woman, Maria (Sônia Braga).	HBO; 1998–2004
Sex and the City	Samantha Jones	Kim Cattrall	Stanford and Anthony are married. Liza Minnelli sang at their wedding. Samantha is bisexual and has a romance with a woman, Maria (Sônia Braga).	HBO; 1998–2004
Spin City	Carter Heywood	Michael Boatman	Carter is the openly gay minority affairs liaison.	ABC; 1996–2002
Strangers with Candy	Jerri Blank	Amy Sedaris	Jerri is bisexual, an ex-con, ex-junkie, ex-prostitute, and high-school freshman.	Comedy Central; 1999–2000
Strangers with Candy	Geoffrey Jellineck	Paul Dinello	Jellineck and Noblet are teachers at fictitious school Flatpoint High and are having a secret gay affair.	Comedy Central; 1999–2000
Strangers with Candy	Chuck Noblet	Stephen Colbert	Jellineck and Noblet are teachers at fictitious school Flatpoint High and are having a secret gay affair.	Comedy Central; 1999–2000
Suddenly Susan	Pete Fontaine	Bill Stevenson	Pete is gay and works in the mailroom. Pete and his partner Hank got married in the episode "Oh How They Danced".	NBC; 1996-2000
Suddenly Susan	Hank	Fred Stoller	Pete is gay and works in the mailroom. Pete and his partner Hank got married in the episode "Oh How They Danced".	NBC; 1996-2000
Suddenly Susan	Carlos	Bruno Campos	Luis' (Nestor Carbonell) brother Carlos comes out in episode "A Boy like That".	NBC; 1996-2000
Terry and Julian	Julian	Julian Clary	Julian is a very flamboyant gay that lives in Terry's flat. Clary is openly gay as well.	Channel 4; 1992
Unhappily Ever After	Barry Wallenstein	Ant	Barry is a recurring character, and Tiffany's (Nikki Cox) openly gay friend at Priddy High.	The WB; 1995-1999
Veronica's Closet	Josh Blair	Wallace Langham	Josh's sexuality was obfuscated as a running joke until he came out in the episode "Veronica Helps Josh Out".	NBC; 1997–2000
The Vicar of Dibley	Frank Pickle	John Bluthal	Frank came out as gay live on the radio. Unfortunately, such is his reputation for dullness, Geraldine is his only listener.	BBC; 1994–1999
Will & Grace	Will Truman	Eric McCormack	Will is a lawyer who lives in New York City with his best friend, Grace Adler. Jack is Will's best friend and helps Will come out and find the confidence to start dating men. Vince dated Will, and then eventually married him in the original series finale (2006). However, in the 2017 reboot of the series, Will's marriage to Vince, and their child Ben is nixed, the whole previous finale explained away by a dream of Karens.	NBC; 1998–2006
Will & Grace	Jack McFarland	Sean Hayes	Will is a lawyer who lives in New York City with his best friend, Grace Adler. Jack is Will's best friend and helps Will come out and find the confidence to start dating men. Vince dated Will, and then eventually married him in the original series finale (2006). However, in the 2017 reboot of the series, Will's marriage to Vince, and their child Ben is nixed, the whole previous finale explained away by a dream of Karens.	NBC; 1998–2006
Will & Grace	Vince D'Angelo	Bobby Cannavale	Will is a lawyer who lives in New York City with his best friend, Grace Adler. Jack is Will's best friend and helps Will come out and find the confidence to start dating men. Vince dated Will, and then eventually married him in the original series finale (2006). However, in the 2017 reboot of the series, Will's marriage to Vince, and their child Ben is nixed, the whole previous finale explained away by a dream of Karens.	NBC; 1998–2006
You Rang, M'Lord?	Cissy Meldrum	Catherine Rabett	Cissy is Lord Meldrum's elder daughter. She dresses in a masculine style and takes part in men's sports and activities.	BBC; 1990–1993

== 2000s ==
Show	Character	Actor	Notes	Network Series run
30 Rock	Devon Banks	Will Arnett	Devon is Jack Donaghy's (Alec Baldwin) smarmy gay nemesis. Arnett has earned four Emmy nominations for his guest role.	NBC; 2006–2013
30 Rock	Jonathan	Maulik Pancholy	Jonathan is gay, and Jack's loyal and overprotective personal assistant, who at times appears to be possibly in love with Jack.	NBC; 2006–2013
30 Rock	J.D. Lutz	John Lutz	J.D. is bisexual, and a lazy overweight TGS writer who is often insulted or made fun of by the rest of the staff.	NBC; 2006–2013
30 Rock	Randy Lemon	Jeffery Self	Randy is Liz Lemon's (Tina Fey) naive gay cousin, who is constantly educating Liz about gay slang. Self is openly gay.	NBC; 2006–2013
Aquí no hay quien viva (No One Could Live Here)	Mauri Hidalgo	Luis Merlo	Mauri is a gay journalist who used to work for a Cosmopolitan-type magazine. He is married to Fernando Navarro.	Antena 3; 2003–2006
Aquí no hay quien viva (No One Could Live Here)	Fernando Navarro	Adrià Collado	Fernando is a gay lawyer who lost his job when he came out. He decided to start his own practice and is married to Mauri.	Antena 3; 2003–2006
Aquí no hay quien viva (No One Could Live Here)	Bea Villarejo	Eva Isanta	Mauri's lesbian roommate and best friend. She moved in with Mauri after breaking up with her girlfriend.	Antena 3; 2003–2006
Aquí no hay quien viva (No One Could Live Here)	Diego Álvarez	Mariano Alameda	Diego has an affair with Mauri, but breaks it off after meeting Abel, the male nanny of Mauri's son. Diego and Abel are married.	Antena 3; 2003–2006
Aquí no hay quien viva (No One Could Live Here)	Rosa Izquierdo	María Almudéver	Rosa is a lesbian, and a lawyer and was Bea's girlfriend in season 3	Antena 3; 2003–2006
Aquí no hay quien viva (No One Could Live Here)	Ana	Vanesa Romero	Ana is an air hostess who, after a passionate night with Bea, ends up accepting she's a lesbian. She also sporadically works as a model.	Antena 3; 2003–2006
Aquí no hay quien viva (No One Could Live Here)	Abel	Alberto Maneiro	Abel is Mauri's nanny and married to Diego.	Antena 3; 2003–2006
Arrested Development	George Oscar "Gob" Bluth II	Will Arnett	GOB is a part-time magician and founding member of the "Magicians' Alliance". He is hinted to be bisexual throughout the series, and ends up having sex with his enemy, Tony Wonder.	Fox; Netflix; 2003–2006; 2013–
Arrested Development	Tony Wonder	Ben Stiller	Tony is a professional magician who commonly works at the fictitious Gothic Castle and is known for baking himself into a loaf of bread and emerging.	Fox; Netflix; 2003–2006; 2013–
Benidorm	Kenneth Du Beke	Tony Maudsley	Kenneth is a gay hairdresser who doesn't apologize for his behaviour.	ITV; 2007–
Benidorm	Troy Ramsbottom	Paul Bazely	Troy and Gavin are married. The pair have a successful hair salon.	ITV; 2007–
Benidorm	Gavin Ramsbottom	Hugh Sachs	Troy and Gavin are married. The pair have a successful hair salon.	ITV; 2007–
Bullyparade	Käpt'n Kork	Christian Tramitz	The three stereotypically gay characters are part of the Star Trek parody Unser (T)Raumschiff.	ProSieben 1997–2002
Bullyparade	Schrotty	Rick Kavanian	The three stereotypically gay characters are part of the Star Trek parody Unser (T)Raumschiff.	ProSieben 1997–2002
Bullyparade	Mr. Spuck	Michael Herbig	The three stereotypically gay characters are part of the Star Trek parody Unser (T)Raumschiff.	ProSieben 1997–2002
The Business	Terrence Von Holtzen	Matt Silver	Terrence is a closeted intern who is the Associate Co-head of the Animation and Historical Adaptation Department.	The Movie Network; IFC; 2006–2007
The Class	Kyle Lendo	Sean Maguire	Kyle and Aaron are in a relationship. Kyle is a first-grade teacher at the fictitious Pembridge Academy, an elite private school. Aaron is a software engineer for an internet security firm.	CBS; 2006–2007
The Class	Aaron	Cristian de la Fuente	Kyle and Aaron are in a relationship. Kyle is a first-grade teacher at the fictitious Pembridge Academy, an elite private school. Aaron is a software engineer for an internet security firm.	CBS; 2006–2007
The Comeback	Mickey Deane	Robert Michael Morris	Mickey is a hairdresser and confidant to lead character Valerie Cherish (Lisa Kudrow) who, despite being obviously gay, believes he is closeted.	HBO; 2005
Crumbs	Mitch Crumb	Fred Savage	Mitch is a gay struggling movie screenwriter who returns home to take care of his mother (Jane Curtin), who has recently been released from a mental institution after trying to run over her husband (William Devane).	ABC; 2006
Entourage	Lloyd	Rex Lee	Lloyd is gay and the head of the TV department. The premise of the show is loosely based on Mark Wahlberg's experiences as an up-and-coming film star.	HBO; 2004–2011
Glee	Kurt Hummel	Chris Colfer	Kurt is the first gay character to come out in season one of Glee.	Fox; 2009–2015
Glee	Sandy Ryerson	Stephen Tobolowsky	He is revealed to be gay in season two.	Fox; 2009–2015
Glee	Blaine Anderson	Darren Criss	Blaine and Kurt start dating and eventually get married.	Fox; 2009–2015
Glee	Dave Karofsky	Max Adler	Dave is the school bully who picks on the Glee crew, comes out in season two.	Fox; 2009–2015
Glee	Sebastian Smythe	Grant Gustin	Sebastian is gay and the lead singer of the fictitious Dalton Academy Warblers.	Fox; 2009–2015
Glee	Brittany Pierce	Heather Morris	Brittany is an openly bisexual cheerleader.	Fox; 2009–2015
Glee	Santana Lopez	Naya Rivera	Santana dates Brittany and in season two, she comes out to her grandmother.	Fox; 2009–2015
Glee	Hiram Berry	Jeff Goldblum	Hiram and LeRoy Berry are Rachel's fathers. They debuted in episode "Heart"	Fox; 2009–2015
Glee	LeRoy Berry	Brian Stokes Mitchell	Hiram and LeRoy Berry are Rachel's fathers. They debuted in episode "Heart"	Fox; 2009–2015
Glee	Unique Adams	Alex Newell	Unique is a transgender girl.	Fox; 2009–2015
Glee	Sheldon Beiste	Dot-Marie Jones	In season six, he comes out as transgender making him the first trans man on the show.	Fox; 2009–2015
Go Girls	Levi Hirsh	Leon Wadham	Levi is a sassy gay Jewish man whose pledge is to get revenge.	TVNZ 2; 2009–2013
Go Girls	Kent	Josh McKenzie	Levi's ex-boyfriend and first love since high school.	TVNZ 2; 2009–2013
Grosse Pointe	Richard Towers	Michael Hitchcock	A behind-the-scenes drama on the set of a television show. Richard is a closeted gay character who ogles his on-screen son and finds ways to see him without clothes on.	WB; 2000–2001
How I Met Your Mother	James Stinson	Wayne Brady	James is Barney Stinson's gay black brother. He is married to Tom and they have 2 children together.	CBS; 2005–2014
It's All Relative	Simon Banks	Christopher Sieber	Simon and Philip are life partners with an adoptive daughter, Liz (Maggie Lawson). Liz gets engaged to Bobby O'Neill (Reid Scott) who comes from a conservative blue-collar family. Bobby's father is a bigot, upset about Philip and Simon being a gay couple.	ABC; 2003–2004
It's All Relative	Philip Stoddard	John Benjamin Hickey	Simon and Philip are life partners with an adoptive daughter, Liz (Maggie Lawson). Liz gets engaged to Bobby O'Neill (Reid Scott) who comes from a conservative blue-collar family. Bobby's father is a bigot, upset about Philip and Simon being a gay couple.	ABC; 2003–2004
It's Always Sunny in Philadelphia	Ronald "Mac" MacDonald	Rob McElhenney	A long-running theme on the show is the ambiguity surrounding Mac's sexuality which culminates in him coming out as gay in season 12. The series is the longest-running live-action comedy series in American television history.	FXX; 2005–
It's Always Sunny in Philadelphia	Country Mac	Seann William Scott	Country Mac is gay. Mac invites along his cousin, Country Mac, in episode "Mac Day", where each gang member gets their own day to do whatever they want with no complaints from the others. When they visit a gym full of bodybuilders, Mac insists the gang help oil them up. Country Mac is happy to assist, revealing to the gang that he is gay.	FXX; 2005–
It's Me...Gerald	Gerald	Gerald L'Ecuyer	Gerald is a struggling gay theatre director trying to stage a production of Hedda Gabler. He tries to find the money by any means necessary to finance his vision, while a camera crew documents his efforts.	Showcase; 2005
Kick	Layla	Nicole Chamoun	Layla is a Muslim-Australian who lives with her conservative family and is engaged to Sharif. But when she falls in love with Jackie, she has to choose between following her heart or making her family happy.	SBS; 2007
Kick	Jackie	Romi Trower	Layla is a Muslim-Australian who lives with her conservative family and is engaged to Sharif. But when she falls in love with Jackie, she has to choose between following her heart or making her family happy.	SBS; 2007
Modern Family	Mitchell Pritchett	Jesse Tyler Ferguson	Mitchell and Cam are married, and raising their adoptive daughter Lily.	ABC; 2009–2020
Modern Family	Cameron Tucker	Eric Stonestreet	Mitchell and Cam are married, and raising their adoptive daughter Lily.	ABC; 2009–2020
Modern Family	Crispin	Craig Zimmerman	Crispin is one of Mitchell and Cameron's gay friends.	ABC; 2009–2020
Modern Family	Longines	Kevin Daniels	Longines is one of Mitchell and Cameron's gay friends.	ABC; 2009–2020
Modern Family	Pam	Wendi McLendon-Covey	Pam and Susan are a lesbian couple with a kid.	ABC; 2009–2020
Modern Family	Susan	Michaela Watkins	Pam and Susan are a lesbian couple with a kid.	ABC; 2009–2020
Modern Family	Ronaldo	Christian Barillas	Ronaldo is Pepper Saltzman's assistant and later husband.	ABC; 2009–2020
Modern Family	Pepper Saltzman	Nathan Lane	Pepper is one of Mitchell and Cameron's gay friends, and married to Ronaldo.	ABC; 2009–2020
Modern Family	Steven	Colin Hanlon	Recurring gay couple, friends of Mitchell and Cameron.	ABC; 2009–2020
Modern Family	Stefan	Rodrigo Rojas	Recurring gay couple, friends of Mitchell and Cameron.	ABC; 2009–2020
Mord mit Aussicht (Murder with a View)	Bärbel Schmied	Meike Droste	Bärbel is bisexual and falls in love with Mathilde. They have a short affair in "Waltzing Mathilde".	Das Erste; 2008–2014
Mord mit Aussicht (Murder with a View)	Mathilde	Alwara Höfels	Bärbel is bisexual and falls in love with Mathilde. They have a short affair in "Waltzing Mathilde".	Das Erste; 2008–2014
My Family	Michael Harper	Gabriel Thomson	After coming home drunk, Michael comes out as gay to Ben and then later to Susan, in the second episode of series 10 "The Son'll Come Out".	BBC1; 2000–2011
My Name is Earl	Kenny James	Gregg Binkley	Kenny is gay, but kept it hidden until Earl helped him come out. He later was in a relationship with Stuart.	NBC; 2005–2009
My Name is Earl	Stuart Daniels	Mike O'Malley	Stuart was a policeman who lost his badge after it was stolen by Earl. He was a closeted bisexual but later engaged in a relationship with Kenny.	NBC; 2005–2009
Normal, Ohio	William "Butch" Gamble	John Goodman	Butch comes out to his wife Joan (Anita Gillette) and son Charlie (Greg Pitts) and moves to California. He returns home four years later to attend a going away party for his son, who's going to medical school. When Charlie decides not to leave, Butch stays in Ohio and moves in with his sister Pam (Joely Fisher). The original concept for this series was titled Don't Ask.	Fox; 2000
Nurse Jackie	Mohammed de la Cruz	Haaz Sleiman	Mohammed and Thor are gay nurses at the fictitious All Saints' Hospital. Mohammed was dropped after the first season. The producers stated the reason being "the character's storyline ran its course".	Showtime; 2009–2015
Nurse Jackie	Thor Lundgren	Stephen Wallem	Mohammed and Thor are gay nurses at the fictitious All Saints' Hospital. Mohammed was dropped after the first season. The producers stated the reason being "the character's storyline ran its course".	Showtime; 2009–2015
Nurse Jackie	Dr. Eleanor O'Hara	Eve Best	Eleanor is bisexual and in a relationship with a female journalist in season 2.	Showtime; 2009–2015
The Office	Oscar Martinez	Oscar Nuñez	Oscar is an accountant at the office, and was outed by his boss Michael Scott (Steve Carell) during the episode called "Gay Witch Hunt" in season three. Gil is his partner who lived with him.	NBC; 2005–2013
The Office	Gil	Tom Chick	Oscar is an accountant at the office, and was outed by his boss Michael Scott (Steve Carell) during the episode called "Gay Witch Hunt" in season three. Gil is his partner who lived with him.	NBC; 2005–2013
The Office	Matt	Sam Daly	Matt is known as the "gay warehouse guy" at the fictitious Dunder Mifflin Scranton Warehouse. Oscar secretly has a crush on him.	NBC; 2005–2013
The Office	Robert Lipton	Jack Coleman	Oscar realized Robert was gay as soon as they met. Oscar did eventually give in to Robert and the two started an affair.	NBC; 2005–2013
Our Hero	Ross Korolus	Justin Peroff	Ross is one of the best friends of main protagonist Kale Stiglic, who discovers that he is gay during the course of the series.	CBC; 2000–2002
Out of Practice	Regina Barnes	Paula Marshall	Regina is a lesbian E.R. doctor, who is infatuated with attractive women.	CBS; 2005–2006
Peep Show	Jeremy 'Jez' Usborne	Robert Webb	Hinted earlier in the series to be bisexual, and confirmed in episodes "Gregory's Beard", where Jez has sex with Joe, and "Threeism", where Jez has sex with Megan and Joe. He also discusses his sexuality openly with roommate Mark Corrigan.	Channel 4; 2003–2015
Reaper	Tony	Ken Marino	Tony and Steve are a gay couple who live next door to the main trio of Sam, Sock, and Ben. It is later learned they are demons waging a war against the Devil. Steve is killed during the rebellion and manages to get into Heaven. He later becomes Sam's guardian angel.	The CW; 2007–2009
Reaper	Steve	Michael Ian Black	Tony and Steve are a gay couple who live next door to the main trio of Sam, Sock, and Ben. It is later learned they are demons waging a war against the Devil. Steve is killed during the rebellion and manages to get into Heaven. He later becomes Sam's guardian angel.	The CW; 2007–2009
Reno 911!	Lieutenant Dangle	Thomas Lennon	Dangle is openly gay and sees no problem flirting with and trying to seduce straight men, even those he stops for infractions.	Comedy Central; 2003–2009
Reno 911!	Deputy Kimball	Mary Birdsong	She is a possibly closeted lesbian, and is perpetually accused of being a lesbian, despite her denials when asked, and when asked for dates by lesbians.	Comedy Central; 2003–2009
The Sarah Silverman Program	Brian	Brian Posehn	Sarah's gay neighbors and friends, who are partners.	Comedy Central; 2007–2010
The Sarah Silverman Program	Steve	Steve Agee	Sarah's gay neighbors and friends, who are partners.	Comedy Central; 2007–2010
Scrubs	Todd Quinlan ("The Todd")	Robert Maschio	Initially portrayed as womanizing and heterosexual, Todd displays same-sex attractions as well and eventually reveals that he is attracted to almost everyone he sees, regardless of gender. He later enters into a three-way sexual relationship with a man and woman.	NBC; 2001–2010
Seven Periods with Mr Gormsby	Alisdair Morton	Thomas Robins	Alisdair is a teacher at the fictional Tepapawai High School. His life changes when he is outed by Mr Gormsby. Previously secretive about his sexuality he starts openly selling tickets to gay and lesbian balls and dressing more flamboyantly.	TVNZ 1; 2005–2006
Seven Periods with Mr Gormsby	Lesley Tangaroa	Grace Hoet	Lesley teaches physical education at the fictional Tepapawai High School. She is a lesbian, and a totally unfit Ngāti Porou.	TVNZ 1; 2005–2006
Some of My Best Friends	Warren Fairbanks	Jason Bateman	Warren is a mild-mannered gay writer living in Greenwich Village. The series was inspired by the film Kiss Me, Guido.	CBS; 2001
Some of My Best Friends	Vern Limoso	Alec Mapa	Vern is Warren's flamboyant gay best friend, who lives upstairs and usually enters Warren's apartment by coming down the fire escape and through a window.	CBS; 2001
So NoTORIous	Sasan	Zachary Quinto	Sasan is an Iranian-American Muslim who hasn't told his parents he's gay.	VH1; 2006
Sophie	Matt Scott	Jeff Geddis	Matt is gay and an OB/GYN and Sophie's best friend.	CBC; 2008–2009
Sordid Lives: The Series	Earl "Brother Boy" Ingram	Leslie Jordan	Brother Boy is a drag queen and likes to perform as Tammy Wynette. He tries to escape from treatments to "dehomosexualize" him.	Logo; 2008
Sordid Lives: The Series	Ty Williamson	Jason Dottley	Ty is an actor in Los Angeles coming to terms with his homosexuality.	Logo; 2008
That '80s Show	Sophia	Brittany Daniel	Sophia is bisexual and has a crush on Katie.	CBS; 2002
Trailer Park Boys	Jim Lahey	John Dunsworth	Jim is bisexual, and a drunk trailer-park supervisor of the fictional Sunnyvale Trailer Park.	Showcase; Netflix; 2001–2007; 2014–2018
Trailer Park Boys	Randy	Patrick Roach	Randy is Jim's assistant at the trailer park, and his overweight bisexual lover.	Showcase; Netflix; 2001–2007; 2014–2018
Twins	Neil	Christopher Fitzgerald	Neil is a flamboyantly gay technician.	The WB; 2005–2006
Two and a Half Men	Evelyn Harper	Holland Taylor	Evelyn is bisexual and the mother of Charlie and Alan Harper.	CBS; 2003–2015
Two and a Half Men	Jenny Harper	Amber Tamblyn	Jenny, the previously unknown daughter of Charlie, is lesbian. She engages in several one-night stands with various women (introduced in season 11).	CBS; 2003–2015
Ugly Betty	Alexis Meade	Rebecca Romijn	Alexis is Daniel's trans sister.	ABC; 2006–2010
Ugly Betty	Alexis Meade	Elizabeth Payne	Alexis is Daniel's trans sister.	ABC; 2006–2010
United States of Tara	Marshall Gregson	Keir Gilchrist	Marshall is an openly gay teenager, and not once does he shy away from who he is. Lionel is Marshall's boyfriend.	Showtime; 2009–2011
United States of Tara	Lionel Trane	Michael J. Willett	Marshall is an openly gay teenager, and not once does he shy away from who he is. Lionel is Marshall's boyfriend.	Showtime; 2009–2011
United States of Tara	Ted Mayo	Michael Hitchcock	Openly gay neighbor of the family.	Showtime; 2009–2011
The War at Home	Khaleel "Kenny" Al-Bahir	Rami Malek	Kenny is a 16-year-old boy who harbors a secret crush on his best friend Larry and is subsequently kicked out of his house when his parents find out he's gay.	Fox; 2005–2007
Wizards of Waverly Place	Alex Russo	Selena Gomez	The showruner of confirmed that Alex was bisexual.	Disney Channel; 2007–2012

== 2010s ==
Show	Character	Actor	Notes	Network Series run
195 Lewis	Yuri	Rae Leone Allen	Yuri is lesbian. Camille is lesbian. Yuri and Camille are a couple experimenting with polyamory.	One Nine Five Lewis; 2017
195 Lewis	Camille	Sirita Wright	Yuri is lesbian. Camille is lesbian. Yuri and Camille are a couple experimenting with polyamory.	One Nine Five Lewis; 2017
American Housewife	Angela	Carly Hughes	Angela is a lesbian and one of Katie's best friends and fellow moms.	ABC; 2016–2021
Andi Mack	Cyrus Goodman	Joshua Rush	Cyrus is in a relationship with TJ Kippen. It is the first gay relationship on Disney Channel, and Cyrus is the first gay main character.	Disney Channel; 2017–2019
Andi Mack	TJ Kippen	Luke Mullen	Cyrus is in a relationship with TJ Kippen. It is the first gay relationship on Disney Channel, and Cyrus is the first gay main character.	Disney Channel; 2017–2019
Anger Management	Patrick	Michael Arden	Patrick is gay and Charlie's passive-aggressive anger-management patient.	FX; 2012–2014
Another Period	Victor	Brian Huskey	Victor and Albert are a gay couple. Dr. Goldberg is gay.	Comedy Central; 2015–2018
Another Period	Albert	David Wain	Victor and Albert are a gay couple. Dr. Goldberg is gay.	Comedy Central; 2015–2018
Another Period	Dr. John Goldberg	Moshe Kasher	Victor and Albert are a gay couple. Dr. Goldberg is gay.	Comedy Central; 2015–2018
Awkward	Clark Stevenson	Joey Haro	Clark is outed by the school bully in the season one finale. Clark is caught making out with Ricky in the final episode of season two.	MTV; 2011–2016
Awkward	Ricky Schwartz	Matthew Fahey	Ricky is bisexual, and has had relations with Tamara and Sadie, and in the second-season finale was with Clark.	MTV; 2011–2016
Awkward	Tamara Kaplan	Jillian Rose Reed	Tamara comes out as bisexual in the second-season finale.	MTV; 2011–2016
Awkward	Theo Abbott	Cole Higgins	Theo and Cole are openly gay, and best friends. They are a bit obnoxious, and trouble makers.	MTV; 2011–2016
Awkward	Evan Crooks	Monty Geer	Theo and Cole are openly gay, and best friends. They are a bit obnoxious, and trouble makers.	MTV; 2011–2016
Barry	NoHo Hank	Anthony Carrigan	NoHo Hank is a gay member of the Chechen mafia, who begins a relationship with Cristobal, the leader of the Bolivian mafia.	HBO; 2018-2023
Barry	Cristobal Sifuentes	Michael Irby	NoHo Hank is a gay member of the Chechen mafia, who begins a relationship with Cristobal, the leader of the Bolivian mafia.	HBO; 2018-2023
Black-ish	Sharon Duckworth	Elle Young	Rhona and Sharon are exes.	ABC; 2014-2022
Black-ish	Rhonda Johnson	Raven-Symoné	Rhona and Sharon are exes.	ABC; 2014-2022
Black-ish	Kim	N/A	Kim and Stella are married.	ABC; 2014-2022
Black-ish	Stella	Jessica Leigh Gonzales	Kim and Stella are married.	ABC; 2014-2022
Black-ish	Laura	Edi Patterson	Laura is bisexual.	ABC; 2014-2022
Black Monday	Keith Shankar	Paul Scheer	Keith is a closeted gay.	Showtime; 2019–2021
Black Monday	Blair Pfaff	Andrew Rannells	Blair is revealed to be gay at the end of Season 1. In season 2 he starts having an affair with a married man, congressman Roger Harris.	Showtime; 2019–2021
Black Monday	Roger Harris	Tuc Watkins	Blair is revealed to be gay at the end of Season 1. In season 2 he starts having an affair with a married man, congressman Roger Harris.	Showtime; 2019–2021
Blue Mountain State	Debra Simon	Denise Richards	Debra is the football coach's ex-wife, she sleeps with a lot of the football players, her ex-husband, and a cheerleader.	Spike; 2010–2011
Blue Mountain State	Mary Jo Cacciatore	Frankie Shaw	Mary Jo is in love with the quarterback and a cheerleader. No one likes her, mostly because she comes to practice drunk.	Spike; 2010–2011
Boy Meets Girl	Judy	Rebecca Root	Judy is a male-to-female transexual.	BBC Two; 2015–2016
Boy Meets Girl	Charlie	Tyler Luke Cunningham	Charlie is a female-to-male transexual. Charlie and Judy both attend the same support group.	BBC Two; 2015–2016
Broad City	Ilana Wexler	Ilana Glazer	Ilana is bisexual.	Comedy Central; 2014–2019
Broad City	Abbi Abrams	Abbi Jacobson	Abbi is bisexual.	Comedy Central; 2014–2019
Broad City	Jaime Castro	Arturo Castro	Jaime is gay.	Comedy Central; 2014–2019
Broad City	Matt Bevers	John Gemberling	Matt is a closeted bisexual.	Comedy Central; 2014–2019
Broad City	Lesley Marnel	Clea DuVall	Lesley is lesbian.	Comedy Central; 2014–2019
Brooklyn Nine-Nine	Captain Ray Holt	Andre Braugher	Captain Holt is the openly gay captain of the 99th Police Precinct. Kevin is Holt's husband.	Fox; NBC; 2013–2021
Brooklyn Nine-Nine	Kevin Cozner	Marc Evan Jackson	Captain Holt is the openly gay captain of the 99th Police Precinct. Kevin is Holt's husband.	Fox; NBC; 2013–2021
Brooklyn Nine-Nine	Rosa Diaz	Stephanie Beatriz	Rosa Diaz is a detective and comes out as bisexual in episode "99" after a fellow detective overhears a woman calling her "babe" on the phone.	Fox; NBC; 2013–2021
Bunk'd	Wayne	Jacob Herren	In "No Pain, No Grain", Winnie's brother Wayne proposed to his boyfriend Nicholas. It is the first same-sex marriage proposal on Disney Channel.	Disney Channel; 2015–2024
Bunk'd	Nicholas	Frankie Rodriguez	In "No Pain, No Grain", Winnie's brother Wayne proposed to his boyfriend Nicholas. It is the first same-sex marriage proposal on Disney Channel.	Disney Channel; 2015–2024
Carol's A Demon	Carol	Brittany Ashley	Carol is a lesbian, and a 3,000-year-old demon trying to get into heaven to be with her true love, a nun.	YouTube; 2018
Carol's A Demon	Sofia	Ash Perez (billed as Ashly Perez)	Sofia is a lesbian. Sofia and her friends accidentally summon a 3,000-year-old demon with a Ouija board. Sofia helps the demon (Carol) stop an impending apocalypse, so she gets into heaven.	YouTube; 2018
Carol's Second Act	Dr. Lexie Gilani	Sabrina Jalees	Lexie is lesbian.	CBS; 2019–2020
Champions	Michael Patel	Josie Totah	Michael is a 15-year-old gay teenager who lives with his father and uncle in Brooklyn. Ruby is a lesbian and trainer at the gym.	NBC; 2018
Champions	Ruby	Fortune Feimster	Michael is a 15-year-old gay teenager who lives with his father and uncle in Brooklyn. Ruby is a lesbian and trainer at the gym.	NBC; 2018
Clipped	Buzzy	George Wendt	Buzzy is gay, and the owner of a hair salon. Tommy is a gay cop, his partner and later husband.	TBS; 2015
Clipped	Tommy	Reginald VelJohnson	Buzzy is gay, and the owner of a hair salon. Tommy is a gay cop, his partner and later husband.	TBS; 2015
The Cool Kids	Sid	Leslie Jordan	Sid is an elderly gay man living in a retirement home. He claims to have come out to his wife just before Y2K.	Fox; 2018–2019
Crazy Ex-Girlfriend	'White Josh' Wilson	David Hull	White Josh is gay.	The CW; 2015–2019
Crazy Ex-Girlfriend	Darryl Whitefeather	Pete Gardner	Darryl is bisexual, and in a relationship with White Josh before starting a relationship with a woman.	The CW; 2015–2019
Crazy Ex-Girlfriend	Maya	Esther Povitsky	Maya is bisexual.	The CW; 2015–2019
Crazy Ex-Girlfriend	Valencia Perez	Gabrielle Ruiz	Valencia becomes aware that she is bisexual when she starts dating a woman named Beth (Emma Willmann) late in Season 3.	The CW; 2015–2019
Dead to Me	Judy Hale	Linda Cardellini	Judy is bisexual. She was engaged to Steve Wood and becomes romantically involved with Michelle. Michelle is lesbian. Ana is lesbian and the ex-girlfriend of Michelle.	Netflix; 2019–2022
Dead to Me	Michelle Gutierrez	Natalie Morales	Judy is bisexual. She was engaged to Steve Wood and becomes romantically involved with Michelle. Michelle is lesbian. Ana is lesbian and the ex-girlfriend of Michelle.	Netflix; 2019–2022
Dead to Me	Det. Ana Perez	Diana-Maria Riva	Judy is bisexual. She was engaged to Steve Wood and becomes romantically involved with Michelle. Michelle is lesbian. Ana is lesbian and the ex-girlfriend of Michelle.	Netflix; 2019–2022
Death Valley	Carla Rinaldi	Tania Raymonde	Carla is a lesbian, and an officer in the Undead Task Force (UTF), a newly formed division of the LAPD, that captures the monsters that roam the streets of San Fernando Valley. She is in a relationship with Julia.	MTV; 2011
Death Valley	Julia	Stacey LaBerge	Julia is a bisexual bartender, and in a relationship with Carla Rinaldi.	MTV; 2011
Derry Girls	Clare Devlin	Nicola Coughlan	Clare comes out as a lesbian (series 1, episode 6).	Channel 4; 2018–2022
Detroiters	Lea	Lailana Ledesma	Lea is gay. In episode "Jefferson Porger", it is revealed that she has a girlfriend, Scarlett.	Comedy Central; 2017–2018
Dickinson	Emily Dickinson	Hailee Steinfeld	Emily and Susan are in a secret homosexual relationship.	Apple TV+ 2019–2021
Dickinson	Susan Gilbert	Ella Hunt	Emily and Susan are in a secret homosexual relationship.	Apple TV+ 2019–2021
Dirk Gently's Holistic Detective Agency	Panto Trost	Christopher Russell	Panto and Silas are a gay couple.	BBC America; 2016–2017
Dirk Gently's Holistic Detective Agency	Silas Dengdamor	Lee Majdoub	Panto and Silas are a gay couple.	BBC America; 2016–2017
Dr. Ken	Clark Leslie Beavers	Jonathan Slavin	Clark and Connor are a gay couple.	ABC; 2015–2017
Dr. Ken	Connor	Stephen Guarino	Clark and Connor are a gay couple.	ABC; 2015–2017
Dollface	Stella Cole	Shay Mitchell	Stella is bisexual.	Hulu; 2019–2022
Episodes	Andy Button	Joseph May	Andy is gay and the head of casting of the network. By the end of Season 1, he is fired because he likes the talking dog show.	Showtime; 2011–2017
Episodes	Helen Basch	Andrea Savage	Helen is a lesbian who demonstrates good instincts about creative ideas but is prone to jealousy.	Showtime; 2011–2017
Episodes	Carol Rance	Kathleen Rose Perkins	Carol is bisexual and the network's head of programming. She becomes good friends with Beverly, with whom she often goes hiking and smokes pot.	Showtime; 2011–2017
Faking It	Amy Raudenfeld	Rita Volk	Amy is a fake lesbian in the first season. In the second season, she has secret feelings for her best friend Karma.	MTV; 2014–2016
Faking It	Karma Ashcroft	Katie Stevens	Karma is a fake lesbian in the first season. In the second season, she kisses Amy passionately in a pool at a party (after showing hints that she might have feelings for her).	MTV; 2014–2016
Faking It	Shane Harvey	Michael J. Willett	Shane, the most popular boy in school, is openly gay.	MTV; 2014–2016
Faking It	Lauren Cooper	Bailey De Young	Lauren is intersex (the first intersex main character on a television show).	MTV; 2014–2016
Faking It	Noah	Elliot Fletcher	Noah is transgender and gay.	MTV; 2014–2016
Faking It	Brad	Sidney Franklin	Brad is asexual.	MTV; 2014–2016
Faking It	Sabrina	Sophia Taylor Ali	Sabrina is Karma and Amy's old friend who later confess her love for Amy.	MTV; 2014–2016
Faking It	Pablo	Anthony Palacios	Pablo is a celibate gay.	MTV; 2014–2016
Faking It	Reagan	Yvette Monreal	Reagan is a lesbian.	MTV; 2014–2016
Faking It	Duke Lewis Jr.	Skyler Maxon	Duke is a closeted gay MMA fighter/trainer.	MTV; 2014–2016
Fleabag	Belinda	Kristin Scott Thomas	Belinda is lesbian. Fleabag is bisexual.	BBC Three (season 1); BBC One (season 2); 2016-2019
Fleabag	Fleabag	Phoebe Waller-Bridge	Belinda is lesbian. Fleabag is bisexual.	BBC Three (season 1); BBC One (season 2); 2016-2019
Fresh Off the Boat	Nicole Ellis	Luna Blaise	Nicole comes out to Eddie by telling him she likes girls. In episode "A League Of Her Own" she comes out as a lesbian to her stepmother and father.	ABC; 2015–2020
Friends from College	Max Adler	Fred Savage	Max and Felix are a gay couple. Max is a literary agent, while Felix is a fertility doctor.	Netflix; 2017–2019
Friends from College	Felix Forzenheim	Billy Eichner	Max and Felix are a gay couple. Max is a literary agent, while Felix is a fertility doctor.	Netflix; 2017–2019
Fuller House	Casey	Ben J. Pierce	Casey is gay. He and Ramona go to the school prom together as friends. First openly gay character in series.	Netflix; 2016–2020
Ghosts	The Captain	Ben Willbond	The Captain is a gay WWII officer who haunts Button House.	BBC One; 2019
The Girl's Guide to Depravity	Tyler	Joe Komara	Tyler is gay and the wise-cracking bartender at the club frequented by several of the other characters.	Cinemax; 2012–2013
GLOW	Arthie Premkumar	Sunita Mani	Arthie may be lesbian or bisexual. Yolanda is a lesbian. In season 2, it's revealed that Florian is gay and dies from an AIDS illness. Arthie and Yolanda are roommates that fall for each other.	Netflix; 2017–2020
GLOW	Yolanda	Shakira Barrera	Arthie may be lesbian or bisexual. Yolanda is a lesbian. In season 2, it's revealed that Florian is gay and dies from an AIDS illness. Arthie and Yolanda are roommates that fall for each other.	Netflix; 2017–2020
GLOW	Florian	Alex Rich	Arthie may be lesbian or bisexual. Yolanda is a lesbian. In season 2, it's revealed that Florian is gay and dies from an AIDS illness. Arthie and Yolanda are roommates that fall for each other.	Netflix; 2017–2020
Go On	Anne	Julie White	Anne is a member of the show's central support group, a lesbian mother whose wife recently died.	NBC; 2012–2013
Good Luck Charlie	Susan	Desi Lydic	Susan and Cheryl are a lesbian couple, revealed in the fourth season episode "Down a Tree", when Amy and Bob arrange a play-date with one of Charlie's friends. They are the first openly gay couple to be featured on the Disney Channel.	Disney Channel; 2010–2014
Good Luck Charlie	Cheryl	Lilli Birdsell	Susan and Cheryl are a lesbian couple, revealed in the fourth season episode "Down a Tree", when Amy and Bob arrange a play-date with one of Charlie's friends. They are the first openly gay couple to be featured on the Disney Channel.	Disney Channel; 2010–2014
The Good Place	Eleanor Shellstrop	Kristen Bell	Eleanor is bisexual. She has exhibited attraction to male and female characters, including Chidi Anagonye, Tahani Al-Jamil, and Janet.	NBC; 2016–2020
The Good Place	John Wheaton	Brandon Scott Jones	John is a bitchy gay gossip columnist who frequently mocked Tahani on his blog.	NBC; 2016–2020
Grandfathered	Annelise	Kelly Jenrette	Annelise is Jimmy's (John Stamos) assistant and right-hand woman who is openly a lesbian.	FOX; 2015
Grandma's House	Simon	Simon Amstell	Simon is a fictionalized version of gay comedian and TV host Simon Amstell. Over the course of the series he develops a relationship with actor Ben Theodore.	BBC Two; 2010–2012
Grandma's House	Ben Theodore	Iwan Rheon	Simon is a fictionalized version of gay comedian and TV host Simon Amstell. Over the course of the series he develops a relationship with actor Ben Theodore.	BBC Two; 2010–2012
The Great Indoors	Mason	Shaun Brown	Mason is bisexual.	CBS; 2016–2017
Grown-ish	Nomi Segal	Emily Arlook	Nomi is bisexual, but not out to her family. Dave is bisexual.	Freeform; 2018–2024
Grown-ish	Big Dave	Barrett Carnahan	Nomi is bisexual, but not out to her family. Dave is bisexual.	Freeform; 2018–2024
Happily Divorced	Peter Lovett	John Michael Higgins	Peter, a realtor, comes out to his wife Fran (Fran Drescher) after 18 years of marriage. The series is based on the real story of Drescher and her ex-husband, Peter Marc Jacobson.	TV Land; 2011–2013
Happy Endings	Max Blum	Adam Pally	Max, a bearish slacker who constantly schemes ridiculous ideas to take advantage of his tendency toward laziness, is one of the show's central characters.	ABC; 2011–2013
Happy Endings	Derrick	Stephen Guarino	Derrick, a recurring character, is a friend of Max from the gym. He marries his boyfriend Eric at the end of season two.	ABC; 2011–2013
Happy Endings	Jane Kerkovich-Williams	Eliza Coupe	Jane is bisexual. In season 3, her husband found out that she was in love with several women during college.	ABC; 2011–2013
Happy Endings	Grant	James Wolk	Grant is Max's former boyfriend who comes back into his life in season two when he shows up in Max's limo on Valentine's Day.	ABC; 2011–2013
Hart of Dixie	Crickett Watts	Brandi Burkhardt	In season 4, Crickett comes out just as she was about to renew vows with Stanley Watts. After this she started dating Jaysene.	The CW; 2011–2015
The Hard Times of RJ Berger	Max Owens	Jayson Blair	RJ (Paul Iacono) discovers Max is secretly gay when he sees him making out in the high school locker room showers with Guillermo in the season 2 episode "Steamy Surprise".	MTV; 2010–2011
Hot in Cleveland	Caroline Moretti	Laura San Giacomo	Caroline is Melanie's (Valerie Bertinelli) lesbian sister.	TV Land; 2010–2015
House Husbands	Kane	Gyton Grantley	Kane is gay and a stay at home dad. Tom is his partner and a firefighter. Tom is written off the show after season two. Kane then gets together with Alex who he marries. Kane and Tom mark the first time that an Australian drama has featured a gay couple raising a child.	Nine Network; 2012–2017
House Husbands	Tom	Tim Campbell	Kane is gay and a stay at home dad. Tom is his partner and a firefighter. Tom is written off the show after season two. Kane then gets together with Alex who he marries. Kane and Tom mark the first time that an Australian drama has featured a gay couple raising a child.	Nine Network; 2012–2017
House Husbands	Alex	Darren McMullen	Kane is gay and a stay at home dad. Tom is his partner and a firefighter. Tom is written off the show after season two. Kane then gets together with Alex who he marries. Kane and Tom mark the first time that an Australian drama has featured a gay couple raising a child.	Nine Network; 2012–2017
House Husbands	Eve	Justine Clarke	Eve is a lesbian and a rival to Kane's catering business.	Nine Network; 2012–2017
House Husbands	Heather Looby	Louise Siversen	Heather is a lesbian and when she's off duty, is the principal of fictional Nepean South.	Nine Network; 2012–2017
House of Lies	Roscoe Kaan	Donis Leonard, Jr.	Roscoe is the son of lead character Marty Kaan (Don Cheadle). He is into cross-dressing, and has expressed interest in both boys and girls.	Showtime; 2012–2016
Ima ve'abaz (Mom and Dads)	Erez	Yehuda Levi	Erez and Sammy are an Israeli gay couple raising a child with their best friend Talia (Maya Dagan).	HOT 3; 2012–
Ima ve'abaz (Mom and Dads)	Sammy	Yiftach Klein	Erez and Sammy are an Israeli gay couple raising a child with their best friend Talia (Maya Dagan).	HOT 3; 2012–
Imposters	Maddie Saffron	Inbar Lavi	Maddie is a bisexual con-artist who can seduce both men and women. She is Jule's ex-wife. Jules is a lesbian and was conned by Maddie.	Bravo; 2017–2018
Imposters	"Jules" Langmore	Marianne Rendón	Maddie is a bisexual con-artist who can seduce both men and women. She is Jule's ex-wife. Jules is a lesbian and was conned by Maddie.	Bravo; 2017–2018
Jann	Jann	Jann Arden	Jann is bisexual and, among several turmoils, coping with the end of her relationship with Cynthia. Cynthia is lesbian.	CTV; 2019–2021
Jann	Cynthia	Sharon Taylor	Jann is bisexual and, among several turmoils, coping with the end of her relationship with Cynthia. Cynthia is lesbian.	CTV; 2019–2021
Kidding	Scott Perera	Bernard White	Scott is a closeted gay. He and Rex had a secret affair.	Showtime; 2018–2020
Kidding	Rex Farpopolis	Andrew Tinpo Lee	Scott is a closeted gay. He and Rex had a secret affair.	Showtime; 2018–2020
Kim's Convenience	Enrique	Rodrigo Fernandez-Stoll	Enrique is gay.	CBC Television; 2016–2021
Kim's Convenience	Janet	Andrea Bang	Janet is bisexual.	CBC Television; 2016–2021
LA to Vegas	Bernard	Nathan Lee Graham	Bernard is gay.	Fox; 2018
The Last Man on Earth	Erica Dundee	Cleopatra Coleman	Erica and Gail become traveling buddies and admit to having 'experimented' with homosexuality.	Fox; 2015-2018
The Last Man on Earth	Gail Klosterman	Mary Steenburgen	Erica and Gail become traveling buddies and admit to having 'experimented' with homosexuality.	Fox; 2015-2018
Letterkenny	Dax	Gregory Waters	Ron and Dax are two openly gay gym rats who constantly make advances towards Reilly and Jonesy. They marry each other in a marriage of convenience but continue to sleep around.	Crave; 2016–2023
Letterkenny	Ron	James Daly	Ron and Dax are two openly gay gym rats who constantly make advances towards Reilly and Jonesy. They marry each other in a marriage of convenience but continue to sleep around.	Crave; 2016–2023
Letterkenny	Glen	Jacob Tierney	Glen is a closeted pastor. His homosexuality is alluded to in many double entendre-laden comments, but never directly referred to.	Crave; 2016–2023
Letterkenny	Katy	Michelle Mylett	Katy is bisexual and has had many partners, including Mrs. McMurray and Bonnie McMurray.	Crave; 2016–2023
Letterkenny	Bonnie McMurray	Kamilla Kowal	Bonnie is bisexual.	Crave; 2016–2023
Letterkenny	Mrs. McMurray	Melanie Scrofano	Mrs. McMurray is bisexual. She and her husband are swingers and often describe their sexual adventures with other women.	Crave; 2016–2023
Letterkenny	Roald	Evan Stern	Roald is openly gay. He has an unspoken crush on Stewart.	Crave; 2016–2023
Letterkenny	Tanis	Kaniehtiio Horn	Tanis is bisexual.	Crave; 2016–2023
Loudermilk	Claire	Anja Savcic	Claire is lesbian.	Audience; 2017–2020
Malibu Country	Geoffrey	Jai Rodriguez	Geoffrey is openly gay and the gatekeeper assistant to a music industry executive.	ABC; 2012–2013
Marry Me	Kevin	Dan Bucatinsky	Kevin and Kevin are a gay couple, with a daughter Annie.	NBC; 2014–2015
Marry Me	Kevin	Tim Meadows	Kevin and Kevin are a gay couple, with a daughter Annie.	NBC; 2014–2015
The McCarthys	Ronny McCarthy	Tyler Ritter	Ronny is openly gay and an assistant high school basketball coach.	CBS; 2014–2015
Merry Happy Whatever	Kayla Quinn	Ashley Tisdale	After twice breaking up with Alan, Kayla thinks she may be lesbian.	Netflix; 2019
Metro Sexual	Dr. Steph Huddleston	Geraldine Hickey	Steph is lesbian. Langdon is gay.	9Go! 9Now; 2019–
Metro Sexual	Dr. Langdon Marsh	Riley Nottingham	Steph is lesbian. Langdon is gay.	9Go! 9Now; 2019–
The Mick	Barry	Jason Kravits	Barry is secretly gay. He is the family's financial adviser. A blackmail scheme against Barry backfires after the family learns he is not married, but rather living with his sister, who they assumed was his wife. In episode "The Hotel".	Fox; 2017-2018
The Mick	Rita Pemberton	Judith Roberts	Rita Pemberton is a lesbian, and 100 years old. She tries to seduce Mickey, when the kids go to their great-grandmother's 100th birthday party. In episode "The Matriarch".	Fox; 2017-2018
Mom	Bonnie Plunkett	Allison Janney	Bonnie is bisexual and was a drug using alcoholic as a teenager.	CBS; 2013–2021
Mrs. Brown's Boys	Rory Brown	Rory Cowan	Rory and Dino are a gay couple. Actor Rory Cowan is openly gay.	RTÉ One; 2011–
Mrs. Brown's Boys	Dino Doyle	Gary Hollywood	Rory and Dino are a gay couple. Actor Rory Cowan is openly gay.	RTÉ One; 2011–
Mrs. Fletcher	Margo	Jen Richards	Margo is a trans woman.	HBO; 2019
Mrs. Fletcher	Eve Fletcher	Kathryn Hahn	Eve Fletcher is bisexual.	HBO; 2019
Murphy Brown	Pat Patel	Nik Dodani	Pat is openly gay.	CBS; 2018
Mystery Girls	Nick Diaz	Miguel Pinzon	Nick is the perky gay assistant to two detectives. Miguel Pinzon, who plays the character is openly gay as well.	ABC Family; 2014
The New Normal	David Sawyer	Justin Bartha	David and Bryan are a gay couple who have hired a surrogate mother.	NBC; 2012–2013
The New Normal	Bryan Collins	Andrew Rannells	David and Bryan are a gay couple who have hired a surrogate mother.	NBC; 2012–2013
No Good Nick	Jeremy Thompson	Kalama Epstein	Jeremy and Eric are gay. Jeremy and Eric are seen kissing in Part 2, and Eric helps Jeremy come out to his family.	Netflix; 2019
No Good Nick	Eric	Gus Kamp	Jeremy and Eric are gay. Jeremy and Eric are seen kissing in Part 2, and Eric helps Jeremy come out to his family.	Netflix; 2019
Now Apocalypse	Ulysses	Avan Jogia	Ulysses is bisexual. Gabriel is gay. Isaac is gay.	Starz; 2019
Now Apocalypse	Gabriel	Tyler Posey	Ulysses is bisexual. Gabriel is gay. Isaac is gay.	Starz; 2019
Now Apocalypse	Isaac	Jacob Artist	Ulysses is bisexual. Gabriel is gay. Isaac is gay.	Starz; 2019
One Big Happy	Lizzy	Elisha Cuthbert	Lizzy is a lesbian, who decides to have a baby together with her best friend Luke.	NBC; 2015
One Day at a Time	Elena Alvarez	Isabella Gómez	Elena comes out as a lesbian in the second half of the first season. Elena befriends, and eventually dates Syd, who is non-binary.	Netflix; 2017–2020
One Day at a Time	Syd	Sheridan Pierce	Elena comes out as a lesbian in the second half of the first season. Elena befriends, and eventually dates Syd, who is non-binary.	Netflix; 2017–2020
Other Space	Karen Lipinski	Bess Rous	Karen and Tina are revealed to have had a one-night stand in college.	Yahoo! Screen; 2015
Other Space	Tina Shukshin	Milana Vayntrub	Karen and Tina are revealed to have had a one-night stand in college.	Yahoo! Screen; 2015
Other Space	Stewart Lipinski	Karan Soni	Stewart mentions having had a boyfriend and is attracted to Tina's male fraternal twin in a dream.	Yahoo! Screen; 2015
The Other Two	Cary Dubek	Drew Tarver	Cary is openly gay.	Comedy Central; 2019–2023
Partners	Louis	Michael Urie	Louis is a gay architect who is business partners with his friend Charlie. Wyatt is his boyfriend, and a nurse.	CBS; 2012
Partners	Wyatt	Brandon Routh	Louis is a gay architect who is business partners with his friend Charlie. Wyatt is his boyfriend, and a nurse.	CBS; 2012
Please Like Me	Josh	Josh Thomas	Josh is openly gay and dates several men throughout the series.	ABC2; 2013–2016
Please Like Me	Ben	David Quirk	Ben is bisexual and was a one-night stand of Josh's.	ABC2; 2013–2016
Please Like Me	Geoffrey	Wade Briggs	Geoffrey was Josh's first boyfriend.	ABC2; 2013–2016
Please Like Me	Arnold	Keegan Joyce	Arnold was Josh's boyfriend through most of the series.	ABC2; 2013–2016
Queering	Harper	Sophia Grasso	Harper is lesbian. Val is Harper's mother and comes out as bisexual. Devon is lesbian.	YouTube; 2018–
Queering	Val	Susan Gallagher	Harper is lesbian. Val is Harper's mother and comes out as bisexual. Devon is lesbian.	YouTube; 2018–
Queering	Devon	Diana Oh	Harper is lesbian. Val is Harper's mother and comes out as bisexual. Devon is lesbian.	YouTube; 2018–
Raven's Home	Nikki	Juliana Joel	Nikki is trans, and Raven's assistant.	Disney Channel; 2017–2023
The Real O'Neals	Kenny O'Neal	Noah Galvin	Sixteen-year-old Kenny comes out to his Catholic family. Sean is gay and Kenny's first boyfriend.	ABC; 2016–2017
The Real O'Neals	Brett Young	Sean Grandillo	Sixteen-year-old Kenny comes out to his Catholic family. Sean is gay and Kenny's first boyfriend.	ABC; 2016–2017
Rentnercops	Victoria "Vicky" Adam	Katja Danowski	Vicky is a lesbian detective chief and head of her department. Greta is lesbian and Vicky's wife.	ARD; 2015–2024
Rentnercops	Greta Adam	Jutta Dolle	Vicky is a lesbian detective chief and head of her department. Greta is lesbian and Vicky's wife.	ARD; 2015–2024
Roadies	Donna Mancini	Keisha Castle-Hughes	Donna Mancini is a lesbian sound engineer and is trying to have a baby with her partner Lori.	Showtime; 2016
Running Wilde	Mr. Lunt	Robert Michael Morris	Mr. Lunt is gay, and the personal assistant to lead character Steve Wilde (Will Arnett).	Fox; 2010
Sally4Ever	Sally	Catherine Shepherd	Sally comes out as lesbian when she meets Emma and they get involved. Emma is a lesbian.	Sky Atlantic; HBO; 2018
Sally4Ever	Emma	Julia Davis	Sally comes out as lesbian when she meets Emma and they get involved. Emma is a lesbian.	Sky Atlantic; HBO; 2018
Schitt's Creek	David Rose	Dan Levy	David is pansexual, and married to Patrick who is gay.	CBC; Pop TV; 2015–2020
Schitt's Creek	Patrick Brewer	Noah Reid	David is pansexual, and married to Patrick who is gay.	CBC; Pop TV; 2015–2020
Schitt's Creek	Connor	Matthew Tissi	Connor is a gay high school student. Jocelyn asks David to counsel Connor whom she feels is not fitting in.	CBC; Pop TV; 2015–2020
Schitt's Creek	Jake	Steve Lund	Jake is bisexual. He was dating Stevie and David at the same time.	CBC; Pop TV; 2015–2020
Schitt's Creek	Sebastien Raine	François Arnaud	David's ex-boyfriend, who arrives in town to do a photoshoot with Moira.	CBC; Pop TV; 2015–2020
Schitt's Creek	Ronnie Lee	Karen Robinson	Ronnie is a lesbian and a member of the town council.	CBC; Pop TV; 2015–2020
Scream Queens	Sam	Jeanna Han	Sam is a lesbian.	FOX; 2015–2016
Scream Queens	Sadie Swenson / Chanel No. 3	Billie Lourd	Chanel No. 3 is a bisexual.	FOX; 2015–2016
Scream Queens	Boone Clemens	Nick Jonas	Boone is gay and a member of the Dicky Dollar Scholars.	FOX; 2015–2016
Sean Saves the World	Sean	Sean Hayes	Sean is a divorced gay father with a successful, yet demanding, career.	NBC; 2013–2014
Sex & Drugs & Rock & Roll	Gigi Rock	Elizabeth Gillies	Gigi is the lead singer of the fictional band The Assassins and Johnny's (Denis Leary) daughter. She is shacked up with a much older bandmate and is starting to explore lesbian liaisons.	FX; 2015–2016
$#*! My Dad Says	Tim	Tim Bagley	Tim is the openly gay housekeeper. Tim helped Dr. Goodson (William Shatner), cheat on his driver's license exam at the DMV in episode one. After getting fired for helping him cheat, Tim sees Dr. Goodson at a gay-themed restaurant where he now works. Dr. Goodson, feeling bad for Tim getting fired, hires him as his housekeeper.	CBS; 2010–2011
Shrill	Fran	Lolly Adefope	Fran is a lesbian and the main character's best friend. Gabe is gay and the main character's boss.	Hulu; 2019–2021
Shrill	Gabe Parrish	John Cameron Mitchell	Fran is a lesbian and the main character's best friend. Gabe is gay and the main character's boss.	Hulu; 2019–2021
Silicon Valley	Dee Dee	A.D. Miles	Dee Dee is gay, and runs a gay Christian fictional dating app called FirstSight.	HBO; 2014–2019
Sirens (2011)	Ashley Greenwick	Richard Madden	Ashley is a gay EMT.	Channel 4; 2011
Sirens (2014)	Hank St. Clare	Kevin Daniels	Hank is an openly gay EMT. The show is based on the British series of the same name.	USA Network; 2014–2015
Sirens (2014)	Valentina 'Voodoo' Dunacci	Kelly O'Sullivan	Voodoo is an asexual EMT.	USA Network; 2014–2015
Suburgatory	Mr. Wolfe	Rex Lee	Mr. Wolfe is a guidance counselor at fictional Chatswin High School. He comes out in the episode "Out in the Burbs".	ABC; 2011–2014
Superstore	Mateo	Nico Santos	Mateo and Jeff are a gay couple with complications.	NBC; 2015–2021
Superstore	Jeff	Michael Bunin	Mateo and Jeff are a gay couple with complications.	NBC; 2015–2021
Survivor's Remorse	M-Chuck Calloway	Erica Ash	M-Chuck Calloway is a lesbian and a womanizer. She is often loud-mouthed and vulgar.	Starz; 2014-2017
Survivor's Remorse	Hazel-Fay	Nicholle Tom	Hazel-Fay is a lesbian. M-Chuck started arguing with Hazel-Fay while visiting a plantation museum and the two ended up having sex in one of the museum's beds.	Starz; 2014-2017
Survivor's Remorse	Julz	Julieanna Marie Goddard	Julz is bisexual, and has a one night stand with M-Chuck.	Starz; 2014-2017
Survivor's Remorse	Janine	Anastacia McPherson	Janine is bisexual. M-Chuck's neighbor, after finding her lost dog, they have sex.	Starz; 2014-2017
Survivor's Remorse	Maura	Sandra Hinojosa	Maura is a lesbian. M-Chuck has sex with Maura, not knowing she's a sex-worker.	Starz; 2014-2017
The Switch	Sü	Nyla Rose	Trans woman played by trans actress.	OutTV; 2015–2016
Telenovela (Latin American soap opera)	Gael Garnica	Jose Moreno Brooks	Gael is gay.	NBC; 2015
The Tick	Dangerboat	Alan Tudyk (voice)	Dangerboat, Overkill's artificial intelligence watercraft, develops homosexual feelings for Arthur.	Amazon Prime Video; 2016–2019
Trial & Error	Larry Henderson	John Lithgow	Larry is bisexual, and on trial for murder.	NBC; 2017–2018
Unbreakable Kimmy Schmidt	Titus Andromedon	Tituss Burgess	Titus is gay and Kimmy's friend and roommate.	Netflix; 2015–2019
Unbreakable Kimmy Schmidt	Brandon	Brandon Jones	Brandon is the gay husband of Kimmy's friend, Cyndee.	Netflix; 2015–2019
Unbreakable Kimmy Schmidt	Mikey Politano	Mike Carlsen	Mikey is Titus's boyfriend.	Netflix; 2015–2019
Undateable	Brett	David Fynn	Brett is a gay bartender.	NBC; 2014–2016
Vicious	Freddie Thornhill	Ian McKellen	Freddie and Stuart are a gay couple in their 70's, who have lived together in a small flat for nearly 50 years. Freddie was an actor and Stuart a barman when they first met, but their careers are now pretty much over; their lives now consist of reading books, walking their dog and bickering.	ITV; 2013–2016
Vicious	Stuart Bixby	Derek Jacobi	Freddie and Stuart are a gay couple in their 70's, who have lived together in a small flat for nearly 50 years. Freddie was an actor and Stuart a barman when they first met, but their careers are now pretty much over; their lives now consist of reading books, walking their dog and bickering.	ITV; 2013–2016
Weird Loners	Zara Sandhu	Meera Rohit Kumbhani	Zara is bisexual and an angsty artist.	FOX; 2015
Wet Hot American Summer: First Day of Camp	Ben	Bradley Cooper	Ben and Susie are known by everyone to be an item, except Ben is gay and in a secret relationship with gay counselor McKinley.	Netflix; 2015
Wet Hot American Summer: First Day of Camp	McKinley Dozen	Michael Ian Black	Ben and Susie are known by everyone to be an item, except Ben is gay and in a secret relationship with gay counselor McKinley.	Netflix; 2015
What We Do in the Shadows	Nadja	Natasia Demetriou	Nadja is a bisexual vampire. Laszlo is bisexual. He is an English nobleman turned into a vampire by Nadja and is now married to her. Nandor is a bisexual 757-year-old vampire.	FX; 2019–2024
What We Do in the Shadows	Laszlo Cravensworth	Matt Berry	Nadja is a bisexual vampire. Laszlo is bisexual. He is an English nobleman turned into a vampire by Nadja and is now married to her. Nandor is a bisexual 757-year-old vampire.	FX; 2019–2024
What We Do in the Shadows	Nandor	Kayvan Novak	Nadja is a bisexual vampire. Laszlo is bisexual. He is an English nobleman turned into a vampire by Nadja and is now married to her. Nandor is a bisexual 757-year-old vampire.	FX; 2019–2024
What We Do in the Shadows	Guillermo de la Cruz	Harvey Guillén	Guillermo comes out as gay to his family in season four, episode seven ("Pine Barrens").	
Whitney	Neal	Maulik Pancholy	Neal comes out as gay after his friends catch him on a date with a man.	NBC; 2012–2013
Work in Progress	Abby	Abby McEnany	Abby is lesbian and describes herself as a "fat, queer dyke". Chris is a trans man.	Showtime; 2019–2021
Work in Progress	Chris	Theo Germaine	Abby is lesbian and describes herself as a "fat, queer dyke". Chris is a trans man.	Showtime; 2019–2021
Work in Progress	Campbell	Celeste Pechous	Campbell is Abby's best friend and lesbian.	Showtime; 2019–2021
Yonderland	Elder Ho-Tan	Laurence Rickard/Clare Thomson (briefly in S2E8)	Ho-Tan is a trans woman who is the scribe of the Council of Elders.	Sky One; 2013–2016
Yonderland	Younger Ho-Tan	Perdita Hibbins	Ho-Tan's son, who we are initially led to believe is female, declares himself to be a boy, mirroring how his mother is a trans woman.	Sky One; 2013–2016
You Me Her	Isabelle "Izzy" Silva	Priscilla Faia	Izzy is bisexual and turned the Jack and Emma couple into a throuple.	Audience Network; 2016–2020
You Me Her	Emma Trakarsky	Rachel Blanchard	Emma is bisexual and admitted to having a few romantic and sexual relationships with women in the past.	Audience Network; 2016–2020
Zoe Ever After	Valente	Tory Devon Smith	Valente is gay, and works at an up-and-coming cosmetics business.	BET; 2016
The Righteous Gemstones	Kelvin Gemstone	Adam DeVine	Kelvin and Keefe are gay and in a relationship.	HBO; 2019–25
The Righteous Gemstones	Keefe Chambers	Tony Cavalero	Kelvin and Keefe are gay and in a relationship.	HBO; 2019–25

== 2020s ==
Show	Character	Actor	Notes	Network Series run
Abbott Elementary	Jacob Hill	Chris Perfetti	Jacob is a sixth grade history teacher at Abbot Elementary. In the episode titled "Work Family", Jacob reveals he has been dating his boyfriend Zach for 2 years.	ABC; 2021–
Abbott Elementary	Zach	Larry Owens	Jacob is a sixth grade history teacher at Abbot Elementary. In the episode titled "Work Family", Jacob reveals he has been dating his boyfriend Zach for 2 years.	ABC; 2021–
Avenue 5	Ryan Clark	Hugh Laurie	Clark has a husband and a wife, indicating he is bisexual.	HBO; 2020–2022
Baby Reindeer	Donny Dunn	Richard Gadd	Teri is a transgender American therapist Donny meets on a dating site, who helps him confront his bisexuality.	Netflix; 2024
Baby Reindeer	Teresa "Teri"	Nava Mau	Teri is a transgender American therapist Donny meets on a dating site, who helps him confront his bisexuality.	Netflix; 2024
Big Shot	Carolyn "Mouse" Smith	Tisha Eve Custodio	Mouse has a massive crush on Harper, a female journalist at the school.	Disney+ 2021–2022
Boy Luck Club	JJ Lai	Kit DeZolt	JJ is a yoga instructor who gets together with his five 'gaysian' best friends every Friday night for cocktails via online chats to offer support to help each other navigate life under quarantine.	AsianAmericanMovies.com; 2020–
Boy Luck Club	Julian Tran	David Vi Hoang	JJ is a yoga instructor who gets together with his five 'gaysian' best friends every Friday night for cocktails via online chats to offer support to help each other navigate life under quarantine.	AsianAmericanMovies.com; 2020–
Boy Luck Club	Otis Wu	Eric Cheng	JJ is a yoga instructor who gets together with his five 'gaysian' best friends every Friday night for cocktails via online chats to offer support to help each other navigate life under quarantine.	AsianAmericanMovies.com; 2020–
Boy Luck Club	Aiden Wong	Stanson Chung	JJ is a yoga instructor who gets together with his five 'gaysian' best friends every Friday night for cocktails via online chats to offer support to help each other navigate life under quarantine.	AsianAmericanMovies.com; 2020–
Boy Luck Club	Ronald Cruz	Justin Madriaga	JJ is a yoga instructor who gets together with his five 'gaysian' best friends every Friday night for cocktails via online chats to offer support to help each other navigate life under quarantine.	AsianAmericanMovies.com; 2020–
Boy Luck Club	Felix Costa	Xavier Durante	JJ is a yoga instructor who gets together with his five 'gaysian' best friends every Friday night for cocktails via online chats to offer support to help each other navigate life under quarantine.	AsianAmericanMovies.com; 2020–
Danger Force	Dustan	Brandon Claybon	Dustan and Justin are a gay couple raising their adoptive child Ellis. When Ellis gets lost, the Danger Force rescues him and reunites him with his dads.	Nickelodeon; 2020–2024
Danger Force	Justin	Tommy Dickie	Dustan and Justin are a gay couple raising their adoptive child Ellis. When Ellis gets lost, the Danger Force rescues him and reunites him with his dads.	Nickelodeon; 2020–2024
Diary of a Future President	Camila	Jessica Marie Garcia	Camila is lesbian. She has a girlfriend, but is apprehensive about coming out to her parents.	Disney+ 2020–2021
Doogie Kameāloha, M.D.	Charles Zeller	Jeffrey Bowyer-Chapman	Zeller is gay. He has an ex-boyfriend.	Disney+ 2021–2023
Everything's Gonna Be Okay	Nicholas	Josh Thomas	Nicholas and Alex are a gay couple. When Nicholas' father dies, he is responsible for taking care of his teenage half-sisters, Genevieve and Matilda. Matilda, who is panromantic and heterosexual, begins a relationship with Drea, who is asexual.	Freeform; 2020–2021
Everything's Gonna Be Okay	Alex	Adam Faison	Nicholas and Alex are a gay couple. When Nicholas' father dies, he is responsible for taking care of his teenage half-sisters, Genevieve and Matilda. Matilda, who is panromantic and heterosexual, begins a relationship with Drea, who is asexual.	Freeform; 2020–2021
Everything's Gonna Be Okay	Matilda	Kayla Cromer	Nicholas and Alex are a gay couple. When Nicholas' father dies, he is responsible for taking care of his teenage half-sisters, Genevieve and Matilda. Matilda, who is panromantic and heterosexual, begins a relationship with Drea, who is asexual.	Freeform; 2020–2021
Everything's Gonna Be Okay	Drea	Lillian Carrier	Nicholas and Alex are a gay couple. When Nicholas' father dies, he is responsible for taking care of his teenage half-sisters, Genevieve and Matilda. Matilda, who is panromantic and heterosexual, begins a relationship with Drea, who is asexual.	Freeform; 2020–2021
Feel Good	Mae	Mae Martin	Mae and George are in a relationship.	Channel 4 Netflix; 2020–2021
Feel Good	George	Charlotte Ritchie	Mae and George are in a relationship.	Channel 4 Netflix; 2020–2021
Ghosts	Isaac Higgintoot	Brandon Scott Jones	Isaac is a gay Revolutionary War officer who haunts Woodstone Manor.	CBS; 2021-
High Fidelity	Robyn "Rob" Brooks	Zoë Kravitz	Rob is bisexual, and works at the record store she owns. The series is based on Nick Hornby's novel High Fidelity and the film.	Hulu; 2020
High Fidelity	Simon Miller	David H. Holmes	Simon and Blake are a gay couple. Simon works at the record store, while Blake is a bartender. The series was canceled after one season.	Hulu; 2020
High Fidelity	Blake	Edmund Donovan	Simon and Blake are a gay couple. Simon works at the record store, while Blake is a bartender. The series was canceled after one season.	Hulu; 2020
Hacks	Beth	Blair Beeken	Beth and Winnie are ex-wives. Ava, who is bisexual, is one of the show's leads, and Ruby is her ex-girlfriend. She also dates a couple, Emily and Dev. Marcus, Deborah's closest advisor, dates Wilson, a water inspector.	HBO Max (seasons 1–2); Max (season 3–present); 2021–2026
Hacks	Winnie Landell	Helen Hunt	Beth and Winnie are ex-wives. Ava, who is bisexual, is one of the show's leads, and Ruby is her ex-girlfriend. She also dates a couple, Emily and Dev. Marcus, Deborah's closest advisor, dates Wilson, a water inspector.	HBO Max (seasons 1–2); Max (season 3–present); 2021–2026
Hacks	Ava Daniels	Hannah Einbinder	Beth and Winnie are ex-wives. Ava, who is bisexual, is one of the show's leads, and Ruby is her ex-girlfriend. She also dates a couple, Emily and Dev. Marcus, Deborah's closest advisor, dates Wilson, a water inspector.	HBO Max (seasons 1–2); Max (season 3–present); 2021–2026
Hacks	Ruby	Lorenza Izzo	Beth and Winnie are ex-wives. Ava, who is bisexual, is one of the show's leads, and Ruby is her ex-girlfriend. She also dates a couple, Emily and Dev. Marcus, Deborah's closest advisor, dates Wilson, a water inspector.	HBO Max (seasons 1–2); Max (season 3–present); 2021–2026
Hacks	Emily	Medalion Rahimi	Beth and Winnie are ex-wives. Ava, who is bisexual, is one of the show's leads, and Ruby is her ex-girlfriend. She also dates a couple, Emily and Dev. Marcus, Deborah's closest advisor, dates Wilson, a water inspector.	HBO Max (seasons 1–2); Max (season 3–present); 2021–2026
Hacks	Marcus	Carl Clemons-Hopkins	Beth and Winnie are ex-wives. Ava, who is bisexual, is one of the show's leads, and Ruby is her ex-girlfriend. She also dates a couple, Emily and Dev. Marcus, Deborah's closest advisor, dates Wilson, a water inspector.	HBO Max (seasons 1–2); Max (season 3–present); 2021–2026
Hacks	Wilson	Johnny Sibilly	Beth and Winnie are ex-wives. Ava, who is bisexual, is one of the show's leads, and Ruby is her ex-girlfriend. She also dates a couple, Emily and Dev. Marcus, Deborah's closest advisor, dates Wilson, a water inspector.	HBO Max (seasons 1–2); Max (season 3–present); 2021–2026
Home Economics	Sarah Hayworth	Caitlin McGee	Sarah and Denise are a lesbian couple. They are married with two kids. Sarah is unemployed, while Denise is a school teacher.	ABC; 2021–2023
Home Economics	Denise	Sasheer Zamata	Sarah and Denise are a lesbian couple. They are married with two kids. Sarah is unemployed, while Denise is a school teacher.	ABC; 2021–2023
Indebted	Joanna	Jessy Hodges	Joanna is lesbian.	NBC; 2020
Julie and the Phantoms	Alex Mercer	Owen Joyner	Alex is a gay ghost, and the drummer for the fictional band Julie and the Phantoms. He falls in love with another gay ghost named Willie, an avid skateboarder.	Netflix; 2020
Julie and the Phantoms	Willie	Booboo Stewart	Alex is a gay ghost, and the drummer for the fictional band Julie and the Phantoms. He falls in love with another gay ghost named Willie, an avid skateboarder.	Netflix; 2020
Kaos	Atropos	Sam Buttery	Atropos, Clotho and Lachesis are Fates, three trans, non-binary immortal Gods of desire.	Netflix; 2024
Kaos	Clotho	Ché	Atropos, Clotho and Lachesis are Fates, three trans, non-binary immortal Gods of desire.	Netflix; 2024
Kaos	Lachesis	Suzy Eddie Izzard	Atropos, Clotho and Lachesis are Fates, three trans, non-binary immortal Gods of desire.	Netflix; 2024
Mr. Mayor	Susan Krap	Natalie Morales	Susan Krap is a lesbian.	NBC; 2021–2022
Mythic Quest	Rachel Meyee	Ashly Burch	Rachel and Dana are in a romantic relationship.	Apple TV+ 2020–2025
Mythic Quest	Dana Bryant	Imani Hakim	Rachel and Dana are in a romantic relationship.	Apple TV+ 2020–2025
Only Murders in the Building	Alice Banks	Cara Delevingne	Mabel and Alice are in a romantic relationship.	Hulu; 2021–
Only Murders in the Building	Mabel Mora	Selena Gomez	Mabel and Alice are in a romantic relationship.	Hulu; 2021–
Only Murders in the Building	Detective Williams	Da'Vine Joy Randolph	Williams is married to another woman, and they raise a child.	Hulu; 2021–
Only Murders in the Building	Howard Morris	Michael Cyril Creighton	Howard is gay.	Hulu; 2021–
Only Murders in the Building	Jan Bellows	Amy Ryan	Jan dates Charles' stunt double Sazz.	Hulu; 2021–
Only Murders in the Building	Sazz Pataki	Jane Lynch	Jan dates Charles' stunt double Sazz.	Hulu; 2021–
Our Flag Means Death	Edward "Blackbeard" Teach	Taika Waititi	Ed & Stede's relationship is confirmed to be romantic in 1x09.	HBO Max; 2022–2024
Our Flag Means Death	Stede Bonnet	Rhys Darby	Ed & Stede's relationship is confirmed to be romantic in 1x09.	HBO Max; 2022–2024
Our Flag Means Death	Lucius	Nathan Foad	Lucius is openly gay and is in a sexual and romantic relationship with Black Pete.	HBO Max; 2022–2024
Our Flag Means Death	Black Pete	Matthew Maher	Lucius is openly gay and is in a sexual and romantic relationship with Black Pete.	HBO Max; 2022–2024
Our Flag Means Death	Bonifacia Jimenez/Jim	Vico Ortiz	Bonifacia/Jim is a non-binary character who goes by the alias 'Jim' while hiding aboard Bonnet's ship. After removing the male disguise, Jim begins using they/them pronouns.	HBO Max; 2022–2024
Pivoting	Sarah	Maggie Q	Sarah is bisexual.	Fox; 2022
Run the Burbs	Khia Pham	Zoriah Wong	Khia is queer. She has a crush on Mannix (Simone Miller).	CBC Television; 2022-2024
Saved by the Bell	Lexi Haddad-DeFabrizio	Josie Totah	Lexi is a trans woman, and Queen bee of the school.	Peacock; 2020–2021
Shrinking	Brian	Michael Urie	Brian is happily dating and later married to Charlie, another LGBTQIA+ male.	Apple TV+ 2023–present
Shrinking	Charlie	Devin Kawaoka	Brian is happily dating and later married to Charlie, another LGBTQIA+ male.	Apple TV+ 2023–present
Space Force	Dr. Adrian Mallory	John Malkovich	Dr. Mallory is gay and Space Force's chief scientist. He is frequently frustrated by the ineptitude of everyone surrounding him.	Netflix; 2020–2022
Ted	Blaire Bennett	Giorgia Whigham	John's cousin Blaire and her friend Sarah are dating.	Peacock; 2024–present
Ted	Sarah	Marissa Shankar	John's cousin Blaire and her friend Sarah are dating.	Peacock; 2024–present
Ted Lasso	Colin Hughes	Billy Harris	Colin Hughes is a footballer for AFC Richmond, who comes out during the third season, firstly doing so to Trent Crimm, a journalist who similarly discusses their sexuality.	Apple TV; 2020–present
Ted Lasso	Trent Crimm	James Lance	Colin Hughes is a footballer for AFC Richmond, who comes out during the third season, firstly doing so to Trent Crimm, a journalist who similarly discusses their sexuality.	Apple TV; 2020–present
Ted Lasso	Keeley Jones	Juno Temple	Keeley is bi, as hinted in the first two seasons and later confirmed in season 3.	
Twenties	Hattie	Jonica "Jojo" T. Gibbs	Hattie is a queer aspiring screenwriter, living in Los Angeles.	BET; 2020–2021
YYY	Nott	Yoon Phusanu	YYY is a Thai boys' love comedy series, about boys living in the same apartment together. Nott and Pun are gay love interests.	Line TV; 2020–
YYY	Pun	Lay Talay	YYY is a Thai boys' love comedy series, about boys living in the same apartment together. Nott and Pun are gay love interests.	Line TV; 2020–
YYY	Porpla	Poppy Ratchapong	Porpla is a trans woman, and one of the roommates.	Line TV; 2020–
Uncoupled	Michael Lawson	Neil Patrick Harris	Michael is a newly single gay man in New York.	Netflix; Showtime; 2022
Uncoupled	Colin McKenna	Tuc Watkins	Colin is Michael's former partner of 17 years.	Netflix; Showtime; 2022
Uncoupled	Billy	Emerson Brooks	Billy and Stanley are gay friends of Michael.	Netflix; Showtime; 2022
Uncoupled	Stanley	Brooks Ashmanskas	Billy and Stanley are gay friends of Michael.	Netflix; Showtime; 2022
Zoey's Extraordinary Playlist	Mo	Alex Newell	Mo is Zoey's gay, gender non-conforming neighbor and DJ who tries to help her understand the extent of her power.	NBC; 2020–2021
Zoey's Extraordinary Playlist	Eddie	Patrick Ortiz	Eddie is gay and Mo's love interest.	NBC; 2020–2021

== See also ==
- List of dramatic television series with LGBT characters: 1960s–2000s
- List of dramatic television series with LGBT characters: 2010–2015
- List of dramatic television series with LGBT characters: 2016–2019
- List of dramatic television series with LGBT characters: 2020s
- List of lesbian characters in television
- List of gay characters in television
- List of bisexual characters in television
- List of transgender characters in television
- List of fictional asexual characters
- List of fictional intersex characters
- List of fictional non-binary characters
- List of fictional pansexual characters
- List of animated series with LGBT characters
- List of comedy drama television series
- List of comedy and variety television programs with LGBT cast members
- List of horror television series with LGBT characters
- List of made-for-television films with LGBT characters
- List of reality television programs with LGBT cast members
- List of LGBT characters in soap operas
- List of LGBT characters in radio and podcasts
- Lists of LGBT figures in fiction and myth
- LGBTQ themes in Western animation
- LGBTQ themes in anime and manga

== Book Sources ==
- Becker, Ron (2006). Gay TV and Straight America. New Brunswick, New Jersey: Rutgers University Press. ISBN 978-0813536880.
- Capsuto, Steven (2000). Alternate Channels: The Uncensored Story of Gay and Lesbian Images on Radio and Television. New York: Ballantine Books. ISBN 0-345-41243-5. LCCN 00104495. OCLC 44596808.
- Cortese, Anthony Joseph Paul (2006). Opposing Hate Speech. Foreword by Richard Delgado. Praeger Publishers. ISBN 0-275-98427-3. LCCN 2005019176. OCLC 849085841.
- Danuta Walters, Suzanna (2001). All The Rage: The Story Of Gay Visibility In America. University of Chicago Press. ISBN 0-226-87231-9. LCCN 2001001665. OCLC 46500686.
- Tropiano, Stephen (2002). The Prime Time Closet: A History of Gays and Lesbians on TV. New York: Applause Theatre & Cinema Books. ISBN 1-55783-557-8. LCCN 2002003220. OCLC 606827696.
