= Stressed Eric =

Animated sitcom (1998-2000)

- Genre: Adult animation Animated sitcom Black comedy
- Created by: Carl Gorham
- Written by: Carl Gorham; Michael Hatt
- Voices of: Mark Heap (original version); Hank Azaria (American version); Morwenna Banks; Rebecca Front; Gordon Kennedy; Doon Mackichan; Geoffrey McGivern; Paul Shearer; Alison Steadman; Alexander Armstrong
- Composers: Peter Baikie; Jason McDermid; Mat Clark (series 1)
- Countries of origin: United Kingdom; United States (series 1); Hungary (series 2)
- Original language: English
- No. of series: 2
- No. of episodes: 13

Production
- Executive producers: Miles Bullough; Claire Jennings; Arlene Klasky (series 1); Gábor Csupó (series 1)
- Producers: Mitch Watson (series 1); Carl Gorham (series 2); Hank Azaria (American version)
- Editors: John Bryant (series 1); Steve Hughes (series 2)
- Running time: 30 minutes
- Production company: Absolutely Productions (Note: Animation production by Klasky Csupo (series 1) and Varga Studio (series 2).)

Original release
- Network: BBC Two; NBC (United States, series 1 only)
- Release: 20 April 1998 – 11 October 2000

Stressed Eric is an adult animated sitcom that was produced by Absolutely Productions for the BBC Two television channel in the United Kingdom and Television New Zealand. The series revolves around Eric Feeble, a middle class man who is always stressed because of his family, work, co-workers, etc. The show ran for two series in the UK, while its redubbed American version only covers the first series.

== Overview ==
Eric Feeble is still upset over his divorce two years before. He lives in a middle-class London house and is always kept under extreme amounts of pressure and stress from all aspects of life, which is represented by a throbbing vein in his temple. His two children, Brian and Claire, plague him with fear and worry daily. Claire is a frail 6-year-old who is allergic to virtually everything, including wheat, ponies, and spices; 10-year-old Brian has learning problems and has been kept back three straight years in school, and has an oral fixation and pica. The family's au pair housekeeper, Maria, is a Portuguese woman with a serious drinking problem; despite Eric's frequent attempts to keep her under control and focused, she stays passed-out drunk for hours at a time. His former wife Liz left him for a Buddhist but phones him up incessantly, which adds to his stress level. The next-door neighbours, the wealthy, successful, snobbish Perfect family, provide a constant and painful view of what his life could have been.

Eric's workplace is absolutely no escape from his everyday problems. His boss, Paul Power (known as PP), is loud, rude and demanding; he has demoted Eric from Assistant Manager to a low-level clerk in an office sandwiched between the janitor's closet and the men's toilets. His secretary Alison is completely useless, spending all her "working hours" in personal phone calls and shrilling rudely at Eric when he requests her attention.

At the end of almost every episode, as the climax of events cause Eric's stress to reach breaking point, the throbbing vein emerges from his temple and wraps itself around his neck, strangling and apparently killing him. It is the only fantastical element in the grounded setting of the series.

== Characters ==
=== Main ===
- Eric Feeble (Mark Heap) (Hank Azaria in American version) – Stressed out divorced father of two children. Eric is a kind, well-meaning man who loves his children. Although bitter and sarcastic about many aspects of his life, Eric genuinely tries to make the best out of situation and deeply loves his children, going to great lengths to make them proud. However, he normally fails due to no fault of his own, and the rare times he actually does well, something always happens to ruin it.
- Claire Feeble (Morwenna Banks) – Daughter of Eric; allergic to just about everything, but an intelligent, curious, playful little girl. Her allergies require her to eat special regulation food, but she is always sneaking ordinary food which immediately swells her up.
- Brian Feeble (Gábor Csupó) – Son of Eric; has been held back in school for three years straight. He has pica and as a result, is always putting strange things in his mouth.
- Maria Gonzalez (Doon Mackichan) – The Feeble family's live-in au pair; she is Portuguese and always drunk or hung over.

The broadcast of the series on NBC in the United States replaced Mark Heap's voice with that of Hank Azaria, who also serves as a producer for the dub, repurposing Eric as an American expatriate.

=== Supporting ===
- Liz (Rebecca Front) – Eric's eccentric former wife.
- Caleb (Gordon Kennedy) – Liz's boyfriend.
- Ray Perfect (Alexander Armstrong) – Snobbish and "perfect" next-door neighbour of Eric. Shares Eric's workplace, but is senior and consistently praised for his fine work.
- Sue Perfect (Alison Steadman) – Snobbish wife of Mr. Perfect. Catchphrase: "How art thou, Eric?"
- Heather Perfect (Morwenna Banks) – Snobbish daughter of Mr. and Mrs. Perfect.
- Paul Power, a.k.a. P.P. (Geoffrey McGivern) – Boss of Eric who is usually very angry. Catchphrase: "Double arseburgers, Eric!"
- Alison Scabie (Doon Mackichan) – Eric's useless secretary who spends all her time on the telephone gossiping to friends.
- Doc (Paul Shearer) – Eric's dementedly relaxed doctor, more interested in chasing women than treating Eric. He is the closest thing Eric has to a best friend.
- Mrs. Wilson (Morwenna Banks) – An old lady who slowly tries in vain to post a letter which always falls from her hand and into a drain, sometimes with Eric to blame. Catchphrase: "Morning, Mister Eric. Just off to the post..."
- Gordon Kennedy voices various characters.

== Episodes ==
=== Series 1 (1998) ===
This is the only series to broadcast in the United States.

No. overall	No. in series	Title	Directed by	Written by	Storyboard by	Original release date	Prod. code
1	1	"Nativity"	Cathy Malkasian	Carl Gorham & Michael Hatt	Cathy Malkasian, Dean Criswell, Dave Fontana & Rose Rosely	April 20, 1998	7201
2	2	"Sex"	Steve Loter	Carl Gorham & Michael Hatt	Steve Loter, Philippe Capart, Ron Borresen, Bob Taylor, Shawn Murray, Dave Fontana & Ron Brewer	April 27, 1998	7205
3	3	"Pony"	Steve Loter	Carl Gorham & Michael Hatt	Steve Loter, Declan Moran, John Mathot & Philippe Capart	May 11, 1998	7202
4	4	"Hospital"	Steve Ressel	Carl Gorham & Michael Hatt	Steve Ressel, Eduardo Olivares, Alberto Dose & Shawn Murray	May 18, 1998	7203
5	5	"Potato"	Cathy Malkasian	Gavin Rodgers, Carl Gorham & Michael Hatt	Cathy Malkasian, Dean Criswell, Dave Fontana, Rose Rosely & Ron Brewer	June 1, 1998	7204
6	6	"Tidy"	Steve Ressel	Carl Gorham & Michael Hatt	Steve Ressel, Eduardo Olivares, Alberto Dose, Shawn Murray, Ron Brewer & Dave Fontana	June 8, 1998	7206

=== Series 2 (2000) ===
No. overall	No. in series	Title	Directed by	Storyboard by	Original release date	Prod. code
7	1	"Cricket"	Kim Burdon	Anna Brocket, Andy Eracleous, Stuart Evans, Alan Green, Norm Konyu, Dave Burns, Michael Douglas, Helga Egilson, Rachel Glodowski & Julian Henshaw	August 31, 2000	201
8	2	"Bursting"	Roger Mainwood	Anna Brocket, Andy Eracleous, Stuart Evans, Alan Green, Norm Konyu, Dave Burns, Michael Douglas, Helga Egilson, Rachel Glodowski & Julian Henshaw	September 6, 2000	202
9	3	"Team"	Roger Mainwood	Anna Brocket, Andy Eracleous, Stuart Evans, Alan Green, Norm Konyu, Dave Burns, Michael Douglas, Helga Egilson, Rachel Glodowski & Julian Henshaw	September 13, 2000	203
10	4	"Tent"	Pete Western	Anna Brocket, Andy Eracleous, Stuart Evans, Alan Green, Norm Konyu, Dave Burns, Michael Douglas, Helga Egilson, Rachel Glodowski & Julian Henshaw	September 20, 2000	204
11	5	"Crush"	Pete Western	Anna Brocket, Andy Eracleous, Stuart Evans, Alan Green, Norm Konyu, Dave Burns, Michael Douglas, Helga Egilson, Rachel Glodowski & Julian Henshaw	September 27, 2000	205
12 (Broadcast) 13 (Production)	6 (Broadcast) 7 (Production)	"Au Pair"	Kim Burdon	Anna Brocket, Andy Eracleous, Stuart Evans, Alan Green, Norm Konyu, Dave Burns, Michael Douglas, Helga Egilson, Rachel Glodowski & Julian Henshaw	October 4, 2000	207
13 (Broadcast) 12 (Production)	7 (Broadcast) 6 (Production)	"Drool"	Pete Western & Roger Mainwood	Anna Brocket, Andy Eracleous, Stuart Evans, Alan Green, Norm Konyu, Dave Burns, Michael Douglas, Helga Egilson, Rachel Glodowski & Julian Henshaw	October 11, 2000	206

== Broadcast and production ==
The show was first broadcast on BBC2 in April 1998 and ran for two series. While BBC Worldwide was heavily involved in the production, international sales for the series were handled by ITEL.

ITEL pre-sold North American rights to the series to NBC in July 1998, most likely owing to Season 1 being animated by Klasky Csupo in Los Angeles. These airings were adapted for American audiences with the lead character's voice redubbed and re-worked as an American expatriate with several original lines changed for cultural purposes, a new opening sequence that reflects the changed storyline and some scenes cut for time constraints. Only three episodes were aired by NBC until the show was pulled from the network following low ratings.

Stressed Eric continued when Hibbert Ralph produced the second series. The second series was animated by Varga Studio instead. In Canada, it aired on kids Canadian channel YTV (during the adult oriented "Limbo" block) with the original UK dub. It also aired reruns on BBC Choice until 2003 when said network became BBC Three.

== Reception ==
In a positive view, Variety noted that the lead character "is so unfathomably pathetic that he makes Homer Simpson look like Bill Gates" and was critical of the decision to redub the series in American English for the first series, but stated that the series was otherwise "wry and smart".

Charles Solomon of the Los Angeles Times said that the series "seems to be trying to out-do South Park for sheer tastelessness in an animated series" and that Azaria "may be able to make Eric likable, but it's going to be an uphill battle" since "the characters on Stressed Eric [...] come across as alienated, crass and nasty".

Tom Shales of The Washington Post expressed his surprise at the fact that the cartoon originally ran on the BBC—a broadcaster he felt "a history of great TV"—since "the British cartoon seems mainly an imitation of American cartoon hits like Fox's The Simpsons and King of the Hill, instead of the kind of thing the British do best". He also had a low opinion of the title character, calling him "an imbecilic stumblebum who appears to deserve the bad things that happen to him" and negatively comparing him to Homer Simpson.

Alan Pergament of the Buffalo News gave the programme a two-star rating. He hoped that "Azaria's narration will be a little slower than that of the British voice performer" but remarked that "Eric is such a bumbler and his life is so stressful that it isn't much fun to watch". He also thought the comparison to South Park in the series' promos was foolish, noted that it ran against another Americanized version of a British series—Whose Line Is It Anyway?—and remarked that "as good as it is to get some original programming in the summer, Stressed Eric is so routine that it's difficult to understand why it has won awards across the ocean."

== DVD release ==
The Complete Stressed Eric Collection was released on DVD in the UK on 2 May 2011, with the following special features:

- The Story of Stressed Eric
- Drawing the Characters with Stig Bergqvist
- Audio Commentaries
- Animatic of Nativity Episode
- BBC2 Trails
- Storyboard Excerpt from Pony Episode
