= Quilley =

Quilley is a surname. Notable people with the surname include:

- Denis Quilley (1927–2003), English actor and singer
- Geoffrey Quilley (born 1961), British art historian

== See also ==
- Quigley
- Quilly (disambiguation)
