= Charlotte Klonk =

German art historian

Charlotte Klonk is a German art historian. Klonk is most notable for her work on English landscape art in the late eighteenth and early nineteenth century, as well as for her work on museum interiors, particularly the white cube. She is currently a professor of art history at the Humboldt University of Berlin.

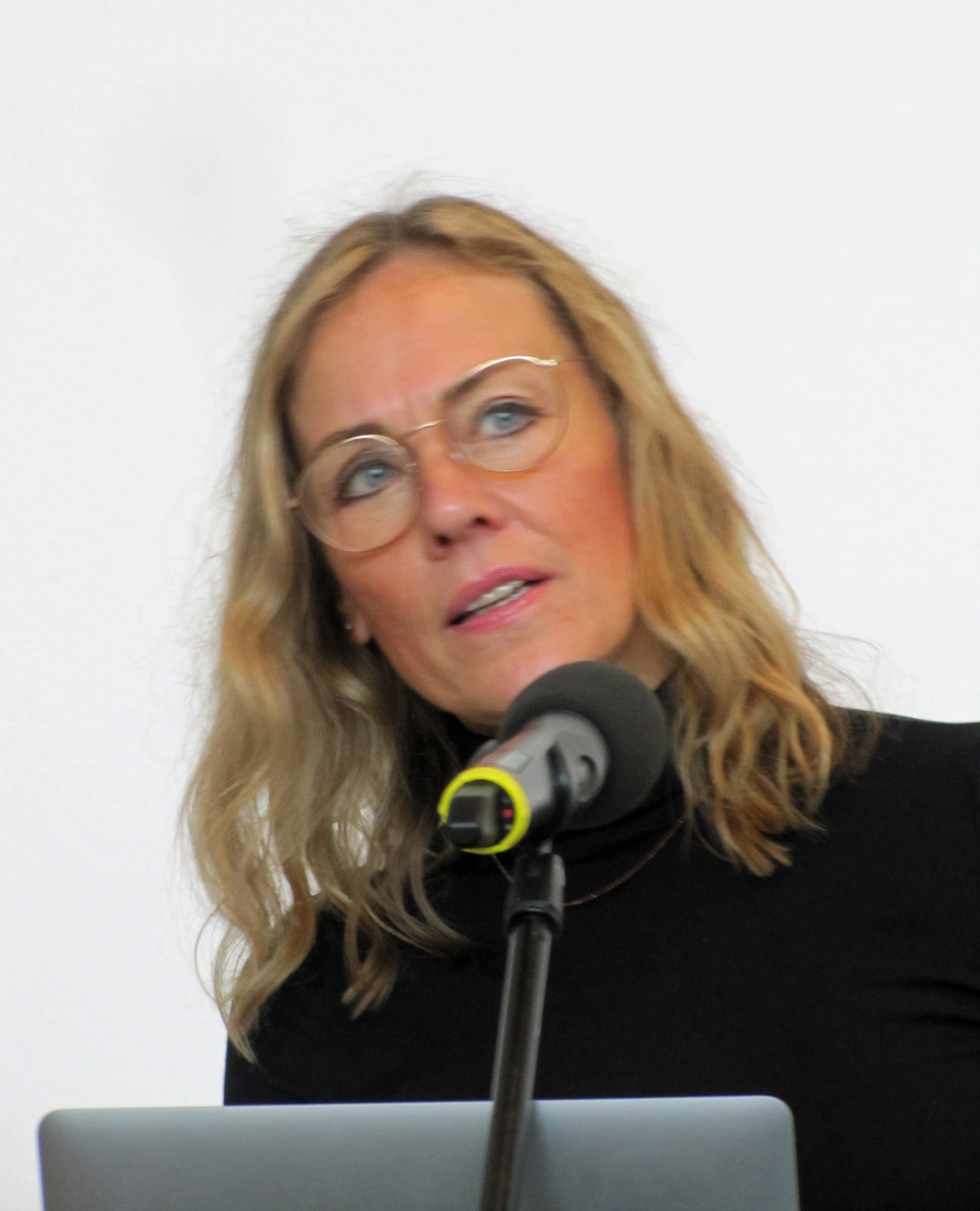
Photo of Charlotte Klonk taken during a presentation of a topic: never again peace? The Ukraine War and the New World Disorder", in 2022

== Life ==
Klonk studied art history at the Universities of Hamburg and Cambridge. She was a Ph.D. student at Newnham College, University of Cambridge from 1989 to 1992. The title of her thesis was „Science and the Perception of Nature: British Landscape Art in the late 18th and early 19th centuries". From 1992 to 1993 she worked at the Museum van Hedendaagse Kunst in Ghent (Director: Jan Hoet). In 1993 she received a Junior Research Fellowship at Christ Church, Oxford, and from 1995 to 2005 she was a lecturer at the Department of Art History at the University of Warwick. Since 2006 she has taught art history at the Humboldt University of Berlin.

== Awards, Grants, Prizes and Fellowships ==
From 1986 to 1990 Klonk received a scholarship from the Studienstiftung des Deutschen Volkes and from 1989 to 1992 a Postgraduate Scholarship from the British Academy, the DAAD and the Studienstiftung des Deutschen Volkes. In April 1998 her book Science and the Perception was selected as „Influential Book" by the American Society of Eighteenth Century Studies. From 2001 to 2002 Charlotte Klonk was an Alexander von Humboldt Fellow at the Max Planck Institute for the History of Science in Berlin and from 2005 to 2006 a Fellow at the Institute of Advanced Studies in Berlin. In 2009 she was chosen as a participant in the Berlin ProFil-Programme for university leaders.

In 2019 she became a member of the German Academy of Sciences Leopoldina.

== Books ==
- 1996 Science and the Perception of Nature: British Landscape Art in the Late Eighteenth and Early Nineteenth Centuries, New Haven and London, Yale University Press (reviewed among other places in The Times Literary Supplement, Gazette de Beaux Arts and Art History 1997)
- 2006 (with Michael Hatt), Art History: A Critical Introduction to Its Methods, Manchester, Manchester University Press (reviewed among other places in The Times Literary Supplement, 1 September 2006, and sehepunkte, 7 (2007), No. 3 [15 March 2007],
- 2009 Spaces of Experience: Art Gallery Interiors from 1800–2000, New Haven and London, Yale University Press (reviewed among other places in Frieze, 1 November 2009)
- 2017 Terror: Wenn Bilder zu Waffen werden, Frankfurt am Main, Fischer Verlag GmbH (reviewed among other places in Spiegel Online, 31 May 2017)

== Edited books ==
- 2008 (with Conny Becker, Franziska Solte and Friederike Schäfer): Metropolitan Views: Die Kunstszenen in Berlin und London, München, Deutscher Kunstverlag (reviewed among other places in TAZ, 30 July 2008, Berliner Morgenpost, 13 August 2008, Deutschlandradio Kultur, 21 August 2008, 10:33)

== Recent interviews ==
▪ 2006 Interview with Ruth Fühner for ‘Doppelkopf’, Hessischer Rundfunk 2, 29 August ▪ 2006 Interview with Johan Schloemann for the Süddeutsche Zeitung, 18 Oktober ▪ 2007 Interview with Ivan Howlett for ‘The Tragical Adventure of Heinrich von Kleist’, BBC Radio 3, 7 January ▪ 2008 Interview with Jürgen Werth for ‘Zeig mir Dein Gesicht”, Radio Bremen, 5 Juli ▪ 2009 Interview with Heinz-Jörg Graf for "Die Gelehrtenrepublik", Deutschlandradio Kultur, 30 December
