= Quilly =

Quilly may refer to:

- Quilly, Ardennes, a commune in the Ardennes department, France
- Quilly, Loire-Atlantique, a commune in the Loire-Atlantique department, France

== See also ==
- Quilley, a surname
