= Agony Again =

British television series

- Genre: Sitcom
- Created by: Len Richmond; Anna Raeburn
- Starring: Maureen Lipman; Maria Charles; David Harewood; Doon Mackichan
- Country of origin: United Kingdom
- Original language: English
- No. of series: 1
- No. of episodes: 7

Production
- Running time: 30 minutes

Original release
- Network: BBC1
- Release: 31 August – 12 October 1995

Agony Again is a British sitcom that aired on BBC1 in 1995. Starring Maureen Lipman, it is the sequel to Agony, an ITV sitcom that aired from 1979 to 1981. It was produced by the BBC after ITV turned it down; it had originally been pitched as a radio version for Radio 4. Agony Again was written by Carl Gorham, Michael Hatt, and Amanda Swift.

== Cast ==
- Maureen Lipman as Jane Lucas
- Maria Charles as Bea Fisher
- David Harewood as Daniel
- Doon Mackichan as Debra
- Sacha Grunpeter as Michael
- Niall Buggy as Richard
- Valerie Edmond as Catherine
- Robert Whitson as Will Brewer
- Simon Williams as Laurence Lucas

== Background ==
Fourteen years after Agony ended on ITV, the BBC revived it as Agony Again. The BBC had also revived other sitcoms, including Doctor in the House, The Liver Birds, and Reginald Perrin in the 1990s. Some of the original cast were used, although Simon Williams' character Laurence is not a main character like before.

== Plot ==
Jane Lucas now has her own television show, Lucas Live, but as before she neglects her own problems, including her son (who comes out as gay during the series), and focuses on other people's, especially homeless former businessman Richard. She has the beginnings of a romance with Daniel, a social worker. Jane's producer is Debra and her mother Bea, who was determined for her to remarry, is still a main character.

== Episodes ==
No.	Title	Original release date
1	"Heartbreak Hotel"	31 August 1995
2	"Love Will Find a Way"	7 September 1995
3	"Dazed and Confused"	14 September 1995
4	"Soap Dish"	21 September 1995
5	"Hound Dog"	28 September 1995
6	"Breaking Point"	5 October 1995
7	"Showtime"	12 October 1995
