= Eileen Dietz =

American actress

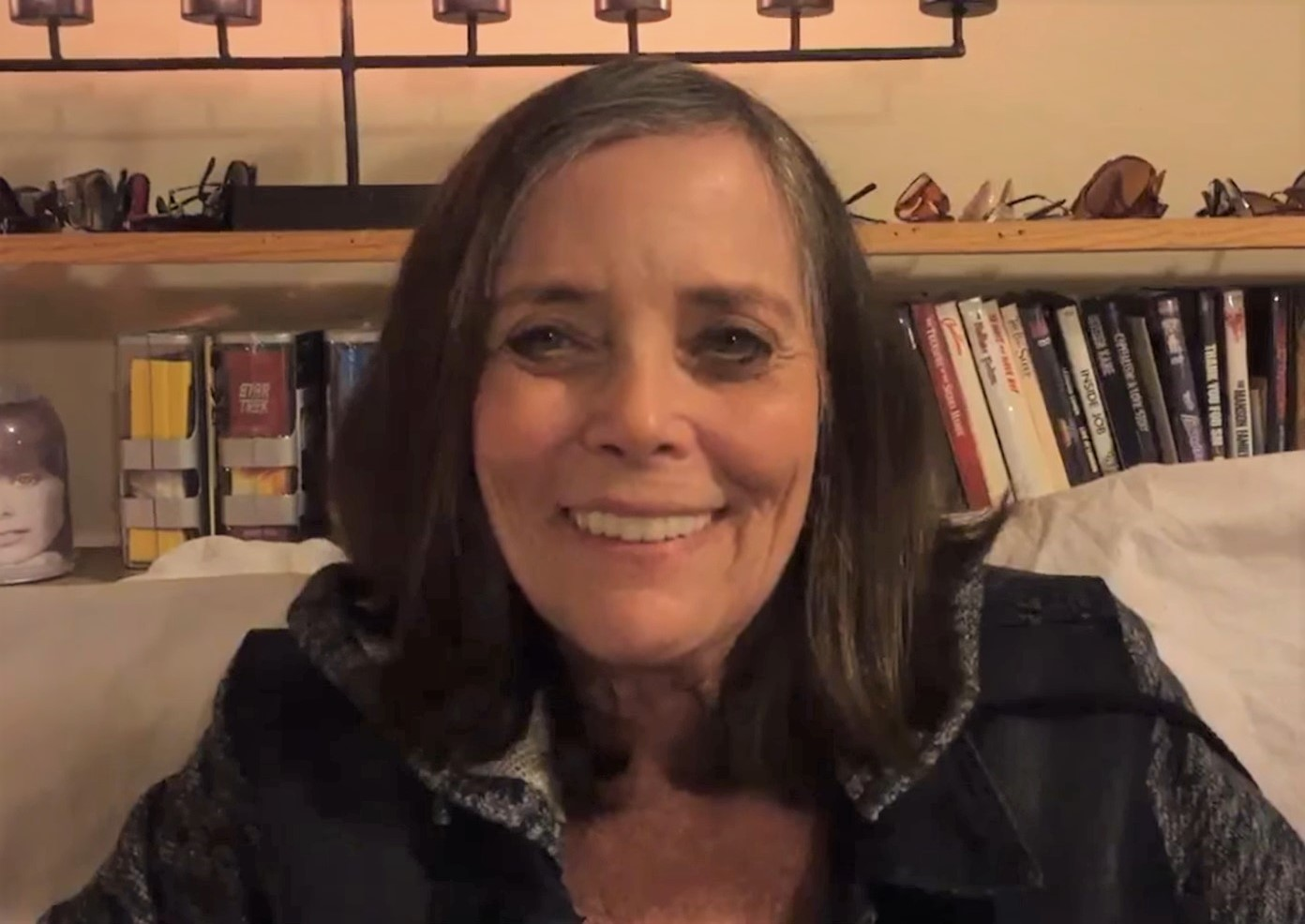
- Dietz in 2017
- Other names: Eileen Dietz Elber; Eileen Scott
- Occupation: Actress
- Years active: 1963–present
- Height: 157 cm (5 ft 1 in)
- Website: www.eileendietz.com

Eileen Dietz is an American actress who is best known for her appearances in many horror films such as the face of the demon in The Exorcist and for her portrayal of characters on the soap operas Guiding Light and General Hospital.

== Early life and career ==
As a child, Dietz appeared in commercials with her twin sister Marianne DeFossey, and beginning at the age of 12 she started studying acting at the Neighborhood Playhouse. She made her television debut in 1963 in a small guest role on The Doctors. Shortly thereafter she landed a recurring role on the soap opera Love of Life. She made her film debut starring in the 1966 movie Teenage Gang Debs as Ellie. The following year she portrayed Penny Wohl in the critically acclaimed independent film David Holzman's Diary. The film never got much in the way of theatrical distribution despite having Dietz's nude scene featured in Life Magazine's photo spread and in the book of the film. She did not recall if she auditioned for the role of Penny but she added, "it was a fun shoot."

Dietz spent much of the late 1960s and early 1970s appearing in theatre productions. She notably appeared Off-Broadway as the Young Girl in the premiere of Bruce Jay Friedman's Steambath at the Truck and Warehouse Theater in 1970. In 1972, she portrayed an androgynous runaway in the premiere of Joyce Carol Oates' Ontological Proof of My Existence. Her portrayal in the play led to an invitation to do a screen test for The Exorcist. She was cast in two memorable roles in the film: Pazuzu the demon (better known as the face of death), and the 'possessed Regan' (the Linda Blair character) in some scenes. She performed in scenes that were too violent or disturbing for Blair to perform, including the crucifix scene and the fistfight with Father Karras. She recalled that director William Friedkin gave her no notes and said, "I wasn't playing a little girl, I was playing the demon that possessed a little girl." Blair, who recalls Friedkin telling her the film would not succeed if she was not in as many shots as possible, estimates that Dietz is in 17 seconds of the film. Dietz, angry that her contribution to the film had been minimized, claimed in the media to have performed all the possession scenes. Warners ultimately measured her screen presence at 28.25 seconds, but denied that her contribution was dramatically significant.

After The Exorcist, Dietz had a highly active career on television during the 1970s, appearing as a guest star on such shows as Planet of the Apes, Korg: 70,000 B.C., Barnaby Jones, and Happy Days among others. She also portrayed the recurring role of Linette Waterman in the soap opera The Guiding Light and appeared in the films You Light Up My Life (1977) and Parts: The Clonus Horror (1979).

In 1980, Dietz joined the cast of General Hospital as Sarah Abbott, a role she played for several years. She also appeared as a guest star on Trapper John, M.D. (1982) and in the horror film Freeway Maniac (1989). More recent film credits include Naked in the Cold Sun (1997), Hurricane Festival (1997), Bad Guys (2000), Exorcism (2003), The Mojo Cafe (2004), Neighborhood Watch (2005), Constantine (2005), Karla (2006), Creepshow III (2006), Dog Lover's Symphony (2006), and Tracing Cowboys (2008).

Dietz appeared as Winnie Gilmore in Halloween II (2009) in an uncredited role.

Dietz was cast in the thriller Eden Falls, co-written by Victor Miller, creator of Friday the 13th, and then slated for a 2017 release. However, as of August 2020, the project was still in development.

== Filmography ==
Film
Year	Title	Role	Notes
1966	Teenage Gang Debs	Ellie	Credited as Eileen Scott
1967	David Holzman's Diary	Penny Wohl	
1967	The Game People Play		Credited as Eileen Scott
1973	The Exorcist	Pazuzu's face	Uncredited
1974	Road Movie		
1977	You Light Up My Life	Bridesmaid	
1979	Parts: The Clonus Horror	Dana	
1989	Freeway Maniac	Costume Girl	
1997	Naked in the Cold Sun	Sadie	
1997	Hurricane Festival	Junkie	
2000	Bad Guys	Bank Teller	
2000	Left-Overs	—	Set director
2003	Exorcism	Evil Nurse	
2004	The Mojo Cafe	Oscar	Short film
2005	Constantine	Zombie	Uncredited
2005	Neighborhood Watch	Mrs. Crews	
2006	Karla	Helen	Uncredited
2006	Creepshow III	Claire The Homeless Woman	Segment: Call Girl direct-to-video
2006	Dog Lover's Symphony	Frightened Mother	
2008	Tracing Cowboys	Marilyn	
2008	She Turns Back and Faces Forward at Peace	Judy	Short film
2009	Sibling Rivalry	Mrs. Peters	
2009	The Queen of Screams	Eleanor Maxwell	
2009	Void	Helen	Short film
2009	Halloween II	Winnie Gilmore	Uncredited
2010	Kadís	Librarian	Short film
2010	Freeway Killer	Alice Bonin Benton	
2010	Hookers for Jesus	Blanch	Short film
2010	Monsterpiece Theatre Volume 1	Nina	Segment: Rottentail
2010	Butterfly	Joy Greenstahl	also associate producer
2010	The Custom Mary	Mother	post-production
2010	See How They Run	Grace	post-production
2010	The Legend of the Mountain Witch	Creepy Lady	post-production
2010	Scream Queen Campfire	Ethel	Segment: Motherly Love
2010	Hallow Pointe	Fran	
2011	Little Big Boy	Jimmy's Mother - middle aged	
2011	Dead Girls Don't Cry	Diane Thomas	filming
2011	Stingy Jack	Esther Flower	pre-production
2012	Witches Playground		filming
2015	Fire Twister	Sadie - The Mountain Woman	Television film
2017	Eden Falls	Barbara	pre-production
2019	Itsy Bitsy	Sally	Post-production
2019	For We Are Many	Mrs. Vasile	Segment: The Damned Statue
2019	The Assent	Rhonda	
2020	The Amityville Harvest	Mrs. O'Brian	
2022	Staycation	Griselda E. Necromancer	
2023	The Fearway	Old Woman	
2023	Night of the Caregiver	Lillian Gresham	
2023	Lady Dreadcore	Lady Dreadcore	Short film
2023	Las Vegas Frankenstein	Shopkeeper's Wife	

Television
Year	Title	Role	Notes
1963	The Doctors		Guest role
	Love of Life		Recurring role
1974	Korg: 70,000 B.C.	Sala	
1974	Planet of the Apes	Jillia	Episode: The Good Seeds credited as Eileen Dietz Elber
1975	Barnaby Jones	Carol Deelon	Episode: Dangerous Summer
1976	Helter Skelter	Family Girl	Television film credited as Eileen Dietz Elber
1976	How to Break Up a Happy Divorce		Television film uncredited
1977	Happy Days	Rebecca	Episode: Time Capsule
1978	The Next Step Beyond		Episode: A Matter of Pride
1978	Guiding Light	Linette Waterman	
1980–1981	General Hospital	Sarah Abbot	
1982	Trapper John, M.D.	Sister Charity	Episode: The One and Only
2004	What Should You Do?	Vicki	Episodes: Bee Sting, Near Drowning
2005	Dante's Cove	Emily	Episodes: In the Beginning, Then There Was Darkness
2009	Tim and Eric Awesome Show, Great Job!	Mother	Episode: Origins
