= Tracing Cowboys =

- Directed by: Jason Wulfsohn
- Written by: Jason Wulfsohn; Sacha Grunpeter
- Produced by: Sacha Grunpeter; LazRael Lison; Jason Wulfsohn; Joe Gruberman
- Starring: Sacha Grunpeter; Megan Edwards
- Cinematography: David Rush Morrison
- Edited by: Matt Konicek
- Music by: Richard Dowlearn
- Production company: Vigilante Films
- Distributed by: Vanguard Cinema; IF Télévision
- Release date: 29 March 2008 (AFI Dallas Film Festival)
- Running time: 98 minutes
- Country: United States
- Language: English

Tracing Cowboys is a 2008 American romantic drama film directed by Jason Wolfsohn, starring Sacha Grunpeter and Megan Edwards. Grunpeter died on the film's last scheduled day of shooting.

== Cast ==
- Sacha Grunpeter as Ethan
- Megan Edwards as Debbie
- Eileen Dietz as Marilyn
- Alvaro Alvarez as Fernando
- Ana Alvarez as Alba
- Veronica Fernandez as Estrella

== Release ==
The film premiered at the AFI Dallas International Film Festival on 29 March 2008.

== Reception ==
Joe Leydon of Variety wrote that the film's issues include Wolfsohn's "inability to follow his initial gameplan" and Grunpeter's voiceover narration. He also wrote that due to Grunpeter's death, his performance "comes off as compelling but, alas, incomplete." Despite the film's issues, Leydon wrote that it "has a curiosity value that cannot be measured or denied", and "may prove most instructive for anyone — academics, film buffs, would-be feature helmers — who’s curious to see how a filmmaker copes with a worst-case scenario."

Mark Olsen of the Los Angeles Times wrote that while the film "does have a certain impressionist grace", its "romantic ideal of the road -- lonely diners, vintage cars and seaside shanties -- seems misplaced, oversimplified and overused."

Ernest Hady of LA Weekly wrote that while Morrison's cinematography gives the film a "meditative beauty", Edwards' voice-over is "filled with clichéd philosophizing" and "drags the film down".
