= Sacha Grunpeter =

British actor

- Born: Sacha Grunpeter; 14 September 1971; London, UK
- Died: 6 July 2005 (aged 33); Los Angeles, California
- Occupation: Actor

Sacha Grunpeter (14 September 1971 – 6 July 2005) was a British actor best known for his portrayal of Michael in Agony Again and Didier Baptiste in Dream Team, where he went by the name of Tom Redhill. He died in a car accident on the final day of shooting Tracing Cowboys, which he co-wrote, produced and portrayed the character Ethan.
