= Michael Hatt =

British art historian

- Born: 1960 (age 65–66)
- Occupation: Professor of art history

Academic background
- Education: University of London
- Doctoral advisor: Lynda Nead

Academic work
- Discipline: Art historian
- Institutions: University of Warwick; Yale University; University of Nottingham

Michael Hatt (born 1960) is professor of art history at the University of Warwick. He has served there since 2007, before which he was head of research at the Yale Center for British Art. He is the author with Charlotte Klonk of Art History: A Critical Introduction to Its Methods (2006), and editor with Morna O'Neill of The Edwardian Sense: Art, Design, and Performance in Britain, 1901–1910 (2010). In 2014, he co-curated Sculpture Victorious: Art in an Age of Invention, 1837–1901, an exhibition at the Yale Center for British Art that transferred to Tate Britain in 2015.

== Career ==
Hatt completed his BA in art history at Birkbeck College, University of London, while working as a civil servant. He later received his PhD in art history from the same institution, where he taught courses from 1991 to 2000. He then took a teaching position at the University of Nottingham.

He was a co-curator with Jason Edwards and Martina Droth, of Sculpture Victorious: Art in an Age of Invention, 1837–1901, an exhibition at the Yale Center for British Art in 2014 that transferred to Tate Britain in 2015. The exhibition was the first to examine the creation and viewing of British sculpture of the Victorian age and was the result of new ideas that the curators had developed over a number of years about Victorian sculpture. In a review of the exhibition for 19: Interdisciplinary Studies in the Long Nineteenth Century, Clare Walker Gore praised Hatt and Edwards for not pandering to modern taste in sculpture by including only those works that modern critics approve of, "choosing instead to showcase a broad range of works, ranging from those likely to charm modern viewers to those likely to appal, and often placing them side by side." Philip Ward-Jackson in Sculpture Journal, however, criticised the curator's selection of objects and accompanying catalogue which he felt had a lack of coherence due to being jointly written.

Hatt is professor of the history of art at the University of Warwick where he specialises in nineteenth-century British and American art, focussing on gender, sexuality, and visual racism. He is also interested in Danish art and the history of art history.

== Selected publications ==
=== Books ===
- Art History: A Critical Introduction to Its Methods. Manchester University Press, Manchester, 2006. (With Charlotte Klonk)
- Britain in the World: Highlights from the Yale Center for British Art in Honor of Amy Meyers. Yale University Press, 2019. (With Martina Droth & Nathan Flis) ISBN 9780300247473

=== Edited volumes ===
- The Edwardian Sense: Art, Design, and Performance in Britain, 1901–1910. Yale Center for British Art, 2010. (Edited with Morna O'Neill)

=== Journal articles and book chapters ===
- "Thoughts and Things: Sculpture and the Victorian Nude" in Alison Smith (Ed.) (2002) Exposed: The Victorian Nude. New York: Watson-Guptill. pp. 36–49.
- "Uranians and Imperialists", in eds. Timothy Barringer, Douglas Fordham, and Geoffrey Quilley, Art and the British Empire, Manchester University Press, 2007.
- "Space, Surface, Self: Homosexuality and the Aesthetic Interior", Visual Culture in Britain, Vol. 8, No. 1, Summer 2007, pp. 105–128.
- "A Great Sight: Henry Scott Tuke and His Models", in eds. Jane Desmarais, Martin Postle, and William Vaughan, Models and Supermodels: The Artist's Model in Britain, Manchester University Press, 2006, pp. 89–104.
- "Near and Far: Hamo Thornycroft's Mower and the Homoerotics of Labour", Art History, Vol. 26, No. 1, 2003, pp. 26–55.
