= Geoffrey Quilley =

Geoffrey Quilley (born 1961) is professor of art history at the University of Sussex. He was previously curator of fine art at the National Maritime Museum, Greenwich, and before that lecturer at the University of Leicester. Quilley studied at the University of Warwick at both undergraduate (BA Hons) and postgraduate (PhD) levels.

== Selected publications ==
=== Articles ===
- "'By cruel foes oppress'd': British naval draughtsmen in Tahiti and the South Pacific in the 1840s", Journal of Historical Geography, 43. pp. 71–84. ISSN 0305-7488
- "Introduction: mapping the art of travel and exploration", Journal of Historical Geography, 43. pp. 2–8. ISSN 0305-7488
- "Art history and double consciousness: visual culture and eighteenth-century maritime Britain", Eighteenth-Century Studies, 48 (1). pp. 21–35. ISSN 0013-2586

=== Books ===
- Empire to Nation: Art, History, and the Visualization of Maritime Britain, 1768-1829. Paul Mellon Centre for Studies in British Art. Yale University Press, New Haven and London, 2011. ISBN 9780300175684
- Art for the Nation: The Oil Paintings Collections of the National Maritime Museum. National Maritime Museum, London, 2006. ISBN 9780948065767
