= Hattie Tavernier =

Fictional character from the BBC soap opera EastEnders

- EastEnders character
- Portrayed by: Michelle Gayle (1990–1993); Uncredited (1994)
- Duration: 1990–1994
- First appearance: Episode 565; 5 July 1990
- Last appearance: Episode 947; 24 February 1994
- Introduced by: Michael Ferguson
In-universe information
- Occupation: Personal assistant
- Father: Celestine Tavernier
- Mother: Etta Tavernier
- Brothers: Clyde Tavernier; Lloyd Tavernier
- Grandfathers: Jules Tavernier
- Nephews: Kofi Tavernier
- First cousins: Gidea Thompson

Hattie Tavernier is a fictional character from the BBC soap opera EastEnders, played by Michelle Gayle between 5 July 1990 and 21 December 1993. Hattie and her family were introduced in July 1990 by producer Michael Ferguson. The Taverniers were the first collective black family to join the soap at the same time. Portrayed as an intelligent, independent young woman, Hattie remained in the serial after the departures of many of her screen family, covering issues such as miscarriage and sexual harassment.

Michelle Gayle quit the role in 1993 to embark on a pop career. Gayle filmed no official exit storyline for Hattie. Her last scene aired on 21 December 1993, with Hattie departing to visit her parents off-screen in Norwich for the Christmas holidays. Dialogue between characters at this time suggested that it was a temporary departure; however, Gayle left to pursue a singing career and did not return to the role. The character was hastily written out, appearing briefly one last time in February 1994 to show that Hattie decided to remain in Norwich. In the scene, Hattie's former lover Steve Elliot (Mark Monero) witnessed Hattie in the distance with another man. This fleeting appearance was played by a non-speaking and uncredited extra.

== Character creation and development ==
=== Background ===
In the latter part of 1989 EastEnders acquired a new executive producer named Michael Ferguson, who took over from Mike Gibbon. Ferguson had previously been a producer on ITV's The Bill—a hard-hitting, gritty and successful police drama, which seemed to be challenging EastEnders in providing a realistic vision of modern life in London. Due to his success on The Bill, Peter Cregeen, the Head of Series at the BBC, poached Ferguson to become executive producer of EastEnders.

Following a relatively unsuccessful inclination towards comic storylines throughout 1989, Ferguson decided to take the soap in a new direction in 1990. Big changes were implemented both off-screen and on-screen. Ferguson altered the way the episodes were produced, changed the way the storylines were conceptualised and introduced a far greater amount of location work than had previously been seen. EastEnders scriptwriter Colin Brake has said that it was a challenging period, but "the results on-screen were a programme with a new sense of vitality, and a programme more in touch with the real world than it had been for a while".

As a consequence of these changes, a large number of characters were axed in early 1990 as the new production machine cleared way for a new direction and new characters. Among the new characters were the Jamaican Tavernier family, who collectively arrived on-screen in July 1990, composed of grandfather Jules (Tommy Eytle), his son and daughter-in-law Celestine (Leroy Golding) and Etta (Jacqui Gordon-Lawrence), their eldest son Clyde (Steven Woodcock), and their twins Lloyd (Garey Bridges) and Hattie, played by Michelle Gayle. Colin Brake has described the Taverniers as the major new addition that year, and it heralded the first time that an entire family had joined the serial all at once. Their introduction has also been described as a well-intentioned attempt to portray a wider range of black characters than had previously been achieved on the soap.

=== Casting ===
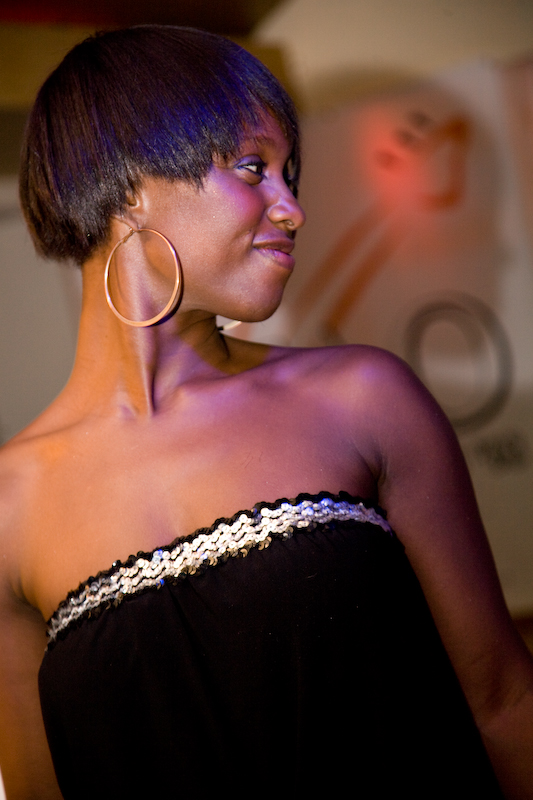
Michelle Gayle (pictured) was required to "play down" for the role of Hattie.

At age 19, actress Michelle Gayle—already familiar to the younger audience for her role in Grange Hill—was required to "play down" for the role, because Hattie and her brother Lloyd were 15-year-old school children. The casting of the Tavernier family has been described as difficult by producer Corinne Hollingworth. In 1991, she commented, "The most difficult job we've had was finding six black actors who fitted the bill for the Tavernier family. Here we needed two teenagers [Hattie and Lloyd] who looked around fifteen, but were actually older, had left school and had mature attitudes to work. They had to love music, hanging around in tracksuits and, most importantly, they had to look as if they could be twins." At the time Gayle commented that she loved playing younger parts, and found having Garey Bridges as her younger brother a great bonus: "It turns out that he and I know the same crowd of people in North London so we are often out together at night."

It took a long time to cast the complete Tavernier family. Once EastEnders became a success, the producers had no difficulties in finding "good actors" who wanted to join the cast; however, what became hard was finding families—combinations of performers who "look and sound as though they could be related." According to producers Corinne Hollingworth and Pat Sandys, the Taveriner family were especially difficult as four generations of the family were being featured. Hollingworth has commented, "The most difficult job we've had was finding six black actors who fitted the bill for the Tavernier family. Here we needed two teenagers who looked around fifteen but were actually older, had left school and had mature attitudes to work. They had to love music, hanging around in tracksuits and most important, they had to look as if they could be twins. And for Clyde, we needed someone who looked as though he'd been a boxer but also seemed thoughtful."

=== Personality ===
Writer Kate Lock has suggested that "Hattie was an intelligent girl with a promising future." Of her demeanour upon her introduction, author Rupert Smith has surmised that of the Taverniers, only Hattie seemed to be a happy child, but added that "her time would come", later referencing Hattie's misfortune with men as evidence of his classification of her as an "eternal victim".

Hilary Kingsley, author of The EastEnders Handbook, has described the character of Hattie in 1991: "Hattie is almost too well-balanced and happy to live in Albert Square. She loves music, sport, and could have a string of boyfriends but, unlike Sam Butcher, she's not yet interested. Clever at school, particularly at science, Hattie looks up to her big brother, Clyde, and protects her twin brother Lloyd, who is slower and quieter and can seem a bit of a wimp. She even let her own schoolwork slip at times to help him. Bossy, giggly and garrulous, she was an instant success helping as a waitress at Ian Beale's functions, even though it caused her parents distress. Hattie is as bright as her mother and loyal to her father. When her parents were quarrelling she was deeply upset, but nothing can dampen her natural good humour for long."

=== Departure ===
Gayle was permitted time off from filming in the summer of 1993 to develop a singing career. She returned to filming later in the year but decided to quit the role permanently at the end of 1993 to focus on music. On-screen, Hattie departed in December 1993 to visit her parents off-screen and never returned. The character appeared briefly one last time in February 1994 to explain Hattie's departure; however, Michelle Gayle did not reprise the role and this fleeting appearance was played by a non-speaking and uncredited extra.

Reflecting on her time in the soap in 2007, Gayle said, "There were 19 million people watching every episode. People would come up to me in the street and ask things like, 'Hattie, what's going on with you and Ian?'. They always had a comment to make - and always as if it was the first time you had heard it. But you would think, 'how many times today?'." She added that "I remember chilling with Sid Owen [who plays Ricky Butcher] and Danniella Westbrook [who plays Sam Mitchell] in our dressing rooms all the time and just really laughing a lot".

In 2008, when asked if she would return to the serial, Gayle commented, "I'd go back for Sid Owen. It's great now they've got him and Patsy Palmer [who plays Bianca Jackson] back in it - it's such a big show. If the producers asked me back and there was a good storyline, I'd definitely return."

== Storylines ==
Hattie and her family move to Albert Square in the summer of 1990. The head of the Tavernier household, Celestine (Leroy Golding), is a strict, religious man and despite having a strong personality, Hattie is made to obey his rules. Hattie becomes friendly with local girl Samantha Mitchell (Danniella Westbrook), but while Sam concentrates on boys and her modelling career, Hattie prefers to focus on school work.

Hattie is often forced to act older than her years to cope with her family's problems, standing by her brother Clyde (Steven Woodcock) when he is falsely accused of murdering Eddie Royle (Michael Melia), standing up to her father and acting as the voice of reason to her twin brother Lloyd (Garey Bridges), whose behaviour becomes problematic. Hattie lets her own school work suffer to help her less academic brother. Hattie's hard work at school pays off and she receives excellent grades in her final year exams, so it angers her parents when, at 16, she announces that she is leaving school to work as a waitress for Ian Beale (Adam Woodyatt) at his catering company, The Meal Machine. She soon becomes his personal assistant.

She excels in her work but Ian confuses her keen attitude towards her job as a come-on; he uses his position to sexually harass her but Hattie puts a stop to this by kneeing him in the groin when he tries to kiss her. Irrespective of this setback, Hattie remains working with Ian, despite his wife Cindy (Michelle Collins) doing everything in her power to get her sacked as she sees her as a threat. Hattie begins a relationship with her school friend Steve Elliot (Mark Monero), who gets a job as chef at the Meal Machine in 1992. Hattie feels the relationship has a future, so when her parents decide to leave Walford that same year, she stays behind with her grandfather Jules (Tommy Eytle) and older brother Clyde. Hattie loves Steve, but he takes the relationship less seriously. To Steve's surprise, Hattie proposes to him on New Year's Eve 1992. He accepts despite reservations. Hattie busily prepares for her upcoming wedding, but when Steve loses his job, he has second thoughts about marrying. Hattie's enemy, Mandy Salter (Nicola Stapleton), helps to convince Steve he is not ready for marriage and takes a job on an ocean liner without telling Hattie that he is leaving. Hattie is secretly pregnant and follows Steve to Southampton. When she finds him, an emotional scene results in them having sex. Hattie thinks that Steve has changed his mind about going but he believes their tryst is a final goodbye and Hattie returns to Walford alone. Hattie does not tell Steve about the pregnancy and after confiding in Michelle Fowler (Susan Tully), a single parent, Hattie decides to have an abortion. Hattie books it, but changes her mind at the last minute, deciding to keep the baby. However, she miscarries the next day.

Left nursing a broken heart, Hattie visits her parents in Norwich in December 1993 to spend Christmas with her family and does not return, having decided to make a fresh start away from Walford. Steve returns to Walford in February 1994, hoping to reunite with Hattie and even goes to Norwich to win her back but discovers that she has moved on and is dating another man.

== Reception ==
In the 1992 book Come on down?: popular media culture in post-war Britain, the authors have referenced Hattie and the rest of the Tavernier family as non-white characters who appeared to have been integrated into part of the predominantly white communal setting of the soap. However, they suggested that this attempt at inclusion "is the single clue to an understanding of why EastEnders is a development of an old form of representation of working-class life. The ethnic minority households are accepted in the working-class community, but the black, white and Asian families remain culturally distinct." They suggested that there was no attempt to portray hybridity between black-white cultures.

Robert Clyde Allen has discussed the Tavernier family in his 1995 book To be continued--: soap operas around the world. He suggested that black characters in EastEnders were incorporated into the working-class culture of the soap as opposed to offering something different from it. He noted that the Taverniers, the focus of black characters in the early 1990s, for a while had the same mixture of generations and attitudes that characterized the Fowlers, one of the soap's core white families who had a dominant position in the series. However he stated that "somewhat typically [...] the family broke up leaving the teenage Hattie on her own."
