= Jules Tavernier (EastEnders) =

Fictional character

- EastEnders character
- Portrayed by: Tommy Eytle
- Duration: 1990–1997
- First appearance: Episode 565; 5 July 1990
- Last appearance: Episode 1549; 23 December 1997
- Introduced by: Michael Ferguson
In-universe information
- Occupation: Retired
- Sons: Celestine Tavernier
- Daughters: Elizabeth Thompson
- Grandsons: Clyde Tavernier; Lloyd Tavernier
- Granddaughters: Hattie Tavernier; Gidea Thompson
- Other relatives: Kofi Tavernier

Jules Tavernier is a fictional character from the BBC soap opera EastEnders, played by Tommy Eytle between 5 July 1990 and 23 December 1997. Jules is depicted as a flirtatious older gentleman. He is introduced in 1990 and remains in the show after the departures of all of his on-screen family. He is largely semi-regular during the latter part of his stint, and is not featured again after December 1997. Jules Tavernier appeared in more than 150 episodes over his seven-year tenure.

== Creation and development ==
In the latter part of 1989 EastEnders acquired a new executive producer (EP) named Michael Ferguson, whom took over from Mike Gibbon. Ferguson had previously been a producer on ITV's The Bill – a hard-hitting, gritty and successful police drama, which seemed to be challenging EastEnders in providing a realistic vision of modern life in London. Due to his success on The Bill, Peter Cregeen, the Head of Series at the BBC, poached Ferguson to become executive producer of EastEnders.

Following a relatively unsuccessful inclination towards comic storylines throughout 1989, Ferguson decided to take the soap in a new direction in 1990. Big changes were implemented both off-screen and on-screen. Ferguson altered the way the episodes were produced, changed the way the storylines were conceptualised and introduced a far greater amount of location work than had previously been seen. EastEnders scriptwriter Colin Brake said that it was a challenging period, but "the results on-screen were a programme with a new sense of vitality, and a programme more in touch with the real world than it had been for a while".

As a consequence of these changes, a large number of characters were axed in early 1990 as the new production machine cleared way for a new direction and new characters. Among the new characters were the Jamaican Tavernier family, who collectively arrived on-screen in July 1990, composed of grandfather Jules (Tommy Eytle), his son and daughter-in-law Celestine (Leroy Golding) and Etta (Jacqui Gordon-Lawrence), their eldest son Clyde (Steven Woodcock), and their twins Lloyd (Garey Bridges) and Hattie, played by Michelle Gayle. Colin Brake described the Taverniers as the major new additions that year, and it heralded the first time that an entire family had joined the serial all at once. Their introduction was also described as a well-intentioned attempt to portray a wider range of black characters than had previously been achieved on the soap.

Author Hilary Kingsley described Jules as a character who "enjoys turning on the charm [...] and raising his hat to all the ladies with a smile and a twinkle in his eye. He's not a moaner and his old-world flirting makes a pleasant change." Stephen Bourne in The Independent stated that Jules "found himself recognised everywhere as the wise senior citizen, always ready to offer sensible advice and often recalling his involvement in the 1937 oilfield strikes back home in Trinidad." Author Kate Lock suggested that Jules "revelled in his mildly eccentric reputation. He loved to talk about the old days in Trinidad and had always been a bit of a ladykiller [...] Even in his 70s, Jules was still chasing women." Tommy Eytle, who played Jules was a musician, and his part in EastEnders occasionally gave him an opportunity to sing, usually in the soap's public house the Queen Vic.

Jules appeared less frequently during the latter part of his time in EastEnders because of Eytle's ill health. He was never officially written out of the serial, but was not featured again after December 1997. Eytle died in 2007.

== Storylines ==
Jules is from Trinidad but lived in Jamaica until he came to England on holiday in 1968. He stayed to help look after his son's newborn child, so that his daughter-in-law could do teacher training and work part-time. Jules' wife had died young and he had never settled in Jamaica, so when his other grandchildren came along, he had a full-time job helping the family and stayed in England.

Jules arrives in Albert Square in July 1990 with the rest of the Tavernier family. He is an instant hit with the older ladies of Walford, and he regularly flirts with Walford stalwarts Ethel Skinner (Gretchen Franklin) and Dot Cotton (June Brown). Jules is a gambling man, and could often be seen playing cards with John Royle (Paddy Joyce) when he was visiting from Ireland. Jules is an easy-going, jovial person and his main purpose in his early years is to give support to his family and offer advice. Jules is so at home in Walford that he decides to stay when his son and daughter-in-law move to Norwich in 1992; his grandchildren, Clyde (Steven Woodcock) and Hattie (Michelle Gayle), remain with him. Jules is an independent person, despite his age, however this changes for a period in August 1992, after he is mugged by a couple of girls (one of the muggers was played by the singer Emma Bunton). After stealing his money, one of the girls beats him over the head with a plank of wood. Jules is left shaken and ashamed by the ordeal. He eventually recovers and regains his confidence with the help of his friend, Dot, who nurses him better.

In 1993, Jules received an unannounced visit from Gidea Thompson (Sian Martin), who is his granddaughter from an affair he had in his 20s. He soon bonds with her but is horrified when he finds out that she and his grandson, Clyde, are dating. Clyde ignores his grandfather's protests and eventually moves to Trinidad to be with Gidea. Both Nellie Ellis (Elizabeth Kelly) and Blossom Jackson (Mona Hammond) live with Jules at different stages, but although they flirt with him, their relationships remain strictly platonic. In later years, he sparks up a friendship with local barber Felix Kawalski (Harry Landis) and the two are often seen playing chess in The Queen Vic. Although he does not exit on-screen, it is believed that Jules is residing in sheltered accommodation away from Albert Square. His last appearance on-screen was in December 1997.
