= Celestine and Etta Tavernier =

Fictional characters from the BBC soap opera EastEnders

- EastEnders character
- Portrayed by: Leroy Golding (Celestine); Jacqui Gordon-Lawrence (Etta)
- Duration: 1990–1993 (Celestine); 1990−1992, 1994 (Etta)
- First appearance: Episode 563; 28 June 1990 (Celestine); Episode 565; 5 July 1990 (Etta)
- Last appearance: Episode 884; 22 July 1993 (Celestine); Episode 949; 3 March 1994 (Etta)
- Introduced by: Michael Ferguson (1990); Leonard Lewis (1993, 1994)
In-universe information
- Father: Jules Tavernier (Celestine's)
- Half-sisters: Elizabeth Thompson (Celestine's)
- Sons: Clyde Tavernier; Lloyd Tavernier
- Daughters: Hattie Tavernier
- Grandsons: Kofi Tavernier
- Nieces: Gidea Thompson (Celestine's)

Celestine and Etta Tavernier are fictional characters from the BBC soap opera EastEnders, played by Leroy Golding and Jacqui Gordon-Lawrence respectively. Both appear primarily in the serial as a married couple between 1990 and 1992. Celestine makes a further guest appearance in 1993, while Etta makes a guest appearance in 1994, both visiting remaining members of the Tavernier family. Celestine is portrayed as a strict disciplinarian and a devout Christian who expects everyone in his family to show similar dedication to the church and abide by his rules. His unwavering demand for respect often alienates his children and almost causes the breakdown of his marriage. Also religious, Etta is portrayed as a career woman; her most prominent storylines concern marital problems and crises of faith.

== Creation and development ==
In the latter part of 1989 EastEnders acquired a new executive producer, Michael Ferguson, whom took over from Mike Gibbon. Ferguson had previously been a producer on ITV's The Bill — a hard-hitting, gritty and successful police drama, which seemed to be challenging EastEnders in providing a realistic vision of modern life in London. Due to his success on The Bill, Peter Cregeen, the Head of Series at the BBC, poached Ferguson to become executive producer of EastEnders.

Following a relatively unsuccessful inclination towards comic storylines throughout 1989, Ferguson decided to take the soap in a new direction in 1990. Big changes were implemented both off-screen and on-screen. Ferguson altered the way the episodes were produced, changed the way the storylines were conceptualised and introduced a far greater amount of location work than had previously been seen. EastEnders scriptwriter Colin Brake has said that it was a challenging period, but "the results on-screen were a programme with a new sense of vitality, and a programme more in touch with the real world than it had been for a while".

As a consequence of these changes, a large number of characters were axed in early 1990 as the new production machine cleared way for a new direction and new characters. Among the new characters were the Jamaican Tavernier family, who collectively arrived on-screen in July 1990, composed of grandfather Jules (Tommy Eytle), his son and daughter-in-law Celestine (Leroy Golding) and Etta (Jacqui Gordon-Lawrence), their eldest son Clyde (Steven Woodcock), and their twins Lloyd (Garey Bridges) and Hattie, played by Michelle Gayle. Colin Brake has described the Taverniers as the major new additions that year, and it heralded the first time that an entire family had joined the serial all at once. Their introduction has also been described as a well-intentioned attempt to portray a wider range of black characters than had previously been achieved on the soap.

Etta was Gordon-Lawrence's first television role. Golding, a relatively inexperienced actor at the time of his casting, was sent to audition for the part of Celestine as a means of getting him used to the audition process. He was awarded the part and claims that his inexperience helped rather than hindered the Tavernier family to gel together as it created a sense of "camaraderie" among them; he suggests that he and his screen wife Gordon-Lawrence "played very well off each other".

The Taverniers backstory scripted them as Trinidadian immigrants, who came to the UK in the 1960s and battled their way through a racist society to achieve. Kingsley describes Etta as "the real boss at home, clever enough to let Celestine and Jules believe they were the heads of the household" Meanwhile, Celestine has been described "as someone so straight and upstanding that he'd have to be given a surgical procedure in order to have an unclean thought." Author Hilary Kingsley suggests that Celestine was the "most upright, law-abiding citizen of Albert Square [...] but he doesn't get much thanks for it." She goes on to say that Celestine is "not a happy man, though. He knows his father thinks he has lost his roots. His older son Clyde thinks he has 'sold out' and accepted the prejudices of his bosses who've been slow to promote him. His twins wish he'd loosen up and get excited about something other than their school reports and the cricket results." Kingsley suggests that it was Celestine's relationship with Etta that proved most problematic for him however, stating that "He loves [Etta] and has always been loyal. but when she decided to push ahead in her career he began to feel slighted."

Celestine and Etta's most prominent storylines concerned marital difficulties. Kingsley suggests that Etta's independence and decision to undergo sterilisation and have an abortion, wounded Celestine's male pride and plunged their marriage into turmoil. However, the Taverniers marriage remained intact when "Celestine realised he had to change or he'd be the loser".

Half the Tavernier family, including Celestine, Etta and Lloyd were written out of the serial in 1992. On-screen Celestine was given a promotion in Norwich and left Walford. However, Celestine appeared again in 1993 and Etta in 1994 as part of storylines that were focusing on the remaining characters of the Tavernier family, Jules, Hattie and Clyde.

== Storylines ==
=== Backstory ===
Celestine and Etta were born in Trinidad. Celestine was raised by his grandmother after his mother died and his father left to find work in Jamaica. He came to Britain in 1966, recruited by London Transport, with the intention of studying at evening classes for a white-collar job. It was a time when most West-Indians were expected to work on the buses or in hospitals and not to be too ambitious. However, he achieved his ambition, conformed and worked hard and eventually got promoted to manager at Walford Department of Social Security (DSS). Celestine married Etta in Jamaica and after the birth of their first son in 1968 she joined Celestine in England, later having two more children. Etta decided to train for a job that she knew she could do well - teaching.

=== 1990–1994 ===
Celestine and Etta and their three children, Clyde (Steven Woodcock), the oldest, and twins Hattie (Michelle Gayle) and Lloyd (Garey Bridges), move to Albert Square along with Celestine's father Jules (Tommy Eytle), when they are rehoused by the council in 1990 after Etta acquires a new job teaching at Walford Primary School.

Celestine is put in an awkward position in 1990 when he discovers that Arthur Fowler (Bill Treacher) is working and signing on for dole money at the same time. He eventually decides that he cannot 'turn a blind eye' to Arthur's fraudulent behaviour and turns him in to the authorities at his work, but his self-righteous attitude earns him few friends on the square.

Celestine is unwavering with his expectations of his offspring. He demands respect and adherence at all times, and because of this he finds it extremely difficult to relate to his children, who often feel that his strict rules are harsh and unfair. Celestine has a tempestuous relationship with Clyde in particular. Clyde feels that his father has 'sold out' by accepting the prejudices of his bosses who are slow to promote him, whilst Celestine cannot relate to Clyde's lack of ambition. He is also regularly accused of turning his back on his roots by his father Jules and because Jules never went through Celestine's struggles for acceptance in a white community, he doesn't really understand his son.

Celestine is a dedicated Church-goer and spends most of his spare time performing religious readings and educating 'young disciples' in the teachings of the Bible. Etta is also a devout Christian and a dedicated mother, but the big love of her life is teaching, so she is thrilled when she gets promoted to 'acting head' at Walford primary in 1991. However, Celestine blights what should have been a happy time for Etta by continuously arguing with her about her new job. Celestine, is unhappy about Etta's promotion as he feels threatened by her higher status and earning power and believes that she has deliberately set out to undermine his status as the head of the household. The rift between them nearly drives Celestine into the arms of another woman whom he had been mentoring in bible studies. The woman, Yvonne (Pamela Nomvete), wants more than friendship from Celestine and propositions him one night following a row with Etta. It is a testing time for Celstine, but the sanctity of marriage is more important to him and he manages to resist the temptation.

Their marriage is tested again later in 1991 when Etta decides that she wants to undergo sterilization in order not to pass on her Sickle-cell gene to any future children (their youngest son Lloyd has already inherited the gene and his life has been severely limited because of this). Celestine refuses to entertain the idea, however, as he feels that such an act goes against their religious principles. Etta decides to go ahead with the sterilisation anyway, only to discover that she is already pregnant and that her unborn child is carrying a double dose of the sickle-cell gene. Upon realising this Celestine is forced to reappraise his priorities and to agree, unwillingly, to a termination. It is a traumatic time for the Taverniers, but the ordeal eventually manages to bring them closer and they emerge from it a much stronger couple.

In 1992 Etta is offered a permanent role as head teacher at Walford primary and Celestine proves that he has learnt from his past mistakes by showing genuine happiness for Etta's success. However, in June of that year Celestine is offered a promotion in Norwich. Etta is unwilling to move but after Lloyd gets into trouble with the police for joy-riding, she decides that a fresh start for the family might be best. So the couple leave Walford for a new start.

Celestine returns briefly in July 1993 when he finds out that his daughter is planning on marrying Steve Elliot (Mark Monero) and is extremely shocked to find out that she is pregnant. Celestine is also shocked to meet his previously unknown of niece, Gidea Thompson (Sian Martin), and he is appalled to find out that his father, Jules, had abandoned Gidea's grandmother - who at the time was pregnant with Gidea's mother - many years earlier.

Etta returns briefly in February 1994 to stop Steve (Hattie's ex-boyfriend) from attempting to contact her daughter when he arrives in Norwich and the following week she visits Walford to try to persuade her father-in-law, Jules, to come and live with them following his mugging. Jules declines and says he is happy in the square.
