= Marge Green =

Fictional character from the BBC soap opera EastEnders

- EastEnders character
- Portrayed by: Pat Coombs
- Duration: 1989–1990
- First appearance: Episode 444; 9 May 1989
- Last appearance: Episode 523; 8 February 1990
- Introduced by: Mike Gibbon
In-universe information
- Occupation: Brown Owl; Cleaner
- Mother: Florence Green
- First cousins: Fred; Ada

Marge Green (credited as Brown Owl in her first appearance) is a fictional character from the BBC soap opera EastEnders, played by Pat Coombs. from 9 May 1989 to 8 February 1990. Introduced in 1989, elderly Marge is scripted as comical and timid. The character was one of many to be axed in 1990 when Michael Ferguson took over the role as executive producer from her introducer Mike Gibbon.

== Creation and development ==
Writer Colin Brake has suggested that 1989 was a year of big change for EastEnders, both behind the cameras and in front of them. Original production designer Keith Harris left the show, and co-creators Tony Holland and Julia Smith both decided that the time had come to move on too; their final contribution coincided with the exit of one of EastEnders' most successful characters, Den Watts (Leslie Grantham). Producer Mike Gibbon was given the task of running the show and he enlisted the most experienced writers to take over the storylining of the programme, including Charlie Humphreys, Jane Hollowood and Tony McHale.

According to Brake, the departure of two of the soap's most popular characters, Den and Angie Watts (Anita Dobson), had left a void in the programme, which needed to be filled. In addition, several other long-running characters left the show that year including two original cast members, Sue and Ali Osman (Sandy Ratcliff and Nejdet Salih) and their family; Donna Ludlow (Matilda Ziegler); Carmel Jackson (Judith Jacob) and Colin Russell (Michael Cashman). Brake has indicated that the production team decided that 1989 was to be a year of change in Walford, commenting, "it was almost as if Walford itself was making a fresh start".

At the time, the programme had come under criticism in the British media for being too depressing, and according to Brake, the programme makers were determined to change this. In 1989 there was a deliberate attempt to increase the lighter, more comic aspects of life in Albert Square. This led to the introduction of some characters who were deliberately conceived as comic or light-hearted. Such characters included Julie Cooper (Louise Plowright); Trevor Short (Phil McDermott), the "village idiot", and his friend, northern heartbreaker Paul Priestly (Mark Thrippleton); wheeler-dealer Vince Johnson (Hepburn Graham); Laurie Bates (Gary Powell), who became Pete Beale's (Peter Dean) sparring partner and Marge Green played by veteran comedy actress Pat Coombs.

Brake describes Marge as a "well-meaning, slightly batty older lady" who he said worked well in partnership with the much tougher older character Mo Butcher (Edna Doré). Marge has been described by author Hilary Kingsley as an innocent spinster "who yearns for love and deserves it." Referring to the character's role as Walford Brownie's Brown Owl, Kingsley says, "She was always more of a mouse than an owl, a funny, easily flustered frump who was scared of men and the modern world because she'd hidden away from both for most of her life [...] Poor Marge was put upon by her domineering [ninety]-three-year-old mother [...] Friendless, except for Tibby, her mother's cat [...]" Describing her backstory, Kingsley said, "In her youth, she was briefly engaged to a soldier but he married her best friend." Coombs, described by Kingsley as one of Britain's best comedy actresses, was already a known comedy actress in the UK and reportedly "relished" the role.

Brake suggests that humour was an important element in EastEnders' storylines during 1989, with a greater amount of slapstick and light comedy than ever before. He has classed 1989's changes as a brave experiment, and has suggested that while some found this period of EastEnders entertaining, many other viewers felt that the comedy stretched the programme's credibility somewhat. Although the programme still covered many issues in 1989, such as domestic violence, drugs, rape and racism, Brake reflected that the new emphasis on a more balanced mix between "light and heavy storylines" gave the illusion that the show had lost a "certain edge".

By the end of the year, EastEnders had acquired a new executive producer, Michael Ferguson, who had previously been a successful producer on ITV's The Bill. Brake has suggested that Ferguson was responsible for bringing in a new sense of vitality, and creating a programme that was more in touch with the real world than it had been over the last year. A new era began in 1990 with the introduction of the Mitchell brothers, Phil (Steve McFadden) and Grant (Ross Kemp), successful characters who would go on to dominate the soap thereafter. As the new production machine cleared the way for new characters and a new direction, a number of characters were axed from the show at the start of the year. Among them was Marge, as well as many other regular characters that had been introduced to the show in 1989. By March 1990, they had all gone. Brake has said that Pat Coombs was upset to be leaving the programme so soon, but with the show's new direction there was no place for characters "whose prime function was to be comic relief".

== Storylines ==
Marge is first seen in May 1989 as a friend of Dot Cotton (June Brown) and Ethel Skinner (Gretchen Franklin). Marge works at the Bed & Breakfast as a cleaner, first for (the unseen) Doris then for Pat Butcher (Pam St. Clement). When poor health forces Pauline Fowler (Wendy Richard) to give up working at the launderette, Marge works there in her place for a few months, but always succeeds in muddling up the service washes. Marge is an elderly spinster and as well as her day job cleaning she also holds the position of Brown Owl for the unruly Walford Brownies until Mo Butcher (Edna Doré) relieves her of her duties. Mo's tenure is brief, however, as she is sacked for lying about her age.

Marge is timid and a bit of a soft-touch and tends to be bossed around by the more domineering personalities on the square, such as her friend Mo. Marge lives at 93 Victoria Road and devotes her life to caring for her sickly 93-year-old mother, Florence Maisie Green. This is a massive strain on her, particularly when her mother's health suddenly deteriorates after a second stroke in December 1989. Noticing that Marge is becoming exhausted with the palliative care of her mother, her friends, Dot, Ethel and Mo, take her on holiday to Clacton where they all take part in a dancing competition. Marge attracts the attention of a senior bachelor, Mr Conroy, but she has led a sheltered life and is too shy to allow the romance to develop. Nevertheless, Mr Conroy persists and ends up proposing, which Marge regretfully turns down because of her commitment to her mother. Soon after, however, Marge receives news that her mother has died and she subsequently decides to accept Mr Conroy's proposal. Unfortunately for Marge, he has already departed, so she returns to Walford alone.

Although Marge is devastated to lose her mother, her friends help her through it and she eventually comes to look forward to a future where she can concentrate on her own needs instead of caring for others. However, the following year, Marge's cousin Fred (Richard Addison) arrives in Walford and cons her into becoming his invalid mother's companion on a cruise ship. Despite Mo warning her against it, Marge feels obligated to care for her sick relative and in February 1990, she leaves Walford.

== Reception ==
According to Brake, the storyline involving Marge and the unruly Brownies was intended to be fun, but references to Brownies behaving badly caused great offence to the Brownie movement, and an official complaint was made and upheld. The broadcasting commission said the EastEnders Brownie episodes "came near to parody," were unfair to the Brownies and harmed the Girl Guides' image. The BBC had to make a public apology for the misinterpretation of the movement. Brake has suggested that the mishap was a "salutary lesson to those [...] in the script department to be very vigilant in ensuring, as far as possible, that no group or individual was offended by an unintentional slight in a script." In 2023, Graham McCann from Comedy.co.uk called Marge "predictably downtrodden, timid and mechanically-written" and believed that she brought "much-needed humour to that self-consciously sombre soap". McCann also revealed that Marge was noticeably popular with critics and viewers, with one reviewer believing that Marge was "the only character worth watching".
