= Mo Butcher =

Fictional character from the BBC soap opera EastEnders

- EastEnders character
- Portrayed by: Edna Doré
- Duration: 1988–1990
- First appearance: Episode 373; 1 September 1988
- Last appearance: Episode 607; 29 November 1990
- Introduced by: Julia Smith
In-universe information
- Brothers: Sidney
- Husband: George Butcher (backstory)
- Sons: Frank Butcher
- Daughters: Joan Garwood
- Grandsons: Ricky Butcher; Danny
- Granddaughters: Clare Butcher; Diane Butcher; Janine Butcher

Mo Butcher is a fictional character from the BBC soap opera EastEnders, played by Edna Doré between 1988 and 1990. She is introduced as the matriarch figure of the Butcher family, Frank Butcher's (Mike Reid) elderly mother. She is portrayed as a battle-axe, tough and interfering. Her most notable storyline first aired in 1990, when the character is used to portray descent into Alzheimer's disease. Doré opted to leave the serial that same year; Mo was written out of the soap making her last appearance in November. Mo was killed off in 1992, but her death was off-screen.

== Creation and development ==
1988 was a year of change on-screen in EastEnders. Since the show's inception in 1985 and up until 1988, one of the soap's main focal points, The Queen Victoria (The Vic) public house, had been inhabited by the Watts family; however, actors Leslie Grantham and Anita Dobson who played landlords Den and Angie Watts resigned in 1988, meaning the soap's bosses had to find a new family to inhabit the Vic. Pat Wicks (Pam St Clement) and her boyfriend Frank Butcher (Mike Reid) were instilled as the new landlords, and along with Frank came his family, including his mother Mo (Edna Doré), who moved to Walford in September.

Mo was portrayed as a battle-axe. Author Hilary Kingsley has described Mo as a "tough, interfering busybody with a will of iron and a face of stone [...] To her grandchildren she was always indulgent, but to Frank she was always the boss, a woman with a whim or iron." Kingsley surmised that "only slowly did Walford begin to see a softer side to hard bitten old Mo". Kingsley described Mo as a woman who sought status, suggesting that she wished to be "Queen Bee" when she moved to Walford and regarded Frank's new wife Pat as "nothing more than a pushy interloper". Initial storylines centred upon clashes between Pat and Mo, with Frank trying to find a compromise between the bickering women in his life. Kingsley has commented that "gradually some sort of compromise was worked out and slowly Mo became more human."

In 1990, a topical storyline was aired in which Mo was given Alzheimer's disease. During the year, Mo was shown to grow increasingly more forgetful, and after tests, Frank was informed that Mo was suffering with dementia. The storyline was scripted to show the effects on a family when a parent or loved one with Alzheimer's. By November that year, Mo was in advanced stages of mental deterioration. It was at this stage that the character was written out of EastEnders, Edna Doré having decided to end her contract. On-screen, Mo was sent to live with her daughter in Colchester, having convinced herself that Frank wanted to kill her. Writer Colin Brake has suggested that the storyline had to be curtailed earlier than they would have liked due to Doré's desire to leave.

Commenting on her time in the soap and the reasons for her departure in 1999, Doré said, "I shall always be grateful to EastEnders. It gave me recognition. It was a marvellous opportunity to be known everywhere, although it totally changes your life. For a while I couldn't even go shopping without being stopped. But compared with the theatre or film it was lacking in job satisfaction because it was so quick. I did it for a couple of years. I didn't want to stay so long that I wouldn't be considered for other parts."

Mo was killed off-screen in 1992, succumbing to Alzheimer's; her death was confirmed on-screen in the New Year's Eve episode of 1992. Doré was at a New Year's Eve party when she discovered her character's fate. She commented in 2001, "I was at a New Year's Eve party when someone came up to me and said, 'Have you seen, you've been killed off?' And I heaved a sigh of relief and had another drink. Still I can't complain. I had a good time at EastEnders and the one advantage of having been in a soap is that I get far better paid for my roles now."

== Storylines ==
=== Backstory ===
Mo was born in Walthamstow in 1921. During her teenage years she married Chike Butcher who worked for London Transport. Chike got promoted to transport inspector at the age of forty-five, and Mo felt she had achieved status. They had two children, Frank (Mike Reid) and Joan (Mary Miller). Following Chike's death, Mo never remarried; she busied herself with caring for Frank's children, particularly when their mother June died in 1987.

=== 1988–1990 ===
Mo moves to Albert Square in September 1988 to be near Frank and his family. She disapproves of the way Frank is raising his teenage children Ricky (Sid Owen) and Diane (Sophie Lawrence) and immediately clashes with his fiancée Pat Wicks (Pam St Clement), bringing up her past reputation as a prostitute and threatening to put a halt to their impending marriage. During her time in Walford Mo has an array of jobs; she first works in the kitchens of The Queen Victoria, then on Arthur Fowler's (Bill Treacher) fruit and veg stall and then in Ali Osman's (Nejdet Salih) café. However all her jobs come to an end due to her interference, causing her employers no end of grief.

Fiercely loyal to her family, Mo sticks by her son through his financial woes and tries her best to help him out by offering Frank her late husband Chike's life insurance money. She is shown to be extremely fond of her favourite grandchild Janine (Rebecca Michael) and takes a hand in persuading Frank to bring her to Walford to live with him in 1989 (Janine had previously been living with Frank's eldest daughter Clare outside Walford). Despite being protective and doting on her family, Mo is not blinkered to their faults, even in a rare moment supporting Pat in her decision to put Janine in therapy when her behaviour becomes out of control. Mo eventually warms to Pat, seeing that Frank does love her, and arranges for them to be married in great East End style, complete with a horse and carriage, Pearly Kings, a street party and jellied eels.

Her busybody attitude results in few friendships in Walford for Mo, but she becomes close to Marge Green (Pat Coombs), despite belittling her. Together they participate in the Walford Brownies, but Mo (a Brown Owl) is sacked for lying about her age. She also takes on the local council over the proposed closure of the community centre.

In 1990, she becomes increasingly forgetful, and is eventually diagnosed with Alzheimer's disease after flooding the B&B, setting fire to the house, and planning to visit her brother Sidney in Bexleyheath (having forgotten that Sidney had died years previously). Frank feels unable to look after her, and sent her to live with his sister Joan, who looks after Mo in Colchester until her death on New Year's Eve 1992.

== Reception ==
Edna Doré's portrayal of Mo's descent into Alzheimer's has been described as "deeply moving" by John Millar of the Daily Record. Former executive producer of EastEnders, Michael Ferguson, has suggested that Mo having Alzheimer's in 1990 gave people permission to talk about an illness "that had been almost too distressing to discuss in public before." He alleged that viewers informed him that EastEnders had given them a shorthand "like Mo" to discuss Alzheimer's.

According to writer Colin Brake, the storyline involving Mo and the unruly Brownies was intended to be fun, but references to Brownies behaving badly caused great offence to the Brownie movement, and an official complaint was made and upheld. The broadcasting commission said the EastEnders Brownie episodes "came near to parody," were unfair to the Brownies and harmed the Girl Guides' image. The BBC had to make a public apology for the misinterpretation of the movement. Brake has suggested that the mishap was a "salutary lesson to those [...] in the script department to be very vigilant in ensuring, as far as possible, that no group or individual was offended by an unintentional slight in a script."
