= John Royle =

John Royle may refer to:

- John Royle (EastEnders), a character in the soap opera EastEnders
- John Forbes Royle (1799–1858), British botanist and teacher of materia medica
