= Jules Tavernier =

Jules Tavernier may refer to:

- Jules Tavernier (painter) (1844–1889), French painter
- Jules Tavernier (EastEnders), fictional character
