= Diane Butcher =

Fictional character from EastEnders

- EastEnders character
- Portrayed by: Sophie Lawrence
- Duration: 1988–1991, 1993–1994, 1997, 2008, 2012
- First appearance: Episode 341; 12 May 1988
- Last appearance: Episode 4452; 29 June 2012
- Introduced by: Julia Smith (1988); Leonard Lewis (1993); Barbara Emile (1994); Jane Harris (1997); Diederick Santer (2008); Bryan Kirkwood (2012)
In-universe information
- Occupation: Nurse
- Father: Frank Butcher
- Mother: June Butcher
- Stepmother: Pat Butcher; Peggy Mitchell
- Brothers: Ricky Butcher
- Sisters: Clare Butcher; Janine Butcher
- Half-brothers: Danny
- Sons: Jacques Butcher
- Grandmothers: Mo Butcher; Lydia Simmonds
- Uncles: Norman Simmonds
- Aunts: Joan Garwood
- Nephews: Liam Butcher
- Nieces: Tiffany Butcher; Scarlett Butcher

Diane Butcher is a fictional character from the BBC soap opera EastEnders, played by Sophie Lawrence. Diane appeared as a regular character between 1988 and 1991, when Lawrence decided to leave. The character made several brief returns in 1993, 1994, and 1997. In 2008, she returned for her father Frank Butcher's (Mike Reid) funeral, and on 20 June 2012 she returned for her sister Janine Butcher's (Charlie Brooks) wedding, departing on 29 June 2012.

Over the years, Diane develops from a rebellious teenager who runs away from home, to a free-spirited single mother having difficulty looking after her young son. More recently, a more-mature Diane settled in France and, in a departure from a character previously depicted as heterosexual, she is stated to be in a long-term relationship with another woman.

== Creation and development ==
=== Background and casting ===
EastEnders had been on air for three years before the character of Diane made her first screen appearance in May 1988. At the time, big changes were occurring "behind-the-scenes". Co-creator Julia Smith took "a more back-seat role" as Series Producer, which allowed producer Mike Gibbon to take control of the making of the programme.

The arrival of the Butcher family in May 1988 signified an end of an era for the soap, as Den and Angie Watts (Leslie Grantham and Anita Dobson) vacated their positions as landlord and landlady of The Queen Victoria public house, leaving Frank (Mike Reid), and his girlfriend Pat Wicks (Pam St. Clement) to take over tenancy. Ricky (Sid Owen) and Diane, played by Sophie Lawrence, Frank's teenage children came with Frank. Lawrence was 15 at the time, and she got the part in EastEnders straight after leaving stage school. Lawrence has commented, "I always just thought that I would be a dancer and go into a West End musical and that I would be very, very happy. Then I got EastEnders when I was 15 and it kind of changed my life."

=== Personality ===
Diane as she appeared in 1989

Diane has been described as "dreamy" and someone who "was always destined for more romantic things than the reality of Walford." "Sensitive and artistic", for a time Diane was portrayed as the least troublesome of the Butcher family, the one who conformed the most, though she began to rebel against her father's heavy-handed paternalism.

EastEnders writer Sarah Phelps has described the character as sharp, smart with elements of her mother in her. Phelps adds "she had a sharp tongue and a quick mind...you could see her looking at her family and looking at Walford...and thinking 'this ain't for me'." Sophie Lawrence has said, "Diane was a bit of a wild child...she was a bit naughty, she was always in trouble. I think it was something to do with losing her mother at an early age...She ran away [from home] to make a statement. I think it was a 'notice me' kind of thing. It worked."

In the 2008 television documentary EastEnders: Ricky and Bianca, Diane was described as "rather normal" for a member of the Butcher family. Upon her return in 2008, the character had altered and matured. Lawrence has commented, "coming back, she seems quite nice actually, she seem more relaxed. She's so much older I suppose, so she's sort of grown up really. She seems nice and kind and settled with her life."

=== Teenage runaway ===
The most notable storyline featuring Diane during her initial stint on the soap concerned the character running away from home in 1990. In the on-screen events, Diane was shown to be increasingly unhappy towards the latter part of 1989, exacerbated by the sudden departure of her boyfriend Paul Priestly (Mark Thrippleton). Diane decided to run away from home in January 1990 when it seemed her family had forgotten her 16th birthday—they were actually planning a surprise party for her that she never got to see. Diane's disappearance dominated the programme in the beginning of 1990. Focus was placed upon the effect her departure had on the Butcher family, in particular her father Frank who searched unsuccessfully for his missing daughter.

When the storyline had originally been scripted in 1989, it was left open-ended, meaning that none of the writers or producers of EastEnders had decided whether Diane would ever be found. However, towards the end of 1989, EastEnders acquired a new executive producer, Michael Ferguson, and according to scriptwriter Colin Brake, one of his first decisions was that "Diane must be found". The subsequent story of her returning home and adjusting to life back in Walford was developed.

Diane contacts her father Frank after being missing for three months. He collects her at King's Cross station (1990).

The episodes where Diane returned home aired towards the end of March 1990. They were written by Tony McHale and directed by Mike Barnes. The episodes have been described as "extraordinary" and a "radical departure from the normal EastEnders form", because they used flashbacks to tell the story of Diane's three months living on the streets of London as a homeless girl. Simultaneously, they also told the present story of Frank finding Diane, and bringing her back to Walford. Colin Brake has described them as powerful episodes, which "returned EastEnders to the tradition of gritty realism that had been integral to the early episodes." In the flashbacks, it was revealed that Diane had lived rough on the streets and joined a gang of runaways, befriending a young girl named Disa O'Brien (Jan Graveson). Diane also became involved with an artist named Matthew Taylor, who took nude photos of her and then constructed a life-size sculpture of her, which later turned up in Albert Square, enraging Frank. This ignited Diane's own interest in art, which was demonstrated later in the year when she painted a mural on the side of the Butcher household. Actress Sophie Lawrence did research for the storyline among real homeless people.

=== Departure ===
Subsequent storylines featuring Diane included involvement in the plight of pregnant runaway Disa, whom Diane brought back to Walford to bond with her baby—Disa had initially abandoned the baby on Diane's doorstep on Christmas Day 1990. The bulk of the character's narrative concerned a blossoming romance with one of EastEnders' original characters, Mark Fowler (Todd Carty), who returned to the serial as a regular character in 1990 after a three-year absence. The relationship was never consummated however, because in January 1991 Mark revealed to Diane that he was HIV positive—he was the first mainstream soap opera character to be diagnosed. The episode, written by Tony McHale, has been described as the "important" beginning to Mark's HIV storyline, as Mark's secret HIV status was finally revealed to the audience as well as Diane. In the on-screen events, Diane tried to be supportive to Mark and persuaded him to have counselling at the Terrence Higgins Trust, though their relationship was never quite the same again; when Mark, prompted by his mother Pauline (Wendy Richard), asked Diane to marry him, she turned him down and left the serial to move to France shortly after.

Off-screen Sophie Lawrence had decided to quit the soap to take on new projects, which included an attempt at a music career. She has commented, "I left because I wanted to play something different. In doing that, you have to grow out of the public's perception of you as an EastEnders character. But I wanted variety of roles. I felt I couldn't just carry on being Diane indefinitely. I wanted to be an actor, not just a personality."

=== Brief returns ===
The character has made numerous brief returns to the serial as a guest character. In 1993, she was featured in a special week of episodes, filmed on-location in Paris, France, where Frank discovered, to his horror, that Diane was pregnant with an unknown foreign man's baby. In June 1994, Diane returned to Walford as part of a storyline involving her father's disappearance. In 1997, another week's worth of episodes set in Paris reunited Ricky and Diane. Shortly after, the character returned to the soap's setting of Walford, but Lawrence reportedly quit weeks after making her comeback. She had since commented on her reasons for quitting so soon: "Going back to EastEnders was like going back to school and none of your friends are there. I was [originally] there with people like Nick Berry (Simon Wicks) and Letitia Dean (Sharon Watts) and they'd all gone. One of the young actors, who will remain nameless, made me a coffee and started telling me all about what it was like. He had no idea I'd been in the soap before." In addition, Lawrence was suffering physically as she was still getting over injuries she sustained from a car accident and was forced to remove a neck brace for filming purposes. On-screen, the character departed to travel with her musician boyfriend, abandoning her young son in her brother's care. Bosses at EastEnders had reportedly been keen for Lawrence to remain on the show, as they were hoping for an on-screen reunion of the Butcher family; Mike Reid had agreed to reprise his role as Frank, though Diane departed before his reintroduction.

Despite claiming that she would never return to EastEnders in 1997, Lawrence was upset when she discovered that both Sid Owen and Mike Reid (Ricky and Frank) were leaving EastEnders in 2000 as, in her opinion, it ruled out any chance of her character returning to the show. She commented, "It would be great fun to get all the Butcher clan back for a few months. I hear Diane's name mentioned quite a lot on the show — it makes me feel like I've never really left. But all the people I'm connected with are leaving, which makes going back harder and I'm really sorry about that. It would be great to have the Butcher clan come back for Mike's sendoff. But, sadly, I don't think there is the space for me to go back full-time." In 2002, she was asked if she would ever return to the soap and she responded, "If they asked me, I’d love to go back. Not on a long term contract or anything because I love doing other things but I’d definitely like to go back."

The character reappeared in March 2008. Sophie Lawrence was asked to reprise the role by executive producer Diederick Santer as part of a storyline that has been dubbed "Frank Week". Mike Reid died in 2007 and due to the popularity of the character he played, Santer decided that Frank would also be killed off in the serial. A funeral was held for the character as a tribute to both the actor and the "iconic" character he played. Lawrence was one of several actors brought back to the show especially for the storyline. She was joined by Charlie Brooks, who played her younger sister Janine and Sid Owen as her brother Ricky.

Commenting to Digital Spy about her return, Lawrence said: "I've not been in the show for 11 years and it's not like I've ever thought "I'll never go back", you just think that your chance to go back has gone. It never crossed my mind that the occasion would ever arise, so when I got the phone call, it was really odd. There was never any doubt that I'd do it for Mike [Reid] and it's not something that's really been done — I don't think someone's ever died off-screen and then they've done the funeral on-screen. I think everyone was quite wary because it's quite an odd thing to do to have attended his real funeral and then go back to film it all over again. There was some trepidation about how it was going to work. But as soon as we arrived, it was like 11 years of your life had been wiped out and you'd been there the day before [...] I had this really lovely scene with Sid [Owen] where I said: "Isn't it strange, you imagine you’d come back and everything would be here waiting for us just like it was." Diane's saying everything's moved on, but for me it was the opposite, I'd got back there and everything was the same."

The character was brought back for a period of four episodes. Lawrence has revealed that she thought she would have minimal involvement in the storyline and was surprised at how much dialogue she was given. Each of the returning characters were given their own storyline; in Diane's case, she was in a relationship with a female doctor named Suzanne. Lawrence commented, "I think [Diane]'s quite alright now—she's come back and she's sorted. She knows the score." When asked if she would ever make a full-time return, Lawrence said, "Once you're re-established, you're a character that other characters can go and visit. For example, after Diane's left Walford again, Pat goes to stay with her for a couple of weeks. So there's no reason why I couldn't return for a two-week 'holiday' to see the kids!" She made another on-screen return on 20 June 2012 and departed on 29 June.

== Storylines ==
=== 1988–1991 ===
Diane arrives in Albert Square in 1988 as the daughter of second-hand car salesman Frank Butcher (Mike Reid) and sister to Ricky Butcher (Sid Owen). Her mother June died in 1987, and when her father marries Pat Wicks (Pam St. Clement) and he becomes the landlord of The Queen Victoria public house, she lives with them there. Later the family move out of the pub to run a bed and breakfast in Albert Square.

She then falls for the Butchers' lodger Paul Priestly (Mark Thrippleton) in 1989, much to Frank's annoyance. Diane takes the relationship more seriously than Paul, and she is devastated when he finishes with her to begin a fling with hairdresser Julie Cooper (Louise Plowright). Paul and Julie do not last, and he immediately returns to Diane. Scorned, Diane cannot forgive Julie for taking Paul, and she plays various vengeful tricks on her as payback, such as sabotaging her salon's opening day and sending her a male escort to make her look desperate. Julie responds by flirting with Paul to infuriate Diane further, and their feud culminates in a showdown in The Queen Vic one night, at which Julie humiliates Diane. Paul quickly loses interest in Diane. Ignoring his reticence, Diane convinces herself that Paul is contemplating proposing marriage to her, so she is broken-hearted when he returns to his hometown in Leeds in December 1989; he leaves without saying goodbye.

Feeling misunderstood and unloved after believing that her family have forgotten her 16th birthday, Diane runs away from home in January 1990 and joins the down-and-outs on the streets of London. She is fast looked after by teenager Disa O'Brien (Jan Graveson) who takes her under her wing, showing her how to survive. Disa turns to prostitution for extra money, and Diane poses naked for photographs for a man named Matthew Taylor (Neil Phillips) who makes a sculpture of her. She eventually returns to Albert Square in March 1990, after her father has been searching for months, but she struggles to adjust to life back in Walford. As a result of her time away, Diane develops an interest in art. When Taylor turns up trying to woo Diane, he deposits a life-size sculpute of her in Albert Square. Livid, Frank destroys the statue and confronts Taylor, further alienating Diane.

Diane develops a friendship with Mark Fowler (Todd Carty) when he returns to his family home in 1990, and enlists his help to find Disa, who is heavily pregnant and living in "Cardboard City". Disa refuses their help initially; after she gives birth, she abandons the child on Diane's doorstep on Christmas Day. Diane and Mark care for the baby in secret until they find Disa and persuade her to come home with them. Diane takes care of them and attempts to help Disa bond with her child.

Diane is keen for her relationship with Mark to progress, so his hesitance upsets her. Eventually he confesses that he is HIV-positive. She pledges to stick with him although the task is daunting. She acts as a confidante, helping him to face up to his illness and seek counselling and professional help. Diane is unsettled when Mark begins spending time with his HIV+ ex-girlfriend Gill (Susanna Dawson), and when Mark proposes to Diane in June 1991, she gently turns him down. The following month she leaves Walford to go on a fruit-picking holiday in France. She telephones Frank in September to say she will not be returning.

=== 1993–2012 ===
Frank visits Diane in France in 1993. He is horrified to discover she is pregnant and unsure who the father is. After a heated argument Frank storms off, refusing to speak to Diane, but they manage to make peace by the time Frank leaves—Diane drives to the ferry and tearfully waves Frank goodbye. Diane returns for a short stint in 1994 to inform Pat that Frank is alive and well and has left from Walford following a mental breakdown—Frank had visited Diane off-screen in France.

Ricky visits Diane in France in 1997, spending time with her young son Jacques. Diane is in a tempestuous relationship with a Cameroonian musician named Thomas (Robbie Gee), and when this abruptly ends, she and son Jacques turn up in Walford, looking for a place to stay. However a short time later, Thomas visits Diane and asks her to go travelling with him on tour in Africa. Diane goes without informing anyone, leaving Jacques with Ricky and his wife Bianca (Patsy Palmer). Pregnant Bianca struggles to care for Jacques, and even considers having an abortion as a result. Jacques is sent to live in Manchester with Diane's sister Clare (Lucy Foxell), until Diane retrieves him to live with her in Paris.

In 2008, Frank dies of cancer at Diane's home in Paris, requesting that his funeral be held in Walford. Diane returns on 31 March 2008 with Ricky, where they convey the news of Frank's death to his former wives Pat and Peggy Mitchell (Barbara Windsor). The following day, Diane is glad to see her sister Janine (Charlie Brooks) back for Frank's funeral. During a conversation with Janine, Diane reveals she has been in a relationship with a woman called Suzanne for three years. At Frank's wake in the Queen Vic, Diane is approached by Ian Beale (Adam Woodyatt) to speak about her experience of running away as a teenager, believing her insight might help him find his own missing daughter, Lucy Beale (Melissa Suffield). Frank leaves individual gifts to each of his children. Diane receives some of her old school paintings and drawings. Diane helps Ricky, Janine, and Pat scatter Frank's ashes in the flowerbeds of the Square before departing.

Four years later, Diane returns to Walford to attend Janine's wedding to Michael Moon (Steve John Shepherd). She comforts Janine when Michael is questioned over allegations of fraud before arranging a hen party for her that evening. It is mentioned that Diane is still with Suzanne. She later acts as Janine's maid of honour at her wedding and escorts her to hospital after she goes into premature labour. The day after the birth of her niece Scarlett, she helps the initially-reluctant Janine produce her first breast milk. Diane stays for a week after Scarlett's birth until Janine tells her and Ricky that they should return to their own lives. Diane agrees and tells Ricky that she cannot leave Jacques on his own. Diane stays for Scarlett's christening at the hospital then returns to France. Following Michael's murder and Janine's arrest, Diane becomes Scarlett's guardian. In 2021, Janine reveals that her and Diane are not on speaking terms.

== Reception ==
In reference to Diane's return to the soap in 2008 for Frank's funeral, Paul English from the Daily Record accused EastEnders of using actor Mike Reid's real death as "an opportunity to reintroduce some popular old faces. Boiled down, it's cashing in on the dead - but it's how Frank might have done it himself."

== See also ==
- List of LGBT characters in television and radio
