= Paddy Joyce =

British actor (1923–2000)

- Born: Patrizio Francis Schaurek; 31 May 1923; Trieste, Italy
- Died: 27 July 2000 (aged 77); London, England
- Occupation: Actor
- Years active: 1953–2000

Patrick Francis Joyce (born Patrizio Francis Schaurek; 31 May 1923 – 27 July 2000) was a British actor in film and television. He appeared in nearly 90 film and television productions, and is known for his role as Tommy Deakin in the British soap opera Coronation Street and John Royle in EastEnders.

== Early life ==
Joyce was born in the port city of Trieste, Italy. His father was Frantisek Schaurek, a Czech banker who had stolen money from the Živnostenská Bank in Trieste where he worked. His mother was Eileen Schaurek (née Joyce), the younger sister of the author James Joyce. Joyce had two sisters, Nora and Bozena. In 1926, his father committed suicide, and in February 1928, his mother returned to Ireland with Joyce and his two elder sisters.

On returning to Ireland, the family lived in Mountjoy Square, Dublin and Joyce attended Belvedere College. At school, he acted in Gilbert and Sullivan operas, including The Gondoliers and The Mikado.

After leaving school, Joyce formed a harmony quartet, Four Dots and a Dash, subsequently renamed the Four Ramblers. He was also part of a trio named the Humoresques, which toured Canada in the late 1940s with George Formby.

== Career ==
As an actor, Joyce used his mother's maiden name, rather than his birth surname, to avoid being typecast in central European roles. In the early 1960s, he appeared on stage in Fings Ain't Wot They Used T'be.

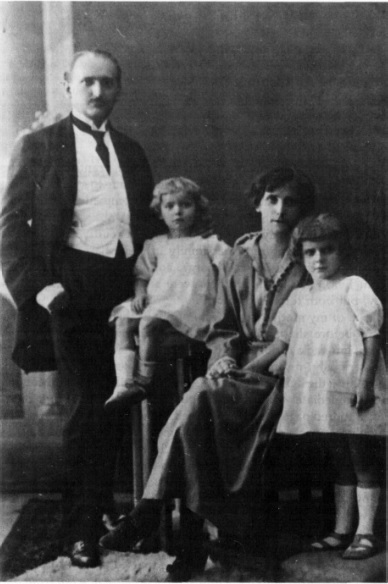
Schaurek family; Frantisek, Nora, Eileen (James Joyce's sister) and Bozena

Joyce's screen debut was in the 1953 film The Cruel Sea, although his role in the film was uncredited. Throughout the 1950s, he appeared in films including The Girl in the Picture, The Steel Bayonet, Dublin Nightmare and Cover Girl Killer. He played a soldier in the 1969 film, Oh! What a Lovely War. In the 1960s his television roles began to become more and more frequent with appearances in shows including The Adventures of Robin Hood, No Hiding Place and The Revenue Men. Joyce had become widely recognised within the UK; however, he also appeared in several plays made for Telefís Éireann, in Ireland.

Between 1968 and 1974, he played rag-and-bone man Tommy Deakin in Coronation Street. In 1973, he appeared in two episodes of Crown Court and the film version of Never Mind the Quality Feel the Width; and between 1964 and 1976 he appeared in many different roles in the police procedural drama Z-Cars. In 1980, Joyce appeared in an episode of The Enigma Files (The Fit Up), and throughout the 1980s he appeared in television shows including Minder, Auf Wiedersehen, Pet and The Bill.

In his later years Joyce played John Royle, father of publican Eddie Royle, in the soap opera EastEnders between 1990 and 1991, and again in 1993. His final credited performance was in the 1999 film Alice in Wonderland.

== Personal life and death ==
Joyce lived in Muswell Hill, north London. He married a Canadian, Dorothy, and had two children.

He died of a stroke in London on 27 July 2000, at the age of 77.
