= Brown Owl (disambiguation) =

Brown Owl is a synonym for the tawny owl. It may also refer to:

- a title often given to the adult pack leader in Girlguiding UK
- Brown Owl, New Zealand, a suburb of Upper Hutt, New Zealand
