= Corinne Hollingworth =

British television producer and executive

- Born: Corinne Ann Hollingworth; 25 May 1952 (age 73); England, United Kingdom
- Occupation: TV Producer
- Years active: 1980–2008
- Television: EastEnders; Family Affairs

Corinne Ann Hollingworth (born 25 May 1952) is a British television producer and executive, best known for her contributions to British soap operas, including BBC's EastEnders and five's Family Affairs. Hollingworth has gained a reputation for winning huge drama audiences by concentrating on human interest storylines.

== Early life ==
She attended the Sherwood Hall School for Girls in Mansfield, a grammar-technical school (now the Samworth Church Academy).

== Career ==
In 1980 Hollingworth worked as an assistant floor manager on the BBC's televised adaptation of Pride and Prejudice. She gradually worked her way up the BBC ladder, she was Production Manager or 1st Assistant Director on a number of Doctor Who series produced by John Nathan-Turner. She began producing for the BBC in the latter part of 1989, contributing to the BBC soap opera EastEnders initially as a production associate and later as an associate producer, under then producer Mike Gibbon. She later became co-producer, with Richard Bramall, under new executive producer, Michael Ferguson in 1990. Following Ferguson's departure, she became co-producer with Pat Sandys, formerly of ITV's The Bill.

After leaving EastEnders at the end of 1991 she began working on the BBC's ill-fated soap Eldorado (1992–1993) — for which she was the series producer following Julia Smith. Hollingworth was brought in to turn the soap around following declining ratings and heavy media criticism, but despite adding a million viewers the soap was eventually axed by the BBC controller, Alan Yentob, in 1993.

She went on to produce for the popular medical drama Casualty (1994–1996), pushing up viewing figures to almost 18 million by switching the focus to the love lives of the characters. The changes she implemented were popular with viewers. However, they were less popular with some of the cast members, in particular Derek Thompson, who plays the long-running character Charlie Fairhead. Thompson believed the show had become "like a mindless soap opera" and was in danger of losing the edge that had made it one of the most controversial programmes on television. He revealed that he nearly quit the role in protest, but decided to remain when he discovered that Hollingworth was leaving the show in 1996.

In addition to producing for Casualty, Hollingworth returned to EastEnders from 1995 to 1996 as the programme's executive producer, taking over from Barbara Emile and eventually replaced by Jane Harris. At EastEnders she was responsible for storylines such as Michelle Fowler falling pregnant to her nemesis Grant Mitchell; and Ricky Butcher's love triangle with his wife Sam and girlfriend Bianca Jackson. Hollingworth's contributions to the soap were awarded in 1997 when EastEnders won the BAFTA for "Best Drama Series." Hollingworth shared the award with producer Jane Harris.

She left the BBC in 1996 to become the controller of drama for Britain's fifth terrestrial channel, five. Her defection was one of several high-level "poachings" from the BBC by Dawn Airey, Channel 5's director of programmes. Hollingworth, along with Mal Young, were the co-creators of the channel's flagship soap opera, Family Affairs, for which she was also the executive producer.

She left five in 2003 and in 2004 she moved to ITV to become the Head of Continuing Series, taking over from Antony Wood. Her remit covered a wide range of shows including soaps and returning series such as Bad Girls, Footballers Wives, Taggart, Where the Heart Is, Fat Friends, The Bill, Heartbeat and The Royal. She left this position in March 2008.

Media offices
Preceded by Barbara Emile	Executive Producer of EastEnders; 20 February 1995 – 4 July 1996	Succeeded by Jane Harris
