= Sophie Lawrence =

English actress and singer (born 1972)

- Born: 12 June 1972 (age 54); Ilford, London, England
- Occupations: Actress, singer

Sophie Lawrence (born 12 June 1972, Ilford, London) is an English actress and singer. She played the role of Diane Butcher in the BBC soap opera EastEnders as a regular cast member from 1988 to 1991, making subsequent guest appearances in 1993, 1994, 1997, 2008 and 2012. In 1991, Lawrence achieved a top 30 hit in the UK single's chart with her cover of Donna Summer's hit single "Love's Unkind". Since 2001, she has been most active on stage in musical theatre and pantomime.

== Career ==
Lawrence initially trained to be a dancer, but after tearing a muscle in her groin she was forced to give it up and she turned to acting instead. She trained at the Sylvia Young Theatre School and during this time she secured her first acting role when she made on/off appearances in BBC's Grange Hill.

=== EastEnders ===
After graduating from drama school in 1988 at the age of 15, Lawrence was instantly cast as Diane Butcher, the daughter of Frank Butcher (Mike Reid), in the BBC soap opera EastEnders. She remained in the role until 1991 Lawrence commented, "I left because I wanted to play something different. In doing that, you have to grow out of the public's perception of you as an EastEnders character. But I wanted variety of roles. I felt I couldn't just carry on being Diane indefinitely. I wanted to be an actor, not just a personality."

Lawrence returned for several stints in 1993, 1994 and 1997. Lawrence left weeks after making her comeback in 1997 and she had since commented: "Going back to EastEnders was like going back to school and none of your friends are there. I was [originally] there with people like Nick Berry (Simon Wicks) and Letitia Dean (Sharon Watts) and they'd all gone. One of the young actors, who will remain nameless, made me a coffee and started telling me all about what it was like. He had no idea I'd been in the soap before." Bosses at EastEnders had reportedly been keen for Lawrence to remain on the cast, as they were hoping for an on-screen reunion of the Butcher family; Mike Reid had agreed to reprise his role as Frank, though Diane departed before his reintroduction.

Lawrence agreed to reprise the role of Diane once again in 2008 to film the screen funeral of Diane's father Frank, following the off-screen death of Mike Reid. She agreed to return for another brief stint in 2012.

=== Singing ===
Lawrence initially left her role in EastEnders to launch a pop career. She enjoyed minor chart success in 1991, when her cover of Donna Summer's 1977 hit "Love's Unkind" (produced by Pete Hammond with Nigel Wright for Simon Cowell's IQ Records) reached No. 21 in the UK Singles Chart. Lawrence worked with the successful pop writers and producers, Stock Aitken and Waterman, recording a follow-up single, "Secrets", a track taken from Kylie Minogue's Rhythm of Love album. However, the single was withdrawn before its release. Her pop career stalled and she returned to acting.

=== Other work ===
Lawrence's other notable television credits include the German TV adaptation of Die Wächter (1985), the TV movie The Little Match Girl (1986) starring Twiggy and Roger Daltrey, Cadfael (1994) with Derek Jacobi, and playing Neil Morrissey's girlfriend in the BBC sitcom Men Behaving Badly (1995). She also appeared in an episode of the game show Banzai, in which her task was to answer a ringing telephone after first escaping from a chair to which she had been tied. She played Miss Thing in the children's TV show Timmy Towers with Timmy Mallett. As well as acting, she also tried her hand at presenting on the children's television show Going Live!.

In theatre, Lawrence has played Janet in the West End's adaptation of The Rocky Horror Show and was also a lead in Daisy Pulls It Off. She has appeared in many touring plays, most notably in Alan Bennett's one-woman show Talking Heads.

Lawrence began her association with the hit 1970s musical Boogie Nights in 2001 and played the leading female, Debs, on two major tours. She also starred in the sequel Boogie Nights 2 – This Time It's The 80s, alongside David Essex, which did a nationwide tour in 2004 and 2005. Additionally, Lawrence was the Assistant Director of Boogie Nights. She has directed and choreographed several pantomimes and musicals.

In December 2006, Lawrence starred as Peter Pan (opposite Nigel Havers's Captain Hook) at the Wycombe Swan and in 2007 opposite David Essex again as Peter Pan at the Derngate in Northampton. She was also involved in the touring show, Simply Ballroom, as one of the presenters.
