= Michael Melia =

British actor (born 1945)

- Born: 25 July 1945 (age 80); Berkshire, England
- Occupation: Actor
- Notable work: EastEnders; Doctor Who
- Children: 2

Michael Melia (born 25 July 1945) is a British actor best known for his work on television. He appeared as Queen Vic landlord Eddie Royle in BBC One soap opera EastEnders between 1990 and 1991.

He lives in Hampton Wick, Surrey with his wife, Celia. They have two children, Tom and Charlotte, who have both appeared as extras in the EastEnders market square.

== Early life ==
Melia was born in Berkshire and attended St Mary's College, Strawberry Hill, the oldest Roman Catholic college in England. Before taking up acting he was a teacher. At one stage he ran a bar in Spain and thought about applying for a pub tenancy in England. However, the idea was vetoed by his wife, former actress turned teacher Celia Melia.

== Career ==
He began acting in television in the early 1970s, usually playing heavies or policemen, though he spent four years performing classic plays with the National Theatre. In 1990, he joined the BBC One soap opera EastEnders as pub landlord Eddie Royle; however, he lasted only just over a year in this role, as his character was killed off in September 1991. His character was stabbed by Nick Cotton (John Altman), who was later tried for the murder but cleared.

After leaving EastEnders, he appeared as Frank Dagley on Dangerfield, and, more recently, Jerry Block for over a hundred episodes of the footballing soap opera Dream Team.

His rugged features have led to parts in numerous crime dramas: The Sweeney, The Gentle Touch, Fox, The Bill, Minder in the Series 1 episode "Monday Night Fever", C.A.T.S. Eyes, Campion, The Chinese Detective, Dempsey and Makepeace, Rumpole of the Bailey, Inspector Morse, Maigret, The Detectives, Daylight Robbery and New Tricks.

He has also had parts in many other established dramas, including When the Boat Comes In, Coronation Street, Casualty and more recently Doctors and Emmerdale. He appeared in Doctor Who, and a minor part on Blake's 7. In 2010, he guest starred in Dani's House.
