= Garey Bridges =

British actor

- Born: 11 August 1969 (age 57); London, England
- Occupation: Actor
- Known for: Lloyd Tavernier in EastEnders

Garey Bridges (born 11 August 1969 in London, England) is a British actor, best known for playing the role of Lloyd Tavernier in the BBC soap opera EastEnders.

== Career ==
He originally trained to be a dancer and performed with Wayne Sleep in The Hot Show Shoe. However, he was told at fourteen that he was too short and this prompted him to change his profession to acting.

His first notable role came in 1988, when he appeared in an episode of ITV's Dramarama entitled Bogeymen. The following year he appeared in the BBC medical television series, Casualty (1989) and the children's drama Press Gang (1989), playing Terry. In 1990 Bridges secured the role of Lloyd Tavernier in the popular soap opera EastEnders. The introduction of the Tavernier family heralded the first time that an entire family had joined the programme all at once. Their introduction was also a well-intentioned attempt to portray a wider range of black characters than had previously been achieved on the show. Even though he was 21 at the time, Bridges played a 15-year-old school boy, who was also the twin of Michelle Gayle's character, Hattie. Bridges wayward character suffered with sickle-cell anaemia, and storylines focused on the problems and restrictions this affliction can have for a young person. His character, along with several other members of the Tavernier family, were written out of the soap in 1992.

Bridges went on to appear in the BBC2 productions O Mary This London and Funky Black Shorts: Home and Away in 1994, and he later played the part of Billy Price in the 1996 film Respect, a drama about champion boxer Bobby Carr (played by Nick Berry) who is forced to retire with permanent damage to his eye. The film was directed by Terry Marcel and was based on a screenplay by Richard La Plante.
