= Tommy Eytle =

Guyanese calypso musician and actor (1926–2007)

- Eytle as Jules Tavernier in EastEnders (1991)
- Born: Thomas Daniel Hicks Eytle; 16 July 1926; Georgetown, British Guiana
- Died: 19 June 2007 (aged 80); Reading, Berkshire, England
- Education: Queen's College, Georgetown
- Occupations: Calypso musician and actor
- Television: EastEnders (1990–1997)
- Spouse: Avis D'Ornellas (m. 1951)

Thomas Daniel Hicks Eytle (16 July 1926 – 19 June 2007) was a Guyanese calypso musician and actor. Although he was born in Guyana, Eytle's career was based in the United Kingdom, where he lived after emigrating in 1951.

Eytle's career began in the 1950s. He initially found success playing African and Caribbean music with his calypso band. He continued to perform musically until the mid-1990s. He had many roles on television, radio, film and stage, but he was most famous for playing the role of Jules Tavernier in the BBC television soap opera EastEnders from 1990 to 1997.

== Early life ==
Eytle was born in Georgetown, Guyana (then British Guiana), to James, a gold miner, and Gertrude Eytle. Eytle attended St Philip's Primary School, Central High School and Queen's College in Georgetown. After finishing his education, he worked as a gold and diamond miner with his father for a year, before joining the Civil Service and qualifying as a land surveyor.

His parents separated in 1951 and his mother and siblings moved to London. Eytle joined them, arriving for a holiday on Festival of Britain Day in 1951, and he decided to stay in the UK. He worked first as a surveyor and draughtsman, before turning to music and working as a bandleader at some of London's top hotels.

== Career ==
=== Musical career ===
Eytle was a self-taught guitarist and in the early 1950s he formed Tommy Eytle's Calypso Band in response to the surge of interest in African and Caribbean music at the time. The band performed a mix of Afro-Caribbean music and modern jazz and, in addition to playing the jazz guitar, Eytle provided the band's vocals. They performed in many jazz venues and nightclubs around the country, including the Sunset Club, The Bag O'Nails, Club Basie, Pigalle Club and Al Burnett's Stork Club.

Tommy Eytle's Calypso Band featured in many BBC plays and were most notable for performing "Narrative Calypso" in the film The Tommy Steele Story (1957), in which Eytle sang as well as playing the guitar.

Eytle worked as a professional musician until the late 1980s, but he was forced to give up playing the guitar due to early onset arthritis in his hands. However, he continued to sing jazz and calypsos into the mid-1990s and was given occasional acoustic solos in BBC's EastEnders, which he sang – in-character – during scenes in the soap's pub, The Queen Vic.

=== Acting career ===
During the 1950s, he was introduced to acting when he auditioned for a few radio plays. Throughout his career he appeared in many BBC radio plays (mostly by black dramatists), which included The Barren One (1958) with Cleo Laine; Lorca's Yerma by Sylvia Wynter; Jan Carew's The Riverman (1968) and Milk in the Coffee (1975). Among other radio plays in which he had roles were Carnival in Trinidad (1975) and God in the Water (1983).

Eytle was also a veteran stage actor. He appeared with Norman Beaton, Mona Hammond and Rudolph Walker at the Royal Court Theatre in Mustapha Matura's acclaimed 1974 Play Mas, which Eytle also performed in the radio adaptation in 1975. In 1981, he appeared in Shakespeare's Measure for Measure at the National Theatre, being one of several actors in the all-black cast. He also played the role of Broderick in the debut production of Winsome Pinnock's Leave Taking at the Liverpool Playhouse in 1987.

Eytle appeared in films such as Naked Fury (1959), The Criminal (1960), The Hi-Jackers (1963), Where Has Poor Mickey Gone? (1964), and on television in programmes such as The Big Pride (ITV, 1961), a psychological drama about a prison breakout in Guyana written by Jan Carew and Sylvia Wynter. Other credits included Danger Man (1965); The Spies (1966); Adam Adamant Lives! (1966); The Saint (1967); The Troubleshooters (1970); Never Say Die (1970); Special Branch (1974); Quiller (1975); Rumpole of the Bailey (1983); Johnny Jarvis (1983) and Casualty (1987) and Bob's Weekend (1996), among others.

Eytle's most notable role was playing the Trinidadian charmer, Jules Tavernier, in BBC's EastEnders from 1990 to 1997. The introduction of the Tavernier family heralded the first time that an entire family had joined the programme all at once. Their introduction was also a well-intentioned attempt to portray a wider range of black characters than had previously been achieved on the show. Eytle played the role for seven years, remaining after the departures of all of his on-screen family. Towards the end of his time on the show, his character became semi-regular, and his appearances became increasingly sparse due to Eytle's poor-health. He was never given an official exit from the series, but was not featured again after December 1997.

== Personal life and death ==
Eytle was one of eight children and two of his elder brothers also had successful careers in Britain. Ernest Eytle was a well-known cricket commentator for the BBC and Les Eytle became the first black mayor of the London Borough of Lewisham in 1984.

In 1951, Eytle married Avis D'Ornellas, who was also from Guyana. They lived in Kenley, Surrey. Eytle died of a heart attack aged 80 on 19 June 2007, in Reading, Berkshire, survived by his wife.
