= Jacqui Gordon-Lawrence =

British actress

- Born: London, England
- Occupations: Actress, lawyer
- Notable work: Etta Tavernier in EastEnders
- Partner(s): Horace Notice (1992–present)
- Children: 2

Jacqui Gordon-Lawrence is a British lawyer and former actress, most famous for playing the role of Etta Tavernier in the BBC soap opera EastEnders. She no longer acts and as of 2008 works in criminal law.

== Career ==
She trained to be a dancer at the Martha Graham Center of Contemporary Dance in New York City, when she moved there with her Jamaican born parents. However, she felt she was not good enough to excel in this profession, so in 1981 she switched to stage acting and later to film and television.

Her first notable role was in the 1989 film Strapless, in which she played a nurse. However, her role in EastEnders has been her most notable. She played the school teacher Etta Tavernier from 1990 to 1992, returning briefly in 1994. The introduction of the Tavernier family heralded the first time that an entire family had joined the programme all at once. Their introduction was also a well-intentioned attempt to portray a wider range of black characters than had previously been achieved on the show. During her stint, Gordon-Lawrence's character battled with many family, marital and religious problems, including the abortion of an unborn child, who had been diagnosed with sickle-cell anaemia.

Since leaving EastEnders, she has gone on to appear in the television mini-series Close Relations (1998), the television film The Greatest Store in the World (1999) and an episode of the ITV police drama The Bill (2001). She has been credited in no other roles since this time and as of 2008, she works for Wainwright & Cummins LLP solicitors in London within their criminal department. She is a credited police station representative, and has expertise in this specific area of criminal law.

== Personal life ==
She lives in Hayes, South East London, with the former boxing champion Horace Notice and their daughters, Naomi and Amelia. Singer and actress Michelle Gayle is godmother to one of Gordon-Lawrence's daughters. She is a follower of the Mormon religion.
