= Michael Ferguson (director) =

British television director (1937–2021)

- Born: 14 June 1937; New Malden, Surrey, England
- Died: 4 October 2021 (aged 84)
- Education: London Academy of Music and Dramatic Art
- Occupations: Television producer/director, screenwriter, actor
- Years active: 1962–2003
- Known for: Doctor Who, The Bill, EastEnders, Casualty
- Spouses: Susan Harris (divorced): Jana Shelden
- Children: 2 daughters

Michael Ferguson (14 June 1937 – 4 October 2021) was a British television director and producer. His early career included directing four serials of the BBC's science fiction series Doctor Who (1966–1971). He later directed ITV's police drama series The Bill and was promoted to become its producer (1988–1989), and as executive producer of the BBC soap opera EastEnders (1989–1991) he was responsible for the introduction of two of its most popular and long-running characters, Phil and Grant Mitchell. He then produced the BBC medical drama series Casualty (1993–1994).

== Early life ==
Ferguson was educated at King's College School in Wimbledon. He performed his national service with the British Army in Cyprus and north Africa. He trained as an actor at the London Academy of Music and Dramatic Art.

== Career ==
Ferguson started his career as a stage actor and director with the Theatre Centre, a touring company visiting schools, before joining the BBC as an assistant floor manager and training to be a director there. He began directing for the BBC in the 1960s on television shows such as Z-Cars (1962–67), The Newcomers, Compact (1964), 199 Park Lane (1965), Out of the Unknown (1969 & 1971) and Doctor Who, for which he directed the serials The War Machines (1966), The Seeds of Death (1969), The Ambassadors of Death (1970) and The Claws of Axos (1971). He remained at the BBC during the 1970s, directing various programmes including Quiller (1975) and Colditz (1972), before moving to rival network ITV in 1976.

At ITV he directed Dickens of London (1976), directed and produced the spy drama The Sandbaggers (1978), Flambards (1979), Airline (1982) and The Glory Boys (1984). In 1985 Ferguson began directing for ITV's police drama The Bill and rose to producer in 1988. Ferguson worked on The Bill during “its most popular period” when it switched in 1987 from a series to a “soap-style” twice-weekly half-hour format. Because of Ferguson's success with the programme, Peter Cregeen - the head of series at the BBC - “poached” him in 1989 to become the executive producer of BBC1's flagship soap opera, EastEnders. Ferguson took over from series producer Mike Gibbon in the latter part of 1989.

EastEnders had come under criticism due to falling ratings and "comic storylines" which many viewers felt were stretching its credibility. According to EastEnders scriptwriter Colin Brake, Ferguson was responsible for bringing in a "new sense of vitality", and creating a programme that was “more in touch” with the “real world” than it had been over the last year. Ferguson altered the way the episodes were produced, changed the way the storylines were conceptualised and introduced a far greater amount of location work than had previously been seen. As a consequence of these changes, a large number of characters were axed in early 1990 as the new production machine cleared way for a new direction and new characters. Among the characters he introduced were the Tavernier family, pub landlord Eddie Royle and most notably the Mitchell brothers and their sister Sam — the Mitchells went on to become major long-term characters, among the most popular featured in the programme. At EastEnders Ferguson was responsible for storylines such as the return of runaway Diane Butcher, Mark Fowler's HIV, Mo Butcher's Alzheimer's, Nick Cotton's attempt to poison his mother Dot Cotton, and the murder of Eddie Royle. Ferguson decided to leave EastEnders in July 1991.

He remained with the BBC, producing the hospital drama series Casualty (1993–94), before returning to ITV in 1996 to once again direct for The Bill. His last directorial credit for the programme was in 2002.

== Personal life ==
Ferguson had two daughters, Tracy and Nikki, by his first wife Susan; Nikki predeceased him. Ferguson died in October 2021, aged 84.

Media offices
Preceded by Mike Gibbon	Executive Producer of EastEnders; January 1990 – November 1991	Succeeded by Pat Sandys
