= Mike Gibbon =

British television director and producer

- Born: John Michael Gibbon; 27 January 1942 (age 84); Fulmer, Buckinghamshire, England
- Occupation: TV Producer/Director
- Years active: 1972–1989
- Television: EastEnders
- Spouse: Moya McCarthy (m. 1976)
- Children: 1 daughter

John Michael Gibbon (born 27 January 1942) is an English television producer and director.

He directed and produced the BBC televised soap opera, EastEnders. He began directing the programme in 1985 and began producing the programme in 1988. He became the show's new producer following the departure of the show's creator and series producer Julia Smith. Due to personal conflict with the series' head, Peter Cregeen, he was replaced by Michael Ferguson. It was reported that Gibbon controversially called for the killing of at least ten long-running characters in a bid to boost ratings. According to the writer David Yallop, acting ability was a key factor in deciding which members of the cast to kill off. Cast lists were marked with black asterisks, signifying a death for their character. One of the written plots saw characters die in an IRA bombing. However, the plots never came to fruition, as Gibbon was demoted and then resigned from the serial.

He is also the deviser and adaptor, with David Yallop, of Herbert Jenkins's Bindle book series.

Gibbon married Moya McCarthy in July 1976 and they have a daughter, Sophie.

== Filmography ==
- New Scotland Yard (1972) - director
- Helen: A Woman of Today (1973) - director
- Thick as Thieves (1974) - director
- Within These Walls (1974) - director
- Intimate Strangers (1974) - director
- Emmerdale Farm -director
- The Brack Report (1982) - director
- Airline - director
- Fair City (1988) - director
- EastEnders (1988–89) - producer
- City of the Rich - executive producer
- The Log of the Ark - producer
- Remains To Be Seen
- The League Against Christmas

Media offices
Preceded by Julia Smith	Executive Producer of EastEnders; 19 February 1989 –28 December 1989	Succeeded by Michael Ferguson
