= List of EastEnders characters introduced in 1989 =

EastEnders logo

The following is a list of characters that first appeared in the BBC soap opera EastEnders in 1989, by order of first appearance.

== Maxine Roberts ==
Maxine Roberts
- EastEnders character
- Portrayed by: Ella Wilder
- First appearance: Episode 415; 26 January 1989
- Last appearance: Episode 427; 9 March 1989
In-universe information
- Occupation: Nurse
- Mother: Mrs Roberts
- Brothers: Darren Roberts
- Sisters: Carmel Jackson
- Nephews: Junior Roberts
- Nieces: Aisha Roberts

Maxine Roberts, played by Ella Wilder, is the selfish sister of Carmel Roberts (Judith Jacob) and Darren Roberts (Gary McDonald), who first appears at Carmel's wedding to Matthew Jackson (Steven Hartley) in January 1989

Maxine is a health care worker and she is highly ambitious. When her elderly parents can no longer cope with the responsibility of caring for her brother's two children, Maxine refuses to take over. She lives in a single room at the hospital where she works and makes it clear that her career is more important. She tries to persuade Carmel to take the children in and when she initially refuses, Maxine threatens to put them into care. Carmel believes that her niece and nephew should live with her, despite her husband's opposition and it causes many arguments. When Carmel's father has a stroke, Maxine brings the children, Junior Roberts (Aaron Carrington) and Aisha Roberts (Aisha Jacob) to the Jacksons, insisting that they take them immediately. Matthew is furious but he eventually relents.

== Paul Priestly ==
Paul Priestly, played by Mark Thrippleton, is a builder, who came to London with a building firm he worked for, then decided to go it alone. He finds work around the Square – the money isn't great but there are benefits – for instance, Julie Cooper (Louise Plowright) discusses his building estimates while sharing a bed with him. He is a ladies man and a heart-breaker, as sixteen-year-old Diane Butcher (Sophie Lawrence) discovers. When their relationship grows too serious, he flees and a devastated Diane runs away from home shortly afterwards.

== Marge Green ==
Marge Green, played by Pat Coombs, is first seen in May 1989 as a friend of Dot Cotton (June Brown) and Ethel Skinner (Gretchen Franklin). Marge also befriends Mo Butcher (Edna Doré), who regularly bosses her about. Marge is an elderly spinster who devotes her life to caring for her sickly 93-year-old mother, which is a massive strain on her. However, her mother dies towards the end of 1989. Although Marge is devastated, her friends helped her through it and she eventually comes to look forward to her future. However, Marge's cousin arrives and cons her into becoming his invalid mother's companion on a cruise ship. She leaves in February 1990, and has not been seen since.

== Trevor Short ==
Trevor Short, played by Phil McDermott, is the inseparable sidekick of Paul Priestly (Mark Thrippleton). He is a well-meaning individual but he isn't blessed with much intelligence, and he manages to mess up almost every job he is given. He has several crushes on the younger women of Walford, but despite his best efforts he never manages to find a girlfriend. Trevor leaves Walford in March 1990 to move to Leeds with his best friend, Paul.

== Julie Cooper ==
Julie Cooper, played by Louise Plowright, is a bubbly, big haired Salford girl, who has a hungry appetite for men. She arrives in Walford in June 1989 to sell a house left to her by her late grandmother, and she uses the money from the sale to open a salon. She has brief affairs with Paul Priestly (Mark Thrippleton), Laurie Bates (Gary Powell) and Grant Mitchell (Ross Kemp), but is shocked when she discovers that Grant has been using her to take over the lease on her salon, with his brother Phil (Steve McFadden). She agrees to give up the lease anyway, but for more money, and returns to Salford in March 1990.

== Janine Butcher ==
Janine Butcher was introduced in 1989 and currently portrayed by Charlie Brooks.

== Clare Butcher ==
Clare Butcher
- EastEnders character
- Portrayed by: Lucy Foxall (1989); Caroline O'Neill (2002)
- Duration: 1989, 2002
- First appearance: Episode 457; 22 June 1989
- Last appearance: Episode 2316; 31 May 2002
- Introduced by: Mike Gibbon (1989); John Yorke (2002)
In-universe information
- Father: Frank Butcher
- Mother: June Butcher
- Stepmother: Pat Butcher
- Brothers: Ricky Butcher
- Sisters: Diane Butcher; Janine Butcher
- Husband: Carl
- Grandmothers: Mo Butcher; Lydia Simmonds
- Uncles: Norman Simmonds
- Aunts: Joan Garwood
- Nephews: Liam Butcher; Jacques Butcher
- Nieces: Tiffany Butcher; Scarlett Butcher

Clare Butcher, played by Lucy Foxell in 1989 and then Caroline O'Neill in 2002, is the eldest child of Frank Butcher (Mike Reid). She is only seen twice in Walford. She is married and has children but neither her husband nor her children have been seen.

She first appears for her father's wedding to Pat Wicks (Pam St Clement) in 1989 and leaves her sister Janine Butcher (Rebecca Michael) with Frank. She and her husband Don have been looking after Janine for most of Janine's childhood until she got promoted at work and moved to Manchester, deciding to leave Janine with Frank as he has settled with Pat. After Frank abandons Janine and leaves Walford in 1996, Janine becomes hostile towards Pat so she is sent to Manchester with Clare off-screen. Clare also looks after her other sister Diane's (Sophie Lawrence) son Jacques (Jack Snell), also off-screen, when Diane abandons him in 1997. Janine returns to Walford in 1999 and gets out of control over the years, getting involved with drugs and prostitution; when Clare briefly returns to Walford in 2002 she is shocked that Janine has fallen so far, and upon leaving a few days later she gives Janine some money to get back on her feet.

On 1 April 2008, shortly before Frank's funeral, Dot Branning (June Brown) asks Clare's sister Diane of her whereabouts, and Diane says that Clare has already said goodbye to her father after visiting him when he was ill, and is now living in Australia with her family.

In 2022, Janine visits Clare in Australia for a few weeks, and visits her whilst Clare is in the UK a few weeks later alongside her daughter, Scarlett (Tabitha Byron) after being involved in and covering up a car crash whilst driving Linda Carter (Kellie Bright).

== Vince Johnson ==
Vince Johnson
- EastEnders character
- Portrayed by: Hepburn Graham
- Duration: 1989–1990
- First appearance: Episode 469; 3 August 1989
- Last appearance: Episode 533; 15 March 1990
- Introduced by: Mike Gibbon

Vince Johnson, played by Hepburn Graham, first appears in August 1989, but was one of many characters to be axed early in 1990, following the introduction of the serial's new executive producer, Michael Ferguson. He makes his last appearance in March 1990. Vince is a friend of Darren Roberts (Gary McDonald). Darren has abandoned his two children, Junior and Aisha Roberts (Aaron Carrington and Aisha Jacob), in 1988; Vince comes to Walford in August 1989 bringing money for them. Vince and Junior bond, and when the Roberts family moves away, Junior returns to Walford occasionally to spend time with Vince.

Vince regularly liaises with Darren by telephone, and is involved in various illegal money making schemes. Vince and Darren con car-salesman Frank Butcher (Mike Reid) by selling him a stolen BMW, which is subsequently confiscated by the police. Unaware of Vince's involvement, Frank tries to reclaim his lost money, so Vince and a gang of hooded thugs advance on Walford with sledgehammers and begin smashing up Frank's car lot to warn him off. When the police arrive, many of the vandals are arrested, but a masked Vince manages to escape thanks to Junior, who directs the chasing police elsewhere. Frank is forced to drop the matter after Vince sends him an anonymous letter threatening to harm his daughter Diane Butcher (Sophie Lawrence) unless he does so. However, when Frank discovers that he has sold another stolen car to Julie Cooper (Louise Plowright), he realises Vince is responsible and attacks him. Despite his rage, Frank refuses to involve the police, which earns Vince's respect, and he compensates Frank for his monetary losses, ending their feud.

Growing weary of a life of crime, Vince attempts to go into legitimate business, hosting themed nights at Walford's community centre with the help of his old friend, Rod Norman (Christopher McHallem). When Rod decides to leave Walford, he sells his African statues to Vince, which Vince attempts to sell on for a profit. When Frank discovers his money making scheme, he harasses Vince to pay off the rest of the money he owes from the stolen car debacle. To get out of his debt, Vince gives Frank the statues, believing their worth to be less than what he owed, but he is later infuriated to discover that he had underestimated their real value. By this time, Frank has sold them on cheaply to Grant Mitchell (Ross Kemp) for £100. Both Frank and Vince try to con Grant's brother Phil Mitchell (Steve McFadden) into selling back the statues for a cheap price; Phil eventually does so, but the deal is void when Grant reveals that he has already sold them for £300 (their real value was £850). Furious, Frank tries to force Vince to compensate him for his lost profit, but Vince refuses and amidst Frank's threats, Vince leaves in March 1990, saying he is sick of Walford.

== Danny Whiting ==
Danny Whiting
- EastEnders character
- Portrayed by: Saul Jephcott
- Duration: 1989–1990
- First appearance: Episode 469; 3 August 1989
- Last appearance: Episode 527; 22 February 1990
In-universe information
- Wife: Mandy Whiting
- Sons: Wayne Whiting
- Daughters: Nicola Whiting; Lauren Whiting

Danny Whiting, played by Saul Jephcott, is a computers salesman who helps Michelle Fowler (Susan Tully), who struggles with the new computer system that David Samuels (Christopher Reich) introduces to the surgery. Michelle and Danny are instantly attracted to each other and go on a date together off-screen.

Danny is suave, middle class, and a lot older than Michelle, but despite their differences Michelle falls for his charms instantly. Their relationship progresses quickly and Michelle is so smitten that she agrees to go away with him for the weekend. However, she is given a shock when she telephones his home and is greeted by a woman's voice. Danny comes clean and confesses that the woman is his wife, Mandy Whiting (Charon Bourke), the mother of his three children. Danny claims that he is no longer in love with Mandy and tells Michelle that he wants to continue their relationship. Michelle is devastated and refuses to consider the idea. Danny's poor treatment of Michelle upsets the locals and Simon Wicks (Nick Berry) and Ricky Butcher (Sid Owen) seek revenge on her behalf by graffiting his car with the words "Love Rat". Danny holds Michelle responsible for the vandalism and storms off leaving her perplexed and lonely.

The following month Danny contacts Michelle hoping to reconcile with her. She refuses, but when Danny creeps into her house late one evening she is seduced by the gesture and agrees to be his mistress. Michelle falls in love with Danny, but he frequently lets her down to be with his wife and children, and she begins to tire of sharing him. To appease her, Danny lies to his wife, telling her that he is attending a computing course, and moves in with Michelle for a few days to spend some time with her. While he is living in Walford, Danny became an accidental hero after he anonymously rescues Marge Green (Pat Coombs) from a gang of muggers. Danny refuses to give testimony to the police, however, fearing that his wife will discover his whereabouts. Michelle is furious about this, especially when she discovers that his testimony could lead to the muggers' imprisonment. Danny eventually relents and tells the police what he witnessed, but deceives them by using Michelle's address as his own, leaving her answerable when they called in search of him. Michelle is infuriated by Danny's dishonesty and cowardice and he exacerbates the situation by avoiding her for several weeks. Michelle's family and friends advise her to finish with him, but she defiantly refuses to do so. Danny eventually contacts Michelle and promises to spend Christmas Eve with her. However, he turns up extremely late and then sours the evening further by giving Michelle a Christmas card that was intended for his wife.

Danny continues to mess Michelle around in 1990 by avoiding all contact with her, which turns her into an emotional wreck. Just when she has given up hope, Danny returns to Walford claiming that he has informed his wife about their affair and has left her. He moves in with Michelle, much to her parents' dismay, and tells her that he wants to be with her permanently. Michelle is overjoyed, but Danny's true colours eventually emerge when his estranged wife shows up in Walford shortly afterwards to confront Michelle. Danny apprehends his wife before they meet and takes her to the launderette where he begs her to take him back. Danny has been given a promotion in Newcastle and he wants Mandy and their children to go with him. Mandy tells him that moving is not an option, but she says she will take him back if he finishes with Michelle and returns to her. Danny refuses to give up his job, however, and he promptly goes to Michelle and makes the same offer.

Despite an array of objections, Michelle agrees to leave her family and friends and move to Newcastle. While Michelle organises the move, Danny makes various attempts to change his wife's mind, all of which were greeted with rejection. On the day of the move, just as they are about to depart, Michelle changes her mind about leaving. Danny is stunned and attempts to forcibly place her in the moving van. Michelle, fearful of Danny's sudden aggression, locks herself in her flat and refuses to let him in. Danny kicks down the door to confront her, but is forced to admit defeat after Michelle confesses that she did not really love him. He departs in a fury and throws all of Michelle's belongings from his van in the process. A week later Michelle discovers the extent of Danny's duplicity when Mandy arrives in Walford and informs her that he'd been attempting to reconcile with her.

== Reggie Thompson ==
Reggie Thompson
- EastEnders character
- Portrayed by: John Rutland
- First appearance: Episode 477; 31 August 1989
- Last appearance: Episode 507; 14 December 1989
In-universe information
- Occupation: Retired

Reggie Thompson, played by John Rutland, lives in sheltered accommodation, along with Ethel Skinner (Gretchen Franklin). Reggie and several other senior residents from Prosper Estate, are intending to go on a coach trip to Clacton in December 1989 and Reggie asks Ethel to go along too. Reggie is a bit of a cad and initially tells Ethel that he can't commit to being her dance partner as he has too many other female suitors he doesn't want to disappoint. However, when Ethel hears news that her former fiancé, Benny Bloom (Arnold Yarrow), has died, he chivalrously agrees to be her partner. Ethel is very excited and she even shows Reggie a saucy nightdress she had bought for the trip. She and Reggie practise their dancing at the community centre for many months and they even perform their dance at The Queen Victoria's talent contest in October 1989, in preparation for the big event. During the trip Reggie preoccupies himself with another woman, Gladys, and spends most of his time getting extremely drunk with all of his friends. This infuriates Ethel and she accuses Reggie of "carrying on" with Gladys, which he denies. However, Ethel later finds him and Gladys together and she furiously chases Gladys out of the hotel while Reggie follows in hot pursuit. Reggie fails to show up for the dance competition with partner Ethel, because he and Gladys have checked out of the hotel and run away to be together.

== Laurie Bates ==
Laurie Bates, played by Gary Powell, arrives in September 1989 and immediately becomes as a rival to Pete Beale (Peter Dean), by opening up a market stall selling fruit and veg in direct competition to him. Laurie then dates Pete's estranged wife Kathy (Gillian Taylforth); however, Kathy loses interest, and the two part company in March 1990. Laurie gives up his stall and moves on soon after.

== Bev Williams ==
Bev Williams
- EastEnders character
- Portrayed by: Uncredited (1989–1990); Diane Langton (1998–1999)
- Duration: 1989–1990, 1998–1999
- First appearance: Episode 489; 12 October 1989
- Last appearance: Episode 1818; 10 August 1999
- Introduced by: Michael Ferguson (1989); Matthew Robinson (1998)
In-universe information
- Husband: Tom Williams
- Daughters: Cindy Beale; Gina Williams
- Grandsons: Steven Beale; Peter Beale
- Granddaughters: Lucy Beale; Cindy Williams; Gina Knight; Anna Knight
- Other relatives: Louie Beale; Jimmy Beale; AJ Branning; Beth Williams

Bev Williams, played by Diane Langton from 1998 to 1999, is the mother of Cindy Beale (Michelle Collins). Bev is originally called Lucy and Cindy names her daughter after her in 1994; however, from 1998 the character is renamed to Bev (the same occurs with Cindy's father, who is referred to as "Edwin" in 1989, and "Tom" thereafter). During the 1980s, she owns a hat stall on Turpin Road market, which Cindy runs for her in 1988. Bev and her husband then move to Devon and her pitch on the market is taken over by Laurie Bates (Gary Powell) in 1989. Bev remains unseen until October 1989, when she and her husband attend Cindy's wedding to Ian Beale (Adam Woodyatt). They are next seen in February 1990, when she and her husband attend their grandson Steven Beale's (Edward Farrell) christening. At the end of 1990, Cindy, Simon Wicks (Nick Berry) and Steven move away from London to stay with Bev in Devon.

Bev is not seen again until November 1998, when Cindy's now former husband, Ian, meets her at the coroner's office following Cindy's death. She had been estranged from her daughter until a few months before she died, when Cindy contacted her asking for money. She could not give Cindy any money, however, as her husband, Tom, had left her that year. Ian gives her a lift to the hospital to see Cindy's newborn baby, Cindy (Ella Wortley), and she tries to get him to take the child in as his own, threatening to put the baby into care. However, custody of the baby is eventually given to Bev's other daughter Gina Williams (Nicola Cowper), who lives with her mother in Devon. Bev appears at Cindy's funeral, and later in August 1999 when Ian visits her and Gina to watch the eclipse. She persuades Mel Owen (Tamzin Outhwaite) to propose to Ian, as Gina is trying to split them up. In 2007, Gina and Cindy Jr appear without Bev. In August 2010, her granddaughter Lucy Beale (Melissa Suffield) moves to Devon to live with Bev. Four months later, her grandson Peter Beale (Thomas Law) goes to live with her. In 2024, it is revealed that Bev has since died.

Dan Laurie from Manchester Evening News opined that Langton "graced EastEnders" as Bev.

== Steven Beale ==
Steven Beale is played by Edward Farrell from 1989 to 1990, Stuart Stevens from 1992 to 1996, Edward Savage from 1997 to 2002, and Aaron Sidwell from 2007 to 2008 and 2016 to 2017. Steven is born on 26 December 1989 to Cindy Beale and Simon Wicks (Michelle Collins and Nick Berry). Cindy is married to Ian Beale (Adam Woodyatt), and she convinces him that he is Steven's father. Cindy tells Ian the truth when she and Simon reconcile. They leave Walford with Steven in December 1990; however, Ian and Cindy reconcile in 1992, and Ian raises Steven as his son, even after Cindy's death in 1998. Steven goes to live in New Zealand with his biological father Simon in 2002, but returns to Walford in 2007. However, Steven's return has disastrous consequences for Ian and his family, and he flees in 2008 after being disowned by Ian. Steven made his return on 27 May 2016 and was killed off on 8 September 2017 during a high-profile stunt week.

== Others ==
Character	Date(s)	Actor	Circumstances
Lynne Jackson	26 January	Patricia Ford	Lynne is the estranged mother of Matthew Jackson. She travels from Bristol to attend his wedding after Matthew's fiancée Carmel Roberts sends her an invitation, but Matthew is irate at her presence, having never forgiven her for abandoning him and his father when he was 15. Lynne, who was only 16 when Matthew was born, was forced into a marriage with Matthew's father and claims she eventually fell in love with someone else before leaving; Matthew would not reply to her letters, meaning she never got a chance to tell her personally why she left. David Samuels (Christopher Reich) is attracted to her, but nothing comes of it, aside from her telling him the reasons for hers and Matthew's complicated relationship.
Nancy	7 February	Megan Williams	An Australian woman who applies for a job at The Queen Victoria public house. Frank Butcher and Pat Wicks give her a trial behind the bar, and she proves popular with the male customers, but Pat says she will not be getting the job.
Brian	9 February	Richard Jamieson	A man who applies for a job at The Queen Victoria public house. Landlady Pat Wicks interviews him and while she calls his previous employer, Brian decides to have a drink. He stays for the rest of the day and gets drunk, leading Frank Butcher to escort him from the pub.
Kevin	14 February	Billy Clarke	Two of Colin Russell and Guido Smith's friends, who attend a dinner party at Colin's flat. Kevin takes Ian Beale's business card and flirts with him.
John	14 February	Mike Dowling	Two of Colin Russell and Guido Smith's friends, who attend a dinner party at Colin's flat. Kevin takes Ian Beale's business card and flirts with him.
Mr Rhodes	2 May–7 December	Sid Williams	Mr Rhodes is a local councillor. Mo Butcher (Edna Dore) argues with him over the phone about the state of the community centre and goes to confront him in person but is taken by surprise when she sees that Rhodes is in a wheelchair. The pair clash when Mo makes suggestions of improvements to the centre and begin a feud which lasts throughout the year.
Hazel	16 May 1989 – 1 March 1990	Virginia Fiol	Hazel arrives in Walford, claiming Nick is the father of her baby, Dorothy Nicola. Nick's mother Dot is overjoyed to be a grandmother and helps Hazel out financially. Nick's father, Charlie does not trust Hazel and follows her to her sister's place and tells Dot the baby is Hazel's niece, Katy Joanna. Hazel apologizes to Dot for the deception. When Nick learns about Hazel's games, he beats her up, leaving her close to death. Rod Norman visits Hazel in hospital and they begin a relationship, which does not last and Rod leaves the square for India.
Joan Leggett	27–29 June	Rhoda Lewis	A woman who Charlie Cotton marries biagmously. She turns in up in Walford looking for him but is met by his legal wife Dot instead. It emerges that Charlie had told Joan his name was Tommy and had lied to her about being married.
Marie Davies	10 August – 7 December	Vicky Murdock	A sixteen-year-old trainee hairdresser who works for Julie Cooper at her salon. She is pursued by Ricky Butcher, but takes a liking to Paul Priestly. She accidentally dyes Cindy Williams' hair pink, and attends Cindy's wedding to Ian Beale. In December 1989, when she overhears Julie saying that she is going to sack her in the new year, Marie angrily resigns before Julie gets to do so. Marie asks Ricky to get her wages from Julie but he is unsuccessful and she dumps him and leaves Walford.
Christine Pretis	31 August 1989 –12 March 1992	Vivien Heilbron	A woman who does the bookkeeping for Frank Butcher at Frank's Autos, from August 1989 until 1990, when he decides to sack her, after deeming her services too expensive. Christine later comes to Frank's rescue when he has a visit from the Inland Revenue. She tells him he could apply for an appeal, but in the meantime would have to give them £4,000–£5,000. She persuades Frank to sell his Mercedes, telling him that the bailiffs will sell it at auction if he doesn't.
Margaret Stone	14 September	Valerie Bell	Benny Bloom's daughter. She accuses Ethel Skinner of dishonestly inheriting the £2,000 Benny had left her and attempts to contest her father's will.
Stella	30 November 1989–24 May 1990	Cindy O'Callaghan	Ashraf Karim's mistress. Ashraf's wife Sufia is aware of their long-standing affair. Despite frequent assurances that things are over, Sufia threatens to leave after discovering Ashraf and Stella are still carrying on but Ashraf assures her it is over, which is true due to Stella tiring of the affair. However, months later Ashraf talks Stella into reigniting their affair and he regularly sneaks away to be with her. Their affair is soon discovered and The Ahmed family, whose son Jabbar is bethrothed to Ashraf's daughter Shireen, then cancel the engagement. Ashraf and Stella part ways and the Karims move to Bristol.
Mr Conroy	12–14 December (2 episodes)	William Lucas	Mr Conroy attends a dance competition at The Rialto Hotel and meets Marge Green in the lobby. They dance together and he later praises her friend Dot Cotton's dancing ability. Mr Conroy and Marge have lunch together and go for a walk along the seafront, where he tells Marge about his life. Mr Conroy asks Marge to marry him, but she turns him down because she cannot leave her mother. Later that night, they dance the waltz together and Mr Conroy leaves alone, just as Marge learns her mother has died.
Melvin	12–14 December (2 episodes)	Roy Spencer	The manager of The Rialto Hotel in Clacton that is hosting a dance competition. He greets the bus from Walford when they are late and tries to please the guests. He is suspicious of Ethel Skinner's multiple outings and large bag, and later learns that she has brought her pug dog Willy with her when they meet on the beach.
Ted	12–14 December (2 episodes)	Richard Davies	A Welsh man staying at The Rialto Hotel for the weekend. He makes various complaints to the manager and he is rude and short with Mo Butcher, who is rude back. They soon bond over their children and spend the evening talking.
Sammy	14 December	Uncredited	A dalmatian that belongs to Melvin. He runs up to Ethel Skinner and her pug dog Willy on the beach.
Barbara	21 December 1989 – 27 February 1990 (13 episodes)	Alannah O'Sullivan	A woman who dates Pete Beale after meeting him in New Zealand. She travels to Walford to be with Pete for Christmas. Barbara gets along well with his family and his former wife Kathy Beale. However, after a couple of months the couple realise that they need to end their relationship, as Pete does not want to leave Walford and Barbara misses her home.
