= Laurie Bates =

Fictional character from the BBC soap opera EastEnders

- EastEnders character
- Portrayed by: Gary Powell
- Duration: 1989–1990
- First appearance: Episode 480; 12 September 1989
- Last appearance: Episode 531; 8 March 1990
- Introduced by: Mike Gibbon
In-universe information
- Occupation: Market trader
- Sisters: Shirley Bates; Lynn Bates
- Wife: Sandra (backstory); Marianne (backstory)

Laurie Bates is a fictional character from the BBC soap opera EastEnders played by Gary Powell. Laurie was introduced by executive producer Mike Gibbon in September 1989 as a rival to the long-established character Pete Beale (Peter Dean) – he opens up a business in direct competition to him and then dates his estranged wife Kathy (Gillian Taylforth). Laurie Bates was one of many characters to be axed early in 1990, following the introduction of the serial's new executive-producer, Michael Ferguson. He makes his last appearance in March 1990, lasting roughly six months on-screen.

== Character creation and development ==
1989 was a year of big change for EastEnders, both behind the cameras and in front of them. Original production designer, Keith Harris, left the show, and co-creators, Tony Holland and Julia Smith, both decided that the time had come to move on too; their final contribution coinciding with the exit of one of EastEnders most successful characters, Den Watts (Leslie Grantham). A new producer, Mike Gibbon, took control of the show and he enlisted the most experienced writers to take over the storylining of the programme, which included Charlie Humphreys, Jane Hollowood and Tony McHale.

As well as Den, several other long running characters left the show in 1989, including three original cast members, Angie Watts (Anita Dobson), as well as Sue and Ali Osman (Sandy Ratcliff and Nejdet Salih) and their family; Donna Ludlow (Matilda Ziegler); Carmel Jackson (Judith Jacob) and her family, and one of the show's more controversial characters, Colin Russell (Michael Cashman). It was decided that 1989 was to be “a year of change” in Walford. EastEnders script-writer, Colin Brake, has suggested that "it was almost as if Walford itself was making a fresh start".

At the time EastEnders had come under criticism in the British media for being too depressing; arguably a reputation that it has never been able to shake. The programme makers were determined to change this. In 1989 there was a deliberate attempt to increase the lighter, more comic aspects of life in Albert Square. This led to the introduction of some characters who were deliberately conceived as comic or light-hearted. Such characters included Julie Cooper (Louise Plowright), a man-mad hairdresser; Marge Green — a batty older lady played by veteran comedy actress, Pat Coombs; Trevor Short (Phil McDermott), the "village idiot", and his friend, northern heart-breaker Paul Priestly (Mark Thrippleton); wheeler-dealer Vince Johnson (Hepburn Graham) and Laurie Bates, who was introduced in September and became Pete Beale's (Peter Dean) sparring partner.

On-screen Laurie arrived in Turpin Road Market and set up a rival fruit and veg stall in direct competition to Pete and the rivalry went further when he became romantically interested in Pete's estranged wife, Kathy Beale (Gillian Taylforth). A feud between Laurie and Pete was launched, which included various jibes and games of one-upmanship, as each tried to outdo each other.

Humour was an important element in the storylines during 1989, with a greater amount of slapstick and light comedy than ever before. 1989's changes were a “brave experiment” and while some found this period of EastEnders entertaining, many other viewers felt that the comedy stretched the programme's credibility somewhat. The programme still covered many issues in 1989, such as domestic violence, drugs, racism and rape – specifically concerning the victim's (Kathy) struggles to move on from the ordeal and trust other men (Laurie); however, the new emphasis on a more balanced mix between "light and heavy storylines" gave the "illusion" that the show had lost a "certain edge".

By the end of the year EastEnders had acquired a new executive producer, Michael Ferguson, who had previously been a successful producer on ITV's The Bill. Ultimately, Ferguson was responsible for bringing in a new sense of vitality, and creating a programme that was "more in touch" with the "real world" than it had been over the last year. A new era began in 1990 with the introduction of the Mitchell brothers, Phil (Steve McFadden) and Grant (Ross Kemp), two extremely successful characters, who would go on to dominate the soap thereafter. As the new production machine cleared the way for new characters and a new direction, a number of characters were axed from the show at the start of the year. Among them was Laurie, as well as every other "comedic" character that had been introduced to the show in 1989. By March 1990 they had all gone. On-screen it became clear that Laurie's "infatuation" with Kathy was not reciprocated. Their on/off relationship came to an end and Laurie decided to give up his stall in Walford, making his final screen appearance on 8 March 1990.

== Storylines ==
Laurie arrives in September 1989, taking over a vacant stall on Turpin Road market, where Cindy Beale’s (Michelle Collins) mother had formerly sold hats. Laurie sells fruit and veg by trade, opening up in direct competition to the resident fruit and veg trader, Pete Beale (Peter Dean). A trade war escalates as Laurie tries to pilfer all Pete's customers by undercutting his prices. Meanwhile, Laurie catches the eye of hairdresser Julie Cooper (Louise Plowright). They date briefly, but Laurie is far more taken with Kathy Beale (Gillian Taylforth) – Pete's recently estranged wife. Kathy is initially wary of Laurie, but she begins to warm to him after he shares his sad life story with her – he'd been scarred by the loss of his second wife, who had died from cancer. Julie is extremely jealous of their blossoming romance, and Pete is furious that Laurie is trying to steal not only his customers, but also his wife. Numerous rows erupt between Laurie and Pete, as each tries to outdo the other.

Laurie and Kathy's romance progresses slowly, as she was raped in 1988. Finding it hard to trust men, she is unwilling to rush things with Laurie and Julie takes advantage of this. She seduces Laurie in October 1989 and they spend the night together but Laurie regrets it the next day, particularly when he is shunned by Kathy. Julie assumes that Laurie wants a relationship but he tells her their night together was a mistake. Incensed, Julie tries to turn him against Kathy, telling him that she was raped but this only makes him more sympathetic. He persuades Kathy to give him another chance and promises to take things slowly. Kathy and Laurie face objections from Pete and Kathy's son Ian (Adam Woodyatt), who takes Pete's side and refuses to accept Laurie as Kathy's new beau. After a long period of feuding, Pete eventually accepts that he and Kathy are over and the Beales call a truce with Laurie. By 1990, Kathy finally feels ready to sleep with Laurie; however, their attempt at consummation fails and Laurie storms out angry and embarrassed (the reason for which is never divulged, although it is indicated that Kathy had laughed at Laurie and he later tells her that she “has a knack for laughing at the wrong time”). After this, Kathy loses interest and her ambiguous behaviour begins to confuse Laurie. He is keen to hold on to Kathy and he tries his best to please her, but she begins to feel that he is treating her like a possession – buying her expensive clothes and jewellery and showing her off like a “trophy”. Unaware of Kathy's discontent, Laurie arranges a lavish date but when he comes to collect her, she refuses to go and ends the relationship. Laurie takes the rejection badly and some tactless comments regarding her sexual abstinence makes Kathy believe that he has hidden shallows. He storms off, dropping his wallet in his haste and, when Kathy retrieves it, she discovers that it contains a photograph of woman who strongly resembles her. Kathy concludes that Laurie has been attempting to recreate his dead wife through her, by dressing her in the same clothes and jewellery. Following this, Laurie becomes depressed and begins drinking heavily. His sister Shirley (Sarah Swingler) visits Kathy, asking her to tell him why she has ended their relationship which she does, accusing him of trying to turn her into a replica of his deceased wife; however, he tells her that the woman in the photo was not his dead wife. Kathy apologizes for jumping to conclusions; they call a truce and realize that they are not right for each other. This is Laurie's last appearance, though it is revealed that he had decided to give up his market pitch and move on, an act which fuels rumours amongst the traders that Turpin Road Market is due to be closed.
