= Lorna Cartwright =

Fictional character from the BBC soap opera "EastEnders"

- EastEnders character
- Portrayed by: Janet Dibley
- Duration: 1997–1998, 2016
- First appearance: Episode 1483; 31 July 1997
- Last appearance: Episode 5266; 19 April 2016
- Introduced by: Jane Harris (1997); Dominic Treadwell-Collins (2016)
In-universe information
- Occupation: Corporal; Counsellor
- Husband: Dave (backstory)

Lorna Cartwright is a fictional character from the BBC soap opera EastEnders, played by Janet Dibley intermittently between 31 July 1997 and 23 April 1998. Lorna was introduced primarily as a catalyst to break up Phil Mitchell's (Steve McFadden) marriage to Kathy Beale (Gillian Taylforth). Although producers reportedly wanted to develop the character further, actress Janet Dibley declined their offer of an extended contract, as she disagreed with a proposed storyline that would see Lorna gang raped. The character returned on 17 March 2016, as part of Phil's cirrhosis storyline.

== Creation and development ==
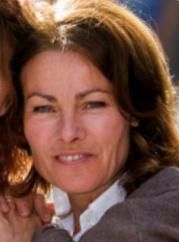
Janet Dibley (pictured) played Lorna

Lorna Cartwright was introduced in July 1997 under Series Producer Jane Harris. Yorkshire actress Janet Dibley was cast in the role, previously known for her starring role opposite Nicholas Lyndhurst in the ITV sitcom The Two of Us.

Lorna, described as "a drunken loner", was part of a storyline that centred on the character Phil Mitchell (Steve McFadden) and his ongoing struggles with alcoholism. A fellow alcoholic, Lorna met Phil at an AA meeting and "became attached to him"; they began a torrid affair, which ended badly. Lorna's principal purpose was to break up the marriage of Phil and his wife Kathy (Gillian Taylforth), which eventually happened in a special set of episodes, that was broadcast in August 1997 and was filmed in Paris, France. A critic for The Independent commented on the Paris episodes: "Phil is jumpy because he expects Lorna to emerge shrieking from the bushes at any moment; stabbing wildly about her with a carving knife (she gave a tiny clue to her highly strung nature the other night, by stubbing a cigarette out on his chest). He was so nervous, indeed, that he eventually confessed his infidelity to Kathy. If he thought that this was going to buy him a quiet few days of remorse and mutual weeping, he was wrong. The wedding ring went straight in the Seine in the middle of a blazing soap aria from Gillian Taylforth."

After being absent from August 1997, Lorna reappeared once again in February 1998. Lorna was involved in the storyline that saw the character Kathy depart the serial after 13 years; her suicide bid helped to ruin Phil and Kathy's chance of patching up their marriage, and Kathy left for a new life in South Africa. Following the climax of this storyline, Lorna departed. The producers of EastEnders had wanted to keep the character in the show, but Janet Dibley reportedly turned down the BBC's £130,000 pay offer after discovering they were planning to turn Lorna into a prostitute who was to be gang-raped.

It would have been the first time the soap had shown such an attack, but Dibley feared the "harrowing scenes" would lead to her six-year-old son being taunted. She reportedly commented, "It just doesn't feel right. I don't care how much money is on offer. I can't do those scenes…I am terrified about how it might affect [my son]. I don't want him getting taunted at school." Dibley allegedly heard about Lorna's intended storyline from rumours on set, and approached series producer Mike Hudson to talk it through. After several meetings, Dibley told Hudson she was unsatisfied with the storyline and refused to sign a new contract. The producers were reportedly upset over her decision, "because they saw Janet becoming one of the most important stars of the show." The scripts were subsequently re-written and Lorna made her final appearance in April 1998.

Dibley's decision was supported by MPs and women's groups, who condemned the BBC for planning to screen gang rape scenes, which would have been shown 90 minutes before the 9 pm watershed. Philippa Chipping, of the Domestic Violence Intervention Project, said the storyline was irresponsible: "I completely understand Janet's fear of playing what would be a very traumatic scene. EastEnders would not be able to give a sensible and responsible handling of the issue." A counsellor at the London Rape Crisis centre added: "The scriptwriters are using the traumatic experience that many women have gone through just to increase their ratings. They should speak to victims before doing something like this. Janet deserves full credit for the stand she has taken." Tory MP Ann Widdecombe also praised Dibley's decision: "Well done to her. It's high time somebody took a stand. EastEnders is watched by an awful lot of children and something like this should not be shown." Labour MP Ronnie Campbell added, "to show a gang-rape in a soap opera is entirely wrong. I am pleased that this actress has taken a stand. It is a very bold move." Mary Whitehouse, of the National Viewers' and Listeners' Association, said: "I think her actions are very commendable. It's splendid that she has turned down the offer of more money to stand by her principles. There is far too much sex and violence screened on TV when children are watching." Conservative MP Teddy Taylor said, "Janet will lose a great deal of money by the action she has taken, but she will gain a great deal in helping to improve standards in British broadcasting."

Dibley also received praise from the media. Pam Francis of the Sunday Mirror commented, "If it were not for the fact that Janet Dibley plays such a tragic alcoholic in EastEnders, I'd send her a bottle of bubbly to toast her protest. It takes a brave performer to fight for what she believes in, particularly a single mother like Janet who is sacrificing a lucrative contract. But you can't put a price on the damage caused by exposing young viewers to brutal scenes. It is known that children as young as Janet's son Bobby, six, tune in to the soap…. By standing her ground, Janet Dibley is giving what I consider the performance of a lifetime." While Dibley was praised, EastEnders was heavily criticised in the media for planning the storyline. One reporter questioned the competency of the programme makers, saying, "Are producers of EastEnders so unimaginative that they couldn't think of a future for Janet's character Lorna other than turn her into the tart…" Another accused the show's producers of being prepared to expose "children to scenes of violence and sex, which are both gratuitous and offensive", merely to bring in higher ratings, and beat their biggest soap rival, Coronation Street. John Blunt, from the Lancashire Evening Telegraph, accused the gang rape storyline of being the latest novelty wretchedness to be gratuitously used by soap scriptwriters "in the name of family entertainment". He criticised the UK broadcasting watchdog's efficiency at protecting young children who routinely watch soap operas, commenting: "Short of parents having the good sense to turn the TV off and spare their children from exposure to such coarse assaults on their innocence, a much firmer line needs to be taken by our broadcasting standards watchdogs - whose evident ineffectiveness is brought home by Janet Dibley showing what ought to be done in the name of common decency and family values."

Despite the controversy surrounding her departure, actress Janet Dibley has since been complimentary about her role in EastEnders. In 2006 she commented, "It was a great part…[Lorna] wreaked havoc and left."

== Storylines ==
Lorna is an alcoholic who Phil Mitchell (Steve McFadden) meets at his AA meetings. She bumps into Phil at a café one afternoon and is openly attracted to him. Phil, whose marriage is suffering due to his alcoholism, finds a kindred spirit in Lorna. She understands his struggles with addiction in a way that his wife can not. When Lorna invites Phil back to her place, she is shocked to discover that he is married, as in her experience, alcoholism destroys marriages - her alcoholism had destroyed hers and her ex-husband was awarded custody of their children after she went to court, drunk. However, Lorna is not perturbed, and the following meeting, she invites Phil back to her place again; he cannot resist her advances and they have sex.

Phil is plagued with guilt, he tries several times to end his affair with Lorna, but he cannot and always ends up having sex with her again. However, Lorna begins expecting more than he is prepared to give. He ends their affair when she starts coming to his home in Albert Square but this infuriates Lorna. She phones Phil's house and makes herself known to his wife Kathy (Gillian Taylforth). With Kathy's suspicions raised, Phil concocts a story that Lorna is an obsessive alcoholic, who has merely taken his rejection badly. However, when Phil goes to Paris, he is given a hand-written suicidal letter from Lorna, ridiculing his skills in bed. Kathy demands to know what is in the letter, leaving Phil no choice but to admit to the affair. Kathy's response is to throw her wedding ring in the River Seine, telling Phil that marrying him is the worst mistake of her life.

Lorna arrives drunk and homeless at The Reverend Alex Healy's (Richard Driscoll) refuge centre, Bridge House. Lorna's suicidal threats cause concern in good samaritan Sarah Hills (Daniela Denby-Ashe), but she cannot cope with Lorna's constant binge drinking. Sarah seeks help from her Aunt Kathy, Phil's estranged wife. Kathy, a former Samaritan, tries talking some sense into Lorna, unaware that she is talking to the woman who caused the breakdown of her marriage. After listening to Lorna's tales of woe, Kathy realises the truth and exploded at Lorna for breaking up her family. Lorna is incensed to discover that, even after Kathy dumped him, Phil did not want her. Phil struggles to cope with Lorna's suicidal threats but Kathy is more supportive. She visits Lorna and is told that she has turned to prostitution, and when Lorna is assaulted — allegedly by a client — Kathy allows her to move in with her to recuperate. Phil is furious.

Lorna makes various attempts to reignite her affair with Phil, hampering any reconciliation between him and Kathy. When Lorna discovers that Kathy is planning to emigrate to South Africa, she immediately tells Phil, just to cause trouble between them. Kathy turns on her, and following rejection from Phil, Lorna decides to take her own life by swallowing a cocktail of pills and gin in Phil's bathroom. Phil breaks the door down and calls an ambulance, stalling his attempt to win Kathy back. She leaves for South Africa before Phil has a chance to persuade her to stay. Lorna survives her suicide attempt and with the help of Rev. Healy, she admits herself into a detox programme.

Eighteen years later, Phil is surprised to meet Lorna at an alcoholic support group and asks her to leave. When she reveals she is leading the session, he leaves, despite her claims she wants to help him like he helped her many years ago. A few weeks later, Phil goes to the support group with the persuasion and support of his daughter, Louise Mitchell (Tilly Keeper). Lorna allows Phil into the group when he says he wants to stop drinking.

== Reception ==
A writer from Inside Soap wrote that Dibley "made waves" when she first appeared as Lorna in the soap.
