= Julie Cooper (EastEnders) =

Fictional character in the BBC soap opera EastEnders

- EastEnders character
- Portrayed by: Louise Plowright
- Duration: 1989–1990
- First appearance: Episode 451; 1 June 1989
- Last appearance: Episode 533; 15 March 1990
- Introduced by: Mike Gibbon
In-universe information
- Occupation: Hairdresser
- Husband: Billy (backstory)
- Grandmothers: Eileen Robinson

Julie Cooper is a fictional character from the BBC soap opera EastEnders, played by Louise Plowright from 1989 to 1990. The character was one of Mike Gibbon's introductions, but she was axed in 1990 at the start of Michael Ferguson's reign as executive producer. Julie is portrayed as a bubbly, big haired Salford girl, who has a hungry appetite for men.

== Creation and development ==
Writer Colin Brake has suggested that 1989 was a year of big change for EastEnders, both behind the cameras and in front of them. Original production designer Keith Harris left the show, and co-creators Tony Holland and Julia Smith both decided that the time had come to move on, too; their final contribution coincided with the exit of one of EastEnders' most successful characters, Den Watts (Leslie Grantham). Producer Mike Gibbon was given the task of running the show and he enlisted the most experienced writers to take over the storylining of the programme, including Charlie Humphreys, Jane Hollowood and Tony McHale.

According to Brake, the departure of two of the soap's most popular characters, Den and Angie Watts (Anita Dobson), had left a void in the programme, which needed to be filled. In addition several other long-running characters left the show that year, including two original cast members, Sue and Ali Osman (Sandy Ratcliff and Nejdet Salih), and their family; Donna Ludlow (Matilda Ziegler); Carmel Jackson (Judith Jacob); and Colin Russell (Michael Cashman). Brake has indicated that the production team decided that 1989 was to be a year of change in Walford, commenting: "It was almost as if Walford itself was making a fresh start".

At the time, the programme had come under criticism in the British media for being too depressing, and according to Brake, the programme makers were determined to change this. In 1989 there was a deliberate attempt to increase the lighter, more comic aspects of life in Albert Square. This led to the introduction of some characters who were deliberately conceived as comic or light-hearted. Such characters included Julie Cooper; Marge Green – a batty older lady played by veteran comedy actress Pat Coombs; Trevor Short (Phil McDermott), the "village idiot", and his friend northern heartbreaker Paul Priestly (Mark Thrippleton); wheeler-dealer Vince Johnson (Hepburn Graham); and Laurie Bates (Gary Powell), who became Pete Beale's (Peter Dean) sparring partner.

Julie Cooper has been described by author Hilary Kingsley as "a man-mad insatiable flirt, bubbly with a comic but shrewd persona". She was scripted to be sassy but streetwise and she brought "a touch of northern culture to the programme". The relatively unknown Cheshire-born actress Louise Plowright was eventually cast in the role. The casting director was initially dubious about giving her the role, as Plowright, then thirty-three, didn't look "old enough or tough enough to play this serious man eater". In an interview given in Hilary Kingsley's EastEnders Handbook, Plowright comments: "I really played up the Bette Midler act...That did it."

Brake suggests that humour was an important element in EastEnders' storylines during 1989, with a greater amount of slapstick and light comedy than ever before. He has classed 1989's changes as a brave experiment, and has suggested that, while some found this period of EastEnders entertaining, many other viewers felt that the comedy stretched the programme's credibility somewhat. Although the programme still covered many issues in 1989, such as domestic violence, drugs, rape and racism, Brake reflected that the new emphasis on a more balanced mix between "light and heavy storylines" gave the illusion that the show had lost a "certain edge".

By the end of the year, EastEnders had acquired a new executive producer, Michael Ferguson, who had previously been a successful producer on ITV's The Bill. Brake has suggested that Ferguson was responsible for bringing in a new sense of vitality, and creating a programme that was more in touch with the real world than it had been over the last year. A new era began in 1990 with the introduction of the Mitchell brothers, Phil (Steve McFadden) and Grant (Ross Kemp), successful characters who would go on to dominate the soap thereafter. As the new production machine cleared the way for new characters and a new direction, several characters were axed from the show at the start of the year. Among them was Julie, as well as other characters that had been introduced to the show in 1989; by March 1990 they had all gone. Several of the actors were upset to be leaving the programme so soon, but with the show's new direction there was no place for characters "whose prime function was to be comic relief". Louise Plowright has since revealed that she would have liked to have stayed with the soap longer, but that the split was an amicable one. She commented: "They just didn't know where to go with the character."

== Storylines ==
=== Backstory ===
Julie was born in Walford then moved to Salford with her mother (who was a prostitute) as a small girl. Described as a "tough nut", who likes "a good time" but is "nobody's plaything", Julie married a man named Billy, who two-timed her and she'd subsequently vowed that no man would ever hurt her again. A further sadness involved her inability to have children, something Billy failed to be supportive about. Julie decided that she needed a new start, so she left Billy and looked into opening her own business in Walford.

=== 1989–1990 ===
In June 1989, Julie returns to Walford to sell the house (number 55 Victoria Road) left to her by her late grandmother. She leases a vacant property and employs handyman, Paul Priestly (Mark Thrippleton), and his friend, Trevor Short (Phil McDermott), to renovate it, leaving many locals wondering what sort of business Julie is intending to open. Dot Cotton (June Brown) jumps to the wrong conclusion when she sees a flier advertising Julie's "personal services" and assumes she is opening a brothel. She petitions against the opening of Julie's business, but is embarrassed when Ethel Skinner (Gretchen Franklin) — who had known Julie's mother years ago — discovers that Julie is a hairdresser and beautician and intends to open a salon. The salon, named Julie's, is situated at 11 Turpin Road. Michelle Fowler (Susan Tully) becomes the salon receptionist and a young trainee named Marie Davies (Vivien Heilbron) is also employed but doesn't stay long as she regularly clashes with Julie. During her stay in Walford, Julie lives in one of the flats at 43 Albert Square.

Julie is attracted to fellow northerner Paul Priestly and, despite him dating Diane Butcher (Sophie Lawrence), she seduces him and they have sex. Their affair continues for several weeks, much to Diane's annoyance, but ends when Paul begins suspecting that Julie is using him to get a cheap deal on the work he is doing on the salon. Paul returns to Diane, but Diane cannot forgive Julie and plays various vengeful tricks, such as sabotaging the opening day of her salon and sending her a male escort to make her look desperate. Julie responds by flirting with Paul to infuriate Diane, and their feud culminates in a showdown in The Queen Victoria public house one night, which leaves Diane looking the fool.

Meanwhile, Julie turns her attentions to new market trader, Laurie Bates (Gary Powell), but he is more interested in Kathy Beale (Gillian Taylforth). Julie is unperturbed and flirts outrageously with Laurie at every opportunity. Laurie's relationship with Kathy does not progress the way he had hoped and Julie takes advantage – letting Laurie know that she can satisfy him in ways Kathy wouldn't. In October 1989, at the Vic's Hallowe'en party, Laurie gives in and goes home with Julie as Kathy watches. Julie assumes Laurie wants a relationship with her, but after receiving Kathy's scorn, he realises it is her he wants after all. He dumps Julie, telling her their night together was a mistake. Julie tries turning him against Kathy by telling him about her rape but only makes him more sympathetic to Kathy and they grow closer as a result.

By 1990, Julie decides that owning her own business is more trouble than it is worth. Her upmarket establishment never really takes off, not making enough money even to pay the bills. By March, Julie is facing bankruptcy and having her salon repossessed. While pondering over how to solve her money problems, she catches the eye of brothers Phil and Grant Mitchell (Steve McFadden and Ross Kemp). They both approach Julie but are unaware that they are trying to chat up the same woman — and Julie flirts with them both. Phil manages to secure a date with her first but opts to follow up a business deal and stands Julie up. When Grant discovers that it is Julie who Phil was supposed to meet, he goes to her flat in his brother's place. Grant manages to persuade Julie that he is a better choice than his good for nothing brother, and is eventually invited into her flat, where they share a bottle of wine. Their date goes well and Julie is so impressed that she shamelessly invites Grant to spend the night with her.

The following day, Phil meets Grant and tells him about his business meeting the night before. A gangster associate of his wants to take over the lease on Julie's salon and he wants to buy it at a vastly reduced price. Phil has been instructed to scare Julie into selling it. However, Phil realises Julie will not be so easily pushed around. Realising that he has blown his chances with her, he instructs Grant to persuade her to accept the deal. Over the coming weeks, Grant and Julie's fling continues and eventually Julie decides to sell the lease, which is when Phil moves in with his offer. While Julie is waiting to meet Grant in The Vic one night, Phil tries to persuade her to sell him the lease. Julie realises that the Mitchell brothers have been using her, and she throws a drink in Phil's face and threatens to castrate Grant when he also tries to coax her into selling.

Despite her hostility towards the Mitchell brothers, Julie still wants to sell the lease and is forced to do business with them, but in revenge, insists on £1000 more than Grant originally offered. Grant agrees reluctantly and the Mitchells lose their cut of the payment from their associate. After securing her victory, Julie closes her salon and returns to Salford in March 1990.
