= Kathy Beale =

Fictional character from EastEnders

- EastEnders character
- Portrayed by: Gillian Taylforth
- Duration: 1985–2000, 2015–present
- First appearance: Episode 1 "Poor Old Reg"; 19 February 1985
- Created by: Julia Smith and Tony Holland
- Introduced by: Julia Smith (1985); Matthew Robinson (1999); Dominic Treadwell-Collins (2015)
- Book appearances: Swings and Roundabouts (1985); Blind Spots (1986); Hopes and Horizons (1987); Solid Ground (1988)
- Spin-off appearances: Dimensions in Time (1993); The Mitchells - Naked Truths (1998) The Ghosts of Ian Beale (2014); The Queen Vic Quiz Night (2020); TV Soundtracks EastEnders: The Six (2023)
In-universe information
- Other names: Kathy Mitchell; Kathy Sullivan; Kathy Richards; Kathy Cotton
- Occupation: Samaritan; Barmaid; Market trader Laundrette assistant Businesswoman; Landlady; Cashier; Café owner Chip shop worker Chef; Waitress
- Family: Beale/Mitchell
- Father: Dennis Hills
- Mother: Brenda Hills
- Brothers: Ted Hills; Colin Hills; Johnathan Hills
- Sisters: Stephanie Hills
- Husband: Pete Beale (until 1991); Phil Mitchell (1995–1999); Gavin Sullivan (2001–2016); Tom "Rocky" Cotton (2023, void)
- Sons: Ian Beale; Ben Mitchell
- Daughters: Donna Ludlow
- Stepsons: David Wicks; Zack Hudson
- Stepdaughters: Sharon Watts
- Grandsons: Peter Beale; Bobby Beale; Steven Beale (adoptive)
- Granddaughters: Lucy Beale; Lexi Pearce
- Nephews: Tony Hills
- Nieces: Sarah Hills
- Other relatives: Louie Beale; Jimmy Beale; AJ Branning (adoptive)

Kathy Beale (also Mitchell, Sullivan and Cotton) is a fictional character from the BBC soap opera EastEnders, played by Gillian Taylforth. Portrayed as "an attractive, bright, caring and highly moral woman", Kathy is one of the serial's original characters, appearing in the first episode of EastEnders on 19 February 1985. She was created as the second wife of Pete Beale (Peter Dean) and mother of their son, Ian Beale (Adam Woodyatt). Taylforth was originally dismissed for the role of Kathy due to her young age, but was reconsidered when she impressed show bosses. The actress opted to leave the serial in 1997 and Kathy departed on 10 April 1998 after deciding to move to South Africa with her second son Ben Mitchell. Kathy returned for two separate guest stints in 1999, making her departure on 6 January 2000. Despite reports that Taylforth would be returning to the serial, Kathy was supposedly killed off-screen in a road collision in 2006 to facilitate Ben's reintroduction to the serial. Taylforth reprised the role for a charity special "The Ghosts of Ian Beale" in 2014. In the episode broadcast on 19 February 2015 to celebrate the show's 30th anniversary, Kathy made a surprise return to the soap, despite being presumed dead. It was confirmed that Kathy would be making a full-time return, and – after a guest appearance on 19 May 2015 – Kathy returned permanently on 17 August 2015. Taylforth was initially hesitant about her reintroduction storyline, which was inspired by the John Darwin disappearance case. Taylforth appeared in her 2,000th episode on 22 May 2023.

Kathy remained in a prominent role throughout her original stint on the serial, including a friendship with Angie Watts (Anita Dobson), and featuring in high-profiled storylines involving her rape at the hands of James Willmott-Brown (William Boyde) and the discovery of a long-lost daughter, Donna Ludlow (Matilda Ziegler), after she was sexually assaulted as a teenager. In 1993, following the character's marriage with her husband Pete ended with the latter's departure from the square, Kathy developed a romance with Phil Mitchell (Steve McFadden). Their relationship suffered when Phil had an affair with his sister-in-law Sharon Watts (Letitia Dean) — a storyline popularly dubbed "Sharongate". Kathy and Phil later had a son, Ben, who contracts a rare form of meningitis. The relationship between alcohol abuse and domestic violence was explored through Kathy and Phil in 1997, which led to their separation and Kathy's departure. In her 1999 return, she had a brief fling with Phil's brother and Sharon's husband, Grant Mitchell (Ross Kemp).

Following her return in 2015, Kathy's third spouse Gavin Sullivan (Paul Nicholas) was introduced and their turbulent marriage was explored. Kathy later becomes critical in the events surrounding Max Branning's (Jake Wood) revenge campaign against Albert Square – in light of the "Who Killed Lucy Beale?" saga – when Willmott-Brown returned in his plan to recoup his relationship with Kathy by taking control of the square for her. Additionally, Kathy has relationships and flings with Buster Briggs (Karl Howman), Masood Ahmed (Nitin Ganatra), Harvey Monroe (Ross Boatman) and Tom "Rocky" Cotton (Brian Conley) and conflicts with both Max and his wife Rainie Cross (Tanya Franks) over the custody of her grandson Steven Beale's (Aaron Sidwell) daughter, Abi Branning, with Sharon over her relationship with Ian, and Rocky's niece Dotty Cotton (Milly Zero), who attempts to con her with Rocky. Kathy and Rocky marry, but Rocky ends up committing bigamy in the process, as his divorce from his first wife, Jo Cotton (Vicki Michelle), was never finalised. Kathy and Rocky later split when she discovers that he burned her café in an insurance scam which nearly killed her grandsons, Peter (Thomas Law) and Bobby Beale (Clay Milner Russell). In 2023, Kathy helps to cover up the murder of Keanu Taylor (Danny Walters) in "The Six" storyline. Kathy also resumes her feud with Cindy Beale (Michelle Collins), which had previously occurred in the 1990s; Kathy then became a suspect in the "Who Attacked Cindy?" storyline and is ultimately revealed to be Cindy's attacker in the show's 40th anniversary special.

== Creation ==
=== Background ===
Kathy Beale was one of the original twenty-three characters invented by the creators of EastEnders, Tony Holland and Julia Smith. Kathy was a member of the first family of EastEnders, the Beales and Fowlers. Holland took the inspiration for some of the series' earliest characters from his own London family and background. Kathy's original character outline as written by Smith and Holland appeared in an abridged form in their book, EastEnders: The Inside Story.

"A hard childhood. An overcrowded, strict one - with no money but bags of misery. You either give into that, or you rebel...A lot of people think she's hard. The exterior is certainly tough - it's had to be. From a childhood surrounded by too many brothers, a heavy drinking father, and a submissive mother. A knowledge that you came from the "slum end" of the borough. The tattiest school-uniform. The least money. To be the poorest of the poor was a hell of a thing to fight against...by patience, persistence, cool dignity, the refusal to argue and fight back like a fishwife, wooing, cajoling and setting a good example, she and Pete finally became accepted - even by Lou...a moral woman with a firm sense of right and wrong, and good and bad. She finds it almost impossible to tell a lie, bitch - or accept the goods Pete sometimes brings home that have fallen off the back of lorries. It's as if she's had such a long hard fight to be thought of and accepted as a respectable/decent person, that she's frightened of anything happening that might soil that image. A great sense of humour...She's practical in that she doesn't shatter Pete's dreams even though she knows none of them will ever materialise, because she realises to do so would also shatter him...Kathy never forgets a favour." (page 55–56)

=== Casting ===
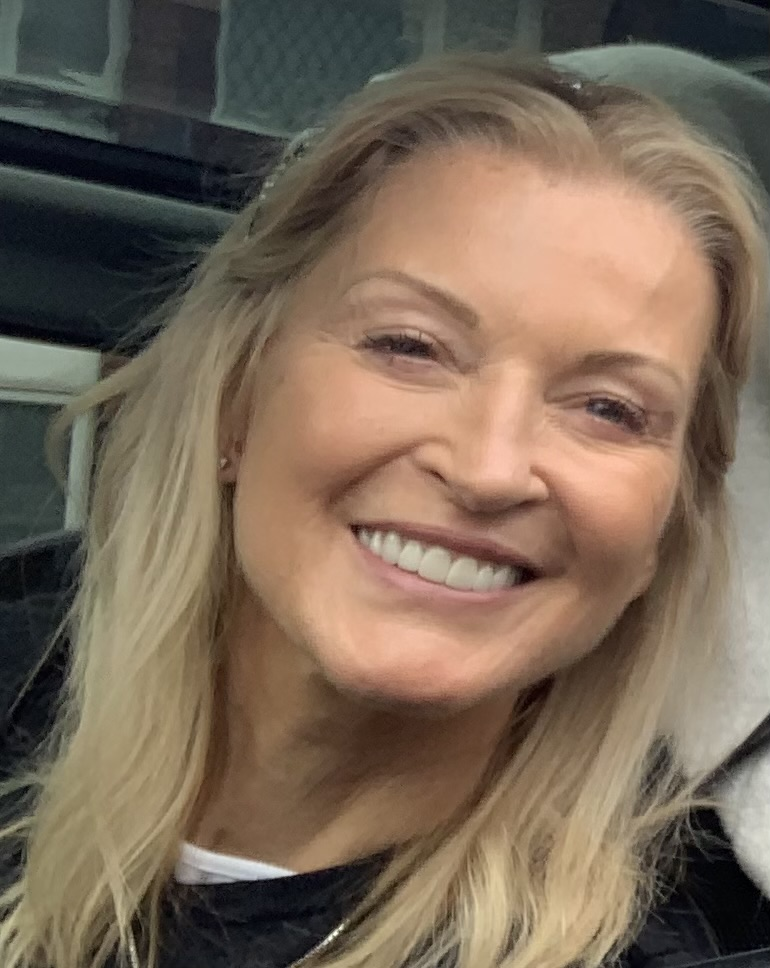
Taylforth (pictured) portrays Kathy.

Holland and Smith wanted Kathy to be attractive, warm, practical, tough, funny and sexy. More actresses were interviewed for the role of Kathy than any other original character. Each actress possessed some of the facets of personality wanted, but not a single one had all of them. Gillian Taylforth was an actress that Smith and Holland had encountered during an open evening they had attended at The Anna Scher Theatre in Islington, North London. They had been drawn to Taylforth because of her voice — "husky and adenoidal", which seemed at odds with her feminine appearance, which they described as "stunningly attractive". During the open evening, they considered Taylforth for the role of Sue Osman, but she was dismissed because she was blonde rather than brunette. They briefly considered her for the role of Kathy, but she was again dismissed because she was too young for the role. They instead decided "to bear her in mind for the future".

Despite this, during the casting period in 1984, Taylforth auditioned for the role of Sue Osman. She was unsuccessful and that part went to Sandy Ratcliff, however, Holland and Smith asked her back to audition for another role, the part of Kathy. Smith and Holland have commented that "she came into the room, bringing the whole of the 'East-end' in with her [...] In exactly half a minute she'd charmed the pants off them". She was considered perfect, apart from her age. Smith and Holland have commented in their book Inside Story that "[Taylforth] was too young! They had said so from the beginning. By rights, they should not even be interviewing her. But wasn't she perfect, apart from her age? So different from any other 'Kathy' they had seen. Fresher. More down to earth. Ages were discussed and a pocket-calculator produced. If Pete Beale had been her first boyfriend, wasn't it just possible that she could have a fourteen-year-old son? Julia and Tony were trying to talk themselves into it." Taylforth has commented on the audition process, "[Holland and Smith] whipped out a calculator and kept punching in numbers. 'We're trying to work out if you could be old enough to be Ian's Mum,' they said. I said, 'I can look older. I'll put my hair up. I'll have a few late nights and I promise I'll look old enough to be Ian's Mum'." According to Holland and Smith, Gillian Taylforth's "freshness and earthy charm" won them around and she was offered the part of Kathy.

== Development ==
=== Personality ===
Author Christine Geraghty has described Kathy as a character that could "be trusted by the audience to divine what is right and to hold firmly to that position". Described as a woman who naturally worked on behalf of the community, other characters frequently turned to Kathy for advice or support, and this was explored on-screen to greater effect in the 1980s when, as a result of the hardship she had faced in her youth, Kathy volunteered with the charity group the Samaritans. It has been noted that "as a result of becoming a counsellor for The Samaritans Kathy Beale 'in turn [...] increasingly [came] to adopt the role of expert advisor".

Hilary Kingsley, author of The EastEnders Handbook, described Kathy in 1991 as "an attractive, bright, caring and highly moral woman, vulnerable but tough in some ways, streetwise, amusing, even witty [...] What she thinks is what she says.". She adds that she is "Blonde, good-looking, intelligent and industrious, on the surface Kathy's a very together lady. Underneath, though, things are very different." Kathy has been classified by Rupert Smith, author of EastEnders: 20 years in Albert Square, as a "drama queen", a "strong passionate [woman] who [goes] to pieces where men are concerned and always [comes] back for more". He continued, "One woman above all others has taken it on the chin in EastEnders, and that's Kathy." Author Kate Lock has noted that by the time of Kathy's last appearance, she had "acquired near-goddess status".

=== Rape ===
One of the most notable storylines involving Kathy was her rape by yuppie bar owner James Willmott-Brown, played by William Boyde. It was the second time that the character had been raped, as Kathy's backstory had revealed that she had been raped at the age of fourteen, resulting in a pregnancy — Kathy gave her baby daughter, Donna Ludlow (Matilda Ziegler), away for adoption, although these events were not seen on-screen, as Kathy was already in her 30s when the serial began. Taylforth has revealed that she was apprehensive about the storyline when it was originally pitched. She has commented to the Walford Gazette, "I didn't think it was a great idea at first. That Kathy was being raped for the second time in her life bothered me. And second, I didn't think Wilmott-Brown was a very likely rapist. I loved working with William Boyde, and I thought he played it brilliantly. It was his idea to step up Wilmott-Brown's drinking in order for the rape to make some sense."

The storyline was set up during 1988, as Kathy found employment at James's wine bar, "The Dagmar", causing friction between Kathy and her husband Pete who "didn't like the pub, the clientele or the clothes Kathy felt she had to wear to look good for work". As James struggled with various personal and business issues simultaneously, he began to show an attraction to Kathy, leading to the storyline's eventual climax, Kathy's rape. Writer Colin Brake has commented that "all the pieces [were] in place [...] Pete was away [...] Willmott-Brown asked Kathy to stay after work for a drink. The situation got out of hand and what began as seduction ended in rape." The episodes covering the rape were written by Tony McHale and are considered by the writer Colin Brake as "EastEnders at its best". Some 19 million viewers tuned in to see Kathy attacked in The Dagmar wine bar's upstairs flat, on 7 July 1988, in episode 357, reportedly 2 million more than the average viewership at the time.

One of the episodes covering the rape received criticism for showing the police as unsympathetic and unhelpful to a rape victim. Metropolitan Police Commissioner, Sir Peter Imbert, said a scene in which Kathy was questioned following her rape was "out of date and would do nothing to encourage reporting this despicable crime". The story, however, continued in the next episode, when Kathy reached the police station and received very sympathetic treatment from a male detective and a WPC. Tony McHale had researched the subject in depth with the police and was determined to portray the broad range of ways that the police dealt with the serious subject of rape. A senior woman police officer later congratulated the programme on its even-handed and honest portrayal of the incident.

The storyline has generally been received well by critics. The Guardian newspaper described the storyline as "a slow-burn as the tension rose over weeks and months [...] which culminated in rape and then followed Kathy sensitively through the aftermath." This included the consequences for Willmott-Brown; the BBC maintains that with their rape storylines, "the consequences of the crime are always explored, both for the attacker and the victim." While in March 2008, Gareth McLean of The Guardian used Kathy Beale's rape as one of only two instances of a drama series that dealt with the subject "remotely realistically", the other being Sheila Grant's (Sue Johnston) rape in Channel 4's Brookside. However, one prominent critic of the storyline was Mary Whitehouse of the National Viewers' and Listeners' Association. Following the airing of the rape episode in 1988, Whitehouse branded it "totally unsuitable for family viewing". She wrote to the then Home Secretary, Douglas Hurd, to try to stop the episode being repeated in the soap's weekly Sunday omnibus, suggesting that it violated the BBC's own code of practice.

Kathy was later reunited with James Willmott-Brown in 1992 in a special three-hander episode also featuring Pete. Written by Debbie Cook, this episode allowed Kathy to finally lay to rest the ghost of her rape and convince Pete that their marriage was truly over. Colin Brake has said that "it also gave Gillian Taylforth a terrific acting challenge". In the on-screen events, Kathy was shown to leave the serial for five months to stay with her brother and recover from the trauma of seeing James again; however, in reality, actress Gillian Taylforth had to be written out of the serial to go on maternity leave.

=== Domestic violence ===
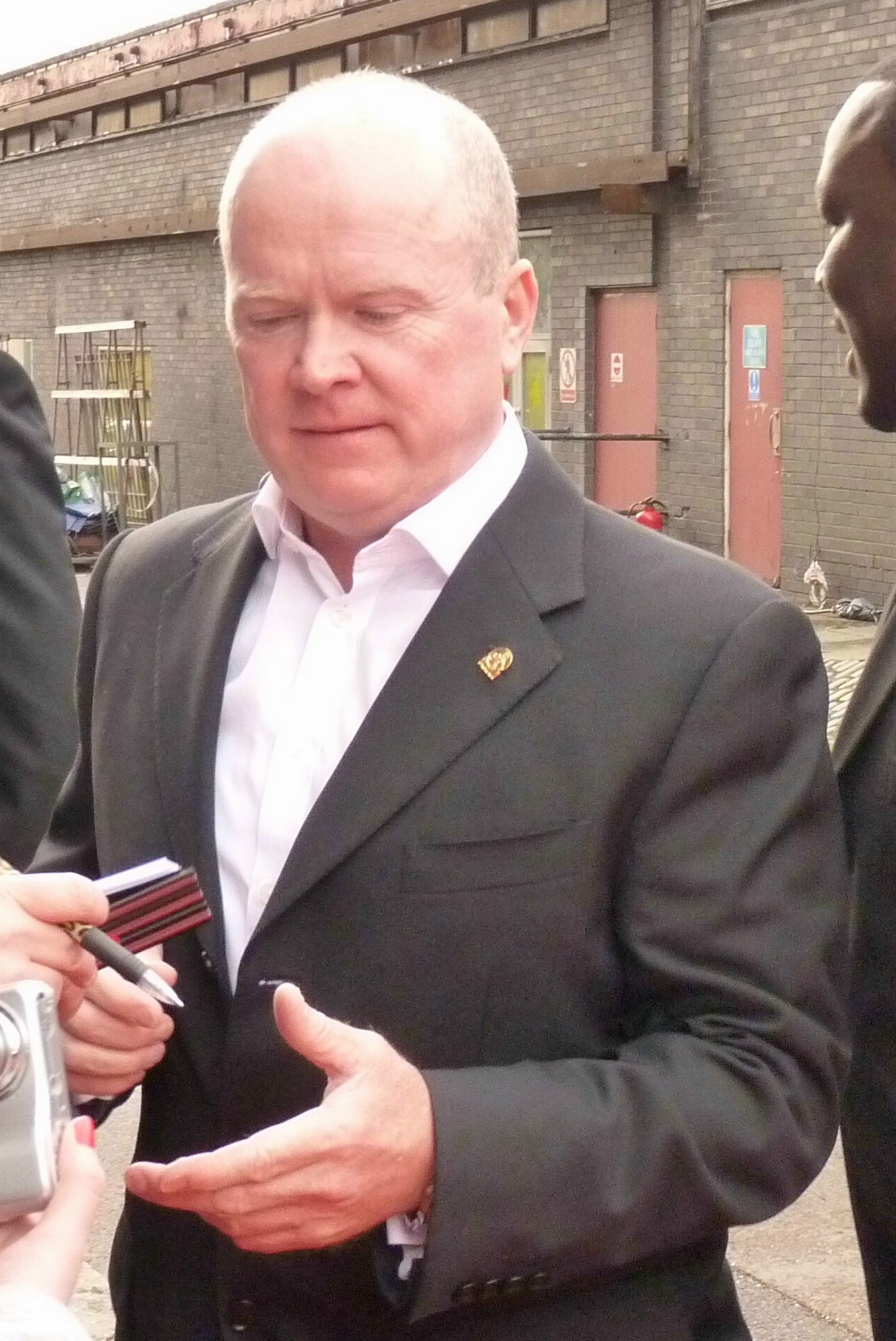
McFadden (pictured) plays Kathy's second husband, Phil Mitchell.

In 1993, Kathy was romantically paired with the character Phil Mitchell, played by Steve McFadden. Writer Colin Brake has revealed that this liaison had first been suggested by the EastEnders' script department three years prior, in 1990, but the idea had been rejected in favour of Kathy getting involved with pub landlord Eddie Royle (Michael Melia).

Despite various obstacles, including objection from Kathy's son, Ian Beale (Adam Woodyatt), and the public unveiling of Phil's prior affair with his sister-in-law, Sharon Watts (Letitia Dean), Phil and Kathy married in 1995 and a baby was written into their narratives the following year; Kathy becoming a mother again for the third time at the age of 46. The storyline was used to spread a public message, when Kathy's baby son Ben (Matthew Silver) contracted a rare form of meningitis, leaving him with impaired hearing and the threat of brain damage. Kathy was shown to "irrationally" blame herself for her son's condition. In 1996, Gillian Taylforth summarised her character's fears: "[Ben]'s not been very well since he was born and Kathy hasn't wanted to leave him for a minute." Ian McKee, journalist for the Daily Record added that "Ben fell ill when his mum was out for the evening. Irrationally, Kathy blames herself - but she won't trust him with anyone else" and according to Dr Richard Lansdown of London University's Institute of Child Health, "Such extreme anxiety is only natural [...] This constant checking is very, very common when children are seriously ill." Kathy's concern for Ben was shown to have a negative effect on her relationship with Phil, leading into the start of the couple's most notable storyline, Phil's descent into alcoholism and the consequences the condition has upon the sufferer's domestic life.

The relationship between alcohol abuse and domestic violence was explored between Phil and Kathy culminating in the slow deterioration of their marriage, which the BBC claims "gripped viewers" throughout 1997. It has been noted that EastEnders were attempting to spread the message that abusive relationships are transmitted from one generation to the next within this storyline. Phil is eventually shown to blame "his destructiveness on a response to self-hate: violence [...] the basis of his problem: his father had beaten him as a kid and he fears that he will do the same to his son."

=== Initial departure and return (1998) ===
In November 1997, the press revealed that after 13 years playing Kathy, Gillian Taylforth had opted not to renew her contract when it expired in March 1998. Taylforth commented, "I love EastEnders, it's in my blood. But after 12 years I want a bit of a change. I want to spend more time with my family and consider other offers. It was an extremely difficult decision to make but I felt this was the best time to go. I've had alternative job offers in the past, but I've always stuck with EastEnders. It's been brilliant for me and I will miss it hugely." At the time, a BBC spokesperson would not confirm the departure saying, "Gilly is in discussions about taking a possible break. It is the policy that long-serving, valued, senior cast members are eligible for such breaks." However, her departure was later confirmed, with Taylforth saying that she made the decision to quit after she missed her daughter's sports day due to filming commitments on set. Barbara Windsor, who plays Kathy's mother-in-law Peggy Mitchell, said: "This is really sad. Gill is a wonderful actress and a very good friend." McFadden said: "I can't believe it. I've been with her all day and she never said a thing."

The character's exit storyline revolved around her broken marriage to Phil, a prominent storyline that had been heavily featured throughout 1997. After deciding to leave Walford with her son Ben for South Africa, Kathy found herself the object of desire from several Walford residents, all keen for her to stay and form a relationship. One of the men was Grant Mitchell, her husband Phil's brother, who Kathy shared a kiss with. Despite indicating to Phil that she was prepared to give their relationship one last try, he failed to rendezvous with her in time, and although he made it to the airport, he was persuaded to let her go by Ian. Kathy was shown to depart the serial on an aeroplane after a "poignant scene" showing her embracing her son Ian. The episodes marking Kathy's exit were screened in a one-hour special on Good Friday 10 April 1998. The episodes were also notable for being the last appearance of Cindy Beale (Michelle Collins). Despite the high-profile exits, the episodes were beaten in the ratings by rival soap Coronation Street, which garnered 14 million viewers. It had been reported that EastEnders' producers had been hoping to topple the ratings success of Coronation Street's popular "Free Deirdre" storyline, the jailing of Deirdre Barlow, portrayed by Anne Kirkbride, for a crime she did not commit.

When Taylforth quit, she originally suggested that she was only taking a six-month break and would return in October 1998; however, this did not occur. It was reported in the press in August 1998, that only several months after her departure, EastEnders producers attempted to woo Taylforth back for a "week-long saga" to do a "Who's the daddy?" storyline, with Phil, Grant Mitchell (Ross Kemp) and Alex Healy (Richard Driscoll) all possible candidates for the father of Kathy's baby. Taylforth reportedly declined the offer in order to take other roles.

In a 2000 interview with the Sunday Mirror, Taylforth commented further on her decision to leave the serial: "I left EastEnders because after 13 years I felt I really needed a break. I wanted to do other things and I knew I wasn't getting any younger. But throughout everything that has happened in my life I have had tremendous support from the people in EastEnders. I love them so dearly. I still keep in touch with some of them, and my line when I left the show was, 'I won't say goodbye, just au revoir', and that is how I feel. It is nice that they have left the door open for Kathy to return."

=== Off-screen death ===
After her final departure, numerous rumours circulated in the British press predicting the character's return to the soap. In 2005 it was reported that EastEnders producers were attempting to lure Gillian Taylforth back with the offer of a £200,000 a year pay cheque. Gillian said: "I've always wanted to go back because I love EastEnders — I have great friends in the cast and always enjoyed working with Steve McFadden." However, in January 2006 it was announced that the character was being killed off-screen in a storyline to facilitate the return of her young son Ben to his father Phil Mitchell. Taylforth has commented: "I was a bit upset at first because it was 13 years of my life and I didn't like the thought of being killed off. I thought she might come back to see Ian and have some illness. But that's the way it goes." In 2010, Taylforth said that she wished that Kathy could come back from the dead and that it was a mistake to kill her off. Earlier that year executive producer Diederick Santer revealed that he would like to have brought back Kathy from the dead but vowed not to revive deceased characters. Taylforth reiterated her desire to return to EastEnders in 2013 and that she heard a writer in 2011 saying that producers wanted her to return and asked her if she could think of a way to bring Kathy back. She revealed that producer John Yorke told her that killing off Kathy was "one of the biggest mistakes they've ever made", and the writer who had decided to kill off Kathy regretted it afterwards, though said it was a "good idea at the time". In 2014, Taylforth revealed that she doubts whether Kathy is really dead and said that many EastEnders viewers have written with proposed storylines on how she could make a return to the show.

=== Reintroduction (2015) and relationship with Gavin Sullivan ===
The thought to be deceased character made an unannounced return during a live segment which aired on 19 February 2015, during EastEnders Live Week, commemorating the 30th anniversary of the serial. Prior to this, a few days before, The Metro predicted that Kathy could return from the dead after Phil appeared to desperately want to tell Ian something. It was confirmed that this was just a guest return, but she would return permanently later in 2015. Also, after the airing, the official EastEnders Twitter account posted a tweet, calling Kathy a "living legend" and stating that she is returning.

Taylforth was interviewed on her return. She said, "When Dominic approached me with his plan, I was so shocked I got into my car and burst into tears! Kathy has always been so close to my heart and it’s absolutely wonderful to be returning to the show and reprising the role." Speaking on EastEnders: Backstage Live, after the live episode ended, Taylforth also said about returning, "It's been fantastic. When Dom [Treadwell-Collins] and Julia Crampsie phoned, I was in shock for ages. It's been very hard keeping it a secret, especially from my children. They've been going, 'Oh mum, so-and-so has died and come back, why can't you?' I've said, 'I'm dead!'"

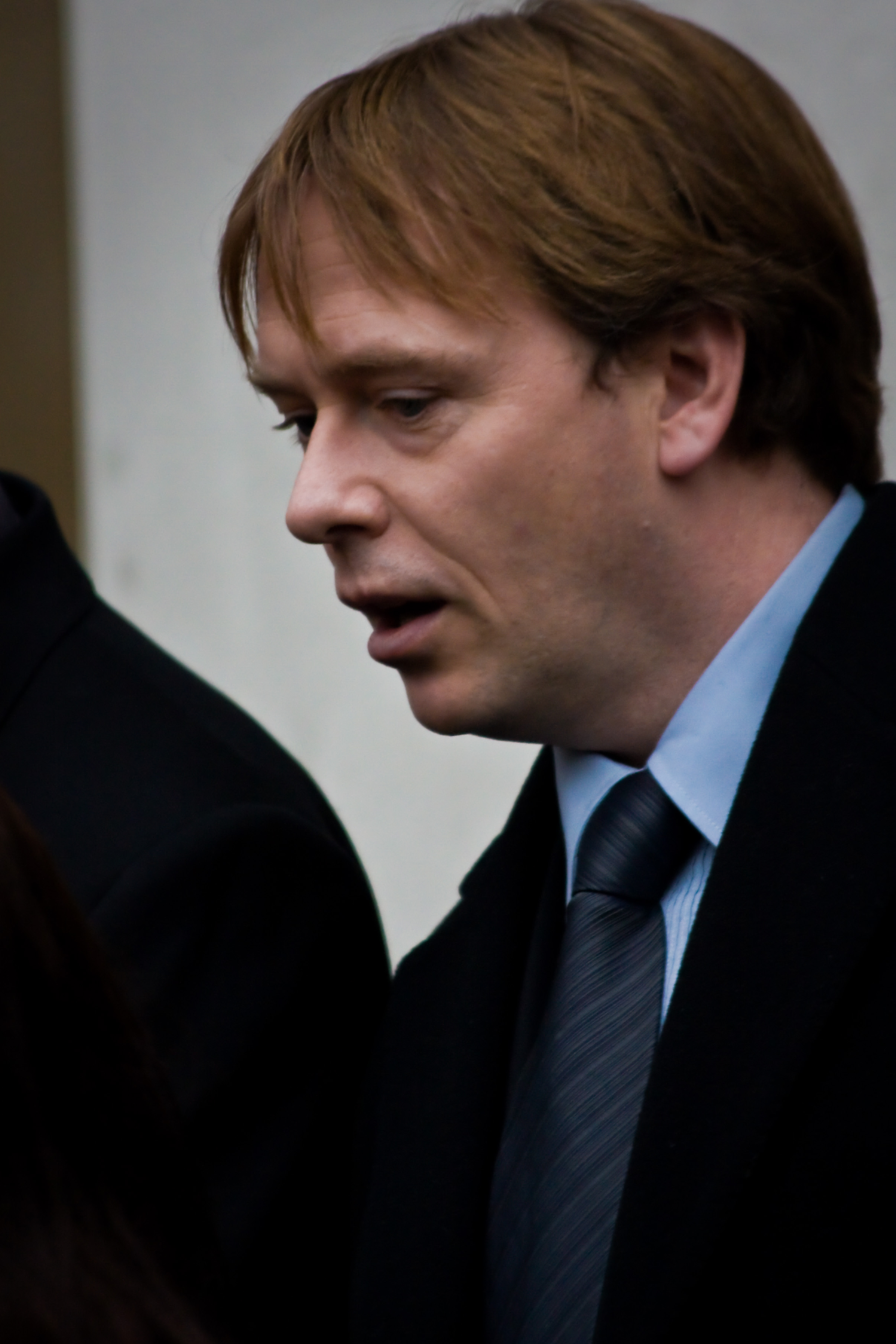
Woodyatt (pictured) played a role in Kathy's return.

The producer of EastEnders, Treadwell-Collins, described Kathy's return as "one of EastEnders’ most earth-shattering storylines ever." After the episode, that sees Kathy return, aired, Treadwell-Collins teased the storyline, saying, "I have always made my feelings on Kathy Beale and Gillian Taylforth very clear – she is part of EastEnders history, mother to Ian and Ben [Mitchell] and one of the most important and iconic television characters on British television." He added, "Six months ago, we set ourselves the challenge of bringing Kathy back to the Square in a credible way. And I believe we have succeeded. Viewers will have to keep watching to find out exactly why Kathy ‘died’, where she has been all these years and why she now wants to come home to Albert Square." Treadwell-Collins opened up about how he told Woodyatt (Ian) about Taylforth's return. He said, "I told him, 'Look, we're bringing someone back'. He looked at me and he went, 'Not my mum?'" He continued, "He broke, and he started sobbing and sobbing and sobbing. He looked at me and said, 'Really? That's all I ever wanted, all I ever wanted is for my mum to come back'." Woodyatt said on Taylforth's return, "I’m thrilled, I couldn’t be happier. I’ve finally got my mum back! I’ve been keeping this secret for so long and now I just can’t wait to work with her again." Woodyatt also called working with Taylforth a "dream come true".

On keeping the return a secret, Taylforth said, "Keeping it secret has been awful. The only person who knew was my other half Dave." She added, "I was saying to my children the other day, ‘Try and watch EastEnders, it’s live and Adam Woodyatt is going to do something really silly. I thought that would get them watching it, but my daughter said, ‘I’m working until 9pm’ and my son said he was playing football over the rec." She also revealed that she didn't even tell her siblings. Kathy's return scene was also shot on location, to keep the return a secret for as long as possible. In rehearsals for the scene, they used a stand-in to do Kathy's line. This was Anna Acton, who played Emma Summerhayes, only a month before.

In April, it was announced that Kathy would be making another guest return, ahead of her permanent one. Treadwell-Collins stated, "We’ve storylined her return properly. You’ll see a flash of Kathy again fairly soon and then boom!" He also confirmed that Taylforth has already "filmed her next little tease." He added, "We know that there was a Gavin that she went off with. It’s a big, big story with a lot of twists and turns, as you’ve come to expect from us. There’s Gavin, Kathy and there’s a lot of Phil involved." In this statement, Treadwell-Collins confirmed that viewers would be introduced to Kathy's husband, Gavin Sullivan, but no details were given. She returned for a one-off episode on 19 May 2015. In May, Digital Spy interviewed Woodyatt. The topic of Kathy's return came into conversation. When asked his reaction when he found out that Taylforth was returning, he said, "I was just overwhelmed. I couldn't believe it. Dom [Treadwell-Collins] turned around and said, 'Trust me, it's convincing'. I said, 'I don't care, I've got my mum back!' I can't wait to start working with her full-time again." Woodyatt also spoke to Radio Times. In this interview, he revealed that he actually found out before Taylforth did. He said, "We were all leaving [a meeting] and Dom [Treadwell-Collins] said to me that there was something else he needed to talk to me about. [...] And that's when he told me they were going to bring Kathy back. I was just overwhelmed. I couldn’t have been happier hearing that news." He continued, "But the biggest problem I had was that I’d kept in touch with Gillian Taylforth the whole time she’d been away. And all of a sudden, when she was texting me over Christmas, I couldn’t reply. Because I knew about Kathy and she didn't. Gilly was still in the dark. Dom was so desperate to keep it secret that he didn’t even ask Gilly until the middle of January. Secrecy was just so important. I’d even given him her mobile number so we could bypass her agent. When we were finally able to speak to each other about it, we both just ended up screaming with joy down the phone line."

In June, it was announced that Paul Nicholas had been cast to play Gavin. It was said that he would have a "major role" in Kathy's permanent return, and that he would be a "formidable force". An EastEnders spokesperson teased the storyline saying, "Kathy will be back in Albert Square this autumn, but just what exactly are she and old flame Phil hiding? Where have Kathy and Gavin been? And why is Gavin being kept in the dark?" Later in the month, Taylforth and Nicholas were spotted filming scenes on-location, at King's Cross station. It wasn't revealed what was happening in the scenes and that was left for broadcast. The BBC then posted new filming pictures, which showed Nicholas and Taylforth getting in a plane, due to the characters planning to escape England. It was said that these scenes would air on-screen in September.

Harry Reid, who played Kathy's youngest son, Ben, said on Kathy's return, "I can’t wait for it to happen, I couldn’t believe it when I heard Kathy was coming back to face Ben. I struck lucky, didn’t I?" When talking about how Ben will react, Reid said, "I feel there’ll be more anger in Ben because of the lies and deceit that’s gone on, Ben wouldn’t be the person he is today if his mum hadn’t have died because he was a little boy who didn’t say boo to a goose then. Because he spent a few more years with Phil as his dad he finds himself in the nick twice and he’s become a very troubled and confused lad." When asked on how much of the storyline he knew, he said, "I know nothing about the story yet, which I like, so I get the surprise of it. It’s going to be interesting how they’re going to explain it all, but I think it’s going to be explosive. I don’t think everybody is going to take Kathy into their lives again, and it’s going to be interesting to see the difference between Ben and Ian, too, in how they deal with it."

Co-star, Nitin Ganatra, was asked in an interview, which other character he would like to be a love interest for his own character, Masood Ahmed. He said that he'd like to see Masood with Kathy. Talking to Radio Times, he said, "I would love Masood to get together with Kathy, partly because I've already been Gillian Taylforth's love interest in a show we did together for ITV called Jane Hall... She's a great actress, very watchable and a lot of fun to work with." Continuing on, he said, "I'd also be interested to see what the dynamic would be. I think it'd be different to what we've seen before, which is Masood being bossed around by women. I reckon Masood would be the tearaway while Kathy would be the reasonable one. It would be fun if it was Kathy trying to tame Masood."

In August, the BBC released more behind the scenes filming shots. The first set released showed Kathy and Ian's reunion, with Laurie Brett, playing Ian's wife, Jane Beale, also present. In the pictures, Ian is shown to be on the floor. It was theorised that Ian had fainted after seeing Kathy. Months later, on-screen, this is proved to be incorrect, when Ian is in fact hit by a car. The next set showed DCI Jill Marsden (Sophie Stanton) arresting Kathy, outside of Gavin's home, hinting that Gavin might also be arrested, though this was unconfirmed. Daniel Kilkelly from Digital Spy teased that "the arrest may not necessarily be bad news for Kathy."

Taylforth was initially hesitant about the storyline, explaining, "I couldn't understand how they could work around the fact that she could do that to her children". In September 2015, Treadwell-Collins said to the Daily Mirror that the story was inspired by the real life John Darwin disappearance case where John—also known as the Canoe man—with the help of his wife Anne faked his death in a canoe accident in March 2002 in order to claim the insurance. Gavin (Paul Nicholas) had convinced her to fake her death to keep her children safe.

=== Gay bar ===
In May 2019, it was announced that Kathy would open Walford's first gay bar.

=== Relationship with Tom "Rocky" Cotton ===
In July 2023, Taylforth spoke to Radio Times about Kathy and her husband, Tom Cotton's (Brian Conley) relationship and about Kathy finding out Tom was secretly already married to Jo Cotton (Vicki Michelle). She said that Kathy thinks "that they can get over this hurdle," and that she "loves Rocky and she thinks everything's gonna be rosy in the garden, and once the blackmail's out the way that's gonna be it; it's all gonna stop and everything in the garden's gonna be lovely."

== Storylines ==
=== 1985–2000 ===
Kathy and her husband, Pete Beale (Peter Dean), are financially stable and live in Walford with their teenage son Ian (Adam Woodyatt). Kathy works as a barmaid in The Queen Victoria pub with her best friend, Angie Watts (Anita Dobson), whilst helping Pete on their fruit and veg stall. Kathy feels she has put her troubled past behind her but Nick Cotton (John Altman) breaks into Kathy's doctor, Harold Legg's (Leonard Fenton) surgery and reads Kathy's medical records. He discovers that she gave a child, Donna Ludlow (Matilda Ziegler), the product of rape when Kathy was 14, up for adoption. Nick uses this to blackmail her, which eventually forces her to tell Pete her secret and he reacts badly. She later starts a knitting business. Mehmet Osman (Haluk Bilginer) asks Kathy to knit a batch of jumpers for him. Kathy finds out from Mehmet's brother, Ali Osman (Nejdet Salih), that she was conned when Mehmet disappears with the jumpers and money.

By then Kathy learns that Donna, now an adult, wants to meet her but she refuses. Undeterred, Donna moves to Walford, keeping her identity secret. To get closer to Kathy, Donna calls her workplace at The Samaritans and grows close to Kathy's son, Ian, who unknowingly becomes attracted to his half-sister. When Kathy tells Donna to stay away from Ian, Donna reveals that she is her daughter. Donna thinks Kathy will be pleased but Kathy is horrified and demands she leave Walford. Donna stays and causes various problems for Kathy. Finally, Kathy tells Donna that she is actually the product of rape; Kathy gave her up at birth and wants nothing to do with her now. Donna spends the rest of the year in a downward spiral.

Soon enough Kathy becomes close with her boss, James Willmott-Brown (William Boyde), which enrages Pete as a result, and the rift worsens when it becomes clear that Willmott-Brown is romantically interested in Kathy. After work, Willmott-Brown invites Kathy upstairs to his flat, but when he attempts to seduce her, Kathy tries to leave. Willmott-Brown refuses to let her leave and his attempted seduction ultimately ends in rape. Willmott-Brown is arrested and formally charged with rape. In the aftermath, Kathy becomes depressed and isolated from Pete, who never believes she is blameless so Kathy leaves him. Willmott-Brown stands trial but tries bribing Kathy to withdraw her statement. Kathy pretends to take his hush money but tells the police so a listening DI tapes the conversation. She is forced to relive the rape for the trial, where a skilful barrister presents a good case for Willmott-Brown. For a time it seems Willmott-Brown could be acquitted, but to Kathy's relief, he is convicted and imprisoned for three years. During this time, Kathy finds unexpected support from Pete's first wife, Pat Wicks (Pam St Clement), whom she had initially resented and they become close friends.

However, Kathy still refuses to accept Donna. This causes Donna to sink into depression and overdoses on heroin and dies, leaving Kathy wrestling with guilt. Kathy attempts to move on and begins a relationship with market trader, Laurie Bates (Gary Powell). Their relationship manages to survive the interference of Julie Cooper (Louise Plowright), who tries but fails to claim Laurie for herself. However, when Laurie begins buying Kathy extravagant clothing and jewellery, she questions his motives, thinking he's trying to make her look like his late wife, and loses interest. Laurie takes her rejection badly and some tactless comments regarding her sexual abstinence makes Kathy believe he has deceived her of his true nature. She ends the relationship. Later in the year, Kathy begins dating publican Eddie Royle (Michael Melia). He patiently pursues her, but after a few dates, she becomes hesitant and after she sees him kissing Eibhlin O'Donnell (Mary Conlon) – his former girlfriend visiting from Ireland – their lukewarm romance ends.

It is then Kathy persuades The Samaritans to take her back as a volunteer, on the condition she is shadowed following her previous stint. Disa O'Brien (Jan Graveson) phones The Samaritans and tells Kathy that her baby, Billie, is the product of rape and fathered by Disa's stepfather, Ken Raynor (Ian Redford). Willmott-Brown is released from prison. He sends Kathy a tape telling her that he wants to meet her and that he has changed. Kathy pleads with him to leave and never return but he moves to the Square and continues to pester her, until Kathy relays the hurt and anger he had caused her, gaining some closure. Willmott-Brown threatens suicide but Kathy stops him, refusing to let him take the easy way out. After a heated conversation in which Willmott-Brown pleads for forgiveness, Kathy convinces him to leave Walford. She also convinces Pete — who has been hoping for reconciliation — that their marriage is over. Later, Kathy begins a relationship with market inspector, Richard Cole (Ian Reddington), which sours when she discovers that he is taking a cash bribe and allowing a mobile hot dog van to trade in direct competition with her café.

After admitting his feelings for her whilst in France, Kathy begins a romance with mechanic Phil Mitchell (Steve McFadden). At first their relationship manages to survive through various revelations about Phil's criminal activity, as well as interference from Phil's wife, Nadia Mitchell (Anna Barkan), who tries to split them up. Phil proposes to Kathy and she accepts, but during their engagement party, Kathy learns that Phil had resumed an affair with his sister-in-law, Sharon Mitchell (Letitia Dean) after his brother, Grant Mitchell (Ross Kemp), obtained a tape of a drunken Sharon and her best friend, Michelle Fowler (Susan Tully), Pete's niece, discussing the affair. After Grant plays the tape, the revelation ends Kathy's friendship with Sharon, leads to Phil being beaten by his brother, and almost ends Kathy and Phil's relationship. It also causes a strain between Kathy and Michelle, and Kathy is hurt about Michelle taking Sharon's side, believing that, as family, Michelle should have told her. Kathy is cold towards Michelle's initial efforts to make amends, but they soon make up.

Phil and Kathy sort out their differences and get married in secret in early 1995. Kathy keeps fainting and refuses to see Dr Legg, she relents and is told she is pregnant. Phil is overjoyed about becoming a father, as is Phil's mother, Peggy Mitchell (Barbara Windsor). Kathy goes into labour with Pat helping her and Phil meets their son shortly after he is born. Kathy is opposed to Peggy's name suggestion of Eric, named after Phil and Grant's father and Peggy's husband, Eric Mitchell (George Russo), and names him Ben Mitchell (Matthew Silver). Kathy's niece, Sarah Hills (Daniela Denby-Ashe), and Sarah's boyfriend, Robbie Jackson (Dean Gaffney), look after Ben when he becomes ill and at hospital, he is diagnosed with meningitis. Grant, reveals that Mark Fowler (Todd Carty), the husband of Ben's childminder, Ruth Fowler (Caroline Paterson) and Michelle's brother, has AIDS. Despite Kathy panicking that the AIDS caused the meningitis, she is reassured the conditions are not linked. Kathy and Phil are told that Ben has been left partially deaf in one ear. At the same time, Kathy suspects that Ian's wife Cindy Beale (Michelle Collins) is cheating on him once again and they become sworn archenemies in a longstanding feud between them. Kathy's suspicions are eventually proven true and she is outraged when Cindy arranges a hitman to kill Ian, but that is successful and Kathy helps nurse Ian back to health.

By Autumn 1996, Kathy is devoted to Ben; feeling neglected, Phil turns to alcohol. By the end of the year, his drinking has developed into alcoholism and he becomes violent toward Kathy at one point. After he snatches Ben and leaves him near a fire while he passes out drunk, Kathy leaves him. Realising what he has lost, Phil tries to stop drinking and rebuild his marriage. Kathy takes him back but when Phil attends counselling, he cheats on Kathy by sleeping with a fellow alcoholic, Lorna Cartwright (Janet Dibley), who starts stalking him and makes herself known to Kathy. Eventually Phil takes Kathy to Paris, hoping that it will bring them closer. However, Phil confesses to his betrayal and Kathy responds by slapping him. She then throws her wedding ring into the Seine, stating their marriage is "the biggest mistake" of her life. Phil begins sleeping rough and blames Kathy for his decline. Despite momentarily contemplating suicide, Kathy hardens herself towards her husband's decline.

Sometime later Kathy starts a secret romance with vicar, Alex Healy (Richard Driscoll). It is then Alex's Bishop discovers their dalliance and offers Alex a choice: Kathy or his job. Alex is prepared to give up his job to be with Kathy but she has second thoughts and considers moving to Cape Town, South Africa to live with her brother, Ted Hills (Brian Croucher). Her upcoming departure spurs proposals from not only Alex, but Grant, who asks her to elope, and Phil, who tries to reunite with her. Kathy grows confused by so many options but eventually tells Phil she is open to a reunion with him. However, he fails to meet her on the day of her planned departure, so Kathy leaves Walford with Ben.

In 1999, Kathy returns to meet Ian's fiancée, Melanie Healy (Tamzin Outhwaite) and ends up sleeping with Grant in a one-night stand between them. Just before she is due to return home to South Africa, Kathy asks Phil to leave with her. However, Grant has planned a robbery that same day and Phil cannot bring himself to let his brother do the job alone. Infuriated by Phil's loyalty to Grant, Kathy reveals their recent tryst, moments before she leaves. This results in a violent showdown between the brothers. Grant confesses that he only had sex with Kathy as revenge for Phil's affair with Sharon in the past. Phil responds by threatening to shoot Grant, devastated that he lost Ben (now played by Morgan Whittle) and Kathy again. This leads to Grant crashing their car into the River Thames but both survive. When Kathy returns again for Ian's short-lived wedding to Melanie, after Ian lied to Melanie about his daughter, Lucy Beale (Casey Anne Rothery), having cancer, and Melanie revealing she had a one-night stand with Phil's nemesis Steve Owen (Martin Kemp), she is met with hostility from Peggy as a result. Phil tries to persuade Kathy to reconcile one last time but they both agree their relationship is over and Kathy leaves Walford alone with Ben in the end. In 2001, Kathy marries a friend of Ted's called Gavin Sullivan (Paul Nicholas) in South Africa. Five years later, Ian hears that Kathy and Gavin have been killed in a traffic collision. Ian travels to South Africa and returns with Ben (now played by Charlie Jones); eventually Phil gains custody of Ben.

=== 2015–present ===
After being released from a short stint in prison, Phil attempts to tell Ian privately on his wedding day that Kathy is alive, but cannot go through with it when Ben (now played by Harry Reid) walks in on their conversation. Phil later meets Kathy in secret and tells her that, despite her wishes, he cannot allow her to return home, concerned about the effect on Ben and Ian. A few months later, Phil meets her in a café, and hands her an envelope of cash, with the promise this is the last payment he has for her. Seemingly out of the blue, months on, Kathy visits Phil at his garage in Walford, begging for fake documentation for Gavin, so she can reveal that she faked her death, without implicating him. Phil agrees to help her leave London and meets her at St Pancras International, but Sharon, who is now married to Phil, arrives, suspecting he is meeting someone he is having an affair with. Ian accompanies her and Kathy disappears, having spotted Ian for the first time in 10 years. As she leaves, she runs into Gavin, who has been aware of her plan all along. Phil's cousin, Ronnie Mitchell (Samantha Womack), discovers Kathy is alive, and Phil has been aware for three years, since Ben went to prison for murdering Heather Trott (Cheryl Fergison).

Several weeks later, Kathy has escaped Gavin, and she contacts her old friend, Tracey (Jane Slaughter), at The Queen Vic, giving her an address to pass on to Phil. Gavin follows Phil to a small hotel. He reaches Kathy first and takes her to a small airfield, with the intent of flying away from England. Phil and Ronnie intercept them and convince Kathy to come back to Walford with them. While Phil arranges a hotel for her to stay in, she hides in The Arches, where she comes face to face with Sharon, who is stunned to find she is alive. They have an angry confrontation that leads to a physical fight, before Phil moves Kathy to a nearby hotel. Within a week, Kathy is revealed to have Gavin hidden in her bathroom, with him controlling her again. After Ian's wife, Jane Beale (Laurie Brett), talks him out of suicide, Ian is shocked to see Kathy is alive and has witnessed the event. As Ian crosses the road to meet Kathy, he is hit by an oncoming car and rushed to hospital. Ian eventually regains consciousness and breaks down in happiness when he realises that Kathy is alive, but reveals he wants answers for her faking her death. As Ian is leaving hospital, Jane threatens Kathy to stay away from Walford in a bid to protect Ian. Ian demands to see Kathy and she explains to him that Gavin forced her to go on the run with him as part of an insurance scam and he had controlled her for years and she felt she had no choice. Ian persuades her to go to the police and she agrees, however, she lies about why she is there when she enters the station by claiming her handbag is stolen and later tells Ian that she told them everything and they are looking for Gavin. She then secretly meets Gavin who reminds her of their plan.

Kathy returns a few days later and meets with Ben, who is furious to see her again after several years of believing she was dead. He angrily declares that her absence is to blame for the current state of his life, declaring that he is the reason Phil has left due to his homosexuality, but Kathy tells him that she and Phil knew that he was gay before he even started school, and that they have always loved him. Ian later decides to rebuild his relationship with his mother and allows Kathy to move into his house. Gavin meets Kathy in Walford and reveals that he has kidnapped Phil and threatens to kill him if she does not follow his instructions and give him money. Kathy and Ben reluctantly agree to give into Gavin's demands, but after trying to steal Ian's safe, Kathy decides not to do so. Ian later tells Kathy that her grandson, Bobby Beale (Eliot Carrington) killed Lucy (now played by Hetti Bywater). Kathy, after seeing Ben drunk and angry at her, confesses to Ian that she is still on the run and she and Ben were planning to con him as Gavin has kidnapped Phil, so Ian throws her out, thinking she cares more about Phil than him. Jane is horrified that he told Kathy about Bobby, but Ian is confident she will not say anything to the police. Kathy then goes to the police station to report the kidnapping, while Ben tells Ian what Gavin has done. Ian contacts Gavin, telling him he knows what he has been doing. It soon turns out that he has been keeping Phil locked in his closet, but by the time Kathy and the police come to his house looking for him, he is not there although a fresh blood stain is found in the kitchen. Kathy later tells the Beales what she has done, and Sharon is incensed when she finds out the truth, insisting none of it would have happened if Kathy had not returned. Phil returns home severely injured and Ian allows Kathy to move back into his house. Gavin later holds Kathy, Ben and Phil hostage in their house and when Sharon confronts him, he reveals himself as her father before fleeing. Kathy is given a suspended sentence after pleading guilty to fraud.

When Bobby pushes Jane down the stairs during a scuffle, Jane lies to Kathy that she tripped, but Bobby tells Kathy the truth. Kathy confesses her fears to Jane that Bobby may have anger management problems, and after Bobby later smashes a plate in anger, Jane tells Kathy that she is right. Bobby's feud with Sharon's son, Dennis Rickman Jnr (Bleu Landau), escalates when Bobby kills Dennis' pet spider. Sharon tells Kathy he is evil and needs help, and Kathy then tells Sharon that Bobby pushed Jane down the stairs, so Sharon tells the Beales she will go to the police about Lucy's killing. Bobby finds out the truth from Dennis, who is later severely injured in a car crash. When the family discover that Phil has been rushed to hospital with a damaged liver, Sharon and Kathy join Phil's ex-partner, Shirley Carter (Linda Henry), in visiting him at to the hospital - only to learn upon arrival that Phil discharged himself. They later find Phil drunk at the pub, where he insults his family and inadvertently hits Kathy when she tries to help him leave.

Kathy is upset when Ian sends Bobby to a boarding school to try to help his anger problems. Ian puts the restaurant up for sale to pay for the school, and though Kathy tries to encourage more trade at the restaurant, Ian accepts an offer from a supermarket chain, Costmart. Several weeks later, Ian worries he will regret selling the restaurant but Kathy reminds him he is doing it for Bobby and must tell everyone soon that Costmart is buying it, or she will. The market traders then discover this from Ian, and Shirley's partner, Buster Briggs (Karl Howman), leads a campaign to boycott all of Ian's businesses, fearing they will all lose their jobs. Kathy tells Buster that Ian needs to fund Bobby's place in school, so Buster announces this at Ian's meeting with the traders, angering Ian. Buster asks Kathy why the school is so important, so she tells him to leave her alone as she does not care about him, but then kisses him. She then shows her loyalty to Ian by telling potential boycotters that Buster is a criminal. Ian then changes his mind about selling the restaurant. Buster later propositions Kathy for a secret relationship, believing he is with the wrong woman, and they begin meeting each other secretly. As she tries to meet up with Buster, Gavin stops her and says he has Dennis, so she gets into his car. Gavin takes her to a house and she realises that Dennis is not there. Gavin says they can live there together. Gavin's sister, Margaret Midhurst (Jan Harvey), arrives, and Gavin locks Kathy in a room to stop her from leaving, while he and Margaret argue; Margaret hits him over the head with a vase and the two women attempt to escape but most of the doors and windows are locked. Gavin regains consciousness and follows them, and it results in Margaret's death when she falls onto the windscreen of Sharon and Buster's car, who have arrived to rescue Kathy. Sharon calls the ambulance for Margaret whilst she and Buster search for Kathy. Buster finds Kathy, while Sharon confronts Gavin, who is arrested. Later, Kathy tells Buster she needs to end their relationship because things are getting too serious for her. However, as they passionately kiss one last time, they are unaware that Phil has seen them. Kathy spends a night away with Buster and on her return, she is distraught after being told that Ben has been killed and blames herself for not being with him, thus ending her affair with Buster. However, she is relieved when it is a mistaken identity and comforts Ben when he discovers it is his boyfriend, Paul Coker (Jonny Labey), who is dead. As Buster awaits the verdict from his son, Dean Wicks' (Matt Di Angelo), rape trial, Kathy reveals her two rapes to him during a heart-to-heart, they later embrace. Kathy resumes her affair with Buster but she is found out by Ian and Jane following a burglary at Ian's restaurant, however, although she denies her lover is Grant or Buster, she tells Jane she will end the affair. After Buster's son, Mick Carter (Danny Dyer), discovers the affair without knowing Kathy's identity, he urges Buster to tell Shirley or leave Walford for good. Buster asks Kathy to leave Walford with him, but she ultimately decides to remain in Walford with her family, leaving him heartbroken again and he leaves alone.

Kathy accompanies Paul's grandmother, Pam Coker (Lin Blakley), when she visits Diane Atmore (Hazel Ellerby), who is the mother of Simon Atmore (Tom Palmer), one of Paul's killers. Kathy and Pam try to persuade Diane to get Simon to plead guilty, which he eventually does. As a result, Simon and the rest of the killers are sentenced to thirty years in prison. Kathy is horrified when she hears about Ben wanting to donate some of his liver to Phil. She firmly tells him that she will not allow him to do so but Ben insists. Kathy accompanies Ben to his appointment to discuss the transplant. Kathy tries to support him but ends up embarrassing him when she mentions Paul's death and suggests that it is a reason for Ben wanting to donate. An angry Ben later tells Kathy to stay out of his life as she always has done. Kathy joins the Walford Players and clashes with the Christmas show's director, Geraldine Clough (Gwyneth Strong), over her plans initially to run a talent show, then to have a fairy godmother in her version of A Christmas Carol and finally for casting Kathy as a pantomime horse. Kathy's protests lead to Geraldine's resignation and Kathy becoming the director. Kathy is overjoyed when Ian decides to rename the café back to "Kathy's", which leads her to decide she no longer wants to be Kathy Sullivan, opting to change her name back to Kathy Beale by deed poll. Ben is hurt with Kathy's decision to change her surname to Beale (rather than his surname of Mitchell), feeling pushed out of the family, but she reassures him that it does not make him any less important to her than Ian. Shirley's aunt, Babe Smith (Annette Badland) starts selling breakfasts at The Vic and attempts to steal trade from the café by putting rat droppings in the café's coffee machine, leaving Kathy furious when she finds out. Kathy reports Babe for breaking The Vic's license by selling alcohol outside of their licensed hours. This leads to Babe, Mick and Shirley being arrested and fined, which Kathy feels guilty about. Kathy suffers minor injuries when a car, driven by Michelle (now played by Jenna Russell), crashes a car into the chip shop. After Phil returns from Italy, he tells Kathy about an offer he has received on the car lot land and confides in her about the guilt he still has over the car lot fire. Phil gives Ben The Arches and Kathy lets slip to Ben about the value of the car lot land, which Phil hands over to Jay Brown (Jamie Borthwick). Kathy insists to Phil that he justifies his reasons to Ben about the car lot land. Kathy returns from holiday and finds out from Kim Fox-Hubbard (Tameka Empson) about the gas explosion that left Jane severely injured and that Ian's adoptive son, Steven Beale (Aaron Sidwell), has died. Ian rejects Kathy's support. Ben tells Kathy that Ian may still have anger towards her for faking her death, despite accepting her. Kathy confides in Carmel Kazemi (Bonnie Langford) about her relationship with Ian and Carmel advises her to work at it. Kathy tells Ian and Ben that she feels that she has become irrelevant to them, but is determined to be their mother and apologises for not being there and Ian finally shows his emotions.

Later at Steven's memorial, once Kathy and Ian are walking away, a man leaves flowers for Kathy. The man is revealed to be Willmott-Brown, who has secretly returned to Walford as the CEO of his properly company called "Weyland & Co"; Willmott-Brown is plotting to conquer Walford and is aided by his daughter, Fi Browning (Lisa Faulkner); his son, Luke Browning (Adam Astill); his youngest son, Josh Hemmings (Eddie Eyre); and Willmott-Brown's brother-in-law, Hugo Browning (Simon Williams) respectively. Kathy is unbeknownst about Willmott-Brown's return until later on at Halloween, right after she comforts Michelle about her stalker, Tom Bailey (Daniel Casey) - as well as helping her give advice to Carmel's son, Shakil Kazemi (Shaheen Jafargholi), about his ex-girlfriend, Bex Fowler (Jasmine Armfield). When she closes the café for the night, Kathy is startled when Willmott-Brown appears and greets her - explaining that he has been diagnosed with terminal liver cancer. Grabbing hold of a knife while Willmott-Brown acts casual, Kathy rubbishes beliefs that they are alike - not does she believe Willmott-Brown when he claims that the reason for his visit is to move on from the past. Kathy wants Willmott-Brown to explain truthfully what happened on the night of the rape, but he continues to act in denial - prompting Kathy to furiously retell it. Whilst doing so, Kathy realises that Willmott-Brown has intended to rape her all along and demands to know when he decided to do so in the first place - pointing out that the impact had scarred her for life. Unfazed, Willmott-Brown gives Kathy his home address before leaving. Kathy later confides in Ian that Willmott-Brown is back, prompting him to inform Phil about this. When confronting Willmott-Brown with the threat of killing him should he go anywhere near Kathy again, Phil finds out that Ben's new boyfriend is Luke. Phil tells Kathy that Luke is Willmott-Brown's son and Phil fails to warn Luke away from Ben. Ben is angry with what Phil did and when Kathy tries to get Ben and Phil to make up, Kathy tells Ben that Phil was protecting him as Willmott-Brown raped her. After struggling to process what he is told, Ben is determined to hurt Willmott-Brown, but Kathy orders Ben to keep out of it as it happened to her and not him.

Ben confronts Luke with what he has been told and Luke tells Ben that Willmott-Brown wants to meet him. Ben takes a hammer when he meets Willmott-Brown and without Luke's presence, Ben threatens Willmott-Brown, but Willmott-Brown insists to Ben that he and Kathy were having an affair and she consented. As Ben about to attacks Willmott-Brown, Luke rush in and pulls Ben off Willmott-Brown, who tells Ben he knows he doesn't trust or believe Kathy. Kathy decides to leave Walford, especially when she finds out Ben met Willmott-Brown, but Kathy opts to remain and gives Ben's relationship with Luke her blessing. However before they get back together, Luke ends the relationship when Ben discovers Project Dagmar that Luke is secretly working on - which reveals that it will change Albert Square with a block of flats that is to replace The Queen Vic. Later on that night, Kathy is shocked when Carmel's boyfriend, Max Branning (Jake Wood), kisses Fi in front of Carmel and tells him that he should be ashamed of himself. Shortly after, Carmel leaves in tears, however, Kathy is shocked when Willmott-Brown arrives to serve the Carters with an eviction notice; Willmott-Brown casually greets Kathy with 'hello' and she leaves when he promises to see her later. Kathy later learns from Phil that Luke attacked Ben, and the trio later find out from Ian about Willmott-Brown's plan - further discovering that Max had in fact been conspiring with Willmott-Brown to exact revenge on Walford for being disbelieved over the fact that Bobby killed Lucy and how the impact had led him to be wrongfully imprisoned for Lucy's murder. Kathy is later angry with Ian when she finds out from Luke that Weyland owns the café. Kathy confronts Fi over what Willmott-Brown did to her and about all the women Willmott-Brown has destroyed, including her own mother. Kathy refuses to go into work and when she spills some hot food, Ian catches her making her hands sore through cleaning and Kathy breaks down to Ian, admitting she has not overcome what Willmott-Brown has done to her. Ian arranges to meet Willmott-Brown and tapes their conversation, where Willmott-Brown initially tells Ian that he and Kathy loved each other, but then admits to raping Kathy and deduces Ian's plan when he attempts to flee; Willmott-Brown has Ian restrained and deletes his recording, before threatening to further harm his family and tells him to send his best to Kathy. By the time, Fi has started to learn what her father is really like, she asks Kathy about the rape and her version causes Fi to be physically sick. Fi eventually confronts Willmott-Brown about Kathy's theory on the day after Christmas Eve, prompting him to disown his daughter. After safeguarding his documents that could expose Weyland & Co's illegitimate activities, which he showed Fi earlier on before disowning her, Willmott-Brown visits Kathy in the café once more. They gradually talk about the past and Kathy soon learns that Willmott-Brown's intent of conquering the square was all a ruse, and that his real plan is to use this opportunity to win her over by granting her control of his company - thus controlling the square in general. When Willmott-Brown proposes they leave Walford to start anew, Kathy appears interested until she then points out that he is seeking to buy her silence as well. Willmott-Brown denies this, but Kathy - undeterred by his manipulation tactics - stands up for herself and grabs Willmott-Brown by the genitals, making it clear that her family and friends in Walford are all that matter to her. Upon threatening to cut Willmott-Brown's gentles of and serve it to him in a sandwich, further making it clear that she will never submit to him in any circumstance, Kathy tells Willmott-Brown that he is going to hell no matter how hard he tries to make amends for raping her or terrorizing the square. Willmott-Brown leaves defeated and is later taken into custody when Fi, realizing that Kathy was telling the truth about her father, extracts the documents and delivers them to the police. Fi later departs Walford after disowning her father and undoing his control of the square, as well as making amends with Kathy by giving her back the café. Kathy later opens up Walford’s first gay bar.

In 2021, Kathy forms a relationship with Tom "Rocky" Cotton (Brian Conley) and they eventually become engaged. They get married in June 2023, but their relationship is threatened by Rocky's bigamy, having not divorced his wife, Jo Cotton (Vicki Michelle); they pay her £50,000 to ensure she doesn't go to the police. When Ian returns to Walford with thought to be dead Cindy, Kathy and Rocky move into flats owned by Nish Panesar (Navin Chowdhry). Rocky eventually falls into Nish's debt and sets fire to Kathy's café to cash an insurance claim; the café explodes and severely injures Ian's son, Peter Beale (Thomas Law) and Bobby (now played by Clay Milner Russell). Nish eventually discovers Rocky's culpability in the explosion and blackmails the couple into selling him the café; Kathy then ends her relationship with Rocky.

On Christmas Day 2023, Kathy is one of five women who witness the murder of Keanu Taylor (Danny Walters), who was stabbed by Linda Carter (Kellie Bright) to save Sharon whom Keanu is strangling at the time. She is then forced to betray Rocky to the police for his previous arson of her café for insurance purposes caused by debt, as it is obvious he saw Keanu's body being moved to the café. Rocky is imprisoned for ten years; later, Ben is arrested for credit card fraud in the USA and extradited. When Keanu's body is discovered, Kathy, Stacey Slater (Lacey Turner) and Suki Panesar (Balvinder Sopal) attempt to use their possession of the weapon against the others; they eventually frame Dean for the crime. When Dean's trial collapses, Kathy vocally opposes continuing to implicate him in Keanu's murder; she later apologises to Keanu's sister, Bernadette Taylor (Clair Norris), when Linda confesses to her.

Throughout late 2024, Kathy becomes closer to Rocky's friend, Harvey Monroe (Ross Boatman), despite his relationship with Jean Slater (Gillian Wright). When Nish becomes suspicious of the events surrounding Keanu's murder, he tricks Kathy into accidentally revealing the truth. She becomes guilty when Nish uses this to blackmail Suki into religiously marrying him in exchange for him taking the credit for the murder, but hopes that this will lead to the end of their troubles; Kathy later witnesses Nish being arrested for the murder on Halloween 2024.

In December 2024, Kathy takes Ian to the hospital when he suffers an angina attack; she pleads with Ian to inform Cindy of what happened, but to no avail. When Cindy is attacked on Christmas Day, shortly after her affair with Junior Knight (Micah Balfour) is exposed, Kathy and Cindy's ex-husband and Junior's father, George Knight (Colin Salmon), are the first to discover her and accompany her to the hospital, where Kathy becomes a suspect in Cindy's attempted murder owing to her lack of an alibi and previous feud with Cindy; however, she evades initial suspicion when Harvey provides her with a false alibi; this arouses Jean's son-in-law Martin Fowler's (James Bye) suspicions, resulting in him discovering their kiss but he agrees to remain silent for Jean's sake in exchange for Kathy staying away from Harvey. Kathy supports Peter's girlfriend Lauren Branning (Jacqueline Jossa) when she is arrested for Cindy's attack and is dismayed when Ian allows her to move back in to Number 45; she supports Ian when he evicts Cindy after she tries to get Kathy drunk so that she would confess to the attack.

During the wedding of Billy (Perry Fenwick) and Honey Mitchell (Emma Barton), Cindy steals Phil's gun, planning on finding her locket which was stolen during the attack, believing that Ian has it- thus implicating him in the attack. Cindy eventually catches Ian with the locket and prepares to shoot him just as Kathy arrives and confesses that she attacked Cindy, wanting revenge for her mistreatment of Ian across the years; an ensuing fight results in Cindy shooting Ian in the arm before fleeing, vowing to report Kathy to the police. Ian confronts Cindy and offers to bribe her to keep quiet about the truth; in revenge, Cindy pushes Ian in front of a car being driven by Reiss Colwell (Jonny Freeman), forcing Reiss to swerve out of the way and crash into the Queen Vic, setting his car on fire. Kathy follows Cindy into the Vic as she attempts to flee just as the flames reach some gas bottles and cause an explosion which destroys the building, severely injuring the two women. Kathy considers leaving Cindy to die in the pub but eventually helps her escape the building and seek medical attention; Cindy then agrees not to report Kathy and leave Walford in exchange for her role in the explosion being kept secret, leaving Kathy to mourn Martin's death in the explosion. Kathy starts an affair with Harvey and later enters a relationship with him. After giving away The Prince Albert to Cindy due to her blackmailing Kathy over the affair, Cindy exposes it publicly in The Vic.

== Other appearances ==
During the Children in Need charity appeal of 1993, the BBC produced a special two-part edition of the popular science-fiction television programme Doctor Who, entitled Dimensions in Time. Part of the special was shot on the EastEnders set of Albert Square in Elstree. A scene from the programme, which was set in the future, showed a grey-haired Kathy Beale selling fruit and veg from Mark Fowler's (Todd Carty) stall with produce all priced with barcodes. Kathy, along with an elderly version of Pauline Fowler (Wendy Richard), featured in promotional pictures with the Third Doctor, played by Jon Pertwee, and the Children in Need mascot, Pudsey Bear.

== Reception ==
Kathy became one of the longest running characters on the show and Taylforth was the first cast member to appear in a total of 1,000 episodes. In the book Cultural Theory and Popular Culture, Christine Geraghty has likened Kathy to the characters Deirdre Barlow (Anne Kirkbride) from Coronation Street, Pam Ewing (Victoria Principal) from Dallas and Krystle Carrington (Linda Evans) from Dynasty as they are associated "not merely with moral values but also the capacity to speak out when necessary in defence of the truth."

In a "character decoding" study performed in the 1980s, 93 viewers (64 women and 29 men) were surveyed (27 were undergraduate students, 33 were from the Oxford subject panel, and 33 were soap viewers who responded to advertisements in a soap magazine) on 25 characters from EastEnders to discover viewers' judgements and representations of the characters, through the construction of three-dimensional, multi-dimensional scaling space. The study found that the character of Kathy Beale was labelled in the "morality/potency" category - a moral character, family-oriented, warm, likable and steady.

In the book Come on Down?: Popular Media Culture in Post-war Britain, Kathryn and Phillip Dodd have used Kathy as an example of an independent, "glamorous working-class woman". They suggest that the forging of strong, female working-class characters in soap operas is "a counterweight to the more usual celebration of masculine physicality and identification of the working class with that masculinity."

Writer and actress Jacquetta May, who played Rachel Kominski in EastEnders in the early 1990s, has commented on Kathy and questioned whether the events that happened in her fictional life reflected "any sort of true experience". In an article she comments, "Surely no woman's life could contain such a catalogue of disasters: slum childhood, two rapes, a drug-taking daughter, product of the first rape who tops herself, a broken marriage, disastrous affairs and now an alcoholic husband who endangered their son's life." She states that Kathy's biography is a "contrast between a realistic portrayal" of a woman and familiar stereotypes — Kathy "the good, long-suffering woman and victim".

In a study by the Stirling Media Research Institute about violence in the media, Phil Mitchell (Steve McFadden) and Kathy's abusive relationship was analysed. The explanation for Phil's alcoholism, his wife abuse, and the problems he has in relating to his son, was largely accepted as plausible. Women found the depiction of family life and domestic violence realistic and believable and felt that soap operas such as EastEnders should deal with important social issues. They judged soap operas as suitable locations for educating the public about social issues such as domestic violence. Phil's attendance at an AA and subsequent reconciliation with Kathy was viewed, leading some male participants to question the plausibility of the speedy reunion, "One session could hardly make Phil capable of going home and opening up his feelings to [Kathy]." Several focus groups attributed the need for "such a quick dramatic fix" as indicative of the ratings war with rival soap, Coronation Street. Phil's reconciliation with Kathy was also seen as "implausible", though at the same time "it was clearly accepted that according to the conventions of soap opera, there are no permanent solutions." The study reported that much group discussion centred on the Alcoholics Anonymous group scene, which was, for the most part, seen as an accurate depiction of an AA group therapy session. In addition, Phil's portrayal of a suffering alcoholic was also seen as realistic and a "typical portrayal of bottled-up masculinity". Comparatively, male participants were generally dismissive towards Kathy: "She attracted little sympathy or understanding. Her tendency to take some responsibility for her own plight was not countered. Her tale of being abused by men and her history of rapes were at best mentioned in passing, at worst treated disparagingly. There was a quite widely shared sense of how men and women are characterised as radically different in EastEnders and other soap operas..." A scene in which Kathy and her close friend Pat Butcher (Pam St Clement) show their competence as electricians, a scene that allowed the characters to "re-examine past mistakes and agree that life is hell, but you've got to keep struggling, mend the electrics ('wait for a man to do a job and you'll wait forever') and have a laugh" was felt, especially in middle-class male groups, "to be a superficial kind of feminism in line with how soap operas underscore gender differences." Gay men offered a major exception to this general indifference to Kathy's points of view; they readily espoused them.

During a period of ratings decline and heavy media criticism aimed at EastEnders in 2005, Rupert Smith, The Guardian TV critic and author of EastEnders: 20 Years in Albert Square, stated that Kathy was one of EastEnders' best characters, the type the show was lacking at the time. He described her, along with characters Angie Watts (Anita Dobson), Tiffany Mitchell (Martine McCutcheon), Bianca Jackson (Patsy Palmer), Janine Butcher (Charlie Brooks) and Cindy Beale (Michelle Collins) as "strong women who can't control their appetites".

In 2008, All About Soap included the storyline that sees James Willmott-Brown (William Boyde) rape Kathy in their list of "top ten taboo" storylines of all time. Their writer described it as one of the "taboos which have bravely been broken by soaps." The rape storyline has also been described as "high-profile" and "harrowing", by Duncan Lindsay from the Metro newspaper.

On the character's thought-to-be death in 2015, Lindsay (Metro) said that fans "have been very vocal about the poor decision in killing such a Walford icon off". He also called Kathy's return "sensational". One viewer was shocked by the return and, after the airing, wrote on Twitter, "Kathy's back!!!! OMG!!!! I can't cope with much more". Another exclaimed that "Dreams do come true". The episode that sees the character return was originally watched by 10.84 million viewers with a peak of 11.9 million viewers. It was also revealed that there were 30,000 tweets written on Twitter about the episode. Edward Brooks and Rebecca Pocklington from The Daily Mirror called Kathy's return a "shock". Kathy's 2015 reintroduction was nominated for 'Best Shock Twist' at that year's Inside Soap Awards, under the name of 'Kathy Beale is alive'. Seen as Kathy returned, despite being thought to be dead, several news sources joked about the chance of Wellard (Kyte) returning with his former owner, Robbie Jackson (Dean Gaffney). Adam Miller from Daily Express described Kathy's return as "spectacular". Daniel Kilkelly from Digital Spy called Kathy a "Walford icon". She was also been described as a "legend". In 2023, Speaking on her return, Alex Ross from Planet Radio wrote that "EastEnders fans were left shocked to the core in 2015 when she made a return to the soap as Kathy Beale! That's the world of soaps for you!" On 6 November 2017, Taylforth was awarded the "Outstanding Achievement" accolade at the Inside Soap Awards, for both her roles in soap, Kathy and Hollyoaks' Sandy Roscoe.

In 2015, Lindsay (Metro) claimed that he noticed "a definite spark" on-screen between Kathy and Phil, and theorised that they would reunite as a couple. He brought up Phil's marriage to Sharon and said that this could create 'payback' for Sharongate, a storyline that featured Phil cheat on Kathy with Sharon.

In May 2021, Tom Haynes, a reporter from MyLondon, described Kathy as one of the soap's "key players." On their all-time EastEnders character ranking, HuffPost ranked Kathy as 26th and wrote about her, "Nobody brings glamour to the greasy spoon like Kathy. This husky-voiced diva has been known to serve up life lessons with the fry-ups, but her wisdom has been hard earned as she's endured unspeakable tragedy."
