= Alex Healy (EastEnders) =

Fictional character from the BBC soap opera EastEnders

- EastEnders character
- Portrayed by: Richard Driscoll
- Duration: 1997–1999
- First appearance: Episode 1429; 31 March 1997
- Last appearance: Episode 1823; 23 August 1999
In-universe information
- Occupation: Vicar
- Father: Jeff Healy
- Mother: Jane Healy
- Sisters: Mel Owen; Katie Healy
- Nephews: Hunter Owen

The Reverend Alex Healy is a fictional character from the BBC soap opera EastEnders, played by Richard Driscoll between 31 March 1997 and 23 August 1999.

== Creation and development ==
His first major television role, Driscoll was sent to audition for EastEnders by his agent and following a screen, test was given the part of vicar Alex. His first scene was with actress Daniela Denby-Ashe who played Sarah Hills. He has reflected, "I was really chuffed. But that soon turned to fear when I had my first scene with Daniela. It was so nerve-racking. I didn't really understand the set-up. I don't know how I got the words out."

Alex's most notable storyline is a love affair with Kathy Mitchell (Gillian Taylforth) who is married in the serial to Phil Mitchell (Steve McFadden). Discussing the storyline, Driscoll suggested that Alex had been "wracked by emotional and spiritual turmoil ever since" sleeping with Kathy. He added, "Alex has got a lot of conflict. He's been suggesting to his father that he should work at his relationship with his wife – but there he is having an affair with a married woman. He feels a bit of a hypocrite – he feels guilty and ashamed. But the inescapable fact is he's attracted to Kathy. Something strange and wonderful happens to him when he's around her."

Driscoll quit the role in 1999, claiming that it had always been his intention to stay for only a few years: "I felt it was the right time to go. I'd learnt a hell of a lot. The pace and the turnover is incredible. It has been brilliant but I'm an actor and I want to do different things [...] When I finished, the whole cast gathered to clap me off the set. I felt it was an ending and it was sad. It was emotional because it was my first major role and there were things to prove. But it's time to move on."

== Storylines ==
Alex arrives in Walford in March 1997 as the local vicar. He runs a homeless shelter called Bridge House with the help of Christian follower Sarah Hills (Daniela Denby-Ashe), despite protests from many of the residents in Walford. Alex falls in love with Kathy Mitchell (Gillian Taylforth) while her marriage to Phil Mitchell (Steve McFadden) has begun to crumble. Alex and Kathy break up when she leaves for South Africa, ignoring Alex's pleas to stay. A while later, Alex leaves the Square to work in a mission in Somalia.

== Reception ==
A popular character with female viewers, Driscoll claims that he received "loads of fan-mail from women and would get stopped in the street by people who told him: 'If you were my vicar, I would go to church."

The character came under criticism in 1998 following his affair with Kathy Mitchell. One vicar complained that the BBC were portraying Christian characters as "jokes or frauds". Gillian Taylforth, who played Kathy, reportedly had reservations about the plot too as she feared Kathy sleeping with a vicar would cause a negative response from viewers.

== See also ==
- List of fictional clergy and religious figures
