= Gary Powell (actor) =

British actor

- Occupation: Actor
- Years active: 1988–present
- Notable work: The Bill; EastEnders

Gary Powell is a British actor. He is possibly best known for playing the character Laurie Bates in the BBC soap opera EastEnders.

== Career ==
Laurie made his first screen appearance in September 1989 as a love interest for Kathy Beale (Gillian Taylforth), but the character was one of many to be written out of the serial early in 1990, following the introduction of executive producer, Michael Ferguson.

Powell's other television work has included roles in: Between The Lines (1992); Inspector Morse (1987; 1995); Thief Takers (1996); Kavanagh QC (1997); Beech is Back (2001); A Touch Of Frost (2003); Judge John Deed (2005); Holby City (2005); The Golden Hour (2005); Tom Brown's Schooldays (2005); Five Days (2006) and Doctor Who episode "42", playing Dev Ashton (2007). He made several other appearances in The Bill in 2005, 2006 and made a larger appearance as Darren Cuttler in The Bill's series Gun Runner.

Film credits have included: Crush (2001); From Hell (2001), Hollywoodland (2006) and Silent Hours (2015).

== Filmography ==
=== Film ===
Year	Title	Role	Notes
1994	The Favor	Fishermen	
1996	Michael Collins	Black and Tan on Lorry	
1999	The World Is Not Enough	Submarine Crewman	

=== Television ===
Year	Title	Role	Notes
1987–1995	Inspector Morse	Steven Parnell/Constable	
1988	Blind Justice	P.C. Mines	
1989	Rules of Engagement	Guard Corporal	
1989	EastEnders	Laurie Bates	
1990–1993	The Bill	Brian Butler	
1991	Minder	Roger	
1992	Between the lines	Youth 1	
1995	She‘s out	Barman	
1996	Thief takers	Tommy Raymond	
1996	Sharman	JJ	
1997	Kavanagh GC	George Foster	
1999	Wonderful You	Drunk Man	
2000	Lock, stock…	Rainham Ray	
2001	Beech is back	Steve Keating	
2002	Helen West	Sgt Morgan	
2003	A touch of frost	Starkey	
2007	Doctor Who	Dev Ashton	
2016	The Hollow Crown	Tyrell	
