= Louise Plowright =

English actress (1956–2016)

- Plowright as Julie Cooper in EastEnders
- Born: 1 June 1956; Congleton, Cheshire, England
- Died: 1 March 2016 (aged 59); Duderstadt, Germany
- Occupation: Actress
- Television: EastEnders (1989–1990)
- Spouse: Istvan Nemeth

Louise Plowright (1 June 1956 – 1 March 2016) was an English actress.

== Biography ==
Plowright trained at the Bristol Old Vic Theatre School. She first came to prominence playing abrasive hairdresser Julie Cooper in the television soap opera EastEnders from 1989 to 1990. Subsequent major roles on TV include Linda Harvey in Families and Michelle Thorn in Footballers' Wives: Extra Time.

The Cheshire-born singer-actress appeared in a number of regional and touring productions of musicals, where her roles included: April in Hot Shoe Shuffle, Julie Johnston in Bad Girls: The Musical and Phyllis Rogers Stone in Follies, and most recently Chitty Chitty Bang Bang amongst other numerous West End concert performances including Living on an Island at The Talk of London. She appeared in various regional theatre pantomimes. In the summer of 2009 she appeared in Oklahoma! at the Chichester Festival Theatre as Aunt Eller, and the following autumn in Manchester in White Christmas. In 2010 she returned to the Chichester Festival Theatre to star in the revival of 42nd Street.

Plowright made her West End theatre debut in 1999, originating the role of Tanya in the hit musical Mamma Mia!. The following year, she was promoted to the leading role of Donna, which she played for four years. On 29 October 2012, she replaced Julie Legrand as Madame Morrible in the musical Wicked in the West End. Due to ill health, Plowright withdrew from the production, and was replaced by Harriet Thorpe on 22 April 2013.

== Death ==
Plowright died in Duderstadt, Germany, of pancreatic cancer, on 1 March 2016, aged 59. She had raised funds for experimental treatment in Seoul, South Korea, which proved unsuccessful.
