= Steve McFadden =

English actor (born 1959)

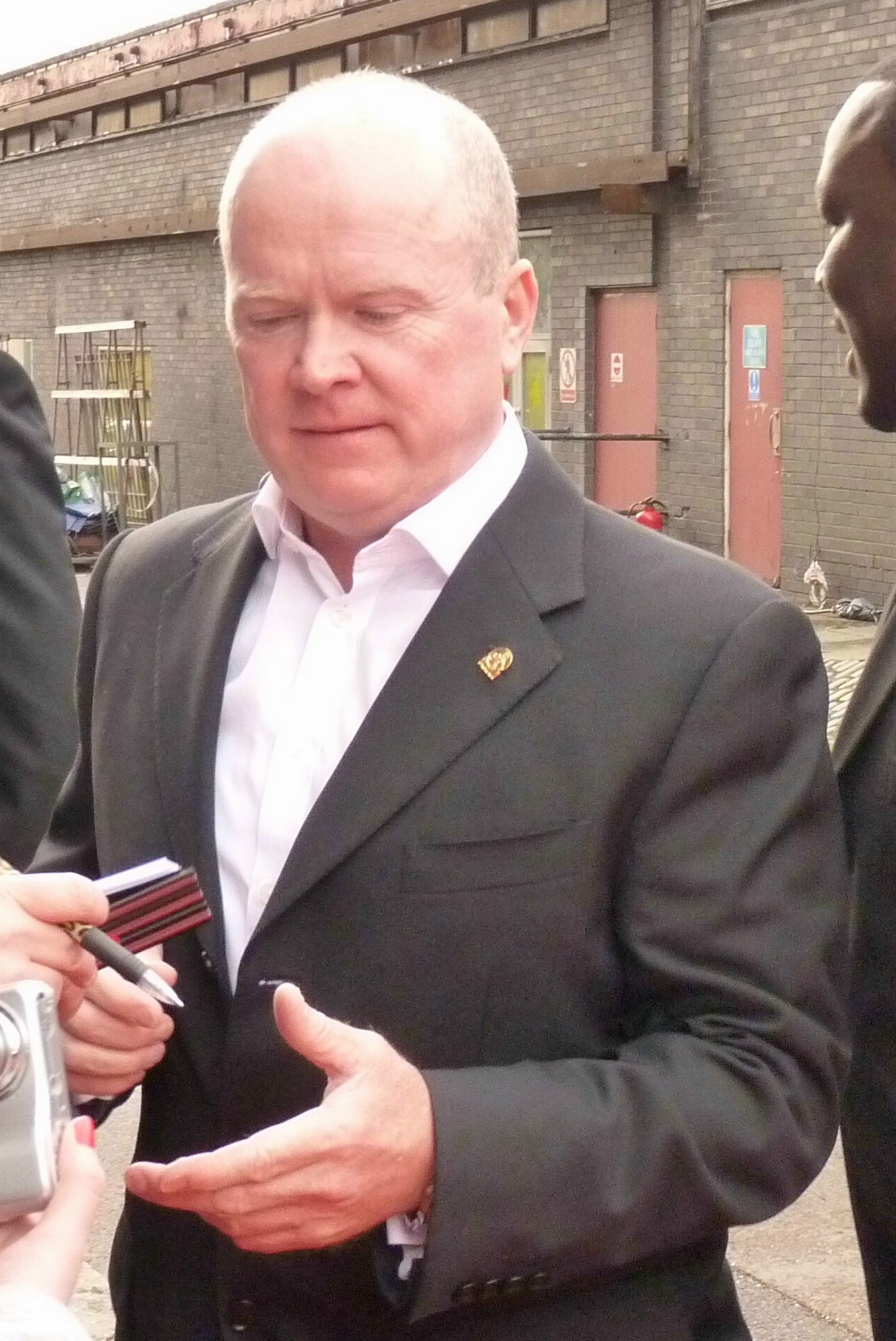
- McFadden in 2011
- Born: Steve Robert Reid; 20 March 1959 (age 67); Maida Vale, London, England
- Occupation: Actor
- Years active: 1988–present
- Known for: Role of Phil Mitchell in EastEnders
- Children: 5

Steve Robert McFadden (né Reid; born 20 March 1959) is an English actor. He is best known for his role as Phil Mitchell in the BBC One soap opera EastEnders, which he has played since 1990. He has received accolades including the British Soap Award for Outstanding Achievement. McFadden was also the presenter of the game show Britain's Hardest (2004).

== Early life ==
Steve McFadden was born in Maida Vale, London, on 20 March 1959. He left school in 1975, and had short stints in jobs including labouring, carrot picking, plumbing and working at a builder's merchant. After attending university, McFadden decided that he wanted to become an actor, and was accepted into the Royal Academy of Dramatic Art in 1984, graduating in 1987.

== Career ==
In 1988, McFadden got his first acting role as an uncredited extra in the film Buster. He played his first speaking role as a football hooligan in the 1989 BBC television film The Firm, and this was followed by guest appearances in television series including The Bill, Minder, and Bergerac.

McFadden then began portraying the role of Phil Mitchell in the BBC soap opera EastEnders, at the beginning of 1990, at the same time as Ross Kemp, who played Phil's younger brother Grant Mitchell.

McFadden then made a brief appearance in the film Kevin & Perry Go Large (2000), and starred in an episode of the BBC anthology series Murder in Mind in 2001.. He took a one year hiatus from EastEnders in 2004.

He presented the reality television series Britain's Hardest, which was an underground competition broadcast on Sky One in 2004. In 2005, he filmed a small part as a detective sergeant in the film Provoked which released in 2006.

He returned to EastEnders for two episodes in April 2005, and in October 2005, he returned on a permanent basis, after his character was cleared of armed robbery.

He has also appeared as Captain Hook in a pantomime production of Peter Pan from 2010 to 2011 at the Wycombe Swan.

== Personal life ==
McFadden has five children. His son Matt McFadden's mother is Sue Marshall, and Angela Bostock is the mother of his daughters Teona and Mollie Jane. Rachel Sidwell gave birth to his daughter Amelie Tinkerbell on 29 June 2009; the couple's relationship ended two months later. A fifth child, a daughter named Frankie, was born to his girlfriend Karen Cairns in June 2016.

In 1996, McFadden was banned from driving for 18 months and fined £1000 plus £350 in costs after pleading guilty to drink-driving after attending a party at a London nightclub.

McFadden is a sailor, and took part in the Thames Diamond Jubilee Pageant in his motorboat, Barbara. In 2014, he sued the Metropolitan Police and News of the World after a police officer sold details about him to the newspaper. He sued the News of the World after one of their journalists admitted trying to intercept his voicemail messages in the News International phone hacking scandal. News Group Newspapers and the Metropolitan police agreed to pay McFadden substantial damages and his legal costs..

== Filmography ==
=== Film ===
Year	Title	Role
1988	Buster	Gang Member
1990	Happy Birthday, Coronation Street!	Himself
1998	EastEnders: The Mitchells – Naked Truths	Phil Mitchell
2000	Kevin & Perry Go Large	Bouncer 2
2001	Brit Awards 2001	Phil Mitchell
2001	Comic Relief: Say Pants to Poverty	Phil Mitchell
2003	EastEnders: Slaters in Detention	Phil Mitchell
2003	Comic Relief 2003: The Big Hair Do	Phil Mitchell
2005	2005 TV Moments	Himself
2006	Provoked	DS Ron Meyers
2007	The Big Fat Quiz of the Year	Himself
2007	The 2nd TVNow Awards	Himself
2007	EastEnders Feuds: The Beales vs. The Mitchells	Phil Mitchell
2008	The British Soap Awards 2008: The Party	Himself
2010	EastEnders Live: The Aftermath	Himself
2010	EastEnders: Last Tango in Walford	Phil Mitchell
2011	The National Television Awards: Party 2011	Himself
2011	EastEnders: Greatest Exits	Himself
2012	Farewell Pat	Phil Mitchell
2012	EastEnders: Phil on Remand	Phil Mitchell
2016	Bobby Beale: The Story So Far	Phil Mitchell
2016	EastEnders: Last Orders	Himself
2016	EastEnders – The Last Goodbye	Phil Mitchell
2018	The Best of EastEnders	Phil Mitchell
2021	Kurupting the Industry: The People Just Do Nothing Story	Himself

=== Television ===
Year	Title	Role	Notes
1989	Minder	Mickey	Episode: "It's a Sorry Lorry Morrie"
1989	Screen Two	Billy	Episode: The Firm
1989	The Bill	Gun Dealer 2	Episode: "Bad Company"
1989	Vote for Them	Staff Sgt. Ballantine	3 episodes
1989	Hard Cases	Workman	Episode: "Series 2, episode 5"
1989	Saracen	Nash	Episode: "Crossfire"
1990	Bergerac	Jones	Episode: "Roots of Evil"
1990–2003, 2005–present	EastEnders	Phil Mitchell	Regular role
1993	Doctor Who: Dimensions in Time	Phil Mitchell	2 episodes
1994, 1997, 1999	This Is Your Life	Himself	3 episodes
1996, 2005, 2007, 2010–2011	National Television Awards	Himself	5 episodes
1998	Best of British	Himself	Episode: "Barbara Windsor"
1998	TFI Friday	Himself	Episode: "Series 4, episode 13"
1999, 2006–2009, 2017, 2022	The British Soap Awards	Himself	7 episodes
2001	Auntie's Bloomers	Phil Mitchell	Episode: "New Bursting Bloomers"
2001	Murder in Mind	Joe Waterman	Episode: "Flame"
2002, 2007–2009, 2012	EastEnders Revealed	Himself	6 episodes
2005	Comic Relief Does Fame Academy	Himself	Episode: "Series 2, episode 6"
2006	Sex, Lies & Soaps	Phil Mitchell	Episode: "Bad Behaviour"
2006, 2016	Screenwipe	Phil Mitchell	2 episodes
2006, 2009, 2018	This Morning	Himself	3 episodes
2007	Would I Lie to You?	Phil Mitchell	Episode: "Series 1, episode 2"
2009	Loose Women	Himself	Episode: "Series 14, episode 6"
2009–2010	EastEnders Revealed	Phil Mitchell	Episode: "The Sins of Archie Mitchell"
2010	Rude Tube	Phil Mitchell	Episode: "Rude Tunes"
2010	EastEnders: The Greatest Cliffhangers	Himself	Episode: "Series 1, episode 2"
2010	EastEnders: The Greatest Cliffhangers	Phil Mitchell	Episode: "Series 1, episode 2"
2010	Piers Morgan's Life Stories	Himself	Episode: "Barbara Windsor"
2010	Piers Morgan's Life Stories	Phil Mitchell	Episode: "Barbara Windsor"
2016	Lorraine	Himself	Episode: "4 October 2016"
2016	The One Show	Phil Mitchell	Episode: "Peggy Mitchell Special"
2018	South at Six	Phil Mitchell	Episode: "23 November 2018"
2020	EastEnders: Secrets from the Square	Phil Mitchell	5 episodes
2020	The Noughties	Himself	Episode: "2001"
2020–2021	What We Were Watching	Phil Mitchell	2 episodes

== Awards and nominations ==
Year	Award	Category	Result	Ref.
2001	National Television Awards	Most Popular Actor	Nominated	
2001	The British Soap Awards	Villain of the Year	Won	
2001	Inside Soap Awards	Best Actor	Nominated	
2001	Inside Soap Awards	Best Bad Boy	Nominated	
2002	National Television Awards	Most Popular Actor	Nominated	
2002	British Soap Awards	Best Actor	Nominated	
2002	British Soap Awards	Villain of the Year	Nominated	
2003	British Soap Awards	Best Actor	Nominated	
2003	British Soap Awards	Villain of the Year	Nominated	
2003	Inside Soap Awards	Best Actor	Won	
2006	British Soap Awards	Best Actor	Nominated	
2006	British Soap Awards	Villain of the Year	Nominated	
2006	Inside Soap Awards	Best Actor	Nominated	
2007	TV Choice Awards	Best Soap Actor	Nominated	
2007	TV Now Awards	Male Soap Star	Won	
2009	British Soap Awards	Best Actor	Nominated	
2010	TV Now Awards	Favourite Male Soap Star	Nominated	
2016	British Soap Awards	Outstanding Achievement Award	Won	
2016	British Soap Awards	Best Male Dramatic Performance	Nominated	
2016	Inside Soap Awards	Best Soap Actor	Won	
2017	British Soap Awards	Best Male Dramatic Performance	Nominated	
2025	National Film Awards UK	Best Actor in a TV Series	Nominated	
2025	British Soap Awards	Best Dramatic Performance	Won	
2025	TRIC Awards	Soap Actor	Won	
2025	National Television Awards	Serial Drama Performance	Won	
2025	Inside Soap Awards	Best Actor	Won	
2025	TVTimes Awards	Favourite Soap Actor	Nominated	
2026	TV Choice Awards	Best Soap Performance	Nominated	
