= List of EastEnders characters introduced in 1993 =

EastEnders logo

The following is a list of characters that first appeared in the BBC soap opera EastEnders in 1993, by order of first appearance. 1994 was a historic year for EastEnders, as in April, a third weekly episode was introduced. Due to the programme's increased frequency, a number of new characters were introduced to the regular cast in the latter part of 1993 and early 1994. Among them were the Jackson family: mother Carol (Lindsey Coulson), her four children, Bianca (Patsy Palmer), Robbie (Dean Gaffney), Sonia (Natalie Cassidy), and Billie (Devon Anderson), as well as Carol's partner Alan Jackson (Howard Antony). Though Carol and Alan were not initially married in the serial, and though Alan was only the biological father of Billie, the whole family took on Alan's surname. The family was created by writer Tony McHale. None of the actors cast as the Jackson family were matched for appearance or screen compatibility. Cassidy has commented, "it was all decided without doing that. I don't think it particularly mattered that none of us Jackson kids looked like each other because all our characters had different dads!" Carol was Coulson's first major television role. Various members of the family began to appear sporadically from November 1993 onwards, but in episodes that aired early in 1994, the Jacksons moved from Walford Towers, a block of flats, to the soap's focal setting of Albert Square. Their slow introduction was a deliberate attempt by the programme makers to introduce the whole family over a long period. The Jacksons have been described by EastEnders scriptwriter Colin Brake as a "classic problem family".

== Danny Taurus ==
Danny Taurus
- EastEnders character
- Portrayed by: Billy Boyle
- First appearance: Episode 827; 5 January 1993
- Last appearance: Episode 869; 1 June 1993
In-universe information
- Occupation: Singer

Danny Taurus (real name Danny Travis), played by Billy Boyle, first appears on 5 January 1993 and leaves on 1 June 1993. Danny, an East End rock and roll singer, uses the stage name Danny Taurus, and was nearly famous locally when Pete (Peter Dean) and Pauline Beale (Wendy Richard) were teenagers. In 1993, Danny visits Pete and invites him to a gig. He is more than a pub singer, who dreams of making a comeback. Danny is pleased to meet Pauline again, as he always fancied her when they were at school. Pauline is flattered by the attention and she and Danny go on a few platonic dates—Pauline's motive being to see if Arthur might respond to a bit of competition—but Danny takes it seriously and asks Pauline to go away with him. Pauline is tempted, but she eventually turns Danny down and he goes off in search of his big break.

== Rose Chapman ==
Rose Chapman
- EastEnders character
- Portrayed by: Petra Markham
- First appearance: Episode 828; 7 January 1993
- Last appearance: Episode 864; 13 May 1993
In-universe information
- Husband: Alfie Chapman

Rose Chapman, played by Petra Markham, is an old friend of Pauline Fowler (Wendy Richard) from school. Pete Beale (Peter Dean) and Rose get on well, particularly when Rose reveals that she once had a crush on him while they were at school together. Over the weeks a romance develops. Despite professing to be very happy with Pete, Rose frequently lets him down, standing him up on dates and disappearing for days without word. Eventually Pete confronts her and she reveals that not only is she married, but she was married to a local gangster named Alfie Chapman, who had a reputation for extreme violence. Although Alfie is in prison, his family are not and they make it clear that they do not approve of Rose seeing Pete. Pete mulls over what to do but eventually decides to brave the Chapmans and remain with Rose.

Alfie's sister Annie warns Rose to finish with Pete, or face severe repercussions from his two brothers. Rose remains defiant and goes to visit Alfie in prison, demanding a divorce. This is curtailed when she discovers that Alfie is suffering from terminal cancer and after a period of contemplation she decides to stop seeing Pete so that she can nurse Alfie through his remaining months. However, Rose cannot keep away from Pete and in May she re-enters his life, telling him that she misses him. When Alfie's brothers discover she was seeing Pete again, they beat her badly, causing her to be hospitalised. Pete goes to visit Rose in hospital and they make plans to go into hiding to escape the wrath of the Chapmans. The following day, Pete smuggles Rose out of hospital with Frank Butcher's (Mike Reid) help and they then make their getaway to start a new life.

In December, news of Alfie Chapman's death reaches Walford. Pauline places an advert in a newspaper, pleading for Pete and Rose to return. They reply, and the residents of Walford plan a party to celebrate their homecoming. However, on the day they are due back, Pauline is contacted by the police with the news that Pete and Rose have been killed by a car accident arranged by the Chapman family.

== Aidan Brosnan ==
Aidan Brosnan, played by Sean Maguire, appears between January and December 1993. A popular character, Aidan is involved in storylines about homelessness, drug-abuse and suicide. His relationship with the character Mandy Salter (Nicola Stapleton) is a dominant storyline in the serial throughout 1993. The character of Aidan was introduced on-screen in January 1993 by executive producer, Leonard Lewis. The role was cast to actor Sean Maguire. Having been a familiar face on children's television for many years, Maguire was previously most famous for playing Tegs in BBC's school drama, Grange Hill. At his audition, Maguire had to show off his football skills and talk in a convincing Irish accent. Although the character's duration was relatively short – he appeared in only 63 episodes of the soap – Aidan became "a very popular" character, particularly with the young audience. EastEnders scriptwriter Colin Brake has suggested that by the end of his stint in the soap, Sean Maguire's status as a teen pin-up "put him in the Take That league". Sean Maguire's departure upset his fans, though the actor attempted to develop his appeal towards the young audience by becoming a television presenter and a pop singer.

== Sanjay Kapoor ==
Sanjay Kapoor, played by Deepak Verma, is a market trader who has an eye for the ladies and a weakness for gambling. He is always full of big ideas and get-rich-quick schemes, which never work. In 1998, EastEnders acquired a new executive producer, Matthew Robinson. Robinson was dubbed "the axeman" in the British press, after a large proportion of the EastEnders cast either quit, or were culled, shortly after Robinson's introduction. It was reported that Robinson hoped the changes would attract more viewers and "spice up [the soap's fictional setting of] Walford". Among the departing characters were long-running Asian family the Kapoors, including Sanjay, Gita (Shobu Kapoor) and Neelam Kapoor (Jamila Massey). As they were the only Asian characters in the show, EastEnders received criticism for axing them from MPs including Oona King, MP for East End constituency Bethnal Green and Dr Ashok Kumar.

== Gita Kapoor ==
Gita Kapoor, played by Shobu Kapoor, has a fierce temper, which is needed to keep her troublesome husband in check. Any success they achieve is down to her. She is the brains behind the Kapoor's clothes business. Gita played by Shobu Kapoor and her husband Sanjay (Deepak Verma) were introduced early in 1993 by producer Leonard Lewis. They were the first characters of Asian descent to be introduced since the Karim family, who departed from the serial in 1990. The Kapoors are the programme's first attempt to portray non-Muslim Asian characters; the Kapoors are practising Hindus, descending from India. Shobu Kapoor auditioned for the role of Gita along with actress Nina Wadia. Both had been working together on a play prior to auditioning, and neither knew that the other would be attending the audition until they bumped into each other at the casting call. It was Kapoor who was offered the part; Wadia would later go on to play another character years later, Zainab Masood.

== Snip Gibbons ==
Snip Gibbons
- EastEnders character
- Portrayed by: Steve Sweeney
- First appearance: Episode 841; 23 February 1993
- Last appearance: Episode 847; 16 March 1993
In-universe information
- Occupation: Car salesman

Clive "Snip" Gibbons, played by Steve Sweeney, is a friend of Phil (Steve McFadden) and Grant Mitchell (Ross Kemp). He begins frequenting The Queen Victoria pub at the invitation of the Mitchells in February 1993, along with several of their other friends. Nigel Bates (Paul Bradley) shows obvious dislike for Snip, mainly because he is frequently teased and tormented by him. Bar manager, Clyde Tavernier (Steven Woodcock), also has several run-ins with him. Snip orders him around, acts in a rowdy manner and antagonises him. Clyde becomes too annoyed so he throws Snip and his friends out of The Vic one night, much to the anger of Phil and Grant, who are trying to secure a business deal with Snip.

When Snip and his friends refuse to vacate the pub after closing time one evening, Clyde threatens to quit his job unless they leave. They don't, so Clyde quits but he contacts his boss, Sharon Mitchell (Letitia Dean), who is holidaying in America. Sharon returns to find that many of her regulars are refusing to drink at The Vic, mainly because of Snip. She takes control and bars Grant's friends (including Snip) from the pub.

== Audrey Whittingham ==
Audrey Whittingham
- EastEnders character
- Portrayed by: Shirley Dixon
- First appearance: Episode 844; 4 March 1993
- Last appearance: Episode 848; 18 March 1993
In-universe information
- Sons: Michael Whittingham; John Whittingham

Audrey Whittingham, played by Shirley Dixon, kidnaps Vicki Fowler (Samantha Leigh Martin) while she is waiting to be collected outside Walford Primary School. A police investigation is launched. Prime suspect is Jack Woodman (James Gilbey), who is infatuated with Vicki's mother Michelle Fowler (Susan Tully); however, Audrey and Vicki are identified by the shopkeeper of a toy store several days later. Audrey had used a cheque to pay for Vicki's toys and the police were able to trace her to her home. Vicki is returned to her mother unharmed and Audrey is arrested.

Michelle becomes very emotional and protective over Vicki for a while after, refusing to let her outside or attend school. She think she can see glimpses of Audrey everywhere she goes, which everyone tells her is impossible, as Audrey has been imprisoned. However, Michelle isn't being paranoid as Audrey turns up on her doorstep shortly after hoping to explain her actions. She has endured a series of tragedies, starting with the death of her baby daughter many years earlier, and later in life the death of one of her sons and her husband. Her other son lives abroad and she has become lonely and desperate. She began to wonder what her daughter would have turned out like and when she saw Vicki alone she decided to take her, although she claims that she intended to bring her back eventually. Michelle is furious and can not forgive Audrey for the trauma she put her and Vicki through.

== Sharmilla Kapoor ==
Sharmilla Kapoor
- EastEnders character
- Portrayed by: Priya Bilkhu
- Duration: 1993–1998
- First appearance: Episode 848; 18 March 1993
- Last appearance: Episode 1673; 24 September 1998
In-universe information
- Father: Sanjay Kapoor
- Mother: Gita Kapoor
- Half-brothers: Arjun Kapoor
- Grandmothers: Neelam Kapoor
- Aunts: Meena McKenzie

Sharmilla Kapoor, played by Priya Bilkhu, is the daughter of Sanjay and Gita Kapoor (Deepak Verma and Shobu Kapoor), born a month after they arrive in Walford in 1993.

In October 1997, she leaves with her mother to stay with relatives. They are due to return in January 1998, but Sanjay is late to collect them from the station. When he arrives Gita is nowhere to be seen. When there was no sign of Gita or Sharmilla days later, Sanjay contacts the police. Months later, they are still missing and coincidental evidence has led the police to think that Sanjay may have been responsible for their disappearance. He is even arrested and accused of murder, although he is later released without charge. Everyone assumes that Gita and Sharmilla are dead. But in July 1998 Sanjay finds Gita in Birmingham with a new baby boy, Arjun, conceived during a one-night stand. He takes his family home, vowing to raise Arjun as his own. Sanjay and Gita are happy until local reporter Polly Becker (Victoria Gould) discovers their recent scandal and gets it published in the Walford Gazette. Suddenly all of Walford know what had transpired in Gita's absence. Reporters make their lives miserable and Sharmilla is even bullied at school, so they finally decide to leave Walford with Sharmilla in September 1998.

== Sylvia Weng-Chung ==
Sylvia Weng-Chung
- EastEnders character
- Portrayed by: Rachel Hiew
- First appearance: Episode 852; 1 April 1993
- Last appearance: Episode 921; 30 November 1993
In-universe information
- Occupation: Waitress

Sylvia Weng-Chung, played by Rachel Hiew, is introduced on 1 April 1993. Hiew believed her real-life waitressing experience helped her secure the role. She explained that she served the food well during her audition, but while filming her first scene, she accidentally dropped the food all over the place. An Inside Soap writer described Sylvia as "a bit of a wild child who speaks her mind", and thought Kathy Beale (Gillian Taylforth) does not know what she was letting herself in for when she hires Sylvia to work in her café. Of her character's personality, Hiew stated: "She's a manic partygoer and she wears the sort of clothes I'd never have the nerve to put on!"

When Ian Beale's (Adam Woodyatt) catering business is closed down, his wife Cindy Beale (Michelle Collins) turns to Kathy for help. Kathy employs Ian to work in her café, but as a result, she becomes overstaffed and is forced to fire Sylvia in November 1993. Sylvia is extremely angry and says several unpleasant things about Kathy and her café before departing. Sylvia's surname is never mentioned on screen, and only stated on her official cast card.

== Gidea Thompson ==
Gidea Thompson
- EastEnders character
- Portrayed by: Sian Martin
- First appearance: Episode 865; 18 May 1993
- Last appearance: Episode 884; 22 July 1993
In-universe information
- Mother: Elizabeth Thompson
- Grandfathers: Jules Tavernier
- Grandmothers: Dorothy
- Uncles: Celestine Tavernier
- First cousins: Clyde Tavernier; Hattie Tavernier
- Other relatives: Kofi Tavernier

Gidea Thompson, played by Sian Martin, made her first appearance on 18 May 1993. Martin recalled that her mother's cleaning lady prayed for her when she auditioned for the role, so when she got it, she immediately went to see her and gave her a hug. Martin admitted that nerves led her to appear awkward and clumsy during her first days on set, so someone had to tell her to correct the way she walked, as she looked ungainly. Martin's character Gidea was introduced as a "mysterious long-lost relative of the Taverniers". An Inside Soap writer observed that her short stint would impact the family for years to come. Martin said Gidea's presence "blows up some of the other problems within the family. Things are going to change. People will be coming back and people will be leaving." She also said that things between Gidea and her cousin Clyde Tavernier (Steven Woodcock) would "get pretty steamy", but Gidea initially sees their relationship as just a holiday romance, so Cylde could be hurt if he takes things too seriously.

Gidea comes to Walford from Trinidad to visit her grandfather, Jules Tavernier (Tommy Eytle). Gidea's mother was the result of an affair Jules had in his early 20s and Jules had previously been unaware of her existence. Jules is apprehensive about pursuing a relationship with Gidea at first, and Gidea's arrival upsets the 'status quo' in the Tavernier family. Hattie Tavernier (Michelle Gayle) takes an instant dislike to her. Gidea decides to leave Walford in the same month; however, her cousin Clyde Tavernier has grown close to her, so he sets about searching London to track her down. The following month, Clyde manages to find her, and after much persuading, Gidea decides to return to Walford so she can get to know her family. She meets her uncle Celestine Tavernier (Leroy Golding) when he returns for Hattie's cancelled wedding, and tells him Jules is her grandfather. She also supports a pregnant Hattie, who considers having an abortion and later changes her mind. Gidea and Clyde grow a lot closer, and even though they are half-cousins, they embark on a relationship. Clyde tries to convince Gidea to extend her visa, but she tells him that she is only in England for a holiday and her life is back in Trinidad. Jules is opposed to their relationship and tries to put a stop to it, but Gidea and Clyde ignore his protests and they eventually decide to leave Walford for a new life together in Trinidad with Clyde's son Kofi Tavernier (Marcel Smith).

== Debbie Bates ==
Debbie Bates, played by Nicola Duffett, appears from 1993 to 1995. She was introduced as a love-interest for Nigel Bates (Paul Bradley), but was killed off in 1995 on Duffett's request. Duffett grew weary of playing Debbie saying she became too boring and drippy, and asked the producers of EastEnders to kill her character off in 1995, which they did; Debbie was killed in a hit-and-run motor accident. Duffett has commented, "I left EastEnders of my own accord, without a shadow of a doubt. I begged to be killed. I ran to the script editor's office. Every time I see him at a party he says, 'I'll never forget you.' Because I ran in crying, 'Kill me NOW! I can't stand it.' Because the part was so boring. I played this simpering wimp, Debbie. All I did was walk into the Vic and say, 'Where's Nigel?'" Duffett has stated that she has no regrets about leaving the role, and that she wanted her character killed so she had no opportunity to ever return as she worried about being typecast.

== Nadia Mitchell ==
Nadia Mitchell
- EastEnders character
- Portrayed by: Anna Barkan
- Duration: 1993–1994
- First appearance: Episode 877; 29 June 1993
- Last appearance: Episode 1019; 29 August 1994
- Introduced by: Leonard Lewis
In-universe information
- Other names: Nadia Borovac
- Family: Mitchell
- Husband: Phil Mitchell (1993–1994)

Nadia Mitchell (also Borovac), played by Anna Barkan, is Phil Mitchell's (Steve McFadden) first wife. They have a marriage of convenience so Nadia can stay in the country, but Phil soon regrets his decision as a result of personal problems between them.

=== Storylines ===
Nadia Borovac first came to Albert Square in June 1993 and she soon catches the attention of local hardman Phil Mitchell (Steve McFadden). They soon bond up to the point where Nadia admits to Phil her reasons for coming in to the square. Phil responds by giving fellow neighbour Hattie Tavernier (Michelle Gayle) a lift to Southampton so she can stop her boyfriend, Steve Elliot (Mark Monero), from leaving the country. Phil waits for her in a nearby bar and meets Nadia. Nadia is a Romanian refugee who came over to England to be with her boyfriend, Marku (Ravil Isyanov) – another immigrant, who has been able to stay in the UK due to a marriage of convenience with an English woman. Nadia is sure that she will be deported. Feeling sorry for her, Phil agrees to marry her so she can stay in the country. He brings her to Walford and they marry on 8 July 1993. Nadia then leaves to live with her boyfriend. Nadia returns in November, needing Phil to play her husband in more realistic ways to prevent her from being deported. While she has been away, Phil has started dating Kathy Beale (Gillian Taylforth) and has not told Kathy about Nadia. When he does tell Kathy, she takes an instant dislike to Nadia. Nadia persuades Phil to allow her to move in with him while the home office investigate and convinces the representative that the relationship is legitimate. However, she does not tell Phil this so he feels that he has no choice but to let her live with him.

Feeling jealous of her husband's real girlfriend, Nadia makes things as difficult as possible for them and finally seduces Phil at Christmas 1993 and sleeps with him. Phil regrets it instantly, but Nadia refuses to give up and after getting drunk, she tells Kathy about their tryst. Phil denies it and throws Nadia out in January 1994. She disappears after Grant Mitchell (Ross Kemp) threatens to kill her if he ever sees her again. Phil and Kathy decide to get married later that year and consequently he goes looking for Nadia as he needs to find her but is unsuccessful. However, Phil visits Marku and finds Nadia with him. She is still angry about the way Phil and Grant had treated her and when Phil asks for a divorce, she refuses. Phil threatens to report her to the authorities, but she promises that if he does, she will disappear and he will then have to wait another two years for a divorce without her consent. However, the following week, Nadia returns to Walford and tells Phil she will divorce him and move to Germany if he gives her £1,000. Phil is angry about her blackmail but has no choice so he gives her the money, after which Nadia leaves and is not seen again.

== Clare Bates ==
Clare Bates, played by Gemma Bissix, appears from 1993 to 1998, and again in 2008. She first left the serial with her screen stepfather Nigel Bates, when his actor Paul Bradley opted to leave. After a ten-year hiatus, Bissix returned to the role on 1 February 2008. The character was transformed from "cute and sweet" into a gold digging "maneater", chasing wealthy men for their money. The British media focused on the character's penchant for revealing clothing, and while she was praised by some critics, it was suggested that she was underused upon her return. Bissix again left EastEnders at the end of her contract in the summer of 2008. Her departing episode first aired on 7 August 2008.

== Meena McKenzie ==
Meena McKenzie
- EastEnders character
- Portrayed by: Sudha Bhuchar
- Duration: 1993–1994, 1996
- First appearance: Episode 884; 22 July 1993
- Last appearance: Episode 1236; 11 January 1996
- Introduced by: Leonard Lewis (1993); Corinne Hollingworth (1996)
In-universe information
- Sisters: Gita Kapoor
- Husband: Jerry McKenzie (until 1994)
- Nephews: Arjun Kapoor
- Nieces: Sharmilla Kapoor

Meena McKenzie, played by Sudha Bhuchar, is the sister of Gita Kapoor (Shobu Kapoor). Meena and Gita's husband, Sanjay Kapoor (Deepak Verma) do not get along with each other, so when Gita suspects Sanjay of having an affair in 1993, Meena is the last person she expects; she discovers their infidelity by catching them in bed together. The Kapoors separate for a while and the McKenzies marriage ends, while Gita refuses to see her sister ever again. However, Gita eventually forgives Sanjay, and in 1995, Meena constructs a ploy to make contact with her sister again.

She instructs her new fiancé, Guppy Sharma (Lyndam Gregory), to liaise with Gita about a business proposition for their clothing stall while keeping his connection to Meena a secret. However, Guppy and Gita develop feelings for each other, although nothing sexual occurs. When Meena eventually unveils that she had masterminded Guppy and Gita's meeting in January 1996, she is furious to discover that Guppy is actually smitten with Gita and has kissed her. Refusing to believe that Guppy feels anything for Gita other than pity, Meena goes ahead with her plan to marry Guppy, although Guppy later reveals that the wedding was cancelled. Meena is not seen again after this.

== Zoe Newton ==
Zoe Newton
- EastEnders character
- Portrayed by: Elizabeth Chadwick (1993); Tara Ellis (2000–2001)
- Duration: 1993, 2001
- First appearance: Episode 885; 27 July 1993
- Last appearance: Episode 2125; 21 June 2001
- Introduced by: Leonard Lewis (1993); John Yorke (2001)
- Spin-off appearances: Return of Nick Cotton (2000)
In-universe information
- Brothers: Eddie Newton
- Sons: Ashley Cotton

Zoe Newton (also Cotton), played by Elizabeth Chadwick in 1993 and then by Tara Ellis in a spin-off episode in 2000 and a few episodes in 2001, arrives in Walford as the girlfriend of Nick Cotton (John Altman), along with their son Ashley (Rossi Higgins). She was in an on and off relationship with Nick since 1982 but had not appeared previously in Walford and had never met Nick's mother Dot (June Brown) until she arrives in 1993. She is keen that Dot gets a chance to meet her grandson, and Dot and Ashley eventually grow close after a few meetings. She and Nick are planning to move away to Gravesend and Zoe wants Dot to come and live with them. Dot is reluctant at first but later agrees to move away and leaves Walford with them in August 1993.

When Dot returns to Walford in 1997 she reveals that off-screen Zoe and Ashley had moved away after Zoe grew tired of Nick's criminal activities and he had been arrested for drugs possession.

Zoe is seen onscreen in a special spin-off episode entitled Return of Nick Cotton which first aired on 1 October 2000. In the episode, Nick is released from prison and reunites with Ashley and Zoe after Zoe's brother Eddie tells Nick about her whereabouts. Zoe isn't happy to see him back and offers him money and a divorce to leave for good. Some thugs then come after him. After trying to escape from the thugs, he and Ashley steal a car to escape them. Zoe doesn't want Ashley to go with Nick knowing how much of a bad influence he is but she cannot stop him and he drives off with Nick back to Walford.

When Nick and Ashley return to Walford in November 2000, Nick gets into a feud with his old enemy Mark Fowler (Todd Carty). It leads to Nick cutting the brakes on Mark's motorbike in June 2001. Ashley steals the bike and dies after crashing into a shop window. Zoe is devastated when she returns for his funeral and attacks Nick, blaming him for Ashley's death. She knew that Nick would never be a good father to Ashley and Ashley should have never come with Nick to Walford. After the funeral, she leaves Walford and has not been seen or heard from since.

== Ashley Cotton ==
Ashley Cotton, played by Rossi Higgins in 1993 and then by Frankie Fitzgerald in 2000 to 2001, is the son of Nick Cotton (John Altman). The character first appears in July 1993, after coming to Walford for the first time with his mother and meeting his grandmother, Dot (June Brown). However, in August he leaves Walford with his family to move to Gravesend. Writing for The People in July 2000, Sharon Marshall revealed Ashley would be returning to EastEnders now played by Frankie Fitzgerald. Fitzgerald was appearing in a variety show when he was spotted by a talent scout who suggested he send some photos to the BBC's casting department. A few months later, Fitzgerald was asked to audition for the role of Ashley. While on his way home from the audition, Fitzgerald was told he had won the part. Marshall revealed Fitzgerald was hired after producers noted his resemblance to John Altman, who plays his on screen father, Nick. An EastEnders spokesperson said "They could easily be father and son. They've got the same brooding dark-haired looks." Marshall said Fitzgerald was set to "steal the show – as well as a few young Walford hearts" as Ashley. She also stated the character would be a chip off the old block, spelling trouble for the residents of Albert Square. Of his casting, Fitzgerald said "I am thrilled and honoured to be playing Nick Cotton's son and can't wait to work with John. People keep asking me what the storylines are but I am as eager as everyone to know." Fitzgerald made his debut as Ashley on 27 July 2000, and appeared until June 2001.

== Liam Tyler ==
Liam Tyler
- EastEnders character
- Portrayed by: Francis Magee
- Duration: 1993–1995
- First appearance: Episode 889; 10 August 1993
- Last appearance: Episode 1211; 16 November 1995
- Introduced by: Leonard Lewis
In-universe information
- Wife: Debbie Palmer (until 1993)
- Daughters: Clare Bates
- Granddaughters: Bella

Liam Tyler, played by Francis Magee, is the biological father of Clare Bates (Gemma Bissix) and the former husband of Debbie Bates (Nicola Duffett). Liam first appears not long after Debbie and Clare arrive in Albert Square, having tracked them down after he had been abusing Debbie. Liam does everything in his power to split up Debbie and her new love interest, Nigel Bates (Paul Bradley), but his efforts fail.

Liam returns to the Square again after Debbie's sudden death in 1995, attempting to gain custody of Clare. Clare wants to stay with Nigel and a court case ensues. Nigel ultimately wins when Liam's girlfriend Caroline Webber (Francesca Hall) admits that he had been abusive toward her.

== Jerry McKenzie ==
Jerry McKenzie
- EastEnders character
- Portrayed by: Brian Capron
- Duration: 1993–1994
- First appearance: Episode 916; 11 November 1993
- Last appearance: Episode 938; 25 January 1994
- Introduced by: Leonard Lewis
In-universe information
- Wife: Meena McKenzie (until 1994)

Jerry McKenzie, portrayed by Brian Capron, is the husband of Meena McKenzie. He is first seen when he goes out with Meena, his sister-in-law, Gita Kapoor (Shobu Kapoor), and her husband, Sanjay Kapoor (Deepak Verma). Gita suspects Sanjay of having an affair with Michelle Fowler (Susan Tully), but she finds Meena in bed with Sanjay. After Gita tells Jerry, Jerry confronts Meena and she claims that Gita is lying, but later says she slept with him once. Jerry believes Meena when she tells him that she was drunk and Sanjay took advantage of her, but Sanjay tells him the affair went on for months and Meena wanted to. Jerry and Meena reconcile and Gita is angry when she learns they are going on a second honeymoon and Jerry gives Meena some money to help her out.

== Bianca Jackson ==
Bianca Butcher (also Jackson) is played by Patsy Palmer. The character was introduced by executive producer Leonard Lewis and appeared initially from 1993 to 1999, when Palmer opted to leave. In 2002 executive producer John Yorke brought the character back for a special spin-off show. She returned to EastEnders as a full-time character in April 2008, reintroduced by executive producer Diederick Santer. Palmer took maternity leave in 2010, and Bianca was temporarily written out on 21 January 2011. She announced her return on 19 July and made her return on 15 December 2011.

During her first run on the show during the 1990s, she is known for her bizarre sense of style, her sharp tongue and fiery temper and for screaming "Rickaaaaaaay!" at her husband. Bianca has been featured in storylines including affairs, feuds, bereavements, family problems, spina bifida and abortion, a problematic marriage to Ricky Butcher (Sid Owen) and the revelation of her 15-year-old adoptive daughter Whitney Dean (Shona McGarty) being sexually abused by her fiancé Tony King (Chris Coghill) and his subsequent arrest for paedophilia.

== Alan Jackson ==
Alan Jackson is played by Howard Antony. He originally appears between 1993 and 1997, and returns on 12 October 2010 for three episodes. Kind-hearted Alan gives the Jackson family some much needed stability. He loves and cares for Carol's (Lindsey Coulson) children as if they are his own. Their relationship does not go so smoothly, however. Carol's stubborn and nagging nature eventually drives him into the arms of another woman. Alan has been described as a good, reliable, hard-working father and well integrated into his community. Alan's main storyline during his initial four years in EastEnders surrounds his interracial marriage to Carol Jackson and being a paternal figure to Carol's children, three of whom were fathered by other men. Antony has revealed that his portrayal was partly based on his own life experiences, as he had grown up with siblings with different fathers to his own. Antony told author Larry Jaffee, "Alan was so family oriented, but I liked that a young black guy who was very responsible, mature – that was something that I was very comfortable with because it was something I grew up with to a point. To me, if you love someone you love everything about them. It's not 'I love you, but I don't love your kids'. It was something I was very glad to do. The whole black-and-white thing, I think we're at a stage now that people are more informed."

== Carol Jackson ==
Carol Jackson, played by Lindsey Coulson, was introduced in 1993 as part of a new problem family. Coulson decided to quit the role in 1997, but she returned temporarily in 1999 as part of a storyline that marked Carol's daughter Bianca's (Patsy Palmer exit. On 25 October 2009 it was confirmed that she would return along with other members of the Jackson family, Sonia (Natalie Cassidy), Robbie (Dean Gaffney) and Billie (Devon Anderson), on 15 February 2010, although her first appearance in 2010 is in EastEnders: Last Tango in Walford, an episode released exclusively to DVD on 8 February 2010. 1994 was a historic year for EastEnders, as in April, a third weekly episode was introduced. Due to the programme's increased frequency, a number of new characters were introduced to the regular cast in the latter part of 1993 and early 1994. Among them were the Jackson family: mother Carol, her four children, Bianca, Robbie, Sonia and Billie, as well as Carol's partner Alan Jackson (Howard Antony). Though Carol and Alan are not initially married in the serial, and though Alan is only the biological father of Billie, the whole family took on Alan's surname. The family was created by writer Tony McHale. None of the actors cast as the Jackson family were matched for appearance or screen compatibility. Cassidy has commented, "it was all decided without doing that. I don't think it particularly mattered that none of us Jackson kids looked like each other because all our characters had different dads!" Carol was Coulson's first major television role.

== Sonia Fowler ==
Sonia Fowler (also Jackson), played by Natalie Cassidy, is the youngest daughter of Carol Jackson (Lindsey Coulson). Her first appearance is on 2 December 1993 and she leaves on 2 February 2007. However, she returns briefly in 2010 along with other members of the Jackson family and re-appears on the soap from 8 to 18 February 2010. She returns again for a single episode on 21 January 2011. Natalie Cassidy won the award for "Best Actress" for the role of Sonia, at the 2001 British Soap Awards. Additionally, in 2004, Cassidy was awarded "best dramatic performance by a young actor or actress" for the role. Referencing Sonia's foray into lesbianism in 2005, TV critic Grace Dent branded the character "the worst lesbian ever", adding, "The only lesbians with less lesbian tendencies than you are the women on the front cover of the Horny Triple-X Lesbian Specials which they keep at eye level by the sweets in my corner shop. Time to make a u-turn." Lesbian website AfterEllen.com was also critical of the storyline that saw Sonia experimenting with her sexuality and then returning to her heterosexual orientation shortly after.

== Billie Jackson ==
Billie Jackson, played by Devon Anderson from 1993 to 1997 and again in 2010, and by Bluey Robinson for a brief spell in 2004, is the son of Carol and Alan Jackson (Lindsey Coulson and Howard Antony). After initially leaving in 1997, Billie returns in 2010, along with other members of the Jackson family. It was confirmed in November 2009 that Anderson would reprise the role, 13 years after he was last seen on the soap. He made his return on 4 February 2010. The character was killed off in October 2010, and made his last credited appearance on 14 October. Billie's death was nominated in the 'Best Single Episode' category at the 2011 British Soap Awards. In October 2011, Anderson was nominated for one award, at the Screen Nation Awards which celebrate the best British Black talent. He was nominated for the Emerging Talent award.

== Lucy Beale ==
Lucy Beale, played by Eva Brittin-Snell from 1993 to 1996, Casey Anne Rothery from 1996 until 2004, Melissa Suffield from 2004 to 2010 and Hetti Bywater from 2012 to 2015 is the daughter of Ian (Adam Woodyatt) and Cindy Beale (Michelle Collins). She is the twin sister of Peter (Thomas Law), and has three half siblings, older brother Steven (Edward Savage, Aaron Sidwell), younger sister Cindy (Eva Sayer) and younger brother Bobby (Alex Francis). Apart from her on-screen birth, the character has few storylines of her own until 2004 when the role was recast to an older actress. Storylines featuring Lucy have since focused upon her teenage rebellion. In 2010, Suffield left EastEnders, after she was allegedly axed due to "unruly behaviour". On 14 November 2011, it was announced Lucy would be returning in 2012 with Bywater taking over the role. She returned on 12 January 2012. In February 2014 it was announced that the character would be killed off. She made her final appearance on 22 April 2014 when her father goes to identify her body. In July 2007, Gareth McLean of The Guardian lamented the lack of strong female characters in EastEnders, noting that Lucy "is yet to come into her own". Fellow Guardian critic Grace Dent commented on the repetitive nature of EastEnders storylines by comparing Lucy's relationship with Jane (Laurie Brett) to the fraught mother-daughter bond between Kat (Jessie Wallace) and Zoe Slater (Michelle Ryan).

== Peter Beale ==
Peter Beale, played by Francis Brittin-Snell from 1993 to 1996, Alex Stevens from 1997 to 1998, Joseph Shade from 1998 to 2004, James Martin from 2004 to 2006, Thomas Law from 2006 until 2010, Ben Hardy from 2013 to 2015 and Dayle Hudson from 2020 to 2022, is the son of Ian (Adam Woodyatt) and Cindy Beale (Michelle Collins). He is the twin brother of Lucy (Hetti Bywater), and has three half siblings, older brother Steven (Edward Savage, Aaron Sidwell), younger sister Cindy (Eva Sayer) and younger brother Bobby (Alex Francis). Peter left EastEnders on 24 December 2010, with a return not ruled out but unconfirmed. Peter was introduced in 1993 along with his twin sister Lucy, and was originally played by Francis Brittin-Snell as a baby and toddler from 1993 to 1996. In 1997, the role was given to Alex Stevens and he played Peter until 1998. Joseph Shade took over until 2004 and James Martin played him from 2004 until 2006. It was announced on 17 August 2006 that actor Thomas Law had been cast as Peter. Law said of the role: "I couldn't believe it when I heard that I got the part, I'm really excited as I am a big fan of EastEnders." He made his first appearance on 31 August 2006. He is described on the EastEnders website as being laid back, and Ian's "golden boy". In May 2009, Executive producer Diederick Santer praised the younger cast of EastEnders, including Law. Stuart Heritage from The Guardian expressed a dislike for Peter in April 2010, saying he should be written out, "before his increasingly spectacular haircut goes power mad and starts to colonise the entire set. Also, his voice has been breaking for what seems like seven full years, so he could probably use his new-found free time to consult a doctor or something."

== Kevin ==
Kevin
- EastEnders character
- Portrayed by: John Pickard
- Duration: 1993–1996
- First appearance: Episode 926; 16 December 1993
- Last appearance: Episode 1251; 15 February 1996

Kevin, played by John Pickard, is a recurring character appearing from 1993 to 1996. He is the teenage friend of Robbie Jackson (Dean Gaffney), who first appears along with Robbie in December 1993. He and Robbie frequently get into trouble doing such things as stealing alcohol from The Queen Victoria public house. They joyride Frank Butcher's (Mike Reid) car and crash it into Michelle Fowler's (Susan Tully) wall on Albert Square in April 1994. Robbie is left unconscious in the wreckage, while Kevin flees home, fearing the repercussions. Robbie isn't seriously harmed, and manages to avoid trouble from the police because he is a minor. Kevin eventually pays for the damage in July 1994, after inheriting money from his recently deceased grandmother.

Kevin is with Robbie in October 1994, when they find Wellard the dog, who becomes Robbie's inseparable sidekick. Kevin also attends the Jacksons' house party in January 1995, where he gets extremely drunk and tries unsuccessfully to seduce all of Bianca Jackson's (Patsy Palmer) friends. He is forced to help clear the mess the following day after a riot breaks out at the party and the police are called in. Later in the year, Robbie is fired from his paper round, for dumping all the newspapers without delivering them. Kevin goes behind his back and takes the job, then proceeds to call on Robbie's old customers for a Christmas bonus.

Kevin and Robbie try another money making scheme in December 1995, when they go carol singing under the guise that they are collecting money for the widow of a deceased scoutmaster. Robbie's sister, Bianca, finds out about the scam and blackmails them into giving her a cut of their proceeds. This eventually leads to further scamming, when they attend a pensioners bingo night at an old people's home. However, they are caught out when one of the residents turns out to be the widow of the deceased scoutmaster and they are forced to hand over all their profits to her. Kevin last appears in February 1996, where he and Robbie get a free haircut from a trainee hairdresser. Robbie is given highlights, which turn out disastrously, much to Kevin's amusement.

== Robbie Jackson ==
Robbie Jackson, played by Dean Gaffney from 1993 to 2003, is the eldest son of Carol Jackson (Lindsey Coulson). The character was axed in 2003 by executive producer Louise Berridge. He makes brief returns in 2004 and 2010 for two family weddings, and in 2015 for Carol's exit storyline. Introduced as a 15-year-old school boy, Robbie is initially portrayed as troublesome; frequently playing truant, occasionally shoplifting and, as author Kate Lock suggests, "generally making a nuisance of himself". However, Lock observes that this aspect of the character was toned down eventually, and "the unfortunate Robbie became less of a lout and more of a [...] prat, forever mucking things up and being the fall guy." Gaffney reprised the role briefly in 2004, when he returned as Robbie to attend his sister Sonia's (Natalie Cassidy) wedding. The character's return was only scripted for a couple of episodes. Gaffney has expressed an interest in returning, commenting in 2006. On 25 October 2009, it was announced that Gaffney would once again reprise his role. The family return for Bianca's (Patsy Palmer) second wedding to Ricky Butcher (Sid Owen) as part of the show's 25th anniversary. Executive producer Diederick Santer explained that he wanted great stories to get people talking, saying "The wedding is the perfect opportunity for us to bring back the much-loved Jackson characters – Carol, Sonia, Robbie and Billie (Devon Anderson)."

== Nellie Ellis ==
Nellie Ellis, played by Elizabeth Kelly, was introduced as the interfering relative of Pauline Fowler (Wendy Richard) in 1993 and appears regularly until 1998. She makes a further guest appearance in 2000 for the funeral of Ethel Skinner (Gretchen Franklin). Nellie has been described as a "pantomime baddie". Her name precedes her in the soap before her initial appearance as she is frequently used as an excuse for Pauline to leave the soap's setting to visit her. Author Kate Lock described Nellie as stingy and an interfering old busybody. She stated, "When stingy Nellie wasn't giving Arthur (Bill Treacher) grief, she was flirting in a button-up sort of way with Jules Tavernier (Tommy Eytle)."

== David Wicks ==
David Wicks, played by Michael French, originally appears between 1993 and 1996. He returns on 1 January 2012, for the departure storyline of his mother Pat Butcher (Pam St Clement), and departs again on 13 January 2012. In September 2011, it was rumoured that David and Simon Wicks (Nick Berry) were to return to EastEnders for Pat's departure storyline. A BBC spokesperson declined to comment on the report, saying: "There has been a lot of speculation surrounding Pat's departure; however, we are not going to comment on rumours at this stage as we don't want to spoil the storyline for viewers." On 13 November 2011, it was confirmed French would be reprising his role as David after an absence of 15 years. In All About Soap Awards 2012, Michael French won the Best Comeback award for his brief return as David Wicks. It was confirmed in July 2013 that David will return to EastEnders later in the year. David returned in September 2013, but in May 2014 (eight months after his return), French announced he was to leave the show again. David left the show on 30 May 2014, following the breakdown of his relationship with Carol Jackson (Lindsey Coulson).

== Others ==
Character	Date(s)	Actor	Circumstances
Ranjit	20 April	Rashpal Marwal	Hired DJs for a rave arranged by Steve Elliot (Mark Monero).
Olly	20 April	Sam Curtis	Hired DJs for a rave arranged by Steve Elliot (Mark Monero).
Mitch	22 April, 4, 6 & 13 May (4 episodes)	Tony Bluto	
Mr Woodman	29 April	Peter Kelly	Jack Woodman's (James Gilbey) father and stepmother.
Mrs Woodman	29 April	Helen Blizard	Jack Woodman's (James Gilbey) father and stepmother.
Dr Simian	6 May	Victoria Carling	The Doctor who attends to Aidan Brosnan (Sean Maguire) following his collapse after taking ecstasy.
Mr Mingus	9 May	Nick Ellsworth	A lawyer who Frank Butcher (Mike Reid) visits regarding his wife Pat's (Pam St. Clement) trial following a fatal hit-and-run accident on Christmas Eve. Mingus tells Frank that the worst case scenario would be Pat being sentenced to five years imprisonment.
Jackie	11–13 May, 22 July; 14 December (4 episodes)	Susan Brown	Alfie Chapman's cousin.
Sanger	11–13 May (2 episodes)	Andrew Francis	Jackie's husband.
Terry Richardson	13 May 1993, 26 December 1994 (2 episodes)	Ben Lemel	A friend of Phil Mitchell.
Greg Hewitt	1–17 June, 21 September (6 episodes)	Robert Swann	Christine Hewitt's (Elizabeth Power) estranged husband and the father of their son, Jonathan (Jonny Lee Miller). He returns to Walford after finishing with his mistress in a bid to win Christine back. She reluctantly agrees to let him stay. When Arthur Fowler (Bill Treacher), Christine's lover arrives at the Hewitt house, he and Greg are equally shocked to meet each other. Greg soon catches Arthur and Christine together and demands Christine finish with Arthur but she refuses. Greg pays Arthur's wife, Pauline a visit much to Arthur's shock. Arthur then quickly pretends that Greg is a gardening associate who dislikes him. After Greg leaves, he and Arthur soon come to blows in the square but the fight is quickly broken up by Phil Mitchell (Steve McFadden) and Greg drives away. At home, Greg gives Christine a final choice, him or Arthur and she chooses Arthur and Greg leaves. Three months later, Greg files for divorce, citing Christine's adultery with Arthur.
Gummy	7 September 1993	Brendan Lyons	A man who is friends with Nick Cotton (John Altman), and along with him steals Nigel Bates's (Paul Bradley) belongings from Dot Cotton's (June Brown) house after she'd moved. Mark Fowler (Todd Carty) goes into the house to see what is going on, and Nick demands Gummy to get him out. Mark punches Gummy and knocks him unconscious with his motorbike helmet and demands that he and Nick give Nigel his belongings back.
Anne	14 September 1993	Lindsey Wilson	Two sex workers who attack Mandy Salter (Nicola Stapleton) for "clipping" on the streets of King's Cross. The fight ends when they are all arrested.
Lilian	14 September 1993	Charlotte Bicknell	Two sex workers who attack Mandy Salter (Nicola Stapleton) for "clipping" on the streets of King's Cross. The fight ends when they are all arrested.
Mrs Andreos	21 September 1993 – 5 December 1995 (9 episodes)	Madia Stavrinou	An employee of First 'Til Last. She employs Mandy Salter (Nicola Stapleton) and Aidan Brosnan (Sean Maguire) to stack shelves and clean up, but she has to let them go when her nephew comes over from Greece. She later accuses Mandy and Aidan of theft because they were in the shop and did not buy anything, though Aidan denies this.
