= Dimensions in Time =

1993 Doctor Who charity special

- Doctor Who charity special (crossover with EastEnders)
- 18 November 1993 Radio Times cover promoting the special

Cast
- Doctors: Sylvester McCoy – Seventh Doctor; Colin Baker – Sixth Doctor; Peter Davison – Fifth Doctor; Tom Baker – Fourth Doctor; Jon Pertwee – Third Doctor
- Companions: Sophie Aldred – Ace; John Leeson – Voice of K9; Bonnie Langford – Melanie Bush; Nicola Bryant – Peri Brown; Sarah Sutton – Nyssa; Lalla Ward – Romana; Louise Jameson – Leela; Elisabeth Sladen – Sarah Jane Smith; Richard Franklin – Captain Mike Yates; Caroline John – Liz Shaw; Nicholas Courtney – Brigadier Lethbridge-Stewart; Deborah Watling – Victoria Waterfield; Carole Ann Ford – Susan Foreman
- Others: Kate O'Mara – The Rani; Samuel West – Cyrian; Deepak Verma – Sanjay Kapoor; Shobu Kapoor – Gita Kapoor; Wendy Richard – Pauline Fowler; Gillian Taylforth – Kathy Beale; Letitia Dean – Sharon Watts; Pam St. Clement – Pat Butcher; Nicola Stapleton – Mandy Salter; Mike Reid – Frank Butcher; Adam Woodyatt – Ian Beale; Steve McFadden – Phil Mitchell; Ross Kemp – Grant Mitchell; Jane Slaughter – Tracey; Rachel Hiew – Sylvia Weng-Chung

Production
- Directed by: Stuart McDonald
- Written by: John Nathan-Turner; David Roden
- Produced by: John Nathan-Turner
- Music by: Keff McCulloch
- Production code: C280X
- Running time: 2 episodes, 7 minutes and 5 minutes
- First broadcast: 26 November 1993
- Last broadcast: 27 November 1993

Chronology
← Preceded by Survival	Followed by → Doctor Who

Dimensions in Time is a charity television special crossover between the science fiction series Doctor Who and the soap opera EastEnders, broadcast in two parts on 26 and 27 November 1993 for Children in Need. In celebration of Doctor Who's 30th anniversary, it features every surviving actor to have played the Doctor as well as several of the character's companions. In this special, the amoral scientist the Rani (Kate O'Mara) traps various incarnations of the Doctor (Sylvester McCoy, Colin Baker, Peter Davison, Tom Baker and Jon Pertwee) in a time loop in Albert Square.

Doctor Who was put on hiatus in 1989. A 30th anniversary "multi-Doctor" special, The Dark Dimension, began development in mid-1992 but fell through by July 1993. In May 1993, producer John Nathan-Turner was asked to produce a Doctor Who sketch for the charity Children in Need. The script, co-written by Nathan-Turner and David Roden, went through many iterations due to the changing availability of the cast. A crossover with EastEnders was pitched to guarantee publicity for Children in Need and to allow the production to film on existing sets.

The special was filmed in 3D on location at Greenwich and the EastEnders Albert Square set in September 1993. None of the cast or crew were paid for their work due to an agreement with Equity. Dimensions in Time was universally panned by both critics and fans, with criticism aimed at the plot, special effects and cameos from the contemporary cast of EastEnders. Due to Children in Need's high licensing fees, it is unlikely to ever receive a home video release.

== Plot ==
The Rani (Kate O'Mara) plans to trap the Doctor in a time loop in London's East End; she has already ensnared his first and second incarnations in a time tunnel. The Fourth Doctor (Tom Baker) warns his other incarnations.

The Seventh Doctor (Sylvester McCoy) and Ace (Sophie Aldred) are confused when the TARDIS lands near Cutty Sark in 1973. Time jumps and Ace finds herself in 1993 Albert Square with the Sixth Doctor (Colin Baker). They speak to local resident Sanjay (Deepak Verma) and his wife Gita (Shobu Kapoor).

Following another time jump, the Third Doctor (Jon Pertwee) and Mel Bush (Bonnie Langford) learn from an older Pauline Fowler (Wendy Richard) and Kathy Beale (Gillian Taylforth) that it is 2013. Another time jump occurs. In 1973, the Sixth Doctor tells Susan Foreman (Carole Ann Ford) he feels he is being pulled backwards in time, with his companions being drawn back with him.

In 2013, Sarah Jane Smith (Elisabeth Sladen) finds the Third Doctor after chatting with Sharon Watts (Letitia Dean). He deduces that an operator is utilising time distortion to trap him in a 20-year time loop of the years 1973, 1993 and 2013. The Rani releases her menagerie of alien specimens to distract the Doctor. The menagerie attack the Fifth Doctor (Peter Davison), Nyssa (Sarah Sutton) and Peri (Nicola Bryant) in 1993, and after failing to warn Pat Butcher (Pam St Clement) of the danger, the Rani stops them outside the Queen Vic.

The Fifth Doctor summons his remaining selves and becomes the Third Doctor. Mandy Salter (Nicola Stapleton) helps Liz Shaw (Caroline John) run from the Rani. Mike Yates (Richard Franklin) arrives in the Doctor's car Bessie to take him to Brigadier Lethbridge-Stewart (Nicholas Courtney). The Third Doctor becomes the Sixth Doctor after another time jump, and says farewell to the Brigadier. At the Arches in 1993, Phil (Steve McFadden) and Grant Mitchell (Ross Kemp) find Romana (Lalla Ward) looking for the Doctor. The Rani captures her in front of Frank Butcher (Mike Reid). The Third Doctor returns to the TARDIS with Victoria Waterfield (Deborah Watling), explaining that the Rani's control is breaking down.

The Seventh Doctor meets Leela (Louise Jameson), who has escaped from the Rani's menagerie. Alongside Ace and K9 (John Leeson), the Doctor overrides the Rani's computer by harnessing the time tunnel's power, sending the Rani into the time tunnel and freeing all the Doctor's incarnations.

== Production ==
=== Background ===
Doctor Who was put on hiatus after the broadcast of season 26 in 1989, but its producer, John Nathan-Turner, continued to work on various Doctor Who-related BBC projects on a freelance basis. According to Nathan-Turner's memoir, as early as 1990 he pitched a direct-to-video Doctor Who special to mark the series' 30th anniversary in November 1993. Nathan-Turner continued pitching throughout 1991 and 1992, and on two occasions costed the project to prove it could be produced economically. In a memo to Penny Mills (Head of Video Production for BBC Enterprises) on 18 February 1992, he mentioned the special alongside other proposed video releases which could commemorate the 30th anniversary year.

==== The Dark Dimension ====
During the production and launch of the VHS release of Shada in February 1992, Tom Baker expressed his willingness to return for a new Doctor Who story. Doctor Who video sales were a regular source of profit for BBC Enterprises, and on 28 May 1992 a meeting was chaired to examine a "long-term strategy for the continual exploitation of the programme". It was noted that producing an original special would "be giving something back to the fans and not just extracting money from them". Writer Adrian Rigelsford was approached and hired to develop the rough story, which at that time involved a dying Fourth Doctor uniting with a group of children to fight an ecological disaster.

In early June, a meeting was convened to discuss production of a 90-minute direct-to-video Doctor Who special, with Tom Baker being the sole actor to return as the Doctor. Within a short period of time, it was suggested that the incumbent Seventh Doctor (Sylvester McCoy) could be involved; Tom Baker then proposed the involvement of all surviving actors who played the Doctor in supporting roles. (Note: Tom Baker's incarnation was always meant to be the main focus of the story. John Freeman (editor of Doctor Who Magazine) suggested starting the special during the events of Logopolis (1981), where shortly before the Fourth Doctor's fatal fall he would be transported into a mysterious dimension. This would explain Tom Baker's older appearance.) Rigelsford completed his outline of the special, titled Timeflyers, by 21 July. Graeme Harper, who directed the serials The Caves of Androzani (1984) and Revelation of the Daleks (1985), was excited by the script and agreed to direct. Budget and script discussions were held through August and September 1992, and a location recce was held on 8 September. However, budget issues and BBC Enterprises' lack of production experience caused major setbacks. The other Doctor actors were unenthusiastic about the script, retitled The Dark Dimension. Colin Baker criticised the other Doctors' lack of screen time, and Jon Pertwee and Sylvester McCoy later commented that a more experienced writer should have been involved. Pertwee and Peter Davison were unhappy that the production team contacted them directly instead of through their agents. Nathan-Turner pitched his proposed Doctor Who special again in late 1992, apparently unaware of The Dark Dimension. In early 1993 he declined the role of script consultant on The Dark Dimension.

On 10 June 1993, BBC Enterprises formally confirmed the upcoming production of The Dark Dimension starring Tom Baker, with Harper to direct. The shooting script was finalised on 21 June, and with the special now aimed for broadcast instead of video, Alan Yentob greenlit the special with a delivery date of 27 November. Budget issues continued to plague the production, and on 9 July, The Dark Dimension was cancelled for "financial and logistical reasons". Philip Segal claimed responsibility for the cancellation, as he wanted to avoid drawing attention from the new Doctor Who television series pilot he was developing in the United States (this manifested in 1996 as Doctor Who: The Movie), though this narrative has been debunked by researcher Richard Bignell.

=== Writing ===
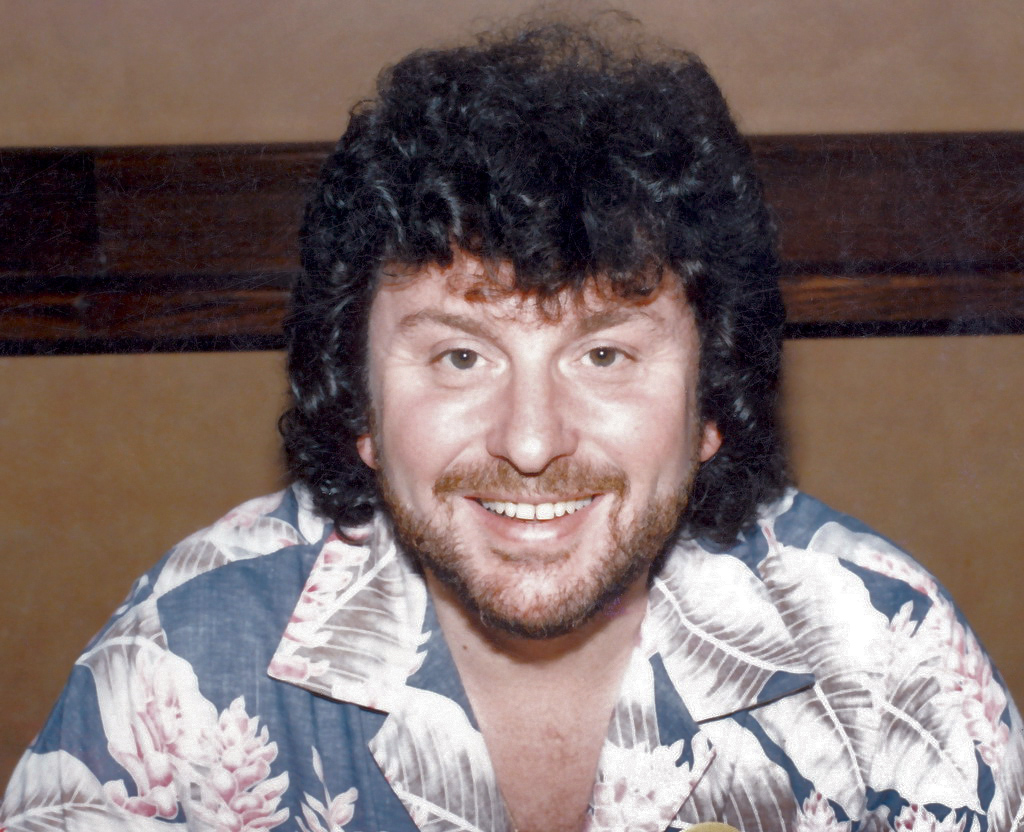
John Nathan-Turner co-wrote and produced the charity special.

In May 1993, Children in Need editor Nick Handel invited Nathan-Turner to make a five-minute 3D Doctor Who sketch for the organisation's annual telethon broadcast. Nathan-Turner thought of turning down the offer but was persuaded by his agent to make the sketch his "swansong", since he did not have the chance to leave Doctor Who on his own terms in 1989. Nathan-Turner sought a "talented, yet relatively inexperienced co-writer" who could enthusiastically adapt to the myriad of requests typical of Children in Need productions. He approached David Roden, a 22-year-old aspiring writer with no professional experience, with an open brief to write the charity special. Roden's initial concept, Destination: Holocaust, which involved the Seventh Doctor and Brigadier Lethbridge-Stewart battling Cybermen in a church, was considered too expensive for the allocated budget. Nathan-Turner wanted a more nostalgic feel for the special, and also wanted to involve multiple monsters to make use of existing costumes. Another low-cost concept was set entirely in the TARDIS featuring the Seventh Doctor and Ace facing an alien which fed off nightmares. One underdeveloped story idea involved Easter Island heads.

It was originally thought that only the Seventh Doctor would appear, but in recognition of the upcoming 30th anniversary, Nathan-Turner and Handel decided to involve as many of the Doctor's incarnations as possible. Doctor Who traditionally celebrated its past anniversaries with "multi-Doctor" stories; The Three Doctors (1972–1973) and "The Five Doctors" (1983) featured past incarnations of the Doctor interacting with the incumbent incarnation. Roden was also requested to involve as many companions and monsters from the series as possible. Per Nicholas Courtney's request, the Brigadier was depicted interacting with the Sixth Doctor, as Colin Baker was the only Doctor Who lead Courtney hadn't shared a scene with on the series. Nathan-Turner wanted to call the special 3-Dimensions of Time; Roden changed it to The Dimensions of Time. It was retitled Dimensions in Time when it was discovered that "The Dimensions of Time" was an episode from the 1965 serial The Space Museum.

I'm incredibly proud of having been involved with it. I'm also deeply embarrassed by the end result. I mean, it is just a mess.

— screenwriter David Roden on Dimensions in Time in 2015

In a 2015 interview, Roden discussed the difficulty of shouldering the numerous requests made on the script, stating that he felt "heavily pressured" by Nathan-Turner's demands and describing the completed special as a "mess". Anthony Ainley declined an offer to return as the Master, possibly due to a personal clash with Nathan-Turner. In his stead, Kate O'Mara agreed to return as the Rani, the ruthless villain she portrayed in The Mark of the Rani (1985) and Time and the Rani (1987). The production team behind light entertainment show Noel's House Party wanted to be involved with Children in Need, so Dimensions in Time gained another episode which could be shown during that programme.

Nathan-Turner suggested that the special could crossover with popular BBC soap opera EastEnders to satisfy Handel's request to guarantee press attention. This could also save budget by enabling the production to film on the existing Albert Square set. EastEnders producer Leonard Lewis was not amenable to the idea as the filming would disrupt his production schedule. He allowed Nathan-Turner only one day to film at Albert Square, which was not enough time due to the complicated nature of filming in 3D. Major rewrites were in order. Roden devised a new script, titled The Endgame, involving the Celestial Toymaker in an amusement park. Roden recently acted in Wittgenstein (1993) with Michael Gough, who played the Toymaker in the 1966 serial, and he felt he could persuade Gough to reprise the role. Roden suggested that the Toymaker could facilitate a multi-Doctor storyline by plucking the various Doctors from their timestreams, but there were concerns it would be too similar to "The Five Doctors". According to Roden, Gough at first agreed to return but later declined, either due to unavailability or disinterest in the script. The Endgame was ultimately scrapped and development returned to Dimensions in Time.

Handel suggested that the sketch could be shot for 3D viewing, as Children in Need wanted to feature prominently in BBC1's planned "3D week". The script was rewritten to include more action and movement to fully exploit the 3D Pulfrich effect, following a review by 3D experts from Germany. An opening scene where the Rani's assistant captures a wounded Cyberman was cut in the revised 1 August script. Tom Baker was originally scripted to appear in Albert Square similarly to the other Doctors, however he wanted his part in the script to be more unique. Ten years earlier he pulled out of the multi-Doctor special "The Five Doctors" over his displeasure in "playing 20 per cent of the part [of the Doctor]". He suggested he could introduce the story by doing a piece to camera. Nathan-Turner and Roden adapted the idea into an opening scene where the Fourth Doctor is trapped in a black hole and calling on the Time Lords for help. The day before filming, Tom Baker was still unhappy with the script, necessitating Roden to hastily rewrite the Fourth Doctor's monologue.

=== Casting ===
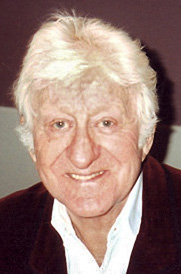
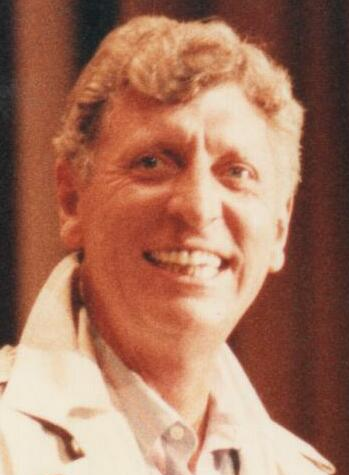
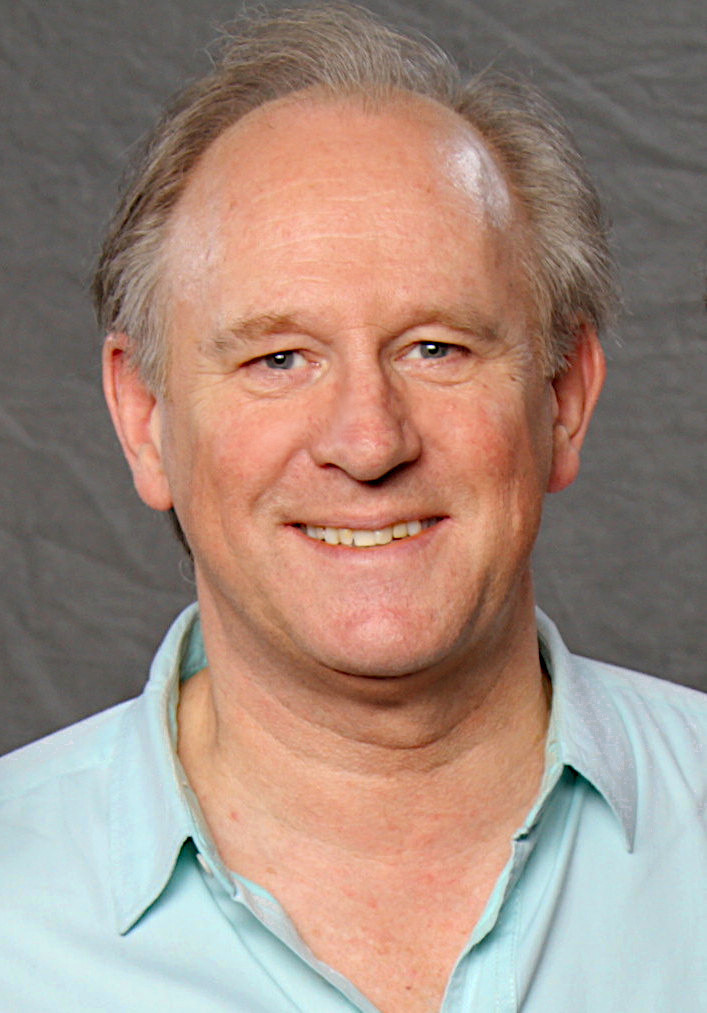
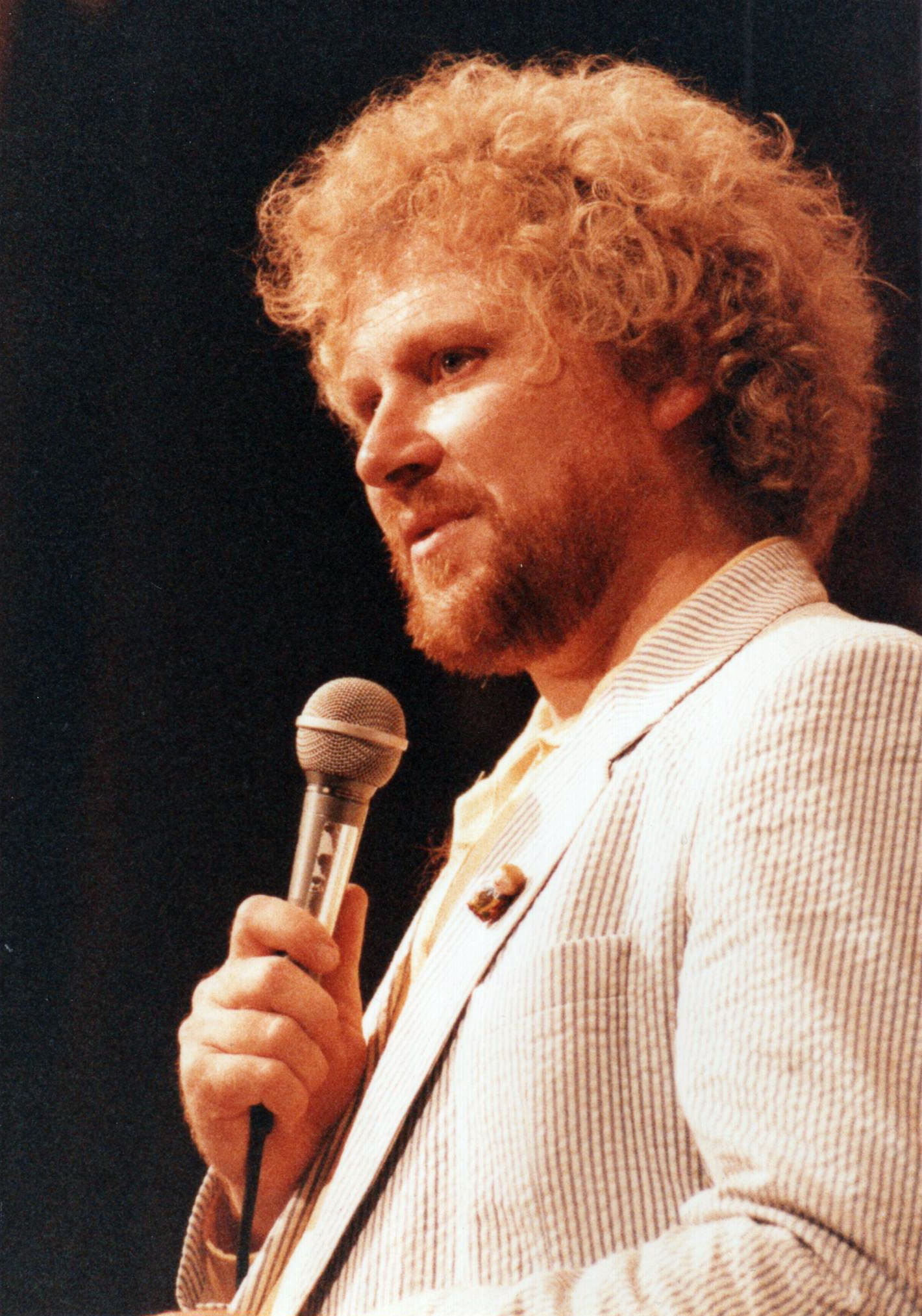
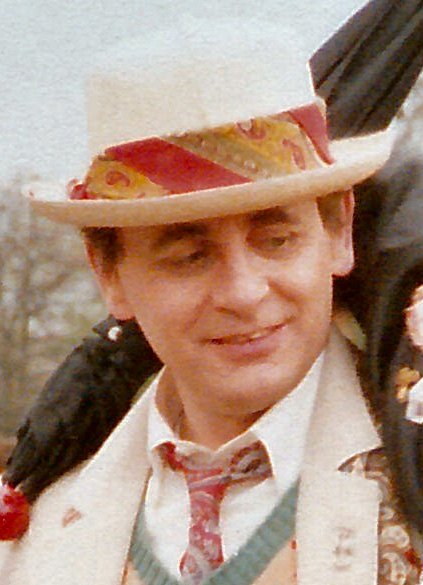
The five surviving actors who led Doctor Who appeared in the special. Top: Jon Pertwee, Tom Baker, Peter Davison. Bottom: Colin Baker, Sylvester McCoy

Handel was cognisant that a Doctor Who/EastEnders crossover would be a highlight of Children in Need's telethon, and he pushed the two production teams to compromise on a deal. Nathan-Turner phoned actress Wendy Richard and pitched her the idea of playing her character Pauline Fowler at different ages; Richard agreed and soon fellow actresses Letitia Dean and Gillian Taylforth were keen to be involved. Pam St Clement, Mike Reid, Ross Kemp and Steve McFadden were also interested in the crossover and written into the script. Ultimately the EastEnders production team allowed Dimensions in Time two days to film on Albert Square: 22 and 23 September.

The revised script on 8 September noted on its cover: "Due to the large number of artists involved in this project, and their availability, this script is subject to change". For this reason, scenes were scripted so that the Doctors and companions would be interchangeable. 32 of the 34 actors involved had other acting jobs during filming. Per a deal between the BBC and Equity, the cast (and crew) were unpaid on the condition that their work would never be re-broadcast or commercially exploited.

Dimensions in Time features all five of the surviving actors who led Doctor Who, in addition to several actors who played companions or supporting characters. This was the first time that Tom Baker, Peter Davison and Colin Baker portrayed the Doctor in a televised episode since leaving the series. However as pre-production began, not every actor was available for filming. McCoy and Davison had prior commitments, and Tom Baker was hesitant to be involved as he disliked the script. It was suggested that any actors' absence could be explained by having them be captured in the Rani's time tunnel. Davison became available shortly before filming, and McCoy's scenes were moved to Greenwich to accommodate his schedule.

Several companion actors were unable to appear. Katy Manning was overseas during filming, and Mary Tamm and Frazer Hines were busy acting in other programmes. Carole Ann Ford replaced Hines with only one day's notice. Janet Fielding agreed to appear but later declined as she felt uncomfortable returning to acting after three years. Ian McKellen turned down the role of the Rani's assistant. Samuel West, a long-time fan of Doctor Who, was ultimately cast in the role, named Cyrian ("Sir Ian"). Adam Woodyatt, a huge Doctor Who fan, was disappointed that his studio schedule meant he was unable to appear as his EastEnders character Ian Beale. Nevertheless he made a brief appearance as a nonspeaking background extra in the shot of the Mitchell brothers crossing the playground.

=== Filming ===
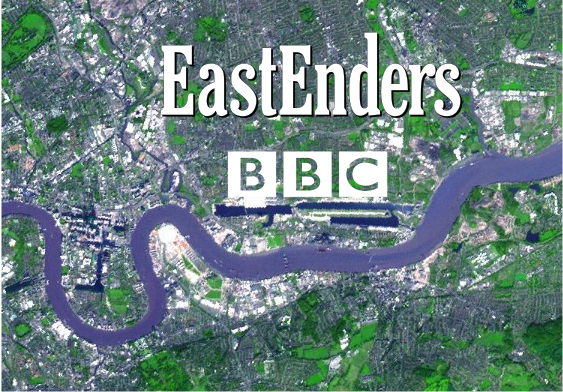
Dimensions in Time shot on EastEnders's Albert Square set in September 1993.

With a budget of £45,000, filming began on 21 September at Fountain TV Studios in New Malden. The Rani and Cyrian's scenes were filmed first, with the Fourth Doctor's lone scene recorded after noon. It was planned for the Rani's TARDIS set to be constructed in miniature, with Kate O'Mara and the console composited via CSO, but since the 3D filming process made compositing too difficult, a replica of the TARDIS set constructed for PanoptiCon '93 was used. The console was newly cast in black fibreglass from the original 1983 console moulds.

Filming with Tom Baker had its challenges. Nathan-Turner was aware that Tom Baker would likely refuse to wear his Fourth Doctor costume if asked directly, and surreptitiously arranged for the costume to be left in the actor's dressing room as they were talking. On set, Tom Baker suggested that, at the conclusion of his scene, the Fourth Doctor could scream and turn to reveal a bullet hole in his face. Nathan-Turner was not pleased with the idea and, as a compromise, a question mark bruise was added to his right cheek. Baker revised his lines during filming and elected to speak into a microphone rather than at the camera. The day concluded with visual effects artist Mike Tucker recording explosion assets.

22 and 23 September were spent filming on the Albert Square set in Elstree. Small charges were let off in front of the camera as part of the "time jump" effect. Colin Baker's scenes were shot first, followed by Davison's scenes. Andrew Beech, former coordinator of the Doctor Who Appreciation Society, assembled fans who owned original and replica monster costumes to play the Rani's alien menagerie. These fans wore the costumes themselves and gave their time for free; Beech himself played the Time Lord on Albert Square and in the Rani's TARDIS. Many of the older original costumes were fragile and needed maintenance throughout filming. A Dalek prop was filmed at Albert Square as part of the menagerie, but this was removed from the edit as Roger Hancock (Terry Nation's agent) did not allow the production to use the Daleks. Pertwee began filming his scenes in the afternoon. According to Roden, Pertwee complained that he did not understand the plot and thus read his lines off of boards. Filming on 23 September began with Romana being dragged into the Queen Vic. Lalla Ward, McFadden and Kemp similarly protested that they did not understand the plot. Pertwee was the only Doctor on set this day.

The final day of exterior filming, 24 September, took place in Greenwich. On-set footage was recorded by crew from Tomorrow's World. Filming began at Cutty Sark at 8:30am with the Seventh Doctor and Ace arriving in the TARDIS. McCoy was exhausted after performing in a recently-opened production of The Invisible Man at Churchill Theatre in Bromley. According to Louise Jameson, McCoy arrived to filming slightly late and slightly hung over, only to find that, in his absence, the other Doctors had reassigned many of their technobabble lines to him. McCoy recalled The Dark Dimension's cancellation by declaring "I don't understand why those BBC Enterprises people can't get us all together for love nor money, but when JN-T makes a few calls, we're all here with our boots blacked – doing it for nothing!" Pertwee and Deborah Watling's scene on Cutty Sark was delayed due to a fire. Watling wore a long cloak to hide that her arm was in plaster - she had broken it a few days earlier using her nephew's rollerblades. Afterwards the crew moved to the Royal Naval College. Lt Commander Malcolm Fewtrell granted the production permission to film in the high security area in exchange for a signed photograph of Kate O'Mara. This is where the scenes featuring the Brigadier and the UNIT helicopter were recorded. Although Pertwee wanted to jump aboard the helicopter himself, Nathan-Turner refused; Pertwee's regular Doctor Who stunt double Terry Walsh performed the stunt. Courtney, still in his Brigadier costume, had lunch with Roden at a nearby pub and was recognised by the bartender.

The final scenes of the special were filmed at the National Maritime Museum, Queen's House and the Royal Observatory. Jameson insisted she would not wear her original Leela costume, so with little time to plan, costume designer Ken Trew hired a Native American outfit. The last scene filmed was also the chronologically last scene of the special with the Seventh Doctor, Ace and K9. The sixteen-year-old K9 prop broke during filming and had to be pulled through the shot on fishing line.

Special effects model filming ran from 25 to 27 September at Television Centre, London. This included the Rani's space station, the futuristic 2013 train and the First and Second Doctor's floating heads. The original plan was for the floating heads to be depicted via existing footage of William Hartnell and Patrick Troughton, both of whom had died years before the sketch. However those 2D clips would not easily composite into the newly-shot 3D footage, so head props were specially sculpted by Sue Moore and Steve Mansfield (who previously created Kane's melting head in the 1987 serial Dragonfire) with wigs by Lesley Smith. The space station exterior of the Rani's TARDIS was depicted with a model adapted from BBV's The Stranger series. Because the monolith prop (the Rani's TARDIS in disguise) was constructed only a day before filming, Tucker had a single day to construct a miniature version for filming on 26 September. The background to the Fourth Doctor's scene was composed of elements taken from a 3D test tape received from Germany. A scene where the Doctor's TARDIS is caught in an asteroid field was filmed but cut.

=== Post-production ===
Keff McCulloch, who scored various Doctor Who serials in the late 1980s, composed about eight minutes of incidental music for the special.

Roden suggested that the musical duo Pet Shop Boys, with whom he was friends, could produce a new arrangement of the Doctor Who theme music, but they were too busy. Nathan-Turner and Roden subsequently approached the pop duo Erasure, not realising that they were on tour and were not receiving their messages. Erasure eventually agreed, by which time Nathan-Turner had agreed to use an arrangement by music group Cybertech (Mike Fillis and Adrian Pack). Fillis, who played a Sea Devil in the special, approached Nathan Turner during filming at Albert Square with the remix on a cassette tape. The remix was commercially released in 1994.

== Continuity ==
Dimensions in Time is generally not considered "canon" to Doctor Who continuity. In 1994, Nathan-Turner stated that Dimensions in Time "was never intended to be part of the Doctor Who mythos". Roden reiterated in 2015 that the special "was not made to be canon". Shortly after its release, Doctor Who Magazine deemed the special to be non-canonical. In Doctor Who: The Complete History, John Ainsworth argued there is no reason to ignore Dimensions in Time from the series' official chronology, noting that "the original actors reprised their parts. It featured a previously established villain... It's not a spoof – it's played completely straight". He suggested the negative reaction to the special has affected its status in Doctor Who canon.

Establishing EastEnders and Doctor Who in the same shared universe creates various continuity problems. Both Pauline Fowler and Kathy Beale were killed off in EastEnders prior to 2013, but Dimensions in Time depicts them as existing in that year alive and well. Sophie Aldred appeared in two 1993 episodes of the soap opera, and Louise Jameson and Bonnie Langford later appeared as regular characters. The 2006 Doctor Who episode "Army of Ghosts" depicts EastEnders as a TV series which exists within the Doctor Who universe.

== Broadcast ==
Episode	Title	Run time	Original release date	UK viewers (millions)
1	"Part One"	7:38	26 November 1993	13.8
2	"Part Two"	5:28	27 November 1993	13.6

The 18 November issue of Radio Times featured the Doctors on its cover and came with a free pair of 3D glasses. Part One was introduced by Noel Edmonds in a live sketch with Pertwee in character as the Third Doctor. After Part One aired, a telephone vote was held to choose which EastEnders character—Mandy Salter (Nicola Stapleton) or Big Ron (Ron Tarr)—would assist the Doctor in Part Two (two versions of the same scene were filmed). The voting gimmick was conceived by Michael Leggo, producer of Edmonds' show Noel's House Party. Although the version with Big Ron was expected to be broadcast, the Mandy version won out with 22,484 votes (56%) compared to 17,044 votes (44%). These phone votes raised £101,000. Part Two was introduced by Edmonds during Noel's House Party.

Dimensions in Time achieved UK viewing figures of 13.8 million and 13.6 million viewers for the first and second parts respectively, the highest for Doctor Who since Part Four of City of Death (1979) at 16.1 million viewers. (Note: City of Death's broadcast coincided with industrial action at ITV.) That same weekend, Nathan-Turner screened the special at Visions in Chicago with Children in Need's permission, raising $6,000 from sales of 3D glasses.

Dimensions in Time has never been rebroadcast, per the deal between the BBC and Equity. Programme documents read "N.B. This material can never be used on air again". However, researcher Richard Bignell stated a commercial release is unlikely moreso due to the high cost of licensing material owned by Children in Need. A short clip of Kate O'Mara as the Rani from Dimensions in Time was used in the 2025 Doctor Who episode Wish World.

== Reception ==
I don't need to defend Dimensions in Time – it should be taken for what it is: a jolly romp to celebrate Doctor Who's thirtieth birthday. If you didn't like it, fine; if you did like it, that's equally fine. But if you can honestly say that the 30th anniversary of Doctor Who would have been better without it, without its publicity, without its Radio Times front cover, without its colossal audience figure, without its individual effect on the final amount of money raised for such a worthy charity, then I feel sorry for you.

— producer John Nathan-Turner in 1994

Contemporary fan reception was extremely negative. A few months after the special's release, the regular gag cartoon of Doctor Who Magazine, Doctor Who?, sardonically depicted "Unlikely things to hear whilst viewing the 'Dimensions in Time' story" ("These 3D effects are really convincing!", "They must have spent a fortune on this!", "Albert Square is a very effective setting"). In The Discontinuity Guide (1995), Paul Cornell, Martin Day and Keith Topping called it "nostalgic and camp, amusing nonsense". In the licensed reference book series Doctor Who: The Handbook, David J. Howe, Mark Stammers and Stephen James Walker gave the special a 0/10 and called it "a dreadful travesty of a Doctor Who story" despite its charitable aims. Howe and Walker also criticised the plot and pacing, calling it "Doctor Who on acid" and comparing it to a sketch from The Benny Hill Show.

Nicholas Briggs, who later voiced the Daleks in Doctor Who's revived series, criticised the special's production value and plot. However he suggested that it received an unfairly high level of scrutiny because of the absence of original Doctor Who programming on television. He also suggested that the special is more accurately compared to an advert or comedy sketch rather than a standard serial.

In 2013, Oli Smith of IGN likened Dimensions in Time to the similarly maligned Star Wars Holiday Special, remarking that it "ditched the whole idea of a plot altogether". In 2016, Entertainment Weekly called it a "train wreck" and lamented "what could have been a spectacular event ended up being an embarrassing hodgepodge", criticising the special effects, plot and EastEnders cameos. Writing for Radio Times in 2023, Patrick Mulkern called it "diabolical – the best that can be said is that it was mounted in a charitable cause".
