= Gita Kapoor =

Fictional character from the BBC soap opera EastEnders

- EastEnders character
- Portrayed by: Shobu Kapoor
- Duration: 1993–1998
- First appearance: Episode 840; 18 February 1993
- Last appearance: Episode 1673; 24 September 1998
- Introduced by: Leonard Lewis
- Spin-off appearances: Dimensions in Time (1993)
In-universe information
- Occupation: Market trader
- Sisters: Meena McKenzie
- Husband: Sanjay Kapoor
- Sons: Arjun Kapoor
- Daughters: Sharmilla Kapoor

Gita Kapoor is a fictional character from the BBC soap opera EastEnders, played by Shobu Kapoor, from 18 February 1993 to 24 September 1998. Gita has a fierce temper, which she uses to keep her troublesome husband in check.

== Creation and development ==
Gita played by Shobu Kapoor and her husband Sanjay (Deepak Verma) were introduced early in 1993 by producer Leonard Lewis. They were the first characters of Asian descent to be introduced since the Karim family, who departed from the serial in 1990. The Kapoors were the programme's first attempt to portray non-Muslim Asian characters; the Kapoors were practicing Hindus, descending from India.

Shobu Kapoor auditioned for the role of Gita along with actress Nina Wadia. Both had been working together on a play prior to auditioning, and neither knew that the other would be attending the audition until they bumped into each other at the casting call. It was Kapoor who was offered the part; Wadia would later go on to play another character years later, Zainab Masood.

In 1998, EastEnders acquired a new executive producer, Matthew Robinson. Robinson was dubbed "the axeman" in the British press, after a large proportion of the EastEnders cast either quit, or were culled, shortly after Robinson's introduction. It was reported that Robinson hoped the changes would attract more viewers and "spice up [the soap's fictional setting of] Walford".

Among the departing characters were long-running Asian family the Kapoors, including Sanjay, Gita and Neelam Kapoor (Jamila Massey). As they were the only Asian characters in the show, EastEnders received criticism for axing them from angry black and Asian MPs, including Oona King, MP for East End constituency Bethnal Green and Dr Ashok Kumar.

== Storylines ==
Gita is married to Sanjay (Deepak Verma) and she is first seen in Albert Square in February 1993. Gita's husband had been left a clothing business by his parents when they moved to India. However Sanjay had proven himself to be a poor businessman and after some bad monetary investments, his business had gone bankrupt. Gita, who is heavily pregnant, has been forced to live with her sister, Meena (Sudha Bhuchar), while Sanjay desperately tries to find them a place to live. Sanjay comes to the Square to ask his friend, Richard Cole (Ian Reddington), to give him a permanent pitch on the market that he runs. Sanjay was a compulsive gambler, and he gambles away the deposit for a flat they intended to buy, so Gita is forced to move in with Richard. After more gambling, Sanjay finally managed to secure the funds for a flat at 43B Albert Square. That same day, Gita goes into labour and typically, Sanjay is nowhere to be seen. She ends up giving birth to a girl, Sharmilla (Priya Bilkhu), with Richard holding her hand through the ordeal.

Gita finds parenthood quite stressful at first. Sanjay is no help whatsoever and so her snooty sister, Meena, decides to come and stay with the Kapoors for a while, under the pretence she is there to help. Actually, she has fallen out with her husband, Jerry McKenzie (Brian Capron), and she needs somewhere to stay. Meena is a snob, she has married into money and deems herself better in every way to her sister. Meena and Sanjay had never got along and she always ends up causing problems whenever she is around. Gita begins to suffer from post-natal depression and starts to think Sanjay is having an affair. After seeing him and Michelle Fowler (Susan Tully) liaising together, she begins to think that she is the other woman. Furious, Gita confronts Michelle in The Queen Victoria public house, but Meena rushes to Sanjay's defence and eventually convinces Gita that Sanjay is not capable of committing adultery. Feeling embarrassed by her outburst, Gita decides she needed a break from Walford, so at the end of the year she leaves Sharmilla in Sanjay's care and goes to stay with a relative.

In January 1994, Gita arrives home early from her vacation. As she creeps into her flat she is shocked to see Sanjay and Meena lying naked and asleep, in her bed. Gita suddenly realises that Meena is the 'other woman'. Gita disowns her sister, and throws Sanjay out. She then sets about trying to get revenge by refusing Sanjay access to both the market stall and Sharmilla, informing Meena's husband, Jerry, about the affair. A furious Jerry confronts Sanjay, and he admits that the affair has been going on for months, at least 3 or 4 nights a week. A furious Gita then decides to leave Walford with Sharmilla, without telling Sanjay where she is going. Months later, when she has run out of money, she returns to Albert Square and forces Sanjay out of their flat again. She and Sanjay share the stall work and care of Sharmilla, and this leads Sanjay to think that he and Gita will be back together soon. However, Gita remains wary, and with Meena still visiting Gita in an effort to reconcile with her, a reconciliation does not materialise. Later that year she becomes the target of racist attacks and so she begrudgingly begins to lean on Sanjay for assistance. Eventually he catches a bunch of yobs in the act and is just shoving one to the ground when a police car pulls up and Sanjay is arrested. He is released with a caution, and Sanjay and Gita reconcile on Christmas Day and spend the night together. Gita is quick to remind Sanjay that their night of passion was just about sex, but during 1995 they continue to meet regularly for sex. Eventually Gita agrees to give their marriage another try and let him move back in.

In September of that year, Sanjay is forced to return to India to tend to his dying grandfather. This leaves Gita to run the stall as she sees fit. She is soon approached by smooth talking businessman Guppy Sharma (Lyndam Gregory), and after many dinner dates (allegedly to discuss business), Gita becomes close to him. However it is revealed that Meena has split from Jerry and Guppy is her new fiancé. Gita then wants nothing more to do with Guppy, but upon Sanjay's return he is persuaded to invest in one of Guppy's dodgy deals. However, Guppy is a conman, and after Sanjay gives him the investment money, he disappears, leaving Sanjay to face huge debts, and Gita is furious. In 1996 Sanjay and Gita decide to try for another baby. When Gita fails to conceive, they consult doctors, and Sanjay is diagnosed with a low sperm count. Sanjay is devastated by this news, as he feels it compromises his masculinity. Gita assures him that it does not matter and that she will always love him. Sanjay's mother, Neelam (Jamila Massey), comes over from India to live with them later that year. Gita and Neelam regularly clash, and Neelam often makes it clear that Gita is not good enough for her son. After much sniping Gita can finally take no more and in October 1997, she announces she is taking Sharmilla away to visit her sister for a while.

In January 1998 Gita and Sharmilla are due to arrive home, but Sanjay is late to meet them at the train station. When he finally arrives, they are nowhere to be seen. Sanjay had planned to collect them from the station, but after getting involved in yet another dodgy business deal, he is late for their rendezvous. When he arrives Gita is nowhere to be seen. When there is still no sign of them days later, Sanjay is forced to contact the police. Months pass but there is still no word from Gita and evidence leads the police to think that Sanjay may have been responsible for her disappearance. He is then arrested and accused of her murder, although he is later released without charge. Everyone comes to assume that Gita and Sharmilla are dead. However, in July that year, Gita contacts her friend, Ruth Fowler (Caroline Paterson), and tells her that she is living in Birmingham and is in desperate need of some money. She makes Ruth promise not to tell Sanjay, but he finds out, and he and Ruth go to Birmingham to track her down. After much searching they trace Gita to a hospital, and are shocked to discover Gita with a new born baby boy. She divulges that she had become pregnant after a one-night stand and instead of returning to face Sanjay, she had run away. The father had since abandoned her and now she is all alone. Sanjay is furious, but after much soul-searching he decides that he can be a loving father to her new child, Arjun, and he eventually decides to give their relationship another go. The family are happy for a short while, until the local reporter, Polly Becker (Victoria Gould), discovers their recent scandal. After secretly taping confessions from Sanjay and Ruth, she gets their shocking story published in the Walford Gazette. Suddenly all of Walford know what had transpired in Gita's absence. From then on, Sanjay and Gita are hounded by reporters and Sharmilla is bullied at school. The Kapoors decide that their only option is to leave Walford. Their last appearance was in September 1998.

In 2024, Gita is mentioned in conversation by her former best friend Cindy Beale (Michelle Collins) to her partner Ian Beale (Adam Woodyatt) when she claims that she has been in touch with Gita and they are meeting up; however, this is a cover as Cindy is continuing the next episode of her affair with Junior Knight (Micah Balfour). In February 2025, Cindy leaves Walford to stay with Gita.

== Reception ==
In 2020, Sara Wallis and Ian Hyland from The Daily Mirror placed Gita 75th on their ranked list of the best EastEnders characters of all time, writing that she had an "explosive temper" and calling her marriage to Sanjay "rocky", and said that her big stories included her postnatal depression and racist attacks.

== In popular culture ==
In 2007, the character was referenced in an episode of British comedy television show, Gavin & Stacey.
