= List of EastEnders characters introduced in 1995 =

EastEnders logo

The following is a list of characters that first appeared in the BBC soap opera EastEnders in 1995, by order of first appearance.

== Tiffany Mitchell ==
Tiffany Mitchell (also Raymond) is played by Martine McCutcheon from 1995 until 1998. The character was created by the writer, Tony Jordan. She is introduced as a school friend of Bianca Jackson (Patsy Palmer) and becomes a prominent and popular character during her tenure due to a combustible relationship with the soap's landlord, Grant Mitchell (Ross Kemp). McCutcheon quit the role in 1998 to pursue a musical career. Introduced in 1995 by series producer Barbara Emile, Tiffany Raymond was conceptualised by EastEnders scriptwriter Tony Jordan as a school friend of already established character, Bianca Jackson. Actress Martine McCutcheon was cast in the role. McCutcheon has revealed that she was initially hesitant about auditioning for the part, commenting to The Guardian, "An agent called me and said there was a part on EastEnders and I said, very offhandedly, 'I don't really want to do soap, because I want to do movies, and nobody I know goes from soap to movies, and it's just not the sort of actress I want to be [...] this agent said to me, just let me send you a synopsis of the character and see what you think, and I thought she was fantastic. And I watched EastEnders that night and I realised just how many people talked about it. So I told my agent, 'All right, I'm going to go for it, I'm not in a position to be fussy".

== Andrea Price ==
Andrea Price
- EastEnders character
- Portrayed by: Cindy O'Callaghan
- Duration: 1995, 1999
- First appearance: Episode 1097; 23 February 1995
- Last appearance: Episode 1888; 31 December 1999
- Introduced by: Barbara Emile (1995); Matt Robinson (1999)
In-universe information
- Occupation: Former singer
- Husband: Dave Price
- Sons: Jack Price; Kevin Price
- Daughters: Natalie Evans; Susie Price
- Grandsons: Darren; Jack Evans

Andrea Price, played by Cindy O'Callaghan, is the mother of Natalie Price (Lucy Speed). During 1994 and 1995 she lives at 87 George Street with Natalie. Although she isn't seen often on screen, she is referred to regularly by her daughter and depicted as the "mother from hell". After Natalie has an affair with Ricky Butcher (Sid Owen) – her best friend, Bianca Jackson (Patsy Palmer)'s boyfriend – Andrea sends her to her sister's in Basingstoke in February 1995 to avoid the wrath of the Jackson family. Sometime later, Andrea also leaves Walford to move near to the rest of the Price family. Natalie had not spoken to her mother for several years before they are reunited in August 1999 by Natalie's meddling fiancé, Barry Evans (Shaun Williamson).

Natalie had always had a tempestuous relationship with her boozy mother. Andrea favoured her eldest daughter Susie (Viva Duce) and would constantly make it clear that Natalie wasn't good enough. Things have not improved in the time since they have been apart, and upon Natalie's arrival Andrea gets extremely drunk and proceeds to embarrass and humiliate her in front of Barry. She picks holes in her appearance, brands her a waste of space, and blames her for her own fleeting looks, her failure to make it as a singer and even for the break-up of her marriage to Natalie's father. Upon witnessing Andrea's true colours and seeing how upset she made Natalie, Barry prohibits her from having any part in their lives.

However, in November of that year, Andrea turns up on Natalie's doorstep. She has won some money playing bingo and wants to help pay for Natalie's wedding. Natalie is opposed to the idea, but she is struggling to fund the wedding so she begrudgingly accepts. Andrea proceeds to take over the whole organisation of the wedding, concocting themes and colour codes, which only infuriates an already stressed Natalie. Andrea manages to offend Natalie's future father-in-law, Roy Evans (Tony Caunter), by goading him for not paying anything towards the wedding, which causes a huge row between Andrea and Roy's wife, Pat Evans (Pam St. Clement), who is already offended after Andrea tells her that she has bad taste.

On Natalie's joint hen night with Mel Healy (Tamzin Outhwaite) in Amsterdam, Andrea, true to form, gets extremely drunk and delights in making a fool of her daughter yet again. After chatting Barry up (who is also there on his stag night) and cruelly telling Natalie that he is having second thoughts, she proceeds to kiss him right in front of her. Natalie is devastated, but the final straw comes when she discovers that her mother has arranged an Adam and Eve themed wedding, in which she begins to believe they are "The Adam and Eve of the New Millennium". Horrified, Natalie calls off the wedding, after which Barry banishes Andrea from their lives for a second time, bribing her with money only for Andrea to shout at her daughter "I hope you and your Garden of Eden are happy!". Natalie and Barry manage to patch things up and marry on New Year's Eve. Andrea attends, but despite her best efforts, she is restrained from having anything to do with the wedding.

Andrea Price was the second role that Cindy O'Callaghan played in EastEnders, having previously played Stella, the mistress of Ashraf Karim (Aftab Sachak), from 1989 to 1990.

== Lydia ==
Lydia
- EastEnders character
- Portrayed by: Marlaine Gordon
- Duration: 1995–1996
- First appearance: Episode 1108; 21 March 1995
- Last appearance: Episode 1249; 12 February 1996
In-universe information
- Occupation: Market trader

Lydia, played by Marlaine Gordon, is a recurring character appearing between 1995 and 1996. Lydia is first seen in Walford in March 1995, when she is hired as an apprentice hairdresser by Della Alexander (Michelle Joseph). She is a bit obnoxious and likes to gossip, and she often ends up infuriating her employer, particularly as she is often the topic of the gossip. Lydia loses her job in May that year when Della decides to move away from Walford. Audacious Lydia spends the last few days of her employment badmouthing Della to anyone who will listen and boasting about a new job she is applying for in an upper class salon. She then gives Della her reference to sign, which describes her as popular, bubbly and humorous. Della has the last laugh however, when she re-writes the reference depicting her as obnoxious and useless. A furious Lydia then leaves, uttering a tirade of homophobic abuse at her lesbian employer as she goes.

Later in the year Lydia comes back to Walford to apply for a job at Ian Beale (Adam Woodyatt)'s chip shop. She is rejected after a disastrous interview, but manages to get herself a job working on Sanjay (Deepak Verma) and Gita Kapoor (Shobu Kapoor)'s market stall instead. She soon starts dating the philandering chef Steve Elliot (Mark Monero). Steve, who has always run a mile from commitment in the past, seems quite taken with Lydia, and in 1996, the two move into a flat together. In February, Steve gets into trouble with a criminal firm, who refuse to allow him to testify at a trial, which they fear will place them under a police investigation. After several threats Steve decides not to testify, but this earns the scorn of Lydia and she manages to persuade him to go through with it. To change his mind the firm kidnapped Lydia. Steve is frantic, but he eventually finds a distraught Lydia, who informs him that the mobsters have attempted to drown her and threatened to kill her if he doesn't back out of testifying. Fearful for his girlfriend's life, Steve packs his things and both he and Lydia leave Walford later that night. Their last appearance is in February 1996.

== Willy Roper ==
Willy Roper, played by Michael Tudor Barnes, was introduced to EastEnders on 1 June 1995, and departed on 20 June 1996. He was a villainous character, and was later dubbed "Wicked Willy" by the British press after he framed Arthur Fowler (Bill Treacher) for embezzlement, leading to Arthur being falsely imprisoned. The truth was later uncovered by Arthur's wife Pauline (Wendy Richard), though it was too late for Arthur – he died shortly after his release due a head injury he sustained in a prison riot.

== Ted Hills ==
Ted Hills, played by Brian Croucher, is introduced in 1995 as the patriarch of the Hills family, who are the extended family of established character Kathy Beale (Gillian Taylforth). Ted was axed in 1997. Brian Croucher was selected to play Ted Hills after auditioning for the part of Roy Evans in 1994. Croucher was short-listed to play Roy, a love interest for Pat Butcher (Pam St Clement), but the show ultimately decided they did not want to use him for Roy and instead cast him as Ted Hills, the older brother of original character Kathy Beale. Ted is the patriarch of a family of three introduced in 1995. In his storyline, Ted moves back to Walford, the area he was born and raised in, with his son Tony Hills (Mark Homer) and daughter Sarah Hills (Daniela Denby-Ashe). In 1997, Brian Croucher was axed from the show. It was reported that his character Ted would "go out with a bang". A source said, "Brian was near the end of his contract and it was an opportunity to create a classic EastEnders moment."

== Tony Hills ==
Tony Hills, played by Mark Homer, is first shown on screen on 7 September 1995 after arriving from Norfolk with his sister, Sarah Hills (Daniella Denby-Ashe). At first, he is painted as an unsympathetic character; at one point he sells ecstasy with a friend, Dan Zappieri. Eventually, he quits dealing after Dan gives Sarah ecstasy without her knowledge. Homer's departure from EastEnders was announced in late 1998, along with that of his co-star Andrew Lynford. They both decided to leave following discussions with the executive producer Matthew Robinson, and a spokesperson for the programme said "They have mutually agreed that both characters have fulfilled their potential and will conclude their stories with a dramatic exit." Their departures left only one gay character in the UK's mainstream soap operas, that of Zoe Tate (Leah Bracknell) in Emmerdale. Gay campaigning group Stonewall's spokesman Matt Aston commented on this, saying: "Gay characters did seem to be on the rise for a while, but now they've got a bit of a low profile. We'd like to see a few more positive role models in the media, especially to encourage young people who are coming to terms with their sexuality, as well as their friends and members of their family." However, Aston praised the way Tony's sexuality was handled, saying, "It was very good for breaking what had been a taboo on prime-time television. It was a positive portrayal of how people can be confused about their sexuality. And as with any kind of exposure of these issues, people are made more aware of them and the problems people have with their sexuality. People also link them with us and get in touch to talk about it." EastEnders's first gay kiss attracted criticism, but it was noted that by the time Tony and Simon had their first kiss, "fewer feathers were left to be ruffled."

== Sarah Hills ==
Sarah Hills
- EastEnders character
- Portrayed by: Daniela Denby-Ashe
- Duration: 1995–1999
- First appearance: Episode 1181; 7 September 1995
- Last appearance: Episode 1846; 8 October 1999
In-universe information
- Occupation: Student
- Father: Ted Hills
- Mother: Irene Raymond
- Stepfather: Terry Raymond
- Brothers: Tony Hills
- Aunts: Kathy Beale
- First cousins: Ian Beale; Ben Mitchell; Donna Ludlow; Nina Harris

Sarah Hills, played by Daniela Denby-Ashe, appears between 1995 and 1999. Sarah is the daughter of Irene (Roberta Taylor) and Ted Hills (Brian Croucher). Sarah arrives on Albert Square with her dad Ted and brother Tony Hills (Mark Homer). Over a dinner party with her family, Ted is forced to admit that his business is in trouble when a boy was killed after falling off scaffolding and the boy's family was harassing them. Sarah is also rather troublesome shoplifting from various market stalls. This is noticed by Alistair Matthews (Neil Clark), a shop manager and religious cult leader who makes Sarah turn to religion to avoid being turned in to the police. Sarah finds God and becomes friends with local vicar Alex Healy (Richard Driscoll). She has sex with Robbie Jackson (Dean Gaffney) but is ashamed of what she has done and runs away to live rough on the streets. The fallout results in Ricky Butcher (Sid Owen), who finds Sarah in the aftermath, being questioned as a suspect and Sarah's father Ted attacking Robbie accusing him of raping her and landing him in hospital. When she returns home, her dad refuses to believe Robbie didn't rape her and Sarah is shocked to learn what he did to Robbie. Sarah moves in with her aunt, Kathy Mitchell (Gillian Taylforth), Kathy's husband Phil Mitchell (Steve McFadden) and her cousin Ben Mitchell (Matthew Silver). Kathy tries to get Sarah and Ted to make up, but Sarah is disgusted with her dad's violent behaviour. She reports her dad to the police for assaulting Robbie and Ted is arrested. When Sarah and Ted attempt to make amends, things go well until Sarah believes that Ted thinks he did the right thing. She also gets engaged twice, firstly to Joe Wicks (Paul Nicholls) and later to Matthew Rose (Joe Absolom). The former relationship ends when Joe has sex with Mary Flaherty (Melanie Clark Pullen) and the latter ends when Sarah finds out Matthew only wants her for sex. Sarah's last appearance is at Matthew's trial, when he is convicted of the murder of Saskia Duncan (Deborah Sheridan Taylor) in October 1999 – although the real killer is Steve Owen (Martin Kemp). She then leaves Walford to attend university. It has since been mentioned that Sarah reconciled with Joe several years later.

In 2021, Melissa Sigodo from MyLondon called Sarah "troublesome" and opined that the character had a "dramatic exit".

== Guppy Sharma ==
Guppy Sharma
- EastEnders character
- Portrayed by: Lyndam Gregory
- Duration: 1995–1996
- First appearance: Episode 1198; 17 October 1995
- Last appearance: Episode 1272; 4 April 1996
In-universe information
- Occupation: Clothing supplier

Gopal "Guppy" Sharma, played by Lyndam Gregory, is a recurring character appearing between 1995 and 1996. Guppy is first seen in October 1995, approaching market trader Gita Kapoor (Shobu Kapoor) about a business proposition whereby he would supply her with mock designer clothing for her stall at cut price. While Gita's husband Sanjay (Deepak Verma) is out of the country tending to a dying relative, Gita grows close to Guppy; a flirtatious relationship begins.

Gita grows suspicious of Guppy when he is beaten up by his former employer – an owner of a sweatshop – who is angry that Guppy has set up business alone. He refuses to tell Gita who his current business partner is. He pursues Gita, buying her flowers and attempting to kiss her, until he is followed and confronted by his business partner, Gita's sister, Meena McKenzie (Sudha Bhuchar). Gita had disowned her sister 2 years prior for having an affair with her husband, and in an attempt to reconcile with Gita, Meena had persuaded Guppy to offer her cheap business on her behalf. It transpires that Guppy is Meena's fiancé, and Meena grows angry when she discovers that Guppy has been wooing Gita. Arguments between the sisters resurface with Meena refusing to believe that Guppy feels anything for Gita other than pity; she opts to go ahead with her plan to marry Guppy. The Kapoors decide to end their business arrangement with Guppy just as they are noticed selling counterfeit goods by the market inspector, Lesley. Guppy bribes Lesley, but they are witnessed by police and both are arrested. When Guppy reappears, he informs Sanjay that his wedding to Meena never took place. He persuades Sanjay to invest £2,000 in a business venture and then steals his money, leaving Sanjay in debt with a loan shark.

After almost a month of not been heard of or being seen, Guppy suddenly rings Gita out of the blue at the Cafe and arranges to meet her in secret. When Gita meets Guppy with the knowledge of Sanjay, she is shocked at the condition of the accommodation he is now living and the dishevelled state Guppy himself is in. It transpires that Guppy has used the £2000 he stole from Sanjay to pay off some associates. It also appears that Guppy is still holding a torch for Gita and is still hopefully they can get together as a couple. However Gita angrily warns Guppy to stay away from Walford or she cannot account for what Sanjay would do if he came across Guppy again.

== Felix Kawalski ==
Felix Kawalski
- EastEnders character
- Portrayed by: Harry Landis
- Duration: 1995–1997
- First appearance: Episode 1208; 9 November 1995
- Last appearance: Episode 1456; 29 May 1997
In-universe information
- Occupation: Barber
- Sisters: Julia Kawalska
- Nephews: Felix Kawalski
- Nieces: Rivkah Gerson

Felix Kawalski, played by Harry Landis, is a Jewish-Polish immigrant who sets up a barber's shop in Walford. A survivor of the Holocaust, Felix has spent his life searching for his family to no avail. He assumes they had all perished in the Nazi concentration camps, so he is thrilled when he finally makes contact with his surviving sister. Felix is first seen in November 1995 when he moves to Walford to open a barber's shop. He is interested in brass band music, and when he notices Sonia Jackson (Natalie Cassidy) attempting to play the trumpet he tries to offer her the benefit of his wisdom. However, Sonia takes his kind gesture the wrong way and tells her stepfather Alan (Howard Antony). Thinking that Felix is a paedophile, Alan immediately warns him to stay away from Sonia. Intimidated, Felix agrees. Rumours about Felix begin to spread around Walford, leading Sonia and her friend Clare Tyler (Gemma Bissix) to think that he had murdered his wife, cut her to pieces and buried her in the basement of his shop. They are terrified of him, even more so when Clare enters the shop on a dare and notices that he has a cut throat razor. Clare runs away when Felix refuses to tell her what is in his basement, and she immediately assumes his dead wife must have been down there. She, Sonia and Janine Butcher (Alexia Demetriou) steal Felix's keys and sneak into the dark basement where Clare trips and knocks herself out. Panicking, Sonia and Janine run to The Queen Victoria public house and tell Clare's stepfather Nigel Bates (Paul Bradley) that she has been kidnapped. Nigel, Grant (Ross Kemp) and Phil Mitchell (Steve McFadden) find Felix unbuttoning Clare's clothing and immediately suspect the worst. Grant attacks Felix and only stops when Clare tells him that Felix is merely taking care of her, following her fall. As she looks around the cellar, she discovers that all Felix has to hide is a vast collection of butterflies.

The residents all apologise to Felix the next day, and they learn the story behind Felix's collection of butterflies. They learn that Felix is a Polish Jew who had been living in Kraków during World War II when Germany invaded and most Jewish residents were placed in Nazi concentration camps. Felix's father refused to flee Poland, as he would not leave his precious collection of butterflies behind. When the Nazis came to arrest his family, he and his sister hid, but he sneezed, revealing their hiding place. His sister was found but Felix escaped with a small box of butterflies. He travelled from Poland to England, where he was taken in by his uncle. He believed that the rest of his family had perished, and blamed himself for his sister's death. He continued to collect butterflies in his father's honour ever since. Felix befriends the other senior residents of Walford, Jules Tavernier (Tommy Eytle), Ethel Skinner (Gretchen Franklin), Blossom Jackson (Mona Hammond) and Nellie Ellis (Elizabeth Kelly). He and Jules often play chess together in The Queen Victoria pub. Felix is left furious during a chess tournament when Jules keels over while asleep, scattering the chess pieces in the process. Even though Felix does not know where his family are or even if they are still alive, he has spent his life trying to find them. He eventually discovers that his sister has survived and she is living in Israel. After making contact with her, he decides to leave Walford to live there with her. He later returns for a brief visit in May 1997 to tie up some loose ends. On his return, he asks Blossom Jackson to go on holiday to Israel with him, and they depart that month. The hint of romance between Felix and Blossom remains just that, and Blossom returns to England. When Blossom returns for her great grandson Billie's (Devon Anderson) funeral in October 2010, she reveals she and Felix had reconciled but he had died of an illness five years previously.

== Mervyn Dale ==
Mervyn Dale
- EastEnders character
- Portrayed by: Glen Davies
- First appearance: Episode 1218; 4 December 1995
- Last appearance: Episode 1220; 7 December 1995
In-universe information
- Occupation: Journalist

Mervyn Dale, portrayed by Glen Davies, was a journalist working for Walford Gazette. He first appeared on 4 December 1995 and appeared for three episodes. Mervyn wrote an article on Arthur Fowler (Bill Treacher) when he was arrested for embezzlement, which suggested that he stole the money to pay for the upkeep of his long-term mistress, Christine Hewitt (Elizabeth Power). This was Davies' first of three roles in EastEnders, as he went on to play an unnamed plumber in 2013, and then as Terry Cant, the father of Sonia Fowler (Natalie Cassidy), in 2025.

== April Branning ==
April Branning, played by Debbie Arnold, is the eldest daughter of Jim (John Bardon). The character is introduced in December 1995 as the "fun-loving" sister of Carol Jackson (Lindsey Coulson). Her entrance storyline is part of a plot that leads to the marriage of Carol and her boyfriend Alan (Howard Antony) – when April is jilted at the altar, Carol and Alan marry in her place. The character is turned into a regular in 1996, moving to the soap's setting of Albert Square. At the time, Jaci Stephen, television critic for The Mirror described April as a kind of character "who, from the moment they open their mouths, appear to have been around for ever." She added, "She has bleached blonde hair, overdresses and has the kind of flirtatious manner guaranteed to drive the Square's women to violence. As April grows more glamorous Cindy (Michelle Collins) grows more dowdy."

== Others ==
Character	Date(s)	Actor	Circumstances
Jeff	2 January	Steve Durbin	Two young men who Bianca Jackson and Natalie Price see when they are walking through the Market after Bianca has finished her first shift at Ian Beale's Fish and Chip Shop. When they all meet up, Jeff and Matthew take an immediate interest in Natalie and call her "sweet pants" and ask her what her name is. Bianca muscles in and introduces herself, but is then abruptly told that she is not been talked to. Bianca is then asked if she has ever seen the musical Grease. Natalie is flattered that she has received some attention, since she hardly ever gets any attention. She also takes pleasure from the fact that for once it is Bianca that has been ignored.
Matthew	2 January	Jason Barry	
Derek	5 January	Frank Boyce	Derek and Vince are two of a group of four men who spend the night drinking in the Vic. All four are extremely loud and disturb the other drinkers and annoy Pat Butcher, who is running the pub. Derek appears to be the group ringleader and is very rude to Binnie Roberts and gives her the run around when ordering drinks and also does the same to Pat. The disruption and noise from the group continues even after Pat asks them politely to quieten down, as other drinkers are wanting a quiet drink. When glasses start being smashed Pat has had enough and attempts to throw them all out calling them "scum". Derek takes exception to this and he and the others refuse to leave, until Grant Mitchell intervenes to help Pat. Vince's only dialogue comes when the group are being thrown out and he tells Pat "We're only having a laugh" and "Oh give it a rest". Of the group of four only Derek and Vince are credited and are the only two with any dialogue.
Vince	5 January	Dominic Brunt	
Pearson	10 January	Stephen MacKenna	Pearson is a middle aged gentleman, who comes into the Cafe towards the end of the day when Natalie Price is working on her own. Pearson takes an immediate shine to Natalie and invites her out for drink when her shift finishes. Natalie is not interested and appears to be a little bit spooked by Pearson and tells him that she is busy that night. Pearson orders some food and after he has finished his meal reads his paper. He leaves at closing time wishing Natalie good night.
Mr Naylor	16 January	Tom Bowles	Mr Derek Naylor, (credited as Mr Naylor), is an officer from the Council Housing Department who arrives to inspect the accommodation that Nellie Ellis is living in with Jules Tavernier, after Nellie has made enquiries about her being rehoused. Prior to Mr Naylor's arrival, Nellie has told the Council that the accommodation she is living in is "awful". When Mr Naylor does arrive, he finds the house is freezing cold and he is told by Nellie that she cannot afford to use the fire, gas or the electric and that that is the situation all the time and the house is also full of damp. Nellie also implies to Mr Naylor that when she previously stayed with Pauline Fowler and Arthur Fowler, things were even worse.Mr Naylor seems genuinely concerned by the situation. What Mr Naylor doesn't know, is that Nellie is lying and has deliberately turned everything off to leave the house freezing cold, as she is making a veiled attempt to persuade Jules to let her stay in his home. Jules does stand up for Nellie when Mr Naylor tells her that she doesn't have to feel ashamed of her situation.
Punter	17 January	Ian Soundy	A gentleman, (who is only credited as Punter), who arrives at the Turf Accountants where Debbie Bates works, to collect his winnings from earlier in the day. He presses Debbie to let him have his winnings as he has a cab waiting. Debbie meanwhile is distracted as she has not put a bet on for Sanjay Kapoor and the race is just starting as she is serving the gentleman.
Deano	19 January–8 August (5 episodes)	Daniel Mendoza	A friend of Robbie Jackson's, who tries to help Robbie organise a party, while Carol Jackson and Alan Jackson are attending a wedding in Leeds. He later attends the party and gets involved in the fighting when the party turns into a brawl. Deano, Robbie and Shane attend a pub-a-thon event at The Vic and spot the collection jar. Shane later steals the money, and Willy Roper initially accuses Deano and Robbie.
Plumber	19 January	Joe Cushley	At the start of the day Kathy Beale has problems with her water and taps at the Cafe as there is a constant banging sound. Kathy attempts to call a Plumber, but can get hold of no one until that evening. In the end Kathy successfully fixes the problem herself, after the efforts of Arthur Fowler and Binnie Roberts come to no use. Moments after sorting the problem a Plumber turns up saying he has had a couple of cancellations. Kathy is not pleased at the Plumber's arrival.
Andy	23–24 January (2 episodes)	Andrew Fraser	Two other friends of Robbie Jackson, who Robbie meets up, (along with Deano) and discusses with them the forthcoming part that is planned in the absence of Robbie's parents. At the party, Bianca Jackson and Robbie try to pair Andy up with Natalie Price. Although Natalie likes the company of Andy, she doesn't want anything else. Andy tries to force Natalie to have sex with him. When Ricky Butcher, hears Natalie's screams Ricky angrily throws Andy out, which results in the party turning into a brawl.
Wedge	23–24 January (2 episodes)	Glen Berry	
Kerry	24 January	Kerry Potter	Two friends of Bianca Jackson, who attend the party that Bianca and Robbie Jackson have organised. Ange works at an ice rink, which now has its own hockey team. Kerry and Ange are interested to know when some blokes are going to turn up. Kerry asks Bianca if she wants to share hers. Bianca tells Kerry to "keep your hands off". Later Kerry and Ange are involved in the fighting and arguing that erupts when the party turns into a brawl.
Ange	24 January	Sacha Craise	Two friends of Bianca Jackson, who attend the party that Bianca and Robbie Jackson have organised. Ange works at an ice rink, which now has its own hockey team. Kerry and Ange are interested to know when some blokes are going to turn up. Kerry asks Bianca if she wants to share hers. Bianca tells Kerry to "keep your hands off". Later Kerry and Ange are involved in the fighting and arguing that erupts when the party turns into a brawl.
Hugh Aitken	17–20 April	Donald Douglas	Ruth Aitken's parents and siblings. After she gets engaged to Mark Fowler, her father Hugh insists that they marry in Scotland. The Aitkens host a dinner where they meet the Fowlers, although Ruth and Mark are late. Hugh and Maureen question Ruth and Mark about their future plans, particularly children, and wonder if they are ready to get married. Mark and Ruth eventually tell Hugh and Maureen that Mark has HIV, and they immediately assume that he also has AIDS. Hugh asks that they make other sleeping arrangements and Maureen begs Ruth not to marry Mark. Pauline Fowler later confronts Maureen and implores her to attend the wedding. Although she and Hugh initially refuse, Maureen, Susan and John turn up at the registry office to see Ruth marry. Hugh attends the reception, where he refuses to give Mark and Ruth his blessing. Hugh suffers a stroke in December 1997 and Ruth goes up to Scotland to be with him. Hugh dies the following month.
Maureen Aitken	17–20 April	Sandra Clark	
John	17–20 April	Gary Cross	
Susan	17–20 April	Morag Brownlie	
Caroline Webber	14 August–14 November (4 episodes)	Francesca Hall	Liam Tyler's girlfriend. She accompanies him and his daughter Clare Tyler on a day out, and meets Claire's step-father Nigel Bates upon his return home. She is also present when Liam is late to collect Claire. The day before Clare's custody hearing, Nigel asks Caroline if Liam has been violent toward her and she denies that he has. However, when they arrive in court the next day Caroline is noticeably subdued. Caroline takes the stand and is asked by a barrister if Liam has been violent. She is nervous and takes time in answering and replies that he has never been violent until the previous evening then breaks down and reveals prominent bruising on her arm. After the court rules Clare can stay with Nigel, Nigel tells Caroline that whatever happens with Liam, she is welcome to visit Clare any time.
Detective Constable Rice	22 November 1995 – 28 March 1996 (2 episodes)	Graeme Edler	Unknown
