= Sanjay Kapoor (EastEnders) =

Fictional character from the BBC soap opera EastEnders

- EastEnders character
- Portrayed by: Deepak Verma
- Duration: 1993–1998
- First appearance: Episode 837; 9 February 1993
- Last appearance: Episode 1673; 24 September 1998
- Spin-off appearances: Dimensions in Time (1993)
In-universe information
- Occupation: Market trader
- Mother: Neelam Kapoor
- Wife: Gita Kapoor
- Daughters: Sharmilla Kapoor
- Stepsons: Arjun Kapoor

Sanjay Kapoor is a fictional character from the BBC soap opera EastEnders, played by Deepak Verma from 9 February 1993 to 24 September 1998.

Sanjay is a market trader, and has an eye for the ladies and a weakness for gambling. He has big ideas and get-rich-quick schemes, which never end up working.

== Development ==
In 1998, EastEnders acquired a new executive producer, Matthew Robinson. Robinson was dubbed "the axeman" in the British press, after a large proportion of the EastEnders cast either quit, or were culled, shortly after Robinson's introduction. It was reported that Robinson hoped the changes would attract more viewers and "spice up [the soap's fictional setting of] Walford". Among the departing characters were long-running Asian family the Kapoors, including Sanjay, Gita and Neelam Kapoor. As they were the only Asian characters in the show, EastEnders received criticism for axing them from black and Asian MPs, including Oona King, MP for East End constituency Bethnal Green and Dr Ashok Kumar.

== Storylines ==
Sanjay is first seen in Albert Square in February 1993 as a friend of market inspector Richard Cole (Ian Reddington), who comes to persuade him to bend the rules and give him a pitch in the market for his clothing stall. Richard gives him Rachel Kominski (Jacquetta May)'s permanent pitch, much to her dismay. Sanjay, a Hindu, is married to Gita Kapoor (Shobu Kapoor) and at the time of his arrival she is heavily pregnant with their first child, which is due in March 1993. They had been living separately since the failure of their previous business, and Sanjay needs to find them a home. However, he gambles away their flat-deposit money, so they have to lodge with Richard until Sanjay (via more gambling) manages to get some money together and put down a deposit on flat number 43B Albert Square, the very day Gita gives birth to their daughter Sharmilla (Priya Bilkhu). Soon after, Sanjay gets into trouble with trading standards for selling fake designer labels on his clothing stall. Gita despairs over Sanjay's moneymaking schemes as they all end disastrously.

Sanjay doesn't get along with Meena McKenzie (Sudha Bhuchar), Gita's bossy, snooty, domineering sister, who has always looked down on Sanjay. So he isn't pleased when she arrives on their doorstep in July, announcing her intention to stay. She immediately causes friction between Sanjay and Gita with her constant criticisms and Sanjay soon kicks her out. But Meena is a constant visitor to the Square, always spying on Sanjay and keeping Gita informed of his exploits. Gita is suffering from severe post-natal depression and she and Sanjay have regular shouting matches, which only drives Sanjay away. Gita decides she needs a break, so in December she leaves Sharmilla with Sanjay and visits relatives. Sanjay is hopeless at child care and immediately summons Meena and invites her to stay and help out.

Late one night in early January, much earlier than expected, Gita comes home. As she creeps into the flat to check on Sharmilla, she sees Sanjay and Meena sleeping naked in her bed. Hurt and disgusted, Gita throws them out of the flat amid a tirade of abuse. She goes on to refuse Sanjay access to their stall, and to Sharmilla, and then tells Meena's husband, Jerry McKenzie, about the affair. After many insults and much provocation from Jerry, an enraged Sanjay finally admits that he'd been having sex with Meena for months, 3 or 4 nights a week. Gita takes Sharmilla and leaves Walford, but a few months later they return and move back into the flat. She and Sanjay share the stall work and care of Sharmilla and Sanjay believes he and Gita will be back together soon. But Meena is also around too much, trying to reconcile with Gita as well, which frustrates his efforts. Later the year, Gita becomes the target of racist attacks. While attempting to defend Gita from an attempted home invasion by a gang, Sanjay beats up the gang leader (Eddie Marsan) and is wrongfully arrested for assault. He is released with a caution, and Sanjay and Gita reconcile on Christmas Day and spend the night together. Gita is quick to remind Sanjay that their night of passion was just about sex, but during 1995 they continue to meet regularly for sex. Eventually Gita agrees to give their marriage another try and let him move back in.

In September, Sanjay returns to India to look after his dying grandfather, on his return, he mistakenly thinks that Gita has been having sex with Guppy Sharma (Lyndam Gregory), who is actually Meena's new fiancé. Gita corrects him and in 1996, Guppy persuades him to invest £2000 in a dodgy business venture. However, Guppy is a conman, and after Sanjay gives him the money, he disappears, leaving to face huge debts, and a furious Gita. Later in the year, Sanjay decides that he wants another child. When he and Gita fail to conceive, they consult doctors, and Sanjay is diagnosed with a low sperm count. Sanjay spends several weeks questioning his manhood, nursing his wounded pride, and taking it out on Gita; in the midst of this, Sanjay's father dies and Sanjay has to go back to India for another funeral. When he returns in March 1997, his mother Neelam (Jamila Massey) is with him, and she joins the troubled household. Neelam's traditional views often clash with those of Gita, and Sanjay is often caught in the middle of their spats.

In October, Gita announces she is taking Sharmilla and going to visit her sister for a few days. She keeps postponing her return, and Sanjay enjoys his freedom, spending his time drinking, gambling, and flirting. Gita announces that she is finally returning with Sharmilla in January 1998, but Sanjay is late to meet them at the train station. When he finally arrives, they are nowhere to be seen. When there is still no sign of them days later, Sanjay calls the police, but they suspect that he has something to do with his wife's disappearance. They question everyone on the Square and build up a picture of a feeble, infertile womanizer who is prone to aggressive outbursts towards his wife. Next the police see blood on the door of Sanjay's van and are skeptical when Sanjay explains that it is his. Their theory is proven correct when DNA tests confirm that the blood matches Gita's type, not Sanjay's. Sanjay is arrested on suspicion of murder. Sanjay's solicitor manages to get him released and tells him they have no real evidence and were holding him in the hope that he would confess. Eventually the police confirm that the blood isn't either Gita's or Sharmilla's, so Sanjay is in the clear.

Sanjay spends the rest of the year gambling and drinking himself into a stupor and he eventually accepts that Gita and Sharmilla are probably dead. But that July, Gita contacts her friend on the Square, Ruth Fowler (Caroline Paterson). She desperately needs money and help but makes Ruth promise not to tell Sanjay. However, Sanjay finds out and makes Ruth take him with her to meet Gita in Birmingham. They are shocked to discover Gita with a newborn baby. She explains that she had become pregnant after a one-night stand and had run away instead of facing Sanjay; then the father had abandoned her. Sanjay is furious, but after much soul-searching he decides he can be a loving father to this innocent new child, Arjun (Amar Malik), and give their marriage another chance. Unable to forgive her daughter-in-law's infidelity, Neelam decides to go and live with family in Bristol; she disowns Sanjay on her way out. Sanjay and Gita are happy for the short while until local reporter Polly Becker (Victoria Gould) discovers their recent scandal. After secretly taping confessions from Sanjay and Ruth, she gets their shocking story published in the Walford Gazette. Suddenly all of Walford know what had transpired in Gita's absence. From then on, Sanjay and Gita are hounded by reporters and Sharmilla is bullied at school. The Kapoors decide that their only option is to leave Walford forever. Their last appearance is in September 1998.

== Reception ==
In 2020, Sara Wallis and Ian Hyland from The Daily Mirror placed Sanjay 88th on their ranked list of the best EastEnders characters of all time, calling him "Handsome" and commenting that his "eye for the ladies" and "huge gambling problem" did not "go down well" with Gita.
