= Silver Street =

- Silver Street logo used on the BBC website
- Genre: Soap opera
- Running time: 10 minutes
- Country of origin: United Kingdom
- Language: English
- Home station: BBC Asian Network
- Written by: List of writers
- Original release: 24 May 2004 – 26 March 2010
- No. of episodes: 1,525
- Audio format: Stereo
- Website: Official website

Silver Street is a radio soap opera broadcast on the BBC Asian Network from 24 May 2004 to 26 March 2010. It was the first soap to be aimed at the British South Asian community,

== Broadcast history ==
It was introduced in 2004 as part of the Sonia Deol show, which was replaced from 24 April 2006 by the Anita Rani show, and until 12 May 2006 each episode had an early evening repeat at 19.20–19.30 in the Drive Programme. Since 15 May 2006 the serial had been broadcast from 13.30 to 13.40 each weekday during the Nikki Bedi show. The Omnibus edition of the show was broadcast every Sunday between 16.30 and 17.00.

In 2007 it became one of the first BBC Asian Network programmes to be available as a podcast and was the most downloaded show on the network. On 21 April 2008 BBC Radio Leicester began to broadcast current episodes of the show after a few weeks of highlights and compilations to introduce the stories.

== Synopsis ==
Storylines focused on the lives of a primarily British South Asian community in an English town of unspecified name and location, with themes that generally related to issues that affect the daily lives of British South Asians and their neighbours.

Many guest stars appeared in the programme, including Saeed Jaffrey as the family doctor of the Chauhan family at a point in the story when the character Roopa Chauhan was struggling with bulimia, Sonia Deol (as herself) popping into a shop on the street on one occasion, and Toyah Willcox playing the estranged mother of major Silver Street character Sean Brady.

== Main cast list ==
Character (actor):

- Rita Chauhan (Bharti Patel)
- Jas Chauhan (Hema Mangoo)
- Roopa Chauhan (Rakhee Thakrar)
- Arun Chauhan (Naithan Ariane)
- Kamla Dattani (Surendra Kochar)
- Mushtaq Jilani (Paul Bhattacharjee)
- Zenab Jilani (Sudha Bhuchar)
- Rozena Hussaini (Pooja Ghai)
- Sameer Hussaini (Alex Caan)
- Pervaiz Akhtar (Shajait Khan)
- Nadia Akhtar (Sohm Kapila)
- Zak Akhtar (Jetinder Summan)
- Mary Brady (Carole Nimmons)
- Pete Brady (Jez Thomas)
- Sean Brady (Kee Ramsorrun then Lloyd Thomas)
- Brian Kavanagh (Gerard McDermott)
- Kuljit Singh (Sartaj Garewal)
- Sway Holloway (Mark Monero)
- Jodie Howard (Vineeta Rishi)
- Jaggy Singh (Jay Kiyani)
- Simran Kaur (Balvinder Sopal)
- Wahid Masud (Saeed Jaffrey)
- Shazia Malik (Shobu Kapoor)
- Ambika (Ayesha Dharker)

== Special appearances ==
- Nikki Sanderson as Faye Dunbar
- Ian Watkins (Steps) as Dave Thomas
- John Altman as Mr Walsh
- Kim Vithana as Farrah Malik
- Pal Aron as Akram Malik
- J Skillz as himself
- John Abraham as himself
- John Craven as himself
- Raghav as himself
- Hard Kaur as herself
- MC Raa as himself
- Anita Dobson as Sandra Lester

== Writers ==
Silver Street had a roster of around six writers at a time that changed over the years. Commissions were made monthly and each writer was commissioned to write one week of episodes. Past writers include:

- Sonali Battacharya
- Gurpreet Bhati
- Lorna French
- Tanika Gupta
- Shai Hussain
- Waris Islam
- Kris Kenway
- Sonia Likhari
- Amber Lone
- Nirjay Mahindru
- Anjum Malik
- Prakash Patel
- Philip Qizilbash
- Saman Shad
- Sukhbender Singh
- Darren Rapier

== Cancellation ==
On 16 November 2009, the BBC announced that they would be cancelling Silver Street. The final episode (number 1,525) was broadcast on 26 March 2010. The song played at the end of the final episode was "Silver Street" by Ben Folds. The cancellation grew out of criticisms of the Asian Network in the BBC Trust's annual report. In July 2009 it was revealed that the Asian Network had lost 20% of its listeners in one year and, per listener, was the most expensive BBC Station. Silver Street was replaced by monthly half-hour dramas.
