= Jamila Massey =

Indian actress and writer (born 1934)

- Born: 7 January 1934 (age 92); Shimla, Punjab Province, India (now in Himachal Pradesh, India)
- Occupations: Actress; writer

Jamila Massey (born 7 January 1934) is an Indian actress and writer. Massey has had a long career on UK television and radio. She is known for playing Auntie Satya in the long-running radio soap The Archers, Jamila Ranjha in Mind Your Language, and Sanjay Kapoor's mother Neelam in EastEnders.

== Early life ==
Massey came to Britain with her parents in 1946 at the age of 12. Her father fought in the Second World War but remained in the UK and became a producer for the BBC.

As a child, Massey acted for the BBC in radio children's programmes. She attended King's College London and graduated in Latin, Urdu and English. She had aspirations to train as an actress; however, her mother frowned upon such a career. Massey's mother refused to allow her to attend drama school after the death of her father, so she was forced to use subterfuge to fulfil her acting ambitions.

== Career ==
She began her career as an extra. Her first film role was in Sink the Bismarck! (1960), where she was used to translate and report a news section from the film into Urdu — announcing the sinking of the British battleship HMS Hood.

She continued to work extensively on radio in English, Urdu, Hindi and Punjabi as well as for the German service of the BBC. Years later she acted in Tribunal, a ZDF television serial in German, with leading European actors. She joined the Afro-Asian Committee of Equity and continued to work in film and television. Roles for Asian actors were scarce during her early career, but she was given parts in series such as Crossroads (1964); Within These Walls (1976); The Next Man (1976); Z-Cars (1976–1977); Target (1977); Mind Your Language (1977–79); Play for Today (1977, 1978); Empire Road (1979); Angels (1981); Minder (1982); The Jewel in the Crown (1984); The Bill (1984); Albion Market (1985); Chance in a Million (1986); Madame Sousatzka (1988); Great Balls of Fire! (1989); Brookside (1989) playing Manju Batra and Pie in the Sky (1994).

In the mid-1990s she was cast as the recurring character Auntie Satya in Radio 4's daily agricultural soap opera, The Archers, fulfilling one of her life's ambitions. Massey was the second actress to play the role. She had initially been asked to audition for the part, but was forced to turn it down due to work commitments. A year later she was offered the same part when the role was recast. Her character makes occasional appearances to visit her niece, Usha Gupta (Souad Faress).

In 1997 she was cast in the popular BBC soap opera EastEnders. She played Neelam Kapoor, the domineering mother of market-trader Sanjay (Deepak Verma) until 1998.

Other acting credits include Arabian Nights (2000); Adrian Mole: The Cappuccino Years (2001); Perfect World (2001); Doctors (2002); All About Me (2003); Chicken Tikka Masala (2005).

Massey's theatre work includes The Great Celestial Cow (Royal Court), Conduct Unbecoming which toured Canada as well as the UK, Song for a Sanctuary (Kali Theatre UK tour) and Women of the Dust (Tamasha Theatre and Bristol Old Vic). She also played Kasturba in Mahatma versus Gandhi in the BBC Home and World Services and Harvey Virdi in Calcutta Kosher, a play on the Indian Jewish Community of Kolkata.

As well as acting, Massey has also co-authored several books with her husband, writer Reginald Massey. One was a novel, The Immigrants, based on field research among first-generation Asians in Britain. The other books were The Music of India, for which Ravi Shankar provided a foreword, and The Dances of India. Massey is deeply interested and involved in music; she has introduced several Indian musicians and dancers to audiences in the West.

Massey appeared in Coronation Street in February 2010 as one of Sunita's aunts.

== Personal life ==
Massey and her husband, the author and poet Reginald Massey, live in Llanidloes, Wales.

== Writings ==
- The Music of India. London: Kahn & Averill. 1993. ISBN 1-871-08250-1.
