= Shobu Kapoor =

British actress

- Born: Shobu Kapoor; May 1961 (age 65); India
- Other name: Shoboo Kapoor
- Citizenship: United Kingdom
- Education: University of Mumbai; Drama Studio London
- Occupation: Actress
- Years active: 1991–present

Shobu Kapoor (born May 1961) is a British actress. She is most notable for playing the role of Gita Kapoor, the long-suffering wife of market trader Sanjay (Deepak Verma), in the BBC soap opera EastEnders from 1993 to 1998.

== Early life ==
Shobu Kapoor was born in India. She attended the University of Mumbai, where she earned her Master of Arts in Literature in 1986. She immigrated to the United Kingdom in 1988. Kapoor trained at Drama Studio London.

== Career ==
After leaving Eastenders, Kapoor appeared in the 2002 film Bend It Like Beckham and the TV series The Bill (2004). She has also been in Chicken Tikka Masala (2005), Casualty (2005) and Doctors, where she appeared as five characters between 2000 and 2006.

In 2006, she appeared in the BBC drama Banglatown Banquet and the Irish RTÉ soap Fair City (as Talayeh Kirmani). In 2007, she played the minor role of Umi in the Channel 4 drama Shameless. In 2008, she appeared in "Journey's End", the series four finale of Doctor Who, where her character perished at the hands of the Daleks.

Other film roles include Taj's mother in Van Wilder: The Rise of Taj (2006) and Mrs Khan in Mischief Night (2006). She portrayed the mother of Meredith Kercher in the TV film Amanda Knox: Murder on Trial in Italy (2011).

Kapoor played the roles of Shazia Malik in the BBC Asian Network radio soap Silver Street and Razia Khan in the BBC sitcom Citizen Khan.

In 2013, she co-founded the independent film and television company, Roman Candle Productions, with Annetta Laufer. She worked there, producing short films until she left in 2016.

In 2015, she made a guest appearance in the CBBC show Hank Zipzer. That year, Kapoor was announced as part of the cast of Anthony Horowitz's play Dinner with Saddam on the West End.

In 2020, Kapoor appeared in The Other One as Mishti.

In 2021, she appeared in Casualty playing Mona Nadkarni, a 'friend' of Dr Rashid Masum's family, who was brought into the emergency department by Rash's father. She made an appearance in Greg Davies' BBC comedy The Cleaner the same year.

In 2022, she appeared as Lady Sheffield in the second season of Netflix's historical fiction-romance show Bridgerton. Kapoor joined the cast of the 2022 television film adaption of David Walliams' children's book Gangsta Granny Strikes Again! She has also featured in Gangsta Granny, the prequel got popular so she reprised her role in the sequel.

She appeared as Fatima Khan in Nida Manzoor's action comedy film Polite Society (2023).

== Filmography ==
=== Film ===
| Year | TItle | Role | Notes |
|---|---|---|---|
| 2000 | Room to Rent | Home Office Official | |
| 2002 | Bend It Like Beckham | Polly | |
| 2005 | Chicken Tikka Masala | Minaxi Patel | |
| 2006 | Mischief Night | Mrs Khan | |
| 2006 | Van Wilder: The Rise of Taj | Taj's Mother | |
| 2008 | Filth and Wisdom | Sardeep's Wife | |
| 2010 | The Infidel | Kashmina | |
| 2012 | Acts of Godfrey | Gita | |
| 2014 | Some Things | Miss Stewart | Short film |
| 2015 | Shoot Me. Kiss Me. Cut! | Mother | |
| 2018 | Boogie Man | Anandi | |
| 2018 | Lady Parts | Seema | Short film |
| 2020 | Home for Aged Time Travelers | Dr. Ritisha | |
| 2022 | The Reach | Shobu | Short film |
| 2022 | Two Minutes | | Short film |
| 2022 | The Warning Signs | Shobu | Short film |
| 2022 | Mother Teresa & Me | Aparna, Kavita's Mother | |
| 2023 | Polite Society | Fatima | |
| 2023 | Tall Dark and Handsome | Rohini | Short film |
| 2023 | Running on Empty | Seema Khan | Short film |
| TBA | Human 2.0 | Laxshmi Parry | Short film; In Production |

=== Television ===
| Year | Title | Role | Notes |
|---|---|---|---|
| 1991 | Family Pride | Nasreen | |
| 1993 | Doctor Who: Dimensions in Time | Gita Kapoor | Miniseries; 2 episodes |
| 1993-1998, 2026- | EastEnders | Gita Kapoor | Main role; 346 episodes |
| 2000-2016 | Doctors | Dr. Shareen Sing / Anita Shah / Mrs Khan / Tasneem Malik | 5 episodes |
| 2004 | Nevermind Nirvana | Dr. Sarita Mehta | TV movie |
| 2004 | The Bill | Mrs. Miah | Episode: "The Cautious Approach" |
| 2005-2023 | Casualty | Namjeev Singh / Hasina Hussein / Chanda Perry / Mona Nadkarni | 6 episodes |
| 2006 | Banglatown Banquet | Joolie | TV movie |
| 2006 | Fair City | Talayeh Kirmani | 3 episodes |
| 2007 | Shameless | Umi | Episode: "Revelations" |
| 2008 | Doctor Who | Scared Woman | Episode: "Journey's End" |
| 2010 | Holby City | Mrs. Chiddy | Episode: "Snow Queens" |
| 2011 | Amanda Knox: Murder on Trial in Italy | Arlene Kercher | TV movie |
| 2011 | The Jury | Rashid's Mother | 5 episodes |
| 2012 | Silent Witness | Raani Amar | Episode: "Death Has No Dominion: Part 2" |
| 2012-2016 | Citizen Khan | Mrs Khan | Main role; 33 episodes |
| 2015 | Hank Zipzer | Mrs. Chopra | 2 episodes |
| 2016 | Children in Need: Fantastic Beasts Special | Mrs Khan | TV short |
| 2017 | Loaded | Harvinder Jindal | Episode: "Watto's Mum" |
| 2017 | Comedy Playhouse | Rita | Episode: "Mister Winner" |
| 2017 | The Boy with the Topknot | Aunt Jugi | TV movie |
| 2018 | Joe All Alone | Social Worker | Episode: "Escape" |
| 2018 | The Split | Annie Butler | 2 episodes |
| 2018 | Unforgotten | Usha | 3 episodes |
| 2018-2019 | Krypton | Mama Zed | 2 episodes |
| 2019 | Cleaning Up | Barsha | 2 episodes |
| 2019 | Four Weddings and a Funeral | Nani | Miniseries; 4 episodes |
| 2020 | The Other One | Mishti | Episode: "#1.6" |
| 2020 | I Hate Suzie | Dr. Wack | Episode: "Bargaining" |
| 2020 | The Dark Tower | Rhea of the Coos | TV movie |
| 2021 | We Are Lady Parts | Seema | 5 episodes |
| 2021 | The Cleaner | Neeta | Episode: "The Widow" |
| 2022 | A Discovery of Witches | Linda Crosby | 3 episodes |
| 2022 | Bridgerton | Lady Sheffield | Episode: "An Unthinkable Fate" |
| 2022 | DI Ray | Debo Ray | 2 episodes |
| 2022 | Whitstable Pearl | Hiral | Episode: "To Those We Love" |
| 2022 | Gangsta Granny Strikes Again! | Esha | TV movie |
| 2023 | Three Little Birds | Miss Biswas | 4 episodes |

=== On stage ===
| Year | Title | Role | Director | Venue | Ref. |
|---|---|---|---|---|---|
| 2015 | Dinner with Saddam | Samira | Anthony Horowitz | Menier Chocolate Factory | |

=== Audio dramas ===
| Year | Title | Role | Notes | Ref. |
|---|---|---|---|---|
| 2017 | Doctor Who: The Monthly Adventures | Sai Chopra | Episode: "Vortex Ice / Cortex Fire" | |
| 2022 | Torchwood: Monthly Range | Priya | Episode: "Sonny" | |

=== Radio dramas ===
| Year | Title | Role | Station | Notes | Ref. |
|---|---|---|---|---|---|
| | Silver Street | Shazia Malik | BBC Asian Network | | |
| 2014 | Karma | Sanjana | BBC Radio 4 | | |
| 2017 | No Smoke | Parmindar | BBC Radio 4 | | |

== Filmmaking ==
=== As producer ===
| Year | Title | Notes | Ref. |
|---|---|---|---|
| 2016 | Scarlet | | |
| 2016 | Afro Punk Girl | | |
| 2021 | The Markfield Monster | Executive producer | |

== Awards and nominations ==
| Year | Award | Category | Work | Result | Ref. |
|---|---|---|---|---|---|
| 2016 | Asian Women of Achievement Awards | Arts & Culture | —N/a | Nominated | |
