= Lyndam Gregory =

Indian-British actor (1955–2014)

Lyndam Gregory (c. 1955 – 15 July 2014) was an Indian-born British theatre, television, soap opera, and voiceover actor. His best known credits include his portrayal of Sammy Patel on Coronation Street in 1983, his recurring role as Guppy Sharma on EastEnders from 1995 to 1996, and Ashok in The Archers. Gregory also played Dr. Simon Field on ITV television series, Surgical Spirit, for 23 episodes from 1989 to 1992.

== Early life ==
Gregory was born in Darjeeling, West Bengal, India. His father, Neville, was a tea planter, while his mother, Marina, who was originally from Burma, was a local schoolteacher. Gregory and his family moved to London during the early 1960s.

== Professional career ==
Gregory studied at the Webber Douglas Academy of Dramatic Art. His first professional acting role was in a production of "The Blue Monster", performed at the Arts Theatre in London. His first television role was an episode of Rumpole of the Bailey as Latif Khan in 1979.

Gregory became best known for his work on British soap operas, including his recurring role as businessman Guppy Sharma on EastEnders during the mid-1990s. According to his wife, Gregory especially enjoyed working on EastEnders because Elstree Studios, where the show was filmed, was the site of numerous, classic film productions.

Gregory also worked narrating audiobooks.

== Personal life ==
Gregory died from lung cancer on 15 July 2014 at the age of 59. His death was announced on 21 August in an obituary by his wife, Christine Gregory, published in The Guardian. A non-smoker, Gregory had first been diagnosed in July 2013. His funeral was held at the Breakspear Crematorium in Ruislip on 1 August 2014. Gregory was survived by his wife, Christine, and their daughter, Dominique.

== Partial filmography ==
- Funny Money (1983) – Ashed
