= Deepak Verma =

British actor (born 1969)

Deepak Verma (born 11 February 1969) is a British actor, writer and television/film producer of Indian Punjabi descent and Hindu heritage. His role as market-stall trader Sanjay Kapoor in long-running BBC One soap opera EastEnders brought him to the attention of UK mainstream viewers.

== Career ==
Verma trained at the Central School of Speech and Drama. He made his television debut in the Scottish detective series Taggart in 1992. However, he is best known for his portrayal of the adulterous gambler Sanjay Kapoor in the popular BBC soap opera EastEnders (1993–1998). During his time on the show, Verma's character was central to many explosive storylines, including the breakdown of his marriage to Gita (Shobu Kapoor), caused by his extramarital affair with her sister, as well as being falsely accused of her suspected murder. The couple eventually left Walford together in the midst of press scandal.

Verma was appointed Member of the Order of the British Empire (MBE) in the 2017 Birthday Honours for services to the arts. He is a Doctor Of Philosophy (UEL, Bruford College 2024) in the area of Yogic Phenomenology, Actor Training and Pranic Studies.

Since leaving EastEnders in 1998, Verma has set up his own film and television production company, Pukkanasha Films.

His first play, Pool of Tranquility, was selected in the finals of the Royal Court Young People's Theatre's young writers' festival in 1992, where it was a finalist. That led to a BBC Radio 4 commission to write a play based on the life of India's most famous bandit, Phoolan Devi, 'Bandit Queen'. He's since penned further plays for Radio 4, the BBC World Service and a play at the King's Head, Islington, London. His adaptation of 'Wuthering Heights'at the Lyric Hammersmith was critically acclaimed. He also adapted Therese Raquin for the Lyric Hammersmith. In 2010 he wrote, produced and directed His award winning short 'Mumbai Charlie' about a community in India who worship Charlie Chaplin.

Verma was chosen to represent the UK at the Talent Campus at the Berlinale 2004, Berlin Film Festival.

Deepak won an award for achievement for his contribution to the arts, presented by Keith Vaz MP at the House of Commons in 1997.

Verma continues to act on mainstream television in the UK and US.

In 2010 Verma conceived Faith Shorts, a global film competition to inspire young people to make short films about their faith. This was developed and produced by the Tony Blair Faith Foundation and is an annual event.
