= List of former EastEnders characters =

This is a list of former characters from the BBC soap opera EastEnders, ordered by the year in which they made their final appearance. In the case that more than one actor has portrayed a character, the most recent actor portraying the character is listed last.

== 1980s ==
=== Last appeared in 1985 ===
| Character | Actor(s) | Duration |
|---|---|---|
| Reg Cox | Johnnie Clayton | 1985 |
| Hassan Osman | Michael Evangelou | 1985 |
| Ernie Mears | Ken Wynne | 1985 |
| Sheena Mennell | Dulice Liecier | 1985 |
| Saeed Jeffery | Andrew Johnson | 1985 |

=== Last appeared in 1986 ===
| Character | Actor(s) | Duration |
|---|---|---|
| Ruth Lyons | Judy Liebert | 1985–1986 |
| John Fisher | David Dale | 1986 |
| Tessa Parker | Josephine Melville | 1986 |
| Roy Quick | Douglas Fielding | 1985–1986 |
| Andy O'Brien | Ross Davidson | 1985–1986 |
| Harry Reynolds | Gareth Potter | 1986 |
| Cassie Carpenter | Delanie Forbes | 1985–1986 |

=== Last appeared in 1987 ===
| Character | Actor(s) | Duration |
|---|---|---|
| Eddie Hunter | Simon Henderson | 1986–1987 |
| Hannah Carpenter | Sally Sagoe | 1985–1987 |
| Oxley | Colum Gallivan | 1987 |
| Terry Rich | Gary Whelan | 1985, 1987 |
| Debbie Wilkins | Shirley Cheriton | 1985–1987 |
| Tony Carpenter | Oscar James | 1985–1987 |
| Auntie Irene | Katherine Parr | 1986–1987 |
| Kelvin Carpenter | Paul J. Medford | 1985–1987 |
| Tina Hopkins | Eleanor Rhodes | 1987 |
| Derek Taylor | Ken Sharrok | 1987 |
| Martin Hunter | Peter Purves | 1987 |
| Farrukh | Sumar Khan | 1987 |
| Naima Jeffery | Shreela Ghosh | 1985–1987 |
| Jaggat Singh | Amerjit Deu | 1986–1987 |

=== Last appeared in 1988 ===
| Character | Actor(s) | Duration |
|---|---|---|
| Gerry Fairweather | Jason Watkins | 1987–1988 |
| Rezaul Gabir | Tanveer Ghani | 1986–1988 |
| Graham Clark | Gary Webster | 1987–1988 |
| Kenny Beale | Michael Attwell | 1988 |
| Emine Osman | Pelim Ahmet | 1987–1988 |
| Murat Osman | Eddie Izzet | 1987–1988 |
| Rayif Osman | Billy Hassan | 1987–1988 |
| Magda Czajkowski | Kathryn Apanowicz | 1987–1988 |
| Elizabeth Beale | Lucy Bayler | 1988 |
| Tom Clements | Donald Tandy | 1986–1988 |
| Edie Smith | Eileen O'Brien | 1987–1988 |
| Darren Roberts | Gary McDonald | 1987–1988 |
| Lou Beale | Anna Wing | 1985–1988 |
| "Uncle" | Leonard Maguire | 1986–1988 |
| Chris Smith | Allan O'Keefe | 1985–1988 |
| Reg Sparrow | Richard Ireson | 1987–1988 |

=== Last appeared in 1989 ===
| Character | Actor(s) | Duration |
|---|---|---|
| Joanne Francis | Pamela Salem | 1988–1989 |
| Gillie Hampton | Clare James | 1988–1989 |
| Victor Hampton | Michael Brogan | 1988–1989 |
| Benny Bloom | Arnold Yarrow | 1988–1989 |
| Trevor Kellow | Peter Doran | 1988–1989 |
| Queenie Price | John Labanowski | 1988–1989 |
| Gregory Mantel | Pavel Douglas | 1988–1989 |
| Brad Williams | Jonathan Stratt | 1986–1989 |
| Guido Smith | Nicholas Donovan | 1988–1989 |
| Maxine Roberts | Ella Wilder | 1989 |
| Guizin Osman | Ishia Bennison | 1985–1989 |
| Mehmet Osman | Haluk Bilginer | 1985–1989 |
| DI Bob Ashley | Robin Lermitte | 1988–1989 |
| Donna Ludlow | Matilda Ziegler | 1987–1989 |
| WPC Alison Howard | Elaine Donnelly | 1985–1987, 1989 |
| Brian Wicks | Leslie Schofield | 1988–1989 |
| Sue Osman | Sandy Ratcliff | 1985–1989 |
| Matthew Jackson | Steven Hartley | 1988–1989 |
| Aisha Roberts | Aisha Jacob | 1987–1989 |
| Carmel Jackson | Judith Jacob | 1986–1989 |
| Little Ali Osman | Omer Mustafa Salih | 1988–1989 |
| David Samuels | Christopher Reich | 1988–1989 |
| Alan McIntyre | Pip Miller | 1987–1989 |
| Ali Osman | Nejdet Salih | 1985–1989 |
| Junior Roberts | Aaron Carrington | 1987–1989 |
| Melody | Lyanne Compton | 1988–1989 |
| Marie Davies | Vicky Murdock | 1989 |
| Reggie Thompson | John Rutland | 1989 |

== 1990s ==
=== Last appeared in 1990 ===
| Character | Actor(s) | Duration |
|---|---|---|
| Marge Green | Pat Coombs | 1989–1990 |
| Danny Whiting | Saul Jephcott | 1989–1990 |
| Harry Osborne | John Boswall | 1990 |
| Rod Norman | Christopher McHallem | 1987–1990 |
| Trevor Short | Phil McDermott | 1989–1990 |
| Paul Priestly | Mark Thrippleton | 1989–1990 |
| Laurie Bates | Gary Powell | 1989–1990 |
| Julie Cooper | Louise Plowright | 1989–1990 |
| Vince Johnson | Hepburn Graham | 1989–1990 |
| Barnsey Barnes | John Hallam | 1988–1990 |
| Charlie Cotton | Christopher Hancock | 1986–1990 |
| Shireen Karim | Nisha Kapur | 1988–1990 |
| Sohail Karim | Ronnie Jhutti | 1988–1990 |
| Ashraf Karim | Tony Wredden | 1987–1990 |
| Ashraf Karim | Aftab Sachak | 1987–1990 |
| Sufia Karim | Rani Singh | 1988–1990 |
| April McIntosh | Helen Pearson | 1990 |
| Carol Hanley | Sheila White | 1990 |
| Mo Butcher | Edna Doré | 1988–1990 |
| Henry Chadwick | Thomas Baptiste | 1990 |
| Pearl Chadwick | Ellen Thomas | 1990 |

=== Last appeared in 1991 ===
| Character | Actor(s) | Duration |
|---|---|---|
| Jasmine O'Brien | Uncredited | 1990–1991 |
| Ken Raynor | Ian Redford | 1990–1991 |
| Sandra Raynor | Rosalind Bailey | 1991 |
| Lorna | Cathy Murphy | 1991 |
| Jackie Stone | Richard Beale | 1990–1991 |
| Russell Nash | Ray Ashcroft | 1991 |
| Kevin Masters | Colin McCormack | 1991 |
| Dave Carter | David Cheeseman | 1991 |
| Irene Carter | Karen Murden | 1991 |
| George Lawler | Edmund Kente | 1991 |
| Eddie Royle | Michael Melia | 1990–1991 |
| Eibhlin O'Donnell | Mary Conlon | 1991 |

=== Last appeared in 1992 ===
| Character | Actor(s) | Duration |
|---|---|---|
| Christine Pretis | Vivien Heilbron | 1989–1992 |
| Anne Howes | Cassie Stuart | 1992 |
| Terry Howes | Neal Swettenham | 1992 |
| Jonathan Hewitt | Jonny Lee Miller | 1992 |
| Gary Phillips | Scott Lane | 1992 |
| Willy (dog) | Willy | 1985–1992 |
| Lloyd Tavernier | Garey Bridges | 1990–1992 |
| Keith Steer | Tim Dantay | 1992 |
| Charlie Keating | Nicholas Tennant | 1992 |
| Gill Fowler | Susanna Dawson | 1991–1992 |
| Adrian Bell | Joseph Marcell | 1992 |
| Lilian Kominski | Anna Korwin | 1992 |
| Donald Cameron | Robert Wilson | 1992 |

=== Last appeared in 1993 ===
| Character | Actor(s) | Duration |
|---|---|---|
| Joe Wallace | Jason Rush | 1991, 1993 |
| John Royle | Paddy Joyce | 1990–1991, 1993 |
| Snip Gibbons | Steve Sweeney | 1993 |
| Audrey Whittingham | Shirley Dixon | 1993 |
| Jack Woodman | James Gilbey | 1992–1993 |
| Rachel Kominski | Jacquetta May | 1991–1993 |
| Pete Beale | Peter Dean | 1985–1993 |
| Rose Chapman | Petra Markham | 1993 |
| Danny Taurus | Billy Boyle | 1993 |
| Celestine Tavernier | Leroy Golding | 1990–1993 |
| Clyde Tavernier | Steven Woodcock | 1990–1993 |
| Kofi Tavernier | Marcel Smith | 1990–1993 |
| Gidea Thompson | Sian Martin | 1993 |
| Christine Hewitt | Lizzie Power | 1992–1993 |
| Roly (dog) | Roly | 1985–1993 |
| Sylvia Weng-Chung | Rachel Hiew | 1993 |
| Aidan Brosnan | Sean Maguire | 1993 |

=== Last appeared in 1994 ===
| Character | Actor(s) | Duration |
|---|---|---|
| Hattie Tavernier | Michelle Gayle | 1990–1994 |
| Hattie Tavernier | Uncredited | 1990–1994 |
| Etta Tavernier | Jacqui Gordon-Lawrence | 1990–1992, 1994 |
| Carmen | Amanda Holden | 1994 |
| Elizabeth Willmott-Brown | Helena Breck | 1994 |
| Dougie Briggs | Max Gold | 1994 |
| Richard Cole | Ian Reddington | 1992–1994 |
| Jackie Wallace | Ann Lynn | 1991, 1994 |
| Nadia Mitchell | Anna Barkan | 1993–1994 |
| Stanley Bridge | Godfrey Jackman | 1994 |
| Reg Simpson | Philip Manikum | 1994 |
| Shelley Lewis | Nicole Arumugam | 1992–1994 |

=== Last appeared in 1995 ===
| Character | Actor(s) | Duration |
|---|---|---|
| Della Alexander | Michelle Joseph | 1994–1995 |
| Binnie Roberts | Sophie Langham | 1994–1995 |
| Stan Dougan | Jack Chissick | 1994–1995 |
| Geoff Barnes | David Roper | 1994–1995 |
| Maxine Palmer | Dilys Laye | 1994–1995 |
| Liam Tyler | Francis Magee | 1993–1995 |

=== Last appeared in 1996 ===
| Character | Actor(s) | Duration |
|---|---|---|
| Meena McKenzie | Sudha Bhuchar | 1993–1994, 1996 |
| Steve Elliot | Mark Monero | 1991–1996 |
| Lydia | Marlaine Gordon | 1995–1996 |
| Kevin | John Pickard | 1993–1996 |
| Guppy Sharma | Lyndam Gregory | 1995–1996 |
| Reenie Branning | Joy Graham | 1996 |
| Willy Roper | Michael Tudor Barnes | 1995–1996 |
| Arthur Fowler | Bill Treacher | 1985–1996 |
| April Branning | Debbie Arnold | 1995–1996 |

=== Last appeared in 1997 ===
| Character | Actor(s) | Duration |
|---|---|---|
| Dan Zappieri | Carl Pizzie | 1996–1997 |
| Frankie Pierre | Syan Blake | 1996–1997 |
| Alistair Matthews | Neil Clark | 1996–1997 |
| Sue Taylor | Charlotte Bellamy | 1996–1997 |
| Felix Kawalski | Harry Landis | 1995–1997 |
| Ted Hills | Brian Croucher | 1995–1997 |
| Gerry McCrae | Simon O'Gorman | 1997 |
| Maggie Flaherty | Olivia Shanley | 1997 |
| Sean Flaherty | Pat Laffin | 1997 |
| Eamonn Flaherty | Maurice O'Donoghue | 1997 |
| Brenda Flaherty | Janet Behan | 1997 |
| Colette Flaherty | Shiona Redmond | 1997 |
| Eamonn Flaherty Jr. | Sean Walsh | 1997 |
| Vanessa Carlton | Adele Salem | 1997 |
| Lorraine Wicks | Jacqueline Leonard | 1996–1997 |
| Big Ron | Ron Tarr | 1985–1997 |
| Jacques Butcher | Jack Snell | 1994, 1997 |
| Jules Tavernier | Tommy Eytle | 1990–1997 |

=== Last appeared in 1998 ===
| Character | Actor(s) | Duration |
|---|---|---|
| Johnny Price | Mark Kingston | 1997–1998 |
| Brian Meade | Patrick Cremin | 1997–1998 |
| Max Townsend | Alan Hunter | 1997–1998 |
| Hayley Edwards | Karin Diamond | 1998 |
| Rob Hedges | Lee Whitlock | 1997–1998 |
| Eliot Saunders | Lawrence Lambert | 1998 |
| John Valecue | Steve Weston | 1996, 1998 |
| Nick Holland | Dominic Taylor | 1997–1998 |
| Ros Thorne | Clare Grogan | 1997–1998 |
| Nicole Moore | Sara Stephens | 1998 |
| Jessie Moore | Chelsey Paden | 1997–1998 |
| Alfie Kane | Mark Pegg | 1997–1998 |
| Lola Christie | Diane Parish | 1998 |
| Neelam Kapoor | Jamila Massey | 1997–1998 |
| Chris Clarke | Matthew Jay Lewis | 1997–1998 |
| Polly Becker | Victoria Gould | 1997–1998 |
| Sharmilla Kapoor | Priya Bilkhu | 1993–1998 |
| Sanjay Kapoor | Deepak Verma | 1993–1998 |
| Gita Kapoor | Shobu Kapoor | 1993–1998 |
| Luisa di Marco | Stella Tanner | 1998 |
| George Palmer | Paul Moriarty | 1996–1998 |
| Bruno di Marco | Leon Lissek | 1998 |

=== Last appeared in 1999 ===
| Character | Actor(s) | Duration |
|---|---|---|
| Tiffany Mitchell | Martine McCutcheon | 1995–1999 |
| Ruth Fowler | Caroline Paterson | 1994–1999 |
| Susan Rose | Tilly Vosburgh | 1997–1999 |
| Saskia Duncan | Deborah Sheridan-Taylor | 1998–1999 |
| Conor Flaherty | Seán Gleeson | 1997–1999 |
| Mary Flaherty | Melanie Clark Pullen | 1997–1999 |
| Carrie Swann | Holly Atkins | 1998–1999 |
| Simon Raymond | Andrew Lynford | 1996–1999 |
| Tony Hills | Mark Homer | 1995–1999 |
| Huw Edwards | Richard Elis | 1996–1999 |
| Louise Raymond | Carol Harrison | 1998–1999 |
| Annie Palmer | Nadia Sawalha | 1997–1999 |
| Lenny Wallace | Desune Coleman | 1996–1999 |
| Richard Crowe | Simon Thomson | 1997, 1999 |
| Bev Williams | Diane Langton | 1989–1990, 1998–1999 |
| Alex Healy | Richard Driscoll | 1997–1999 |
| Lilly Mattock | Barbara Keogh | 1998–1999 |
| Claudia Fielding | Romla Walker | 1999 |
| Charlie Mason | Campbell Morrison | 1996, 1998–1999 |
| Sarah Hills | Daniela Denby-Ashe | 1995–1999 |
| Enrico di Clemente | Francois Pandolfo | 1999 |
| Michael Rose | Russell Floyd | 1996–1999 |
| Troy Harvey | Jamie Jarvis | 1999 |
| Andrea Price | Cindy O'Callaghan | 1994–1995, 1999 |
| Susie Price | Viva Duce | 1999 |

== 2000s ==
=== Last appeared in 2000 ===
| Character | Actor(s) | Duration |
|---|---|---|
| Josie McFarlane | Joan Hooley | 1998–2000 |
| Matthew Rose | Joe Absolom | 1997–2000 |
| Fred Fonseca | Jimi Mistry | 1998–2000 |
| Maureen Carter | Diana Coupland | 2000 |
| Jackie Owen | Race Davies | 1999–2000 |
| Nina Harris | Troy Titus-Adams | 1999–2000 |
| Fiona Morris | Ashley Jensen | 2000 |
| Sophie Braddock | Hayley Angel Wardle | 2000 |
| Rod Morris | Forbes Masson | 2000 |
| Rosa di Marco | Louise Jameson | 1998–2000 |
| Gianni di Marco | Marc Bannerman | 1998–2000 |
| Teresa di Marco | Leila Birch | 1998–2000 |
| Nicky di Marco | Carly Hillman | 1998–2000 |
| Irene Raymond | Roberta Taylor | 1997–2000 |
| Jeff Healy | Leslie Schofield | 1997–2000 |
| Ethel Skinner | Gretchen Franklin | 1985–1997, 2000 |
| Nellie Ellis | Elizabeth Kelly | 1993–1998, 2000 |
| Kevin | Daniel Mays | 2000 |
| Danny Harrison | Eddie Osei | 2000 |
| Ameena Badawi | Shobna Gulati | 2000 |
| John Charrington | Jeremy Gittins | 2000 |

=== Last appeared in 2001 ===
| Character | Actor(s) | Duration |
|---|---|---|
| Eddie Skinner | Richard Vanstone | 2000–2001 |
| Kerry Skinner | Gemma McCluskie | 2000–2001 |
| Jack Robbins | Chook Sibtain | 2000–2001 |
| Sandra di Marco | Clare Wilkie | 2000–2001 |
| Ritchie Stringer | Gareth Hunt | 2001 |
| Diane Irving | Sheila Whitfield | 2001 |
| Ashley Cotton | Rossi Higgins | 1993, 2000–2001 |
| Ashley Cotton | Frankie Fitzgerald | 1993, 2000–2001 |
| Zoe Newton | Elizabeth Chadwick | 1993, 2000–2001 |
| Zoe Newton | Tara Ellis | 1993, 2000–2001 |
| Ross Fletcher | Che Walker | 2001 |
| Gary Bolton | Bruce Byron | 2001 |
| Dan Sullivan | Craig Fairbrass | 1999–2001 |
| Margaret Walker | Susan George | 2001 |
| Audrey Trueman | Corinne Skinner-Carter | 2000–2001 |
| John Davis | Huw Higginson | 2001 |
| Roxy Drake | Tracy Brabin | 2001 |

=== Last appeared in 2002 ===
| Character | Actor(s) | Duration |
|---|---|---|
| Jane Williams | Ann Mitchell | 2001–2002 |
| Mick McFarlane | Sylvester Williams | 1996–2002 |
| Kim McFarlane | Krystle Williams | 1998–2002 |
| Ernie Johnson | John Junkin | 2001–2002 |
| Steve Owen | Martin Kemp | 1998–2002 |
| Terry Raymond | Gavin Richards | 1996–2002 |
| Joe di Marco | Jake Kyprianou | 1998–2002 |
| Sue Miller | Victoria Willing | 2001–2002 |
| Neil Miller | Robin Sneller | 2002 |
| Nathan Williams | Doug Allen | 2001–2002 |
| Clare Butcher | Lucy Foxall | 1989, 2002 |
| Clare Butcher | Caroline O'Neill | 1989, 2002 |
| Beppe di Marco | Michael Greco | 1998–2002 |
| Angel Hudson | Clifford Price | 2001–2002 |
| Precious Hudson | Judi Shekoni | 2002 |
| Jason James | Joseph Millson | 2002 |
| Rebecca Hibbert | Paulette Williams | 2002 |
| Milton Hibbert | Jeffrey Kissoon | 2002 |
| Trevor Morgan | Alex Ferns | 2000–2002 |
| Tom Banks | Colm O'Maonlai | 2002 |
| Dave Roberts | David Kennedy | 2002 |
| Donna Andrews | Alison Senior | 2001–2002 |
| Donna Andrews | Paula Jennings | 2001–2002 |
| Sean Andrews | Victor and Harry Hunter | 2001–2002 |
| Sean Andrews | Oliver Bradley | 2001–2002 |
| Chris Wright | Tom Roberts | 2002 |
| Jamie Mitchell | Jack Ryder | 1998–2002 |

=== Last appeared in 2003 ===
| Character | Actor(s) | Duration |
|---|---|---|
| Dougie Slade | John Bowler | 2002–2003 |
| Mark Fowler | David Scarboro | 1985–1987, 1990–2003 |
| Mark Fowler | Todd Carty | 1985–1987, 1990–2003 |
| Anish Mistry | Ali Zahoor | 2002–2003 |
| Doris Moisey | Marcia Ashton | 2002–2003 |
| Roy Evans | Tony Caunter | 1994–2003 |
| Eleanor Trueman | Charnae Leckie | 2003 |
| Carl Bromley | Joe Rice | 2003 |
| Jack Dalton | Hywel Bennett | 2003 |
| Pushpa Ferreira | Madhur Jaffrey | 2003 |
| Joanne Ryan | Tara Lynne O'Neill | 2002–2003 |
| Geoff Morton | Maurice Roëves | 2003 |
| Jan Hammond | Jane How | 1986–1987, 2002–2003 |
| Asif Malik | Ashvin Luximon | 1999–2003 |
| Tony Jamison | Ben Cartwright | 2003 |
| Gavin Sharp | Steve Nicolson | 2003 |
| Victor Duke | Ben Thomas | 2003 |
| Liza Moon | Joanne Adams | 2003 |
| Edwin Caldecott | Ron Moody | 2003 |
| Paula Campbell | Mia Soteriou | 2003 |
| Maxwell Moon | Andrew Paul | 2003 |
| Mary Harkinson | Mary Woodvine | 2003 |
| Alex Harkinson | Ben Nealon | 2003 |
| Danny Harkinson | Josh Alexander | 2003 |
| Dan Ferreira | Dalip Tahil | 2003 |

=== Last appeared in 2004 ===
| Character | Actor(s) | Duration |
|---|---|---|
| Tony Macrae | Tam White | 2003–2004 |
| Dom Shaw | Lloyd McGuire | 2004 |
| Shirley Benson | Robyn Moore | 2003–2004 |
| JJ | Daniel Anthony | 2004 |
| Laura Beale | Hannah Waterman | 2000–2004 |
| Natalie Evans | Lucy Speed | 1994–1995, 1999–2004 |
| Jack Evans | Joseph and Samuel Timson | 2002–2004 |
| Wilfred Atkins | Dudley Sutton | 2004 |
| Kelly Taylor | Brooke Kinsella | 2001–2004 |
| Tom Stuart | Shaun Dooley | 2001–2004 |
| Sarah Cairns | Alison Pargeter | 2004 |
| Maude | Doreen Taylor | 2004 |
| Deirdre Foster | Patricia Brake | 2004 |
| Tommy Grant | Robert Cavanah | 2004 |
| Paul Trueman | Gary Beadle | 2001–2004 |
| David Collins | Dan Milne | 2004 |

=== Last appeared in 2005 ===
| Character | Actor(s) | Duration |
|---|---|---|
| Dominic Price | Paul Brennen | 2003–2005 |
| Spencer Moon | Christopher Parker | 2002–2005 |
| Kate Mitchell | Jill Halfpenny | 2002–2005 |
| Den Watts | Leslie Grantham | 1985–1989, 2003–2005 |
| Andy Hunter | Michael Higgs | 2003–2005 |
| Sasha Perkins | Jemma Walker | 2003–2005 |
| Adi Ferreira | Ameet Chana | 2003–2005 |
| Ash Ferreira | Raji James | 2003–2005 |
| Ronny Ferreira | Ray Panthaki | 2003–2005 |
| Kareena Ferreira | Pooja Shah | 2003–2005 |
| Tariq Laroussi | Nabil Elouahabi | 2003–2005 |
| Johnathon Leroy | Ivan Kaye | 2003–2005 |
| Michael Rawlins | Melvyn Hayes | 2005 |
| Ray Taylor | Dorian Lough | 2004–2005 |
| Leo Taylor | Philip Dowling | 2004–2005 |
| Trisha Taylor | Cathy Murphy | 2005 |
| Amanda Parry | Sarah Preston | 2005 |
| Tina Stewart | Charlotte Avery | 2005 |
| DI Riddick | Roger Griffiths | 2004–2005 |
| Sid | Trevor Peacock | 2005 |
| Frank Butcher | Mike Reid | 1987–2000, 2002, 2005 |
| Nana Moon | Hilda Braid | 2002–2005 |
| Dennis Rickman | Nigel Harman | 2003–2005 |

=== Last appeared in 2006 ===
| Character | Actor(s) | Duration |
|---|---|---|
| Amy | Nina Fry | 2005–2006 |
| Nora Swann | Pamela Cundell | 2005–2006 |
| Megan Macer | Niky Wardley | 2006 |
| Nico Pappas | Gerard Monaco | 2006 |
| Mike Swann | Mark Wingett | 2005–2006 |
| Danny Moon | Jake Maskall | 2004–2006 |
| Margaret Wilson | Janet Amsden | 2005–2006 |
| Briony Campbell | Rae Hendrie | 2006 |
| Oliver Cousins | Tom Ellis | 2006 |
| Little Mo Mitchell | Kacey Ainsworth | 2000–2006 |
| Ray | David Kennedy | 2006 |
| Carla Mitchell | Christianne Oliveira | 2006 |
| Clint | Huggy Leaver | 2004–2006 |
| Aleesha Miller | Freya and Phoebe Coltman-West | 2004–2006 |
| Demi Miller | Shana Swash | 2004–2006 |
| Rosie Miller | Gerry Cowper | 2004–2006 |
| Elaine Jarvis | Siân Reeves | 2006 |
| Juley Smith | Joseph Kpobie | 2002–2006 |
| Steve Clarke | Tom Bennett | 2006 |
| Al | Andrew McKay | 2006 |
| David Walsh | Jeremy Child | 2006 |
| Cedric Lucas | Ram John Holder | 2006 |
| Sid Clarke | Simon Gleeson | 2006 |
| SJ Fletcher | Natasha Beaumont | 2006 |
| Joy Lucas | Doña Croll | 2006 |
| Johnny Allen | Billy Murray | 2005–2006 |
| Aubrey Valentine | Joseph Marcell | 2006 |
| Victor Brown | Jimmy Yuill | 2006 |
| Caroline Bishop | Una Stubbs | 2006 |
| Jack Edwards | Nicky Henson | 2006 |
| Evie Brown | Marji Campi | 2006 |
| Bryan Nolan | Mark Springer | 2006 |
| Pauline Fowler | Wendy Richard | 1985–2006 |

=== Last appeared in 2007 ===
| Character | Actor(s) | Duration |
|---|---|---|
| Joe Macer | Ray Brooks | 2005–2007 |
| Lydia Asler | Amy Noble | 2006–2007 |
| Jez Franks | Tex Jacks | 2006–2007 |
| Anya Covalenco | Olga Fedori | 2007 |
| Naomi Julien | Petra Letang | 2005–2007 |
| Verity Wright | Amanda Ryan | 2007 |
| Warren Stamp | Will Mellor | 2007 |
| Tomas Covalenco | Dylan and Tyler Woolf | 2007 |
| Erek | Goran Kostić | 2007 |
| Rob Minter | Stuart Laing | 2006–2007 |
| Tony Andrews | Alan McKenna | 2006–2007 |
| Li Chong | Elaine Tan | 2006–2007 |
| Marco Bianco | Bart Ruspoli | 2007 |
| Stella Crawford | Sophie Thompson | 2006–2007 |
| Zachary Carson | Jonah Russell | 2007 |
| Len Harker | Christopher Ellison | 2007 |
| Ellen Dunn | Phillipa Peak | 2007 |
| Craig Dixon | Rory Jennings | 2007 |
| Brendan Hughes | Tim Hudson | 2007 |
| Damian | James Hillier | 2007 |
| Dee | Steve Chaplin | 2007 |
| Manju Patel | Leena Dhingra | 2007 |

=== Last appeared in 2008 ===
| Character | Actor(s) | Duration |
|---|---|---|
| Kevin Wicks | Phil Daniels | 2006–2008 |
| Preeti Choraria | Babita Pohoomull | 2006–2008 |
| Ashley Jennings | Tony Boncza | 2008 |
| Tegs Teague | Ben Smith | 2008 |
| Selina Branning | Daisy Beaumont | 2008 |
| Roger Grant | Max Gold | 2008 |
| Edward Tunstall | Miles Anderson | 2008 |
| Norman | David Schaal | 2007–2008 |
| Harriet Burgess | Lucy Robinson | 2008 |
| Jalil Iqbal | Jan Uddin | 2008 |
| Melinda | Siobhan Hayes | 2008 |
| Opal Smith | Rustie Lee | 2008 |
| Alice Grayling | Susannah Wise | 2008 |
| Queenie Trott | Judy Cornwell | 2007–2008 |
| Hazel Hobbs | Kika Mirylees | 2007–2008 |
| Marni Merrick | Lisa Ellis | 2008 |
| Keisha | Suzie McGrath | 2008 |
| Gus Smith | Mohammed George | 2002–2008 |
| Jill Green | Elizabeth Rider | 2004, 2007–2008 |
| Piers | Simon Delaney | 2008 |
| Maggie Townsend | Angeline Ball | 2008 |
| May Wright | Amanda Drew | 2006–2008 |
| Bernadette Logan | Olivia Grant | 2007–2008 |
| Keith Miller | David Spinx | 2004–2008 |
| Ted | Richard Hope | 2008 |
| Corky (parrot) | Uncredited | 2005–2008 |
| Wellard (dog) | Chancer | 1994–2008 |
| Wellard (dog) | Zenna | 1994–2008 |
| Wellard (dog) | Kyte | 1994–2008 |
| Olly Greenwood | Bart Edwards | 2008 |
| Jase Dyer | Stephen Lord | 2007–2008 |
| Lee Thompson | Carl Ferguson | 2008 |
| Amir Khan | Alton Letto | 2008 |
| Stuart Turner | Ray MacAllan | 2008 |
| Vinnie Monks | Bobby Davro | 2007–2008 |
| Ahmet | Tamer Hassan | 2008 |
| Suzy Branning | Julie Christian-Young | 1996, 2008 |
| Suzy Branning | Maggie O'Neill | 1996, 2008 |

=== Last appeared in 2009 ===
| Character | Actor(s) | Duration |
|---|---|---|
| Marissa Moore | Finn Atkins | 2009 |
| Roger Clarke | Geoffrey Hutchings | 2009 |
| Pearl Rogers | Su Elliot | 2009 |
| Callum Monks | Elliott Jordan | 2008–2009 |
| Paul | Jack Gordon | 2008–2009 |
| Danielle Jones | Lauren Crace | 2008–2009 |
| Kendra Hills-Smythe | Rebecca Egan | 2008–2009 |
| Tommy Clifford | Edward Woodward | 2009 |
| Poppy Merritt | Amy Darcy | 2008–2009 |
| Dermot | Scott Mean | 2007, 2009 |
| Bird Meadows | Brett Fancy | 2007, 2009 |
| Terry Bates | Nicholas Ball | 2007–2009 |
| Parveen Abbasi | Farzana Dua Elahe | 2009 |
| Theo Kelly | Rolan Bell | 2009 |
| Ellis Prince | Michael Obiora | 2009 |
| Jamie Stewart | Edward MacLiam | 2007–2009 |
| Debra Dean | Ruth Gemmell | 2009 |
| Andonis Papadopolous | Lee Warner | 1992, 1994, 2009 |
| Andonis Papadopolous | Uncredited | 1992, 1994, 2009 |
| Brenda Boyle | Carmel Cryan | 2008–2009 |
| Stephanie Reynolds | Claire Lubert | 2009 |
| Don | Geoff Leesley | 2009 |
| Summer Swann | Daisy Fitter | 2007–2009 |
| Summer Swann | Abbie Hackworth | 2007–2009 |
| Summer Swann | Harry Swash | 2007–2009 |
| Summer Swann | Isabella and Rebecca Hegarty | 2007–2009 |
| Dawn Swann | Kara Tointon | 2005–2009 |
| Trina Johnson | Sharon Duncan-Brewster | 2009 |
| Orlenda | Mary Tamm | 2009 |
| PC Young | Lu Corfield | 2009 |
| DS Grimwood | Steve Hansell | 2007–2009 |
| James Mackie | Paul Keating | 2009 |
| Joel Reynolds | Cavan Clerkin | 2009 |
| Charity Kase | Morgan Crowley | 2007, 2009 |
| Owen Turner | Lee Ross | 2006, 2009 |
| Dexter Mulholland | Robbie Gee | 2009 |
| Noah Chambers | Micah Thomas | 2009 |
| Syd Chambers | Nina Toussaint-White | 2009 |
| Isaacs | Tony Pritchard | 2009 |
| Louise Hills | Adie Allen | 2008–2009 |
| Mrs Taylor | Jacqueline Defferary | 2009 |
| Vivien Easley QC | Geraldine Alexander | 2009 |
| Tony King | Chris Coghill | 2008–2009 |
| PC Adams | Andrew Watson | 2008–2009 |
| Myra Sim | Naomi Ryan | 2007, 2009 |
| Terence (dog) | Terence | 2001–2009 |
| Terence (dog) | Uncredited | 2001–2009 |

== 2010s ==
=== Last appeared in 2010 ===
| Character | Actor(s) | Duration |
|---|---|---|
| Nichola Theobald | Bev | 2010 |
| Jamila Inzamam | Sara Aisha Kent | 2008, 2010 |
| Ali Inzamam | Omar Kent | 2008, 2010 |
| Inzamam Ahmed | Paul Bhattacharjee | 2008, 2010 |
| Al Jenkins | Adam Croasdell | 2009–2010 |
| Todd Taylor | Ashley Kumar | 2009–2010 |
| Manda Best | Josie Lawrence | 2009–2010 |
| Wayne Hughes | Jamie Treacher | 2007–2010 |
| Bradley Branning | Charlie Clements | 2006–2010 |
| Rachel Branning | Sukie Smith | 2006–2010 |
| Rachel Branning | Pooky Quesnel | 2006–2010 |
| Kylie | Elarica Gallacher | 2010 |
| Andy Henderson | Jem Wall | 2007–2010 |
| Tasha | Charlotte Beaumont | 2010 |
| Mr Steele | Simon Wilson | 2010 |
| Shona Blake | Catherine Bailey | 2007–2010 |
| Harvey Freeman | Martin Jarvis | 2010 |
| Jade | Niamh Webb | 2010 |
| Allen Conlon | Peter Vollebregt | 2010 |
| DI Kelly | Ian Burfield | 2007–2008, 2010 |
| Adam Best | David Proud | 2009–2010 |
| Olive Woodhouse | Sylvia Syms | 2007, 2009–2010 |
| Liz Turner | Kate Williams | 2006, 2009–2010 |
| Ken Tate | Peter Blake | 2010 |
| Mr Allcock | Bill Buckhurst | 2010 |
| Tamsin Reilly | Ruth Keeling | 2010 |
| Becca Swanson | Simone James | 2009–2010 |
| Nurse Denton | Elicia Daly | 2010 |
| Zsa Zsa Carter | Emer Kenny | 2010 |
| Leon Small | Sam Attwater | 2010 |
| Lewis Daley | Deka Walmsley | 2010 |
| Billie Jackson | Bluey Robinson | 1993–1997, 2004, 2010 |
| Billie Jackson | Devon Anderson | 1993–1997, 2004, 2010 |
| Mitch Gannon | Theo Barklem-Biggs | 2010 |
| Kai Jackson | Shay Spencer | 2010 |
| Blossom Jackson | Mona Hammond | 1994–1997, 2010 |
| Alan Jackson | Howard Antony | 1993–1997, 2010 |
| Ina Foot | Ina Clare | 2010 |

=== Last appeared in 2011 ===
| Character | Actor(s) | Duration |
|---|---|---|
| Martina Quinn | Tamara Wall | 2011 |
| Connor Stanley | Arinze Kene | 2010–2011 |
| PC Lance | Giles New | 2006, 2008–2011 |
| Martin | Alasdair Harvey | 2011 |
| Nathan Clayton | Sam Melvin | 2011 |
| Marta Demboski | Magdalena Kurek | 2011 |
| Edward Bishop | Frank Barrie | 2010–2011 |
| Jim Branning | John Bardon | 1996, 1999–2011 |
| Ashley Chubb | Colin Mace | 2011 |
| Lydia Simmonds | Margaret Tyzack | 2011 |
| Lydia Simmonds | Heather Chasen | 2011 |
| Shameem | Seeta Indrani | 2011 |
| Mercy Olubunmi | Bunmi Mojekwu | 2010–2011 |
| Julie Perkins | Cathy Murphy | 2010–2011 |
| Cheryl Matthews | Heather Craney | 2011 |
| Rob Grayson | Jody Latham | 2011 |
| Lee | Mitchell Hunt | 2011 |
| Harry Gold | Linal Haft | 2010–2011 |
| Darren Miller | Charlie G. Hawkins | 2004–2011 |
| Grace Olubunmi | Ellen Thomas | 2010–2011 |
| Faith Olubunmi | Modupe Adeyeye | 2011 |
| Duncan Willis | Steven France | 2011 |
| Vanessa Gold | Zöe Lucker | 2010–2011 |
| Craig Moon | Elliot Rosen | 2011 |
| Eddie Moon | David Essex | 2011 |
| Mark Garland | Chris Simmons | 2011 |
| Greg Jessop | Stefan Booth | 2010–2011 |
| Jodie Gold | Kylie Babbington | 2010–2011 |
| Sam | Babatunde Aleshe | 2011 |
| Yusef Khan | Ace Bhatti | 2010–2011 |
| Tariq | Antony Bunsee | 2011 |

=== Last appeared in 2012 ===
| Character | Actor(s) | Duration |
|---|---|---|
| Norman Simmonds | George Layton | 2011–2012 |
| Qadim Shah | Ramon Tikaram | 2009–2012 |
| Simon Wicks | Nick Berry | 1985–1990, 2012 |
| Gethin Williams | Bradley Freegard | 2012 |
| Sophie | Jane Cameron | 2011–2012 |
| Maria de Costa | Judy Browne | 2008–2010, 2012 |
| Lorraine Stevens | Linda Henry | 1991–1992, 2012 |
| Lorraine Stevens | Victoria Alcock | 1991–1992, 2012 |
| Mandy Salter | Nicola Stapleton | 1992–1994, 2011–2012 |
| Zulekha Abbasi | Lisa Shah | 2009–2012 |
| Afia Masood | Meryl Fernandes | 2009–2012 |
| Diane Butcher | Sophie Lawrence | 1988–1991, 1993–1994, 1997, 2008, 2012 |
| Rob | Thomas Snowdon | 2012 |
| Hannah | Leila Crerar | 2012 |
| Rose Cotton | Polly Perkins | 2011–2012 |
| Shenice Quinn | Lily Harvey | 2011–2012 |
| Helen/Hayley Roberts | Martine Brown | 2011–2012 |
| John Hewland | Jesse Birdsall | 2012 |
| Sasha Dixon | Rebecca Sanneh | 2012 |
| DS Luke Crisp | Rufus Wright | 2012 |
| Nico Papadopoulos | Aykut Hilmi | 2012 |
| Andrew Cotton | Ricky Grover | 2011–2012 |
| Anthony Moon | Matt Lapinskas | 2011–2012 |
| Pete | Jason Riddington | 2012 |
| Jimmy | Ryan | 2012 |
| Carly Wicks | Kellie Shirley | 2006–2008, 2012 |
| Lisa | Marianne Benedict | 2012 |
| Chantelle | Kelsey Hardwick | 2012 |
| Amira Masood | Preeya Kalidas | 2009–2012 |
| Jackie Bosch | Frances Lima | 2012 |
| Syed Masood | Marc Elliott | 2009–2012 |
| Tansy Meadow | Daisy Wood-Davis | 2012 |
| Derek Branning | Jamie Foreman | 1996, 2011–2012 |
| Derek Branning | Terence Beesley | 1996, 2011–2012 |

=== Last appeared in 2013 ===
| Character | Actor(s) | Duration |
|---|---|---|
| Zainab Masood | Nina Wadia | 2007–2013 |
| PC Ali Psyk | Yvonne Dodoo | 2011–2013 |
| Nurse Green | Tala Gouveia | 2011–2013 |
| Ayesha Rana | Shivani Ghai | 2012–2013 |
| Alexa Smith | Saffron Coomber | 2012–2013 |
| Tayo | Youssef Berouain | 2013 |
| Ali | Leanne Dunstan | 2013 |
| Renzo | Chase Willoughby | 2013 |
| Little Chris | Rizwan Shebani | 2013 |
| Steve Lowe | Michael Simkins | 2013 |
| Kane | Harry Rafferty | 2013 |
| Josef | Aleksandar Mikic | 2013 |
| Ray Dixon | Chucky Venn | 2012–2013 |
| Sergeant Lewis | Andy Greenhalgh | 2007, 2009–2010, 2012–2013 |
| Norman Pike | Timothy Bentinck | 2013 |
| Albert | Huw Parmenter | 2013 |
| Betty Spragg | Tessa Wyatt | 2013 |
| Tyler Moon | Tony Discipline | 2011–2013 |
| Kitty | Chloe May-Cuthill | 2013 |
| Tara | Liz May Brice | 2013 |
| Naomi | Lisa Maxwell | 2013 |
| Michael Moon | Steve John Shepherd | 2010–2013 |
| Laura Seddon | Nathalie Buscombe | 2013 |
| Sam James | Cornell John | 2013 |
| Ava Hartman | Clare Perkins | 2012–2013 |
| Alice Branning | Jasmyn Banks | 2012–2013 |
| Joey Branning | David Witts | 2012–2013 |

=== Last appeared in 2014 ===
| Character | Actor(s) | Duration |
|---|---|---|
| Carl White | Daniel Coonan | 2013–2014 |
| Kirsty Branning | Kierston Wareing | 2012–2014 |
| AJ Ahmed | Phaldut Sharma | 2012–2014 |
| Gaynor Lucas | Kathleen Frazer | 2007–2014 |
| Bella Stone | Isobelle Molloy | 2013–2014 |
| Sadie Young | Kate Magowan | 2013–2014 |
| Wayne Ladlow | Malachi Kirby | 2014 |
| Poppy Meadow | Rachel Bright | 2011–2014 |
| Danny Pennant | Gary Lucy | 2012–2014 |
| Luke Riley | Matt Willis | 2014 |
| Nora White | Lynn Farleigh | 2013–2014 |
| Adam White | Ben Wigzell | 2012–2014 |
| Gina Williams | Nicola Cowper | 1998–1999, 2007, 2014 |
| Yasmin Masood | Uncredited | 2011–2012, 2014 |
| DS Holt | Shaun Prendergast | 2014 |
| Nikki Spraggan | Rachel Wilde | 2013–2014 |
| George Trott | Joshua Jacobs | 2009–2012, 2014 |
| George Trott | Harrison Stagg | 2009–2012, 2014 |
| Gianluca Cavallo | Gabriele Lombardo | 2014 |
| Chris Skinner | Mark Letheren | 2014 |
| Rosie Spraggan | Jerzey Swingler | 2013–2014 |
| Tosh Mackintosh | Rebecca Scroggs | 2014 |

=== Last appeared in 2015 ===
| Character | Actor(s) | Duration |
|---|---|---|
| Nurse Beth | Johanne Murdock | 2014–2015 |
| Emma Summerhayes | Anna Acton | 2014–2015 |
| Dexter Hartman | Khali Best | 2013–2015 |
| DS Adrian Bain | Joe Tucker | 2011–2015 |
| Anthony Heathcote | Jack Pierce | 2010, 2012, 2015 |
| Nick Cotton | John Altman | 1985–1991, 1993, 1998, 2000–2001, 2008–2009, 2014–2015 |
| Jake Stone | Jamie Lomas | 2013–2015 |
| Tramp (dog) | Duffie | 2013–2015 |
| Nurse Annabel | Lisa Greenwood | 2012–2013, 2015 |
| Kristopher Hanley | Uncredited | 1990, 2015 |
| Kristopher Hanley | Jonathan Broadbent | 1990, 2015 |
| Cyril Bishop | Andrew Sachs | 2015 |
| Stan Carter | Timothy West | 2014–2015 |
| Ineta Shirovs | Octavia Alexandru | 2014–2015 |
| Ineta Shirovs | Gledisa Osmani | 2014–2015 |
| Marta Shirovs | Noeleen Comiskey | 2014–2015 |
| Aleks Shirovs | Kristian Kiehling | 2014–2015 |
| Sandra Dinsdale | Donna Combe | 2014–2015 |
| Margaret Badini | Kim Vithana | 2015 |
| Karin Smart | Denise van Outen | 2015 |
| Yvonne Cotton | Pauline McLynn | 2014–2015 |
| St. John Redmond | William Gaunt | 2015 |
| Adrian Quinlan | Ben Turner | 2015 |
| Helen Stritch | Jaye Griffiths | 2015 |
| Fat Elvis | Shenton Dixon | 2015 |
| Asim Hussain | Nitin Kundra | 2015 |
| Beth Williams | Uncredited | 2014–2015 |
| Terry Spraggan | Terry Alderton | 2013–2015 |
| Jonathan Malnet | James Barriscale | 2015 |
| Bushra Abbasi | Pooja Ghai | 2009–2011, 2014–2015 |
| Frank Cavendish | Simon Hepworth | 2014–2015 |
| Arsim Kelmendi | Tomasz Aleksander | 2014–2015 |
| Alan Daniels | Garry Roost | 2008, 2015 |
| Cindy Williams | Ella Wortley | 1998–1999, 2007, 2013–2015 |
| Cindy Williams | Cydney Parker | 1998–1999, 2007, 2013–2015 |
| Cindy Williams | Eva Sayer | 1998–1999, 2007, 2013–2015 |
| Cindy Williams | Mimi Keene | 1998–1999, 2007, 2013–2015 |
| Adam Wallace | Jamie Maclachlan | 2015 |
| Hazel Warren | Clare Higgins | 2015 |
| Marcus Christie | Stephen Churchett | 1990–1991, 1993, 1996–2004, 2014–2015 |
| Wellard II (dog) | Panther | 2015 |
| Carol Jackson | Lindsey Coulson | 1993–1997, 1999, 2010–2015 |
| Jason Adams | Scott Neal | 2015 |
| Rosemary Kerr | Jessica Guise | 2015 |
| Jill Marsden | Sophie Stanton | 2001–2003, 2009–2010, 2012, 2015 |
| Fatima Inzamam | Anu Hasan | 2010, 2015 |
| Imam Ali | Emilio Doorgasingh | 2009–2011, 2015 |
| Craig Pike | Charles De'Ath | 2015 |

=== Last appeared in 2016 ===
| Character | Actor(s) | Duration |
|---|---|---|
| Sister Judith | Sandy McDade | 2015–2016 |
| Sister Ruth | June Whitfield | 2015–2016 |
| Ricksy Hicks | Joel Phillimore | 2016 |
| Shabnam Masood | Zahra Ahmadi | 2007–2008, 2014–2016 |
| Shabnam Masood | Rakhee Thakrar | 2007–2008, 2014–2016 |
| Scott Beckley | Richard Hurst | 2013–2016 |
| Delia Forde | Carolyn Pickles | 2016 |
| Eve Igwe | Emmanuella Cole | 2016 |
| Jordan Johnson | Michael-Joel David Stuart | 2008–2010, 2016 |
| Jordan Johnson | Joivan Wade | 2008–2010, 2016 |
| JJ Johnson | Zayden Kareem | 2016 |
| Anya Barowski | Jade Williams | 2016 |
| Lorna Cartwright | Janet Dibley | 1997–1998, 2016 |
| Tamwar Masood | Himesh Patel | 2007–2016 |
| PC Vanessa Jenkins | Caroline Faber | 2015–2016 |
| Thelma Bragg | Lorraine Stanley | 2016 |
| Sophie Dodd | Poppy Rush | 2016 |
| Alison Slater | Denise Welch | 2016 |
| Hannah Reynolds | Eloise Barnes | 2009, 2016 |
| Hannah Reynolds | Mia Jenkins | 2009, 2016 |
| Tim Reynolds | Charlie Baker | 2016 |
| Linford Short | Leon Lopez | 2016 |
| Christian Clarke | John Partridge | 2008–2012, 2014–2016 |
| Linda Clarke | Lynda Baron | 2006, 2008–2009, 2016 |
| Neville Peacock | Gary Webster | 2016 |
| Cameron Bryant | Glen Wallace | 2014–2016 |
| Sandra Vole | Badria Timimi | 2016 |
| Nurse Rowan Kennedy | Natasha Williams | 2004, 2008–2011, 2016 |
| Margaret Midhurst | Jan Harvey | 2015–2016 |
| Gavin Sullivan | Paul Nicholas | 2015–2016 |
| Jenny Rawlinson | Amy Marston | 2016 |
| Andy Jones | Aneirin Hughes | 2009, 2016 |
| Andy Flynn | Jack Derges | 2016 |
| Paul Coker | Jonny Labey | 2015–2016 |
| Courtney Mitchell | Carissa and Josephine O'Meara | 1997–1999, 2006, 2016 |
| Courtney Mitchell | Megan Jossa | 1997–1999, 2006, 2016 |
| Courtney Mitchell | Alice Nokes | 1997–1999, 2006, 2016 |
| Michael | Michael Leader | 1985–2016 |
| Buster Briggs | Karl Howman | 2014–2016 |
| Judge Anthony Abego | Jeffery Kissoon | 2015–2016 |
| Tom Eden | Tom Holloway | 2016 |
| Neil Crossley | Chris Waller | 2016 |
| Frankie Byrne | Leon Tennant | 2016 |
| DC Angie Rice | Martina Laird | 2016 |
| Les Coker | Roger Sloman | 2012, 2014–2016 |
| Claudette Hubbard | Ellen Thomas | 2015–2016 |
| Suzanne Parker | Beatrice Curnew | 2012, 2014, 2016 |
| Morgan Butcher | Devon Higgs | 2008–2014, 2016 |
| Mike Rendon | Bailey Patrick | 2016 |
| Kamil Masood | Arian Chikhlia | 2010–2013, 2015–2016 |
| Kyle Slater | Riley Carter Millington | 2015–2016 |
| Geraldine Clough | Gwyneth Strong | 2016 |
| Simon Ackroyd | Alex Avery | 2008–2009, 2014, 2016 |
| Derek Evans | Simon Lowe | 2007–2010, 2015–2016 |
| Heather Trott | Cheryl Fergison | 2007–2012, 2016 |
| Dermot Haynes | Geoffrey Newland | 2016 |
| Haroon Zaman | Silas Carson | 2016 |
| Karen Beckworth | Sally Rogers | 2016 |

=== Last appeared in 2017 ===
| Character | Actor(s) | Duration |
|---|---|---|
| Oz Bolat | Noah Maxwell-Clarke | 2016–2017 |
| Aunt Sal | Anna Karen | 1996–1997, 2001–2004, 2007–2011, 2013–2017 |
| Danny Mitchell | Liam Bergin | 2010, 2016–2017 |
| Colin McWerther | Robert Hands | 2015, 2017 |
| Tom Pepper | Tristam Summers | 2014–2017 |
| Emerald Fox | Doña Croll | 2017 |
| Babe Smith | Annette Badland | 2014–2017 |
| Trish Barnes | Tessa Churchard | 2012–2013, 2017 |
| Harry Beckett | Mark Bagnall | 2016–2017 |
| Linzi Bragg | Amy-Leigh Hickman | 2016–2017 |
| Tommy | Jordan Coulson | 2017 |
| Debbie Frith | Hestor Ruoff | 2015–2017 |
| Sylvie Carter | Linda Marlowe | 2014–2017 |
| Preston Cooper | Martin Anzor | 2017 |
| Konrad Topolski | Piotr Baumann | 2017 |
| Jimmie Broome | Samuel James | 2011–2012, 2017 |
| Corrine Mandel | Laura Rogers | 2017 |
| Dr Natasha Black | Rachel Bavidge | 2015–2017 |
| Madison Drake | Seraphina Beh | 2017 |
| Alexandra D'Costa | Sydney Craven | 2017 |
| Derek Harkinson | Ian Lavender | 2001–2005, 2016–2017 |
| PC Jaz Jones | Charlie De Melo | 2017 |
| PC Julian Walsh | Luke Williams | 2015–2017 |
| Jørgen Christensen | Christopher Dane | 2016–2017 |
| Bert Atkinson | Dave Hill | 2006–2007, 2017 |
| PC Teresa Ndiaye | Amelia Donkor | 2012, 2015, 2017 |
| Nurse Nina Barrett | Sarah Hoare | 2015, 2017 |
| Steven Beale | Edward Farrell | 1989–1990, 1992–2002, 2007–2008, 2016–2017 |
| Steven Beale | Stuart Stevens | 1989–1990, 1992–2002, 2007–2008, 2016–2017 |
| Steven Beale | Edward Savage | 1989–1990, 1992–2002, 2007–2008, 2016–2017 |
| Steven Beale | Aaron Sidwell | 1989–1990, 1992–2002, 2007–2008, 2016–2017 |
| Dr Alex Burham | Joanna Bending | 2013, 2015, 2017 |
| DC Jim Glover | Justin Pierre | 2015, 2017 |
| Dr Webster | Andrew Lewis | 2017 |
| The Reverend George Stevens | Michael Keating | 2005–2013, 2015–2017 |
| Fiona Payne | Sandra James-Young | 2014–2015, 2017 |
| Travis Law-Hughes | Alex James-Phelps | 2017 |
| Tom Bailey | Daniel Casey | 2017 |
| Gethin Pryce | Cerith Flinn | 2017 |
| Moose | Sam Gittins | 2016–2017 |
| Luke Browning | Henry Povey | 1987, 1992, 2017 |
| Luke Browning | Uncredited | 1987, 1992, 2017 |
| Luke Browning | Adam Astill | 1987, 1992, 2017 |
| Matthew Mitchell Cotton | Uncredited | 2015–2017 |
| Charlie Cotton | Declan Bennett | 2014–2015, 2017 |
| Felix Moore | George Maguire | 2017 |
| PC Evans | Adam McNamara | 2011–2015, 2017 |
| Benjamin Kresge | Matthew Ashforde | 2014–2015, 2017 |
| Hugo Browning | Simon Williams | 2017 |
| Fi Browning | Natasha Knight | 1987, 1992, 2017 |
| Fi Browning | Lisa Faulkner | 1987, 1992, 2017 |
| James Willmott-Brown | William Boyde | 1986–1989, 1992, 2017 |

=== Last appeared in 2018 ===
| Character | Actor(s) | Duration |
|---|---|---|
| TJ Spraggan | George Sargeant | 2013–2014, 2018 |
| Dr Harding | Nick Waring | 2017–2018 |
| Abi Branning | Lorna Fitzgerald | 2006–2018 |
| Ciara Maguire | Denise McCormack | 2018 |
| Dan | Ifan Meredith | 2018 |
| Tanya Branning | Jo Joyner | 2006–2013, 2015, 2017–2018 |
| Josh Hemmings | Eddie Eyre | 2017–2018 |
| Magic Marv | Steve Steen | 2018 |
| Georgi | Holly Donovan | 2018 |
| Savannah Sweeting | Georgina Redhead | 2018 |
| Cal | Jesse Rutherford | 2018 |
| Robert | Orli Shuka | 2018 |
| Aidan Maguire | Patrick Bergin | 2017–2018 |
| Mrs Robyn Lund | Polly Highton | 2017–2018 |
| Joyce Murray | Maggie Steed | 2017–2018 |
| Judith Thompson | Emma Fielding | 2018 |
| DC Stephan Franklin | Tim Dantay | 2015, 2018 |
| Michelle Fowler | Susan Tully | 1985–1995, 2016–2018 |
| Michelle Fowler | Jenna Russell | 1985–1995, 2016–2018 |
| Vincent Hubbard | Richard Blackwood | 2015–2018 |
| Viktoria | Cathy Walker | 2018 |
| Bijan | Jonas Khan | 2018 |
| Henry | Andrew Alexander | 2018 |
| Ingrid Solberg | Pernille Broch | 2017–2018 |
| Brianna | Rina Diamond | 2018 |
| DS Jennifer Adney | Joanna Miller | 2017–2018 |
| Shakil Kazemi | Shaheen Jafargholi | 2016–2018 |
| Zayan Scott | Alex Blake | 2017–2018 |
| PC Gregg Preston | Matt Slack | 2014, 2017–2018 |
| Agnes Novak | Margaréta Szabó | 2016–2018 |
| DCI Alsworth | Nik Drake | 2017–2018 |
| Woody Woodward | Lee Ryan | 2017–2018 |
| Amal Hussain | Natasha Jayetileke | 2018 |
| Ollie Walters | Tony O'Callaghan | 2013–2016, 2018 |
| Joan Murfield | Eileen Davies | 2017–2018 |
| Darius Kazemi | Ash Rizi | 2018 |
| Umar Kazemi | Selva Rasalingam | 2018 |
| Donna Yates | Lisa Hammond | 2014–2018 |
| Marky | Niall O'Mara | 2018 |
| Jessica Jones | Tara Lee | 2018 |
| Dan | Emeson Nwolie | 2018 |
| Bob Matthews | James Bowers | 2018 |
| Zara Highway | Faye Daveney | 2018 |
| Fraser Philips | Joseph Alessi | 2018 |
| Harley | Uncredited | 2018 |
| Chloe | Lauren Fitzpatrick | 2018 |
| DI Ellie Kent | Polly Maberly | 2017–2018 |
| Carmel Kazemi | Bonnie Langford | 2015–2018 |
| Hilary Taylor | Sadie Shimmin | 2015–2016, 2018 |
| Jagger Rawley | Aaron Thomas Ward | 2018 |
| Glenn Neyland | Todd Von Joel | 2018 |
| Morag Morgan | Julia Hills | 2018 |
| Kandice Taylor | Hannah Spearritt | 2017–2018 |

=== Last appeared in 2019 ===
| Character | Actor(s) | Duration |
|---|---|---|
| Ray Kelly | Sean Mahon | 2018–2019 |
| Bev Slater | Ashley McGuire | 2018–2019 |
| Nicola Kelly | Alexandra Gilbreath | 2018–2019 |
| Maddie Wright | Robyn Page | 2018–2019 |
| Hayley Slater | Katie Jarvis | 2018–2019 |
| Harold Legg | Leonard Fenton | 1985–1997, 2000, 2004, 2007, 2018–2019 |
| Masood Ahmed | Nitin Ganatra | 2007–2019 |
| Annie Smith | Zara Posener | 1985–1988, 2019 |
| Annie Smith | Jenna Alembick | 1985–1988, 2019 |
| Annie Smith | Samantha Crown | 1985–1988, 2019 |
| Annie Smith | Marilyn O'Brien | 1985–1988, 2019 |
| Evie Steele | Sophia Capasso | 2018–2019 |
| Matt Clarkson | Mitchell Hunt | 2018–2019 |
| Ross Swinden | Ossian Luke | 2018–2019 |
| Judge Davies | Robert Benfield | 2019 |
| Sarah Jones | Clara Indrani | 2019 |
| Gareth Woodington | Timothy Bentinck | 2019 |
| Laura | Elinor Lawless | 2019 |
| Claire Amartey | Eva Fontaine | 2019 |
| Stix Redman | Kasey McKellar | 2018–2019 |
| Midge | Tom Colley | 2019 |
| Dinah Wilson | Anjela Lauren Smith | 2019 |
| Brooke | Ria Lopez | 2019 |
| Sami Jackson | Shiven Shankar | 2015, 2019 |
| Nita Mistry | Bindya Solanki | 2001–2003, 2019 |
| DCI Morgan | Hannah Daniel | 2019 |
| Shyanna | Anita Harris | 2019 |
| Robbie Jackson | Dean Gaffney | 1993–2004, 2010, 2015, 2017–2019 |
| Wanda Baptiste | Anni Domingo | 2019 |
| Ted Murray | Christopher Timothy | 2017–2019 |
| Freda | Leila Hoffman | 2017, 2019 |
| Viv Bates | Dido Miles | 2009, 2019 |
| Fred Cole | Victor Gardener | 2016–2017, 2019 |
| Daisy | Amelie Smith | 2018–2019 |
| Ashley | Ashley Cook | 2018–2019 |
| Arshad Ahmed | Madhav Sharma | 2018–2019 |
| Mariam Ahmed | Indira Joshi | 2018–2019 |
| Hunter Owen | Charlie Winter | 2018–2019 |
| Mel Owen | Tamzin Outhwaite | 1998–2002, 2018–2019 |
| Adam Bateman | Stephen Rahman-Hughes | 2018–2019 |
| Charlie "Tubbs" Savage | Tayla Kovacevic-Ebong | 2019 |

== 2020s ==
=== Last appeared in 2020 ===
| Character | Actor(s) | Duration |
|---|---|---|
| Dot Cotton | June Brown | 1985–1993, 1997–2020 |
| Louise Mitchell | Rachel Cox | 2001–2003, 2008, 2010, 2016–2020 |
| Louise Mitchell | Danni Bennatar | 2001–2003, 2008, 2010, 2016–2020 |
| Louise Mitchell | Brittany Papple | 2001–2003, 2008, 2010, 2016–2020 |
| Louise Mitchell | Tilly Keeper | 2001–2003, 2008, 2010, 2016–2020 |
| Caroline Gardner | Laura Stevely | 2019–2020 |
| Lucy Beale | Eva Brittin-Snell | 1993–2010, 2012–2015, 2019–2020 |
| Lucy Beale | Casey Anne Rothery | 1993–2010, 2012–2015, 2019–2020 |
| Lucy Beale | Melissa Suffield | 1993–2010, 2012–2015, 2019–2020 |
| Lucy Beale | Hetti Bywater | 1993–2010, 2012–2015, 2019–2020 |
| Lucy Beale | Uncredited | 1993–2010, 2012–2015, 2019–2020 |
| PC Paul Campbell | Jack Gogarty | 2018–2020 |
| Captain Matthew Cox | Charlie Carter | 2020 |
| Dennis Rickman Jnr | Harry Hickles | 2012–2020 |
| Dennis Rickman Jnr | Bleu Landau | 2012–2020 |
| Daniel Cook | Ade Edmondson | 2019–2020 |
| Loretta Perkins | Sarah Finigan | 2020 |
| Leo King | Tom Wells | 2019–2020 |
| Michaela Turnbull | Fiona Allen | 2019–2020 |
| Cherry Slater | Uncredited | 2018–2020 |
| Dr Laghari | Ezra Faroque Khan | 2020 |
| Chantelle Atkins | Jessica Plummer | 2019–2020 |
| Danny Hardcastle | Paul Usher | 2019–2020 |
| Jags Panesar | Amar Adatia | 2019–2020 |
| Habiba Ahmed | Rukku Nahar | 2019–2020 |
| Ellie Nixon | Mica Paris | 2020 |

=== Last appeared in 2021 ===
| Character | Actor(s) | Duration |
|---|---|---|
| DI Steve Thompson | Philip Wright | 2019–2021 |
| Abi Branning | Uncredited | 2017–2021 |
| Bronson (dog) | Cyrus | 2017–2021 |
| Bronson (dog) | Uncredited | 2017–2021 |
| Caleb Malone | Ben Freeman | 2021 |
| Kush Kazemi | Davood Ghadami | 2014–2021 |
| Estelle Jones | Sue Holderness | 2021 |
| Apostolos Papadopolous | Tarrick Benham | 2018, 2021 |
| Katy Lewis | Simone Lahbib | 2020–2021 |
| Nyangi Marwa | Lucy Vandi | 2021 |
| Jeanette | Dani Dyer | 2021 |
| Simon Atmore | Tom Palmer | 2016, 2021 |
| Tina Carter | Luisa Bradshaw-White | 2013–2021 |
| Jen Glover | Kate Robbins | 2021 |
| Sheree Trueman | Suzette Llewellyn | 2019–2021 |
| Liam Butcher | Sonny Bottomley | 1998–2000, 2002–2004, 2008–2015, 2021 |
| Liam Butcher | Jack and Tom Godolphin | 1998–2000, 2002–2004, 2008–2015, 2021 |
| Liam Butcher | Gavin and Mitchell Vaughan | 1998–2000, 2002–2004, 2008–2015, 2021 |
| Liam Butcher | Nathaniel Gleed | 1998–2000, 2002–2004, 2008–2015, 2021 |
| Liam Butcher | James Forde | 1998–2000, 2002–2004, 2008–2015, 2021 |
| Liam Butcher | Alfie Deegan | 1998–2000, 2002–2004, 2008–2015, 2021 |
| Sandy Gibson | Caroline Pegg | 2010, 2021 |
| Sandy Gibson | Martha Cope | 2010, 2021 |

=== Last appeared in 2022 ===
| Character | Actor(s) | Duration |
|---|---|---|
| Iqra Ahmed | Priya Davdra | 2019–2022 |
| Pam Coker | Lin Blakley | 2014–2019, 2022 |
| Mila Marwa | Ruhtxjiaïh Bèllènéa | 2020–2022 |
| Kioni Marwa | Florisa Kamara | 2021–2022 |
| Nurse Lennon | Dystin Johnson | 2003–2004, 2006, 2018–2019, 2022 |
| Tiffany Butcher | Maisie Smith | 2008–2014, 2016, 2018–2022 |
| Keegan Baker | Zack Morris | 2017–2022 |
| Isaac Baptiste | Stevie Basaula | 2020–2022 |
| Aaron Monroe | Charlie Wernham | 2021–2022 |
| Avery Baker | Omar Lye-Fook | 2022 |
| Ranveer Gulati | Anil Goutam | 2022 |
| Lewis Butler | Aidan O'Callaghan | 2022 |
| Roland Highway | Uncredited | 2022 |
| Rainie Cross | Tanya Franks | 2007–2008, 2010–2011, 2014–2015, 2018–2022 |
| Dana Monroe | Barbara Smith | 2021–2022 |
| Archie Mitchell | Larry Lamb | 2008–2010, 2022 |
| Archie Mitchell | Henry Garrett | 2008–2010, 2022 |
| Ronnie Mitchell | Samantha Womack | 2007–2011, 2013–2017, 2022 |
| Ronnie Mitchell | Lucia De Wan | 2007–2011, 2013–2017, 2022 |
| Glenda Mitchell | Glynis Barber | 2010–2011, 2016–2017, 2022 |
| Glenda Mitchell | Rose Reynolds | 2010–2011, 2016–2017, 2022 |
| Frankie Lewis | Rose Ayling-Ellis | 2020–2022 |
| Kheerat Panesar | Jaz Deol | 2019–2022 |
| Disa O'Brien | Jan Graveson | 1990–1991, 2022 |
| Mary Smith | Linda Davidson | 1985–1988, 2019, 2022 |
| Lofty Holloway | Tom Watt | 1985–1988, 2019, 2022 |
| Barry Clark | Gary Hailes | 1986–1989, 2022 |
| Colin Russell | Michael Cashman | 1986–1989, 2016, 2022 |
| Dotty Cotton | Molly Conlin | 2008–2010, 2019–2022 |
| Dotty Cotton | Milly Zero | 2008–2010, 2019–2022 |
| Alyssa Lennox | Uncredited | 2021–2022 |
| Jada Lennox | Kelsey Calladine-Smith | 2021–2022 |
| Mick Carter | Danny Dyer | 2013–2022 |
| Shirley Carter | Linda Henry | 2006–2022 |

=== Last appeared in 2023 ===
| Character | Actor(s) | Duration | Ref(s) |
|---|---|---|---|
| DCI Samantha Keeble | Alison Newman | 2008, 2014–2016, 2022–2023 | |
| Brett Nelson | Fabrizio Santino | 2023 | |
| Ricky Butcher | Sid Owen | 1988–2000, 2002–2004, 2008–2012, 2022–2023 | |
| Scarlett Butcher | Amelie | 2012–2013, 2021–2023 | |
| Scarlett Butcher | Tabitha Byron | 2012–2013, 2021–2023 | |
| Jed | Bradley Jaden | 2023 | |
| Ryan Malloy | Neil McDermott | 2009–2011, 2014, 2016, 2023 | |
| Vi Highway | Gwen Taylor | 2021–2023 | |
| Shiv | Peter Caulfield | 2023 | |
| Troy | Chris Evangelou | 2023 | |
| Roxy Mitchell | Elodie de Rohan Willner | 2007–2017, 2019, 2022–2023 | |
| Roxy Mitchell | Rita Simons | 2007–2017, 2019, 2022–2023 | |
| Duncan Boyd | David Gillespie | 1987–1989, 2023 | |
| Kenny Morris | Ryan Philpott | 2007–2009, 2011, 2015, 2023 | |
| DS Miles | Samantha Seager | 2023 | |
| Finlay Baker | Ashley Byam | 2022–2023 | |
| Jo Cotton | Vicki Michelle | 2023 | |
| Peggy Taylor | Uncredited | 2019–2020, 2023 | |
| Lisa Fowler | Lucy Benjamin | 1998–2003, 2010, 2017, 2019–2020, 2023 | |
| DC Sally Booth | Sanchia McCormack | 2013, 2016–2017, 2023 | |
| Fatboy | Ricky Norwood | 2010–2015, 2023 | |
| Emma Harding | Patsy Kensit | 2023 | |
| Graham Foster | Alex McSweeney | 2003–2005, 2023 | |
| Chatham Taylor | Alfie Jacob | 2017–2020, 2023 | |
| Riley Taylor | Tom Jacob | 2017–2020, 2023 | |
| Theo Hawthorne | William Ellis | 2023 | |
| Bailey Baker | Kara-Leah Fernandes | 2019–2023 | |
| Mia Atkins | Mahalia Malcolm | 2019–2023 | |
| Mackenzie Atkins | Isaac Lemonius | 2019–2023 | |
| Mitch Baker | Roger Griffiths | 2018–2023 | |

=== Last appeared in 2024 ===
| Character | Actor(s) | Duration | Ref(s) |
|---|---|---|---|
| Ashton | Jensen Clayden | 2023–2024 | |
| Harold Martin | David Sterne | 2024 | |
| Lucas Johnson | Don Gilet | 2008–2010, 2016, 2020–2021, 2024 | |
| Keanu Taylor | Danny Walters | 2017–2020, 2022–2024 | |
| Gloria Knight | Elizabeth Counsell | 2024 | |
| Jasper Parrott (parrot) | Uncredited | 2023–2024 | |
| Jade Masood | Elizabeth Green | 2015–2016, 2023–2024 | |
| Britney Wainwright | Lola Campbell | 2024 | |
| Dolly Dean-Hudson | Uncredited | 2024 | |
| Stevie Mitchell | Dean Roberts | 2022, 2024 | |
| Stevie Mitchell | Alan Ford | 2022, 2024 | |
| Debbie Colwell | Jenny Meier | 2023–2024 | |
| Ayesha Siddhu | Laila Rouass | 2024 | |
| Maya Houssain | Bharti Patel | 2024 | |
| Kobina Asare | Jonathan Nyati | 2024 | |
| Dean Wicks | Matt Di Angelo | 2006–2008, 2014–2016, 2023–2024 | |
| Jane Beale | Laurie Brett | 2004–2012, 2014–2017, 2024 | |
| Bobby Beale | Kevin Curran | 2003–2017, 2019–2024 | |
| Bobby Beale | Alex Francis | 2003–2017, 2019–2024 | |
| Bobby Beale | Rory Stroud | 2003–2017, 2019–2024 | |
| Bobby Beale | Eliot Carrington | 2003–2017, 2019–2024 | |
| Bobby Beale | Clay Milner Russell | 2003–2017, 2019–2024 | |
| Pastor Clayton | Howard Saddler | 2023–2024 | |
| Hugh Collins | Michael Bertenshaw | 2024 | |
| David Wicks | Michael French | 1993–1996, 2012–2014, 2024 | |
| Joe Wicks | Paul Nicholls | 1996–1997, 2024 | |
| Holly | Chloe Marshall | 2024 | |
| Mickey Miller | Joe Swash | 2003–2008, 2011, 2024 | |
| Tyson (dog) | Spud | 2023–2024 | |

=== Last appeared in 2025 ===
| Character | Actor(s) | Duration | Ref(s) |
|---|---|---|---|
| Mr Lister | Nick Wilton | 2008–2013, 2016–2018, 2020–2022, 2024–2025 | |
| Garry Hobbs | Ricky Groves | 2000–2009, 2025 | |
| Minty Peterson | Cliff Parisi | 2002–2010, 2025 | |
| Peggy Mitchell | Jo Warne | 1991, 1994–2010, 2013–2016, 2022, 2025 | |
| Peggy Mitchell | Barbara Windsor | 1991, 1994–2010, 2013–2016, 2022, 2025 | |
| Peggy Mitchell | Jaime Winstone | 1991, 1994–2010, 2013–2016, 2022, 2025 | |
| Eric Mitchell | George Russo | 2022, 2025 | |
| Angie Watts | Anita Dobson | 1985–1988, 2025 | |
| Martin Fowler | Jon Peyton-Price | 1985–2007, 2014–2025 | |
| Martin Fowler | James Alexandrou | 1985–2007, 2014–2025 | |
| Martin Fowler | James Bye | 1985–2007, 2014–2025 | |
| Reiss Colwell | Jonny Freeman | 2022–2025 | |
| Brenda Collins | Nichola McAuliffe | 2024–2025 | |
| Gaz | Keith Allen | 2025 | |
| Andy | Jake Rory | 2025 | |
| Ruby Allen | Louisa Lytton | 2005–2006, 2018–2021, 2024–2025 | |
| Roman Allen | Leo | 2024–2025 | |
| Tom "Rocky" Cotton | Brian Conley | 2021–2023, 2025 | |
| Terry Cant | Glen Davies | 2025 | |
| Julia Fowler | Uncredited | 2025 | |
| Bex Fowler | Alex and Vicky Gonzalez | 2000–2002, 2005–2007, 2014–2020, 2025 | |
| Bex Fowler | Jade Sharif | 2000–2002, 2005–2007, 2014–2020, 2025 | |
| Bex Fowler | Jasmine Armfield | 2000–2002, 2005–2007, 2014–2020, 2025 | |
| Sonia Fowler | Natalie Cassidy | 1993–2007, 2010–2011, 2014–2025 | |
| Bianca Jackson | Patsy Palmer | 1993–1999, 2008–2014, 2019, 2024–2025 | |
| Felix Baker | Matthew James Morrison | 2022–2025 | |
| Bernadette Taylor | Clair Norris | 2017–2025 | |
| Jay Brown | Jamie Borthwick | 2006–2025 | |
| Jonno Highway | Richard Graham | 2019, 2025 | |
| Arthur Fowler | Hunter Bell | 2015–2025 | |
| Arthur Fowler | Rocco Brenner | 2015–2025 | |
| Hope Fowler | Frankie Brennan | 2017–2025 | |
| Hope Fowler | Noach Persell | 2017–2025 | |
| Hope Fowler | Isabelle Smith | 2017–2025 | |
| Stacey Slater | Lacey Turner | 2004–2010, 2014–2025 | |
| Stuart Highway | Ricky Champ | 2018–2022, 2025 | |
| Ben Mitchell | Matthew Silver | 1996–2001, 2006–2012, 2014–2025 | |
| Ben Mitchell | Morgan Whittle | 1996–2001, 2006–2012, 2014–2025 | |
| Ben Mitchell | Charlie Jones | 1996–2001, 2006–2012, 2014–2025 | |
| Ben Mitchell | Joshua Pascoe | 1996–2001, 2006–2012, 2014–2025 | |
| Ben Mitchell | Harry Reid | 1996–2001, 2006–2012, 2014–2025 | |
| Ben Mitchell | Max Bowden | 1996–2001, 2006–2012, 2014–2025 | |
| Belinda Peacock | Leanne Lakey | 2001–2003, 2016, 2018, 2025 | |
| Belinda Peacock | Carli Norris | 2001–2003, 2016, 2018, 2025 | |
| Belinda Peacock | Uncredited | 2001–2003, 2016, 2018, 2025 | |
| Belinda Peacock | Cerys Wing | 2001–2003, 2016, 2018, 2025 | |
| Little Mo Mitchell | Kacey Ainsworth | 2000–2006, 2018, 2025 | |
| Little Mo Mitchell | Layla Ingleby | 2000–2006, 2018, 2025 | |
| Lynne Hobbs | Elaine Lordan | 2000–2004, 2018, 2025 | |
| Lynne Hobbs | Isabelle Jones | 2000–2004, 2018, 2025 | |
| Lynne Hobbs | Libby Brake | 2000–2004, 2018, 2025 | |
| Viv Slater | Debi Gibson | 2001, 2004, 2018, 2025 | |
| Viv Slater | Natasya Rush | 2001, 2004, 2018, 2025 | |
| Viv Slater | Laura Curnick | 2001, 2004, 2018, 2025 | |
| Viv Slater | Scarlett Brookes | 2001, 2004, 2018, 2025 | |
| Charlie Slater | Derek Martin | 2000–2011, 2013, 2016, 2018, 2025 | |
| Charlie Slater | Richie Daysh | 2000–2011, 2013, 2016, 2018, 2025 | |
| Charlie Slater | Martin Maynard | 2000–2011, 2013, 2016, 2018, 2025 | |
| Harry Slater | Michael Elphick | 2001, 2018, 2025 | |
| Harry Slater | Dale Hayes | 2001, 2018, 2025 | |
| Harry Slater | Stephen Leask | 2001, 2018, 2025 | |
| Tobias "Okie" Okyere | Aayan Ibikunle Shoderu | 2025 | |
| Junior Knight | Micah Balfour | 2024–2025 | |
| Freddie Slater | Alex and Tom Kilby | 2004–2006, 2022–2025 | |
| Freddie Slater | Bobby Brazier | 2004–2006, 2022–2025 | |
| Anna Knight | Molly Rainford | 2023–2025 | |
| Pat Butcher | Pam St Clement | 1986–2012, 2016, 2025 | |
| Barry Evans | Shaun Williamson | 1994–2004, 2025 | |
| Debbie Bates | Nicola Duffett | 1993–1995, 2025 | |

=== Last appeared in 2026 ===
| Character | Actor(s) | Duration | Ref(s) |
|---|---|---|---|
| Nish Panesar | Navin Chowdhry | 2022–2026 | |
| Councillor Barker | Iain Fletcher | 2025–2026 | |
| Chrissie Watts | Tracy-Ann Oberman | 2004–2005, 2024–2026 | |
| Jake Moon | Joel Beckett | 2004–2006, 2024, 2026 | |
| Anthony Trueman | Nicholas Bailey | 2000–2005, 2014, 2025–2026 | |
| Lola Pearce | Danielle Harold | 2011–2015, 2019–2026 | |
| Tim Walton | Tom Ratcliffe | 2025–2026 | |
| Cora Cross | Ann Mitchell | 2011–2015, 2017–2018, 2026 | |
| Nina Gupta | Hersha Verity | 2022, 2026 | |
| Nigel Bates | Paul Bradley | 1992–1998, 2024–2026 | |
| Clare Bates | Gemma Bissix | 1993–1998, 2008, 2025–2026 | |
| Josh Saunders | Jon Lee | 1997–1998, 2026 | |
| Julie Bates | Karen Henthorn | 1997–1998, 2025–2026 | |
| Whitney Dean | Shona McGarty | 2008–2024, 2026 | |
| Sam Mitchell | Danniella Westbrook | 1990–1993, 1995–1996, 1999–2000, 2002–2005, 2009–2010, 2016, 2022–2026 | |
| Sam Mitchell | Laila Murphy | 1990–1993, 1995–1996, 1999–2000, 2002–2005, 2009–2010, 2016, 2022–2026 | |
| Sam Mitchell | Kim Medcalf | 1990–1993, 1995–1996, 1999–2000, 2002–2005, 2009–2010, 2016, 2022–2026 | |
| Grant Mitchell | Teddy Jay | 1990–1999, 2005–2006, 2016, 2022, 2025–2026 | |
| Grant Mitchell | Ross Kemp | 1990–1999, 2005–2006, 2016, 2022, 2025–2026 | |
| Eddie Knight | Christopher Fairbank | 2024, 2026 | |
| Sandra Goodwin | Dawn Steele | 2026 | |
| Karen Taylor | Lorraine Stanley | 2017–2024, 2026 | |
| Bea Pollard | Ronni Ancona | 2026 | |
| Libby Fox | Belinda Owusu | 2006–2010, 2014–2017, 2026 | |
| Cleo Marshall | Mazz Murray | 2026 | |
| Sheila Atkins | Sheila Ruskin | 2026 | |
| Gray Atkins | Toby-Alexander Smith | 2019–2022, 2026 | |
| Teddy Mitchell | Roland Manookian | 2024–2026 | |
| Clive Masters | Jason Durr | 2026 | |
| Zoe Slater | Michelle Ryan | 2000–2005, 2025–2026 | |
| Priya Nandra-Hart | Sophie Khan Levy | 2023–2026 | |
| Craig Ingram | Matthew James-Bailey | 2026 | |

== See also ==
- List of EastEnders characters
