= Paul Corrigan =

Paul Corrigan may refer to:

- Paul Corrigan (political adviser) (born 1948), Director of Strategy and Commissioning of the NHS London Strategic Health Authority
- Paul Corrigan (footballer) (born 1977), Australian rules footballer for Geelong and current Essendon development coach
- Paul Corrigan, American television writer and producer, see Modern Family
- Paul Corrigan (actor), English actor, see List of former EastEnders characters
