= List of Mooroolbark SC players =

Mooroolbark Soccer Club, an association football club based in Mooroolbark, Melbourne, was founded in 1962 as Mooroolbark United. They were admitted into the National Soccer League for the 1977 season. The club's first team had competed in the National Soccer League, and all players who have played at least one such match are listed below.

Geoff Ontong and Paul Ontong holds the record for the greatest number of appearances for Mooroolbark. The Australian defenders played 27 times for the club. The club's goalscoring record was held by Joe Tront, who scored seven goals in all competitions.

== Key ==
- The list is ordered first by date of debut, and then if necessary in alphabetical order.
- Appearances as a substitute are included.

Positions key
GK	Goalkeeper
DF	Defender
MF	Midfielder
FW	Forward

Nationality
Unless otherwise noted, the nationality of a player is determined by the country/countries which he has played for, or if said person has not played international football, their country of birth.
Club career
Club career is defined as the first and last calendar years in which the player appeared for the club in any of the competitions listed below.
Total appearances and Total goals
Total appearances and goals comprise those in the National Soccer League and NSL Cup.

== Players ==
List of Mooroolbark SC players
Player	Nationality	Pos	Club career	Starts	Subs	Total	Goals
Player	Nationality	Pos	Club career	Appearances			Goals
Derek Bailey	Australia	–	1977	6	1	7	0
Walter Bojczuk	Australia	FW	1977	14	6	20	1
Mike Cleary	Australia	FW	1977	11	1	12	1
David Ellis	Australia	DF	1977	8	6	14	1
Max Irvan	Australia	–	1977	21	2	23	0
Lou Ivanoff	Australia	GK	1977	11	0	11	0
Geoff Ontong	South Africa	DF	1977	25	2	27	3
Paul Ontong	South Africa	DF	1977	24	3	27	1
Alan Pongho	Australia	–	1977	24	0	24	0
Paul Priestley	Australia	–	1977	0	1	1	0
Mike Sinclair	Australia	–	1977	5	2	7	0
Joe Tront	Scotland	FW	1977	13	0	13	7
Peter Vaughan	Australia	–	1977	6	2	8	0
Gordon McGregor	Scotland	FW	1977	17	4	21	0
Paul Wilding	Australia	GK	1977	13	1	14	0
Malcolm Hayward	Australia	DF	1977	0	1	1	0
Dave Rigby	Australia	MF	1977	2	1	3	0
Brian Thorn	Australia	–	1977	11	5	16	0
Ian Williamson	Australia	DF	1977	8	2	10	0
Pat Lowrey	England	–	1977	17	2	19	5
Eugene McConville	Australia	–	1977	0	1	1	0
Mike Shuttleworth	Australia	–	1977	3	0	3	0
Barry Fairbrother	England	FW	1977	14	0	14	3
Nick Lowe	Australia	–	1977	8	0	8	1
Paul O'Reilly	Australia	–	1977	8	2	10	1
Terry Hawke	Australia	GK	1977	4	0	4	0
