= Nellie Ellis =

Fictional character from the BBC soap opera EastEnders

- EastEnders character
- Portrayed by: Elizabeth Kelly
- Duration: 1993–1998, 2000
- First appearance: Episode 928; 23 December 1993
- Last appearance: Episode 2003; 18 September 2000
- Introduced by: Leonard Lewis (1993); John Yorke (2000)
In-universe information
- Occupation: Retired
- Mother: Nora
- Husband: George Ellis (backstory)
- First cousins: Lou Beale
- Other relatives: Pauline Fowler; Michelle Fowler; Mark Fowler; Martin Fowler; Ian Beale; David Wicks; Joe Wicks

Nellie Ellis is a fictional character from the BBC soap opera EastEnders, played by Elizabeth Kelly. Nellie is introduced as the interfering relative of Pauline Fowler (Wendy Richard) in 1993 and appears regularly until 1998. She makes a further appearance in 2000 for the funeral of Ethel Skinner (Gretchen Franklin). She moves in with the Fowlers in early 1994, and appears to be extremely annoying and interfering. However, she proves useful in getting Michelle Fowler's (Susan Tully) money back from Frank Butcher (Mike Reid), who had unwittingly sold Michelle a stolen Austin Metro, which was subsequently apprehended by the police.

Nellie decides to move out from the Fowlers' in November, and moves in with Jules Tavernier (Tommy Eytle), which proves awkward, as Jules suffers from lumbago due to sleeping on his sofa while Nellie has his bed. In early 1995, she is seen drinking with Ethel in The Queen Victoria public house. They do not see eye to eye, but seem to enjoy each other's company. During Ethel's 80th birthday party, Nellie is told she has a flat in the same sheltered accommodation as Ethel. They are both irritated by this, but Ethel later turns up to see her exit from the square, and holds her cat Mandoo on the way to the flats.

Nellie only returns to the square occasionally from then on, being mostly seen with Ethel. Nellie is frequently a discreet physical support for the older Ethel, especially in outdoor scenes. The duo's sparring continues, but it is clear that they are good friends, with Ethel defending her against Mark Fowler (Todd Carty) during an argument at Pauline's, caused by the distress of Arthur Fowler's (Bill Treacher) recent death.

She has an old rivalry reignited when Arthur's aunt attends his funeral in June 1996, and is present during Mark's HIV revelation the following month. By 1997, Ethel is seen much less frequently, so Nellie often appears alongside Dot Cotton, who initially seems to feel lumbered by Nellie's presence. They often talk about Ethel, and organise a party for her in The Queen Vic in 1998, only to be dumped by Ethel for a date with a toy boy. Nellie last appears in 2000, attending Ethel's funeral with Dr. Harold Legg (Leonard Fenton).

== Creation and development ==
Nellie, played by Elizabeth Kelly, was one of two characters introduced by executive producer Leonard Lewis in December 1993, the other being David Wicks (Michael French). They were the beginning of an array of new characters introduced to accommodate the advent of EastEnders' screening of three weekly episodes, early in 1994. Nellie was introduced as the relative of Pauline Fowler (Wendy Richard), and made a brief appearance for Pete Beale's (Peter Dean) funeral, before moving to the soap's setting of Albert Square in 1994. Nellie resided with the Fowlers and her primary purpose initially was to antagonise Pauline's husband Arthur Fowler (Bill Treacher). Writer Colin Brake has suggested that Arthur found Nellie to be an "interfering old lady", reminiscent of Pauline's deceased mother Lou Beale (Anna Wing) "at her worst".

Nellie has been described as a "pantomime baddie". Her name preceded her in the soap before her initial appearance as she was frequently used as an excuse for Pauline to leave the soap's setting to visit her. Author Kate Lock described Nellie as stingy and an interfering old busybody. She stated, "When stingy Nellie wasn't giving Arthur grief, she was flirting in a button-up sort of way with Jules Tavernier (Tommy Eytle)."

On-screen Nellie remained living with the Fowlers until she was rehoused late in 1994. Following this, Nellie appeared sporadically as a semi-regular character until 1998. She and several of the other semi-regular pensioner characters, including Ethel and Jules, were not used throughout the tenure of executive producer Matthew Robinson (1998–2000). However, Nellie returned under executive producer John Yorke for a one-off appearance in September 2000 for Ethel's funeral, which would prove to be her last appearance.

== Storylines ==
Nellie, the cousin of Lou Beale (Anna Wing), first appears in Walford in December 1993 for the funeral of Lou's son Pete Beale (Peter Dean). When she falls and breaks her hip the following month, Lou's daughter Pauline Fowler (Wendy Richard) lets her stay with her family so she can be cared for until she is better. Not wanting to live alone in Ilford, Nellie emotionally blackmails Pauline and offers her a cash loan; Pauline feels obliged to allow her to move in. Nellie and Ethel Skinner (Gretchen Franklin) often go drinking together but have little in common and usually end up arguing. She befriends her much younger in-law Cindy Beale (Michelle Collins) and cousin David Wicks (Michael French); the latter only begins spending time with her so she will invest money in his car business. She also has a cat named Mandoo. Mandoo goes missing in July 1996 and Nellie searches for her. David's son Joe Wicks (Paul Nicholls) finds Mandoo dead next to the metal fencing that has recently been erected around the Children's Playground.

Joe takes Mandoo home and hides her in a box under his bed. Once Mandoo is discovered by David, Joe finds Nellie and tells her that he has buried Mandoo and that he found her and she was already dead, but delayed telling Nellie as he did not want to upset her.

She is often seen criticising Pauline's husband Arthur Fowler (Bill Treacher), who tries in vain to get her to move out. Nellie's husband had left her for a woman named Doreen and because Arthur cheated on Pauline, Nellie resents him. For forty years, Nellie had not divorced George and he had never asked for a divorce. He dies in November 1994 and Nellie attends his funeral, resulting in some conflict with George's daughter Louise (Cate Fowler). Before Nellie returns to Walford, she and George's partner Doreen (Olga Lowe) find closure and she resolves her differences with Arthur. Following this, Nellie decides to move out of the Fowlers' home to give them space to rebuild their marriage. She briefly moves in with fellow pensioner Jules Tavernier (Tommy Eytle), but despite flirtations, the relationship remains platonic. When Jules starts getting back pains from sleeping on his sofa (Nellie has his bed), Nellie attempts to manipulate the Fowlers into letting her return by pretending that she has had various accidents to gain sympathy. This almost works until Pauline's daughter Michelle Fowler (Susan Tully) gets Nellie residence in sheltered accommodation with Ethel, much to Nellie's chagrin. Following this, Nellie shows up occasionally in Walford for visits. She is last seen attending Ethel's funeral in September 2000 and sends a wreath to both Pauline's funeral in 2007 and Lucy Beale's (Hetti Bywater) funeral in 2014 but does not attend.

== Reception ==
In 2003, a reporter suggested that the storyline concerning Nellie's problematic rehousing in 1994 was tedious and "was probably then that the nation realised that its favourite soap had finally run out of entertaining and original storylines." In 2026, Michael Adams from Radio Times called Nellie "beloved" and opined that she had an "unusual friendship" with Ethel.
