= Trevor Short =

Fictional character

- EastEnders character
- Portrayed by: Phil McDermott
- Duration: 1989–1990
- First appearance: Episode 451; 1 June 1989
- Last appearance: Episode 529; 1 March 1990
- Introduced by: Mike Gibbon
In-universe information
- Occupation: Odd job man

Trevor Short is a fictional character from the BBC soap opera EastEnders, played by Phil McDermott from 1 June 1989 to 1 March 1990.

Trevor is the inseparable sidekick of Paul Priestly (Mark Thrippleton). He is a well-meaning individual but he is not blessed with much intelligence and he manages to mess up almost every job he is given. He has several crushes on the younger women of Walford, but despite his best efforts he never manages to find a girlfriend.

== Character creation and development ==
1989 was a year of big change for EastEnders, both behind the cameras and in front of them. Original production designer, Keith Harris, left the show, and co-creators, Tony Holland and Julia Smith, both decided that the time had come to move on too; their final contribution coincided with the exit of one of EastEnders most successful characters, Den Watts (Leslie Grantham). A new executive producer, Mike Gibbon, was given the arduous task of taking over the show and he enlisted the most experienced writers to take over the storylining of the programme, including Charlie Humphreys, Jane Hollowood and Tony McHale.

The departure of two of the soap's most popular characters, Den and Angie Watts (Anita Dobson), had left a massive void in the programme which needed to be filled. In addition, several other long running characters left the show that year, including two original cast members, Sue and Ali Osman (Sandy Ratcliff and Nejdet Salih) and their family; Donna Ludlow (Matilda Ziegler); Carmel Jackson (Judith Jacob) and her family and one of the show's more controversial characters, Colin Russell (Michael Cashman). So, it was decided that 1989 was to be a year of change in Walford. EastEnders script-writer, Colin Brake, has suggested that "it was almost as if Walford itself was making a fresh start".

At the time the programme had come under criticism in the British media for being too depressing, arguably a reputation that it has never been able to shake. The programme makers were determined to change this. In 1989, there was a deliberate attempt to increase the lighter, more comic aspects of life in Albert Square. This led to the introduction of some characters who were deliberately conceived as comic or light-hearted. Such characters included Trevor Short, the "nearest thing to a village idiot that Walford had seen in many years", and his friend, northern heartbreaker Paul Priestly (Mark Thrippleton); Julie Cooper (Louise Plowright), the man-mad hairdresser; Marge Green — a batty older lady played by veteran comedy actress, Pat Coombs; wheeler-dealer Vince Johnson (Hepburn Graham) and Laurie Bates (Gary Powell, who became Pete Beale's (Peter Dean) sparring partner.

Trevor Short was a dim-witted odd job man, who drifted into Albert Square in search of his friend and a new home. He was a well-intentioned but lonely misfit that rarely got anything right; a role that had been largely absent since the departure of Lofty Holloway in 1988 — although Trevor would prove to be a substantially less successful character in comparison. The writers' original intention had been for Trevor to be a tall Scot. The actor Phil McDermott auditioned for the role even though he was a short Londoner of Irish descent. Despite McDermott's obvious differences to the original character conception, he managed to get the job by crying for five minutes on cue during his audition.

Humour was an important element in the storylines during 1989, with a greater amount of slapstick and light comedy than ever before. Trevor's character in particular was regularly used for comic effect, with emphasis placed on his inferior intelligence and ability to turn any small task into a disaster. As well as playing sidekick to Paul, Trevor was also featured heavily with the hardened battleaxe Mo Butcher (Edna Doré); docile Trevor being the perfect foil for taking the brunt of Mo's bossy and dominant personality, which he did willingly.

1989's changes were a brave experiment and while some found this period of EastEnders entertaining, many other viewers felt that the comedy stretched the programme's credibility somewhat. Although the programme still covered many issues in 1989, such as domestic violence, drugs, rape and racism, the new emphasis on a more balanced mix between "light and heavy storylines" gave the illusion that the show had lost a "certain edge".

By the end of the year EastEnders had acquired a new executive producer, Michael Ferguson, who had previously been a successful producer on ITV's The Bill. Ultimately, Ferguson was responsible for bringing in a new sense of vitality and creating a programme that was more in touch with the real world than it had been over the last year. A new era began in 1990 with the introduction of the Mitchell brothers, two hugely successful characters who would go on to dominate the soap thereafter. As the new production machine cleared the way for new characters and a new direction, a number of characters were axed from the show at the start of the year. Among them was Trevor, as well as every other "comedic" character that had been introduced to the show in 1989. By March 1990 they had all gone. Several of the actors were upset to be leaving the programme so soon, but with the show's new direction there was no place for characters "whose prime function was to be comic relief".

== Storylines ==
Trevor arrives in June 1989 in search of his friend, the builder Paul Priestly (Mark Thrippleton), who had roomed with him briefly at a youth hostel. Paul is not pleased to see Trevor initially, but he nevertheless finds him a job working on a construction site with him.

A dim-witted individual "two biscuits short of a box" is how they describe him in The Queen Victoria public house. His life has been hard. Rejected by his parents, he spent his youth in and out of children's homes and never really felt that he belonged anywhere as a result.

Trevor manages to hit it off with the pensioner Mo Butcher (Edna Doré) after he kindly mends a broken washing machine at the launderette. Mo decides to take Trevor under her wing, and ropes him into helping with the renovation of the community centre. However, foolish Trevor steals the supplies from the construction site he is working at, and when Mo forces him to return them, he is caught and loses his job. An array of odd jobs follow for Trevor, all equally unsuccessful. He has a brief spell as the potman at The Vic but he proves a liability. Landlord Frank Butcher (Mike Reid) gives him a job at his car lot, which only lasts a few days before his ineptitude becomes too much for Frank to bear. Ian Beale (Adam Woodyatt) hires him to remove a partition in his café, but this goes awry when Trevor resurrects the partition after he'd just demolished it. Despite all these blunders, Paul still persists in helping his friend out, and allows him to assist him with the renovation of Julie Cooper's (Louise Plowright) salon and the decorating of Karim's (Aftab Sachak) new property. True to form, Trevor even manages to make a mess of these jobs when he strikes a water main — flooding the market — and causing the Karim's ceiling to collapse.

In July 1989 Trevor begins lodging with Mo, who he often refers to as "Mrs. Mo". He finds work tending a stall on the market, but has most of the contents stolen by thieves and is the victim of many practical jokes from hooligans such as Junior Roberts (Aaron Carrington) and his girlfriend Melody (Lyanne Compton). He later works on Pete Beale's (Peter Dean) fruit and veg stall.

Trevor develops a crush on Paul's casual girlfriend, Diane Butcher (Sophie Lawrence), which is not reciprocated. He sides with Diane when Paul jilts her in favour of Julie Cooper. He lends her his support and even invites her out one night, which Diane agrees to, but only to make Paul jealous. Trevor is overjoyed and thinks that a relationship will be possible. His dreams, however are shattered when Paul dumps Julie and immediately reconciles with Diane.

More bad luck follows for Trevor when he becomes the prime suspect for a series of thefts at The Queen Vic. Trevor is not guilty and is just unlucky enough to be in the wrong place at the wrong time. After receiving a tirade of abuse from Frank and being barred from The Vic, Trevor does some investigating for himself and discovers that the real culprit is Frank's daughter, Janine (Rebecca Michael). After confronting her, she runs away from home in fear. Trevor is beside himself with worry, hysterically blaming himself for the whole ordeal. Janine is eventually found inside a derelict van with the stolen items on her, and Trevor is exonerated.

During the latter part of 1989, Trevor manages to get himself into trouble with the Department of Social Security for benefit fraud. It is revealed that Trevor has been signing on for unemployment benefit while being employed at Pete's stall. For a while it looks as if Trevor will face prosecution or a heavy fine, and he reacts with typical hysteria at the prospect of going to prison. In the end, he manages to avoid this by signing off of 'the dole' and promising to never fraudulently claim benefits again.

In December 1989, Trevor is heartbroken when Paul decides he'd had enough of living in London, and moves away from Walford. Trevor mopes around feeling sorry for himself for a while but manages to take his mind off things by developing a new crush, this time on Shireen Karim (Nisha Kapur). Shireen is polite enough to let him think his attention is appreciated and even agrees to go on a date with him. Trevor spends a lot of time preparing for the date, seeking advice from almost everyone on the Square, and it ends up being a success. However, after the date, Shireen tells Trevor that it can only be a one off occurrence, as she is already betrothed. Trevor is outraged and makes several attempts to point out the unfairness of arranged marriages to Shireen's father, all of which have no effect whatsoever.

In February 1990, Paul returns to Walford briefly to give Frank Butcher information on his missing daughter, Diane, who has run away from home. Trevor is overjoyed to see him again, but his happiness is fleeting as Paul soon announces that he is leaving once again, and this time for good. Seeing how upset Trevor is over this, Paul decides to ask him to join him in his home town of Leeds. As Trevor has made such a great success of gardening the local allotments, Paul is sure that he can make a career of it up north. Trevor is overjoyed, and leaves with Paul in March 1990.
