= Paul Priestley =

Fictional character from the BBC soap opera EastEnders

- EastEnders character
- Portrayed by: Mark Thrippleton
- Duration: 1989–1990
- First appearance: Episode 439; 20 April 1989
- Last appearance: Episode 529; 1 March 1990
- Introduced by: Mike Gibbon
In-universe information
- Occupation: Builder
- Sisters: Gail Priestley

Paul Priestley is a fictional character from the BBC soap opera EastEnders, played by Mark Thrippleton, from 20 April 1989 to 1 March 1990.

Paul, a builder, came to London with a building firm he worked for, then decided to go it alone. He finds work around the Square — the money is not great but there are benefits — for instance, Julie Cooper (Louise Plowright) discusses his building estimates while sharing a bed with him. He is a ladies man and a heart-breaker, as sixteen-year-old Diane Butcher (Sophie Lawrence) discovers. When their relationship grows too serious, he flees and a devastated Diane runs away from home shortly afterwards.

== Character creation and development ==
1989 was a year of big change for EastEnders, both behind the cameras and in front of them. Original production designer, Keith Harris, left the show, and co-creators, Tony Holland and Julia Smith, both decided that the time had come to move on too; their final contribution coinciding with the exit of one of EastEnders most successful characters, Den Watts (Leslie Grantham). A new producer, Mike Gibbon, was given the arduous task of taking over the show and he enlisted the most experienced writers to take over the storylining of the programme, including Charlie Humphreys, Jane Hollowood and Tony McHale.

The departure of two of the soap's most popular characters, Den and Angie Watts (Anita Dobson), had left a massive void in the programme, which needed to be filled. In addition several other long running characters left the show that year including two original cast members, Sue and Ali Osman (Sandy Ratcliff and Nejdet Salih) and their family; Donna Ludlow (Matilda Ziegler); Carmel Jackson (Judith Jacob) and her family and one of the show's more controversial characters, Colin Russell (Michael Cashman). So, it was decided that 1989 was to be a year of change in Walford. EastEnders script-writer, Colin Brake, has suggested that "it was almost as if Walford itself was making a fresh start".

At the time the programme had come under criticism in the British media for being too depressing; arguably a reputation that it has never been able to shake. The programme makers were determined to change this. In 1989 there was a deliberate attempt to increase the lighter, more comic aspects of life in Albert Square. This led to the introduction of some characters who were deliberately conceived as comic or light-hearted. Such characters included Paul Priestley, a northern heartbreaker, and his sidekick Trevor Short (Phil McDermott), "the nearest thing to a village idiot that Walford had seen in many years" Paul Priestly was a cheeky, carefree romeo, whose principal purpose was to become Walford's latest teen heartthrob. Since 1985, this role had been occupied by the hugely popular Simon Wicks (Nick Berry), but as the character aged and took on a more mature role, the programme needed a new teen pin-up to appeal to the younger audience. The actor Mark Thrippleton shared many similarities with the character of Paul. Like Paul he came from Leeds, had a strong Yorkshire accent, and before taking up acting he was a builder. As he also looked the part Thrippleton was given the role.

Humour was an important element in the storylines during 1989, with a greater amount of slapstick and light comedy than ever before. The character of Paul was regularly used for comic effect in conjunction with his dim-witted sidekick Trevor Short, who Paul compassionately employed as a labourer. Emphasis was placed on the obvious differences between the two friends, as well as Trevor's tendency to idolise Paul and fail at every task he was given. Paul would despair over Trevor's ineptitude, but although Trevor was more of a liability than a labourer, Paul remained his loyal defender and persisted in helping him out and taking responsibility for his errors.

1989's changes were a brave experiment and while some found this period of EastEnders entertaining, many other viewers felt that the comedy stretched the programme's credibility somewhat. Although the programme still covered many issues in 1989, such as domestic violence, drugs, rape and racism, the new emphasis on a more balanced mix between "light and heavy storylines" gave the illusion that the show had lost a "certain edge".

By the end of the year, EastEnders had acquired a new executive producer, Michael Ferguson, who had previously been a successful producer on ITV's The Bill. Ultimately, Ferguson was responsible for bringing in a new sense of vitality, and creating a programme that was more in touch with the real world than it had been over the last year. A new era began in 1990 with the introduction of the Mitchell brothers, Phil (Steve McFadden) and Grant (Ross Kemp), two hugely successful characters, who would go on to dominate the soap thereafter. As the new production machine cleared the way for new characters and a new direction, a number of characters were axed from the show at the start of the year. Among them was Paul, as well as every other "comedic" character that had been introduced to the show in 1989. By March 1990 they had all gone. Several of the actors were upset to be leaving the programme so soon, but with the show's new direction there was no place for characters "whose prime function was to be comic relief".

== Storylines ==
Originally from Leeds, Paul came to London with a building firm he worked for. He arrives in Walford in April 1989 in search of a place to stay and soon begins lodging with the Butchers at The Queen Victoria public house.

Paul has quite an impact on the ladies of Walford, particularly the school girl Diane Butcher (Sophie Lawrence), who is instantly attracted to him. Her father Frank (Mike Reid) becomes extremely worried about all the attention she gives Paul. His fears are mistakenly realised when Paul takes Diane to a Deacon Blue concert and they are both assaulted on their way home by a gang of violent thugs. As the gang team up on Paul, Diane is struck while attempting to fend them off. She runs home to the Vic to get help, however Frank immediately assumes that Paul is the one who has struck her. When Paul escapes the thugs and returns to the Vic, he is greeted by a furious Frank, who knocks him to the floor with a punch. Only after Paul has fled in fear does a hysterical Diane manage to explain what had really occurred. Frank is forced to apologise for his overreaction and as Paul is relatively laid back, he does not bear him any grudges. Paul and Diane begin dating, although spending time alone together is almost impossible with Frank watching their every move, not to mention Mo Butcher (Edna Doré) — who takes to standing guard outside their bedrooms at night to stop any secret liaisons. While Diane quickly falls in love with Paul, it is not nearly as serious for him.

In June 1989 Paul's friend Trevor Short (Phil McDermott) comes to Walford in search of him. He and Trevor had shared a room together briefly at a youth hostel. Trevor is a dim-witted, needy individual who idolises Paul. Paul is not exactly thrilled to see Trevor initially, but soon comes round to the idea of having him around. When Paul decides to take on some freelance work, he employs Trevor as a builder's aid, although he is more of a liability than a labourer and makes many disastrous mistakes. Paul finds a fair bit of work around Walford, his first big job being the conversion of Julie Cooper's (Louise Plowright) salon. Julie takes a shine to Paul and while Diane is waiting for Paul to take her on a romantic date, Julie seduces him and they have sex. Paul continues to mess Diane around, standing her up on several occasions to be with Julie. Diane is devastated by his sudden rejection, but she places the blame entirely on Julie. Meanwhile, Paul soon begins to feel that Julie is merely using him in order to get a cheap deal for his labour and he begins to take against her flirtatious behaviour towards other men. He dumps her and refuses to finish the salon conversion. Julie, who only saw their fling as a bit of fun, is not particularly bothered about the end of their affair, but refuses to pay him for his prior work unless he finishes the salon, so Paul is forced to continue. Immediately after finishing with Julie, Paul returns to Diane and she willingly takes him back. She will not forgive Julie however, and plays various vengeful tricks on her as payback.

Paul finds work redecorating Ashraf Karim's (Aftab Sachak) property, which is hindered somewhat by the ineptitude of Trevor, who causes the property's ceiling to collapse. Paul and Diane's relationship continues, but it soon becomes obvious to everyone that Paul is losing interest in her. Oblivious to this, Diane's feelings only strengthen and she even invites him away for a weekend alone together, indicating that sex will be on the agenda. Paul, who still has Frank watching his every move, declines the offer, but Diane is not perturbed and by the end of the year she has got it into her head that Paul wants to marry her. Actually the relationship has grown far too serious for Paul's liking. He begins to tire of living in London and longs for his old life and the people back up north. After finishing the Karim's property he breaks the news that he is leaving to Trevor and hints that it is unlikely he will return. Meanwhile, Diane is adamant that Paul is about to propose and even instructs Trevor to show Paul the engagement ring she wants. Trevor tries to convince Paul to tell Diane that he is leaving, but Paul cannot pluck up the courage to do it and says his goodbyes to everyone but her. Eventually Trevor informs Diane that Paul is leaving and she reacts with anger and disbelief. She goes in search of him and sees him waiting at a bus stop. She calls out to him, but Paul merely glances at her before getting on a bus and leaving.

Diane is devastated to lose Paul and in January 1990 (on her sixteenth birthday) she runs away from home without trace. Frank blames Paul for her disappearance and goes to Leeds to track him down, thinking that Diane is with him, but his search is fruitless. He is told that Paul has not been there recently and no one knows where he is. Frank becomes so desperate to find Paul that he hires a private detective, and is in the process of being conned by him when Paul coincidentally turns up in Walford. He reveals that he had spent some time in America, and knows nothing of Diane's whereabouts. He feels guilty about the way he'd treated Diane and has come back to put things right. After some heavy interrogation from Frank, Paul reveals that he spoke to Diane on the day she ran away. She had asked to come to Leeds to see him, but Paul had refused and promised to come to Walford when he had more time. Frank eventually accepts that Paul is telling the truth.

Trevor is overjoyed to see Paul again, but his happiness is fleeting as Paul soon announces that he is leaving once again, and this time for good. Seeing how upset Trevor is about this, Paul asks him to join him in his home town of Leeds. Trevor gratefully accepts and leaves with Paul in March 1990.
