= Helena Breck =

British actor

- Occupation: Actor
- Known for: Voice of Tesco self-service checkouts
- Television: EastEnders

Helena Breck is a British actor, known for playing Elizabeth Willmott-Brown in the BBC soap opera EastEnders, and as the voice of NCR self-service checkout tills used in Asda, Sainsbury's and Tesco supermarkets, with phrases including "Unexpected item in bagging area".

In 2015, Tesco announced that recordings of her voice would be replaced by those of a male actor.

She also played Sandy McCormick in Triangle, another BBC soap opera, in 1981.
