= Cate Fowler =

Australian theatre director (born 1949)

Cate Fowler (born 13 June 1949 in Tumut, New South Wales, Australia) is a theatre producer and director specialising in work for children and families and an educationalist engaged in research in the areas of children's performance and creative literacies.

== Awards and recognition ==
Under Fowler's direction, Windmill was nominated for more than 28 Awards and won 15, including three national Helpmann Awards: two for Best Presentation for Children (Twinkle Twinkle Little Fish and Riverland) and one for Best Visual or Physical Theatre Production (Twinkle Twinkle Little Fish).

Fowler has also been the recipient of a number of awards which recognise her status in the arts community. These include the Australia Japan Arts Network (AJAN) Fellowship, Asialink three-month residency in Japan (1998/99); a 1999 Mathilda Award for contribution to early childhood theatre, Queensland Critics Circle; Asia-Pacific Woman of Distinction Award (Arts), Asia-Pacific Business Council for Women (2006); and the Woman of Achievement Award (Performing Arts), Zonta (2006).

In the January 2007 edition of the ABC's Limelight (Magazine), Cate Fowler was named as one of the 50 most influential Australians in the Arts for ensuring a generation of children have quality theatre entertainment.

== Screen appearances ==
In Charles and Diana: Unhappily Ever After (1992), Fowler played Princess Anne.
