= Elizabeth Kelly =

English actress (1921–2025)

- Kelly as Nellie Ellis in EastEnders
- Born: Elizabeth Hutton Kelly; 29 May 1921; Newcastle upon Tyne, Northumberland, England
- Died: 31 December 2025 (aged 104); Scarborough, North Yorkshire, England
- Occupation: Actress
- Years active: 1967–2007
- Television: EastEnders
- Spouse: Peter Trower (m. 1943; died 1968)
- Children: 2

Elizabeth Hutton Trower (née Kelly; 29 May 1921 – 31 December 2025) was an English actress. With a career spanning four decades in television and film, she was best known for portraying Nellie Ellis in the BBC soap opera EastEnders between 1993 and 1998, and again for a guest appearance in 2000.

== Early life ==
Elizabeth Hutton Kelly was born in Newcastle upon Tyne, Northumberland, on 29 May 1921, the daughter of Albert Edward Kelly (1889–1967), a shop keeper, and his wife, Elizabeth (née Tulip; 1890–1987), a housewife.

== Career ==
Kelly began her acting career in the late 1960s. She played Edie Burgess in the ITV soap opera Coronation Street in 1971 and went on to portray various roles in several televised drama series including The Bill, Boon, Spender, and Where the Heart Is, as well as the television film Cider with Rosie among others.

In 1993, Kelly joined the cast of the BBC soap opera EastEnders as Nellie Ellis, the interfering relative of Pauline Fowler, portraying the role until 1998, before returning briefly in 2000 for the funeral of Ethel Skinner (Gretchen Franklin). After leaving EastEnders, Kelly appeared in the ITV soap opera Emmerdale as Edith Weatherall in 2002, as well as appearing in episodes of The Inspector Lynley Mysteries, Steel River Blues and Heartbeat. Her final acting role was in The Royal in 2007.

== Personal life and death ==
In June 1943, she married businessman Peter Trower. He predeceased her on 30 January 1968, his 55th birthday. Together they had two children, a son and a daughter. Kelly had several grandchildren and great-grandchildren.

Kelly celebrated her 100th birthday in May 2021, and died of old age on 31 December 2025 at a care home in Scarborough, North Yorkshire, aged 104. Her death was announced to the public on 4 February 2026. Her funeral service took place at St Peter's Church, Scarborough on 17 February, followed by a private burial.

== Filmography ==
=== Film ===
Year	Title	Role	Notes
1980	The Savage Hunt	Lesly's Mother	
1988	Without a Clue	Landlady	
1993	The Making of '...And God Spoke'	Julie	
2002	24 Hour Party People	Ian's Gran	

=== Television ===
Year	Title	Role	Notes
1967	Magical Mystery Tour	Passenger on the Bus	Television film. Uncredited role
1968	City '68	Mrs. Burton	Episode: "In Memoriam"
1968	The War of Darkie Pilbeam	Nurse	Episode: "Phase III: August 1945"
1969	Coronation Street	Spokeswoman	1 episode
1970	A Family at War	Woman in Shelter	Episode: "If It's Got Your Number on It"
1970	The Sinners	Mrs. Whalan	Episode: "Dividends"
1971	Coronation Street	Edie Burgess	2 episodes
1971	A Family at War	Superintendent	Episode: "The Fundamental Things Apply"
1972	Home and Away	Gertie	Episode: "The Cold Wind Doth Blow"
1972	Holly	Mrs. Elliot	1 episode
1973	Shabby Tiger	Brewer	Episode: "Strawberries and Champagne"
1977	When the Boat Comes In	Shopper	Episode: "Letters from Afar"
1984	How We Used to Live	Emily Holroyd	4 episodes: "1902–1926"
1984	Miracles Take Longer	Mrs. Potter	2 episodes
1987	Grange Hill	Mrs. Hoskins	1 episode
1987	How We Used to Live	Charlotte Selby	Episode: "1954–1970: Easter Holiday (1958)"
1987	The Gemini Factor	Woman in Cafe	Episode: "Mirror Image"
1988	American Playhouse	Mary	3 episodes: "Strange Interlude: Parts 1–3"
1988	The Bill	Mrs. Paynter	Episode: "Getting Stressed"
1992	Motormouth	Mabel Church	1 episode
1992	Resnick: Lonely Hearts	Olive Peters	2 episodes
1992	Covington Cross	Mother Cecilia	Episode: "Outlaws"
1992	Boon	Lucy Keel	Episode: "Blackballed"
1993	Spender	Elderly Lady	Episode: "Bad Company"
1993	What's Up Doc?	Mrs. Sally Anderson	1 episode
1993	The Detectives	Mrs. Connors	Episode: "Go West Old Man"
1993–1998, 2000	EastEnders	Nellie Ellis	Series regular; 138 episodes
1995	That's Showbusiness	Herself - Panellist	1 episode
1998	Heartbeat	Ethel Simcox	Episode: "For Better or Worse"
1998	Cider with Rosie	Miss. Pimbury	Television film
1999	Tilly Trotter	Annie Trotter	Mini-series; 2 episodes
1999	Where the Heart Is	Maggie	Episode: "Not My Brother"
2001	The Bill	Mrs. Predota	Episode: "Greed"
2002	Rescue Me	Nan	4 episodes
2002	The Inspector Lynley Mysteries	Mrs. G	Episode: "For the Sake of Elena"
2002, 2005	Emmerdale	Edith Weatherall	Recurring role; 3 episodes
2004	Steel River Blues	Mrs. Hodge	Episode: "Bloody Fridays"
2004	Heartbeat	Mrs. Fry	Episode: "Fakers and Frauds"
2007	The Royal	Edith Taylor	Episode: "Can't Buy Me Love"

=== Radio ===
Year	Title	Role	Notes
1990	You Only Live Twice: The Radio Play	(voice)	BBC Radio 4 play; also online and video
