= Olga Lowe =

British actress (1919–2013)

- Born: 14 September 1919; Durban, South Africa
- Died: 2 September 2013 (aged 93)
- Occupation: Actress
- Years active: 1949–1997
- Spouses: John Tore (died 1959) Peter Todd (m. 1959; div. 1962) Keith Morris (m. 1970)

Olga Lowe (14 September 1919 – 2 September 2013) was a South African-born British film, stage and television actress. She made her film debut in an uncredited role in the 1949 film Trottie True. Described by The Stage as "an actress of extraordinary versatility," her credits included EastEnders, Where Eagles Dare, Carry On Abroad, Steptoe and Son Ride Again and The Riddle of the Sands.

== Biography ==
Lowe, who was of Russian Jewish descent on her father's side, was born in Durban, South Africa. Her father, Charles Lowe, led the Johannesburg Symphony Orchestra. She first moved to London from South Africa in 1935. She worked in Brazil as part of Carmen Miranda's cabaret, and in 1942 survived the torpedoing of her ocean liner, City of New York, by a German submarine whilst returning to South Africa.

After the Second World War, she returned to the United Kingdom and worked in regional rep, before appearing at the London Palladium, as a stooge to Harpo Marx, in 1949.

Lowe’s big break came in the original London production of the musical Pal Joey in 1954, in the small role of a reporter, performing the humorous song Zip. On the second night, her applause delayed the scene that followed by several minutes. Success continued the following year in the original London run of The Pajama Game at the Coliseum. Later stage work included Kenneth Branagh's production of Uncle Vanya at the Lyric, Hammersmith in 1991, and as part of Peter Hall's company at the Old Vic in 1997.

Lowe was a childhood friend of Carry On and Bless This House actor Sid James. Lowe and her first husband, John Tore, were considered to be instrumental in launching James' film career after he moved to Britain in 1947. In 1976, she was performing opposite James in The Mating Season at the Sunderland Empire Theatre on the night he suffered a fatal heart attack on stage.

== Personal life ==
Lowe was married three times. Her first husband, John Tore, died in 1959, aged 35. She married Peter Todd shortly after Tore's death; their marriage ended in divorce in 1962. In 1970, Lowe married actor Keith Morris; they remained together until her death in 2013.

== Death ==
Olga Lowe died on 2 September 2013 aged 93, only 12 days before her 94th birthday. She was survived by her third husband, Keith Morris.

== Partial filmography ==
- State Secret (1950) - Baba 'Robinson', taller singer
- Hotel Sahara (1951) - Fatima (uncredited)
- Stop the Merry-Go-Round (1952)
- So Little Time (1952) - Florine
- Oh... Rosalinda!! (1955) - Lady
- Where Eagles Dare (1968) - Lt. Anne-Marie Kernitser
- Carry On Abroad (1972) - Madame Fifi
- Steptoe and Son Ride Again (1973) - Percy's Wife
- The Final Programme (1973) - Hari (uncredited)
- The Clifton House Mystery (1978) - Myrna Spangler
- The Riddle of the Sands (1979) - Frau Dollmann
- Nijinsky (1980) - Signora Cecchetti
- Cous-cous (1996) - Rebecca (final film role)
