= Phil McDermott =

British actor

- Occupation(s): Actor; Priest (trainee) scrap metal worker weighbridge operator carpenter
- Known for: Trevor Short in EastEnders

Phil McDermott is a British actor. Before turning to acting he was a trainee priest, a scrap metal worker, a weighbridge operator and a carpenter. He is most famous for playing a regular character in the BBC soap opera EastEnders. He played the dim-witted odd-job man Trevor Short from 1989–1990. His character was one of many to be axed from the show in early 1990 following the introduction of the new executive-producer, Michael Ferguson.

Since leaving EastEnders McDermott has appeared in the children's situation comedy Dizzy Heights (BBC, 1991), which was set in a "wacky hotel".
