= Mark Thrippleton =

- Born: 13 July 1967 (age 57); Leeds, West Riding of Yorkshire, England
- Occupation: Actor
- Known for: Role of Paul Priestly in EastEnders

Mark Thrippleton (born 13 July 1967) is an English actor. He was born in and is from Leeds.

Thrippleton worked as a roofer and tiler before taking up acting in the 1980s.

In 1984 he appeared in How We Used to Live — a British educational drama tracing the lives and fortunes of fictional Yorkshire families from Ewardian times. He also played a young Joseph Stalin in the film Testimony (1988), which told the story of the Russian composer Dmitri Shostakovich.

Thrippleton is best known for playing the northern builder Paul Priestly in the BBC soap opera EastEnders. His character joined the show in 1989, but was one of many to be axed in 1990 following the introduction of the new executive-producer, Michael Ferguson.

Thrippleton has since been seen in the ITV soap opera Coronation Street, playing the minor role of Simon Hanson in 1997.
