= List of EastEnders characters introduced in 1997 =

EastEnders' logo

The following is a list of characters that first appeared in the BBC soap opera EastEnders in 1997, by order of first appearance. Many were introduced by the show's executive producer, Jane Harris.

== Neelam Kapoor ==
Neelam Kapoor
- EastEnders character
- Portrayed by: Jamila Massey
- Duration: 1997–1998
- First appearance: Episode 1417; 3 March 1997
- Last appearance: Episode 1646; 28 July 1998
In-universe information
- Occupation: Shop proprietor
- Sons: Sanjay Kapoor
- Granddaughters: Sharmilla Kapoor

Neelam Kapoor is played by Jamila Massey.

Neelam and her husband create a profitable clothing business and leave it in the hands of their son, Sanjay (Deepak Verma), in the late 1980s and emigrate to their native India. However, Sanjay proved to be a poor businessman and after some bad monetary investments, the business went bankrupt. Sanjay kept this from his parents and moved to Walford to open a clothing stall in 1993. In February 1997, Sanjay receives news that his father has died. He travels to India for the funeral and returns early in March with his mother following. Sanjay's wife Gita (Shobu Kapoor) is horrified, having always had a turbulent relationship with his interfering mother. She is furious that he has brought her to live with them without her consent. Neelam, sensing Gita's disapproval, goes out of her way to be as obliging as possible and she is understanding upon hearing the clothing business had floundered. Gita begrudgingly begins to accept Neelam's presence but finds her domineering mannerisms irksome.

Neelam helps with the running of the Kapoor's market stall, before buying the First Til Last grocery store in August 1997. Neelam is adamant that the shop should be run as a family business, and fires the resident shop assistant, Carol Jackson (Lindsey Coulson). Neelam continues to irritate Gita as the year continues by instructing her on the upbringing of her daughter, Sharmilla (Priya Bilkhu), and accusing her of being a bad wife to Sanjay. Sanjay allows Neelam to pamper him and cater to his every whim, which infuriates Gita further. By October Gita can take no more and decides to leave Walford with Sharmilla for a holiday with her sister, but not before telling Neelam a few home truths about Sanjay's adultery before departing. Neelam is appalled, but she is only too happy to believe her son when he claims Gita was merely lying. Gita and Sharmilla are due to return in January 1998, but they go missing in suspicious circumstances and the police suspect foul play. It transpires that Gita had merely run away after falling pregnant with another man's baby. Sanjay tracks her down and persuades her to return to Walford with Sharmilla and her new baby. Neelam is furious about Gita's immoral behaviour and will not condone Sanjay taking on another man's child as his own. She tries to convince him to divorce Gita and fight for the custody of Sharmilla. Sanjay defiantly refuses to do this, so Neelam sells her shop to Terry Raymond (Gavin Richards) and leaves Walford to live with her extended family in Bristol, disowning her son on the way out. Her last appearance is in July 1998.

== Courtney Mitchell ==
Courtney Mitchell
- EastEnders character
- Portrayed by: Charlotte Michaels (1997–1998); Carissa & Josephine O'Meara (1998–1999); Megan Jossa (2006); Alice Nokes (2016)
- Duration: 1997–1999, 2006, 2016
- First appearance: Episode 1421; 11 March 1997
- Last appearance: Episode 5348; 9 September 2016
- Introduced by: Jane Harris (1997); Kate Harwood (2006); Sean O'Connor (2016)
In-universe information
- Family: Mitchell
- Father: Grant Mitchell
- Mother: Tiffany Mitchell
- Stepmother: Carla Mitchell
- Half-brothers: Mark Fowler
- Grandfathers: Eric Mitchell; Terry Raymond
- Grandmothers: Peggy Mitchell; Louise Raymond
- Uncles: Phil Mitchell; Simon Raymond
- Aunts: Sam Mitchell
- First cousins: Ben Mitchell; Louise Mitchell; Ricky Branning; Raymond Dawkins; Albie Watts
- Other relatives: Sal Martin; Ronnie Mitchell; Roxy Mitchell; Billy Mitchell; Lola Pearce; Lexi Pearce; Charli Slater

Courtney Mitchell is the daughter of characters Grant Mitchell (Ross Kemp) and Tiffany Mitchell (Martine McCutcheon). From her on-screen birth in 1997 until 1998, Courtney is played by Charlotte Michaels. Identical twins Carissa and Josephine O'Meara later took over the role. The character was written out of the soap when Kemp decided to quit. When Grant and Courtney return in 2006, Courtney is played by Megan Jossa until they depart once again in June that year. Courtney made an unannounced return on 4 August 2016, played by Alice Nokes, and departed on 9 September 2016.

Courtney is born prematurely by caesarean section in March 1997. At first, it is unknown whether her father is Grant or Tony Hills (Mark Homer), but a DNA test reveals that Grant is her father. Grant and Tiffany separate and Tiffany is about to leave with Courtney on New Year's Eve 1998, but, while chasing Grant who has snatched Courtney, Tiffany is struck and killed by Frank Butcher's (Mike Reid) car. Grant and Courtney move to Rio de Janeiro in October 1999, and Courtney lives with her dad and stepmother Carla Mitchell (Christianne Oliveira).

Courtney returns to London on 27 March 2006 with Grant. Beyond mischievous, Courtney often refuses to do as she is told, backtalks, and argues with her cousin Ben Mitchell (Charlie Jones) which includes a schism between Peggy and Phil when the latter creates a family tree. Ben tells Courtney that her father killed her mother. Initially she refuses to believe Grant's claim that Tiffany's death was an accident. When Grant's wife Carla arrives, Courtney shows her blatant dislike. Grant decides that they should move to Portugal for a fresh start. But he dumps Carla on 9 June 2006 after discovering that she plans to fleece him and run off with another man, so only Grant and Courtney move to Portugal. In 2010, Courtney is heard on the phone to talking to her grandmother Peggy Mitchell (Barbara Windsor).

In August 2016, Courtney reads a text on Grant's phone from his sister-in-law and former wife, Sharon Mitchell (Letitia Dean), and meets her at a café, saying that Grant is not coming. Courtney asks why she and Grant were not invited to Peggy's funeral, to which Sharon says that they were. Courtney follows Sharon to the police station, where she sees Grant outside. Grant tells Courtney he got arrested for being drunk and rude to a police officer and takes an instant dislike to Belinda Peacock (Carli Norris) when Grant flirts with her. When they talk about the past, Grant tells Courtney that his brother Phil Mitchell (Steve McFadden) killed Peggy. Courtney storms off when Grant gets angry about her meeting Sharon. Annoyed with the lack of attention from Grant, Courtney refuses to let him stay with her. Courtney visits Phil and Sharon to see if they have heard from Grant as he owes her money, and Sharon gives Courtney some money. Courtney tells Sharon she knows what Phil did to Peggy, but Sharon tells her it is not true.

Courtney takes a liking to Mark Fowler (Ned Porteous), not knowing he is her half-brother, and they both admit at Shakil Kazemi's (Shaheen Jafargholi) party they like each other. Louise Mitchell (Tilly Keeper) tells Sharon about them, prompting her and Ian Beale (Adam Woodyatt) to find them. Sharon, Ian and Phil find out nothing happened between Courtney and Mark. Courtney and Louise merely become witnesses when the Mitchell house is being broken into in order for Ben and Jay Brown (Jamie Borthwick) to be kidnapped. Courtney and Louise both hide in the bedroom and in the midst of the panic, Courtney rings Grant for help during the struggle. Shortly afterwards Mark comforts Courtney only to be confronted by Grant who assumes he is one of the attackers. Grant tells Courtney that he is going back to Portugal and Courtney pretends not to care but later she catches up with Grant at the tube station and decides to go to Portugal with him.

=== Development ===
The character was originally played by infant Charlotte Mitchell from her on-screen birth until 1998. Mitchell was replaced by eighteen month old twins Carissa and Josephine O'Meara, after her persistent crying disrupted filming. A show spokesperson told Steven Murphy of Inside Soap that having twins play the role was better than relying on one baby all the time.

Jossa was surprised at her casting, saying: "I couldn't believe it when I heard I had got the part... it's going to be amazing and I can't wait." Described as "charming, intelligent yet spoilt", Courtney "loves being the centre of attention and hates sharing the spotlight with anyone".

Of her casting in 2016, Nokes said, "I was so excited [when I got the part]! To be a part of such an experienced cast and in one of the most renowned families in British soaps... it was a dream come true!" Nokes was unaware which part she was auditioning for as the scripts she was given had a different character's name. Nokes said that she is similar to Courtney, who is "very kind-hearted and very much like her mum, Tiffany. I think she's vulnerable but in an endearing way. However, Courtney is confident and likes to party!" She also added that Courtney "adores her dad and their relationship is strong. But I think she wants to hate him and teach him a lesson all the time. She feels like the adult in the relationship." Nokes confirmed she would appear in "a few episodes" and was not sure if she would return in the future, although Nokes seems keen to reprise the role on a full-time basis.

== Polly Becker ==
Polly Becker, played by Victoria Gould, is a journalist who turns up in Albert Square in March 1997 to report the local happenings for the Walford Gazette. Author Kate Lock has described Polly as "hard-bitten, cynical, ambitious" and someone who "never allowed sentiment to get in the way of a good story." As well as reporting on the scandalous private lives of a few Walford residents, Polly is embroiled in a love triangle storyline with bi-sexual Tony Hills (Mark Homer) and gay Simon Raymond (Andrew Lynford). Tony cheats on Simon with Polly and according to the BBC, "the way the show portrayed Tony coming to terms with his bisexuality was widely praised".

== Alex Healy ==
Alex Healy, played by Richard Driscoll, arrives in Walford as the local vicar. He runs a homeless shelter with the help of Christian follower Sarah Hills (Daniela Denby-Ashe), despite protests from many of the residents in Walford. Alex's most notable storyline is a love affair with Kathy Mitchell (Gillian Taylforth) who is married to Phil Mitchell (Steve McFadden). Discussing the storyline, Driscoll has suggested that Alex had been "wracked by emotional and spiritual turmoil ever since" sleeping with Kathy. He added, "Alex has got a lot of conflict. He's been suggesting to his father that he should work at his relationship with his wife – but there he is having an affair with a married woman. He feels a bit of a hypocrite – he feels guilty and ashamed. But the inescapable fact is he's attracted to Kathy. Something strange and wonderful happens to him when he's around her."

== Annie Palmer ==
Annie Palmer, played by Nadia Sawalha, is the daughter of George Palmer (Paul Moriarty), and arrives to help George manage his dodgy businesses. A ' tough-nut business woman', author Kate Lock has described her as "a rather terrifying creation, a kind of dominatrix without the dungeon. A verbal Miss Whiplash, she tore strips off anyone who crosses her." As well as managing various enterprises, Annie has a brief fling with Conor Flaherty (Seán Gleeson) and almost starts a relationship with Gianni di Marco (Marc Bannerman) until her father tells her that Gianni may be her half-brother. Annie later becomes involved with fellow businessman Steve Owen (Martin Kemp), but he eventually rejects her, leaving her humiliated.

== Vanessa Carlton ==
Vanessa Carlton
- EastEnders character
- Portrayed by: Adele Salem
- First appearance: Episode 1476; 15 July 1997
- Last appearance: Episode 1512; 2 October 1997
In-universe information
- Occupation: Business woman

Vanessa Carlton, played by Adele Salem, is a professional businesswoman who works for a property development company. Vanessa arrives at Deals on Wheels because she is looking for a reliable company like Evans Executive Cars to drive her company's clients round various commercial properties. Vanessa says she would like to speak to the owner Barry Evans, who is not present, but is telephoned by Robbie Jackson, to come to Deals on Wheels, as the only others present are Huw Edwards and Lenny Wallace. All three are trying to chat up Vanessa, but she is immediately wise to this and is not interested. When Barry arrives he and Vanessa go over to the Queen Victoria Public House for lunch to discuss potential business. Vanessa is most interested in the fact that Barry runs two businesses, (Deals on Wheels and Manor Wood), as Barry's father Roy Evans, has recently gone into semi-retirement and has handed the day-to-day running of the businesses over to Barry. She also seems interested that there is a lot of money involved in the businesses. Vanessa tells Barry that she has come to Evans Executive Cars as she has heard of their good reputation through one of her clients. Vanessa seems impressed and tells Barry that Evans Executive Cars has won the contract she is offering. A romance quickly develops between Vanessa and Barry. Vanessa is shown to be smart, intelligent, bi-lingual, classy and sophisticated and as such Vanessa appears to be out of Barry's league. Barry himself is aware of this and initially feels insecure around her, but his confidence eventually begins to grow. This helped by continued encouragement from Vanessa. Barry for his part cannot believe his luck that someone like himself has a partner like Vanessa and moves swiftly in terms of the romance.

== Lorna Cartwright ==
Lorna Cartwright, played by Janet Dibley, is an alcoholic who meets Phil Mitchell (Steve McFadden) at an AA meeting and becomes "attached to him"; they begin a torrid affair, which ends badly. Lorna's principal purpose was to break up the marriage of Phil and his wife Kathy (Gillian Taylforth), which eventually happens. After being absent from August 1997, Lorna reappears once again in February 1998, and a suicide bid by her helps to ruin Phil and Kathy's chance of patching up their marriage, and Kathy leaves for a new life in South Africa.

== Irene Raymond ==
Irene Raymond, played by Roberta Taylor, is the ex-wife of Ted Hills (Brian Croucher) and the estranged mother of Sarah and Tony Hills (Daniela Denby-Ashe and Mark Homer). Author Rupert Smith has stated that she is "flighty, bitchy and self-centred [...] the mother from hell", but has noted that she is a "breath of fresh air when compared to her ghastly children". Irene is instantly paired romantically with Terry Raymond (Gavin Richards), and Rupert Smith has suggested that in Terry, Irene "met her match in dreadfulness" and likens them to a "geriatric Romeo and Juliet". He goes on to say that, "separately, the Hills and Raymonds were disastrous, dysfunctional families. Joined together, as they were by Terry and Irene's distasteful romance, they were unbearable."

== Susan Rose ==
Susan Rose
- EastEnders character
- Portrayed by: Tilly Vosburgh
- Duration: 1997–1999
- First appearance: Episode 1493; 25 August 1997
- Last appearance: Episode 1737; 14 February 1999
In-universe information
- Brothers: Brian
- Husband: Michael Rose
- Sons: Matthew Rose

Susan Rose, played by Tilly Vosburgh, is the ex-wife of market inspector Michael Rose (Russell Floyd) and mother of Matthew Rose (Joe Absolom).

She arrives in Walford in 1997 along with her son Matthew. She has multiple sclerosis and Michael and Matthew end up caring for her. Michael and Susan's relationship takes an upward turn as a result of this and they soon rekindle their relationship. When a new market inspector Lisa Shaw (Lucy Benjamin) arrives in Walford in late 1998, Michael becomes attracted to her, and soon after, he and Lisa start an affair. Michael ends the affair with Lisa within weeks after Susan wants Michael to move away with her to Leeds. Susan and Michael leave Walford together in 1999 and Susan is unaware of Michael and Lisa's fling. Although Michael occasionally returns to Walford later in the year to support Matthew when he is on trial for the murder of Saskia Duncan (Deborah Sheridan-Taylor), Susan does not return and has not been seen since.

== Matthew Rose ==
Matthew Rose, played by Joe Absolom, is the son of Michael and Susan Rose (Russell Floyd and Tilly Vosburgh). Initially a sulky teenager, Matthew develops a friendship with club owner Steve Owen (Martin Kemp), and is present to witness Steve accidentally killing his ex-girlfriend Saskia Duncan (Deborah Sheridan-Taylor). A police investigation follows the discovery of Saskia's body, and Steve frames Matthew. Both Matthew and Steve stand trial for manslaughter. Steve is exonerated, but Matthew is found guilty and imprisoned.

== Julie Bates ==
Julie Bates (also Haye), played by Karen Henthorn, is the teacher of Clare Bates (Gemma Bissix). Julie falls in love with Clare's adoptive father, Nigel (Paul Bradley), whilst they are trying to sort the problematic youngster. A slow on/off romance develops between Nigel and Julie, but Nigel initially struggles with the guilt of moving on following the death of his wife a few years earlier. Faced with Nigel's uncertainty, Julie makes plans to leave Walford for a teaching job in Scotland; however, moments before she leaves, Nigel chooses to move to Scotland with her. They leave with Clare in April 1998.

== Conor Flaherty ==
Conor Flaherty, played by Seán Gleeson, is first seen when his aunt Pauline Fowler (Wendy Richard) tracks him and his mother Maggie (Olivia Shanley) down in Ireland. Conor, and his daughter Mary (Melanie Clark Pullen) move to Walford with Pauline. He falls for Ruth (Caroline Paterson), the wife of Pauline's son, Mark (Todd Carty). They eventually have an affair, leading to Ruth becoming pregnant with Conor's child.

== Mary Flaherty ==
Mary Flaherty, played by Melanie Clark Pullen, is the daughter of Conor (Seán Gleeson). When her relatives, the Fowlers, go to Ireland to meet her family, Mary sees a chance to escape her alcoholic, violent grandfather Sean (Pat Laffin), and moves to Walford with them and her father. Mary struggles to settle in Walford, despite having a fling with Joe Wicks (Paul Nicholls), and then later getting involved with Matthew Rose (Joe Absolom) and Robbie Jackson (Dean Gaffney).

== Maggie Flaherty ==
Maggie Flaherty, played by Olivia Shanley, is the sister of Pauline Fowler (Wendy Richard). Maggie was given up for adoption before Pauline was born, and Pauline only found out about Maggie years after their mother had died. Pauline and her family visit Maggie and her family in Ireland, and the sisters meet for the first time.

== Sean Flaherty ==
Sean Flaherty, played by Pat Laffin, is the husband of Maggie (Olivia Shanley). When Maggie's sister, Pauline Fowler (Wendy Richard) and her family visit Maggie, it becomes clear to them that Sean is an abusive drunk, who is particularly harsh towards Mary (Melanie Clark Pullen), his granddaughter.

== Eamonn Flaherty ==
Eamonn Flaherty, played by Maurice O'Donoghue, is the eldest son of Maggie and Sean Flaherty (Olivia Shanley and Pat Laffin). Eamonn is extremely loyal to his drunken father, and defends Sean's bullying to his long-lost cousin Ian Beale (Adam Woodyatt).

== Brenda Flaherty ==
Brenda Flaherty, played by Janet Behan, is the wife of Eamonn (Maurice O'Donoghue), and mother to his children. Mary (Melanie Clark Pullen), Brenda's niece, lets it be known that Brenda is lazy, smelly and needs to take a bath.

== Colette Flaherty ==
Colette Flaherty, played by Shiona Redmond, is the eldest daughter of Eamonn and Brenda Flaherty (Maurice O'Donoghue and Janet Behan). She has a brief holiday romance with her distant relative, Martin Fowler (James Alexandrou), whilst he and his family are visiting the Flahertys in Ireland.

== Gerry McCrae ==
Gerry McCrae, played by Simon O'Gorman, is a married man who is secretly having an affair with Mary Flaherty (Melanie Clark Pullen). He tells Mary he is leaving his wife to be with her, but she ends their relationship, and moves to Walford.

== Eamonn Flaherty Jnr ==
Eamonn Flaherty, played by Seán Walsh, is the son of Eamonn Snr and Brenda Flaherty (Maurice O'Donoghue and Janet Behan). He witnesses his sister, Colette (Shiona Redmond), kissing Martin Fowler (James Alexandrou).

== Jessie Moore ==
Jessie Moore
- EastEnders character
- Portrayed by: Chelsey Paden
- Duration: 1997–1998
- First appearance: Episode 1514; 7 October 1997
- Last appearance: Episode 1610; 5 May 1998
In-universe information
- Family: Fowler (foster)
- Mother: Nicole Moore
- Adoptive father: Mark Fowler (foster)
- Adoptive mother: Ruth Fowler (foster)

Jessie Moore, played by Chelsey Paden, had been put into foster care when her drug addict mother was imprisoned on remand for various offences. In October 1997 Jessie is housed with Mark and Ruth Fowler (Todd Carty and Caroline Paterson) in Walford. Six-year-old Jessie is a deeply troubled child, who is extremely shy and refuses to speak initially. She is also a bedwetter and Mark and Ruth seem unable to get her to open up to them, but they eventually manage to make progress and they become extremely attached to her.

In 1998, Jessie's mother, Nicole (Sara Stephens), telephones the Fowlers and asks for Jessie to visit her in prison. Mark refuses to allow this, but the social worker assures him that Nicole has completed her de-tox programme and that contact between her and Jessie is particularly important. Jessie visits and becomes excited to learn that Nicole will soon be released from prison. Nicole pays Jessie an impromptu visit on the day of her 7th birthday in February 1998. Nicole has found herself a bedsit and wants to take Jessie back. Mark and Ruth try to contest Nicole's decision, but they are told that reuniting children with their parents is what fostering is for. Nicole spends several weeks visiting Jessie to rebuild their relationship and eventually Ruth and Mark realise how close they are. They retract their opposition and Nicole gains custody but has to go to court for this (and loses access) as Ruth and Mark are pleased that Jessie chooses them.

== Ros Thorne ==
Ros Thorne
- EastEnders character
- Portrayed by: Clare Grogan
- Duration: 1997–1998
- First appearance: Episode 1525; 3 November 1997
- Last appearance: Episode 1599; 10 April 1998
In-universe information
- Occupation: Private investigator

Ros Thorne, played by Clare Grogan, is a Scottish private detective whom Ian Beale (Adam Woodyatt) hires to trace his two sons, Steven and Peter. Steven and Peter had been taken by their mother, Cindy (Michelle Collins), following her failed attempt to have Ian killed by a professional hitman in 1996.

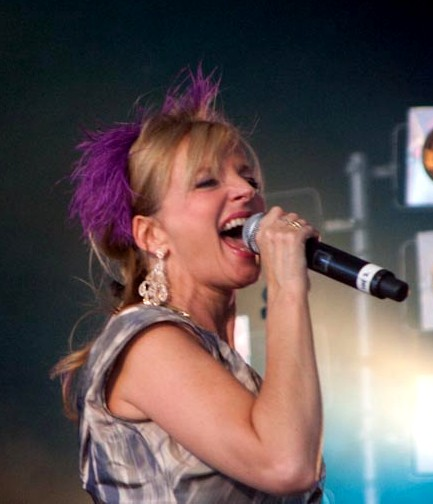
Clare Grogan portrayed the character.

Ian and Ros discover that Cindy is residing in Italy and follow her there in November 1997. While hunting for Cindy, Ian and Ros become attracted to each other. They have a brief sexual encounter, though their relationship never progresses into anything serious as Ian is preoccupied with his children. After days of searching, Ros eventually finds Cindy working in an Italian bar and she and Ian concoct a plan to abscond with Ian's children. They lure Cindy into a trap, while Phil and Grant Mitchell (Steve McFadden and Ross Kemp) kidnap Steven and Peter and bring them to the airport to reunite with their father. Despite a few hitches, Ian manages to bring the children safely back to Walford, with Cindy in pursuit.

Cindy threatens to take Ian to court for custody of the children. Ian continues to use Ros to investigate Cindy and her new partner, Nick Holland (Dominic Taylor)—a rich businessman who is funding the custody case. Ros also begins investigating Ian's hitman, John Valecue (Steve Weston), who is now being held in prison for an unrelated murder. Valecue is unwilling to admit that Cindy hired him to kill Ian, as his sentence will likely increase if he admits to his involvement. However, after Annie Palmer (Nadia Sawalha) threatens him with severe repercussions from her associates within the prison, Valecue eventually confesses. Cindy is arrested and imprisoned, and Ian is given custody of his children. Ros is not seen again following the completion of the case.

== Nick Holland ==
Nick Holland
- EastEnders character
- Portrayed by: Dominic Taylor
- Duration: 1997–1998
- First appearance: Episode 1530; 12 November 1997
- Last appearance: Episode 1599; 10 April 1998
In-universe information
- Occupation: Businessman
- Daughters: Cindy Williams
- Granddaughters: Beth Williams

Nick Holland, played by Dominic Taylor, first appears when Cindy Beale (Michelle Collins) meets him in Italy while on the run after escaping from Walford with her children. They become lovers, and Cindy becomes pregnant with his child. When Cindy's former husband Ian Beale (Adam Woodyatt) tracks her down and steals the children back from Cindy and returns to Walford, Nick at first tries to help Cindy and comes with her back to Walford to get custody of the children. During the custody trial, Cindy is arrested for the attempted murder of Ian, and Nick realises what Cindy is really like. Nick returns to Italy after the trial ends. Cindy later supposedly dies while giving birth to Cindy Williams in prison, but Nick never returns for his daughter, and she is brought up by her grandmother Bev Williams (Diane Langton) and aunt Gina Williams (Nicola Cowper). In 2014, Cindy has a daughter, Beth Williams, making Nick a grandfather.

== Josh Saunders ==
Josh Saunders
- EastEnders character
- Portrayed by: Jon Lee
- Duration: 1997–1998, 2026
- First appearance: Episode 1534; 18 November 1997
- Last appearance: Episode 7333; 20 May 2026
- Introduced by: Jane Harris (1997); Ben Wadey (2026)
In-universe information
- Occupation: Student
- Father: Eliot Saunders
- Mother: Julie Bates
- Stepfather: Nigel Bates

Josh Saunders is played by Jon Lee between 1997 and 1998, and returned for one episode in 2026.

Josh was introduced as part of a storyline to aid the departure of the long-running characters, Nigel (Paul Bradley) and Clare Bates (Gemma Bissix). Actor Paul Bradley had decided to leave the serial, reportedly for fear of being typecast. The writers of EastEnders wanted to give Nigel a happy ending, so a character named Julie Haye (Karen Henthorn) was invented to be a love interest for Nigel, whilst her son, Josh, was invented to be a love interest for Nigel's daughter, Clare.

In one storyline, Josh celebrates his Bar Mitzvah. Rabbi Jonathan Black, who made a cameo in the serial's episode involving the event said "Ardent fans will know Josh did not want to celebrate his Bar Mitzvah but his father Eliot Saunders (Lawrence Lambert) and mother Julie felt it was important for him. So did his girlfriend who persuaded him to go ahead with it. Josh lives with his mother who converted to Judaism in a progressive congregation when she married his father, though now they are separated. They come together for a party, though there is a certain tension in the air." Black added: "I very much hope that Josh will now continue with our post-Bar Mitzvah course."

Following his departure from the role, Lee went on to find success in S Club 7. He has said that he won a part in EastEnders "by complete accident really". He played the role of Josh for six months. As the storyline reaches its end, the Bates family join Josh and his mother for a new life in Scotland.

On 30 April 2026, it was announced Lee would reprise the role for the funeral of Nigel Bates. Speaking of his return, he stated: "It was quite surreal stepping back on to Albert Square after so many years as it’s so familiar to so many of us. It was lovely to see my onscreen family again." His return aired on 20 May 2026.

=== Storylines ===
Josh is first seen as a pupil rescuing Clare from a gang of bullies — her former friends who become her enemies after she refuses to socialise with them. Clare develops an instant crush on Josh, and she spends the following few weeks trying to impress him. They start dating, despite initial objections from Clare's adoptive father, Nigel. It transpires that Josh is actually the son of Clare's teacher, Julie. Clare is mortified by this initially, and she refuses to speak to Josh for a brief period. However, she soon comes to accept the situation and is even pleased when her father begins dating Josh's mother.

Josh finds himself caught in the middle of his warring parents — his father, Eliot, is furious when Julie announces that she is planning to move to Scotland with Josh in 1998. Eliot is Jewish, and Josh is obliged to have a Bar Mitzvah to appease his father before he leaves for Scotland. Josh is initially opposed to this, as he is not remotely interested in religion. He starts missing his Bar Mitzvah tutorials, which does not please his father, but he ultimately decides to go ahead with the Bar Mitzvah. It takes place in March 1998 and Clare is present as his guest. Nigel and Julie's relationship ends when Nigel begins to have second thoughts, and Julie and Josh leave Walford for Scotland in April 1998. Clare is upset to see Josh go, they say their goodbyes, but just at the last minute, Nigel changes his mind again, and asks Julie if he and Clare can move to Scotland with her and Josh. Clare is overjoyed and Josh and Julie return to collect Nigel and Clare a few weeks later.

Following Clare's return to Walford a decade later, in 2008, she reveals that as she had aged, Josh had taken her place in Nigel's affections. When Nigel dies in 2026, Josh returns for the funeral and comforts Julie.

== Chris Clarke ==
Chris Clarke
- EastEnders character
- Portrayed by: Matthew Jay Lewis
- Duration: 1997–1998
- First appearance: Episode 1542; 8 December 1997
- Last appearance: Episode 1650; 6 August 1998

Chris Clarke, portrayed by Matthew Jay Lewis, is a friend for Simon Raymond (Andrew Lynford) and love interest for Tony Hills (Mark Homer). He first appeared on 8 December 1997 and departed on 6 August 1998.

In April 1998, he attended the opening night party of Guisseppe's, a restaurant opened by the Di Marco family, which was named after their late father. Chris and Simon took Bruno di Marco (Leon Lissek) by surprise after they shared a kiss. In August 1998, Chris alongside Simon and Tony as well as Teresa di Marco (Leila Birch), Matthew Rose (Joe Absolom) and Mary Flaherty (Melanie Clark Pullen) went on a holiday on a canal boat on the Norfolk Broads.

== Jeff Healy ==
Jeff Healy
- EastEnders character
- Portrayed by: Leslie Schofield
- Duration: 1997–2000
- First appearance: Episode 1543; 9 December 1997
- Last appearance: Episode 1983; 3 August 2000
In-universe information
- Occupation: Handyman
- Wife: Jane Healy (backstory)
- Sons: Alex Healy
- Daughters: Mel Owen; Katie Healy
- Grandsons: Hunter Owen

Jeff Healy is played by Leslie Schofield. He was introduced in 1997 but was axed in 2000 by executive producer John Yorke.

Jeff is an atheist, who disapproves of his son, Alex (Richard Driscoll), being a vicar. He first arrives in Albert Square, after separating from his wife Jane Healy (Shirley Stelfox) in December 1997 to try and rebuild bridges with Alex. One of Jeff's daughters, Mel (Tamzin Outhwaite), makes a reappearance in his life and the three of them gradually begin living as a family again. Jeff has a brief courtship with Pauline Fowler (Wendy Richard) but is rejected when he proposes to her. Jeff leaves Walford in August 2000.

In 2019, he attends Mel's funeral off-screen.

== Other characters ==
Character	Date(s)	Actor	Circumstances
Mrs Barkworth	10 April	Ann Davies	The magistrate at Ricky Butcher's (Sid Owen) court case for handling stolen goods. A recent victim of car theft herself, she charges him £500 in court costs, as well as 180 hours of community service.
Richard Crowe	24 July, 26 July 1999	Simon Thomson	A police officer who first appears as the community liaison officer at a community meeting organised by Ian Beale (Adam Woodyatt). He later appears to present Dot Cotton (June Brown) with an award, after she foils an attempted burglary at the surgery. He notices that Dot has (inadvertently) been making tea from cannabis, and arrests her.
Jason	4 August	Robin Askwith	Speedway boss
Colin Rose	18 August	James Puddephatt	Michael Rose's (Russell Floyd) brother. He urges Michael to visit their mother (Norma Howard).
Mrs Rose	19 August 1997, 2 March 1998 (2 episodes)	Norma Howard	The mother of Michael (Russell Floyd) and Colin (James Puddephatt). Michael visits her and they discuss Michael's life, including the breakdown of Michael's marriage to Susan (Tilly Vosburgh) and his relationship with his son Matthew (Joe Absolom), much to his annoyance. Several months later, Mrs Rose arrives unexpectedly in the Square shortly after Michael and Susan have reconciled.
Brian	26 August	Uncredited	Susan Rose's (Tilly Vosburgh) brother. He appears when his nephew Matthew (Joe Absolom) meets his father Michael Rose (Russell Floyd).
Thomas	27–29 August, 6 November (3 episodes)	Robbie Gee	Diane Butcher's (Sophie Lawrence) Cameroonian musician boyfriend. He is present when Diane's brother Ricky Butcher (Sid Owen) and his wife Bianca (Patsy Palmer) stay with them at their apartment in Paris over the bank holiday weekend. Diane and Thomas's relationship is fraught with arguments. While at a meal, Thomas asks Ricky if he and Bianca will look after Diane's son Jacques (Jack Snell) while he and Diane go touring with his band. Ricky refuses and an angry Thomas leaves. Several weeks later, Diane arrives in London telling Ricky that Thomas has left her and Jacques and they stay with Ricky and Bianca for several months. Thomas arrives in London and asks Diane to meet him and invites her to go on tour in Africa with the band. The pair then reconcile, Thomas turns up in the square and they flee, leaving Jacques with Ricky and Bianca.
Marianne	29 August	Rosemary Martin	
Jamie	15–18 September (3 episodes)	Gregg Fitzgerald	
Patrick	22–25 September	Garrett Keogh	See EastEnders episodes in Ireland.
John Flaherty	23–25 September	Unknown	See EastEnders episodes in Ireland.
Declan Flaherty	23–25 September	Unknown	See EastEnders episodes in Ireland.
Carl Flaherty	23–25 September	Unknown	See EastEnders episodes in Ireland.
Kylie Flaherty	23–25 September	Unknown	See EastEnders episodes in Ireland.
Flynn	23–25 September	Noel O'Donovan	See EastEnders episodes in Ireland.
Hazel Foster	21 October	Jean Rimmer	The grandmother of Joe Wicks (Paul Nicholls). After Joe leaves Walford, Mary Flaherty (Melanie Clark Pullen) visits Hazel in Bolton to try to track him down.
Melanie Thomas	13–14 November	Ava Healy	Ian Beale's (Adam Woodyatt) opponent in the election for a seat on Walford Council. She wins the seat and later annoys Ian by approving Alex Healy's (Richard Driscoll) application for a shelter for homeless people in Bridge Street, called Bridge House, which Ian is strongly opposed to.
