= EastEnders episodes in Ireland =

Series of EastEnders episodes set in Ireland

- EastEnders episodes
- Martin, Ian, Ruth and Lucy arrive in Ireland.
- Episode nos.: Episodes 1507, 1508, and 1509
- Original air date: 22–25 September 1997
- Running time: 90 minutes (3x30)

Episode chronology
← Previous; Episode 1506	Next → Episode 1510

In 1997, the BBC soap opera EastEnders broadcast three singular transmissions that were filmed on location in Dublin, Ireland. The episodes involved the Fowler and Beale family travelling from London to Ireland to meet their long-lost relatives. The episodes were badly received by viewers and heavily criticised in the media. The BBC was inundated with complaints from angry viewers from Ireland for negative stereotyping, portraying Irish people as "dirty, rude, and drunk". Complaints were made by the Irish Embassy and there were fears that the episodes would have a negative effect on the Irish tourist trade. The BBC was forced to issue an apology for causing offence.

== Storyline development ==
In 1997, EastEnders aired a storyline in which the character Pauline Fowler (Wendy Richard) discovers that she has a long-lost sister, Maggie Flaherty (Olivia Shanley). In the storyline, Pauline's now-deceased mother Lou Beale had given Maggie up for adoption shortly after her birth, as she was born out of wedlock. Maggie is first said to be the result of an illicit affair Lou had with an Irishman 60 years earlier, but although Maggie is initially thought to be Pauline's half-sister, it later transpires that they share the same father too; Maggie was only the result of pre-marital sex between Lou and her husband-to-be, Albert Beale.

Pauline and various members of the Fowler and Beale family travel to Ireland to reunite with their long-lost relatives in a special week of episodes. The episodes were filmed on location in the countryside around County Dublin, away from the soap's typical filming location in Borehamwood, England. They were filmed over a period of two weeks in July and August 1997, and were broadcast on 22, 23 and 25 September 1997. In the three episodes, Pauline is accompanied by her sons Mark Fowler (Todd Carty) and Martin Fowler (James Alexandrou), Mark's wife Ruth Fowler (Caroline Paterson), nephew Ian Beale (Adam Woodyatt) and his daughter Lucy Beale (Casey Anne Rothery). Speaking about their trip to Dublin, actress Wendy Richard who played Pauline said "It's nice to be in Dublin for a change. It's not like London at all, where they take you a little bit for granted", and Todd Carty, who played her screen son Mark, said "It's also really nice to get out of Albert Square for a while to do something different."

A number of Irish actors were cast as Pauline's long-lost relatives, many of whom were starring in their first prominent television role. They included Maggie Flaherty, played by Olivia Shanley, son Conor (Sean Gleeson) and his headstrong daughter Mary (Melanie Clark Pullen). For the latter two characters, Conor and Mary, the Ireland episodes were only the beginning of their stint in EastEnders. Both characters remained in the serial as regulars, moving back to the soap's setting in Albert Square to be with the new-found family. They remained on-screen for two years. At the time of filming the Ireland episodes, Gleeson, from Thurles, County Tipperary, said, "The EastEnders cast are all really nice people", and Shanley said, "I've always been a big fan of EastEnders and to tell the truth I was a bit star struck [...] But they made us all feel very much at ease." Clark Pullen added, "I was expecting the cast to be luvvies but they were all brilliant – real grafters and totally down to earth. They were all very supportive as well and made me feel right at home. I was pretty starstruck [...] Wendy Richard who plays Pauline Fowler was great – she is the most wonderful woman and she quietly gave me advice on how to cope with the sudden fame and attention." They were also joined by a host of other characters, including Maggie's husband Sean (Pat Laffan), second son Eamonn (Maurice O'Donoghue), Eamonn's wife Brenda (Janet Behan) and daughter Colette (Shiona Redmond).

== Reception ==
The episodes were not well received by viewers or the media. The BBC and the programme makers were heavily criticised for the stereotypical way they portrayed Irish people. Viewers were angered by scenes that they felt portrayed Irish as resentful towards English, drunk, dirty, poor and rude – one scene showed a drunk man pouring beer over Pauline Fowler (later revealed to be her brother-in-law), and then demanding payment for the drink. Others were angered by the scriptwriters' decision to include various farm animals in a street scene on the outskirts of Dublin, with one viewer commenting to the Daily Mirror: "It was nothing like life in the real Ireland of today. When did you last see a donkey walking along our streets? The EastEnders production team haven't got a clue about modern Irish society; they are living in the Dark Ages."

The BBC and RTÉ (the Public Service Broadcaster of Ireland) received complaints from angry Irish people all over Britain and Ireland, and it was reported that viewers "bombarded" local and national radio stations, claiming the episodes were an insult to Irish people everywhere. Callers to Radio Ulster's Talkback programme and Gerry Ryan's morning talk show on RTÉ Radio, demanded that the scriptwriters be sacked. BBC contributor Mike Philpott described the show as "the worst case of stage 'Oirish' seen for a long time" and "one of the most shameful half-hour episodes in the history of British television".

The angry reaction stretched from official channels, such as the Irish Embassy, to holiday chiefs, who feared that the episodes would have a negative effect on tourist trade. The Irish Embassy in London said, "[EastEnders] has caused a great deal of upset and annoyance in the country [Ireland] and with Irish people in Britain." Furthermore, they suggested that the episodes "presented a prejudiced and stereotyped view of Ireland that [was] utterly unrecognisable." Ted Barrington, Ireland's ambassador to the UK, described the portrayal of Ireland as an "unrepresentative caricature", stating he was worried by the negative stereotypes and the images of drunkenness, backwardness and isolation. He added, "EastEnders is a powerful and very concentrated medium … People are upset at the caricature and misrepresentation of Ireland. Irish people can laugh at themselves but, the point is, this is one of the most popular programmes on British television, and it decided to present an image of Ireland that conforms to old-fashioned negative stereotypes. It selected an unrepresentative range of stereotypes. Cultural and racial stereotyping tends to create barriers between people."

Mark Mortell, the chairman of Ireland's national tourism development, Bord Fáilte, said: "I am enormously concerned that the single biggest television audience in Britain was shown a negative image of Irish hospitality … It has the potential to be enormously damaging." His colleague, John Lahiffe, added: "I am dismayed by the mischievous nature of it. We go to great efforts to promote this country, but it was in no way representative of Ireland."

Various Irish entertainers and sports personalities also went public with their opinions on the episodes. Broadcaster Gerry Kelly labelled the episodes racist, and an unmitigated disaster. The Irish actors, who were employed specifically for the storyline, were also criticised by Kelly for not speaking out against the scenes they were enacting. He accused them of selling out their heritage and denigrating their fellow-countrymen. Comic Brendan O'Carroll said, "Whoever wrote the script has obviously never been to Ireland. I'm very disappointed because EastEnders is a programme I have great respect for. It is outrageous and untrue to portray us like that. I'm disappointed the producers allowed it to be broadcast as it was." Former jockey and TV presenter Declan Murphy said, "It's wrong and disgraceful when writers portray everyone from Ireland as backward drunks. I am an Irishman and I'm proud of it, but I'm not a drunk and I'm certainly not backward and neither are my compatriots." Actor Garret Keogh, who played an "ignorant" Irish hotel owner in the EastEnders episodes, revealed: "The streets around Cabra, where I live, are hopping. I went down to get the paper and some bread and I was accosted. The script has stirred up a hell of a hornets' nest here. I'm only an actor, but I wouldn't want to do anything that would be demeaning to me, my people or my country." However, actor Dermot Morgan urged Irish people not to over-react: "I'm sure there's no great conspiracy against Irish people here. The BBC have a good track record and this would seem to be a dodgy storyline that has somehow crept through. As for being drunks, surely they must only mean on a Saturday night!"

Complaints were upheld by the British Broadcasting Standards Commission, who said "the intention was positive rather than negative but the result was clumsy and irritating". The BBC said, "EastEnders has a reputation for showing slices of life in many different ways and sometimes these are not flattering", but they admitted that the episodes were "ill-judged" and issued a public apology for causing offence and misrepresenting Irish people. Jana Bennett, the BBC's then director of production, stated on BBC1's news bulletin: "It is clear that a significant number of viewers have been upset by the recent episodes of EastEnders, and we are very sorry, because the production team and programme makers did not mean to cause any offence." A year later, in 1998, BBC chairman Christopher Bland admitted that as result of the Irish-set EastEnders episodes, the station failed in its pledge to represent all groups accurately and avoid reinforcing prejudice.

== Characters introduced ==
=== Flaherty family ===
Albert Beale	Lou Beale
Sean Flaherty	Maggie Flaherty
Conor Flaherty	Geraldine Flaherty	Eamonn Flaherty	Brenda Flaherty	Thomas Flaherty	John Flaherty
Mary Flaherty	Colette Flaherty	Eamonn Flaherty Jnr	Declan Flaherty	Kylie Flaherty	Carl Flaherty

==== Maggie Flaherty ====
Maggie Flaherty
- EastEnders character
- Portrayed by: Olivia Shanley
- First appearance: 22 September 1997
- Last appearance: 25 September 1997
In-universe information
- Occupation: Housewife
- Family: Beale
- Father: Albert Beale
- Mother: Lou Beale
- Brothers: Harry Beale; Ronnie Beale; Kenny Beale; Pete Beale
- Sisters: Norma Beale; Pauline Fowler
- Husband: Sean Flaherty (until 2019)
- Sons: Eamonn Flaherty; Conor Flaherty; John Flaherty; Tommy Flaherty
- Grandsons: Eamonn Flaherty Jnr; Declan Flaherty; Carl Flaherty
- Granddaughters: Colette Flaherty; Kylie Flaherty; Mary Flaherty
- Nephews: Ian Beale; Mark Fowler; Martin Fowler

Margaret "Maggie" Flaherty is the illegitimate child of Lou (Anna Wing) and Albert Beale (Gary Olsen), before they married. She was given up for adoption, as she was born out of wedlock, and was sent to live with a family in Ireland. She was adopted by the O'Carroll family.

In 1996, eight years after Lou's death in 1988, her youngest daughter Pauline (Wendy Richard) finds a letter from Lou to her best friend Ethel (Gretchen Franklin), revealing that she had a secret daughter. Pauline and her family try to find Maggie, and when they do, they visit her in Kilmoneen, Ireland.

Whilst in Ireland, Maggie's lecherous husband Sean (Pat Laffin) flirts with Pauline, and is abusive to his granddaughter, Mary (Melanie Clark Pullen). When Pauline and her family leave, taking Mary with them, she begs Maggie to leave Sean and return to Walford with her, but Maggie decides to stay and look after her vast family. This is the last time she is seen.

Her grown up family send a wreath to Pauline's funeral in 2006 and Maggie herself sends flowers and a condolence message to her nephew Ian Beale (Adam Woodyatt), when his daughter Lucy (Hetti Bywater) dies in 2014.

In April 2019, Martin Fowler (James Bye) goes to Ireland to attend her funeral.

==== Sean Flaherty ====
Sean Flaherty
- EastEnders character
- Portrayed by: Pat Laffin
- First appearance: 22 September 1997
- Last appearance: 25 September 1997
In-universe information
- Wife: Maggie Flaherty (until 2019)
- Sons: Eamonn Flaherty; Conor Flaherty; John Flaherty; Tommy Flaherty
- Grandsons: Eamonn Flaherty Jnr; Declan Flaherty; Carl Flaherty
- Granddaughters: Colette Flaherty; Kylie Flaherty; Mary Flaherty

Sean Flaherty, portrayed by Pat Laffin, is first seen as a lecherous drunk in a pub in the Irish village of Kilmoneen. Sean leers over Pauline Fowler (Wendy Richard)'s breasts and tries to buy her a drink, only to be told to leave her alone by Ian Beale (Adam Woodyatt). He later goes over to Pauline and tries to touch her, spilling stout on her. He is then thrown out of the bar.

Later, when Pauline is at Maggie's house, and her eldest son Eamonn brings his father home, Pauline is shocked to see that Maggie was married to Sean.

Eamonn later tells Sean of his granddaughter Mary (Melanie Clark Pullen)'s affair with married man Gerry McCrae. Maggie races to Mary's school to collect her before violent Sean can get to her. She begs Pauline to take Mary back to Walford with her. Pauline gets Sean drunk until he falls asleep and then helps Maggie pack Mary's clothes.

As Pauline, Mary and the family leave Kilmoneen, Sean staggers into the road to try to stop the car, and stop Mary from leaving. Mark (Todd Carty) gets out of the car and punches Sean in the groin, and they speed off in the car, leaving Sean doubled over in pain.

==== Conor Flaherty ====
Conor Flaherty, played by Seán Gleeson, is Pauline Fowler (Wendy Richard)'s nephew – the son of her long-lost sister Maggie and her husband Sean. Conor also has a daughter, Mary Flaherty (Melanie Clark Pullen), from his first marriage but he doesn't get on with her. When Mary decides she wants to move to Walford with Pauline, Conor also follows her.

==== Mary Flaherty ====
Mary Flaherty, played by Melanie Clark Pullen, is the daughter of Conor Flaherty (Seán Gleeson). Mary is having an affair with an older married man, Gerry McCrae. She decides to move to Walford with the Fowlers to escape her alcoholic, violent grandfather, Sean, who finds out about her affair. Her father also follows her.

==== Eamonn Flaherty ====
Eamonn Flaherty
- EastEnders character
- Portrayed by: Maurice O'Donoghue
- First appearance: 22 September 1997
- Last appearance: 25 September 1997
In-universe information
- Family: Beale
- Father: Sean Flaherty
- Mother: Maggie Flaherty
- Brothers: Conor Flaherty; John Flaherty; Tommy Flaherty
- Wife: Brenda Flaherty
- Sons: Eamonn Flaherty Jnr; Declan Flaherty; Carl Flaherty
- Daughters: Colette Flaherty; Kylie Flaherty
- Grandfathers: Albert Beale
- Grandmothers: Lou Beale
- Aunts: Pauline Fowler
- Nieces: Mary Flaherty
- First cousins: Ian Beale; Mark Fowler; Martin Fowler

Eamonn Flaherty, portrayed by Maurice O'Donoghue, is Pauline Fowler (Wendy Richard)'s nephew – the eldest son of her long-lost sister Maggie and her husband Sean.

Eamonn is unwelcoming to his long-lost relatives, and extremely loyal to his drunken father. He defends his father's bullying to his long-lost cousin Ian Beale (Adam Woodyatt), and they nearly come to blows because of this. According to the Kilmoneen hotelier, Patrick, Eamonn had been on the receiving end of his father's abuse as a child and was severely whipped with a belt for stealing chocolate. Patrick comments, "you don't break the commandments, not in Sean's house". Even though he is of aware of the potential repercussions, Eamonn informs his father that his niece Mary (Melanie Clark Pullen) has been having an affair with a married man, and Sean is furious. Maggie fears for her safety, so she sends her to London to live with Pauline.

==== Brenda Flaherty ====
Brenda Flaherty
- EastEnders character
- Portrayed by: Janet Behan
- First appearance: 22 September 1997
- Last appearance: 25 September 1997
In-universe information
- Husband: Eamonn Flaherty
- Sons: Eamonn Flaherty Jnr; Declan Flaherty; Carl Flaherty
- Daughters: Colette Flaherty; Kylie Flaherty

Brenda Flaherty, portrayed by Janet Behan, is Maggie's daughter-in-law, married to her son Eamonn, and mother to his children, Colette, Eamonn and Kylie.

She is sent to collect Pauline Fowler (Wendy Richard) and her family and takes them to meet Maggie.

She is lazy and smelly; Mary (Melanie Clark Pullen) says she needs a bath. She is too lazy to collect her son, Eamonn, from choir practice, and sends Martin (James Alexandrou) and Colette to get him.

==== Colette Flaherty ====
Colette Flaherty
- EastEnders character
- Portrayed by: Shiona Redmond
- First appearance: 22 September 1997
- Last appearance: 25 September 1997
In-universe information
- Family: Beale
- Father: Eamonn Flaherty
- Mother: Brenda Flaherty
- Brothers: Eamonn Flaherty Jnr; Declan Flaherty; Carl Flaherty
- Sisters: Kylie Flaherty
- Grandfathers: Sean Flaherty
- Grandmothers: Maggie Flaherty
- Uncles: Conor Flaherty; John Flaherty; Tommy Flaherty
- First cousins: Mary Flaherty
- Other relatives: Pauline Fowler; Ian Beale; Mark Fowler; Martin Fowler

Colette Flaherty, portrayed by Shiona Redmond, is the eldest daughter of Eamonn and Brenda Flaherty.

Colette is the same age as her first cousin once removed, Martin Fowler (James Alexandrou), and the pair hit it off. This is only a holiday romance however, as Martin leaves with his family the following week. Colette hasn't been seen or heard from since.

==== Eamonn Flaherty Jnr ====
Eamonn Flaherty
- EastEnders character
- Portrayed by: Seán Walsh
- First appearance: 23 September 1997
- Last appearance: 25 September 1997
In-universe information
- Occupation: Choir boy
- Family: Beale
- Father: Eamonn Flaherty
- Mother: Brenda Flaherty
- Brothers: Declan Flaherty; Carl Flaherty
- Sisters: Colette Flaherty; Kylie Flaherty
- Grandfathers: Sean Flaherty
- Grandmothers: Maggie Flaherty
- Uncles: Conor Flaherty; John Flaherty; Tommy Flaherty
- First cousins: Mary Flaherty
- Other relatives: Pauline Fowler; Ian Beale; Mark Fowler; Martin Fowler

Eamonn Flaherty, played by Seán Walsh, is the son of Eamonn (after whom he was named) and Brenda Flaherty. Eamonn is witness to the first kiss between his sister Colette and Martin Fowler (James Alexandrou), when they go to collect him from choir practice.

==== Other family members ====
Character(s)	Circumstances
John Flaherty	Son of Sean and Maggie Flaherty. He works as a labourer, using a road drill. He never speaks, which his niece Mary (Melanie Clark Pullen) says she doesn't mind, as the house is noisy enough as it is. She later says she thinks he had had a lobotomy.
Declan Flaherty	The middle child of Eamonn and Brenda Flaherty. He is not old enough to go to school. His mother nags his grandmother, Maggie, to make dinner sooner so that Declan can go out, which she does, leaving Pauline Fowler (Wendy Richard) worried about Maggie's family treating her as a slave.
Carl Flaherty	The youngest of Eamonn and Brenda Flaherty's five children. He is mischievous, always running around with his elder sister Kylie, getting under everyone else's feet.
Kylie Flaherty	Youngest daughter of Eamonn and Brenda Flaherty, the fourth of their five children. She runs around a lot with her younger brother, Carl, getting under everyone's feet. She takes a telephone message from her uncle Conor (Seán Gleeson), saying that he will be back late from fishing with Ruth Fowler (Caroline Paterson) and Lucy Beale (Casey Anne Rothery), but fails to pass it on, sparking a huge search for them.

=== Other characters ===
==== Gerry McCrae ====
Gerry McCrae
- EastEnders character
- Portrayed by: Simon O'Gorman
- First appearance: 22 September 1997
- Last appearance: 23 September 1997
In-universe information
- Occupation: Shopkeeper

Gerry McCrae is the shopkeeper in Kilmoneen, the Irish village where the Flaherty family live.

Gerry is a married man, but is secretly having an affair with Mary Flaherty (Melanie Clark Pullen). He tells Mary he is leaving his wife to be with her, but Mary ends their relationship publicly, and the local bartender, Patrick Garrett Keogh), hears their argument and tells Mary's uncle, Eamonn (Maurice O'Donoghue). Eamonn cannot wait to tell his violent, alcoholic father Sean (Pat Laffin), which leads to Mary's departure from the village, scared of what Sean will do to her.

Character(s)	Actor	Circumstances
Patrick	Garrett Keogh	The hotelier and pub landlord in Kilmoneen village. He refuses to let the Fowlers stay at his hotel initially, as he has booked their rooms under the name "Towler". He knows the Flahertys and mediates between them and the Fowlers when they get into arguments.
Flynn	Noel O'Donovan	A fisherman who refuses to let Conor, Ruth and Lucy use his boat. Conor takes it anyway, but the tide turns and they cannot get back to the dock. Sea rescue is called out to search for them.

== See also ==
- Kat & Alfie: Redwater
