= Maggie Flaherty =

Maggie Flaherty may refer to:

- Maggie Flaherty (EastEnders)
- Maggie Flaherty (ice hockey)
