= Mary Flaherty (EastEnders) =

Fictional character from the BBC soap opera EastEnders

- EastEnders character
- Portrayed by: Melanie Clark Pullen
- Duration: 1997–1999
- First appearance: Episode 1507; 22 September 1997
- Last appearance: Episode 1742; 23 February 1999
In-universe information
- Occupation: Barmaid
- Family: Beale
- Father: Conor Flaherty
- Mother: Geraldine Flaherty
- Grandfathers: Sean Flaherty
- Grandmothers: Maggie Flaherty
- Uncles: Eamonn Flaherty; John Flaherty; Tommy Flaherty
- First cousins: Colette Flaherty; Eamonn Flaherty Jr.; Declan Flaherty; Carl Flaherty; Kylie Flaherty
- Other relatives: Pauline Fowler; Ian Beale; Mark Fowler; Martin Fowler

Mary Flaherty is a fictional character from the BBC soap opera EastEnders, played by Melanie Clark Pullen, from 22 September 1997 to 23 February 1999. Her first appearance is in a special week of episodes set in Ireland, first broadcast in 1997.

== Creation and development ==
In July 1997, EastEnders producers announced that they were to extend the Beale/Fowler family in an "amazing" storyline that would see one of the soap's original characters, Pauline Fowler (Wendy Richard), discover that her mother, Lou Beale (Anna Wing) gave birth to an illegitimate child, back in 1933. It was also said that she was to travel to Ireland with other members of her family to meet her secret sister, Maggie Flaherty (Olivia Shanley), in "sensational episodes". When there, the Beale/Fowler family are introduced to Maggie's son and Mary's father, Conor Flaherty (Seán Gleeson), and him and Mary return home with them, though it was only originally announced that Mary would be permanent, and not Conor, as they wanted to keep details "tight-lipped". Richie Taylor of the Daily Mirror said on Melanie Clark Pullen's casting as Mary that "it will be a huge break for Melanie, 23, who finished college only earlier this year and will make her screen debut in the series."

In November, 2000, Clark Pullen revealed that becoming a celebrity sent her "spiraling into depression". She said "The whole thing terrified the life out of me. It was a real baptism of fire and quite unnerving. I didn't quite know what I was letting myself in for. Coming from Blackrock, near Dublin, I just didn't realise what an obsession EastEnders is over in England. I found it extremely difficult adjusting to London. I didn't know my way around, but everyone knew me. I would ask the way to Marks & Spencers and get: 'Oh, my God—it's Mary off the telly'. 'And I'd get 16-year-old boys going: 'Hello Mary, I'll show you a good time'. I started to suffer panic attacks and felt increasingly isolated. It was worse coming straight from Ireland." She added that it was scary because Ireland and England have different senses of humour.

== Storylines ==
The fictional character Mary is the granddaughter of Maggie Flaherty (Olivia Shanley), Pauline Fowler's (Wendy Richard) long-lost sister. Her father is Conor (Seán Gleeson), but she doesn't get on with him. When the Fowlers go to Ireland to meet their relatives, Mary is a teenager in trouble. Although she is shown to have a level head on her shoulders, she is having an affair with an older married man, Gerry McCrae (Simon O'Gorman). Mary finds a good friend in her cousin Mark (Todd Carty), and decides to move Walford, and their relationship improves over time. Pauline initially likes Mary, often remarking that she is like a younger version of her mother, but they cannot live in the same house and Mary often has to find new accommodations. Mary also comes between couple Joe Wicks (Paul Nicholls) and Sarah Hills (Daniela Denby-Ashe), but Joe returns to Sarah after they have a one-night stand, breaking her heart. Mary breaks her pelvis whilst on holiday in Norfolk and then gets involved with Matthew Rose (Joe Absolom) and Robbie Jackson (Dean Gaffney), before leaving Walford with her father, Conor, and his pregnant lover, Mark's wife Ruth Fowler (Caroline Paterson).

== Reception ==
Just ahead of Conor and Mary's exit, Merle Brown from Scottish newspaper, the Daily Record, commented that Conor and Mary were "two of the most irritating characters" in the soap, and she was not happy that they were moving to Scotland.
