= Beale family =

Fictional family from EastEnders

- EastEnders family
- The original Beales and Fowlers as shown in 1985 (top) Michelle, Mark and Ian; (bottom) Arthur, Pauline, Lou, Kathy and Pete
- First appearance: Episode 1; 19 February 1985
- Created by: Tony Holland and Julia Smith
- Introduced by: Julia Smith
- Duration: 1985–present
- Spin-offs: "CivvyStreet"

The Beales and the Fowlers are a fictional family in the BBC soap opera EastEnders. They were the main family for storylines in early episodes of EastEnders, and remained as such ever since. With at least one member of the family having been a member of the cast from the first episode in February 1985, they are the show's longest serving family. The original Beale/Fowler family consisted of matriarch Lou Beale (Anna Wing) and her children Pete (Peter Dean) and Pauline (Wendy Richard), alongside their families including their children Ian (Adam Woodyatt), Mark (David Scarboro/Todd Carty), Michelle (Susan Tully/Jenna Russell) and their spouses Kathy Hills (Gillian Taylforth) and Arthur Fowler (Bill Treacher). Additionally, several members of the family have been introduced at a later point, including Pauline and Arthur's son Martin (Jon Peyton-Price/James Alexandrou/James Bye) who was the first baby to be born into the show in 1985. The family has been headed with a matriarch first seen with Lou, and over the years, Lou's daughter Pauline, Ian's wife Jane Collins (Laurie Brett) and more recently Pete's wife Kathy, have filled this role.

The Beale family have been rejuvenated several times. In 2004, Peter Beale and Lucy Beale were recast to give them a more mature look. By 2007, there were few members of the Beale family left and no Fowlers, so the family were revamped. Peter was recast again. Ian Beale (Adam Woodyatt) started a relationship with Jane (Laurie Brett), who later became his wife, and Steven Beale (Aaron Sidwell) also returned. By 2012, the number of Beales had fallen again. Lucy, Peter and Bobby were recast and Cindy Williams Jnr (Mimi Keene), Lucy and Peter's half-sister, was reintroduced. In addition to this, in early 2014 Bex Fowler (Jasmine Armfield) returned to the serial with her mother Sonia Fowler (Natalie Cassidy), with Martin Fowler (James Bye) following 11 months later in December. In 2014, Lucy (Hetti Bywater) is murdered, causing her family and friends to struggle to come to terms with her death and the secrets she left behind, putting many people in the frame for her murder. The same year, Cindy Jnr becomes the centre of a teenage pregnancy storyline when she gives birth to a daughter, Beth Williams. It was revealed in the live broadcast on 19 February 2015 that she was killed by her own 11-year-old half-brother, Bobby. It was also revealed that Kathy Beale (Gillian Taylforth), who was presumed dead in 2006, was alive after having faked her death with her new husband in South Africa. In December 2016, Michelle Fowler returned to Albert Square after originally leaving in 1995, although now played by Jenna Russell. Susan Tully, the original actress, had turned down many previous offers to return to the show, having since giving up acting to work as a director. In 2019, Bobby Beale was reintroduced with new actor Clay Milner Russell taking over the role. In 2020, Peter Beale was recast for the seventh time with new actor Dayle Hudson playing the role; Thomas Law resumed the role in June 2023. In March 2025, Vicki Fowler was reintroduced with Alice Haig taking over the role. In January 2026, the role of Mark Fowler Jnr was recast to Stephen Aaron-Sipple.

The Beales and Fowlers are one of EastEnders most iconic families and have been a major part of the show since its inception in 1985. They have been known for their ownership and occupation of some of the Square's businesses including a café, launderette and a fruit stall which have become historical references to show. The Beales and Fowlers are characterised as a traditional "East-end family" and have been known for representing the show in some of its classical storylines, bringing the show some of its highest viewers. These include their rivalry with the Watts, Mitchell and Branning families, shady publican Den Watts (Leslie Grantham) impregnating 16-year-old Michelle Fowler (Susan Tully) leading to the birth of their daughter Vicki, Mark Fowler (Todd Carty) revealing his HIV diagnosis, Arthur Fowler's (Bill Treacher) affair with Christine Hewitt (Elizabeth Power) and later being wrongly imprisoned for embezzlement, Ian's wife Cindy's (Michelle Collins) affair with his half-brother David Wicks (Michael French) and Ian later being shot by a hitman hired by Cindy, Mel Healy (Tamzin Outhwaite) jilting Ian at the turn of the millennium, Martin Fowler (James Alexandrou) impregnating Sonia Jackson (Natalie Cassidy) at fifteen, Pauline's death, Ian's mental breakdown and homelessness, Lucy Beale (Hetti Bywater) being murdered by her younger brother Bobby (Eliot Carrington), Kathy and Cindy's returns after being presumed dead, Kathy attacking Cindy on Christmas 2024, Cindy shooting Ian, and Martin's death after being crushed following an explosion at the Queen Vic during the 40th anniversary.

Members of the Beale family currently in EastEnders as of 2026 include Ian, Peter, his sons Louie (Jake McNally) and Jimmy Beale, and Michelle's children Vicki (Alice Haig) and Mark Fowler Jnr (Stephen Aaron-Sipple). Additionally, several others may be considered Beales through marriage; Ian's mother and Pete's ex-wife Kathy, his niece Lexi Pearce (Isabella Brown), and Peter's wife Lauren Branning (Jacqueline Jossa) are also among these. Lily Slater (Lillia Turner) has Martin as her adoptive father. Ian's ex-wife Cindy is also considered a member of the family.

== Creation ==
The Beale and Fowler family were one of the shows original family. The family was created by Tony Holland, who based the characters on his own family. He was involved in the casting of the family, approaching Wendy Richard to play Pauline Fowler, who thought she would be "too glamorous". Gillian Taylforth originally auditioned for the part of Sue Osman, but was called back for the role of Kathy Beale, however producers did not think she "looked old enough to have a son of 14. Eventually, they decided that if Pete had been Kathy's first boyfriend, it could work". Bill Treacher was the first person to be cast in the show as Arthur Fowler and Julia Smith wrote the part of Arthur with Treacher in mind. Peter Dean was originally cast as Den Watts, whilst Leslie Grantham was cast as Pete Beale, but "then the producers switched the roles around because I [Dean] was used to working in the market". Adam Woodyatt auditioned for the role of Ian Beale aged 16 in July 1984, after missing the first audition in May 1984. In July 1985, Pauline and Arthur's new baby son, Martin Fowler, was introduced and played by Jon Peyton Price; Peyton Price remained in the role until 1996 when James Alexandrou took on the part. In May 1986, Michelle and Den Watts' daughter Vicki Fowler through a whodunit teenage pregnancy. Emma Herry portrayed Vicki until 1988 when her family moved to Scotland and Samantha Leigh Martin played Vicki until 1995 when Tully chose to leave EastEnders.

From 1994, with EastEnders was airing three episodes per week, and a number of new characters were introduced around this time. Amongst these was David Wicks, played by Michael French, the eldest son of Pete, and Ian's half-brother, from his marriage to Pat some 30 years earlier. Patsy Palmer was cast as Bianca Jackson, who was unknowingly the daughter of David. Lucy and Peter were introduced as the twin children of Ian and Cindy Beale, born in December 1993 played by Eva and Francis Brittin-Snell.

Pete Beale, meanwhile, had made his final appearance in May 1993 and news of his death in a car crash reached Albert Square seven months later. Arthur Fowler, his brother-in-law, died suddenly in May 1996. Pete and Pauline's mother Lou died of natural causes in the summer of 1988.

In 1996, Casey Anne Rothery and Alex Stevens took on the roles of Lucy and Peter, however, Peter was recast in 1998 to Joseph Shade. Rothery and Shade remained in the show until 2004, when the characters were recast to Melissa Suffield and James Martin. Thomas Law took over from Martin in 2006 and he and Suffield remained until 2010. Paul Nicholls first appeared in 1996 as Joe Wicks, the son of David. In 2000, Chloe Jackson was introduced as the daughter of teenagers Sonia Jackson, played by Natalie Cassidy, and Martin Fowler – although Martin was not revealed as the father until several weeks after Sonia unexpectedly gave birth. The storyline culminates in Chloe being adopted and the character being renamed Rebecca.

In 2011, it was announced that Hetti Bywater would be playing the role of Lucy from January 2012. Peter returned in 2013, played by Ben Hardy. Bobby was recast to Rory Stroud and Mimi Keene joined the show as Cindy Beale's youngest daughter, Cindy. Bosses described Cindy as a "magnet for trouble" and "shares many similarities with her late mother" as well as "cheeky and hugely likeable, the mischievous teen has no fears or inhibitions and will shake up life for the Beales and the Square in general". Martin, Sonia and Rebecca returned to the show in 2014. Natalie Cassidy reprised the role of Sonia whilst Martin and Rebecca were recast to James Bye and Jasmine Armfield respectively. Rebecca is described as "a well-behaved teenager, but is also a little fighter. A bright child who is passionate about music" who "wants to do well in life and make her parents proud, but it's this determination that will be the making or undoing of her".

Ross Kemp returned to EastEnders for a brief stint as Grant Mitchell in 2016, having been a regular character from 1990 until 1999 and having already made brief comebacks in 2005 and 2006. Mark Fowler, the son of Michelle and Grant was introduced, 20 years after his off-screen birth, played by Ned Porteous. Michelle returned to the show in December 2016, with Jenna Russell taking on the role.

== Storylines ==
Beale family in 2010 from left to right: Peter, Bobby, Lucy, Jane, Ian, and Christian

Before the show began, the Beale family consisted of head of the family Albert, his wife Lou Beale, and their seven children, Harry, Ronnie, Dora, Norma, Kenny, and twins Pauline and Pete Beale. Before the show began, Albert had died and Kenny had been banished by Lou to New Zealand for having sex with Pete's wife, Pat. Albert and Lou also had a daughter named Maggie before marriage and put her up for adoption. Harry, Dora and Ronnie, who all moved away from Albert Square, gradually lost touch with their mother, and were never again heard of or seen. Harry moved to York where he became a hotel manager, he was an alcoholic who had a strained relationship with his mother which is why they lost touch. Dora married and moved away from Albert Square with her husband, it was on her wedding day that Arthur had proposed to Pauline. Ronnie was married to a woman named Gail and moved away from Albert Square because of a heart condition and later died.

At first, the family consisted of head of the family Lou Beale, Pete and Pauline. Pete and his wife, Kathy, had a teenage son, Ian. Pauline was married to Arthur Fowler and had 2 teenage children, Mark and Michelle. Their youngest son, Martin, was born in July 1985. 16-year-old daughter Michelle also fell pregnant, but nobody knew who was the father and it turned out to be Den Watts, the father of Michelle's best friend Sharon. Simon and his mother Pat Wicks arrived in Walford, who revealed that Simon was not Pete's son. Michelle's daughter Vicki was born the following year.

Michelle jilted her fiancé, Lofty, at the altar. Arthur had dipped into the Christmas club money to pay for the wedding reception and was sent to prison for 28 days, resulting in a mental breakdown, when he spent many days at a time hidden away in his shed at the allotments. Michelle later married Lofty in a quiet register office ceremony. She got pregnant by him but had an abortion and he left her.

Pete and Kathy's marriage broke down at the end of the 1980s following her rape by James Willmott-Brown. Also, Kathy's illegitimate daughter Donna Ludlow turned up to find her mother, but Kathy rejected her and she later died of a heroin overdose. Lou Beale died of angina in July 1988, and Pete broke down at her funeral. Willmott-Brown convinced Kathy to drop charges, and Pete drunkenly went after him in a stolen car, only to be stopped by the police. He was convicted of drink-driving and received a driving ban.

Ian bought Sue and Ali Osman's café on Bridge Street and became besotted with new market trader Cindy Williams. They eventually married, Ian thinking that Cindy was carrying his baby, but the baby was actually Simon's. Steven Beale was born on Boxing Day 1989, and Cindy confessed to Ian who, in a drunken frenzy, crashed his van and ended up in hospital, and Cindy and Wicksy ran away with Steven.

The Fowlers — Arthur, Michelle, Vicki, Pauline and Mark — at Michelle's graduation in 1994

Mark revealed that he was HIV positive in 1991, Ian's businesses grew, and Michelle began college and started dating Clyde Tavernier. Clyde was framed by Nick Cotton for the murder of Eddie Royle, and had to go on the run, taking Michelle, Vicki, and his son Kofi with him.

Ian set up a new restaurant, The Meal Machine, with Hattie Tavernier. In June 1992, Mark married Gill Robinson, a day before she died from AIDS-related cancer. Mark himself had announced some months earlier that he had been diagnosed as being HIV positive. Arthur's friendship with his boss, Christine Hewitt, developed into a sexual relationship, and he had an affair. Pete struck up a romance with school friend Rose Chapman, the former wife of gangster Alfie Chapman.

Michelle's close friendship with Rachel Kominski leads to rumours about her sexuality, so Michelle starts a relationship with Clyde Tavernier. Their relationship ends when Clyde catches Michelle in bed with Jack Woodman and he uses various excuses and injures himself to see and gain sympathy from Michelle. Vicki is kidnapped from school, sparking a national police hunt and she is found with a woman, Audrey Whittingham. Cindy and Ian reunite and go on to have twins, and Pete dies in a car crash with Rose, believed to have been set up by Rose's former husband's family.

Kathy starts a relationship with Phil Mitchell (Steve McFadden), opposed by Pauline until she figured out what sort of person Pete was and realised that Kathy was happy with Phil. Grant obtains a tape of a drunk Michelle and Sharon's recorded conversation about Sharon's affair with Phil, which Grant plays at Kathy and Phil's engagement party (see Sharongate). Kathy and Michelle's relationship becomes strained, but they soon make up. Michelle graduates from University with a B.A. and Kathy secretly marries Phil in early 1995. Their son, Ben, is born a year later – meaning that Kathy has finally given birth to her third child, an incredible 27 years after giving birth for the second time.

Mark meets Ruth Aitken, a Scottish nanny, and they marry. Michelle, pregnant with Grant Mitchell's baby, and Vicki moved to America. Cindy has another affair with Ian's half-brother David Wicks, who is revealed as Bianca Jackson father. Ian is forced to deal with Kathy expecting Phil's baby and she gives birth to Ben Mitchell. Arthur is imprisoned when he is falsely accused of stealing local money and is framed by Willy Roper. He suffers a mental breakdown, which leads to his eventual death. Ian is shot, but survives and is discovered Cindy hired a hitman. Mark's second marriage later collapses.

Martin starts hanging around with a gang, who cause trouble and Martin is arrested and placed under the supervision of a social worker. Bianca marries Ricky Butcher, and Cindy leaves Walford, with Barry Evans' help, but is forced to leave Lucy behind. Ian tracks Cindy and the boys down to Italy, with her new boyfriend Nick Holland. Phil and Grant Mitchell help Ian take the kids back and Cindy has to return to England and face trial for kidnap. Bianca has to abort hers and Ricky's daughter, Natasha, as she had spina bifida. They go on to have Liam and her marriage collapses after her fling with stepfather Dan Sullivan and she moves to Manchester. A pregnant Cindy awaiting trial for conspiracy to murder, but dies in childbirth. The child, Cindy Williams, is raised by Cindy's sister.

Kathy moves to South Africa following her marriage breakdown, but returns for Ian's wedding to Mel Healy (Tamzin Outhwaite) the following year and had a fling with Grant. Kathy marries Gavin Sullivan (Paul Nicholas). Lucy becomes ill and it's feared she has cancer, but is given the all-clear before Ian and Mel's wedding. Ian keeps it from Mel, thinking she would leave. Mel leaves Ian hours after marrying after finding out. 15-year-old Sonia gives birth to Chloe Jackson, Martin's daughter, but Sonia did not know she was pregnant. Sonia struggles to bond with Chloe and decides to put her up for adoption, but Pauline and Martin decide to go for custody. Chloe is adopted by Neil and Sue Miller, who change her name to Rebecca after Martin admits to Pauline that he is not ready to be a father. 18 months later, Sonia kidnaps Rebecca after she is overwhelmed with guilt over giving Rebecca up, but she hands her back after persuasion from Dot. When Neil and Sue die in a car accident, Rebecca's adoptive grandmother, Margaret Wilson, becomes her legal guardian and she later gives custody to Martin and Sonia.

In 2002, a 12-year-old Steven finds out Ian is not his biological father and goes to live with Simon in New Zealand. Ian marries Laura Dunn (Hannah Waterman in May 2001 but their marriage almost breaks within a few months following Ian's fling with 18-year-old prostitute Janine Butcher (Charlie Brooks). Their marriage finally ends on Christmas Day 2002 when Laura reveals she is pregnant and Ian denies being the father of after a vasectomy. Laura is convinced Garry Hobbs (Ricky Groves) is the father. Bobby Beale (Kevin Curran) is born and following Laura's death, Ian finds Bobby's birth certificate and discovers he is Bobby's father. Ian takes Bobby from Garry. In early 2006, news reaches Walford that Kathy and Gavin have been killed in a car accident and a 10-year-old Ben is placed in Ian's care, but Phil gains custody.

Pauline reluctantly marries Joe Macer in February 2006. When Joe could not decide between his marriage to Pauline and friendship with Bert, she threw him out. Joe responded by hitting Pauline with a frying pan and she subsequently died on Christmas Day 2006, of a brain injury caused by the blow. Joe died soon after in January 2007 but not before confessing to Pauline's murder.

Mark married Lisa Fowler in April 2002, but she left him for Phil Mitchell (the father of her daughter Louise) within months. Soon after, Mark discovered that his HIV medication was no longer working, and he left Walford in February 2003. Fourteen months later Pauline received that news that Mark had died of an AIDS-related illness.

Martin ran over Jamie Mitchell in December 2002. After Jamie died in hospital from his injuries a few days later, Martin was sentenced to four months in youth custody. A year later, 19-year-old Martin married Jamie's ex-girlfriend Sonia Jackson and Ian began a relationship with Jane Collins. Peter and Lucy were wary of Jane due to Ian’s previous relationship history but Pauline persuaded them to give Jane a chance.

Pauline marries Joe Macer in February 2006, but they separate after a few months, and Pauline dies on Christmas Day after collapsing in the Square. It is later revealed that Joe – who kills himself – had attacked her after making a brief return to Albert Square to confront her. Martin, Rebecca, and Sonia leave the Square soon after Pauline dies, and Ian and his family move into her house.

In 2007, Ian married Jane in a quiet registry office ceremony, making her his fourth wife. Later that year, a 17-year-old Steven returned to Walford and proceeded to stalk Ian, having first used the internet to contact his siblings which the pretence that he was Ian's first wife Cindy, who had died in November 1998. Ian was held hostage for several weeks whilst Steven rejoined the family, poisoning Lucy's mind against her father in the process. When Steven's deception was revealed, Ian's wife Jane was accidentally shot and needed an emergency hysterectomy. Whilst Jane was devastated that she was now unable to conceive, Ian eventually forgave Steven, but when Steven helped Lucy run away, Ian banished him for good. In 2010, Jane legally adopted Bobby.

Ian and Jane's marriage was marred with various affairs on both sides and in May 2011 Jane left Walford to avoid upsetting Bobby with her and Ian's constant fighting. By this time Lucy had already left as Ian could not control her rebellious behaviour and Peter joined her in Devon four months later. Alone with Bobby, Ian became depressed until he was reunited with Mandy Salter, his girlfriend from two decades before. The two began a relationship but a one-night stand with Ricky destroyed his marriage to Bianca as she drove him away from Walford and Ian was left unable to trust her. Despite this, Ian and Mandy decided to get married when she confided in him about her deceased daughter, who was fathered by Ricky in 1994 and she apologised for the betrayal. To impress Mandy, Ian bought the cafe back, once again adding it to his empire. This disgusted Lucy, who had returned to Walford and quickly disliked Mandy. Unfortunately, numerous pressures added strain to the relationship- trust issues, Lucy's interfering, money woes and the revelation that Ian's brother Ben had murdered Heather Trott- and Mandy, seeing that Ian was ready to give up his daughter for her, left him on their wedding day in May 2012.

From left to right: Peter, Lucy, Ian, Jane, Bobby and Cindy in 2014

Upon Mandy's departure, Ian suffered a breakdown and went missing from Albert Square for several weeks, leaving Lucy to look after Bobby and the businesses. Upon his return, Lucy forced her father to sign all of his businesses and the family home to her in case he ever disappeared again. Eventually, Ian did return to his normal state and began a relationship with Denise Fox whilst opening a new restaurant in the process. In 2013, Peter returns to Walford for the restaurant's grand opening. Bobby started a relationship with Tiffany (despite their blood relation), to their parent's displeasure. In August 2013, Cindy Williams arrived in Walford to live with the Beale family, however Peter was not pleased by her presence. It is later revealed that this is because Cindy knew that Peter's friend from Devon had died whilst swimming, and Peter suffered from survivor's guilt as a result. David returned to Walford in September that year, hoping to reunite with Carol despite her relationship with Masood Ahmed. Eventually, the former couple reconciled but Carol ended her relationship with David on their wedding day when she realised that he still had trouble with commitment, with David subsequently moving to Florida.

In 2014, Jane Beale returns to Walford and becomes a partner in Ian's new restaurant. Lucy also opens her own lettings agency, called LB Lettings, with her best friend Lauren Branning. However, Lucy is having a fling with Lauren's father, Max Branning. Cindy Williams also has sex with TJ Spraggan, in spite of having a relationship with Ian's great nephew Liam Butcher, and gets pregnant by him. Peter begins a relationship with Lola Pearce and moves in with her. Lucy calls off her relationship with Max and it is revealed that she is using cocaine on a regular basis because of problems with her father. After beginning a relationship with Lee Carter, tensions arise between her and Whitney as she is also interested in Lee. Although Whitney and Lee begin a relationship, Lucy's dead body is found on Walford Common (see Who Killed Lucy Beale?); when Ian hears the news, he is devastated.

Jane leaves Walford with Bobby to overcome their grief away from Ian. Peter moves back in with Ian when his relationship with Lola hits a rough patch. DC Emma Summerhayes becomes the Beales' family liaison officer following Lucy's death, and, at Lucy's funeral, her relationship with Max is revealed, causing Ian to lash out at him publicly. Denise nearly leaves Ian, but decides to stay and they grow closer. Phil begins to question Ian's alibi when he overhears Cindy questioning Ian as she knows his alibi is fake, and later it is revealed Ian saw prostitute Rainie Cross on the night Lucy died. Rainie begins blackmailing Ian, threatening to reveal his infidelity to Denise in order to fund her drug habit. When Ian stops paying her, she reveals what happened to Patrick Trueman, Denise's father figure. Patrick tries to tell Denise but suffers a stroke before he can.

Various suspects, including Max, Jake Stone, and Billy Mitchell, are questioned by the police, but they are all proved innocent. DI Keeble takes over the case, and encourages a press appeal, at which they ask for a man in a beanie hat to come forward as he was on the bus with Lucy on the night she died. Ian makes an impact statement, but afterwards is interrogated by press as to Lucy's drug habit. Phil realises that Keeble did not stop the interrogation as she knows Ian is hiding something, and Ian confesses the truth about Rainie to Phil. Mick Carter helps Ian through his issues, but sees Ian and Rainie together. While speaking with Rainie, he is arrested for kerb crawling, but Ian convinces him to keep quiet and plead guilty to protect his fake alibi. Rainie tells Denise the truth, and she leaves him, while Cindy returns to Walford and gives birth to a daughter, Beth. Peter proposes to Lauren Branning, who has become his girlfriend after supporting him through his grief for Lucy, after holidaying in New Zealand with Steven, but she rejects him when she discovers he was Lucy's cocaine dealer. Ian disowns Peter but later makes amends with him with the help of Jane, who returns with Bobby.

Martin's wife Sonia, who has been visiting her mother Carol Jackson to help her with her breast cancer, reestablishes herself in Walford and begins running a 'Fat Blasters' club to helping women lose weight. She feels insecure in her marriage and Martin pays little attention to her. She collapses after a dodgy gastric band implant in Bulgaria, and Martin returns to find her being rushed to hospital. Meanwhile, Bianca finally decides to leave Walford for a fresh start in Milton Keynes with Tiffany, Morgan and her boyfriend Terry Spraggan. Since then, Liam has assisted Cindy in raising Beth.

In 2015, Lucy's murder storyline reaches a climax, leaving several characters as potential culprits. During the final scene of the flashback episode which aired on 19 February 2015 to mark EastEnders thirtieth anniversary, it was revealed that Bobby had accidentally killed his sister when he threw her jewellery box at her head, upset at the constant rows she caused. Bobby's crime was discovered by Jane who immediately concealed the murder in order to protect her son. Ian discovers the truth on the day of his wedding to Jane; though grief-stricken, he does forgive his wife and son. However, Peter is unable to do so and moves to New Zealand with a pregnant Lauren. Before he leaves, he and Bobby make amends.

Also during the anniversary episode, Kathy Beale made a shock return when she met up with Phil Mitchell, despite the fact that she was believed to have died in 2006. It was shown that Phil had been providing Kathy with money, although he refused to help her any further.

Martin and Sonia's marital turmoil upsets Rebecca and she is unhappy to learn of her mother's lesbian relationship with Tina Carter, especially when Tina unveils details of their sex life in front of her. She briefly goes through a goth phase and insists on being called by her original name of Chloe, in order to help establish her identity. Martin is also unhappy at the news although he and Sonia have a one-night stand in May 2015 to Tina's disgust. This potentially ruins Ian and Jane's attempts to adopt Beth, a move which Cindy only reluctantly allowed. Cindy changes her mind about Ian and Jane adopting Beth and threatens to expose Bobby as their sister's killer if they do not let her give up Beth. Ian and Jane try to persuade Cindy not to, but in the end, they arrange for Beth to live with TJ in Milton Keynes. Ian throws Cindy out and she stays secretly with Liam until Carol finds out. Jane pays Carol to look after Cindy, not wanting to lose another daughter. When Cindy discovers this, she skips attending her school prom and gets into a car with 2 strange men and Liam alerts Ian and Jane. When Cindy is found safe, she initially refuses to live with Ian and Jane, but Liam persuades her and Ian and Cindy make up. Cindy and Liam leave for Germany.

Ian and Bobby leave Walford whilst Max's trial happens. A heavily pregnant Lauren Branning returns to support Max and gives birth to Peter's son, Louie Beale. Jane gives Max a false alibi, however Max is found guilty. Max jumps the dock and goes on the run. He visits Jane to know why she lied for him and when Jane helps Max flee England, Max works out that Bobby killed Lucy. When Ian returns with Bobby, Ian can not cope and he writes a suicide note before disappearing. Jane frantically searches for Ian and finds him on a bridge prepared to jump. Jane talks him down and he sees Kathy. Ian realises Kathy is alive and whilst he takes the news well, Ben struggles to accept what Kathy has done. Kathy's husband Gavin Sullivan (Paul Nicholas) is revealed to be Sharon's biological father.

Stacey gives birth to a son, Arthur Fowler, with Martin unaware that Kush Kazemi is the father. Two weeks later, Stacey's cousin Kat Moon (Jessie Wallace) discovers and when Stacey goes missing with Arthur shortly after, Martin and Kush grow concerned and try to find her. Martin eventually finds Stacey on the roof of the Queen Victoria. She claims that Arthur is the son of God, and says that God will rescue them from what she thinks are demons. Martin, believing it is a symptom of her unmedicated bipolar, goes along with what she says and convinces her to come home with him. On the day of Charlie's funeral, Stacey is upset that she did not get to the church so God could give her a message. She does not allow Martin near Arthur and smashes glass cups to protect them. When Stacey goes to Kush and Shabnam's for safety, Martin talks to her and persuades her that she is safe with him. He takes her to hospital and after Stacey speaks to a psychologist, Martin learns that there are no mother and baby units and Martin is also told that Stacey will have to be sectioned. Martin breaks the news to Stacey and he is later informed Stacey is suffering from postpartum psychosis. Concerned for Martin, Kathy speaks to Martin, reminiscing about his parents and with her support, Martin visits Stacey.

From left to right: Stacey, Arthur, Lily, Martin, Ian, Bex and Bobby in 2016

Bobby is enrolled at private school and Ian and Jane decide to sell Beale's in order to raise the money for his fees. The locals, especially the market traders, protest against Ian selling the restaurant when they realise he is selling to a supermarket chain. Ian later decides not to sell the restaurant and Bobby attacks Jane with his hockey stick when he overhears Jane telling Sharon that they can not afford to send Bobby to private school. Bex and Louise Mitchell both fall for Shakil Kazemi and Bex starts a relationship with Shakil. Martin and Stacey marry and at their reception, Bobby confesses that he attacked Jane and killed Lucy in front of everyone. Bobby is arrested and confesses to the police that he was responsible for killing Lucy. Jane ends her marriage to Ian and Lauren returns from New Zealand with Louie and Steven and Ian learns that Lauren and Steven are together. At Bobby's hearing, he is denied bail and Jane and Ian's relationship ends, although they soon reunite.

Martin struggles to accept Bex dating Shakil. Buster Briggs begins an affair with Kathy and her estranged husband Gavin tricks her into her house, hoping for a reconciliation. Mark Fowler, the son of Michelle and Grant arrives in Walford after Phil finds a letter from Michelle to Peggy about Mark and he contacts Mark. Phil denies speaking to Mark after agreeing to drop his paternity, but decides to stay in Walford, developing a crush on Courtney Mitchell (Alice Nokes), unaware they are related. Shakil upsets Bex when he calls her frigid when she is not ready for sex, but they make up. Bex and Shakil eventually lose their virginities to each other and Martin is furious when he finds out. Bex and Shakil soon break up.

In December 2016, Max returns to Walford and appears to forgive the Beales for the events of the previous year, to their relief although it is apparent that Max is not telling the truth. In addition, Michelle Fowler returns to Walford after 21 years away and whilst Ian, Sharon and Martin are very happy to see her, she clashes with her sister-in-law Stacey Fowler. Michelle alludes to a secret that she has been hiding and eventually admits to Sharon she had an affair with a pupil, Preston Cooper. The situation becomes more complicated when Preston arrives to continue his affair with Michelle, and ends up dating Bex. Michelle is horrified to catch them in bed together. Bex is left devastated and humiliated when Michelle's affair with Preston is publicly revealed in the Vic and Martin attacks Preston. Ian gets involved and contacts Sharon, who drives Preston away from Walford for good. Chasing after him, Michelle takes Phil's car and crashes it into Ian's chip shop. Martin refuses to speak to his sister whilst Stacey tries to keep the peace between them.

Bex begins to develop feelings for her teacher Mr. Pryce and she makes a move on him, which he reciprocates. However, he rebuffs all other advances and begins a relationship with Bex's mother Sonia. When she discovers what has happened, she attacks Mr. Pryce and he leaves for good. Shakil is horrified to learn what happened and wants to reunite with Bex, however this never happens.

Ian and Jane remain unaware that Max is plotting revenge against them and try to move on with their lives. Although shocked to discover that Lauren and Steven are an item, Ian and Jane allow them to move into the Beale house with Louie, and Lauren grows close to them both. Lauren tells Ian that she left Peter because he was going off the rails in New Zealand, involved in drugs and alcohol. Steven grows paranoid that Lauren no longer loves him and bugs her phone to keep track of her movements. Believing that Lauren is cheating on him, he bugs her phone to track her location and when Lauren insists that she does not want more children, he pokes holes in their condoms to trap her jerk falling pregnant. Steven then begins an affair with Abi Branning when he discovers that Lauren has aborted their child. He then tells her and his family that he has terminal cancer, devastating Ian at the thought of losing another child and Lauren stays with him; however, he is lying and Abi helps him with his scheme. Max discovers the truth and as an act of revenge, sets fire to the restaurant and leaves Jane and Steven inside to burn to death. Both escape the flames but Steven later succumbs to a liver bleed following a previous altercation with Max and dies in hospital. The truth of his lies are revealed and only Abi attends his funeral. Max later threatens to harm Bobby and forces Jane to flee Walford in October 2017, unintentionally abandoning her husband in the process. Ian eventually discovers the truth about Max's deceit when Max tries to persuade him to sell his businesses and then decides to strangle Ian with some tinsel. He is saved by Lauren's timely arrival. Max's ex-wife Tanya tells Ian and Stacey the truth about Max's lies and Max's involvement in Jane's departure. Ian and Max fight in the square.

Steven and Abi's daughter, Abi Branning Jr, is born in late December 2017 after her mother falls off a roof and dies. She is raised by her grandfather Max and great aunt Rainie Cross.

Martin and Stacey decide to try for a baby and Stacey falls pregnant; despite concerns for her mental health, Stacey has no problems and gives birth to a daughter whom she names Hope Fowler. However, Martin and Stacey's marriage is at risk of ending when Max sleeps with Stacey in Christmas Eve 2017. She admits the truth to Martin and they separate, before reuniting in May 2018 – on the day of their second wedding anniversary.

Kathy comes face to face with James Willmott-Brown again after 25 years and he her that he is dying. Kathy is unable to forgive him and forces him away from her. Ben and Ian both confront Willmott-Brown for raping Kathy, which he continues to deny.

In 2018, Ian comes face to face with his ex-wife Mel Owen again and attempts to woo her, although they fail. Ian decides to reopen the restaurant with Masood Ahmed but problems arise when he kisses Kathy. Ian and Masood maintain a working relationship and become frenemies.

Michelle faces problems when she agrees to tutor Hunter Owen, however he lies that she has abused him. Mel and Michelle have a furious showdown and although the truth is revealed, Michelle decides to leave Walford.

Ian leaves Walford in 2021 and reunites with his ex wife Cindy Beale in France. It is revealed that Cindy had not died in childbirth after all but had gone into witness protection after she revealed vital information about her dangerous cell mate Jackie Ford. Upon entering witness protection, Cindy had married George Knight and had two daughters with him, Gina Knight and Anna Knight and they ran a bar in Marbella. When news reached Spain of Lucy’s death, Cindy had gone back to the square which compromised the lives of her family and her witness protection. In 2023, it is revealed that Cindy and Ian are living in France with Peter and Louie. Peter and Lauren almost restart their relationship until she discovers that Cindy is alive. Once Jackie Ford’s death has been confirmed, the Beales return to the square. Cindy tries to be a part of her daughters lives and kisses her former husband George on several occasions, to his wife Elaine Peacock’s annoyance. Missing George, Cindy begins an affair with his son Junior Knight. Meanwhile, Lauren Branning, who has since reunited with Peter, is injured in a club crush and discovers that she is pregnant again. To manage her pain, Lauren takes morphine but becomes addicted and Cindy uses this to her advantage. On Christmas Day 2024, Cindy’s affair with Junior is revealed and she is assaulted in the square by an unknown person (later revealed to be Kathy Beale who despises her). Cindy also has a volatile relationship with Bobby due to his role in Lucy’s death and is unhappy that he is in a relationship with Anna. Cindy also meets Jane and the pair argue until Cindy discovers that Steven is responsible for Jane’s infertility. Eventually, Bobby and Anna’s relationship ends and he moves to the Cotswolds with Jane.

In 2024, Martin reunites with Ruby Allen and discovers that he is the father of her son, Roman Allen. To help set his future up for his family, Ian sells the fruit stall to Martin who has worked on it for the last decade.

In February 2025, Martin is killed after suffering from crush syndrome after being struck by a falling structural beam following the explosion in the Queen Vic which Cindy was indirectly responsible for. Upon finding out Kathy was behind her attack on Christmas Day, Cindy threatened to report her to the authorities and pushed Ian in front of a speeding car which swerved and crashed into the Vic. Martin’s former wife Stacey had declared her love for him earlier in the day and he died by her side, leaving her distraught. Vicki Fowler returned to Walford a month later for his funeral and decided to stay. Bex also returns for the funeral before leaving for Bali, with her mother Sonia Fowler, aunt Bianca Jackson and Sonia’s newborn daughter Julia Fowler joining her. Peter also took over the fruit and veg stall. In May, Lauren gave birth to her and Peter’s second son Jimmy Beale but it was discovered that he was blind. Lauren initially blamed herself for her drug abuse but it is revealed that it is due to genetics. Lauren and Peter marry in September 2025.

== The Beale Empire ==
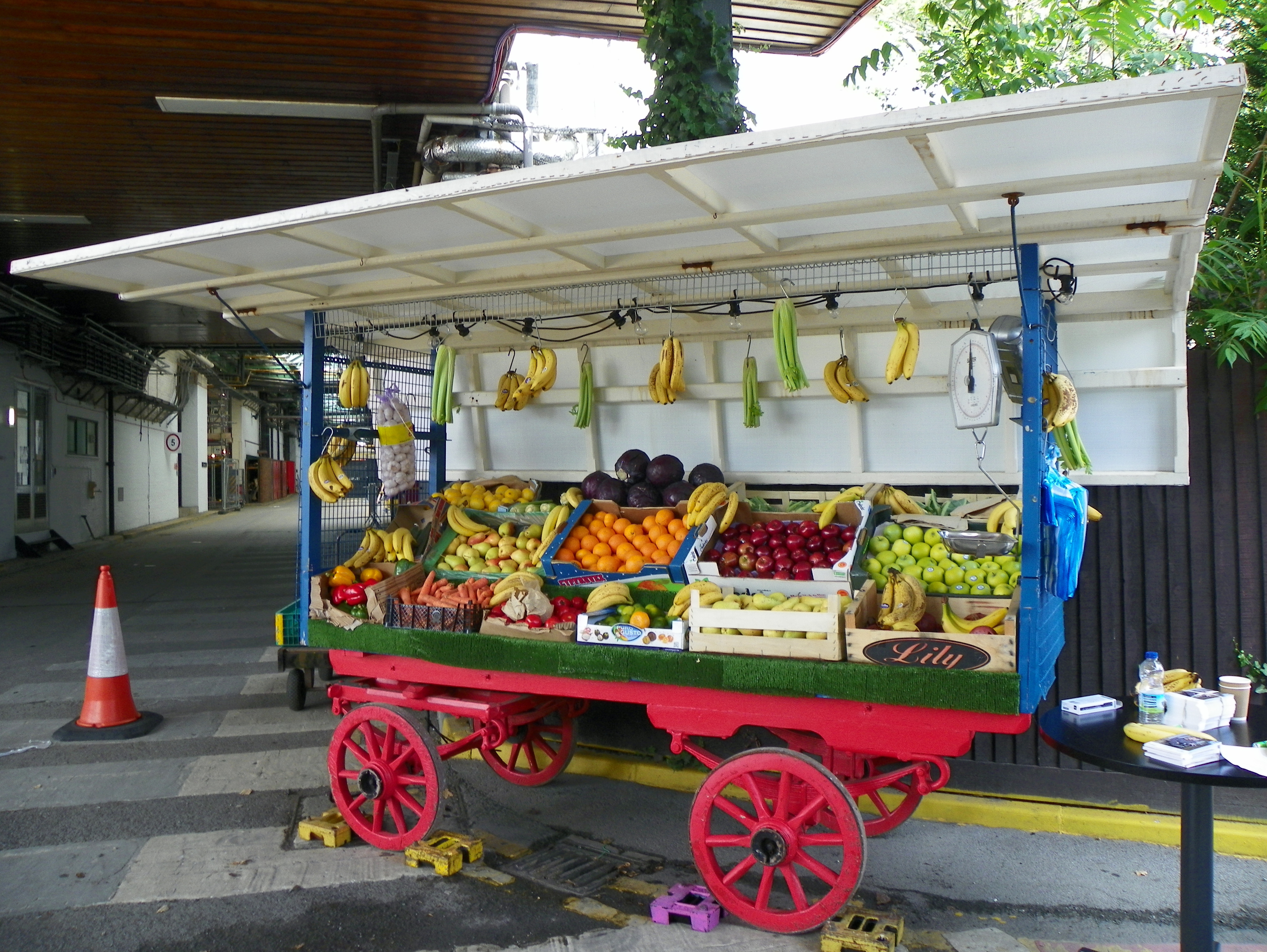
The Beales' fruit and veg stall from Bridge Street Market

Since 1939, the Beales own the market stall in Walford. Local miser Ian Beale, is the owner of Meal Machine before the business dissolves and the Arches garage for a while before Phil Mitchell buys it again. Ian owns several other businesses: the market stall, Bridge Street Café ("Kathy's", 1990–2011, 2016– "Mandy's", 2012, "Cindy's" 2012–2016), Fit For a Queen (part of Masala Queen, 2008–2011), Beale's Plaice (since 1995, briefly named Peter's Place in 1997) and Beale's Restaurant (2014–2017; previously Ian Beale@Le Square, 2013, and Scarlett's, 2013–2014). In 2012, Ian signs all his businesses and properties, including 45 Albert Square, to his daughter Lucy Beale, who is also a landlord of many flats in George Street. They are eventually returned to Ian.

Ian also owns The Queen Victoria in 2009 as part of a loan contract, which he sells to Archie Mitchell. Chrissie Watts also sells it illegally to him in 2005. As she has forged her husband's signature, it is returned to the Watts. In 2020, Ian once again buys the Vic for Sharon Watts. David Wicks, Ian's half-brother, owns the car lot when he lives in Albert Square whilst Lucy Beale co-owned property letting agency LB Lettings alongside her best friend Lauren Branning until her death in 2014.

Year	Title	Owner(s)
1939–present	Fruit and vegetable market stall	Pete Beale (until 1993); Ian Beale (1993, 2007–2013); David Wicks (1993); Mark Fowler (1993–2002); Martin Fowler (2002–2007, 2015–2025); Peter Beale (2013–2015, 2025–present)
2020–2021	The Queen Victoria	Ian Beale (2020–2021)
1989–2011, 2012–2017, 2017–2023, 2024–present	Kathy's Café	Ian Beale (1989–1991, 1995–2000, 2004–2011, 2012, 2013–2017); Kathy Beale (1989–1995, 2017–2023. 2024–present); Laura Beale (2004); Jane Beale (2004–2011); Lucy Beale (2012–2013)
1995–2000, 2002–2017, 2018–present	Beale's Plaice (fish and chip shop)	Ian Beale (1995–2000, 2002–2012, 2013–2017, 2018–present); Lucy Beale (2012–2013)
2008–2011	Masala Queen (Indian food service)	Ian Beale (2008–2011); Jane Beale (2008–2011)
2013–2022	Walford East (restaurant)	Ian Beale (2013–2022); Jane Beale (2014–2017)
2014	Deals On Wheels (car lot)	David Wicks (1993–1996, 2014)
2014	LB Lettings (lettings agency)	Lucy Beale (2014)
2019–present	The Prince Albert (gay bar)	Kathy Beale (2019–2025); Cindy Beale (2025–present)
2023–present	Beale’s Eels (Pie & Mash shop)	Ian Beale (2023–present); Cindy Beale (2023–present)

== Family members ==
- Unknown
  - Dolly Beale (deceased)
  - Unknown (Note: His first name was not revealed but, in CivvyStreet, his middle name was revealed to be Kenneth.) Kenneth Beale (deceased)
    - Albert Beale (deceased), married to Lou Beale (deceased)
      - Maggie Flaherty (deceased), married to Sean Flaherty
        - Eamonn Flaherty, married to Brenda Flaherty
          - Colette Flaherty
          - Eamonn Flaherty Jnr
          - Declan Flaherty
          - Kylie Flaherty
          - Carl Flaherty
        - Conor Flaherty, son of Maggie and Sean Flaherty, married to Geraldine Flaherty
          - Mary Flaherty, daughter of Conor and Geraldine
          - Unnamed child of Conor and Ruth Fowler
        - Tommy Flaherty
        - John Flaherty
      - Harry Beale
      - Ronnie Beale (deceased), married to Gail
      - Dora Beale
      - Norma Beale
      - Kenny Beale, married to Barbara
        - Elizabeth Beale
      - Pauline Beale (deceased) married to Arthur Fowler (deceased) and Joe Macer (deceased)
        - Mark Fowler (deceased), married to Gill Robinson (deceased), Ruth Aitken and Lisa Shaw
        - Michelle Fowler, married to George Holloway and Tim Andrews
          - Vicki Fowler, daughter of Michelle and Den Watts (deceased)
          - Mark Fowler, son of Michelle and Grant Mitchell
        - Martin Fowler (deceased), twice married to Sonia Jackson, married to Stacey Slater and Ruby Allen
          - Bex Fowler, daughter of Martin and Sonia
          - Hope Fowler, daughter of Martin and Stacey
          - Roman Allen, son of Martin and Ruby
      - Pete Beale (deceased), married to Pat Harris (deceased) and Kathy Hills
        - David Wicks, son of Pete and Pat, married to Lorraine Foster
          - Bianca Jackson, daughter of David and Carol Jackson, twice married to Ricky Butcher
            - Liam Butcher, son of Bianca and Ricky
            - Tiffany Butcher, daughter of Bianca and Ricky, married to Keegan Baker
            - Morgan Butcher, son of Bianca and Ray Dixon
          - Joe Wicks, son of David and Lorraine
            - Holly Wicks, daughter of Joe
          - Karen Wicks (deceased), daughter of David and Lorraine
        - Ian Beale, son of Pete and Kathy, married to Cindy Williams, Mel Healy (deceased), Laura Dunn (deceased), Jane Collins and Sharon Watts
          - Peter Beale, son of Ian and Cindy, married to Lauren Branning
            - Louie Beale, son of Peter and Lauren
            - Jimmy Beale, son of Peter and Lauren
          - Lucy Beale (deceased), daughter of Ian and Cindy
          - Bobby Beale, son of Ian and Laura, adopted by Jane

In addition to the Beales, Lou's cousin Nellie Ellis resided with the Fowlers for a period of time in the 1990s. Similarly, Arthur Fowler's aunt Betty from Leigh-on-Sea was frequently mentioned, before appearing for Arthur's funeral in 1996. In 2025, Arthur's father was named as Christopher Fowler.

Also mentioned in July 1985 were two cousins from Basildon, Gary and Janine, who were also forgotten in favour of other relatives. Albert Beale's aunt, Dolly Beale, was also mentioned in the EastEnders novels.

See Lou Beale#Continuity regarding children for further information.

== Reception ==
The Beale family was longlisted for "Best Family" at the 2014 Inside Soap Awards.

== See also ==
- Who Killed Lucy Beale?
- EastEnders episodes in Ireland
