= Ruth Fowler =

Fictional character from the BBC soap opera EastEnders

- EastEnders character
- Portrayed by: Caroline Paterson
- Duration: 1994–1999
- First appearance: Episode 1006; 28 July 1994
- Last appearance: Episode 1736; 11 February 1999
- Introduced by: Barbara Emile
In-universe information
- Occupation: Nursery assistant Foster carer
- Family: Fowler
- Father: Hugh Aitken
- Mother: Maureen Aitken
- Brothers: John Aitken
- Sisters: Susan Aitken
- Husband: Mark Fowler (1995–1999)
- Adoptive daughters: Jessie Moore (foster)

Ruth Fowler (also Aitken) is a fictional character from the BBC soap opera EastEnders, played by Caroline Paterson from 1994 to 1999. Ruth was Mark Fowler (Todd Carty)'s ex-wife and she is far more comfortable with his HIV status than many of his other girlfriends. However, their marriage eventually disintegrates due to Mark's habit of shutting her out and his inability to give Ruth a child. They split and she strays with Mark's cousin, Conor Flaherty (Seán Gleeson). Her betrayal deeply hurts Mark but it also gives her the chance to be a mother as she becomes pregnant with Conor's child.

== Creation and development ==
Ruth was introduced in 1994 by Series Producer Barbara Emile as a former love-interest for Mark Fowler (Todd Carty), who was HIV positive in the serial. Her storyline focused upon the marriage of the couple, and in particular the difficulties that they faced due to Mark's HIV status (Ruth was HIV negative).

In 1998, executive producer Matthew Robinson axed a large number of characters from EastEnders, among them Ruth Fowler. An EastEnders spokeswoman said, "In any long-running drama there are going to be changes from time to time. We have some powerful storylines coming up this autumn, and some characters will not have a role in them."

Ruth's exit storyline surrounded the break-up of her marriage to Mark Fowler (Todd Carty). In the storyline, Ruth had an affair with Mark's cousin Conor Flaherty (Sean Gleeson), which left her pregnant. The character departed in February 1999 to be a single mother, with Paterson saying she was relieved to be leaving. At the time she commented, "I was doing EastEnders and being a mother. It felt like I wasn't fully there for either, which was awful." Paterson has since claimed it was her decision to quit the soap and that producers wanted her to sign another two-year contract when her son was born in 1998 but she declined and would only sign one. In 1999 she added, "EastEnders wasn't just about acting in a soap opera. You had to deal with the media and your social life was non-existent because you were so busy. I left because of my son. He made me realise the type of life I was leading. I felt guilty about leaving Louis after three months to go back to work."

== Storylines ==
Ruth, who is from Edinburgh, Scotland, comes from a strict Presbyterian family headed by a minister father. She comes to London with her friend Anna, because she does not want to comply with her father's ideals. Anna contracts HIV, and Ruth is first seen in July 1994, visiting her at a hospice. There, she meets Mark Fowler (Todd Carty), who has HIV. She and Mark bond, and he comforts her when Anna dies. Ruth comes to Walford to visit Mark and soon moves in with him and his sister Michelle Fowler (Susan Tully). Ruth and Mark start a relationship and she gets a job at the local community centre as a nursery assistant. In 1995, they get engaged, and Ruth's father, Hugh Aitken (Donald Douglas) insists that they marry in Scotland but her family are not welcoming when they discover Mark's HIV status. They respond with trepidation and ignorance, refusing to distinguish between AIDS and HIV, despite Mark's best efforts to explain. Believing he is contagious, they do not let him stay in their home, suggesting that he represents everything they have spent their lives battling. Ultimately, Ruth and Mark marry without her parents' blessing.

They soon start to argue because Ruth although she tells Mark she is happy about not having children, this is not true. They visit a counsellor who tells them their options, and they decide to be foster parents. They are given their first foster child, 6-year-old Jessie Moore (Chelsey Paden), whose mother is in prison on remand. Jessie refuses to speak and wets the bed. Mark and Ruth try to get her to engage with them and they eventually make progress. Ruth returns to Scotland to visit her father, who has had a stroke. While she is away, Jessie receives a letter from her mother, saying she will be released from prison. When Ruth returns after her father's death, she is furious that Jessie has visited her mother in prison and will probably be returning to her mother soon. Ruth and Mark argue and Ruth grows closer to Mark's cousin, Conor Flaherty (Seán Gleeson), who is staying with them. Jessie's mother, Nicole (Sara Stephens), visits and tells them she is taking steps to get Jessie back. When Mark and Ruth try contesting Nicole's decision, they are told that fostering is about reuniting children with their parents. Both become depressed and Mark's jealousy over Ruth's relationship with Conor makes things worse. When Jessie returns to Nicole, Mark and Ruth's relationship declines swiftly. Amidst constant arguing and jealousy, Mark moves out. Ruth gets drunk and tries to seduce Conor but he turns her down, admitting to finding her attractive but he says he cannot have sex with someone whose previous partner is HIV positive and berates her for being irresponsible. Ruth is deeply offended, and when Mark finds out what has happened, he declares that their marriage is over.

Ruth spends much time partying, clubbing, and enjoying her freedom. Her wild behaviour attracts barman Huw Edwards (Richard Elis), but she rebuffs his advances. Eventually, Ruth's partying and neglect of her property means she cannot pay her bills. Mark's mother, Pauline Fowler (Wendy Richard), gives her money hoping that she and Mark will reconcile but it becomes clear that this will not happen. Ruth begins an affair with Conor, but after they have sex, he worries that Ruth will get pregnant and insists she take the morning-after pill. Ruth protests and eventually lies that she has taken it. The affair ends but she is pregnant. When Conor's daughter Mary Flaherty (Melanie Clark Pullen) accidentally tells Mark this, he is furious and beats Conor up and informs him of the pregnancy. Conor suggests he and Ruth resume their relationship and bring up the child together but she refuses, choosing to be a single parent and returns to Scotland, rejecting Mark and Conor as she leaves. Soon after, Conor and Mary leave Walford, looking for Ruth. Ruth later sends Mark a good-luck card for his wedding to Lisa Shaw (Lucy Benjamin).

== Reception ==
In 1998, EastEnders featured a storyline where several of its characters visited France as part of a World Cup storyline. In the storyline, the character Pat Evans (Pam St Clement) was dressed in clothing with "Scotland" printed on it, to signify her support of the Scottish football team's participation in the tournament. An EastEnders spokeswoman said, "Pam is not Scottish but thinks she is descended from the Scots. She asked to wear the Scotland top and will be supporting Scotland." However, the use of Pat, a cockney character, as the Scottish supporter in this storyline instead of Ruth, whose actress is Scottish, provoked criticism from the media and the Tartan Army (a name given to fans of the Scotland national football team).

Rick Fulton of the Daily Record was critical of the character. He stated, "Unfortunately, because she's a Scottish actress in a prime-time soap, no one likes or cares about Ruth. She's a moaning pinched-faced bore whose voice can grate the neighbour's cheese. [...] She is the one character in British soap who is annoying for all the wrong reasons. She is no Mrs Mangel [from Neighbours] or Mrs Mack [from Take the High Road], characters we love to hate. We just hate Ruth." He suggested that Ruth had very few "strong" storylines. He called for the character to be killed off so that she would not return again and stated that like viewers, Ruth's husband Mark "deserves a break, a nicer woman who doesn't make us Scots sound like moaning minnies."

Actress Caroline Paterson was also critical of her character upon leaving, denouncing her as dreary and saying "Good riddance, Ruth."
