= Conor Flaherty =

Fictional character from the BBC soap opera EastEnders

- EastEnders character
- Portrayed by: Seán Gleeson
- Duration: 1997–1999
- First appearance: Episode 1507; 22 September 1997
- Last appearance: Episode 1741; 22 February 1999
In-universe information
- Occupation: Car mechanic
- Family: Beale
- Father: Sean Flaherty
- Mother: Maggie Flaherty
- Brothers: Eamonn Flaherty; John Flaherty; Tommy Flaherty
- Wife: Geraldine Flaherty (backstory)
- Daughters: Mary Flaherty
- Grandfathers: Albert Beale
- Grandmothers: Lou Beale
- Uncles: Pete Beale
- Aunts: Pauline Fowler
- Nephews: Eamonn Flaherty Jr.; Declan Flaherty; Carl Flaherty
- Nieces: Colette Flaherty; Kylie Flaherty
- First cousins: David Wicks; Simon Wicks (step); Ian Beale; Mark Fowler; Michelle Fowler; Martin Fowler

Conor Flaherty is a fictional character from the BBC soap opera EastEnders, portrayed by Seán Gleeson. The character debuted in a special week of episodes set in Ireland that were directed by Philip Casson and written by Tony McHale. These episodes aired from 22–25 September 1997 and were badly received by audiences and critics, due to their stereotypical depictions of Irish people and scenes featuring donkeys roaming the streets of Ireland. He last appeared on the soap on 22 February 1999.

== Creation and development ==
In 1997, EastEnders producers announced that they were to extend the Beale/Fowler family in an "amazing" storyline that would see one of the soap's original characters, Pauline Fowler (Wendy Richard), discover that her mother, Lou Beale (Anna Wing) gave birth to an illegitimate child, back in 1933. It was also said that she was to travel to Ireland with other members of her family to meet her secret sister, Maggie Flaherty (Olivia Shanley), in "sensational episodes". When there, the Beale/Fowler family are introduced to Maggie's son, Conor, and him and his daughter, Mary Flaherty (Melanie Clark Pullen), return home with them, though it was only originally announced that Mary would be permanent, and not Conor, as they wanted to keep details "tight-lipped". On his casting, Gleeson said that "the EastEnders cast are all really nice people."

Irish actor, Colm Ó Maonlaí, had auditioned for the part of Conor but lost out to Gleeson. Maonlaí was later cast as Tom Banks, in 2002, as the old school friend of Conor's cousin, Mark Fowler (Todd Carty). He said on that casting that the casting director remembered him from his previous audition.

== Storylines ==
Conor first appears in 1997 when Pauline Fowler (Wendy Richard) tracks down Connor's mother, Maggie Flaherty (Olivia Shanley), who was revealed to be her long-lost sister. Conor also has a daughter, Mary Flaherty (Melanie Clark Pullen), the two of them moving to Walford with Pauline. Conor soon starts working as a mechanic for Phil Mitchell (Steve McFadden) and as a loan shark for Annie Palmer (Nadia Sawalha).

In 1998, Conor begins a close friendship with Mark's wife, Ruth Fowler (Caroline Paterson), which causes strain in her marriage when they begin to fall for each other. They later begin an affair and Conor is worried when they have unprotected sex. Ruth finds out that she is pregnant, but tells Conor that she took the morning-after pill. When Mark discovers this, he beats Conor up. Conor and Mary later leave Walford for a new life in Scotland, hoping to find Ruth, who had also recently departed.

== Reception ==
Just ahead of Conor and Mary's exit, Merle Brown from Scottish newspaper, the Daily Record, commented that Conor and Mary were "two of the most irritating characters" in the soap, and she was not happy that they were moving to Scotland. In 2001, Worcester News described Conor as the "lovable Irish rogue".
