= Mark Fowler =

Fictional character from the BBC soap opera EastEnders

- EastEnders character
- Todd Carty as Mark Fowler (2003)
- Portrayed by: David Scarboro (1985–1987); Todd Carty (1990–2003)
- Duration: 1985–1987, 1990–2003
- First appearance: Episode 1 "Poor Old Reg"; 19 February 1985
- Last appearance: Episode 2466; 14 February 2003
- Created by: Tony Holland and Julia Smith
- Introduced by: Julia Smith (1985); Michael Ferguson (1990)
- Spin-off appearances: Pudding Lane (1999)
- David Scarboro as Mark Fowler (1985)
In-universe information
- Occupation: Market trader Foster carer
- Family: Fowler/Beale
- Father: Arthur Fowler
- Mother: Pauline Fowler
- Brothers: Martin Fowler
- Sisters: Michelle Fowler
- Wife: Gill Robinson (1992); Ruth Aitken (1995–1999); Lisa Shaw (2002–2004)
- Adoptive daughters: Jessie Moore (foster)
- Stepdaughters: Louise Mitchell
- Grandfathers: Albert Beale
- Grandmothers: Lou Beale
- Uncles: Pete Beale
- Aunts: Maggie Flaherty
- Nephews: Mark Fowler; Roman Allen
- Nieces: Vicki Fowler; Bex Fowler; Hope Fowler
- First cousins: Conor Flaherty; Eamonn Flaherty; John Flaherty; Elizabeth Beale; David Wicks; Ian Beale
- Other relatives: Nellie Ellis; Betty; Peter Beale; Lucy Beale; Bobby Beale

Mark Fowler is a fictional character in the BBC soap opera EastEnders. Mark, an original regular character when the series started in February 1985, became a semi-regular after his original actor David Scarboro was written out of the role in April 1985. Scarboro made brief returns to the role in 1986 and 1987. Scarboro died in April 1988 and subsequently Mark was recast two years later on his return, with former Grange Hill regular Todd Carty taking on the role. From this point the character was a permanent fixture in the series and Carty remained in the role until the character was written out of the series in early 2003.

The character was originated as a member of the established Beale/Fowler family; he is the elder son of Arthur (Bill Treacher) and Pauline Fowler (Wendy Richard), and thus the older brother of Michelle (Susan Tully/Jenna Russell) and Martin (Jon Peyton-Price/James Alexandrou/James Bye). Initially a delinquent teenager from his early stint on the show, Mark was a changed man upon returning to Albert Square as a 22-year-old in 1990. Following his return, Mark became one of the programme's central characters and went on to feature in some of EastEnders' most significant and high-profile storylines. One such storyline saw Mark announce that he had received a diagnosis of HIV, which forced him to grow up fast and accept his responsibilities. He frequently found it difficult to accept the restrictions of the illness, which ultimately led to his death in April 2004.

Mark married thrice, to Gill Fowler (Susanna Dawson), who had also contracted HIV and died on the day after their wedding; Ruth Fowler (Caroline Paterson), which ended in adultery; and Lisa Shaw (Lucy Benjamin). His other prominent storylines involved feuds with his archnemesis Nick Cotton (John Altman) and love rival Phil Mitchell (Steve McFadden), an unlikely friendship with Phil's aggressive brother Grant (Ross Kemp), a much-friendlier relationship with Nick's beloved mother Dot (June Brown), a close companionship with Michelle's best friend Sharon Watts (Letitia Dean), helping his family keep secret that Sharon's adopted father Den (Leslie Grantham) is the father of Michelle's baby Vicki (Emma Herry/Samantha Leigh Martin/Scarlett Alice Johnson), becoming a suspect in the Who Shot Phil? enquiries, coping with the death of his father Arthur, and managing to reconcile with his mother Pauline in light of overcoming a number of major family problems.

== Creation and development ==
=== Introduction (1985) ===
Mark Fowler was one of the original 23 characters invented by the creators of EastEnders, Tony Holland and Julia Smith. Mark was a member of the first family of EastEnders, the Beales and Fowlers, and Holland took the inspiration for some of the series' earliest characters from his own London family and background. Mark's original character outline as written by Smith and Holland appeared in an abridged form in their book, EastEnders: The Inside Story.

Mark will be leaving school at Easter and is fairly certain to be joining his dad in the dole queue. Mark is a very tough little lad, and at a very dodgy stage in his development...There's a kind of amoral streak in his nature...The area does have a brutalising effect on a lot of its youngsters (page 55)

Several young actors were seen and read for the part of Mark (including Gary Hailes, who would later play the gay barrow boy, Barry Clark). On paper, David Scarboro was the least likely to get the job as he was relatively inexperienced, having previously appeared in only a little-known made-for-television film and Grange Hill. His reading was not a huge success, as he mumbled most of his lines. However, Holland and Smith were taken with his appearance, particularly his "piercing eyes", which reminded them of James Dean. They felt that he would be "dynamite on-screen", and his likeness to their vision of the character was uncanny, so they offered him the role.

Mark was originally scripted to be a wayward delinquent and was due to feature heavily within the first year of the series. However, as soon as the regular gruelling schedule of EastEnders production established itself, it became clear that Scarboro was not happy in the role. The stress of the heavy workload and the sudden fame that came to all the actors became difficult for him to cope with. He became unhappy with the schedule and his scripts and refused to play Mark as a racist as was intended. Holland and Smith decided to write the character out of the show to allow the actor to come to terms with the situation better. On-screen, Mark was being implicated in the murder of Reg Cox (Johnnie Clayton) and was being tempted into heroin by Nick Cotton (John Altman).

=== Initial departure and brief returns ===
Fearing Nick Cotton and the police, Mark ran away from home in April 1985. As this had not been the original plan for the character, it meant a hectic period of re-writing early in 1985. The first 50+ scripts were reworked to accommodate this major change. Many of the stories intended for Mark were subsequently given to Kelvin Carpenter (Paul J. Medford), Ian Beale (Adam Woodyatt) and Mark's sister Michelle (Susan Tully) – which partially explains why her character became so prominent in the first year. It still left a gap, though, because several of Mark's functions in the serial, as slightly the eldest of the youngsters, could not have been taken over by the others. A new character needed to be introduced to restore the balance to its original shape, which is why the character of Simon Wicks (Nick Berry) was introduced later in 1985. This meant introducing the audience to a character and a story approximately a year before it had been originally intended – "Wicksy" had originally been scheduled to join the series around the same time as his mother, Pat, who arrived in June 1986. Scarboro returned to the show briefly in December 1985 in a storyline that saw Mark's parents, Pauline (Wendy Richard) and Arthur (Bill Treacher), search for him in Southend. The storyline's intention was to help highlight the problems some parents face when their teenage children disappear from home. He returned again for brief stints in 1986 and 1987. His final appearance as Mark was on Christmas Day 1987.

=== Return and recast (1990) ===
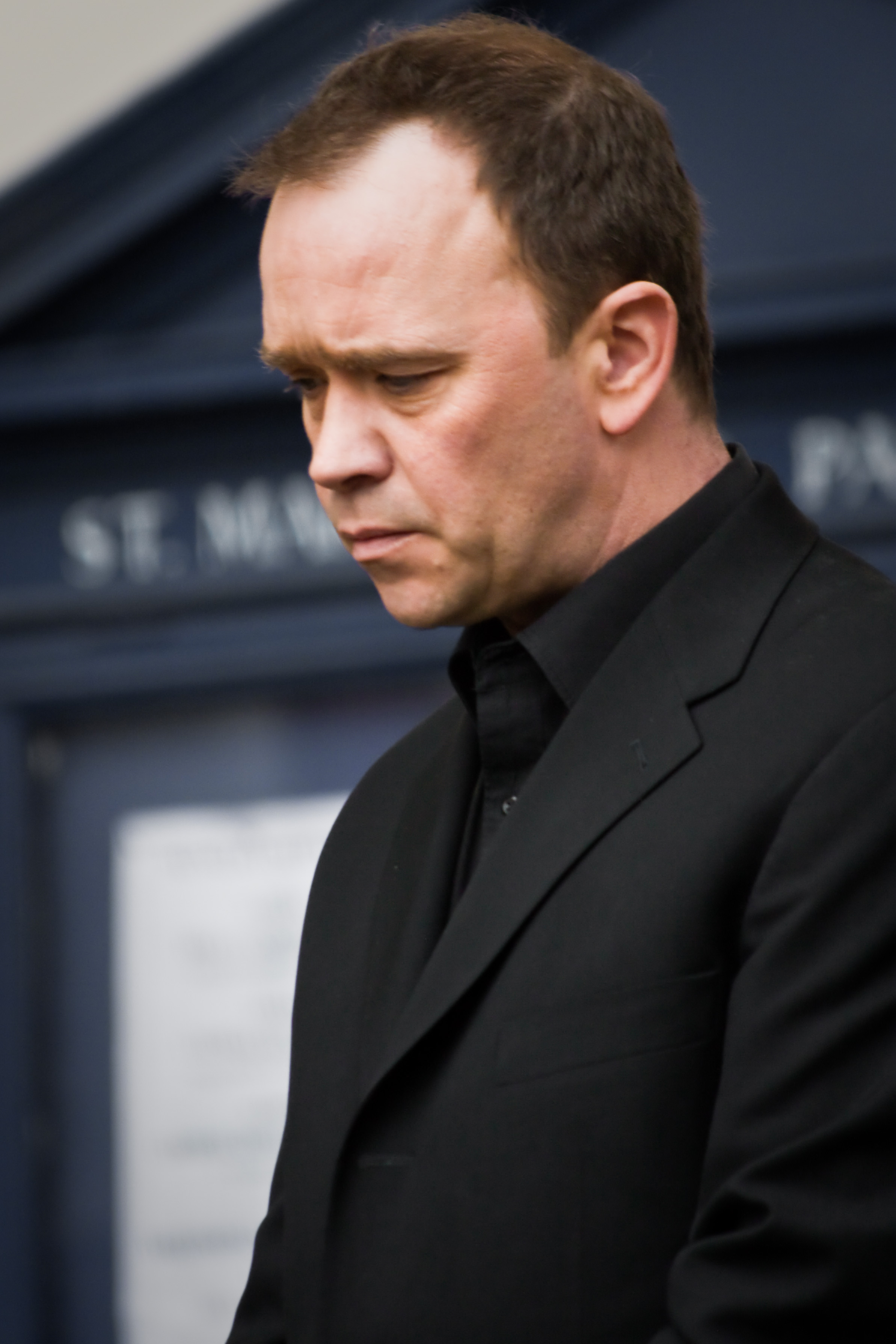
Todd Carty (pictured) was the second actor to play Mark.

Scarboro was never to make a return due to his suicide in April 1988. However, BBC bosses decided not to kill off the character, and later set out to find a new actor to reprise the role. Subsequently, the role was recast in 1990 to actor Todd Carty, renowned for his role as Tucker Jenkins in Grange Hill. At this time, Mark returned to the series as a permanent character. Carty later reported that he enjoyed playing Mark because it gave him "good dramatic stuff to get his teeth into." The most notable storyline involving Mark after his return to Albert Square was the revelation that he had contracted HIV. Mark discovered he was HIV positive in 1991, and informed his family of this on Boxing Day that year. There then followed a traumatic journey as he struggled first to come to terms with the news, then track down his previous partners to inform them that he was infected with the virus. The problems didn't end there, however, as Mark then had to battle with the fear and ignorance of those living around him – including his parents. Many of Albert Square's residents initially rejected him when they found out that he was HIV positive. Mark married one of his ex-partners Gill (Susanna Dawson), who had also been infected with the virus but in her case it had progressed to AIDS, and she subsequently died the day after the wedding in 1992.

The episode in which Gill died (written by Debbie Cook and directed by Leonard Lewis) has been chosen by writer Colin Brake as one of the most memorable episodes of 1992. In his book, EastEnders: The First Ten Years, Blake comments, "Although in many ways the episode was sad and downbeat it was not without its positive aspects, as Mark talked to his sister about his own mortality." Susanna Dawson, the actress who played Gill, found the experience of playing a person living with, and dying from, AIDS so intense that she co-produced an educational video based on the subject for use in schools and wrote a book, The Gill and Mark Story, to accompany it.

=== HIV/AIDS ===
Mark became the first mainstream soap character to receive a diagnosis of HIV-positive. The storyline came after a government request to "spread the word". Mark lived with the condition for 13 years before dying of an AIDS-related illness. The Terrence Higgins Trust worked with the production team for the duration of Mark's story. Despite all the public health campaigns concerning HIV transmission, the biggest peak in requests for testing in Britain was seen in January 1991 when Mark Fowler was diagnosed HIV-positive. Carty has commented: "I feel that the storyline educated people at a time when there were lots of misconceptions about HIV and AIDS…My main concern was that they'd get it right and, overall, I think they did – because it showed someone living with HIV, as opposed to dying of it."

The storyline was widely applauded for the way it handled the plot and the following issues that the scriptwriters explored, from anti-retroviral drugs, safe sex and prejudice. The storyline was so successful in raising awareness that a 1999 survey by the National AIDS Trust found teenagers garnered most of their information about HIV from the soap.

The character of Mark remained in the show for 13 years after his re-introduction, and featured in an array of storylines including two failed marriages, which were scripted to highlight the difficulties that can occur in a relationship when one partner has HIV and the other does not. Ultimately, Mark overcame the stigma and he enjoyed several years of happy, healthy living before finally succumbing to an AIDS-related illness and dying in April 2004 off-screen. EastEnders executive producer Louise Berridge said Carty had made a "fantastic contribution" to the soap and Mark has been a "pivotal figure" on Albert Square, but the character had finally run its course.

Campaigners have since suggested that Mark's HIV storyline could have been handled better in the latter years. Lisa Power, head of policy at the Terrence Higgins Trust, said "in some ways the storyline was not reflective of what was happening at the time as the condition was more common among the gay community". She also said "he was perhaps killed off too early as advancements in drugs are helping people live for much longer... Saying that, one decent soap episode is worth a thousand leaflets in schools. That is why we would always go out of our way to help scriptwriters. TV and films can be very powerful."

=== Departure (2003) ===
On 1 July 2002, it was announced that Mark Fowler had been axed from EastEnders and that the character was set to depart in early 2003. Carty said, "I've had 12 brilliant years on EastEnders, and they've been fantastic to me [...] I'll deeply miss all the cast and crew and everyone involved on the show." EastEnders executive producer Louise Berridge said that Carty had made a "fantastic contribution" to the soap and Mark had been a "pivotal figure" on Albert Square, but the character had finally run its course. She went on to say "Todd and I have discussed this at some length and agreed that it was time for Mark to hang up his leather jacket for the last time [...] We will all miss Todd, who is one of our best-loved actors, and wish him every success in the future." BBC's head of drama John Yorke said, "We want to thank Todd for his great contribution to EastEnders over the last 12 years." Some reports disclosed that Carty was "upset and angry" by the decision to axe Mark. According to Carty, the decision was "a bolt from the blue" from the producers.

On 16 December 2002, it was reported that Mark was to be killed-off. It was also announced that the character's death would be shown off-screen. A spokesperson for the show said, "There is now nothing more he can do medically to stop the advancement of the infection [...] Rather than see his family suffer from the deterioration of his health and eventual death, Mark decides to leave Walford to spend his remaining days seeing the world and coming to terms with his fate." Carty said: "Portraying someone with HIV has been very challenging at times but to learn Mark has been inspirational to real-life people with HIV is really humbling." Reflecting on his time in the soap, Carty went on to say "I've had great fun, made some lovely friends and have been very lucky working with terrific scripts and storylines." Mark's off-screen death aired in April 2004.

== Storylines ==
=== 1985–1987 ===
Mark Fowler is the first of three children born to Albert Square residents Arthur Fowler (Bill Treacher) and his wife Pauline (Wendy Richard); he has a sister called Michelle (Susan Tully) and the two later have a brother named Martin (Jon Peyton-Price). In the events of his teenage years, Mark got involved in drugs with local thug Nick Cotton (John Altman) before later seeking to join a racist organization known as "The New Movement". He also generally clashed with his parents before later becoming a suspect in the murder of elderly neighbour Reg Cox (Johnnie Clayton), unknowingly committed by Nick. With no solution to his own problems in sight, Mark abruptly leaves home without telling anyone. He is not seen again until eight months later when he contacts his parents through a runaways' agency; Pauline and Arthur eventually locate him in Southend-on-Sea. Mark is living with an older Swedish woman named Ingrid (Sally Faulkner) and her two children, John (Anthony Short) and Melanie (Vanessa Short) – who call Mark "Daddy". He and Ingrid split up soon afterwards and Mark moves around the country.

Mark returns to Walford several times for brief visits. In July, he brings his Welsh friend Owen Hughes (Philip Brock) over to the square. They soon cause problems after fellow neighbour Cassie Carpenter (Delanie Forbes) steals their cannabis and her parents, Tony Carpenter (Oscar James) and Hannah Carpenter (Sally Sagoe), catch her smoking it; the Carpenters refuse to speak to the Fowlers for some time afterwards. In November, Pauline receives news that Mark is in Borstal detention centre for drug offences as well as burglary and assaulting a policeman. Visiting him, Pauline finds him unrepentant but due for release in a few weeks. After his release, he briefly comes back to Walford; but eventually he wants to leave despite Pauline's pleas. Mark is not seen again until Christmas the same year, when he visits unexpectedly to spend the day with his family. Mark astutely guesses that local publican and Pauline's sworn enemy Den Watts (Leslie Grantham) is the father of Michelle's baby daughter, Vicki (Emma Herry), but nevertheless agrees at his family's bequest to keep the secret to himself. He then departs again and this would be the last time Mark is seen for over two years.

=== 1990–2003 ===
Mark returns to Albert Square in August 1990 as a changed man. He is more caring and stable, having grown out of his rebellious stage. His new maturity is due to the fact that he has contracted HIV, which has forced him to become more responsible. Mark develops a close friendship with Diane Butcher (Sophie Lawrence) and initially does not tell anyone about his HIV status. However, as he and Diane grow closer, he finally tells her the truth. He believes that he contracted the virus from Gill Robinson (Susanna Dawson), his girlfriend in Newcastle, who visits briefly later that year but leaves when she sees him kissing Diane. At first Mark tells Gill that he is not infected, but later admits the truth to her. Mark's relationship with Diane never becomes serious, but she is a good friend and confidante to the point where she persuades him to have counselling at the Terrence Higgins Trust. Mark initially turns on his male counsellor, relaying his bitterness at being a potential AIDS victim, but later feels the benefits of the counselling. Mark loves Diane for keeping his secret and he asks her to marry him but she gently refuses and leaves Walford to live in France.

Later that year, following the example of a friend Joe Wallace (Jason Rush) who had told his parents about being gay and HIV-positive, Mark decides to tell his parents. By now, he is dating Rachel Kominski (Jacquetta May), who advises him not to but Mark is tired of the pretence. On Boxing Day Mark tells Pauline and Arthur that he is HIV-positive. They sit in stunned silence while he scatters helpful leaflets around the house and then goes away for a while. On his return, he faces Pauline's irrational terror and Arthur's hostility. Arthur's ignorance is apparent initially as he fears that Mark will pass HIV on to him; he even bleaches everything Mark touches to avoid infection. Pauline and Michelle are understandably distraught, so they managed to help Arthur to understand the illness; in turn Arthur becomes more supportive for Mark. The situation seems to ease on Mark afterwards, but soon his romantic liaison with Rachel collapses to the point where they break up; the subsequent fallout between them at home prompts Mark to go back to his girlfriend Gill, who moves to London and becomes seriously ill. Gill's HIV has already progressed into AIDS and her deterioration is rapid. She is diagnosed with non-Hodgkin's lymphoma and goes into a hospice. Mark realises that he is in love with her and asks her to marry him. Mark and Gill marry, and their honeymoon consists of one night in a hotel, before Gill returns to the hospice and dies.

Not long afterwards, Mark befriends local teenage tearaway Mandy Salter (Nicola Stapleton); they get along at first but their friendship is severely tested when she becomes obsessed with him. Mark, still grieving for Gill, is horrified when he discovers that Mandy has been reading his late wife's diary and has dressed up in her clothes. Despite this, he invites Mandy to live with him after Den's friend Kathy Beale (Gillian Taylforth) throws her out. On Christmas Day, Mandy goes to visit her mother but is attacked by her stepfather; Mark arrives just in time to rescue her and invites her for Christmas dinner at the Fowler household.

Soon enough, Mark takes over running the family fruit and vegetable stall in the market after his uncle Pete (Peter Dean) leaves the square. He also begins casually dating his sister's housemate Shelley Lewis (Nicole Arumugam), but is reluctant to tell her about his HIV status. Whilst on a trip to Amsterdam, Shelley makes it clear to Mark that she wants to sleep with him – forcing him to admit his HIV status. Shelley is furious that he did not think to tell her this before and tells Mark she never wants to see him again. Mark takes the rejection badly and stops taking his HIV medication. During Christmas that year, he is rushed to hospital after collapsing. Mandy visits him in hospital and learns that he has HIV. When Shelley finds out that Mark is ill, she returns and admits that she really cares for him and they reconcile. However, Shelley tries to rush things by asking Mark to meet her family and go on holiday with her parents. She becomes infatuated and tries to spend as much time with him as she can. Mark fears that the relationship is moving too quickly and Mark decides to end it. When he tries to tell Shelley this, she uses emotional blackmail to stop him, saying that she has risked her health being with him so he owes her. When this does not work, she threatens to tell everyone about his HIV status, but leaves Walford when her bluff does not work.

Following Joe's death of an AIDS-related illness, Mark meets a Scottish woman named Ruth Aitken (Caroline Paterson); she is there visiting a friend. After a brief conversation, the two decide to go for a drink together. They start dating and Ruth copes with his HIV status but her father, a strict Presbyterian minister, refuses to give his blessing to her relationship with Mark and disowns her when she announces her plans to marry Mark. They marry in Scotland but problems surface in their marriage. She persuades Mark – and herself – that she is happy about not having children (due to the inevitable spread of the AIDS virus to herself and the baby), but it is soon clear that she is fooling herself.

In 1996, Mark is injured from a brawl in The Queen Victoria public house; he had saved the square's local hardman, Grant Mitchell (Ross Kemp), from getting glassed by an aggressive punter. However, after calling the ambulance, Grant overhears Ruth telling the paramedics about Mark's HIV status. Around this time, Mark wins money at an illegal poker match that takes place at the Bridge Street Cafe run by Steve Elliot (Mark Monero) and gives the money to Arthur to put towards his Wilderness Flowering Fund. However, problems emerged when Arthur is arrested and charged with embezzlement after being framed for the crime by his old friend Willy Roper (Michael Tudor-Barnes). Realising that he needed to account for his share towards the fund, Mark tells the police but he needs a witness. He asks Steve to help, but Steve is not willing to help due to fear of repercussions with the two gangsters who organised the game. Arthur spends a stretch in prison, leaving Mark devastated. Steve eventually decides to help, but is then forced to leave Albert Square when he is threatened by the criminal firm. Arthur is eventually released.

To add to his problems, Mark is further devastated when Arthur dies of a brain haemorrhage in May 1996 – after being injured in a prison riot several weeks earlier and the Fowlers are in mourning. During this time, Mark's HIV issues escalates when Kathy's infant child Ben (Matthew Silver) becomes seriously ill and Grant informs his brother Phil (Steve McFadden) – the child's father – about the situation. Grant blackmails Ruth, telling her that she has until Arthur's funeral to give up babysitting Ben or he will tell the whole square about Mark's HIV status. Soon enough Phil and Kathy find out the truth about Mark's condition, which causes Ruth to lose her job as a child minder. Mark confronts Grant after learning he blackmailed Ruth about his HIV status, but Grant reassures Mark that he will not tell anyone else. On the day of his father's funeral, Mark becomes angry that Willy had attended and assaults him at the cemetery. He believes that he was the one who caused Arthur's death.

A few weeks later, Mark's HIV status becomes public knowledge after an argument in the Queen Victoria between Pauline and fellow punter Ted Hills (Brian Croucher) is overheard by Phil and Grant's mother Peggy (Barbara Windsor) - as she had heard Ted tell Pauline that he knows that Mark has AIDS. Peggy then spreads the gossip around the Square and the residents begin to boycott Mark's fruit and vegetable stall, fearing they will catch the virus; this shows their ignorance on their knowledge of HIV or AIDS. Pauline springs to her son's defence before she and Peggy have a vicious fight, but even Pauline cannot defuse the prejudice; at one point Mark comes home to find the words "AIDS scum" graffitied on his wall. This is too much and he decides to present his neighbours with a few facts about his illness; firstly by telling them that he does not have AIDS but is HIV positive, which is a non-contagious virus, forcing them to acknowledge their bigotry. Grant speaks to Mark the next day and tells him that no one is barred from The Vic unless he says so. Peggy remains uncertain, but is forced to realise that Mark might appreciate some support when she herself is diagnosed with breast cancer.

It is then Mark and Ruth foster a six-year-old girl named Jessie Moore (Chelsey Paden), but returning her to her mother proves too heartbreaking and their marriage goes into crisis. When his cousin Conor Flaherty (Seán Gleeson) shows a romantic interest in Ruth, who secretly comes to question her marriage by this stage, Mark becomes jealous and the relationship falls apart. After they divorce, Ruth succumbs to Conor's charms and becomes pregnant by him. Ruth subsequently leaves Walford after realizing she had to put the baby first and could not do so while still in Walford, so she leaves alone without Mark or Conor; henceforth Mark is left heartbroken once more.

In 2000, Mark's past troubles resurface when his old nemesis Nick returns to the square and the two revisit their longstanding feud with each other. This soon gets Martin (now played by James Alexandrou) involved when Nick attempts to ensnare him with drugs in a similar manner as he once did with Mark, who in response urges his brother to stay away from Nick to no avail. Towards the end of the year, Nick gets one over Mark after giving Martin ecstasy shortly after Christmas. When Mark discovers this, he decides to settle the score with his tormentor once and for all. Mark spikes Nick's drink, leads him up to the Walford viaduct, and watches delightedly as the intoxicated Nick falls – just as midnight strikes and 2001 commences. Nick survives the fall, but is left severely crippled and vows revenge against Mark. He enlists his son Ashley (Frankie Fitzgerald), who had recently befriended Martin, to take revenge on Mark. However, when Ashley is hesitant to kill Mark himself, Nick takes matters into his own hands and drains the brake fluid on his motorbike. The next day, Ashley – not knowing what his father had done – steals Mark's motorbike and attempts to run him over in a last-ditch attempt to impress his father, but is killed after he ends up crashing into the launderette. On the eve of Ashley's funeral, Mark and Nick have their final showdown when Nick attempts to kill Mark with a knife. Mark overpowers Nick, who then blurts out that he should've been the one on the motorbike instead of Ashley – thus exposing his involvement in his son's death. Mark berates Nick for causing his own son's death, then leaves him to be disowned by his mother Dot (June Brown) – who had just overheard Nick confess to his role in Ashley's death. At the end of Ashley's funeral, Mark watches as Nick leaves the square shortly afterwards and mutters to himself "Some people you're just glad to see the back of"; their rivalry is brought to an end as Mark and Nick would never see each again afterwards.

By 2001, Nick was not the only enemy Mark had been clashing with throughout the year. He embarked on a conflict with Phil after learning that the latter had been mistreating his girlfriend Lisa Shaw (Lucy Benjamin), whom Mark has been growing fond of from that point. Mark soon takes Lisa to live with him after she leaves Phil, and they start dating much to Pauline's speculation. Mark also defends Kathy's son Ian (Adam Woodyatt) from Phil on several occasions, particularly when Mark witnesses Phil attacking Ian and is forced to separate them. When Phil is shot on the night his archenemy Steve Owen (Martin Kemp) and Lisa's best friend Mel Healy (Tamzin Outhwaite) get married, Mark becomes a prime suspect as the police gather information on his hatred for Phil; this in turn leads which leads his godson Jamie (Jack Ryder) and cousin Billy (Perry Fenwick) to each separately accuse Mark of shooting Phil. One month later, Mark learns that Phil has recovered and checked himself out of the hospital to exact revenge – prompting him to find Lisa in order to protect her from Phil. When he finds them at her house, Mark learns from Phil that it was Lisa who shot him. Lisa confesses to shooting Phil. Despite this, Mark continues to defend Lisa and tells Phil that she is not totally responsible for the crime – stating that the abuse Phil had inflicted upon Lisa is what set the course of his shooting in the first place. Phil grudgingly comes to accept these terms, and decides to cover Lisa's involvement by framing his ex-business partner Dan Sullivan (Craig Fairbrass) for the crime. Mark and Lisa observe Phil planning to incriminate Dan in the shooting, even going as far as to get Steve and Mel involved with his plan. However, Dan is found not guilty and he takes revenge on Phil and Steve by kidnapping Mel and fleeing the country with a money ransom – all the while believing that Steve had shot Phil, meaning that Dan was never aware that Lisa had shot Phil in the first place.

In the aftermath of Phil's shooting, Mark and Lisa conduct a plan to pretend that she is expecting Mark's baby – as he had grown to love Lisa ever since her troubles with Phil had started. To facilitate their lie, Mark insists that he had taken all necessary precautions in relation to his HIV, and they fool everyone for a while. He later proposes to Lisa, shortly after her baby Louise is born. However, Mark is devastated to learn that Phil is actually the child's biological father. Eventually, Phil discovers the truth when Grant's former wife Sharon (Letitia Dean) informs him about Louise's true parentage, and Phil vows to take an active role in his daughter's upbringing. Mark and Lisa marry, but their happiness is short-lived: Lisa is still very much in love with Phil, who then decides to use this to his advantage by seducing her in order to get more access to Louise. After Sharon discovers Phil's ulterior motives, she talks him out of his plan and he ends the affair with Lisa; but this later becomes meaningless when Mark finds out, and after just five months of marriage, Lisa leaves Mark and resumes her affair with Phil. This causes Mark to break down by the time he eventually discovers this. After confronting Phil about the discovery, Mark goes back to Lisa and confronts her; but things get too far when Mark gets aggressive to the point where he is about to rape Lisa, but ultimately realizes what he is about to do and promptly stops himself from doing it. Horrified by his actions, Mark leaves Walford for a short while. It is then Lisa realises her mistake when living with Phil and wants to reconcile with Mark, but Pauline refuses to tell her where Mark has gone. Mark eventually returns at Christmas and he ends up supporting Martin, who is due to be in court for accidentally killing Jamie in a road accident.

In January 2003, Mark's doctor tells him that his body is rejecting the medication that will prolong his life and slow down the onset of AIDS itself. Accepting that he will not live for much longer, Mark decides to leave rather than let his family see him endure a slow and painful death. On 14 February 2003, he makes a tearful farewell to his family and friends and rides off on his motorbike, although he remains in contact with family. In April 2004, Martin receives a telephone call from Mark's nurse, informing him that Mark has died from an AIDS-related form of non-Hodgkin's lymphoma.

His body is returned to Walford and he is given a heartfelt send-off by the residents. Following his death, Mark would be referenced by his own family and friends during the subsequent years that go on in the square; particularly in 2011 when Mandy returns and reminisces about their friendship in a conversation with Ian; and again in 2015 when Nick ultimately dies from a drug overdose after recapping on his past crimes to Dot, including the time he tried to kill Mark at the time. Later on in 2023, when Martin (this time played by James Bye) learns that his best-friend and Sharon's half-brother Zack Hudson (James Farrar) is HIV positive, he comforts Zack and supports him by explaining how his late brother Mark went through the same thing.

== Reception ==
Following Mark's departure in February 2003, the BBC was accused of "killing" HIV victims' hopes. Edinburgh-based HIV charity Waverley Care reacted negatively to scriptwriters for "scaring" victims away from seeking treatment by "painting a bleak picture". Real-life HIV survivors also hit out at the BBC for destroying their hope by failing to give an accurate view of the range of treatment now available. However, soap bosses hit back and defended the storyline as an "accurate portrayal" of many real victims' experiences. They also pointed out that they had the backing of AIDS charity The Terence Higgins Trust. David Johnson, director of Waverley Care, said "Scriptwriters for EastEnders – and other soaps – carry a huge burden of responsibility. The current story is a difficult one because, although drug treatments are not straightforward for everyone, many people do very well on them. Encouraging people to come forward for testing is a key issue – the earlier an HIV diagnosis is made, the greater the likelihood of staying well on treatments. Our concern with the Mark Fowler storyline is that it will increase the fear associated with HIV, potentially discouraging people from being tested at all or from starting on drug treatments if they feel there is little hope for the future." A real-life HIV victim had been on a variety of combination therapy treatments since he was diagnosed HIV-positive. Mark's departure from EastEnders left the victim "outraged". He said, "I'm a big soap fan and, until now, feel that the HIV issue had been handled sensitively in EastEnders [...] I was very hurt and upset by the Mark Fowler story. He'd been told that there wasn't another combination of drugs available – even though he'd only had three. There are new developments in drug therapy all the time and I'm worried that this storyline will make people give up hope. Or that they won't start treatments in the first place."

In 2008, All About Soap included Mark's HIV plot in their list of "top ten taboo" storylines of all time. Their writer described it as one of the "taboos which have bravely been broken by soaps."

In 2020, Sara Wallis and Ian Hyland from The Daily Mirror placed Mark 37th on their ranked list of the Best EastEnders characters of all time, writing how he was "at the centre of one of the soap's most controversial storylines after he contracted the HIV virus".

== See also ==
- List of HIV-positive television characters
