= Melanie Clark Pullen =

Irish actress (1975–2022)

- Clark Pullen as Mary Flaherty in EastEnders
- Born: 2 July 1975; Bray, County Wicklow, Ireland
- Died: 29 March 2022 (aged 46)
- Occupation: Actress
- Years active: 1997–2022
- Television: EastEnders (1997–1999)
- Spouse: Simon Maxwell
- Children: 3

Melanie Clark Pullen (2 July 1975 – 29 March 2022) was an Irish actress, film producer and writer.

== Career ==
Born and raised in Ireland, Clark Pullen attended Newpark Comprehensive School and then studied drama at Trinity College, Dublin. Shortly after graduating, in June 1997, she was cast in her most notable role as Mary Flaherty in the BBC soap opera EastEnders. Playing the long-lost relative of Pauline Fowler (Wendy Richard), Clark Pullen remained in the role for 18 months until her departure in early 1999.

After Albert Square, she appeared in ITV's big-budget costume drama Lady Audley's Secret, starred in Catherine Cookson's A Dinner of Herbs and featured alongside Sir Richard Attenborough and Jenny Agutter in the remake of the classic The Railway Children, all in 2000. Other credits include Doctors (2000), The League of Gentlemen's Apocalypse (2005) and The Clinic (2006).

On stage, Clark Pullen starred as Mariane in Tartuffe at the Lyttelton Theatre in 2002; appeared as Perdita in Shakespeare's The Winter's Tale in the 2001 production at the National Theatre; and co-wrote and starred in Missing Stars at the Finborough Theatre in 2001.

In 2006, Clark Pullen wrote, directed and produced the short film Marion agus an Banphrionsa (Marion and the Princess), for which she won the Gradam Gael Linn award for the Best Short in the Irish Language at the 51st Cork Film Festival. She also produced another short, Sounds Good (2004), which was written by her partner, Simon Maxwell.

Clark Pullen appeared as Lisa Bacchus playing the wife of Policeman Sergeant John Bacchus in the BBC drama, Inspector George Gently.

== Personal life ==
Clark Pullen was married to the writer Simon Maxwell. After leaving EastEnders she admitted to suffering from panic attacks and depression as she struggled to cope with the instant fame she received from being in such a high-profile show. In a bid to help others cope with depression she teamed up with another writer, Aoife Maguire, to create Missing Stars, a play that was staged in 2001 in which she also starred. The purpose of the play was to show sufferers of depression that help is available.

Having initially been diagnosed with breast cancer in January 2019, one year later, she was given the all clear by doctors. She died from a brain tumour on 29 March 2022, at the age of 46. It is unclear if the cancer which claimed her life was related to the one with which she had originally been diagnosed. She was survived by her husband, three children, and her sister.
