= Seán Gleeson =

English actor, director and producer

- Born: London, England
- Occupations: Actor; director; producer
- Television: Conor Flaherty in EastEnders (1997–1999); Ronnie Woodson in Doctors (2003–2009)
- Spouse: Stirling Gallacher (m. 2009)
- Children: 3

Seán Gleeson (born in London) is an English actor, director and producer, known for his roles as Conor Flaherty in the BBC soap opera EastEnders and Ronnie Woodson in the BBC soap opera Doctors. As well as acting, Gleeson also works as a director and producer, with credits on Doctors, Casualty and Holby City.

== Life and career ==
In 1997, Gleeson began playing Conor Flaherty in the BBC soap opera EastEnders. He stayed in the role until 1999, and in 2003, he joined the cast of the BBC soap opera Doctors as Ronnie Woodson. While on Doctors, he began a relationship with co-star Stirling Gallacher, who played George Woodson, his on-screen wife. The pair won the British Soap Award for Best On-Screen Partnership in 2007. Gleeson lives in Gloucestershire with Gallacher, and the pair were married in 2009, also having a son in the same year.

Whilst appearing on Doctors, Gleeson directed several episodes. After making the decision to stop portraying the role of Ronnie in 2009, he continued to direct episodes of Doctors until 2013. He then began directing episodes of the BBC medical drama Casualty, and later became a producer of the series in 2020. In March 2021, he was named as the new series producer of Casualty's sister series Holby City. On the role, he commented: "This is obviously an exciting opportunity. I'm really looking forward to getting stuck in and working with the crews, cast and whole Holby family on consolidating and reinvigorating this firm favourite for an even wider audience." He remained working on the series until its cancellation. From 2023 to 2024, he worked as a producer on the BBC daytime series Father Brown, before becoming a producer for the BBC primetime drama series Silent Witness in 2025.

== Filmography ==
=== As actor ===
Year	Title	Role	Notes
1996	Pie in the Sky	Luke Kelly	Episode: "Irish Stew"
1996	The Bill	Keith Boey	Episode: "Opportunity Costs"
1997	Underworld	Policeman Two	Recurring role
1997	The Woman in White	Glyde's Servant	Television film
1997–1999	EastEnders	Conor Flaherty	Series regular
2000	Burnside	Mark Evans	2 episodes
2000	Holby City	Griff Griffiths	Episode: "The Trouble with the Truth"
2001	Dalziel and Pascoe	Julian Beeson	Episode: "Walls of Silence"
2002	The Safe House	Danny Hyde	Television film
2003	Cold Mountain	Pistol	Film
2003–2009	Doctors	Ronnie Woodson	Series regular; 839 episodes
2010	Casualty	Michael Macintoch	Episode: "Hands On"
2010–2011	Hardy Bucks	Garda	2 episodes
2012	Public Enemies	Group Leader	Episode #1.2
2013	The Café	Father MacKenzie	Episode: "Reap What You Say"
2016	Midsomer Murders	Rod Barkham	Episode: "Harvest of Souls"
2017	The Foreigner	Billy Mahre	Film
2018	Shakespeare & Hathaway: Private Investigators	Ron Greevdale	Episode: "Ill Met by Moonlight"
2018	The Last Witness	Court Officer	Film
2018	Dark Justice	Brad Smith	Film
2018	No Shebert	James	Short film
2021	Deer Woman Child	Blacksmith	Film

=== As crew member ===
Year	Title	Role	Notes
1993	Betrayal of the Dove	Medical consultant	
2007–2013	Doctors	Director	48 episodes
2011	Letting Go	Director	Short film
2013–2017	Casualty	Director	11 episodes
2018	River City	Director	1 episode
2020–2021	Casualty	Producer	
2021–2022	Holby City	Series producer	
2023–2024	Father Brown	Producer	
2025	Silent Witness	Producer	

== Awards and nominations ==
Year	Award	Category	Nominated work	Result	Ref.
2007	British Soap Awards	Best Actor	Doctors	Longlisted	
2007	British Soap Awards	Best On-Screen Partnership (with Stirling Gallacher)	Doctors	Won	
2007	British Soap Awards	Sexiest Male	Doctors	Longlisted	
2008	British Soap Awards	Best Actor	Doctors	Longlisted	
