= Keegan Baker =

Fictional character from EastEnders

- EastEnders character
- Portrayed by: Zack Morris
- Duration: 2017–2022
- First appearance: Episode 5421; 9 January 2017
- Last appearance: Episode 6453; 17 March 2022
- Created by: Daran Little
- Introduced by: Sean O'Connor
In-universe information
- Other names: Keegan Butcher-Baker; Keegan Kayden Baker
- Occupation: Student; Road sweeper; Waiter; Sandwich salesman
- Father: Mitch Baker
- Mother: Karen Taylor
- Sisters: Chantelle Atkins
- Half-brothers: Keanu Taylor; Riley Taylor; Chatham Taylor
- Half-sisters: Bernadette Taylor; Bailey Baker
- Wife: Tiffany Butcher (2019–2022)
- Uncles: Avery Baker
- Aunts: Kandice Taylor
- Nephews: Mackenzie Atkins; Roland Highway
- Nieces: Mia Atkins; Peggy Taylor
- First cousins: Felix Baker

Keegan Baker (also Butcher-Baker) is a fictional character from the BBC soap opera EastEnders, played by Zack Morris. He first appeared in episode 5421, broadcast on 9 January 2017, transpiring to be a school friend of established character Shakil Kazemi (Shaheen Jafargholi). Morris began filming in November 2016 and Keegan was introduced to become prominent in storylines focusing with other teenage characters, namely Shakil, Bex Fowler (Jasmine Armfield), and Louise Mitchell (Tilly Keeper). Initially characterised as an arrogant and spiteful bully, Keegan's character became more sensitive and sympathetic throughout his time on the soap, particularly following the introduction of his family – the Taylors – in June 2017. During the family's announcement and promotion, it was kept secret that Keegan was their relative.

Keegan and Shakil became the focuses of a storyline about gang violence in 2018, which saw both characters be stabbed, resulting in Shakil's death. The storyline was considered as one of the most important in the show's history by executive producer John Yorke. In the aftermath of the stabbing, Keegan began a relationship with Tiffany Butcher (Maisie Smith), with the couple marrying in November 2019. Morris opined that despite their character's young ages, their attraction was genuine as they were bonded by both having to mature quickly. In February 2022, it was announced that Morris had left the soap to pursue other projects. The actor sang praises of his co-stars before Keegan and Tiffany departed in episode 6453, broadcast on 17 March 2022, being given a rare happy ending to their story. Keegan's character development and storylines often attracted critical praise during his run, with Morris securing several awards and nominations for his portrayal.

== Development ==
=== Casting and introduction ===
Keegan made his first appearance on 9 January 2017. Zack Morris's casting was announced by his theatre school D&B Academy of Performing Arts beforehand, which he still attended when he received the part, with the school promising that he would be "one to watch". He was introduced on a six-month contract as a friend of Shakil Kazemi (Shaheen Jafargholi). A show insider told the press Keegan would become more promenant in the show's storylines with the other teenage characters, namely Shakil, Bex Fowler (Jasmine Armfield), and Louise Mitchell (Tilly Keeper), and that he would continue "to cement his reputation as a troublemaker". Keeper revealed that herself and Morris had the same agent and knew each other for years prior to his casting. Morris reported that he was "having a ball" playing a villain like Keegan, and sang excitement about his new role, but described it as "daunting" to join EastEnders as: "EastEnders is a show that's been going on for so many years and it's such a big part of British television. But when you get there, everybody is so nice to work with – all of the directors and all of the cast. So it's a nice, easy place to settle in".

I was filming on the market on my first day. It was all a bit overwhelming to be honest, because of the fast pace. But you do get used to it, and it teaches you to be prepared from the off.

— Morris discussing his first day of filming.

Morris disclosed that he began filming in November 2016, and that the audition process was "quite a while" before that. He explained his audition process for Keegan: "When I had my original audition, I didn't hear anything back for quite a while, so I actually assumed that I didn't get it. But after a few more weeks, I heard that I had another audition and it all worked out from there". After he was cast, Morris had Jamie Borthwick, who played Jay Brown, as a mentor on set, whom he praised for being "very wise for such a young guy" and for giving "great advice". Morris found it "nerve-wracking" to join the show, labelling the role of Keegan as "the biggest job" he had ever gained and found it enjoyable to play a villain, commenting "it's so much more fun", despite clarifying that he was "not like Keegan in real life". When asked if viewers would be able to warm up to Keegan, Morris responded: "That's something you'll have to keep watching to find out. As much as you guys don't know what's coming up, we don't know what's happening in the future either". The actor himself commented that he would "like" for Keegan to be deeper than it first appeared, but reiterated that he didn't know what would happen. After Keegan began receiving mixed reactions, Morris took it as a "positive" as "the viewers are buying that I'm evil, so I'm fine with that".

=== Characterisation ===
Upon his arrival, Keegan is in his mid teens. Daniel Kilkelly of Digital Spy billed Keegan as a "villain" and a "new bad boy" for the soap. When asked to describe Keegan, Morris called his character "cocky", "aggressive", and that he "thinks he's the leader of the pack". He added that Keegan "thinks he's a bit bigger than what he is", and concluded: "All in all, he's a bit of a dick, really". The actor hoped Keegan would eventually grow on people, but said there wouldn't be many "redeeming features" for his character. He added that a key trait of Keegan's is to "shock" people. Morris described Keegan as "boisterous", and noted that he knew people like Keegan during his own time at school, adding that people-watching often helped him represent people's characteristics. Morris detailed that during his own school years, he wasn't "extremely naughty" or "extremely good", finding himself identifying with his character's "cheekiness" and not his "bullying". The actor explained that Keegan has "a bad sense of humour", "finds the wrong things funny", and "has no sense of judgement". He compared Keegan to "a bull in a china shop" who "smashes through" his obstacles. Morris further described his character as "cheeky and obnoxious", detailing that Keegan "likes to be the leader of the pack". Morris explained that Keegan "has a very short fuse", and "doesn't back down".

Keegan has been described as a "nasty piece of work", a "teen tearaway", "disruptive", "volatile", and "tortured". Dainty noted that Keegan "has no respect for his elders, and generally just thinks he's a bit indestructible". Several critics have described Keegan as a "troublemaker" or "troublesome". Morris opined that Keegan wasn't the type to "redeem himself". Inside Soap's Allison Jones described Keegan as a "spiteful schoolboy" and a "terrible bully with a shocking lack of respect". Morris often explained his belief that Keegan's personality was born through "something in his past". The actor opined that he would get along with Keegan, finding some of his jokes funny, and adding that Keegan would back someone up "if [they] needed it". Throughout his time on the soap, it was often noted that Keegan's rough nature had softened. Duncan Lindsay of the Metro explained: "Keegan began his life in Walford as an odious character but he has been developed a lot since then and despite maintaining his edge, his deep love for his family and the root of his acting out have been explored more". Laura Morgan of Digital Spy described Keegan as a "reformed bad boy", adding that he had "proven that he's rather a sensitive, caring soul under all that bravado".

Morris disclosed that Keegan was introduced as an abrasive teenager to leave room for character development. Morris attributed Keegan's personality change to the introduction of his family and audiences learning more about him, explaining: "It's about understanding why he does the things that he does and says the things that he says. It's because of what his environment has been, and people might be able to relate to that". The actor has explained that a trait of Keegan's include struggling to control his emotions, explaining that: "He's not very good at showing emotion and keeps things under wraps. For Keegan it just bubbles up until he's about to erupt". When asked what advice he would give his character, Morris responded that he would tell Keegan to "think before [he] acts", adding that his character "needs to realise that every action has a consequence". Morris has also said Keegan is "not the type of person to ask for any help".

=== Role in the Taylor family ===
In April 2017, when Morris was asked if he would like to see the introduction of Keegan's family, he responded that "It would be nice, but you've just got to play it by ear (Note: Phrase meaning "to do something without special preparation".)". He added that there was potential that the introduction of his family could "show a different side" to Keegan, but admitted that himself and his co-stars didn't know where things would go. He later reiterated the scentiment, disclosing he wanted to explore more of Keegan's backstory, as "horrible people" tend to have a reason for their actions. He teased that Keegan had "good stuff" coming and that the upcoming storyline may make viewers "feel sorry" for the character. In May, the show announced that it would explore why Keegan is "the way he is". On whether Keegan could be redeemed after months of drama for the character, Morris opined that his character wouldn't be the type to redeem himself, but wanted to see "other aspects" of Keegan's character and admitted he would enjoy seeing Keegan get "on the straight and narrow (Note: Phrase referring to "the way of living that is honest and morally proper".)". Prior to his family's introduction, Morris promised: "I feel like the stuff in the summer is the main thing to look out for".

In May 2017, the show announced that a new "big" and "loud" family, the Taylors, would be introduced later in the year. The family was to be headed by the "fierce" Karen Taylor (Lorraine Stanley), who would join alongside her children Keanu Taylor (Danny Walters), Bernadette Taylor (Clair Norris), Riley Taylor (Tom Jacobs), and Chatham Taylor (Alfie Jacobs). Despite being set to "kick up chaos", the family had "warmth at the heart". It was known that Chantelle was an offscreen other child. It was further promised that "at least one of the members of the clan is carrying a secret". Arrived in Walford "with a bang". In the "dying minutes" of the Taylor family's debut episode, Keegan was revealed to be part of the family, as he was Karen's son. It was not mentioned prior to the family's arrival that Keegan was a member. Speaking about filming with his new co-stars, Morris admitted it was "so weird at first" to have his own home on the show, as most of his scenes had been in school or in Albert Square, but considered his character getting a home to be "reassuring and a comfort in a way" as it felt like it solidified his place in the show. He commented that the family's offscreen dynamic was very positive.

It's so good for me to have a family in the show. When I first come in, Keegan was this little sod out of nowhere, but having the Taylors lets viewers see just why he is the way he is.

— Morris on the introduction of Keegan's family.

Discussing Keegan's relationship with his brother Keanu, Morris explained that the characters had "a bit of a rivalry" due to their opposing personalities and close age range, explaining: "The age gap is quite close – Keegan is 15 and Keanu is 18 – Keegan's a boisterous character, while Keanu wants to be the man of the house and bring the money in, so there's a bit of rivalry there". Morris explained that both Keegan and Keanu enjoyed getting into mischief together, as it "connects" them, noting that it would be explored in an upcoming scene. He continued explaining the rivalry as "Keanu is always trying to be the better one in the family and Keegan resents that, so there's always a bit of bickering or arguing or as if there's about to be a fight. It's that kind of tension". Stanley later opined that her character would "not having anyone say anything bad" in regards to her children, and that her instinct was to "protect" Keegan and her other children.

"Another side" to Keegan was teased during Bernadette's miscarriage storyline, as Keegan would find the ordeal of grieving the baby "particularly difficult", though would try to act uncaring. In February 2018, it was announced that Keegan's father, Mitch Baker (Roger Griffiths) would make his debut in March in a guest role, promising to be "more trouble for the Taylor family" Morris explained that he was "really excited" for Mitch to be introduced, referring to him as "the missing piece" in the family. He noted that he often wondered what Keegan's father was like, having it "always in the back of [his] mind". Hearing that Keanu's father stabbed Karen helped Keegan see Mitch as "less bad by comparison", with Morris explaining: "It gives him a bit more of an understanding of why it would have been difficult for Mitch to stay around, with that having gone on". If the secret got out, Morris suggested it "would probably tear the family apart". Following Mitch's departure, Keegan was said to have had his "heart broken". The actor teased that the upcoming year would have a lot in store for the family, adding: "We've established who we are, what we're about and now we're embedding more into different people's storylines and getting to know different characters".

In November 2018, Mitch made his return to the show "on a mission to make amends" Morris explained Keegan's reaction as follows: "As you can imagine, Keegan's not very happy about it. It's a mixture between confusion and just frustration, really. Last time Mitch was there they started to rebuild their relationship and it was the kind of relationship Keegan always wanted. Then, as soon as it started going well and he started to trust Mitch again, he suddenly left. Mitch did what he always does, but Keegan had put his guard down – he didn't think his dad would do it to him again, but he did". Mitch returned with his daughter Bailey Baker (Kara-Leah Fernandes), he was teased to "bear the brunt" of Keegan's "simmering rage" after "repeatedly" letting Keegan down. Giving Mitch "the cold shoulder", Keegan was teased to get a "big reality check" upon finding out that Bailey's mother Dinah Wilson (Anjela Lauren Smith) was terminally ill. He was set to become "increasingly concerned" for Bailey's welfare after seeing Dinah become rapidly more frail and realising she needed to go to a carehome. Morris was enthusiastic about more of Keegan's family members being introduced, opining "It's really good that the family has grown the way it has, it gives us new avenues to take the characters down, which is fun". He added that he enjoyed filming scenes with Fernandes, as they showed Keegan's "softer side" and Fernandes was professional for her age.

=== Relationships with other characters ===
==== Bex Fowler ====
The show first announced Keegan's bullying of Bex Fowler in February 2017, where it was said he would take "nasty revenge" on her on behalf of Shakil, who falsely believed Bex shared a nude photo of him. Bex would quickly move on from Shakil after breaking up with him, adding fuel to Keegan's thirst for revenge. Details provided were meager, but it would transpire that Bex's world would "be turned upside down" as a result. The revenge entailed Keegan imposing Bex's face over a pornographic video and resulted in Bex being cruelly bullied by Madison Drake (Seraphina Beh) and Alexandra D'Costa (Sydney Craven). Morris commented that when he was in school, situations like Bex and Shakil's where nude photos were shared weren't particularly uncommon, finding it important to tackle the issue as: "in schools now, the situation with the nude photos does happen, and a lot of people get scarred from it". Morris opined that the bullying storyline was important to show on TV as it is a common experience and he disclosed that himself and Armfield were close in real life. When asked if Keegan deserved a comeuppance, Morris responded: "I feel like he needs to, but I think it would take a big character to test him. You need someone who's a big character to put him in his place". It was deemed afterwards that Keegan had "made Bex Fowler's life a misery" after he the incident.

==== Louise Mitchell ====
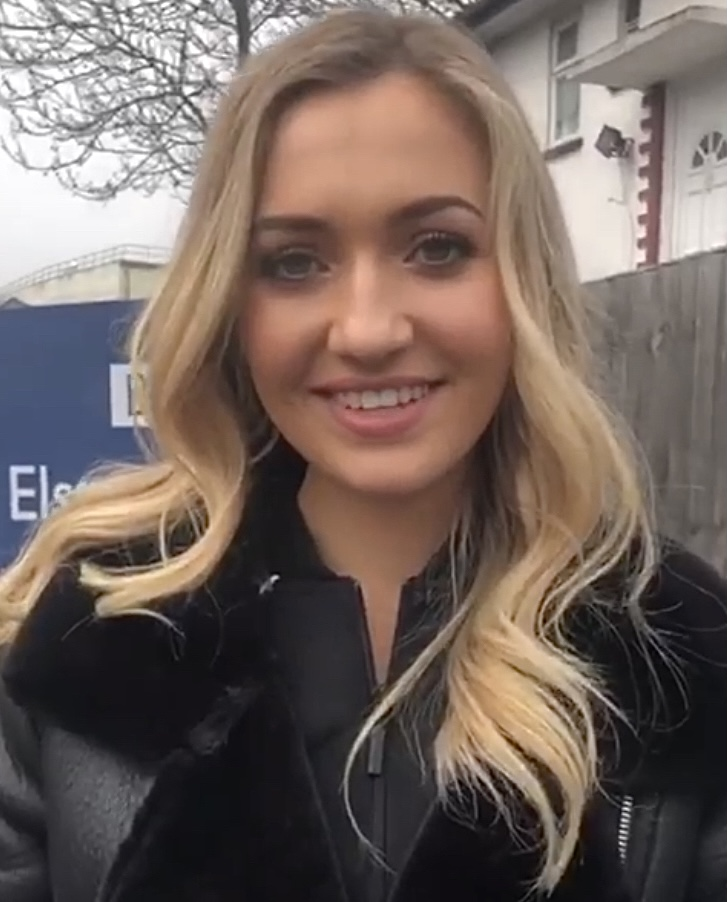
Keegan would initially "clash" with the character Louise Mitchell (Tilly Keeper, pictured), before developing a crush on her.

When asked about what kind of relationship Keegan and Louise would have, Keeper teased the characters would "clash from the offset" and "he is going to be causing trouble – and not just for Louise". In June 2017, it was announced that Keegan's second target of his torment would be Louise, set to turn her world "upside down". The ordeal was teased to be "tragic" and would traumatize Louise as Keegan would spread "an awful rumour" about Louise to leave her "devastated" as a way to "jeopardise her new-found happiness" with her new love interest, Travis Law-Hughes (Alex-James Phelps). The "can of worms" opened by Keegan was later hinted to leave Louise "traumatised" and "bewildered". The event transpired that Keegan claimed that he slept with her during a party where Louise had her drink spiked and was drunk as a result. It was initially ambiguous weather Keegan sexually assaulted Louise or if it was just a "vivacious" lie to embarrass her. After Keegan's family move into Walford, Louise and Bex were "aghast" to see them move in neighbourhood. Louise began to fear she had contracted chlamydia and went on to tell police that Keegan had raped her. He confided in Karen that he made it up since her "fancied her" and eventually owned up to his lies, but not before a distraught Louise had gone through a harrowing ordeal at the police station and been dumped by her boyfriend Travis.

Keegan seemingly "redeemed himself" to Louise after helping her at the school prom. Louise had also since ended her friendship with Travis before in December 2017, Morris expressed interest in the pair becoming a couple in the future, revealing that he had received many messages from fans who hoped the two would embark on a relationship, despite his character's "somewhat chequered past with Louise", he hoped the writers would "give [viewers] what they want" as well as finding it "a new and interesting dynamic" as it would be his first time acting in a relationship. David Brown of Radio Times opined that a relationship was "not beyond the realms of possibility" for the characters, despite admitting that Louise would need to be "pretty forgiving" for one to happen. The relationship was described by Laura Morgan of Digital Spy as: "Boy meets girl, boy bullies girl, boy actually realises he's smitten with girl". Keegan was "struggling to pluck up the courage" to tell Louise his feelings. As Louise grew closer to newcomer Hunter Owen (Charlie Winter) and "set her sights firmly" on him, Keegan would become "desperately" persistent in keeping her attention, but would be "heading for heartbreak". The storyline was considered a love triangle in which Keegan and Hunter fought for Louise's affection.

In November 2018, the show revisited the potential romance, as a "light at the end of the tunnel" for Keegan after enduring a "horrible few months". It was also disclosed that Keegan had "been harbouring feelings" for Louise for a long time. As Louise had broken up with Hunter, Morris remained on board with the potential story, enthusing that it "would definitely be an interesting road to go down". Morris opined that his character remained interested in Louise, as since Keegan's arrival, he shared "lots of little moments" with Louise. He added: "Whatever the producers want to do, I don't mind. From the get-go, Keegan's always had a thing for Louise, so whether that's something they will invest in, you'll just have to wait and see". After Keanu shared a kiss with Louise, Morris warned that Keegan's reaction would be one of fury, noting that as Keegan had "hoped to solidify" his relationship with Louise, he would go from "one extreme to the other". When asked about Keegan's reaction to the kiss, Morris replied that Keegan would be "fuming" and he would struggle to watch his brother "kiss his girl". He added that "everything would be sweet and happy" between Keegan and Louise "in an ideal world", but that it wouldn't "work out" because of Keegan's unstable frame of mind.

==== Shakil Kazemi ====
Keegan built a friendship with Shakil during the revenge storyline on Bex, Duncan Lindsay of Metro suggested that Shakil had been "dragged along" by Keegan and his antics. Despite this, it was reported that Shakil would have enough of Keegan's behaviour, leading to a fight between them.

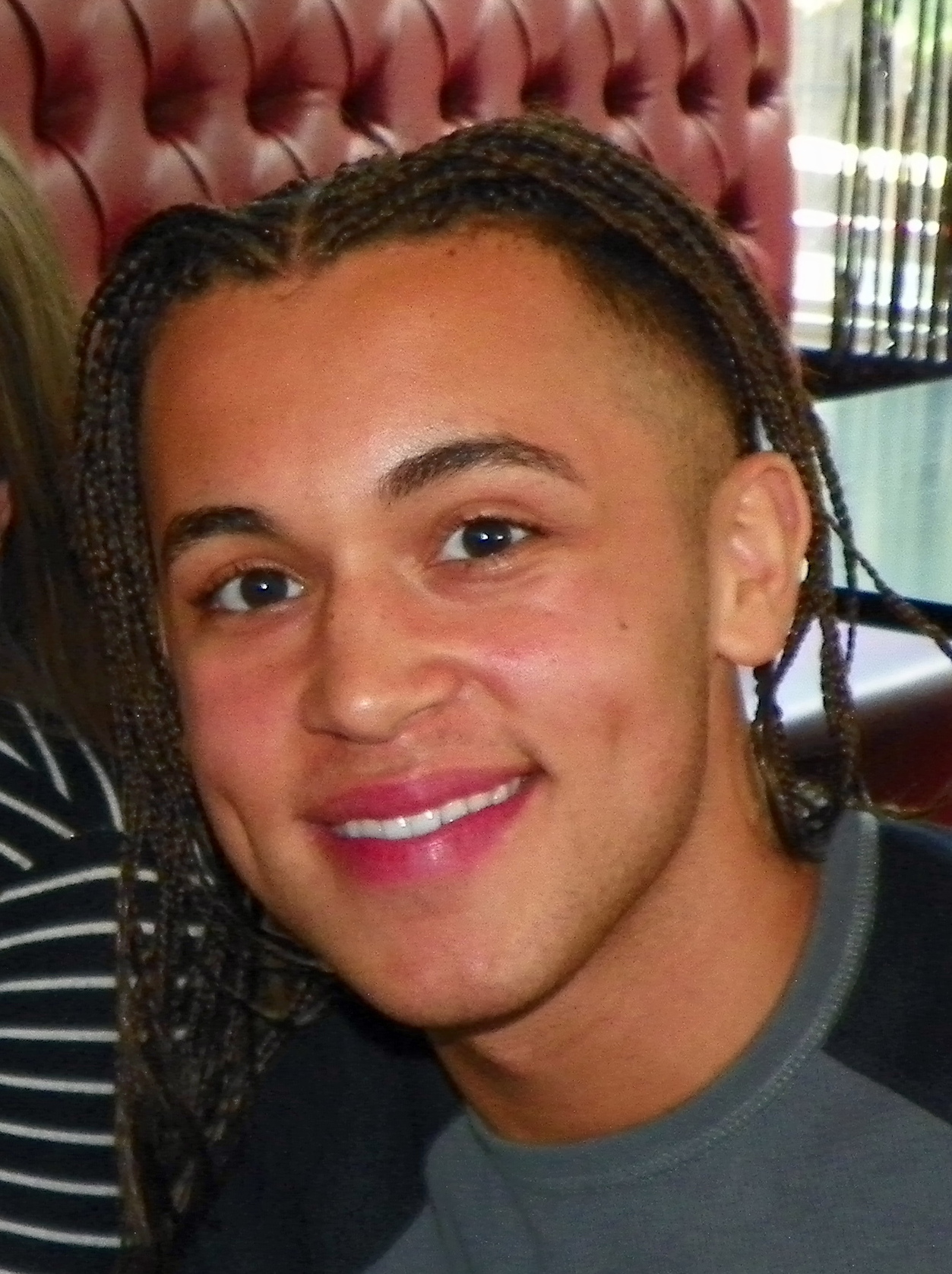
Keegan and his friend Shakil Kazemi (Shaheen Jafargholi, pictured), became involved in a storyline about knife crime amongst teenagers, resulting in Shakil's death.

In March 2018, it was announced that Keegan and Shakil would be placed at the centre of a storyline tackling gang violence and knife crime in teenagers. Set to air later in Spring 2018, details surrounding the story involved both Keegan and Shakil being stabbed by a youth gang and left for dead. The upcoming storyline was teased to be "hard-hitting" and show Keegan and Shakil be attacked, as a way of depicting how wide the ramifications of knife crime were. It was not initially confirmed whether Keegan or Shakil would be killed off as part of the storyline but the outcome of the attack would "rock the families and the whole Square to the core". The show worked with former EastEnders actress Brooke Kinsella, who played Kelly Taylor, founder of the Ben Kinsella Trust, a charity focused on preventing knife crime, after her brother, Ben Kinsella was stabbed to death in June 2008. Kinsella praised the show for tackling the issue, stating: "I commend the EastEnders team for choosing this storyline to portray the realities of knife crime. With knife crime on the increase it is vitally important that we help people understand its lasting impact". Executive consultant John Yorke added that since knife crime remained a common and serious crime, it was "more important than ever" to showcase its nature and impact on families and communities. Yorke considered the issue to be "one of the most important the show has ever embarked on", teasing that the upcoming episodes would prove "powerful, heart-breaking and dramatic".

After the stabbing resulted in Shakil's death, with Keegan surviving, the incident sent "shockwaves" through Albert Square. Keegan was "traumatised" by the stabbing and was set to be "seething with rage" over what happened, set to plan "violent revenge" on the perpetrator, Bruno (Josh Fraser), "determined" to receive justice for Shakil. Morris explained that Keegan felt "frustrated", "very upset and angry" following Shakil's death as he was "confused about what happened and how people can just be moving on", adding that Keegan partly "blames himself". Morris also admitted that he felt "mixed emotions" upon being told about the story, describing the news as "bittersweet" as telling a "necessary and relevant" story came at the cost of Jafargholi being axed. Keegan would try to gain information about the gang as the first step of his goal. Daniel Kilkelly of Digital Spy saw the storyline as an opportunity as "the start of a big new journey for Keegan". Morris teased that Keegan and Shakil's mother Carmel Kazemi (Bonnie Langford) would interact more. Later details presented Keegan tracking down Bruno and "would put his fate in Carmel's hands", to her horror as she would try convincing him "that more violence is never the answer". Morris commented that it was a "privilege" and "very important" to be involved in the story, but noted that being involved came with "a responsibility" to try and raise awareness.

Following the stabbing, Morris disclosed that there would still be "a lot of hard-hitting" events for Keegan, as losing Shakil was "a lot for him to deal with". He explained: "He is going to need to find ways of dealing with what happened to Shakil. There is only so much he can do before it starts becoming a strain. He has to find a way of dealing with things, or he will drive himself insane". Keegan murdered one of his attackers as revenge, with it being later revealed that it was a plan of Carmel's to teach Keegan "a valuable lesson" about knife crime, and that he hadn't murdered anyone. With the grief of losing Shakil "tipping Keegan over the edge", and struggling to cope with it, Keegan received drugs from Jagger Rawley (Aaron Thomas Ward), a move he was "bound to regret". When Morris was later asked if losing Shakil had changed Keegan for the better, he responded: "Yeah, it's given him more depth, so that will always be an underlying factor for Keegan. But he's matured which is also good for me because I'm growing up – so he has grown up with me".

==== Tiffany Butcher ====
Throughout 2018, Keegan developed a friendship with Tiffany Butcher (Maisie Smith). The show announced that Tiffany would find an "unlikely ally" in Keegan after "opening up" to him. He would try comforting her for her fears, and Tiffany would confide in Keegan in a "heart-to-heart". Tiffany later shared a kiss with Keegan's sister Bernadette. Later, when Tiffany sees Keegan accept a bag of drugs from Jagger, since "there's no way after everything he's been through she'd let him spiral down into drug abuse". Tiffany later told Jagger to stay away from Keegan, with Jagger only agreeing if he got the drugs back, which was bad since they had been disposed of, leading viewers to wonder if Keegan would be targeted again. Tiffany later pushed drugs on Keegan as a bid to impress her friend and gang leader Evie Steele (Sophia Capasso). As Keegan's sister Bernadette had come to terms with her sexuality and her crush on Tiffany, after Keegan and Tiffany shared their first kiss in May 2019, Morris teased that a love triangle between the siblings and Tiffany, commenting "[The show does] love a triangle! It seems to work" on This Morning.

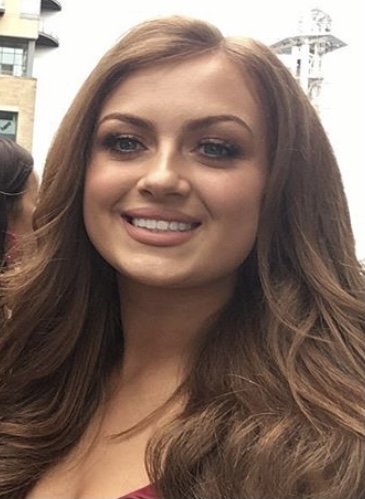
Tiffany Butcher (Maisie Smith, pictured) was Keegan's second romantic partner and his eventual wife.

Keegan and Tiffany briefly ended their spark to protect Bernadette's feelings, but when Bernadette found a match on a dating app, the show teased that Keegan and Tiffany's "spark" would be revisited, resulting in a bitter argument. After Tiffany decided to leave Walford with her mother Bianca Jackson (Patsy Palmer), Gray urges Keegan to stop her, so Keegan decides to "fight for a future" with her at the last minute, convincing Tiffany to stay. Morris commented that he and Smith enjoyed working together and teased that there would be "lots of stuff to come for Tiffany and Keegan". The actor opined that Keegan and Tiffany's relationship worked on shared experiences and similar personalities, explaining: "I feel as if they are good for each other. They've both been through some difficult things and have similar personalities. They both have fireiness, but they're good people deep down. I think Keegan can be there for Tiffany, because he can relate to her experiences". Smith commented that the characters' relationship was "100% genuine" and she hoped they would stay together, explaining: "They have been through so much individually and for them to fall in love shows how much they each have individually grown as characters". In September 2019, the show teased that Keegan and Tiffany's "tentative" relationship would become "more of a focus". Executive producer Jon Sen described their developing relationship as "lovely" and "a wonderful dynamic", praising Morris and Smith's performances. He promised that the show would be "investing" in their "oads of warmth and heart" in the upcoming Autumn. Smith opined that their relationship was "beautiful" as "they're both so vulnerable", adding that "they have a great dynamic".

Their romance was teased to "step up a gear" later in September. Smith noted that the fast development of the relationship was because "they have been forced to grow up much quicker than others". After Tiffany froze while she became intimate with Keegan, for Keegan's first time, she was "visibly uncomfortable", leaving Keegan "confused about Tiffany's commitment to their relationship". After she explained that her tensity was due to being raped in the past, Keegan walked out on her "full of anger", but later assured her his rage was towards her rapist. A "secret wedding" for the couple, set to air in November 2019, was confirmed after Morris and Smith were seen filming scenes on-location. Karen would try interfering with the event, as a source explained to Metro: "At first, Karen is not having any of it and she and the others even make a grab for Tiffany but by this point, the young couple have made their decision and there's no changing their mind". It was unconfirmed if the characters would actually become "man and wife". They eventually became engaged in October 2019. Smith teased that Karen would be the least supportive of the wedding, adding that the event would be "absolute chaos", despite admitting that she enjoyed filming it.

Keegan and Tiffany decide to elope earlier than they initially planned, as Smith explained: "Keegan with his bad temper ends up hitting Ian, which causes a bit of trouble. That's ultimately the reason they have to elope so quickly. I don't think their families are that supportive anyway, so they think that all they need is each other". The actress was initially "surprised" at how quickly the relationship resulted in marriage, but reiterated that Keegan and Tiffany had "bonded" through having to mature quickly, opining that "Going on the run as they end up doing is not exactly how they dreamed it would be, but it doesn't matter – she is in love so marrying him any way she can will make her happy". Smith explained that their determination to marry at such young ages was simply as they were "madly in love" with each other. Keegan and Tiffany married in November 2019. Smith teased that the aftermath of their wedding would ssee them try to "understand what marriage actually means", doubting they "will stay happy forever". After tying the knot, upcoming events for the couple involved them "make their way as a young, married couple", including being "determined to prove the doubters wrong". Morris promised that there would be "good stuff" coming for the pair, with Smith promising "a lot of happiness" in the future, adding that: "The viewers will love it, we're loving it – it's all just so much fun".

=== Departure ===
Off we go... It's been an absolute Honour. Thank you everyone at [EastEnders] for you continuing love and support. AND a massive thank you to everyone who's supported me on this crazy journey. It's been real.

— Morris's Instagram story post thanking his fellow cast and crew members and bidding farewell to his time at EastEnders.

On 23 February 2022, it was announced that Morris had left the soap after five years. He had finished filming his final scenes at the time of the announcement, set to air in Spring of 2022. He had planned to leave since 2021 to explore other projects. It was suggested that he had warned producers of his upcoming departure earlier than intended to give the show an opportunity to "build up to an exit storyline". Speaking on his departure, Morris stated: "After five beautiful years on this incredible show, I have made the tough decision to leave Walford and give Keegan Butcher-Baker some well-earned rest". The actor considered that the show had "changed [his] life for the better" and was adamant that "it will always hold a real loving place in [his] heart". Executive producer Kate Oates commented that Morris had been an "incredible asset" to the show, "not just as a brilliant actor, but as an amazing company member". She continued by wishing him good luck for his future projects. In turn, Morris sang praises to his co-stars and the writers before explaining: "This show has given me so much, not just as an actor but as a man. These invaluable lessons I have learned at EastEnders will stay with me for the rest of my life. I will forever see this whole experience as the biggest blessing I could have ever asked for. I loved every second". He attributed the show to helping him learn new skills, namely "what it's like to be an actor" and working with different actors and directors.

Details surrounding Keegan's departure included that it would come as a part of Gray's downfall story, which involved the exposure that he murdered Chantelle, Keegan's sister. As Keegan and Gray had become closer, he would be "left reeling" to learn that Gray was "a monster". Shortly after the initial announcement of Keegan's departure, it was confirmed that Smith would return in a guest appearance as Tiffany for Keegan's exit story, having departed three months prior after a misunderstanding between the couple led to a breakup. It was reported that: "Bosses felt Tiffany had unfinished business with Keegan that needed a resolution before he left. So they decided to ask her back for one episode. Viewers will have to wait to see if they manage to fix their relationship or whether the bad blood that we've seen between them continues". Speaking on the nature of his "emotional" exit, Morris promised that "loose ends [would be] tied up" between Keegan and Tiffany. Morris was initially unaware that Smith would return for the exit, and was pleased that Keegan and Tiffany would be given a happy ending, explaining "there's also a bit of relief as in this moment [Keegan] feels quite alone". He elaborated that Tiffany's departure left Keegan feeling "alone" and "out of place" as "she's still his wife" and "he didn't want things to end [the way they did]".

Keegan and Tiffany are able to work out their issues and depart for Germany together in episode 6453, broadcast on 17 March 2022. Morris described leaving the show as "a mix of emotions" and compared his departure to leaving home. On Keegan's ending, Morris noted that "it felt good" to be given a happy ending, detailing: "When I first got sent the scripts, I was at home. I read the emails and it was nice – it put a smile on my face and brought a tear to the eye! It was nice". He hoped the more light-hearted departure would "stand-out" to viewers and expressed satisfaction about how the ending "rounded up everything that was left open with Keegan". When asked if he would return to the show in the future, Morris responded "never say never".

== Storylines ==
When Keegan arrives in Walford in January 2017, he quickly reconnects with his friend Shakil Kazemi (Shaheen Jafargholi). He soon establishes himself as a local menace after breaking Louise Mitchell's (Tilly Keeper) phone and repeatedly teasing her, stealing cigarettes from a shop, and annoying Denise Fox (Diane Parish) by trampling flowers in the gardens and insulting her, which results in her hitting him. Keegan informs the police, resulting in Denise having to pay Keegan £50, only for Keegan to continue disrespecting her. After Shakil tells him that his ex girlfriend, Bex Fowler (Jasmine Armfield), had sex with Preston Cooper (Martin Anzor), Keegan imposes Bex's face on a porn video and sends it to Madison Drake (Seraphina Beh) and Alexandra D'Costa (Sydney Craven). A naked photo of Shakil is uncovered when the police become involved, and Bex takes the blame despite being innocent.

When Keegan attempts shoplifting, he is stopped by Derek Harkinson (Ian Lavender). At a party, Keegan films a drunken Louise when she vomits after her drink is spiked. After Travis Law-Hughes (Alex James-Phelps) humiliates Keegan, Keegan lies to Louise by telling her that they had sex at the party while she was drunk. Louise is told that Keegan had previously passed chlamydia to another girl, which horrifies her but she tests negative. Louise is aghast to see that Keegan is moving to Albert Square with his mother, Karen Taylor (Lorraine Stanley) and half-siblings, Keanu (Danny Walters), Bernadette (Clair Norris), Riley (Tom Jacobs) and Chatham (Alfie Jacobs). Louise later claims that Keegan raped her. Keegan admits to Karen that he lied about them having sex because he likes Louise. Keegan is then arrested on suspicion of rape but is not charged due to a lack of evidence.

Derek confronts Keegan over shoplifting for a second time, recounting that his colleague Honey Mitchell (Emma Barton) caught him. Keegan accuses Honey of racism and calls Derek an "old queer" before leaving. Later, Derek refuses to serve Keegan because of his comments, but Keegan claims it was just "banter", and quickly pays and leaves. Alexandra and Madison enlist Keegan to help them ruin the school prom, planning to set off the sprinklers. Keegan is unable to turn them on but discovers Travis has set up a room with candles for Louise. This leads to Madison and Alexandra confronting Louise and Travis, with Alexandra pushing Louise onto the burning candles, igniting Louise's dress. Keegan stops them from leaving the prom and they are arrested. After Keegan turns 16, he takes a job sweeping the market. Keegan later grows jealous upon seeing Louise and Hunter Owen (Charlie Winter) hugging.

Keegan's estranged father, Mitch Baker (Roger Griffiths), arrives in Walford and despite initial skepticism, Keegan accepts Mitch and he settles in at the Taylor house. During his stay, Keegan overhears Karen and Mitch agreeing not to tell Keanu that his father received a 12-year prison sentence for stabbing Karen, with Keegan agreeing not to say anything about it. Mitch soon leaves after finding an envelope full of money intended for the upstairs neighbours, Ted (Christopher Timothy) and Joyce Murray (Maggie Steed), deciding to take the money and run, leaving Keegan angry and frustrated. Keegan steals a bicycle that belongs to a gang, which leads to him and Shakil being attacked with a knife by Bruno (Josh Fraser). While Keegan survives being stabbed in the neck, Shakil dies from being stabbed in the back. Bruno later is arrested, frustrating Keegan as he wanted to enact his own revenge.

Keegan admits his struggles to cope with the trauma and loss of Shakil to Shakil's mother, Carmel Kazemi (Bonnie Langford), swearing to take revenge on the gang. After Carmel discovers Keegan has a blade and takes it to the police, Keegan tells her that he is worried the gang are targeting him. Carmel displays anti-knife posters of Shakil around the Square. The posters are later vandalised. After an altercation with the vandal where Keegan cuts him with his blade, Carmel tells him that she found the vandal and that Keegan killed him, urging him to turn himself in to the police. Carmel later admits that Keegan did not kill anyone, and that she wanted to give Keegan a lesson. A vulnerable Keegan gains possession of drugs, but Tiffany Butcher (Maisie Smith) disposes of them. Louise seduces Keegan and they start a relationship before Keegan asks Tiffany for drugs. When Louise sees them, she destroys them.

In 2019, Keegan discovers that he has a half-sister, Bailey Baker (Kara-Leah Fernandes), from Mitch's second family. He bonds with her before Mitch tells Keegan that Bailey's mother, Dinah Wilson (Anjela Lauren Smith), is dying; Keegan overdoses on drugs and Bailey finds him collapsed and he is taken to hospital. He later meets Dinah, for whom Bailey is a carer, though he struggles at first seeing Bailey's situation but he later offers to visit Bailey and Dinah on his own and says he should seek professional help, as he is still affected by Shakil's death. Keegan's sister, Chantelle Atkins (Jessica Plummer), moves to Walford with her family. Keegan convinces Bailey that Dinah should go into a care home. When Bernadette starts dating a girl, Brooke (Ria Lopez), she realises that Tiffany and Keegan like each other. Keegan and Tiffany kiss before Keegan tells Bailey about her mother's death.

Tiffany becomes involved in a drug ring when she is groomed by Evie Steele (Sophia Capasso) and sells drugs to Keegan to help him block out the pain of Shakil's death, which causes Keegan to collapse. Despite this, they grow closer and enjoy a romance throughout 2019. Keegan furiously defends Tiffany when Louise insults her behind her back during Keegan's 18th birthday party. Keegan confesses to Tiffany that he is a virgin and she admits that she was raped whilst in the drug ring. Keegan supports her and sleep together for the first time in a hotel room. Following their first time together, Keegan proposes to Tiffany. Because Tiffany is 16, they cannot legally marry in England so the pair elope to Gretna Green in November 2019, despite attempts from Tiffany's aunt Sonia Fowler (Natalie Cassidy) to stop the wedding. At the wedding, Tiffany and Keegan hyphenate their names to Butcher-Baker.

Keegan and Tiffany enjoy a stable marriage, although occasionally struggle financially. They initially live in the flat underneath Karen before moving in with Sonia and Dotty Cotton (Milly Zero). Keegan and Tiffany start a sandwich-making business, named "Butcher, Baker Sandwich Maker", in a van bought by his brother-in-law Gray Atkins (Toby-Alexander Smith). Tiffany is asked to be a surrogate for her colleague Rainie Highway (Tanya Franks), which strains their marriage as Keegan is against this, so Tiffany declines. Keegan later cheats on Tiffany with Dotty in August 2021, despite Keegan's friend Vinny Panesar (Shiv Jalota) having feelings for Dotty. Keegan feels guilty when he returns from his one-night stand to find Tiffany collapsed on the floor from an allergic reaction. When Tiffany finds out, she furiously confronts Dotty.

Tiffany and Keegan separate due to Keegan's infidelity and plan to divorce despite their feelings for one another. Tiffany decides to move to Germany with her brother Liam Butcher (Alfie Deegan) and signs divorce papers before sending them to Keegan. Keegan is upset by Tiffany's departure and feels further betrayed when it is uncovered that Gray is a serial killer, one of his victims being Chantelle. Keegan sets fire to his sandwich van as Gray paid for it and the police become involved. Concerned for Keegan, Tiffany's adoptive sister Whitney Dean (Shona McGarty) calls Tiffany back to Walford. Keegan and Tiffany discuss their marriage, with Keegan and Tiffany discovering Liam was responsible for their break up. They decide to leave for Germany together and leave later in the day, with Keegan bidding farewell to Karen, Vinny, Mitch and Bailey.

In December 2023, Keanu is killed by Linda Carter (Kellie Bright). His funeral is held in June 2024. Through a phone call Tiffany has with Sonia, it is revealed that Keegan attended the funeral, though he is not seen onscreen.

== Reception ==
=== Awards and nominations ===
For his portrayal of Keegan, Morris earned nominations for the Best Newcomer at the 2017 British Soap Awards and the Best Soap Newcomer at the 2017 TV Choice Awards. In 2018, Morris was nominated for Best Actor and Best Young Actor at the International Achievement Recognition Awards, winning the award for the latter category. He was also longlisted for Best Actor at the 2018 Inside Soap Awards and placed 8th of the 12 nominees for Best Male Actor at the Digital Spy Reader Awards of the same year. In 2019, Morris received a nomination for the Best Serial Drama Performance at the 24th National Television Awards. At the 2019 British Soap Awards, Morris was nominated for both the Best Actor and the Best Male Dramatic Performance. Morris was also nominated for the Best Actor at the 2019 Inside Soap Awards and the Best Male Actor at the 2019 Digital Spy Reader Awards. The following year, Morris received another Inside Soap Best Actor nomination, as well as another Best Serial Drama Performance at the 25th National Television Awards.

=== Critical reception ===
Daniel Kilkelly of Digital Spy named Keegan's first scene "pretty memorable", wondering if his introduction was intended to serve as a foil to Shakil. One month after Keegan's introduction, Kilkelly proclaimed that Keegan was "certainly making his mark", describing the character as "troublesome" and a "bad influence". In Keegan's early time on the show, Morris said he had seen "a lot of mixed views" on his character, explaining that "A lot of people don't like Keegan and are proper hating on him, but that's what was expected. I planned for that and everyone else at EastEnders planned for that. That's what we always assumed would happen with a character like Keegan". He added that he was "pleased" with the public's reaction to his performance. Katy Brent of Closer claimed that herself and her colleagues "knew [Keegan] was trouble when he walked in". In February 2017, Duncan Lindsay of Metro commented that Keegan was "shaping up to be a seriously nasty character" in the show. Kilkelly (Digital Spy) called Keegan "Walford's newest bad boy". Lindsay (Metro) later praised the show for tackling bullying, commenting that Keegan was a "complete bully" and that Zack Morris is "deliciously contemptable" in the role. Alison Slade of WhatToWatch labelled Keegan as "the baddest baddie on the block right now". Lindsay (Metro) named Keegan's actions "despicable".

Sophie Dainty of Digital Spy called the reveal of Keegan being a member of the Taylor family a "huge bombshell". Her colleague, Daniel Kilkelly agreed, considering it a "smart move on the part of the bosses to take us all by surprise". Catriona Rigney of OK! reported that viewers were "left shocked" by the twist. Lindsay (Metro) opined it was a "surprise twist". He described Keegan's sex lie against Louise as "sick". Ian Sandwell of Digital Spy noticed that many fans of the show had theorised that Louise's father Phil would return to the show to "sort Keegan out". Daniel Kilkelly of Digital Spy named Morris as one of "Soapland's rising stars", writing that "Keegan may be rude, aggressive and very annoying most of the time, but there's no denying that Zack Morris has a screen presence and has caught everyone's attention with his scenes this year". Dainty commented: "We'd be lying if we said we weren't starting to warm to troublesome teen, but he could still do with being taken down a peg or two". Lindsay called the depth given to the Taylor family, particularly Keegan, "a well oiled soap trope and it seems to be paying off for this initially aggressive clan". Morris disclosed that viewer reactions to Keegan had changed since his introduction, admitting that he "never expected" Keegan to be as "accepted" as he is. He also recounted positive fan interactions, commenting "it's nice to have the support".

Justin Harp of Digital Spy described the scenes where Keegan and Shakil were stabbed as "horrific" and "brutal", reporting shocked and disturbed reactions from Twitter users. Daniel Kilkelly of Digital Spy said both Morris and Jafargholi "put in their best ever performances" during the scene, explaining: "Their on-screen agony this week has been genuinely uncomfortable and distressing to watch – as it should be". Following Shakil's stabbing, Lindsay (Metro) praised Morris's performance throughout for a "solid week of heavy drama". He declared Morris "surely a star of the future" and he "stole the show". He also said that "new layers to Keegan have been beautifully exposed by Zack", particularly "his explosion of angst in the wake of his fear he had killed someone" as it "was not just powerful but a really important performance given the spate of knife crime attacks in London". Kilkelly (Digital Spy) agreed, commenting "2018 has shown us what this talented young star is really capable of" as he "took centre stage" in the stabbing story. He predicted "much more drama" for Keegan as a result of Morris proving "how well he can handle" a serious plot. Kyle O'Sullivan of Mirror reported viewers were "stunned" by the "shocking" scene where Keegan murdered the vandal. Morris received messages on social media from individuals who told him about their experiences.

Justin Harp deemed that Keegan and Tiffany's romance had kicked off on a "rocky start". Lindsay opined that the chemistry between Keegan and Tiffany had "been obvious for some time" prior to their first kiss. Stephen Patterson commented that Keegan and Tiffany's relationship had been "anything but smooth" and described the proposal as a "shock". Brogan-Leigh Hurst of Mirror reported positive reactions towards Keegan's proposal, detailing that viewers "gushed" about the couple on Twitter. Keegan and Tiffany's wedding was considered a "surprise wedding that nobody saw coming" by Dainty. Claire Crick of What's On TV? called it a "shock" for the "teenage lovebirds" to wed. Duncan Lindsay commented that it seemed "awfully quick" for them to wed. Smith was overwhelmed by the online support for the couple, adding that "it's so lovely to have so much support from a fanbase". Duncan Lindsey said viewers were "delighted" to see Keegan and Tiffany get married. Upon the announcement of his exit, Duncan Lindsay called Keegan a "fan favourite", describing his departure as "the end of an era".

== See also ==
- List of EastEnders characters introduced in 2017
- List of soap opera villains
