= Bex Fowler =

Fictional character from EastEnders

- EastEnders character
- Jasmine Armfield as Bex Fowler (2025)
- Portrayed by: Alex and Vicky Gonzalez (2000–2002); Jade Sharif (2005–2007); Jasmine Armfield (2014–2025)
- Duration: 2000–2002, 2005–2007, 2014–2020, 2025
- First appearance: Episode 2020; 26 October 2000
- Last appearance: Episode 7104; 17 April 2025
- Introduced by: John Yorke (2000); Kathleen Hutchison (2005); Dominic Treadwell-Collins (2014); Chris Clenshaw (2025)
- Jade Sharif as Bex Fowler (2006)
In-universe information
- Other names: Chloe Jackson; Rebecca Miller
- Occupation: Student; Café worker
- Family: Fowler/Jackson/Branning/Beale
- Father: Martin Fowler
- Mother: Sonia Fowler
- Adoptive father: Neil Miller
- Adoptive mother: Sue Miller
- Stepmother: Stacey Slater; Ruby Allen
- Half-brothers: Arthur Fowler Jr (adoptive); Roman Fowler
- Half-sisters: Lily Slater (adoptive); Hope Fowler; Julia Fowler
- Grandfathers: Arthur Fowler; Terry Cant
- Grandmothers: Pauline Fowler; Carol Jackson
- Uncles: Mark Fowler; Robbie Jackson; Billie Jackson
- Aunts: Michelle Fowler; Bianca Jackson
- Nieces: Charli Slater (adoptive)
- First cousins: Vicki Fowler; Mark Fowler Jnr; Liam Butcher; Tiffany Butcher; Morgan Butcher; Sami Jackson; Whitney Dean (adoptive)
- Other relatives: Jim Branning; Jack Branning; Max Branning

Rebecca "Bex" Fowler (also Miller, originally known as Chloe Jackson) is a fictional character from the BBC soap opera EastEnders. Bex is the daughter of Martin (James Alexandrou/James Bye) and Sonia Fowler (Natalie Cassidy). She was born on-screen during the episode broadcast on 26 October 2000. Bex was played by twins Alex and Vicky Gonzalez from 2000 to 2002, and Jade Sharif from 2005 to 2007. The character was reintroduced in January 2014, with Jasmine Armfield taking over the role. On 28 January 2020, it was announced that Armfield had decided to leave the soap; she departed on-screen in the episode broadcast on 6 March 2020. In February 2025, it was announced that Armfield would reprise the role of Bex for a short stint following the death of the character's father Martin, and Bex returned on 2 April 2025 and departed on 17 April along with Sonia and Bianca Jackson (Patsy Palmer).

Her storylines on EastEnders included being put up for adoption after her birth and returning to her biological parents after the death of her adoptive parents, being caught up in a custody battle between her parents and her paternal grandmother Pauline Fowler (Wendy Richard), her relationship with Shakil Kazemi (Shaheen Jafargholi), forming a friendship with Louise Mitchell (Tilly Keeper), being bullied by Louise and her friends, dealing with the grief of Shakil being murdered, discovering that her love interest Preston Cooper (Martin Anzor) has been sleeping with her aunt Michelle Fowler (Jenna Russell), becoming infatuated with Sonia's boyfriend Gethin Pryce (Cerith Flinn), getting into the University of Oxford, developing an addiction to ADHD drugs, dealing with depression and running away, attempting suicide and overdosing during a boat party on the River Thames.

== Development ==
=== Reintroduction (2014) ===
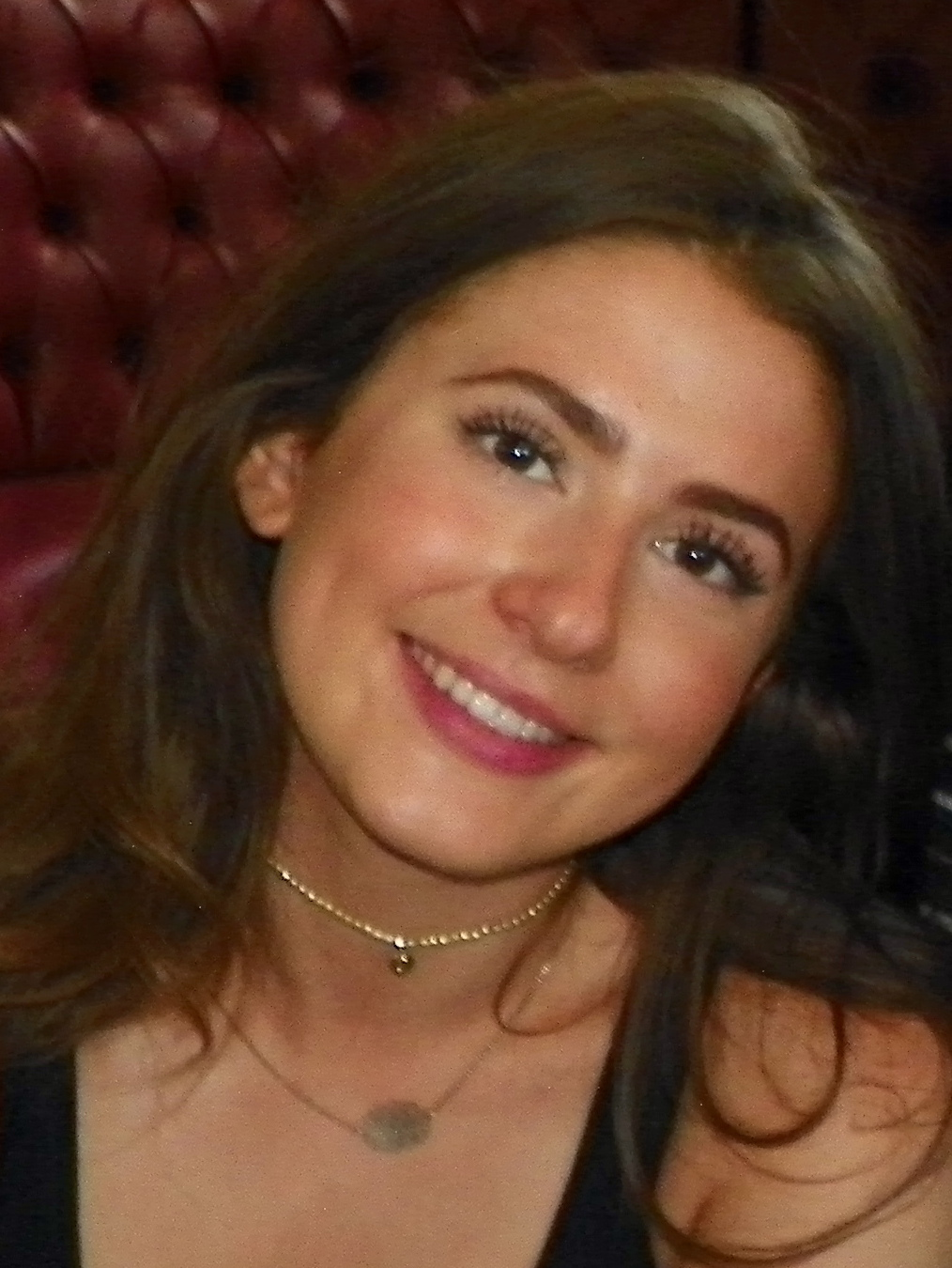
When Rebecca returned in 2014, the role was recast to actress Jasmine Armfield.

Bex, (now played by Jasmine Armfield), returned along with her mother Sonia (Natalie Cassidy) for a storyline involving Carol Jackson (Lindsay Coulson) being diagnosed with breast cancer. Bex made her return on 15 January 2014. Armfield's casting as Rebecca was announced in January 2014. Of her casting, Armfield's drama school principal, Teri Levett, said, "I'm so very proud of her. Jasmine is a really hardworking student. EastEnders is going to be fantastic for her and I'm really, really pleased." When Armfield auditioned for EastEnders, she was unaware of the character she would be playing and was "surprised" when she found out, saying of her casting, "My agent called and I couldn't believe it...it was amazing news".

=== Relationships and bullying ===
With the introduction of Shaheen Jafargholi as Shakil Kazemi, Tilly Keeper said, "there will probably be maybe a little bit of a love triangle and a lot of jealousy" between Louise and Bex. Keeper also added that Louise will show a "bit more of a manipulative side."

"I think nerves are a great thing because you really care about what you're doing, for me I really, truly do care about my job and love it and because it's such a big topic, bullying, I really did want to give it justice."

— Armfield on portraying a bullying storyline (2017)

A sexting plot began in December 2016, with Bex, Shakil and Louise as central characters. The storyline progressed into a revenge porn plot, following the aftermath of the bus crash Disaster Week. David Brown, from Radio Times, says the storyline "tackles a topic that should be of massive concern to both tech-savvy teenagers and parents who fear they're being left behind when it comes to the way their offspring communicate" and "that the fallout of these rash actions" could lead to legal consequences for Louise, Bex and Shakil. He also added that the show "is in a powerful position in that it can provide moral guidance to its younger viewers" and "has the potential to articulate the fears and worries of viewers who might not be able to express such concerns by themselves".

Bex enters a storyline where she is bullied by Madison Drake (Seraphina Beh) and Alexandra D'Costa (Sydney Craven). They are friends of Louise Mitchell (Tilly Keeper) who meet Bex through their mutual friend; they begin to taunt Bex for months. Louise also then starts bullying Bex and their friendship deteriorates. On one occasion, they are in a scene where Bex is brutally attacked in a school bathroom by the girls, and viewers were noted to be angry. Madison and Alexandra then also fall out with Louise after realising Louise still wishes to be friends with Bex and in the final showdown Louise is then pushed onto a tray of burning candles. Armfield had stated that her scenes in filming the bullying actually scare her. Fans later praised Armfield for her work in the storyline.

Keegan Baker (Zack Morris) and Shakil Kazemi (Shaheen Jafargholi) are stabbed in altercation with a gang over a stolen bike and Shakil dies as a result of his injuries.

=== Attempted suicide and 2020 departure ===
In spring 2019, Bex is struggling with her dependency on ADHD medication. After recovering from her addiction, she is then met with struggling to cope after being accepted by Oxford university and being rejected by former boyfriend Shakil's older brother Kush Kazemi (Davood Ghadami). She later runs away after being encouraged by Stuart Highway (Ricky Champ), but is then found. After managing to pull herself from the crowds of the Queen Vic, Lisa Fowler (Lucy Benjamin) notices the brave face being put on by Bex and encourages Bex to tell Sonia about how she is feeling as Lisa sees past her brave face and also has a history of poor mental health. Bex later doesn't and does attempt suicide: she is saved by Sonia and survives the ordeal.

On 28 January 2020, it was announced Armfield was set to depart from the soap in coming months. She departed on 6 March 2020 after deciding to have a gap year before attending Oxford university and travel the world.

=== 2025 return ===
In February 2025, following Martin's death in the 40th anniversary week of EastEnders, it was announced that Armfield would reprise her role as Bex for a short stint. A "devastated" Bex returns to Albert Square and "tries to adjust to everything that has happened", including Martin's death, Sonia being imprisoned for a crime Reiss Colwell (Jonny Freeman) committed and the birth of her half-sister, Julia. Of her return, executive producer Chris Clenshaw said: "We're delighted to welcome Jasmine home to EastEnders as part of Martin's farewell. There's no way that Bex would miss her dad's funeral, and Sonia needs her eldest daughter more than ever." He hinted that during her five-year absence on the soap, Bex had developed wisdom and experience and would return with a shift in personality. Armfield added: "It's wonderful to be back at EastEnders and to see so many familiar faces. It's amazing for me to come home, but for Bex, it's an absolutely devastating time because she's lost her dad. She's grown up a lot, having spent the past few years travelling, so we're going to see a much more mature and grown-up version of Bex this time around."

== Storylines ==
=== 2000–2007 ===
Sonia does not know that she is pregnant until she goes into labour and Mo Harris (Laila Morse) delivers the baby. After her daughter is born, Sonia is taken to hospital and tells her social worker Ameena Badawi (Shobna Gulati) upon meeting her that she does not want her baby. She names her baby Chloe and Sonia decides she wants Chloe adopted. Sonia hands Chloe over to Ameena, who takes Chloe into foster care. Martin and his mother, Pauline Fowler (Wendy Richard), discover Martin is the father, Pauline wants custody of Chloe, which Sonia is against. Martin agrees that he wants Chloe for Pauline's sake, but admits to his brother, Mark Fowler (Todd Carty), that he does not want to be a father and Chloe is adopted by Neil and Sue Miller (Sadie Shimmin). The Millers change Chloe's name to Rebecca. In 2002, Sonia, now suffering depression over the guilt of abandoning her daughter, kidnaps Rebecca and barricades herself inside her house. Neil and Sue (now Victoria Willing), understandably upset about Sonia's actions, give Dot Branning (June Brown) fifteen minutes to persuade Sonia to give Rebecca back before they phone the police. Dot successfully persuades Sonia to give Rebecca back.

In 2005, Neil and Sue are killed in a car crash and Rebecca moves in with Sue's mother, Margaret Wilson (Janet Amsden). Sonia reads about the crash in the newspaper and she and Martin, who are now married, are concerned for their daughter and decide to track her down to make sure she is well. Posing as friends of the Millers, Margaret allows the Fowlers into their home where they meet Rebecca (now Sharif). It is only when they admit who they really are that she tells them to leave. Pauline demands to be part of Rebecca's life, causing upset. Sonia is furious when she discovers Pauline and Martin have been seeing her daughter behind her back. Eventually Sonia gives into her urges and grows closer to Rebecca too. Margaret decides to make Sonia and Martin Rebecca's legal guardians in case anything happens to her, unaware that Sonia and Martin have separated due to Sonia's lesbian adultery. Sonia persuades Martin not to tell Margaret that they have split up, but when the truth comes out, Margaret is furious and refuses to give Sonia guardianship of Rebecca. When Margaret has a fall and dies, Rebecca is given to Martin and Pauline refuses Sonia access, causing many rows.

Sonia and Martin reunite in December 2006. On Christmas Day 2006, Pauline dies just before emigrating to America. Rebecca saw Sonia slap Pauline before her death and believes that Sonia killed Pauline. Sonia tries to hush Rebecca but the truth comes out and Sonia is arrested following a row with Martin. After absconding with Rebecca, Sonia is cleared of Pauline's murder when Joe Macer (Ray Brooks), Pauline's husband, admits to manslaughter. Sonia leaves Walford with Martin and Rebecca in February 2007.

=== 2014–2020 ===
Rebecca returned on 15 January 2014, now portrayed by Armfield, when her grandmother Carol Jackson (Lindsey Coulson) tells Sonia about her breast cancer diagnosis. Rebecca is seen in October 2014 when Sonia discovers that she has been missing school to practice her guitar for music school with Charlie Cotton (Declan Bennett). Having arranged for Rebecca to appear at The Queen Vic, Charlie calls Sonia. Rebecca performs a cover song of "You and I" by One Direction. In March 2015, Rebecca, tired of strife between her parents, enters a rebellious phase of her life. She adopts a goth fashion style and insists on being referred to by her former name, Chloe, before deciding to go by Bex. Bex rejects Sonia as she has been living away from them, and they become further estranged when Martin (now Bye) reveals Sonia is having a lesbian relationship with Tina Carter (Luisa Bradshaw-White). Martin, realising the situation may be his own fault, decides to have Bex live with Sonia, reasoning that she needs to spend more time with her mother.

Martin starts a relationship with Stacey Branning (Lacey Turner) and moves in with her and her daughter Lily (Aine Garvey). Martin plans to propose to Stacey and Bex gives him her blessing but is glad when they decide not to marry. Stacey gives birth to a son, Arthur Fowler, although unbeknownst to Martin, Arthur is not his son. When Stacey is diagnosed with and sectioned due to postpartum psychosis, Bex realises Martin is struggling with Arthur, Lily and work, so she draws him up a schedule. She accompanies Martin on a visit to the hospital to see Stacey. When Martin learns the truth about Arthur's paternity, he goes to stay with his sister Michelle Fowler (Susan Tully) in America and when he returns, he intends to leave for good. Martin then reveals that Kush Kazemi (Davood Ghadami) is Arthur's father to everyone in the pub, including Bex. Martin tells Bex that Arthur is still her brother, and Bex later explains to Stacey that she hurt her father. When Martin and Stacey get engaged, Martin tells Bex, who says that Arthur really is her brother now.

Bex takes Louise Mitchell (Tilly Keeper) to school on her first day and when Louise has a fight, Jay Brown (Jamie Borthwick) collects her and the girl she had a fight with turns out to be Jay's girlfriend, Linzi Bragg (Amy-Leigh Hickman). Bex and Louise tell Jay that Linzi is Bex's friend, Star, and is 14. Linzi gets upset when Jay is adamant things are over, and Bex comforts her. Bex tells Linzi's mother, Thelma Bragg (Lorraine Stanley) about the relationship, and points out Jay to her when she demands to know who has been having sex with Linzi. Although Jay has not had sex with Linzi, Bex states that Thelma's accusations are true. Jay is arrested and Bex is interviewed by police. After Bex tells Sonia that she has had sex, Sonia, Sharon Mitchell (Letitia Dean) and Honey Mitchell (Emma Barton), talk to her and Louise about the pressures and consequences of sex, but Bex reveals that she has not had sex. When Sonia finds a lump in her breast, she tells Bex, who fears that Sonia has cancer, but it turns out to be a cyst. Bex has a crush on newcomer Shakil Kazemi (Shaheen Jafargholi) and is jealous when Louise flirts with him. At Martin and Stacey's reception, Bex and Shakil kiss, seen by a jealous Louise. Martin struggles to accept Bex dating, and after disputes between Martin and Shakil, Sonia gets them to make amends for Bex's sake.

Tina's mother Sylvie Carter (Linda Marlowe), who has Alzheimer's disease, later moves in with Sonia and Tina, but Bex does not cope looking after her when Sonia and Tina are not around. Bex is stunned when Shakil tells her he wants to have sex with her. Bex tells him that she is not ready for sex and she talks about it with Louise, who tells her Shakil will not wait for long. After taking advice from Louise, Bex decides to change her appearance. Bex confides in Stacey about Shakil wanting to have sex, who mentions this to Martin; Martin interrupts Shakil's party, but later apologises to Bex.

Sonia is offered a job in Kettering and Martin and Stacey agree for Bex to live with them. Bex is angry and upset with Sonia and refuses to say goodbye, but Tina arranges for them to talk. Bex is upset and Shakil comforts her. Bex moves in with Martin and Stacey, but struggles to cope with the overcrowding until they move into Sonia's old house. When Bex discovers Shakil has bought condoms, she cancels her 16th birthday party to avoid him. Stacey advises Bex to tell Shakil how she feels. When the pair are alone in Bex's room, she stops him from going further than kissing, so he calls her frigid. However, Shakil apologises to Bex and she forgives him. Bex finds out from Louise and Shakil that people are talking about her relationship and about her and Shakil not having sex. Shakil suggests to Bex they send explicit photos of themselves to each other instead of sex. After talking with Louise and Tina, Bex decides to take an explicit photo. She tells Louise she has not sent the photo and thinks Shakil is not interested in her when he ignores her. Bex confronts Shakil about his ignoring her and Bex admits to Shakil that she did not want to break the law and feared the photos being shared, but apologises for hurting his feelings. Bex then tells Shakil she wants to have sex with him and they try to arrange a place and time that they can be alone. Bex goes round to Shakil's whilst his mother Carmel Kazemi (Bonnie Langford) and brother Kush are out and they have sex. Immediately afterwards, Shakil sees Bex and Louise talking and assumes Bex is telling Louise about it, so he ignores Bex and refuses to tell her if they are still together. Bex asks Stacey about sex and explains how Shakil is behaving towards her. Bex is upset when Shakil changes his online status to single. An upset Bex tells Stacey she has been dumped, who tells Martin and she is left embarrassed when Martin publicly has a go at Shakil.

Keegan Baker (Zack Morris) insults Bex and she finds out Shakil was one of the boys who teased Louise with Keegan and warns him to stay away from her. When the school closes early, Bex, Louise, Shakil and Keegan take a bus home, but the driver suffers a heart attack and drives through the market and into the viaduct. The students are trapped but escape through the emergency exit. Bex is upset to learn Martin is trapped under the bus, but everyone works together to get him out. Bex stops Louise from truanting after being teased over a video posted online by Keegan of the bus crash and Louise gets Bex to promise that she will not resume her relationship with Shakil. Convinced that Shakil is encouraging Keegan, Louise gets Bex's phone and sends Shakil's naked photo to her friends Alexandra D'Costa (Sydney Craven) and Madison Drake (Seraphina Beh) and Bex is left distressed when she finds out what Louise did and that the photo has been sent to another person. Bex remains angry with Louise, Madison and Alexandra for the way they have treated Shakil and is hurt when Shakil tells her she can "drop dead". On Valentine's Day, Bex receives a card and believes Shakil sent it, however, she realises Louise, Madison and Alexandra played a prank on her. Shakil tells Louise that he has seen Bex and Travis together and Madison and Alexandra tell Louise they believe Bex has been after Travis for a while, but when Louise confronts Bex, she insists they are just friends. Bex takes a liking to Preston Cooper (Martin Anzor), a student from the United States with whom her aunt Michelle (now played by Jenna Russell) had an illegal relationship. Preston encourages Bex to skip school and Preston gets Michelle to Sharon's house, where he is in bed with Bex, and Michelle realises Preston is using Bex to make her jealous. After finding out Bex had sex with Preston, Madison and Alexandra spread the fact, and Keegan and Shakil find out. Keegan suggests to Shakil they should get revenge on Bex, and Keegan imposes Bex's face on a porn video and spreads it around. Bex is humiliated when Martin sees the video. Bex and Martin meet with one of Bex's teachers, where Bex refuses to name anyone involved and they are told it is being passed onto the police as it is treated as an image of child abuse. Martin is called into school and is informed about Shakil's explicit photo. Bex takes the blame for sending it and she and Martin are told Bex will be interviewed under caution by the police the following day because she has distributed an indecent image of a child. Bex overhears Martin talking negatively about her to Stacey. When she tells Louise that she will admit the truth, Louise confesses that Madison and Alexandra were responsible for sending the photo and she should think about bringing them into it. Bex is cautioned and tells Louise, Madison and Alexandra she took the blame despite being the only innocent person, and they laugh at her. The police and social services visit Bex, Martin and Stacey to ask about explicit photos Bex took of herself. Although Bex thought she had deleted the photos and had not sent them on, they had been backed up automatically. Bex is told she can return to school, but when Martin returns her phone, she only receives abuse so decides to do an apprenticeship, which Martin disagrees with her doing. Kush persuades Bex to return to school and not let what is happening ruin her life. Madison and Alexandra overhear Bex insult them when she confronts Louise over their friendship. In the toilets, Madison and Alexandra push Bex, tear her shirt and write on her face whilst Louise stands outside, worried about Bex but feeling unable to help. She admits to teachers Mrs Robyn Lund (Polly Highton) and Mr Gethyn Price (Cerith Flinn) that Louise, Madison and Alexandra were responsible for her attack and sending the photo, but Louise, Madison and Alexandra deny knowledge of either incidents and Bex ends her friendship with Louise. When Preston returns from Manchester, he and Bex become a couple. Louise finds out that Michelle and Preston are having an affair so tells Bex, who later publicly demands to know if Michelle is having sex with her boyfriend. Preston admits he loves Michelle. While trying to find Preston, Michelle crashes a car into the chip shop after taking sleeping pills with alcohol. After this, Preston returns to America after being convinced that Michelle does not need him; Bex is glad that he has gone. Michelle tries to make amends with Bex, who reminds Michelle of what she has lost.

Alexandra and Madison continue bullying Bex and warn Bex that she can never escape them. They gain access to Bex's home by telling Stacey they are her friends and they smash her guitar. Bex is then tricked by them into putting mud covered in chocolate in her mouth, which the film and tell her it is cat faeces. Bex sees the video of this online and calls Sonia in tears, who returns to Walford and announces that she wants Bex to live with her. Sonia also visits Bex's school but does not mention Louise is part of the bullying when Bex asks her not to, which gives Louise hope that they can be friends again. After Michelle and Sharon get them talking, Louise agrees not to be friends with Alexandra and Madison, but in front of Bex she tells them she is not friends with Bex again, so Bex walks off in anger. Unknown to Louise, Madison and Alexandra plan to take revenge on her because they blame her for being reported to the school. Bex overhears Madison and Alexandra inviting Travis to a party at Louise's home, which Louise believes will just be for the three girls. Bex tries to warn Louise that they cannot be trusted but Louise accuses her of being jealous because she has no friends of her own. Travis leaves Louise's party and tells Bex that Louise needs her. After Louise gets drunk and is sick, she staggers outside, coughs up blood and collapses, panicking Bex, Madison, Alexandra, Keegan, Travis and Dennis, who are watching. Louise is taken to hospital with paralysis and Sharon tells Louise about Bex finding her. When Louise is sent home, she invites Bex round, but Madison and Alexandra turn up so Bex does not go to Louise's house. After speaking to Dennis about the party on Travis's behalf, Bex tells Louise that Alexandra followed Travis into the kitchen and Alexandra interrupts them. Alexandra gets herself out of trouble by telling Louise and Bex that Travis may not have been responsible for spiking her drink and Louise insists that Madison and Alexandra are still her friends. Bex hears a rumour that Louise had sex with Keegan at the party, so she tells her to take a pregnancy test, but Martin catches Bex purchasing the test for Louise and wrongly assumes it is for herself. Bex is delighted when she learns Stacey and Martin are having a baby.

Sonia returns from Kettering and wants Bex to move in with her and her brother, Robbie Jackson (Dean Gaffney) and Dot, however, Bex wants to remain with Martin and Stacey. Alexandra decides she will take revenge on Bex when she overhears Bex smugly telling Travis that Alexandra will mess up in the showcase. Before Bex's performance at the showcase, Madison and Alexandra break a guitar string and when Bex looks for one in a classroom, Madison and Alexandra pin Bex up against a wall. Shakil hears the bullying through headphones and exposes it through the soundboard. Bex is found locked in the cupboard and she is encouraged to perform following her ordeal. Bex and Louise make amends and Bex decides to go the prom with Shakil. At the prom, Louise suffers burns after being pushed onto lit candles by Alexandra and Madison, leading to their arrests. Bex visits Louise in hospital but her mother, Lisa Fowler (Lucy Benjamin), says Louise wants no visitors and Lisa tells Bex her plans for Louise if she was well. Louise is distressed when Lisa and Bex arrange for Travis to visit her. Bex receives her GCSE results and is disappointed that she gained a D in music, so Sonia contacts Gethin about Bex's result and Gethin agrees to tutor Bex. Following a gas explosion, Bex tends to Gethin's wounds and they kiss. Bex apologises but Gethin reassures her, however, he says he can no longer tutor her and says a relationship would be illegal due to the fact he is her teacher and insists he has no feelings for her. Bex attempts to make Gethin jealous by flirting with Shakil and Gethin asks her to stop her behaviour. When Bex claims to have a new boyfriend, Gethin starts tutoring her again. Bex continues to pursue him but he insists nothing can happen, and Louise asks Bex not to chase Gethin. However, Bex tries to get Gethin to admit he likes her, but he goes through with telling Sonia that Bex kissed him. Sonia is furious that the kiss happened weeks ago and throws Gethin out. She asks Bex for the whole truth and Bex insists it was just a kiss and asks Sonia not to report Gethin. Gethin gets drunk and Bex's great-uncle, Jack Branning (Scott Maslen), Gethin's landlord, evicts Gethin when he finds out about the kiss. Gethin then leaves Walford. Louise accidentally tells Shakil about Bex and Gethin, and Bex is heartbroken when Shakil kisses Louise, though Louise is stunned and disgusted by Shakil's immaturity. Bex is devastated when Shakil is stabbed and killed in a knife attack in May 2018.

The following year, overwhelmed by the prospect of going to Oxford, Bex takes drugs to cope with her exams and runs away; she is found by Stuart Highway (Ricky Champ). On the night of her leaving party, Bex writes a suicide note to her parents and attempts to overdose on pills. The following morning, Sonia finds her unresponsive in bed. She recovers well but decides to defer Oxford for a year, and once her life is back on track, she makes the decision to go travelling, which Sonia is unhappy about. However, she writes her mother a letter and successfully persuades her that she is doing the right thing. Martin and Sonia see her off at the Tube station.

=== 2025 ===
In February 2025, Sonia informs Bex over the phone that Martin has been killed in the Queen Vic explosion. Bex subsequently returns in April to say goodbye. She reunites with her mother and meets her half-sister, Julia, for the first time. Following Martin's funeral, Bex decides to stay in Walford for a few weeks. While still in Walford she notices Lily struggling and having stolen money from Kat Slater's (Jessie Wallace) cab office; she gives Lily the money to pay Kat back. Soon after the funeral, her estranged grandfather Terry Cant (Glen Davies) turns up offering for Sonia, Bex and Julia to join him living abroad. However, after Terry proves to be violent and obnoxious and Bex locks him in a garage, they leave with her aunt Bianca Jackson (Patsy Palmer) instead to start a new life in Bali.

== Reception ==
For her role as Bex, Armfield was nominated for Best Soap Actress at the 2017 TV Choice Awards. It is also notable that during Bex's bullying storyline, viewers had been to the point where they could no longer watch the bullying commence as they were noted to be "angry" at the pair of bullies Madison Drake (Seraphina Beh) and Alexandra D'Costa (Sydney Craven)'s characters. Armfield has also been praised for her work in Bex' storylines – her most notable praises from fans are for her work in her bullying storyline in 2017 and suicide storyline in 2019.
