= Sonia Fowler =

Fictional character from EastEnders

- EastEnders character
- Portrayed by: Natalie Cassidy
- Duration: 1993–2007, 2010–2011, 2014–2025
- First appearance: Episode 922; 2 December 1993
- Last appearance: Episode 7104; 17 April 2025
- Created by: Tony McHale
- Introduced by: Leonard Lewis (1993); Matthew Robinson (1998); Diederick Santer (2010); Bryan Kirkwood (2011); Dominic Treadwell-Collins (2014)
- Spin-off appearances: EastEnders: The Podcast (2019); The Queen Vic Quiz Night (2020)
In-universe information
- Other names: Sonia Jackson
- Occupation: Student; Café worker Nurse
- Family: Branning/Jackson/Fowler
- Father: Terry Cant
- Mother: Carol Jackson
- Stepfather: Alan Jackson
- Half-brothers: Robbie Jackson; Billie Jackson
- Half-sisters: Bianca Jackson
- Husband: Martin Fowler (2004–2006, 2007–2015)
- Daughters: Bex Fowler; Julia Fowler
- Grandfathers: Jim Branning
- Grandmothers: Reenie Branning; Eileen Cant
- Uncles: Derek Branning; Max Branning; Jack Branning
- Aunts: April Branning; Suzy Branning
- Nephews: Liam Butcher; Morgan Butcher; Sami Jackson
- Nieces: Tiffany Butcher; Whitney Dean (adoptive)
- First cousins: Joey Branning; Alice Branning; Bradley Branning; Lauren Branning; Abi Branning; Oscar Branning; Annie Carter; Penny Branning; Amy Mitchell; Ricky Branning; James Branning; Kevin; Rebecca
- Other relatives: Louie Beale; Charli Slater; Jimmy Beale

Sonia Fowler (also Jackson) is a fictional character from the BBC soap opera EastEnders, played by Natalie Cassidy. Her first appearance was on 2 December 1993 and she departed on 2 February 2007. She returned briefly in 2010 along with other members of the Jackson family, and re-appeared in the soap from 8 to 18 February 2010 and again in January 2011. Sonia returned as a permanent character on 14 January 2014, as part of a storyline that saw her mother Carol Jackson (Lindsey Coulson) develop breast cancer. Cassidy took maternity leave in 2016 and Sonia left on 20 September 2016 for her dream job in Kettering. Cassidy made two guest stints during her maternity leave, on 25 December 2016 via webcam and for a three episode arc from 14 to 18 April 2017. She returned full-time on 27 June 2017. On 29 December 2020, it was announced that Cassidy would take an extended break from the show, with Sonia set to leave the Square to return in spring 2021. She departed on 8 January and returned on 16 April. In 2024, Cassidy took another break from the serial, with Sonia departing on 22 August 2024 and returning on 13 January 2025. The same month, on 30 January, it was announced that Cassidy had quit the role once again; she departed on 17 April of the same year.

Sonia has been featured in storylines including affairs, feuds, bereavements, family problems, teenage pregnancy and a cancer scare. In 2000, Sonia discovers that she is pregnant at 15 and gives birth to a daughter, Bex Fowler (Jasmine Armfield), whom she puts up for adoption. She begins a relationship with Jamie Mitchell (Jack Ryder) who is later killed on Christmas Day 2002. Sonia is better known for her problematic marriage with Bex's father Martin Fowler (James Alexandrou/James Bye), which ends in 2006 when Sonia begins an affair with Naomi Julien (Petra Letang). The pair eventually reconcile for Bex; however, Sonia develops a feud with Martin's mother, Pauline Fowler (Wendy Richard), which ends when Pauline is murdered. Sonia is originally arrested for her murder, but it transpires that Pauline's husband, Joe Macer (Ray Brooks), is her killer.

Since her return in 2014, Sonia's storyline has included divorcing Martin, coming out as bisexual, a cancer scare, an on-off feud with Martin's wife Stacey Slater (Lacey Turner), relationships with Tina Carter (Luisa Bradshaw-White) and Bex's teacher Gethin Pryce (Cerith Flinn), supporting Bex through her attempted suicide, briefly reconciling with Martin and stealing money from Dot Cotton (June Brown) to help pay off Martin's hit-and-run victim who had been blackmailing her. In 2021, Sonia is led to believe that she has reunited with her father Terry, whom she never knew. However, this is revealed to be a lie as the man posing as her father is actually Tom "Rocky" Cotton (Brian Conley) intending to scam her. Sonia later enters into a relationship with Dot's great-nephew Reiss Colwell (Jonny Freeman) who she discovers is married, but they decide to try for a baby via IVF. Later, Sonia is wrongly charged with the murder of Reiss' comatose wife, Debbie Colwell (Jenny Meier) but she is unaware that the culprit is actually Reiss. This, combined with Martin's death during the 40th anniversary and finally meeting her real father, Terry Cant (Glen Davies), results in her second departure from the show, choosing to go travelling with Bianca and Bex.

== Creation ==
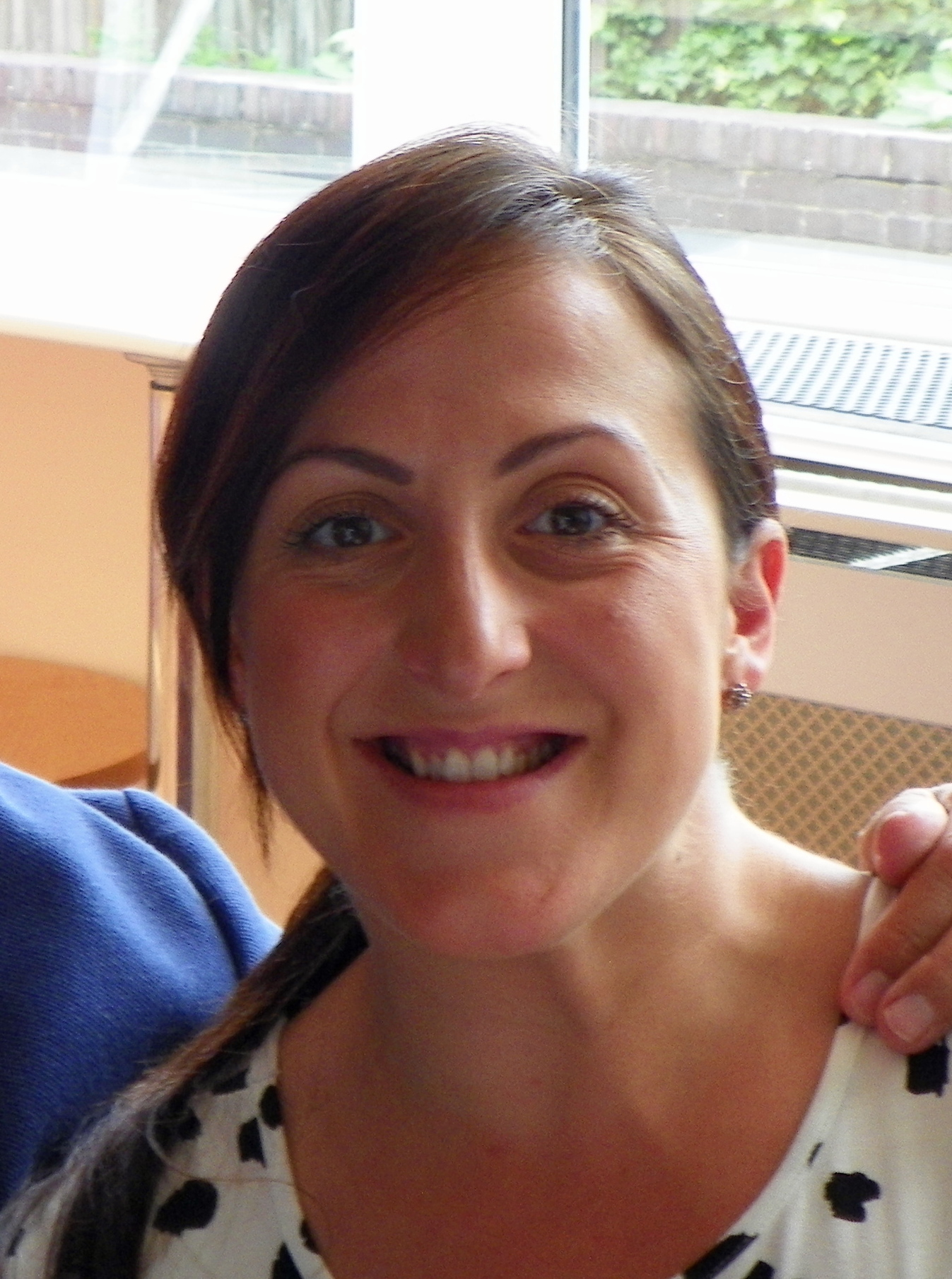
Natalie Cassidy (pictured) was cast as Sonia in 1993.

1994 was a "historic" year for EastEnders, as in April, a third weekly episode was introduced. Due to the programme's increased frequency, a number of new characters were introduced to the regular cast in the latter part of 1993 and early 1994. Among them were the Jackson family: mother Carol (Lindsey Coulson), her four children, Bianca (Patsy Palmer), Robbie (Dean Gaffney), Sonia (Natalie Cassidy), and Billie (Devon Anderson), as well as Carol's partner Alan Jackson (Howard Antony). Though Carol and Alan were not initially married in the serial, and though Alan was only the biological father of Billie, the whole family took on Alan's surname. The family was created by writer Tony McHale.

Various members of the family began to appear sporadically from November 1993 onwards, but in episodes that aired early in 1994, the Jacksons moved from Walford Towers, a block of flats, to the soap's focal setting of Albert Square. Their slow introduction was a deliberate attempt by the programme makers to introduce the whole family over a long period. The Jacksons have been described by EastEnders scriptwriter Colin Brake as a "classic problem family".

Cassidy was 10 years old when she joined the soap as Sonia. She was spotted doing improvisations at the Anna Scher Theatre School by Tony McHale and EastEnders' Casting Advisor Jane Deitch. They liked Cassidy and she was asked to audition at Elstree studios, after which she was offered the part. None of the actors cast as the Jackson family were matched for appearance or screen compatibility. Cassidy commented, "it was all decided without doing that. I don't think it particularly mattered that none of us Jackson kids looked like each other because all our characters had different dads!"

== Development ==
Early on in the character's narrative, Sonia was given a trumpet to play, which she did badly, infuriating her family and neighbours. According to Cassidy, this was on the behest of Storyliner and future Executive Producer of EastEnders, John Yorke. Cassidy revealed that she took lessons to play the trumpet, but that when she began to play well, she was asked by the producers to pretend to play it badly as Sonia was supposed to be playing it badly. Other storylines included a period where Sonia was bullied by her friend Clare Bates (Gemma Bissix) after she fell in with the wrong crowd at school. Despite the bullying storyline, Cassidy said that she and Bissix were good friends during their time together on the soap.

In 1997, the actress who played Sonia's mother Carol decided to quit EastEnders. It was at this stage that the producers made a decision to write the majority of the Jackson family out. Cassidy commented, "I thought I was out of a job [on EastEnders] forever!". Cassidy made several temporary returns on-screen months later to visit Clare or Bianca, but she was still uncertain about the future of her character: "I didn't come back to the show for about four months or so after [ I was written out in 1997]. And after Clare left the Square [in 1998] I was gone for another eight months. I just got on with school and all that". However, later in 1998 the producers asked Cassidy to return to the serial full-time, which she said she was "thrilled" about.

=== Departure (2007) ===
In April 2006, it was announced that Cassidy would take a break from EastEnders, saying "it's time to try new things. But it doesn't mean Sonia won't be back". A BBC spokesperson added, "Natalie is a valued member of the EastEnders cast and we wish her all the very best during her break from the show". Sonia departed on screen in February 2007, along with her former husband, Martin Fowler, as his actor, James Alexandrou, also left the serial. Their departing storyline was the culmination of the death of Pauline Fowler, following actress Wendy Richard's high-profile resignation from the serial in 2006. In the storyline, Pauline dies in suspicious circumstances and Sonia is blamed for killing her, although Sonia is eventually vindicated when Pauline's husband Joe Macer (Ray Brooks) admits to manslaughter. Sonia and Martin and their daughter Rebecca leave Walford as a united family for the United States. In 2010, Cassidy said one of the reasons she decided to leave the show was because of Sonia's affair with Naomi Julien (Petra Letang), saying it was wrong for the character.

Despite Cassidy's departure being specified as a "break", Cassidy commented in 2008, "I feel that door's closed now and I need to go and do other stuff [...] Maybe in nine years I might go back." More recently, in 2009, press reports suggested that the actress was keen to reprise the role. Patsy Palmer, who returned to EastEnders as Sonia's sister Bianca, publicly called for the actress's return: "I would love her to come back. I mean, she is family! I've told bosses that it's a good time, when you think about it, as the Jacksons are back now as well."

=== Guest stints (2010–2011) ===
On 25 October 2009 it was announced that Cassidy would return to the soap to reprise her role as Sonia, along with Coulson, Gaffney and Anderson. The characters would reunite with Bianca who returned in 2008. Cassidy is quoted as saying "To be invited back to EastEnders is such an honour and I am very, very excited that Sonia is coming back. For me, to be reunited with the original Jacksons is a dream come true and I think it will be a fantastic storyline." A source told entertainment website Digital Spy: "Everything's being kept hush-hush about the Jacksons' return at the moment, but there are certainly a load of questions to be answered. Will the frosty relationship between Carol and Bianca thaw? Are Sonia and Martin still together? And how will Robbie react when he learns of his beloved Wellard's death? Everyone's so pleased to have them back." The family returned for Bianca's second wedding to Ricky Butcher (Sid Owen) as part of the show's 25th anniversary. Executive producer Diederick Santer explained that he wanted great stories to get people talking, saying "The wedding is the perfect opportunity for us to bring back the much-loved Jackson characters – Carol, Sonia, Robbie and Billie." In December 2010, it was announced Cassidy would return to EastEnders, as Sonia in order to facilitate a temporary storyline departure for co-star Palmer, who was due to take maternity leave. Sonia's one-off return was broadcast on 21 January 2011.

=== Reintroduction (2014) ===
Sonia returned permanently on 14 January 2014.

In February 2016, Cassidy announced she was expecting her second child, meaning she would be taking maternity leave. Cassidy confirmed the baby is due in "summer" 2016. It was expected that Cassidy would leave in spring 2016, with Sonia departing on-screen in summer 2016. Sonia departed on-screen on 20 September 2016. After returning for a short stint from 14 April 2017 to 18 April 2017, Cassidy returned to the role of Sonia permanently, with the return being broadcast on 27 June 2017.

=== Second departure (2025) ===
In January 2025, after returning from a break earlier in the month, it was announced on 30 January that Cassidy had decided to leave the soap again, with her departure set to air later in the year. Speaking of her decision, Cassidy said in a statement that "After another 11 solid years back on The Square, [she had] decided [it was] time to move on to pastures new. [...] adding that EastEnders is in [her] bones so [she would] never forget where [she] started [her] career and that she would continue to love the show".

== Storylines ==
=== 1993–2007 ===
Sonia and her family move to Albert Square. She is the third of Carol Jackson's four children and the result of her mother's relationship with Terry Cant (Glen Davies), whom Sonia never knew and who was violent towards Carol. During her childhood, she becomes close friends with Clare Tyler and the two are inseparable until Clare falls in with the wrong crowd at school and starts bullying Sonia but they reconcile before Clare leaves in 1998. Sonia has sex with Martin Fowler but starts dating Jamie Mitchell (Jack Ryder). Not knowing she is pregnant, Sonia goes into labour and gives birth to Martin's daughter. The baby, who is named Chloe, is subsequently given up for adoption and renamed Rebecca, despite protests from Martin's mother Pauline Fowler (Wendy Richard). However, Sonia becomes obsessed with her daughter and abducts her, locking herself in her house with the baby. Despite pleas from Rebecca's adoptive parents, it is Sonia's step-grandmother, Dot Branning (June Brown), who persuades Sonia to return the baby.

Sonia and Jamie get engaged, but due to Jamie's fling with Zoe Slater (Michelle Ryan) and constant rowing, the relationship ends. Sonia dates Gus Smith (Mohammed George), who plans to propose, but he is devastated when Sonia reconciles with Jamie after he is brutally assaulted by his godfather, Phil Mitchell (Steve McFadden). Sonia helps him, nursing him through his injuries and they decide to marry but their happiness is short-lived as Martin accidentally hits Jamie with his vehicle. Sonia keeps a bedside vigil and is with Jamie when he dies.

Sonia eventually forgives Martin and as they grow closer, they fall in love and eventually elope. Sonia begins nursing training and she and Martin live with Pauline but struggle to cope with her interference. Martin gets unwittingly involved with a stalker, Sarah Cairns (Alison Pargeter), who tries to ruin his marriage. This culminates in Sarah holding Sonia and Martin hostage and stabbing Martin, until Sonia knocks her unconscious. Sonia and Martin face further upset when they discover that their daughter's adoptive parents have died in a car crash. They visit Rebecca's (Jade Sharif) guardian, Margaret Wilson (Janet Amsden), hiding their true identity but when Margaret realises who they are, she asks them to leave. Pauline also interferes and visits Rebecca with Martin. Sonia is furious when she learns this and animosity in the Fowlers' home puts a strain on Martin and Sonia's relationship so she spends her time with a colleague, Naomi Julien; feelings develop and they begin an affair. Martin is heartbroken when his marriage ends and the situation is complicated further by Rebecca, who, on Margaret's request, is spending more time at the Fowlers'. Margaret decides to make the Fowlers' Rebecca's legal guardians but does not include Sonia when she finds out about her lesbian fling. Margaret dies and Martin takes custody of Rebecca and Pauline tries to stop Sonia having any contact with Rebecca. This makes Sonia distraught and preoccupied with Rebecca. Feeling neglected, Naomi ends their relationship.

Sonia becomes depressed and begins to neglect her work and drink heavily, until Gus helps her straighten her life out. Sonia and Gus begin a second romance, which ends due to Sonia's lingering feelings for Martin. Sonia and Martin receive their divorce papers. However, both regret getting divorced and they reconcile. Pauline eventually finds out and tells Martin that she is dying from a brain tumour to stop him moving in with Sonia. Just as Pauline intends, Martin ends his relationship with Sonia in order to care for her, but when the truth finally comes out, a furious Martin moves out anyway. Pauline responds with ire, threatening to cut her son from her life. Sonia tries to build bridges with Pauline but an argument ends with Sonia slapping Pauline. When Pauline is found dead later that day, Sonia fears that she caused her death. She discovers that Rebecca witnessed the slap and tries to silence her daughter, but Rebecca tells Dot at Pauline's funeral. Appalled, Martin refuses Sonia access to Rebecca. Fearing imprisonment, Sonia abducts Rebecca and goes on the run. Martin is frantic, but days later Sonia returns and she is arrested on a murder charge; however, that same night Dot uncovers the identity of Pauline's real murderer – Pauline's husband Joe Macer (Ray Brooks), who had argued with Pauline on Christmas Day and struck her over the head, causing her death. Sonia is released and decides to leave Walford for Manchester. After making peace with Martin, she takes a taxi and is about to leave Walford when she sees Martin and Rebecca obstructing the road; Martin has decided that he wants to go with Sonia. The Fowlers reunite and leave as a family. They remarry and spend time touring the United States before settling in Manchester.

=== 2010–2011 ===
Bianca invites Sonia and Martin to her wedding to Ricky Butcher and Sonia attends alone. She rejects a phone call from Martin and gets very drunk. The following day, Sonia walks in on Dot slapping her granddaughter Dotty Cotton (Molly Conlin) across the legs, leading to Dot's arrest, though she is released without charge. Bianca notices Sonia has continuously avoided talking about Martin and Rebecca. Sonia visits Jamie's grave and later returns to The Queen Victoria pub, and drunkenly berates Phil, Jamie's godfather, about his treatment of Jamie. Phil says he considers Jamie to be one of his own children and tells Sonia to go upstairs to sober up. She misunderstands him and gets into his bed, naked. As Phil sees Sonia in bed, Shirley Carter (Linda Henry) walks in and slaps Phil across the face. Sonia confides in Carol about her marriage problems and Carol advises her to try to stay together for Rebecca's sake. After Ricky and Bianca's wedding, Sonia decides she must make a fresh start with Martin and leaves again. Sonia returns in January 2011, following Bianca's disappearance following her attack on Connor Stanley (Arinze Kene), who had also dating Whitney. She reveals to Ricky and Carol that Bianca has been hiding out with her at a B&B and is not in a good way. Ricky suggests getting Bianca out of the country but Sonia tells him she that Bianca has decided to give herself up. During a conversation with Carol, Sonia reveals she and Martin are no longer together and she and Rebecca are back living in London while Martin remains in Manchester. Carol is surprised but Sonia tells her the split occurred around the time of Billie's death and did not want to burden her with her problems. After Bianca hands herself in, Sonia leaves again.

=== 2014–2025 ===
In January 2014, Carol informs Sonia, who is having marital problems with Martin again, about her breast cancer diagnosis. Carol has the BRCA gene and Sonia finds out she has inherited it. Sonia kisses Tina Carter (Luisa Bradshaw-White), which Tina's girlfriend, Fiona "Tosh" Mackintosh (Rebecca Scroggs), finds out about, so Tina end her friendship with Sonia to protect her relationship. Sonia, who has started a weight loss class, arranges to have a gastric band in Bulgaria, telling friends and family she is on a course. When she returns, she tries to confess to her class but collapses before she can do so. Sonia and Martin (now played by James Bye) separate and Sonia starts to feel isolated and depressed. Sonia is supported by Tina but Sonia backs away when Tina goes to kiss her as Sonia is unsure of her feelings. Martin moves back to Walford and Rebecca (now played by Jasmine Armfield) moves in with him, as she resents Sonia for leaving Martin. Martin believes he can repair his marriage, but Tina and Sonia share a kiss, which Martin sees. He tells everyone in The Queen Vic about Sonia and Tina, and Sonia ends their relationship. Martin sends Rebecca, who now wants to be called Bex, to live with Sonia so she can spend more time with her mother, whilst Sonia also repairs her relationship with Tina. Martin begins dating Stacey Slater (Lacey Turner), and Sonia also decides to move on by embarking on a full relationship with Tina. Sonia and Martin's divorce is later finalised and he marries Stacey, with Sonia giving her blessing. After Tina drunkenly humiliates Sonia at an awards ceremony and Sonia rejects her, Tina has sex with Sophie Dodd (Poppy Rush) and regrets it, but before she can tell Sonia, Sonia reveals she has found a lump in her breast. Sonia forgives Tina for the humiliation, but Sophie tells Sonia that Tina cheated and their relationship ends, but they soon reunite. After having her breast lump checked, Sonia is given the all-clear. Sonia supports Tina by looking after her ailing mother Sylvie Carter (Linda Marlowe) and ends up becoming her full-time carer.

In September 2016, Sonia receives a lucrative job offer at a private hospital in Kettering and, having realised she no longer loves Tina, ends their relationship. Bex is initially furious and thinks that Sonia is abandoning her, but later calms down and she says an emotional farewell. During Sonia's absence, Bex is bullied by Madison Drake (Seraphina Beh), Alexandra D'Costa (Sydney Craven) and her former friend Louise Mitchell (Tilly Keeper). Bex breaks down and calls Sonia, prompting her to return, and she accuses Martin and Stacey of not looking after Bex. Sonia decides to take Bex with her along to Kettering and she meets with Bex's headteacher at Walford High in order to report Madison and Alexandra's actions, but Sonia decides not to mention Louise's involvement at Bex's request. When she realises that Bex is happy staying with Martin and Stacey, Sonia returns to Kettering. Later Sonia returns to Walford and lets herself into Dot's house, finding Dot on the floor after tripping. Sonia and Robbie, who has also returned, move in with Dot to help care for her. It is revealed that Sonia is hiding a secret from her time in Kettering as she no longer chooses to return there. Although Sonia wants Bex to move in with them, Bex chooses to stay with Martin and Stacey. Mr Waters (Andrew Bone), the son of one of Sonia's former patients in Kettering arrives in Walford and accuses Sonia of fleecing his late mother out of her money. Sonia reveals that she had been nursing her and inherited everything in her will, but nobody believes her and Bex assumes that she has run away from Kettering. Bex's teacher Gethin Pryce (Cerith Flinn) defends Sonia and orders Mr Waters to leave. Sonia starts dating Gethin but is unaware that Bex is infatuated with him. Bex and Gethin kiss and after Bex attempts to pursue him, he eventually confesses the truth to Sonia. Gethin subsequently resigns his job at the school and leaves Walford.

In December 2017, Sonia discovers Kim Fox-Hubbard (Tameka Empson) having a miscarriage and supports her. Martin and Stacey's marriage is fractured when Stacey sleeps with Sonia's uncle, Max Branning (Jake Wood). Stacey kicks Martin out and Sonia agrees for him to move into No. 25 with her and Bex. Sonia discovers that she may still be in love Martin and agrees to go on a date with him. However, Martin still has feelings for Stacey, which upsets Sonia. When Bex decides that she doesn't want to go to university, Sonia pressures Bex into applying to Oxbridge University, much to Bex's annoyance. Bex tells Sonia that she is feeling upset since her boyfriend Shakil Kazemi (Shaheen Jafargholi) was killed and that she isn't ready for university, and Sonia supports Bex's decision. Sonia and Dot care for Harold Legg (Leonard Fenton) when he becomes ill and he moves into No.25. A swastika is graffitied on Dot's door which causes Dr Legg to fall into a panic attack. Sonia blames Dot's new lodger, Stuart Highway (Ricky Champ) for the attack and threatens to report him to the police if he comes anywhere near No. 25. However, Stuart is innocent and the perpetrators behind the attack are young youths. Sonia's niece Tiffany Butcher (Maisie Smith) is involved in a drug ring gang and Sonia discovers this when Tiffany's friend, Bernadette Taylor (Clair Norris) informs her. Sonia and the Brannings try to help Tiffany and promise to pay off the drug dealers that Tiffany and her friend, Evie Steele (Sophia Capasso) owe money to, to stop Tiffany from running away. Tiffany discovers that Sonia is lying and attempts to leave, but Sonia stops her from leaving causing Tiffany to slap her. She locks Tiffany in Dot's from and finally releases her when she agrees to speak up about the drug ring.

When Bex takes an overdose, Sonia finds her and is dismayed when she realises that it was a suicide attempt. She blames herself, and when Martin returns to Walford, Sonia is angry with him for being absent. She is forced to give him a false alibi when police question him about stolen vehicles and she convinces him to tell the truth. She forgives him but Martin's behaviour continues and he is injured during an attack so Sonia throws him out. She forgives him again and realises that she still has feelings for him. When Martin and Charlie "Tubbs" Savage (Tayla Kovacevic-Ebong) knock down George Watson (Jack Bennett), Sonia visits George in hospital to question him about the hit-and-run. Upon realising Sonia and Martin are in a relationship, George blackmails Sonia and threatens to report Martin to the police unless she gives him £10,000. Sonia steals the money from Dot's bank account. Sonia is guilty but Martin decides to take the blame. Dot throws him out and leaves Walford to live with her grandson, Charlie Cotton (Declan Bennett) and his wife Liz (Michelle Connolly) in Ireland.

In June 2020, Sonia decides she wants to get in touch with her birth father, Terry Cant. However, the subsequent COVID-19 lockdown means that she is busy at the hospital, which leaves Sonia stressed and exhausted. When Ian Beale (Adam Woodyatt) makes light of the pandemic, Sonia snaps at him and decides to visit her family abroad. During her 36th birthday, Sonia meets Tom "Rocky" Cotton (Brian Conley) who is impersonating her father, Terry. He tells her that he loved Carol but Sonia is unwilling to build bridges due to Terry's abusive treatment of Carol when they were together and she sends him away. Rocky returns and decides to stay to establish a relationship with Sonia, and they eventually bond. Unknown to Sonia, Rocky's real name is Thomas Cotton, and he is working with his niece, Dotty (now Milly Zero), to con Sonia who is in control of Dotty's inheritance since Sonia has power of attorney. Rocky later reveals the truth and Sonia rejects him, although she forms a friendship with Rocky's partner, Kathy Beale (Gillian Taylforth). Sonia allows Janine Butcher (Charlie Brooks) to live with her and supports her when Social Services investigate Janine as a mother to her daughter, Scarlett (Tabitha Byron). Janine is suspicious that her boyfriend, Mick Carter (Danny Dyer) is cheating with his ex-wife, Linda (Kellie Bright), and Sonia investigates Mick's behavior and initially assures Janine that Mick loves her until she sees him embrace Linda. Janine lies to Mick that she is having complications with her pregnancy after a fall at the Tube Station in order to push him away from Linda, but Sonia encourages Janine to be honest with Mick, causing Janine to threaten her. Out of concern for Janine, Sonia calls her former brother-in-law (and Janine's brother) Ricky back to Walford.

In December 2022, Sonia receives a phone call from Charlie with the news that Dot has died. As Charlie is ill, Sonia arranges Dot's funeral with the support of local residents and she contacts some of Dot's old friends who return to pay their respects at the funeral. She becomes close to Dot's relative, Reiss Colwell (Jonny Freeman) and they sleep together after the wake. Sonia discovers that she has inherited the majority of Dot's estate, including her house, much to her disbelief and Dotty's anger, which results in Dotty leaving Walford. Sonia spends Christmas Day with Janine, Ricky, and the Carters at The Queen Vic, and is shocked when Scarlett reveals that Janine had framed Linda for a car crash, and Jada Lennox (Kelsey Calladine-Smith) also reveals that Janine had paid her to plant wine bottles in Linda's bag and call social services to take her children. Janine decides to flee when Mick calls the police and she abandons Scarlett with Sonia and Ricky. After Mick is presumed dead from drowning in the sea during a car chase with Janine and Linda, Janine returns and tries to manipulate Scarlett into retracting her statement but Ricky reports her to the police leading to her arrest. He soon returns to Germany with Scarlett, leaving Sonia alone. She decides to invite Reiss to live with her and they begin a relationship. Sonia discovers that Rocky is still married to his first wife, Jo Cotton (Vicki Michelle), and she forces Rocky to tell Kathy. However, Sonia is unaware that Reiss is married to Debbie Colwell (Jenny Meier), as he hides this from Sonia. Ironically, Rocky overhears Reiss talking about his wife and also forces Reiss to admit this to Sonia. Sonia proceeds to evict Reiss and he reveals that his wife is in hospital after having a stroke that has left her unresponsive. Sonia follows Reiss to visit Debbie in hospital but Sonia cannot forgive Reiss for lying to her; she realises that she loves him and they reconcile.

In August 2023, Sonia worries she is pregnant and is convinced by Bianca's stepdaughter, Whitney, to take a pregnancy test. Sonia is reluctant, as Reiss has stated he does not want children, but the test is negative. Reiss discovers the test and, believing he cannot be the father, assumes Sonia has been having an affair with Whitney's boyfriend, Zack Hudson (James Farrar). Reiss reveals he has a low sperm count and cannot have children naturally, having previously tried IVF with Debbie before her stroke. He then asks Sonia to have his child via IVF, and she agrees. Despite initial struggles to conceive, Sonia becomes pregnant but later discovers she has suffered a blighted ovum. Sonia learns Reiss has been using Debbie's money to fund their IVF treatment. Against her sister Bianca's wishes, Sonia does not break up with Reiss, and they agree to continue using Debbie's money since Reiss has legal control of her finances. In July 2024, Sonia finds out she is pregnant again, but her joy is short-lived when Reiss reveals they are penniless due to Debbie's care home expenses. Amidst worsening money problems, Reiss later murders Debbie to avoid paying for her expenses, but he hides this from Sonia. Debbie's parents Hugh (Michael Bertenshaw) and Brenda Collins (Nichola McAuliffe) arrive in Walford, and Brenda is horrified when she overhears Sharon Watts (Letitia Dean) and Teddy Mitchell (Roland Manookian) discussing Reiss's use of Debbie's money for IVF treatment with Sonia. Brenda confronts Reiss and reveals to Sonia that she had put her own money into Debbie's account, so Reiss had stolen from her. Sonia clashes with her family and friends when they try to warn her about Reiss, and she decides to sell Dot's house, so that she and Reiss can leave Walford, but changes her mind. Sonia discovers that Reiss had tried to fleece Sharon and Phil with an investment scam, and does not have money to repay them. During their engagement party, Sonia and Reiss are arrested for Debbie's murder. Sonia is charged with Debbie's murder and remanded in custody. Martin later reveals that Sonia has been moved into a mother and baby unit.

Sonia's trial begins in January 2025. Reiss attempts to prevent one of the nursing home staff from testifying against Sonia, but to no avail. After collapsing during the nurse's testimony, Sonia decides to change her plea to protect the baby from the added stress. To prevent this, Bianca, who, unbeknownst to anyone, is being held hostage by Reiss after discovering the truth of Debbie's murder, records a false confession to clear Sonia's name under the condition Reiss releases her; the video ultimately leads to Sonia's acquittal. Upon returning home, Reiss attempts to convince Sonia that Bianca truly murdered Debbie, despite her belief Bianca falsely confessed in order to collapse the trial; she eventually believes Reiss after Jack shows her the confession video. After suffering a premature rupture when being confronted by her cousin Lauren Branning (Jacqueline Jossa) over the video, Sonia decides to delete the video but is horrified to realise that a dollhouse Reiss has brought home is featured in the video, implicating Reiss in the false confession; Reiss then confesses to murdering Debbie and kidnapping Bianca. Sonia tries to flee but is prevented by Reiss, just as an escaped Bianca arrives and knocks Reiss out by attacking him with a teapot. Sonia and Bianca flee to Jack to inform him of Reiss' crimes, though are horrified to discover that Reiss has fled when they return to the house.

In the aftermath of Reiss' escape, Sonia supports a heavily-traumatised Bianca and encourages her to attend the wedding of Billy (Perry Fenwick) and Honey Mitchell (Emma Barton), during which Reiss returns and crashes his car into the Queen Vic, causing an explosion which traps Sonia and Lauren inside the pub's kitchen, during which Sonia goes into labour. Bianca enters the pub's wreckage to rescue the pair, but the group are confronted by Reiss who refuses to let them out; an ensuing fight results in Reiss being crushed to death by falling debris. Lauren and Bianca ultimately deliver Sonia's baby Julia inside the pub. Sonia is then devastated to learn of Martin's death in the same disaster. A few weeks later, she attends Martin's funeral and manages to provide emotional support for Stacey, although Sonia gets drunk to forget her grief. The next day, Kim lets slip that Bianca did a podcast about Reiss imprisoning her, before Bianca is able to update Sonia. The real Terry Cant tracks Sonia down after learning of her ordeal via a True Crime Podcast and offers her, Bex and Julia a fresh start with a trip to Bali, but he soon proves himself to be violent and obnoxious as Carol had described him years earlier, ending with Bex locking him in a garage. Most of the Square turn out to say farewell to them. Following a last goodbye to Martin, Sonia and her two daughters depart Walford one last time, with Bianca taking Terry's place and Sonia jokingly playing her trumpet as they drive away.

== Reception ==
Natalie Cassidy won the award for "Best Actress" for the role of Sonia, at the 2001 British Soap Awards. Additionally, in 2004, Cassidy was awarded "best dramatic performance by a young actor or actress" for the role.

Referencing Sonia's foray into lesbianism in 2005, TV critic Grace Dent branded the character "the worst lesbian ever", adding, "The only lesbians with less lesbian tendencies than you are the women on the front cover of the Horny Triple-X Lesbian Specials which they keep at eye level by the sweets in my corner shop. Time to make a u-turn."

Lesbian website AfterEllen.com was also critical of the storyline that saw Sonia experimenting with her sexuality and then returning to her heterosexual orientation shortly after. Sharon Hadrian writes:

It was the first time in over a decade that a lesbian couple had been depicted in the East London drama, lending cautious optimism to the idea that the BBC was finally integrating its traditionally heterosexual soaps [...] Lesbian fans, meanwhile, are struggling to care at all after being led on by the show's failed attempts at writing a decent lesbian story line [...] Despite their troubles, Martin and Sonia got married in 2004 and – given their past – many fans believe they are meant to be together. If this seems like the most inopportune time to turn Sonia into a lesbian, well, the show's writers did it anyway [...] Sonia's sudden lesbian affair was met with disapproval from all sides, and nobody – the fans, characters or even the actors – was particularly supportive of her relationship. As a result, perhaps, the writers wrote what was expected of them [...] there was hardly room in the script for any affection or sympathy at all; instead, their relationship was written around its impact on Martin and the other Albert Square residents. The reaction of Rebecca's guardian, Margaret, was especially hurtful. When the [lesbian] relationship became public, she immediately sought to award sole custody of Rebecca to Martin, citing Sonia's sexual orientation as the reason she would be an unfit mother. This vitriolic response to Sonia and Naomi's relationship could have been a pivotal moment had the program's producers used the opportunity to prove either the quality of their relationship or to reinforce Sonia's parenting abilities. Unfortunately, they did neither of these things. Instead, Margaret's reaction was surprisingly representative of the public response to their relationship. Fans of the show were upset that anyone (let alone a lesbian) had come between Sonia and Martin. Naomi came off looking especially predatory – a common trait in media representations of gay and lesbian characters – by seducing a formerly heterosexual woman and convincing her to leave her family [...] not too surprisingly, Naomi and Sonia broke up. Afterward, Naomi faded into the background and Sonia ended up back with Martin, seeming to forget entirely about the same-sex attractions she once had [...] It was a sad but not unexpected ending to a rare chance for the BBC to acknowledge lesbian sexuality in its programming and for viewers to witness a positive lesbian relationship that didn't ruin anybody's life [...] Sonia or Naomi [...] had the potential to develop a loving depiction of lesbian sexuality but were failed by the show's writers and, arguably, the BBC's institutionalized homophobia.

In 2020, Sara Wallis and Ian Hyland from The Daily Mirror placed Sonia 11th on their ranked list of the best EastEnders characters of all time.

== See also ==
- List of media portrayals of bisexuality
- List of LGBT characters in television and radio
- List of LGBT characters in soap operas
- List of fictional nurses
- List of soap opera villains
