= Taxi! (British TV series) =

British TV comedy drama series (1963–1964)

Taxi! is a BBC television comedy-drama series transmitted in 1963 and 1964.

Created by Ted Willis, who had developed Dixon of Dock Green, Willis was well aware of taxicab drivers' inclination to provide stories, and intended 12 individual plays for what became the first series. Starring Sid James as cab firm owner and driver Sid Stone, it is similar to his role in the near contemporary film Carry On Cabby (1963), but the programme was more a drama with humour than comedy, Jack Rosenthal scripted a few episodes and Bill Owen appeared as the cab firm's co-owner Fred Cudell with Ray Brooks as driver Terry Mills. The three men shared part of a converted house, with Sid Stone tending to interfere in the lives of his colleagues and his customers. James' character was, according to John Fisher, "streetwise, but conscientious".

While ratings for the first series were poor, it was transmitted in the summer, a second series was broadcast in 1964. Female neighbours were now introduced, and Bill Owen's character was written out. The series was produced by Michael Mills among others. Of the 26 episodes broadcast, only one is believed to still exist due to wiping.

== Cast ==
- Sidney James as Sid Stone (26 episodes, 1963-1964)
- Ray Brooks as Terry Mills (26 episodes, 1963-1964)
- Bill Owen as Fred Cuddell (12 episodes, 1963)
- Diane Aubrey as Sandra (11 episodes, 1964)
- Artro Morris as Harry Mason (9 episodes, 1963)
- Michael Kilgarriff as Ron Farnes (7 episodes, 1963)
- Eddie Leslie as Wally Farnes (6 episodes, 1963)
- Sydney Keith as Proprietor of Cab Shelter (6 episodes, 1964)
- Jack Bligh as Old Jonty (6 episodes, 1964)
- Robert Bridges as Tubby Weston (6 episodes, 1963)
- James Beck as Len Gladwin (5 episodes, 1964)
- Joe Ritchie as Andy Martin (5 episodes, 1963)
- Peter Sinclair as Scotty McIvor (5 episodes, 1963)
