= Joe Macer =

Fictional character from EastEnders

- EastEnders character
- Portrayed by: Ray Brooks
- Duration: 2005–2007
- First appearance: Episode 2996; 19 August 2005
- Last appearance: Episode 3303; 26 January 2007
In-universe information
- Occupation: Builder
- Father: Brian Macer
- Mother: Elsie Macer
- Sisters: Bobby Macer
- Wife: Jools Macer (backstory); Pauline Fowler (2006)
- Daughters: Megan Macer; Shelly Macer
- Stepsons: Martin Fowler
- Stepdaughters: Michelle Fowler

Joe Macer is a fictional character from the BBC soap opera EastEnders, played by Ray Brooks. He made his first appearance on 19 August 2005. He was the second husband of Pauline Fowler (Wendy Richard) and her accidental killer. Brooks was axed in July 2006 and Joe was killed off on 26 January 2007, after being pushed out of a window by Jim Branning (John Bardon).

== Character creation and development ==
The character Joe Macer, played by Ray Brooks, was introduced in August 2005 as a love interest for the long running character Pauline Fowler (Wendy Richard). The characters were shown to meet at salsa classes, a relationship was quickly developed and despite Pauline's initial trepidation, 2006 saw her marrying Joe after almost a decade since the death of her first husband, Arthur Fowler (Bill Treacher). Her wedding day was screened to coincide with EastEnders' 21st anniversary. Richard was openly opposed to her character remarrying, but she was eventually convinced by the executive producer and battled—successfully—for Pauline to keep her surname, Fowler.

In July 2006, however, Richard announced that she would be leaving the show. Richard felt that she did not have the same chemistry with Brooks as she did with Treacher. She rejected producers' views that Pauline and Joe "looked good together", and felt that she and Brooks had to work very hard to turn them into a "realistic-looking couple."

Just two months after the wedding was screened, Pauline and Joe's marriage was shown to sour after Joe's criminal past was uncovered. Their relationship steadily deteriorated throughout the year, and in episodes that aired in December 2006 Pauline ended the marriage, removing her wedding ring and informing Joe that he "was half the man that Arthur had been, that she had never really loved him and that their sex life was a sham." The resulting row saw Joe insult Pauline's family, suggesting that her "perfect marriage" with Arthur was "nothing but a fantasy" and calling Mark "diseased", Michelle a "slapper" and Arthur a "con", to which Pauline responded by smashing a plate over his head. Richard has commented "It was not just the memory of Arthur that stopped the marriage to Joe being a success. He was proven to be a weak and untruthful man. That is what caused the marriage to be a non-starter. Pauline was not mean to Joe, he used her…and lied to her."

The destruction of Pauline and Joe's marriage was part of the build-up to the exits of both characters. Pauline was killed off in a "shocking" and dramatic storyline, which saw her collapsing and dying in the middle of Albert Square, leaving both characters and viewers in uncertainty about the cause of her demise. The storyline continued through 2007, as Pauline's funeral was interrupted by the police in order to perform an autopsy on her body, and then Pauline's former daughter-in-law Sonia Fowler (Natalie Cassidy) was arrested for the murder.

However, Sonia's arrest proved to be a red herring, and it was later revealed that the killer blow had actually come from Pauline's husband Joe, who broke down and confessed to Dot Branning (June Brown) that he had rowed with Pauline on Christmas Day (off-screen) and, in a fury, struck her across the head with a frying pan, causing a brain haemorrhage that claimed her life. The plot's eventual climax in February 2007 led to the exits of several established characters connected with Pauline. This included Martin, Sonia and Joe, who was dramatically killed off after confessing to Pauline's murder. Joe fell out of the Fowlers' first floor window while trying to apprehend a hysterical Dot.

== Storylines ==
Joe Macer was widowed in 1982 and has two daughters, Megan (Niky Wardley) and Shelly Macer, from his first marriage. He soon met Pauline Fowler (Wendy Richard), a dancing companion at their salsa dance club, and they become good friends. Joe falls in love with Pauline and proposes to her once in The Queen Victoria public house. She turns Joe down, but he does not give up, and asks her again in February 2006, after falsely telling her that he will leave for Dubai; this time, she accepts. On their wedding day (17 February 2006), Pauline has doubts about remarrying, but goes through with it anyway. However, she chooses to keep her surname as Fowler, as she doesn't want 'a new identity'. Soon after this, Joe admits his former criminal career to Pauline, revealing that his lifelong friend Bert Atkinson (Dave Hill) served time in prison for Joe's crimes, and that he still owes Bert. Joe refuses to choose between Pauline and Bert, and Pauline throws him out of the house. After he and Bert convert Pauline's loft, Pauline forgives him and lets him come home, but their relationship remains uneasy, as she becomes obsessed with her irrational vendetta against her daughter-in-law, Sonia (Natalie Cassidy).

In December 2006, Pauline falsely claims that she is dying of a brain tumour. When Joe goes to the hospital and discovers this is untrue, he leaves Pauline. In one final encounter, Pauline tells Joe she never loved him, insults his lovemaking and tells him she wants nothing more to do with him. Joe responds in kind by calling her "a block of ice in bed," and then smashes her family photographs, insulting in turn her late husband Arthur ("a criminal"), her dead son Mark ("diseased") and her daughter Michelle ("little scrubber"). The heated argument ends with Pauline smashing a plate on Joe's head. Joe leaves to spend Christmas with his daughter, and when he returns on Boxing Day, he is at first shocked to find out that Pauline is dead, but later gets drunk and tells everyone he is pleased she is dead. When the police arrive at Pauline's funeral with news of a murder inquiry, Pauline's son Martin (James Alexandrou) initially believes that Joe must be the suspect, and tries to strangle him, until Sonia owns up and announces it was her the police are investigating. Joe later packs his belongings and goes to live with Megan. He promises Martin he will return for Pauline's second funeral, but he later claims that his car broke down on the motorway, so was unable to attend.

On 25 January 2007, Joe unexpectedly returns to the Fowlers' house, much to the horror of Pauline's friend Dot Branning (June Brown), who is inside the house at the time. Joe reveals to Dot that he had gone back to the house on Christmas Day to try to patch things up with Pauline, but that she harshly told him that he [Joe] was leaving, not her, and continued to insult him and his ways. He told Pauline he felt like lashing out at times, and she dared him to "be a man" and hit her. Joe then describes how, in anger, he picked up a frying pan and hit Pauline hard on the head with it. He left the house after the incident, at which point Pauline was fine, and that was the last time he saw his wife, who later died due to a brain haemorrhage caused by the blow to the head Joe had given her. This causes Dot to realise that Joe is the one who killed Pauline, accident or no accident. She then attempts to phone the police when Joe refuses to own up to Pauline's death, but he snatches the phone out of her hand and throws it away. Joe proceeds to try to stop Dot from leaving, which prompts her to tell him that he will "go to hell" and that she cannot forgive him for what he did, as "only God can do that". At that point, Dot's husband Jim (John Bardon) arrives at the Fowlers' house to find Dot being prevented from leaving by Joe. She quickly exposes Joe as Pauline's killer, just as Joe ends up taking Dot hostage, and Jim rushes over to save her. A struggle ensues, and Jim manages to rescue Dot from Joe. In that moment, Joe falls back and ends up crashing out of a window, ultimately falling to his death when he fatally collapses onto Martin's market stall. Jim looks out of the window as Joe lies dead on the street. The following morning, Joe is exposed as Pauline's killer in public, and his body is subsequently taken away.

== In popular culture ==
A promotional picture of Pauline and Joe was used on the official Torchwood website, in a fictional magazine article about aliens.
