= Natalie Cassidy =

English actress and television personality (born 1983)

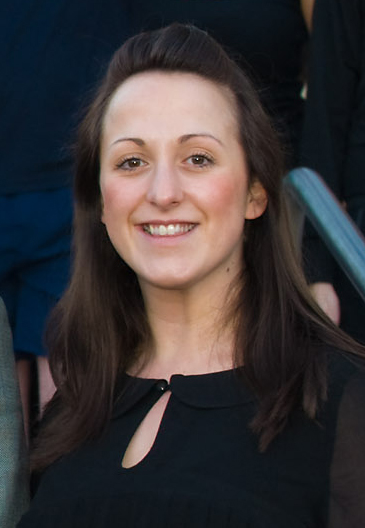
- Cassidy in 2011
- Born: Natalie Ann Cassidy; 13 May 1983 (age 43); Islington, London, England
- Occupations: Actress; television personality
- Years active: 1990–present
- Known for: Role of Sonia Fowler in EastEnders
- Partner(s): Adam Cottrell (2009–2013); Marc Humphreys (2014–present)
- Children: 2

Natalie Ann Cassidy (born 13 May 1983) is an English actress and television personality. She played Sonia Fowler in the BBC soap opera EastEnders (1993–2007, 2010–2011, 2014–2025), for which she won the award for Best Actress at the British Soap Awards and the TV Quick Awards in 2001. Her other television roles include The Catherine Tate Show (2006), Psychoville (2009), Mandy (2020), Motherland (2021), and Boarders (2025).

Outside of acting, Cassidy has fronted the shows Natalie Cassidy's Diet Secrets (2008) and Natalie Cassidy's Real Britain (2009) for the BBC, as well as the E4 series Natalie Cassidy: Becoming Mum (2010). She has hosted the podcasts Life with Nat (2024–present) and Off the Telly (2024–2025), the latter of which was alongside Joanna Page. She has also appeared as a contestant on several reality television shows, taking part in the seventh series of Strictly Come Dancing in 2009 and the ninth series of Celebrity Big Brother in 2012. In 2025, she appeared on the sixth series of The Masked Singer and won the fifth series of Cooking with the Stars, as well as fronting What's the Big Deal: Britain's Best Buys and Natalie Cassidy Learning to Care.

== Early life ==
Natalie Ann Cassidy was born on 13 May 1983 in Islington, London to Charles William Cassidy (1937–2021) and Evelyn Elizabeth Cassidy (née Bellamy; 1938–2002). She has two older brothers David and Anthony. Cassidy attended Islington Green School alongside singer Paloma Faith, who was two years above and Cassidy said used to bully her. She trained at the Anna Scher Theatre School.

== Career ==
=== 1993–2007: EastEnders and theatre work ===
In April 1993, Cassidy appeared in a production of The Beggar's Opera at Barbican Theatre, London. In December 1993, she joined the cast of the BBC soap opera EastEnders as Sonia Jackson, the youngest daughter of the Jackson family. Known for playing the trumpet as a child, her character's key storylines involved her surprise pregnancy which resulted in her giving birth to a daughter Rebecca, aged 15, whom she gives up for adoption, and later kidnaps before regaining custody after the death of her adoptive parents, the death of her fiancé Jamie Mitchell (Jack Ryder), her marriage, divorce and re-marriage to Martin Fowler (James Alexandrou), her lesbian affair with Naomi Julien (Petra Letang) and feud with her mother-in-law Pauline Fowler (Wendy Richard), who's murder she was falsely arrested for. Her initial stint in the soap lasted 13 years, when in April 2006, the BBC announced Cassidy's departure with her final scenes airing in February 2007.

Cassidy also fronted a series Natalie Cassidy Goes Wild in Australia and played a rival to Lauren Cooper in an episode of the BBC Two comedy sketch series The Catherine Tate Show. Following her departure from EastEnders, she began working in theatre, appearing in the UK tours of The Vagina Monologues, Bedroom Farce and Gertrude's Secret, as well as a run of The Cherry Orchard at the Chichester Festival Theatre. Towards the end of 2007, Cassidy made headlines after losing a considerable amount of weight, and released a fitness DVD titled Natalie Cassidy's Then and Now Workout.

=== 2008–present: Other work and EastEnders returns ===
In 2008, she starred in the BBC Three documentary Natalie Cassidy's Diet Secrets. She was also a regular panellist on Five's The Wright Stuff and appeared in BBC Radio 4 play Blithe Spirit. Later that year, she again gained press coverage for giving up her diet and regaining weight. In 2009, Cassidy was cast in a supporting role in the BBC Two comedy television series Psychoville, alongside Dawn French and Eileen Atkins and fronted the series Natalie Cassidy's Real Britain. She also provided the voice-over for BBC Three's Underage and Pregnant. In August 2009, Cassidy was announced as a contestant on the seventh series of Strictly Come Dancing. She was partnered with professional Vincent Simone and the pair were the eleventh couple to be eliminated from the competition, finishing in fifth place.

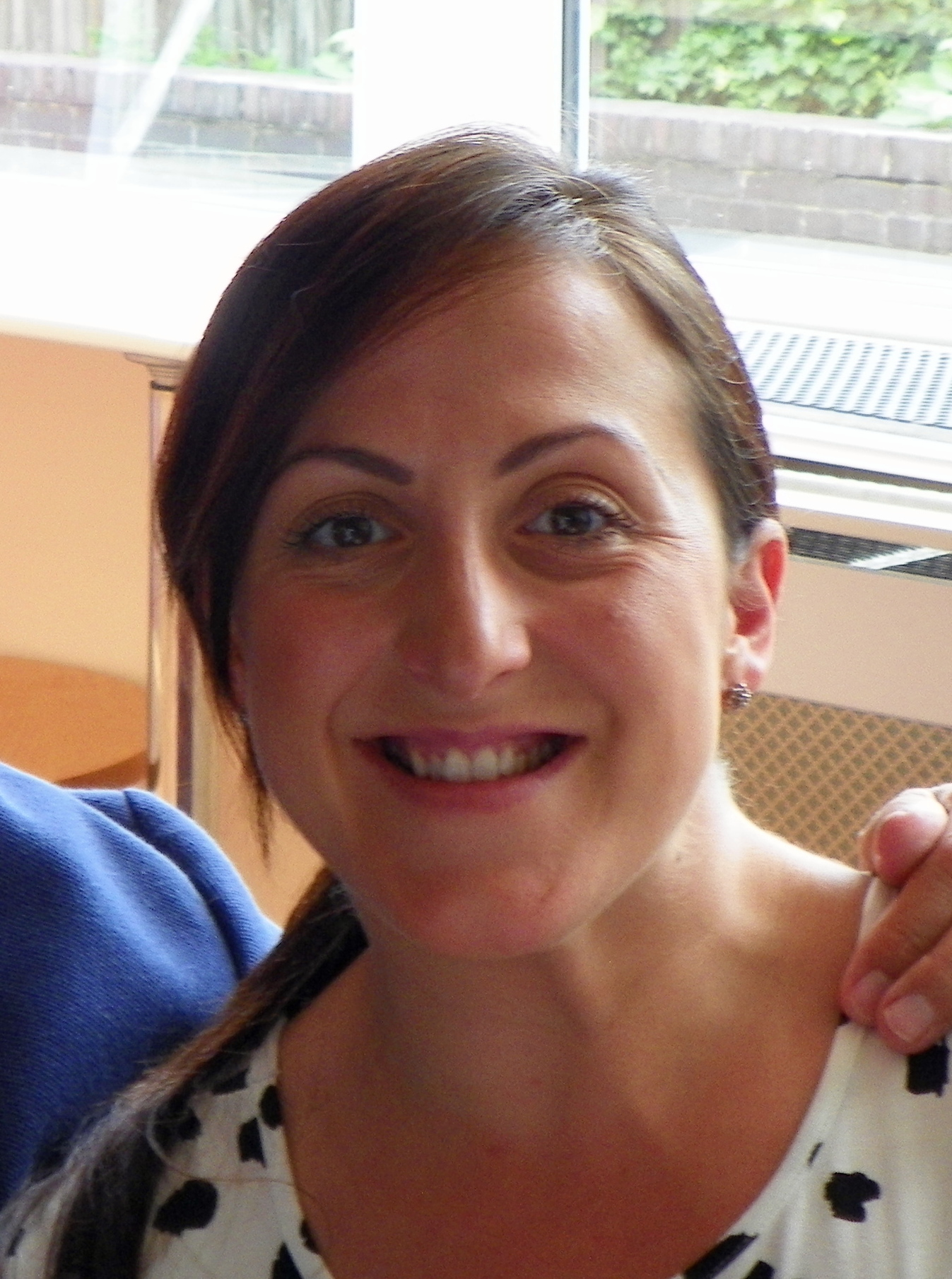
Cassidy in 2016

In October 2009, it was announced that Cassidy would reprise her role as Sonia in EastEnders in 2010. She returned to the soap for a short stint in February 2010, in episodes surrounding the wedding of her on-screen sister Bianca Jackson (Patsy Palmer) and Ricky Butcher (Sid Owen). Cassidy would return to the role again a year later for a single episode in January 2011. In 2010, E4 announced that they would produce Cassidy's own reality show, Natalie Cassidy: Becoming Mum. In January 2012, she entered the Celebrity Big Brother house to appear as a housemate on the ninth series. She became the fifth housemate to be evicted on Day 16. Cassidy subsequently became the host of The Health Lottery, a competition broadcast on Channel 5. In October 2013, it was announced that Cassidy would be making a permanent return to EastEnders the following year. She appeared in Jack and the Beanstalk at the Thameside Theatre in Grays, Essex before returning in January 2014, alongside the character's daughter Bex, now played by Jasmine Armfield. Following her return, her storylines included her divorce from Martin (later played by James Bye), coming out as bisexual, a cancer scare, and a relationship with Tina Carter (Luisa Bradshaw-White).

In August 2020, Cassidy appeared in the BBC comedy series Mandy. She also guest-starred in a 2021 episode of the BBC sitcom Motherland. In 2024, Cassidy began hosting her own podcast Life with Nat, as well as Off the Telly with Joanna Page which ran until the following year. She also took part in The Great Christmas Bake Off. In January 2025, she competed in the sixth series of The Masked Singer as "Bush", reaching the semi-final. The same month it was announced that Cassidy would again be leaving her role as Sonia in EastEnders, following the conclusion of a storyline which saw her enter a relationship with Reiss Colwell (Jonny Freeman), whom she later discovers is married to Debbie Colwell (Jenny Meier), a woman in a coma. Reiss later used money required for Debbie's care to pay for the couple's IVF treatment, before murdering her, which Sonia was wrongly imprisoned for. After being released and discovering the truth, the character gave birth to a daughter in the Queen Victoria pub during the explosion as part of the 40th anniversary celebrations, which results in the deaths of Reiss and Martin. She departed in April 2025. She also appeared in an episode of the BBC comedy series Boarders. Later that year, Cassidy began fronting the consumer affairs programme What's the Big Deal: Britain's Best Buys for Channel 4, and took part in the fifth series of the ITV competition Cooking with the Stars, ultimately winning the series. In October 2025, Cassidy released her autobiography Happy Days and embarked on a book tour, as well her own show An Evening with Natalie Cassidy at Holroyd Community Theatre. She is also set to front a BBC series Natalie Cassidy Learning to Care in which she trains to be a carer.

== In popular culture ==
In 2012, the Channel 4 comedy show Very Important People featured a spoof reality show segment entitled "Natalie Cassidy Is Doing This Now", which showed its subject engaged in various menial and humorous situations, for example hosing out bins, sorting through old pens, rearranging her furniture and taking her spare change to Coinstar. The role of Cassidy was played by comedian Morgana Robinson. Robinson also appeared as Cassidy in her own series Morgana Robinson's The Agency and on an episode of the comedy panel show 8 Out of 10 Cats Does Countdown in 2019. In 2013, she was impersonated by impressionist Philip W. Green on seventh series of Britain's Got Talent.

== Personal life ==
Between 2009 and 2013, Cassidy was in an on-off relationship with Adam Cottrell, a transport manager from Bristol. They have a daughter together, born in September 2010. In 2011, Cottrell was sentenced to 120 hours of unpaid work after pleading guilty to assault and criminal damage for attacking Cassidy at their home in Hertfordshire. He was also given a restraining order banning him from contacting Cassidy for two years. They reunited and became engaged, after Cassidy gave him a "sober up or leave" ultimatum, but they split up permanently in 2013.

Since 2014, Cassidy has been in a relationship with cameraman Marc Humphreys. In October 2015, it was announced that the couple were engaged, and a few months later, in February 2016, Cassidy revealed she was pregnant with her second child. She gave birth to their daughter in August 2016.

In January 2019, it was announced that she would be running the London Marathon with some of her EastEnders co-stars for a dementia campaign in honour of their former castmate Barbara Windsor.

== Filmography ==
Television
Year	Title	Role	Notes	Ref(s)
1993–2007, 2010–2011, 2014–2025	EastEnders	Sonia Fowler	Regular role	
1999	Pudding Lane	Sonia Fowler	Charity special	
2004	Natalie Cassidy Goes Wild in Australia	Herself	Documentary	
2006	The Catherine Tate Show	Cheerleader	Episode: "1951–2006"	
2008	Natalie Cassidy's Diet Secrets	Herself	Documentary	
2008	The Wright Stuff	Herself	Regular panellist	
2009	Things Talk	Sofa / Satsuma	Voice role	
2009	Psychoville	Lorraine	2 episodes	
2009	Natalie Cassidy's Real Britain	Herself	Presenter	
2009	Strictly Come Dancing	Herself	Contestant; series 7	
2010	Natalie Cassidy: Becoming Mum	Herself	Main role	
2009–2011	Underage and Pregnant	Herself	Narrator; 22 episodes	
2012	Celebrity Big Brother	Herself	Housemate; series 9	
2012	Crime Stories	Hannah Stevenson	1 episode	
2020	Mandy	Donna Ball	Episode: "Broadsword to Donna Ball"	
2021	RuPaul's Drag Race UK	Herself	Episode: "BeastEnders"	
2021	Motherland	Ms Vaughn	Episode: "School Trip"	
2022	The Train	Passenger	Web miniseries; episode: "Autumn"	
2024	The Great Christmas Bake Off	Herself	Contestant; 1 episode	
2025	The Masked Singer	Herself / "Bush"	Contestant; series 6	
2025	Boarders	Sharon Hail	1 episode	
2025	What's the Big Deal: Britain's Best Buys	Herself	Presenter	
2025	Cooking with the Stars	Herself	Winner; series 5	
2026	Natalie Cassidy: Caring Together	Herself	Documentary series	
2026	CBeebies Bedtime Story	Herself	One episode	
2026	Alley Cats	Gus's mum	Voice role	

Video
Year	Title	Role	Notes	Ref(s)
2007	Natalie Cassidy's Then and Now Workout	Herself / Presenter	Fitness DVD	

== Stage ==
Year	Title	Role	Venue	Ref(s)
1993	The Beggar's Opera	Child	Barbican Theatre, London	
2007	The Vagina Monologues	Various	UK tour	
2007	Bedroom Farce	Kate	UK tour	
2008	Gertrude's Secret	Eva	UK tour	
2008	The Cherry Orchard	Varya	Chichester Festival Theatre	
2013–2014	Jack and the Beanstalk	Fairy	Thameside Theatre, Essex	
2025	An Evening with Natalie Cassidy	Herself	The Holroyd Community Theatre	

== Podcasts ==
- Off the Telly (2024–2025)
- Life with Nat (2024–present)

== Bibliography ==
- Happy Days (2025)

== Awards and nominations ==
Year	Award	Category	Nominated for	Result	Ref.
2001	British Soap Awards	Best Actress	EastEnders	Won	
2001	TV Quick Awards	Best Soap Actress	EastEnders	Won	
2003	British Soap Awards	Best Actress	EastEnders	Nominated	
2003	British Soap Awards	Best Dramatic Performance	EastEnders	Nominated	
2003	National Television Awards	Most Popular Actress	EastEnders	Nominated	
2004	British Soap Awards	Best Dramatic Performance from a Young Actor or Actress	EastEnders	Won	
2005	TV Quick and TV Choice Awards	Best Soap Actress	EastEnders	Nominated	
2006	National Television Awards	Most Popular Actress	EastEnders	Nominated	
