= Ray Brooks (actor) =

English actor (1939–2025)

- Born: Raymond Michael Brooks; 20 April 1939; Brighton, Sussex, England
- Died: 9 August 2025 (aged 86); Kew, London, England
- Occupation: Actor
- Years active: 1959–2007
- Spouse: Sadie Elcombe (m. 1963)
- Children: 3

Raymond Michael Brooks (20 April 1939 – 9 August 2025) was an English actor.

== Life and career ==
=== Early work ===
Born in Brighton, Sussex, on 20 April 1939, Brooks began his career as a television actor. In 1963 he played Terry Mills in the series Taxi! with Sid James, and the following year he appeared as Norman Phillips in the long-running ITV soap Coronation Street. He also had small roles in British films such as H.M.S. Defiant, Play It Cool and Some People.

Brooks rose to prominence in the UK after starring alongside Michael Crawford and Rita Tushingham in the 1965 film The Knack ...and How to Get It, directed by Richard Lester, which won the Palme d'Or at the Cannes Film Festival that year. Brooks followed up this success starring in the ground-breaking 1966 television drama Cathy Come Home.

In an interview with Sussex Life, Brooks recalled:

I was naive, [...] I thought casting directors would come to me. But although people did offer me work, very often the films didn't materialise because they couldn't get the money together. And, actually, I don't think I was ever that good an actor. I was more an image of a young man. I was never as good looking as, say, my contemporary, David Hemmings. And don't forget this was the period of Terence Stamp. So there was a lot of competition.

Through the 1960s, Brooks also had small roles in a number of other cult television series, including The Avengers, Danger Man, Randall and Hopkirk (Deceased) and Doomwatch. In 1965 he starred as a prominent, slick character in the Gideon's Way episode "Gang War". He played the major role of David Campbell in the Doctor Who film Daleks' Invasion Earth 2150 A.D. (1966).

Brooks had fewer major film roles in the 1970s. He appeared in The Last Grenade (1970) and Alice's Adventures in Wonderland (1972), and in Carry On Abroad (1972) as the oversexed waiter Giorgio. He was also in a number of Pete Walker films including The Flesh and Blood Show (1972), Tiffany Jones (1973) and House of Whipcord (1974). In this decade Brooks released an album of his own songs and built a successful career performing voiceovers for television advertisements and the children's television series Mr Benn.

=== 1980s and 1990s ===
Brooks returned to prominence with the BBC comedy drama Big Deal (1984–1986), in which he co-starred with Sharon Duce. After Big Deal ended, Duce and Brooks starred together, as different characters, in the popular Growing Pains (1992–1993) about a pair of middle-aged foster parents.

In 1980 Brooks narrated David McKee's children's animation King Rollo, following on from his voiceover for McKee's previous creation, Mr Benn. From 1980 to 1985, he played Detective Sergeant Dave Brook on BBC Radio 4 (later on BBC Radio 2) in four series of Detective written by Robert Barr, subsequently repeated on BBC Radio 4 Extra from 2013. Brooks starred in the Edward Boyd thriller Castles in Spain on BBC Radio 4 in 1987.

=== 2000s and 2010s ===
Brooks was the original "next stop" announcement voice of the Tramlink system, before being replaced by Nicholas Owen.

In 2002 Brooks acted in the BBC drama Two Thousand Acres of Sky. He joined the cast of the long-running BBC soap opera EastEnders as Joe Macer in 2005. On 30 September 2006, it was announced that his EastEnders character would leave in January 2007 following the departure of Joe's wife, Pauline Fowler (Wendy Richard), at Christmas. His final appearance was on 26 January when his character confessed to killing Pauline, before falling from a window to his death.

== Personal life, illness and death ==
In 1963, Brooks married Sadie Elcombe, with whom he had three children.

Brooks died from complications related to dementia on 9 August 2025, aged 86.

== Filmography ==
- Captured (1959)
- H.M.S. Defiant (1962) as Hayes
- Play It Cool (1962) as Freddy
- Some People (1962) as Johnnie
- The Knack ...and How to Get It (1965) as Tolen
- Daleks' Invasion Earth 2150 A.D. (1966) as David
- Cathy Come Home (1966) as Reg Ward
- The Last Grenade (1970) as Lt. David Coulson
- The Flesh and Blood Show (1972) as Mike
- Alice's Adventures in Wonderland (1972) as 5 of Spades
- Carry On Abroad (1972) as Georgio
- Tiffany Jones (1973) as Guy
- Assassin (1973) as Edward Craig
- House of Whipcord (1974) as Tony
