= Jasmine Armfield =

English actress (born 1998)

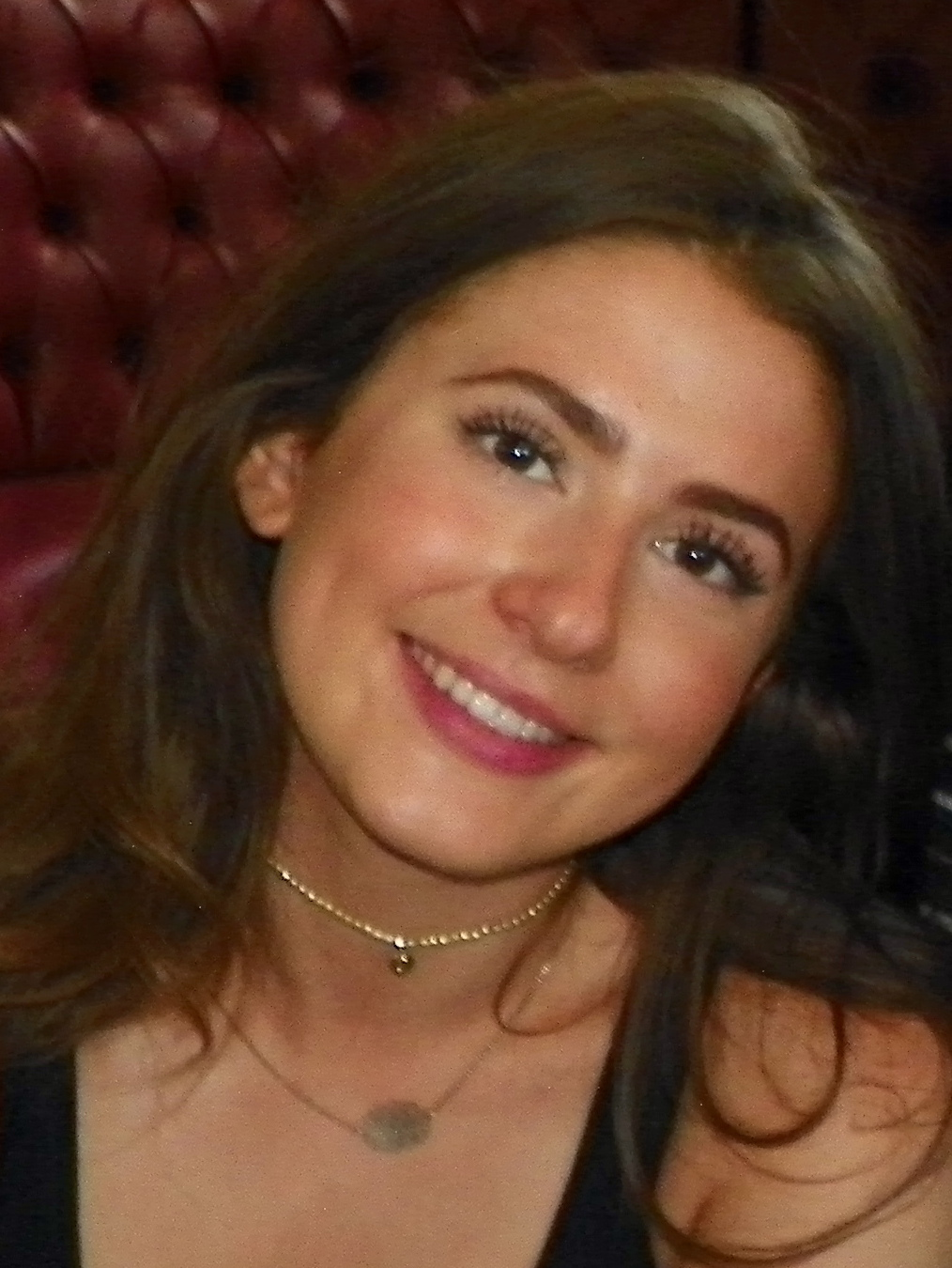
- Armfield in 2016
- Born: 17 December 1998 (age 27); Southend-on-Sea, Essex, England
- Education: The King John School
- Years active: 2014–present
- Television: EastEnders

Jasmine Armfield (born 17 December 1998) is an English actress, known for playing Bex Fowler in the BBC soap opera EastEnders from 2014 to 2020, with a brief stint in 2025. Following her leaving the soap, she has made appearances in fellow BBC series Doctors and Casualty, as well as making her stage debut in Jumping the Shark in 2023.

== Early life ==
Armfield was born on 17 December 1998 in Southend-on-Sea, Essex. She attended The King John School in South Benfleet, Essex and became a student at the Wickford's Pauline Quirke Academy for the Performing Arts when it opened in September 2010.

== Career ==
In 2013, Armfield was cast in the BBC soap opera EastEnders as Bex Fowler, making her first appearance on 15 January 2014. Her storylines on EastEnders included her relationship with Shakil Kazemi (Shaheen Jafargholi), being bullied, losing her virginity, dealing with the grief of Shakil being murdered, getting into the University of Oxford and attempting suicide. In 2017, she was nominated for Best Soap Actress at the TV Choice Awards. She departed on 6 March 2020.

In May 2021, Armfield appeared in an episode of the BBC soap opera Doctors as Layla Roberts. Then in June 2022, Armfield appeared in an episode of the BBC medical drama series Casualty. Later that year, Armfield made her film debut in The Loneliest Boy in the World. A year later, she made her stage debut as Amy in Jumping the Shark. In 2025, Armfield returned to EastEnders for a brief stint, as part of the death of Martin Fowler (James Bye), her onscreen father.

== Filmography ==
Year	Title	Role	Notes
2014–2020, 2025	EastEnders	Bex Fowler	Regular role
2021	Doctors	Layla Roberts	Episode: "The Gift Horse's Mouth"
2022	Casualty	Ivy Edwards	Episode: "One In, One Out"
2022	The Loneliest Boy in the World	Girl	Film
