= Episode 7116 =

2025 episode of EastEnders

- EastEnders episode
- Episode no.: Episode 7116
- Directed by: Owen Tooth
- Written by: Rob Gittins
- Original air date: 8 May 2025
- Running time: 28 minutes

Episode chronology
← Previous; Episode 7115	Next → Episode 7117

Episode 7116 of the British soap opera EastEnders aired on 8 May 2025. It was written by Rob Gittins and directed by Owen Tooth. It is a special episode that marked the 80th anniversary of Victory in Europe Day (VE Day) and it features music, archived footage and nods to Britain during World War II. It also marked the reopening of the Queen Vic, the soap opera's fictional pub, for the first time since it exploded in February 2025. In the episode, Nigel Bates (Paul Bradley), who has early onset dementia, believes that it is 1995 and that there will be a celebration in the Queen Vic, so his friend Jean Slater (Gillian Wright) tries to organise a celebration in order to keep Nigel from being disappointed. Other plots in the episode include Kathy Beale (Gillian Taylforth) and Harvey Monroe's (Ross Boatman) affair and Joel Marshall's (Max Murray) misogynistic behaviour. The episode was well received by viewers and critics, who found it emotional; however, some viewers criticised the new look of the Queen Vic pub as they felt that it looked the same as before.

== Plot ==
In Walford, Nigel Bates (Paul Bradley), who has early onset dementia, believes that it is 1995 and that the residents will be celebrating the 50th anniversary of Victory in Europe Day (VE Day) in the Queen Vic pub that Arthur Fowler (Bill Treacher) has organised. Meanwhile, Linda Carter (Kellie Bright), Elaine Peacock (Harriet Thorpe) and George Knight (Colin Salmon) go into their pub, the Queen Vic, which has been rebuilt after an explosion destroyed it in February 2025. The three are emotional when seeing the inside of the reconstructed pub and Linda says that they cannot as it would be insensitive as Martin Fowler (James Bye) was killed in the explosion. Vicki Fowler (Alice Haig) arrives home and sees that her boyfriend Ross Marshall (Alex Walkinshaw) has left her a voucher to make it up to her after she recently found out that he lied to her about his son committing a crime. She throws it in the bin.

Kathy Beale (Gillian Taylforth) goes to see Harvey Monroe (Ross Boatman), who she is having an affair with, as she is upset over Cindy Beale (Michelle Collins) blackmailing her after she attacked Cindy last Christmas. Kathy tells her son Ian Beale (Adam Woodyatt) that she is worried that she will not be able to spend time with her new-born great-grandson Jimmy Beale if she goes to prison because of Cindy. At the restaurant, Avani Nandra-Hart (Aaliyah James) brushes off Ross' son Joel Marshall (Max Murray) due to his earlier treatment of her after they had sex. Nigel watches videos of the VE Day celebrations in 1945. His friends Jean Slater (Gillian Wright) and Phil Mitchell (Steve McFadden) discuss how Nigel will be disappointed that a celebration is not happening. Nigel buys some flowers that he wants to give to his wife Debbie Bates (Nicola Duffett), though she died in 1995. Not wanting to disappoint Nigel, Jean decides to bring the community together and celebrate VE Day and Martin. Kathy tells Harvey about Cindy's blackmail and also says that cannot handle seeing Jean anymore.

Phil tries to persuade Linda to reopen the pub but Linda does not want to be insensitive to those mourning Martin. However, she changes her mind when other residents persuade her to open the pub again to celebrate and remember Martin and VE Day as a community. Nigel goes to the war memorial and imagines Debbie and her daughter Clare Bates (Gemma Bissix) with him. Vicki and Ross argue at their home and Ross says that he will not give up on her and explains why he hid Joel's crime. In the square, Tommy Moon (Sonny Kendall) suggests that Joel should get Avani a gift to apologise, but Joel refuses and shows a shocked Tommy the video that he filmed of Avani and Joel having sex. At the pub, Billy Mitchell (Perry Fenwick), Honey Mitchell (Emma Barton), Kathy and Mo talk about how life was like in Britain in the war, and Mo talks about her six-year-old friend Ada, who was killed by the bombing. When Nigel arrives at the Vic, he kisses Jean as he thinks that she is Debbie. Ian offers Cindy to get to spend time with Jimmy in exchange for Cindy not going to the police about Kathy, but Cindy refuses. Jean spots the voucher for the camper-van holiday he was planning to have with Kathy and she assumes that he wanted it to book for the Slaters. The residents in the pub talk about how they will remember Martin and the people who died in the war. The residents then dance to Who Do You Think You Are Kidding, Mr. Hitler? before it switches between the residents celebrating and people celebrating in 1945 to Vera Lynn's song We'll Meet Again.

== Development ==
On 28 April 2025, it was announced that EastEnders would air a special episode to mark the 80th anniversary of Victory in Europe Day (VE Day) in order to pay tribute to those who had died fighting for Britain in World War II. The episode coincided with the BBC's own VE tributes on the day, including a live concert. It was reported that the EastEnders episode would have "poignant nods" to wartime Britain and would include historical footage and music from the era, in addition to footage of celebrations that took place on 8 May 1945 in London. EastEnders executive producer Chris Clenshaw said of the episode, "Like many others across the UK who will be marking this poignant moment in history, we wanted to honour and remember those courageous individuals who gave their lives during the war with a special EastEnders episode marking 80 years since V.E. Day." It was also reported that the characters of the soap would "come together" to remember and honour people who died during the war. EastEnders had a history of marking real-life events and milestones in its episodes, such as the Platinum Jubilee of Elizabeth II and sporting events. The soap had also previously marked the 50th anniversary of VE Day in 1995, with Arthur Fowler (Bill Treacher) having organised a street party in the soap for the characters.

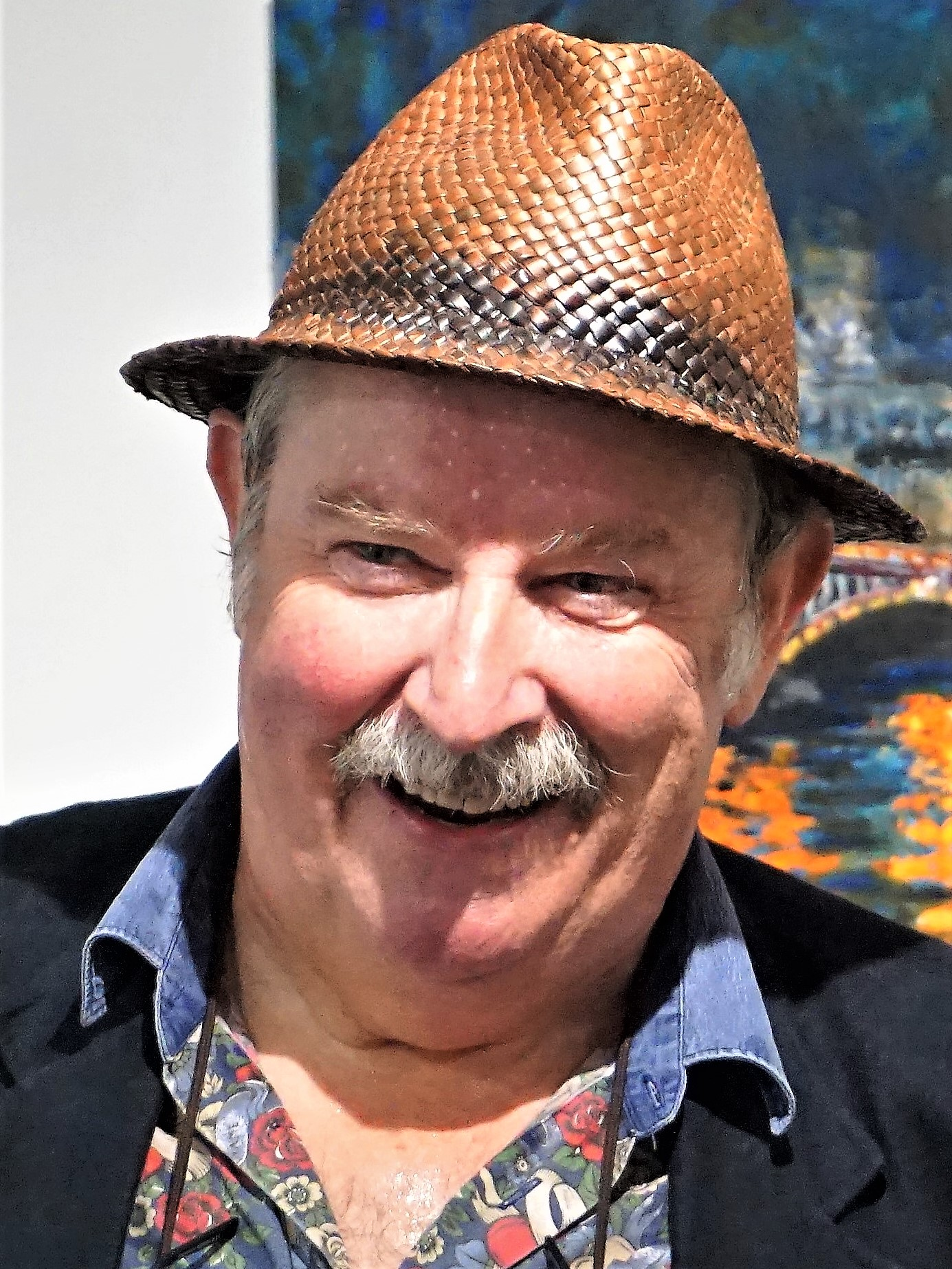
Paul Bradley portrays Nigel, who has Early onset Dementia

It was reported that the episode would see the continuation of Nigel Bates' (Paul Bradley) early onset dementia storyline. The soap worked with various charities, including Dementia UK, to portray the condition sensitively and accurately. In the episode, Nigel believes that it is 1995 and that there will be a party to celebrate 50 years since VE Day. Nigel imagines his deceased wife Debbie Bates (Nicola Duffett) and her daughter Clare Bates (Gemma Bissix) standing at the war memorial with him. He also refers to various former characters, such as Arthur and Peggy Mitchell (Barbara Windsor). It was also reported before the episode's release that the plot would include the continuation of the affair between Kathy Beale (Gillian Taylforth) and Harvey Monroe (Ross Boatman), and it was teased that the affair would be almost exposed when Harvey's partner Jean Slater (Gillian Wright) finds a brochure for a holiday that Harvey planned to take with Kathy, although Jean assumes that it is for her family.

The episode also features the reopening of the Queen Vic pub, which had been closed since its explosion in the soap's 40th anniversary in February 2025 which had killed off long-term character Martin Fowler (James Bye). In the episode, the Walford residents decide to congregate at the pub to celebrate VE day. Earlier in the week, Linda Carter (Kellie Bright), Elaine Peacock (Harriet Thorpe) and George Knight (Colin Salmon) had been excited to reopen the pub, but when they announce that they are planning to reopen it in time for VE Day, the residents are not happy as they think it is in "poor taste" due to Martin's death. This is not the response that they were looking for and it leaves Elaine "really mortified", and Linda becomes adamant that the pub should not reopen yet in order to be sensitive to Martin's death. However, the locals are later persuaded to celebrate VE Day and the reopening of the pub by Jean and others, and Linda realises that reopening the pub is a way for people to pay tribute to those who have died, including Martin. An EastEnders insider called it a "real light bulb moment" for Linda.

The episode originally aired on 8 May 2025 at 7:30pm on BBC One. It was made available on BBC iPlayer by that time. The episode was directed by Owen Tooth and written by Rob Gittins. It begins with black and white footage of Spitfire planes in the sky and scenes of destroyed buildings and debris in the East End of London due to The Blitz. The scenes then cut between the present day and the archived footage of the clear-up operation during the Blitz, both in black and white. Various characters pay tribute to soldiers who lost their lives in the war and Nigel references Christopher Fowler, Martin's grandfather who served in the war in the soap timeline. Nigel also refers to "Blitz spirit". The end of the episode features Vera Lynn's song We'll Meet Again whilst the residents toast the soldiers who died, and it also shows archived footage of people celebrating VE day in 1945.

== Reception ==
Dan Laurie from Belfast Live believed that Nigel's dementia storyline in the episode was touching. He also noted how the Queen Vic reopened to "remember the heroes who made the ultimate sacrifice" and how the community was "brought together" to remember those who died in the war. Michael Adams from Metro believed that episode had a really "poignant" ending and that there was "some joy" in it due to the Queen Vic reopening, which he also called "emotional". Kiesha Dosanjh from the Daily Mirror reported how viewers revealed on social media that the episode left them emotional. She also opined that it was a "heartbreaking episode" for Nigel. Additionally, Dosanjh also believed that the emotional episode also featured a close call for Kathy and Harvey as Jean spotted them hugging, adding, "Luckily, Jean was none the wiser as they managed to play it off, but for how much longer?" Emily Stedman from Digital Spy called the episode "Two celebrations in one!" due to VE day celebrations coinciding with the reopening of the Queen Vic pub. Stedman called the idea to celebrate VE day at the Queen Vic "novel" and a "sweet gesture" to Nigel, and she also called Nigel's belief that it he is celebrating the 1995 party a bittersweet moment. She later called the episode emotional and opined that it had a tragic twist for Nigel.

Liam De Brun from Manchester Evening News reported that despite the episode being well received, various viewers complained on social media about the lack of makeover that the Queen Vic pub had received, with some saying that it looked almost identical to what it did before the explosion. De Brun also opined that Nigel displayed "worrying health signs" in the episode, such as when he kissed Jean believing that she was Debbie. Laura-Jayne Tyler from Inside Soap commented on Linda's earrings in the episode, writing, "It's a wonder Linda can move with such gigantic earrings weighing her down. You'll find smaller anchors aboard HMS Belfast". Tyler's colleague, Johnathon Hughes, wrote, "At long last, the famous watering hole opens its doors once more, ready to welcome loyal customers and commemorate the brave".
