= Christine Hewitt =

Fictional character from the BBC soap opera EastEnders

- EastEnders character
- Portrayed by: Elizabeth Power
- Duration: 1992–1993
- First appearance: Episode 736; 25 February 1992
- Last appearance: Episode 906; 7 October 1993
- Introduced by: Leonard Lewis
In-universe information
- Occupation: Cook
- Husband: Greg Hewitt (until 1993)
- Sons: Jonathan Hewitt

Christine Hewitt (credited as Mrs Hewitt) is a fictional character from the BBC soap opera EastEnders, played by Elizabeth Power. Introduced in 1992 as a lonely divorcée, she becomes besotted with married Arthur Fowler (Bill Treacher) while he tends her garden. She was initially introduced for five episodes, but returned for a longer stint in a storyline that sees her begin an affair with Arthur. She leaves in 1993 once her affair is discovered by his wife Pauline Fowler (Wendy Richard).

== Creation and development ==
Elizabeth Power was offered the role by one of the programme's producers, Leonard Lewis, for whom she'd worked with previously on Juliet Bravo and Softly, Softly. She has commented "I got a call out of the blue asking if I could go up to the BBC at Elstree to meet him. Mrs Hewitt was going to be in five episodes and I thought, 'wonderful'." Mrs Hewitt makes her first appearance on-screen in February 1992, as a lonely divorcee who employs the long running character, Arthur Fowler (Bill Treacher), to tend to her garden—used as a plot device to rebuild Arthur's relationship with his son Mark Fowler (Todd Carty), while they work together on Christine's garden. Power filmed her scenes for the five episodes and thought that would be the end of it; however, she was subsequently contacted by Leonard Lewis and asked to reprise the role. Power commented "It was all I could do to stop myself screeching down the phone. They didn't tell me which direction the story was going to take. I got on so well with [Bill Treacher] from the word go. We really liked each other." Mrs Hewitt was reintroduced in a storyline that saw her become Arthur Fowler's mistress. Discussing the affair, Treacher told TV Times in 1992 that Christine makes a fuss of Arthur and tells him that he can do "anything he wants", which leads to a "little bubble" beginning to form between the two of them as Arthur does not get that encouragement "at home". Power left the series after the end of the affair, making her final appearance in October 1993.

== Storylines ==
Christine is first seen in February 1992, as a client of Arthur Fowler (Bill Treacher) who is hiring himself out as a gardener. After Arthur advertises for a new gardening assistant, he is shocked when Christine arrives in Walford, enquiring about the job. She wants it for her son Jonathan (Jonny Lee Miller), but when he proves lazy and unreliable, an embarrassed Mrs Hewitt takes his place as Arthur's assistant.

In May 1992, a phone call from New Zealand brings news that Kenny Beale (Michael Attwell) has been in a car crash, so Arthur's wife Pauline (Wendy Richard) decides to go there to tend to her injured brother. While Pauline is away, Christine becomes a regular visitor to Albert Square, causing a certain amount of gossip, and it is clear that she is becoming very fond of Arthur. Arthur is oblivious, but Pauline's brother Pete Beale (Peter Dean) is more astute and he tries to remind Christine that Arthur is a married man. However, Christine manages to win him round and Pete starts taking her out for a while instead. In August, things come to a head when Christine actually makes a pass at Arthur. He turns her down and she disappears, sending him a letter and a photo conveying her feelings. Arthur visits her at her house, and tells her that he feels something for her too, but is married and loves his wife and they say goodbye.

Pauline learns all about Christine through local gossip, mostly told by Dot Cotton (June Brown), when she returns to Walford. She initially believes Arthur when he feigns innocence, but that changes when she discovers Christine's letter and photo. A furious Pauline then visits Christine to discover the truth, and finds her to be a sad, lonely figure who drinks too much in the afternoon. Pauline is then persuaded to forgive and forget, but Arthur cannot resist one last meeting with Christine himself, which gives her renewed hope. Over the next few weeks, Arthur keeps finding excuses to drop in on Christine, until she tells him not to come unless he means business. On Christmas Eve, Arthur sneaks away from home to be with Christine and they end the night having sex together.

The affair continues during 1993, with Arthur continuously running between Christine and Pauline. Christine becomes more needy and manipulative, cooking up absurd lies and a fake burglary to lure Arthur round and drinking alcohol if he refuses to come. Kathy Beale's (Gillian Taylforth) decision to open the café in the evenings as a bistro gives Christine an opportunity to see more of Arthur — she applies to be the cook and gets the job. However, working in Walford is not enough for Christine, and she begins to make greater demands on Arthur, asking him to choose between her and Pauline. Arthur manages to put her off and begins having second thoughts about their affair, after which Christine's behaviour becomes more erratic. She begins stalking Arthur around the Square, drunkenly declaring her love for him, buying inappropriate gifts for his son Martin (Jon Peyton Price) and threatening to tell Pauline unless he tells her first.

In September, under severe pressure, Arthur finally tells Pauline the truth, and tries to tell her that he wants her and not Christine. Hurt, embarrassed and angry, Pauline refuses to listen and throws him out, but not before hitting him round the face with a frying pan and throwing a television at him. This spells the end for Christine, as Arthur then decides he wants nothing more to do with her, and in October she disappears to face a lonely future, divorced by her husband Greg (Robert Swann), and ditched by her lover. In December of the same year Christine sends a wreath to Pete's funeral, which is only seen by Dr Legg (Leonard Fenton) and Ethel Skinner (Gretchen Franklin). Ethel doesn't know who Christine is and Dr Legg is hesitant to say, only telling Ethel that Christine used to work in the café.

== Reception ==
The unlikely affair between Christine and Arthur was dubbed the 'Bonk of the Year' by tabloids in the British press. According to Power, Australian director Russell Mulcahy was a fan of EastEnders and while in Hollywood he used to get friends to video the Arthur and Mrs Hewitt scenes. It was due to his like of the storyline and characters that he cast Power and Treacher opposite one another again in the film Tale of the Mummy. She has commented, "he thought it would be a good idea to get us together again. He thought it would be a great joke. We played a caretaker and his wife." Judy Ewens from TV Times called Christine a "glamorous divorcee" that disrupted what appeared to be one of EastEnders' strongest marriages. Ewens also wrote that unlike Pauline, Christine treated Arthur with "respect and admiration".
