= Pauline Fowler =

Fictional character from EastEnders

- EastEnders character
- Portrayed by: Wendy Richard
- Duration: 1985–2006
- First appearance: Episode 1 "Poor Old Reg"; 19 February 1985
- Last appearance: Episode 3282; 25 December 2006
- Created by: Tony Holland and Julia Smith
- Introduced by: Julia Smith
- Book appearances: Home Fires Burning; Swings and Roundabouts
- Spin-off appearances: Dimensions in Time (1993)
In-universe information
- Occupation: Launderette assistant Cleaner; Barmaid; Factory worker
- Family: Beale/Fowler
- Father: Albert Beale
- Mother: Lou Beale
- Brothers: Harry Beale; Ronnie Beale; Kenny Beale; Pete Beale
- Sisters: Maggie Flaherty; Dora Beale; Norma Beale
- Husband: Arthur Fowler (until 1996); Joe Macer (2006)
- Sons: Mark Fowler; Martin Fowler
- Daughters: Michelle Fowler
- Grandsons: Mark Fowler Jnr; Roman Fowler; Arthur Fowler Jnr (adoptive)
- Granddaughters: Vicki Fowler; Bex Fowler; Hope Fowler; Lily Slater (adoptive)
- Aunts: Flo
- Nephews: Ian Beale; David Wicks; Conor Flaherty
- Nieces: Elizabeth Beale
- Other relatives: Nellie Ellis; Lucy Beale; Peter Beale; Bobby Beale; Bianca Jackson; Joe Wicks; Mary Flaherty

Pauline Fowler is a fictional character from the BBC One soap opera EastEnders. She was played by actress Wendy Richard between the first episode on 19 February 1985 and 25 December 2006. Pauline was created by scriptwriter Tony Holland and producer Julia Smith as one of EastEnders' original characters. She made her debut in the soap's first episode on 19 February 1985, and remained for twenty-one years and ten months, making her the second-longest-running original character to appear continuously, surpassed only by her nephew Ian Beale (Adam Woodyatt). Since then, she has been surpassed by Letitia Dean who plays Sharon Watts. Pauline has featured in archive footage twice since her departure: in 2010, celebrating the show's 25th anniversary, and in 2025, celebrating the show's 40th anniversary.

Pauline is a member of the Beale family. Her storylines focus on drudgery, money worries, and family troubles. The matriarchal stalwart of the fictional London community of Albert Square, she is at first portrayed as a loving, doting, very family-oriented mother. In later years, however, she becomes a more stoic, opinionated battle-axe who alienates her relatives through overbearing interference. Pauline is married to the downtrodden Arthur Fowler (Bill Treacher); when she finds out he had a one-night stand with Christine Hewitt (Elizabeth Power), she hits him with a frying pan. Their marriage remains rocky until his death in 1996. She is used for comedic purposes in scenes with her launderette colleague Dot Cotton (June Brown), and scriptwriters included many feuds in her narrative, most notably with her daughter-in-law, Sonia Fowler (Natalie Cassidy), Queen Vic Landlady Peggy Mitchell (Barbara Windsor), who cruelly announced to the public that Pauline’s son Mark Fowler (Todd Carty) has AIDS, and Den Watts (Leslie Grantham), a family friend who got her daughter Michelle Fowler (Susan Tully) pregnant at 16. A famous episode in 1986 which includes Pauline discovering that Den is the father of Michelle's baby, drew over 30 million viewers, and was listed at number 36 in The Times' 1998 list of "Top 100 cult moments in Film". Richard announced Pauline's retirement from the serial in July 2006, and the character was killed off in a "Whodunit?" murder storyline, with Richard making her final appearance on 25 December 2006.

Pauline was a staple in the UK press during her time in EastEnders, representative of the symbiosis between Britain's soaps and tabloid newspapers. Widely-read tabloids such as The Sun and Daily Mirror, would routinely publish articles about forthcoming developments in Pauline's storylines. Critical opinion on the character differs. She has been described as a "legend" and a television icon, but was also voted the 35th "most annoying person of 2006" (being the only fictional character to appear on the list). The character is well-known even outside of the show's viewer-base, and away from the on-screen serial, Pauline has been the subject of television documentaries, behind-the-scenes books, tie-in novels, and comedy sketch shows.

== Character creation ==
=== Background ===
Pauline Fowler is one of the original 23 characters invented by the creators of EastEnders, Tony Holland (1940–2007) and Julia Smith (1927–1997). Holland had drawn on his own London background for inspiration, naming three of the original characters after his own relatives, specifically his aunt Lou and her children, Holland's cousins, fraternal twins Pete and Pauline. This family setup of a woman named Lou Beale, with twin children Pete and Pauline, was recreated on-screen as the first family of EastEnders, the Beales and Fowlers.

Pauline's original character outline as written by Smith and Holland appears in an abridged form in their book, EastEnders: The Inside Story.

Pete's twin sister. Forty, and a chip off the Lou Beale block. Plucky, and determined to battle through whatever the odds. A warm, practical, unsophisticated woman: you stand by your man, do your duty, fight for your kids and have a roast for Sunday dinner ... She's also pregnant ... She actually remembers her dad [Albert] saying "Two things we don't discuss in this house are religion and politics". She also remembers her dad smoked a pipe, and wishes her husband did too. She loved her dad very much ... Maybe she didn't go into her marriage with quite the right spirit? She was due to be chief bridesmaid at her sister's wedding but she'd got the flu and was confined to bed. Arthur, someone she'd known from school, was given permission to visit the invalid upstairs. He found himself proposing to her. Years later he said "It was to cheer her up really." And Pauline found herself accepting too ... She's very fond of her twin brother, Pete (and knows that he's mum's favourite). She's very conventional, and the salt of the earth. Jolly, rounded, someone you can get your arms round. She doesn't trust skinny people.

=== Casting ===
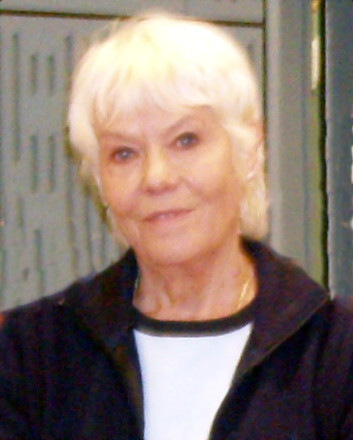
Wendy Richard (pictured) played Pauline consistently for twenty-one years.

From the beginning, Smith considered the role ideal for Wendy Richard, with whom she had worked on the 1960s BBC soap, The Newcomers; Holland and Smith decided to approach her about the role, even though their casting policy was not to use "stars"—Richard was already well known in the UK for playing glamorous roles, such as List of Are You Being Served? characters#Miss Shirley jr Brahms in the successful sitcom Are You Being Served? At their first meeting, Tony Holland informed Richard that they were planning a programme that would not "duck social issues but would be a hard-hitting drama including teenage pregnancy, drugs, racial conflict, prostitution, rape, mental illness, homosexuality, alcoholism, and muggings among its subjects." In order to carry such controversial storylines, Richard was told that "powerful characters to whom things just naturally happened" had been invented, and two families, the Fowlers and the Beales, were to form the core of the soap's narrative. In her autobiography, Richard states, "If I accepted, my character was to be Pauline Fowler. A middle-aged mother of two teenagers, with a late baby on the way, Pauline worked part-time at the launderette, voted Labour and supported Arsenal. She was married to Arthur, who was out of work and was really a bit of a failure, not much good at anything in life." Richard thought it sounded like a challenging role.

There were initial fears that Richard's glamorous image would not work for the character and Smith also feared that Richard would be apprehensive about playing Pauline, who would be anything but glamorous, but these fears were swept aside when Richard announced that she was sick of glamour and wanted to play her own age. Richard has commented, "although it would be such a huge transformation of my screen image, it was after all my twenty-fifth year in showbusiness, and I'd realised that I couldn't go on playing dolly birds forever ... I knew right away I would be mad to turn down the part of Pauline."

After she accepted the role, Richard was told by Julia Smith that she would have to change her appearance, to make it more in keeping with Pauline's unglamorous lifestyle. This included having her hair cut. Richard commented on this: "I was very proud of my long hair, which had taken me years to grow. I hadn't had it cut short for nineteen years but reluctantly, I agreed ... I cried my eyes out for the rest of the day after that traumatic hair cut." From September 1984, Richard was involved in pre-production of the series, covering every angle, from hair, costume design and make-up to organising the set interior of her character's screen house. Richard has said that Pauline had been given extensive biographical detail, including minute specifics, such as her fictional time of her birth: "It was vital that we should get to know our own characters intimately and so the cast initially sat together in family groups to learn our lines and bond with our 'relations' ... it was essential to develop the rapport that families, who'd been together for years, would naturally have." Richard's casting was considered to be "a giant leap of faith" by co-creators Holland and Smith, but one that ultimately "landed on its feet", because Pauline went on to be one of the longest running characters in EastEnders' history, remaining with the show for nearly twenty-two years.

== Character development and impact ==
=== Lineage and personality ===
The character of Pauline was a cornerstone of EastEnders; the lynchpin of the Fowler/Beale family around whom the soap was originally structured. At the beginning of the serial in 1985, Pauline was a 40-year-old married mother with two teenage children, Mark and Michelle, and another child on the way. The fictional history of her younger years has been told via behind-the-scenes books such as EastEnders: The Inside Story, and the second tie-in novel by Hugh Miller, Swings and Roundabouts, which explains that Pauline was born and raised at 45 Albert Square, where she lived for her entire life. She married Arthur Fowler in 1965, raising her own children in the same house where she grew up.

Whereas most of the other female characters in EastEnders were portrayed in a somewhat more glamorous working-class way, Pauline Fowler was the exception to the rule, being the sole character to represent the "homely and domestic" side of the Beale family. As the serial progressed, the character altered from her original outline. Instead of being the jolly, warm character she was during the show's early years, she became a sombre battle-axe, hardened by a life of misery in Albert Square. Other characters refer to her as "Fowler the growler", and in the Evening Gazette she was described as "the Boadicea of battle-axes." The initial change in her demeanour is traced back to the death of her mother, Lou Beale (Anna Wing), a fierce dowager, who ruled over her family with a "rod of iron". Following Lou's screen funeral in July 1988, Pauline retorts, "Shut up Arthur Fowler, no one interrupts Pauline Beale when she's in full flow", a line that was used similarly by Lou in the episode that preceded her own death. This parallel symbolised the transference of the family's matriarchal role from Lou to Pauline. Wendy Richard indicated that both she and show creator Julia Smith had always intended for Pauline to become like her mother, and former EastEnders executive producer John Yorke has commented on the importance of the lineage between the two characters: "[Pauline] endures, stoically and heroically, whatever life may throw at her, just as her mother did before her. This sense of lineage is vitally important, too. Pauline has been in the show since its start and was handed the role of matriarch on Lou Beale's death."

=== Early storylines ===
In the first episode, it is revealed that Pauline, aged 40, is pregnant with her third child. The character's pregnancy quickly became a prominent storyline within the series. Pauline, against her mother's opposition, is determined to keep the baby. The storyline was used to spread a public message on the increased risk of genetic defects in late pregnancies, with Pauline undergoing amniocentesis tests. The storyline culminates with the birth of the serial's first baby, Martin, in July 1985.

Pauline's early storylines concentrate on family and money troubles: coping with her husband Arthur's redundancy, mental breakdown and imprisonment; eldest son Mark's delinquency; and daughter Michelle's teenage pregnancy.

"Pauline was suffering from ill health ... It was at this stage of the storyline in 1989 that an attempt was made to write [Pauline] out of EastEnders all together ... I was pretty pissed off ... Rumours circulated that some of us were to be replaced and I never really felt secure until [executive producer] Michael Ferguson took over."

— Wendy Richard

In 1989, the character was used to highlight another important gynaecological health issue, fibroids. The storyline sees Pauline ignoring health problems, such as chronic fatigue, and using homoeopathic preparations rather than seeking medical assistance. Her fibroids are discovered by chance, when the character Ricky Butcher (Sid Owen) knocks her down in his Austin Mini. In the 1989 Boxing Day episode, Pauline spends time in hospital, recovering from a necessary hysterectomy. Wendy Richard has since revealed that the storyline had originally been scripted differently. Before the outcome of Pauline's illness was screened, producers had decided that the character was to be killed off with cancer. This was a decision that had been made by the show's boss, Mike Gibbon, to refresh the format by replacing some of the serial's older characters. The scriptwriters went as far as giving Pauline a mystery illness. The newly appointed executive producer, Michael Ferguson, decided to scrap the original storyline, believing that Pauline, as one of the soap's original characters, was too valuable an asset to lose. The storyline was rewritten and the character was given a different gynaecological ailment that was treatable.

=== Marriage to Arthur Fowler ===
Pauline's marriage to the luckless Arthur is central to her character, remaining one of her defining traits even after his death in 1996. The dynamics of the relationship were clear from the beginning of the programme, with Pauline depicted as the matriarchal force that holds the Fowler family together, while Arthur is depicted as weak, emotionally unstable and easily dominated by the stronger females of his family. Writer Jacquetta May, who once played Rachel Kominski in the programme, has commented that "[Pauline and Arthur] represented the matriarchal relationship of strong woman/weak man ... Arthur, only sporadically employed and disabled by a breakdown, often behaved like a little boy, while Pauline had to make the decisions and keep the family functioning in the face of poverty and unemployment, teenage pregnancy and depression." Pauline and Arthur were generally seen as the most stable couple in the show, so Arthur's affair with Christine Hewitt (Lizzie Power) came as a shock to viewers. The storyline was long-running, beginning early in 1992 with the introduction of lonely divorcee Christine, who employs Arthur to tend to her garden. A romance between Arthur and Christine steadily develops throughout the year, facilitated by Pauline's lengthy absence; she is called abroad to tend to her crippled brother Kenny in early June, and she does not return until late September (in reality, Wendy Richard had to be temporarily written out of EastEnders to allow her to act in Grace and Favour). The build-up to the affair contains many twists and turns, starting with Arthur's rebuff of Christine's advances, then a confrontation between Pauline and Christine, which convinces Pauline of Arthur's innocence and leaves her feeling "strangely sorry for the pathetic, lonely figure, who obviously drank too much". The episode in which Arthur finally gives into temptation and sleeps with Christine aired on Christmas Eve 1992.

The storyline continued throughout 1993 as Christine makes greater demands on Arthur, threatening to tell Pauline about their affair unless he does so himself. In September 1993, the situation finally reaches a climax on-screen. The scriptwriters had many conferences about ways in which Pauline would find out about the affair; "should she work it out herself or should some third party tell her the truth?" In the end it was felt that Arthur should tell her himself, and when he does, Pauline becomes violent, throwing an ashtray and a television at Arthur during the revelation – and, most memorably, hitting him in the face with a frying pan. Although the audience had witnessed Pauline and Arthur rowing many times, this was something different, "an act of betrayal on a massive scale." Series production manager Rona McKendrick commented: "It was one of the few times when you saw Pauline really, really let rip ... you really felt the anger, understood the anger and realised why she went as far as she did." This episode (written by Tony McHale and directed by Keith Boak) was chosen by writer Colin Brake as the episode of the year in EastEnders: The First Ten Years and is described by Wendy Richard as "Pauline's crowning moment."

Pauline hits Arthur with a frying pan after he admits to an affair with Christine Hewitt

For a while it seems that EastEnders' "most solid" marriage is over, but Arthur spends the rest of 1993 trying to convince Pauline that it is worth saving and they eventually reconcile. However, more tragedy follows, when Arthur is framed by a conman, Willy Roper (dubbed "Wicked Willy" by the British press), and wrongfully imprisoned for embezzlement in 1995. The storyline captured the public's imagination and a nationwide "Free Arthur Fowler" campaign was launched. "Arthur Fowler Is Innocent" T-shirts were produced and a single was even released in the UK Singles Chart promoting the campaign.

Arthur's imprisonment was a precursor to the final exit of actor Bill Treacher, who decided to leave EastEnders after 11 years playing Arthur. While Arthur goes to pieces in prison, Pauline is heavily embroiled in the storyline pertaining to his eventual release. For several months viewers witnessed Willy attempt to woo Pauline, but she eventually uncovers his deception and then resorts to uncharacteristic seduction to gain his confession. A critic for the Sunday Mirror commented, "Pauline Fowler deserves a Golden Cardie Award for her performance in EastEnders. The way which she extracted a confession from Willy Roper over the money he stole was nothing short of brilliant." Arthur is exonerated, but his joyful reunion with Pauline is cut short when he dies of a brain haemorrhage shortly after his release. His death ends an 11-year screen marriage, the longest run of any marriage in the serial.

=== Importance of family ===
Pauline remains a family-oriented character throughout the course of the show. A "fiercely loyal, but overbearing mother"; sheltering and taking on the major responsibilities of her children and frequently stressing the importance of family. She is portrayed as a traditionalist, with strict rules and beliefs—the first to criticise, but also the first to defend her children, often interfering in their issues and causing rifts in their relationships. The quintessential matriarch, she has also been compared with Queen Elizabeth, with the storylines in the fictional Albert Square, mirroring the troubles of England as a whole. In Monarchies: What Are Kings and Queens For, the author points out similarities between the matriarchal nature of Pauline's character, and that of the Queen. "Both exhibit a rich mix of suffering and duty. Pauline has tried to bring up her family as best she can, even though it hasn't always been easy. Her offspring have caused her nothing but trials and tribulations; her husband has been wayward at times and caused her several eyebrow-raising moments. But Pauline has steadfastly carried on ..."

Early storylines between Pauline and her two teenage children, Mark and Michelle, show her to be a doting mother, forgiving of Mark's wayward behaviour, and supportive when Michelle decides to become a teenage mum. Pauline is devoted to her twin brother Pete, dutiful to her mother Lou, allegiant to her husband Arthur, and a shoulder for her nephew, Ian, to cry on. Wendy Richard commented in 1990, "It's important for her to keep the family together. That's why when her problem son Mark suddenly came home [in 1990], it was like her winning the pools ... She had to take a lot of shocks from Michelle and I think she coped remarkably well."

As the serial progressed, Pauline contends with a plethora of family upsets, which include many deaths—her mother Lou in 1988, brother Pete in 1993 and husband Arthur in 1996—as well as her elder son Mark's fatal battle with HIV. After a year long build-up, Mark is shown to reveal his HIV status to his stunned and devastated parents in an episode that aired on Boxing Day 1991, attracting 19 million viewers. Wendy Richard has given her interpretation of Pauline's reaction to Mark's news: "To say she was shell-shocked was an understatement and, not knowing enough about HIV, she and Arthur were worrying that their eldest son might die from AIDS at any moment." The HIV plot had many ramifications for the character of Pauline, as she struggles to come to terms with her son's condition. It was also instrumental in raising public awareness about the illness, which was still the subject of much ignorance when EastEnders tackled it in 1991. When the storyline initially aired, more people went for a HIV test in Britain than at any other time. Wendy Richard commented: "The storyline with Mark Fowler, when he announced he was HIV positive, was really well done. People have to be aware that HIV and AIDS are not exactly the same thing. The Minister of Health who was in power at that time wrote a letter complimenting us for the way that we had put the information across."

The HIV storyline came to an end on-screen in 2003, when executive producer Louise Berridge decided to axe Mark Fowler. In the serial, Mark discovers his HIV medication is failing, but instead of allowing Pauline to witness his deterioration, he leaves to spend the remainder of his life travelling. Richard has classed Mark's exit as her most difficult storyline, commenting: "I was so genuinely upset that Todd Carty, who played Mark, was going I could barely get my lines out for want of crying—but everybody said I acted it well. It was, I think, ten per cent acting and 90 per cent me crying my eyes out because I was being selfish and didn't want Todd to go." Mark, who had appeared intermittently for 18 years, was eventually killed off-screen in 2004, dying of an AIDS-related illness.

In the latter years of her time in the soap, Pauline changes from a caring mother into a more inflexible battle-axe. Pauline's relationship with Martin is often shown to be strained by Pauline's refusal to release control over his life. Though initially a teenage delinquent, following Mark's death in 2004, Martin becomes Pauline's "dutiful son", forced to put his mother's wishes above those of his wife—a recurring theme within the serial. Eventually, this causes a rift between the two characters. When Martin goes against his mother's wishes in 2006 and rekindles a romance with his adulterous ex-wife Sonia, Pauline cuts him out of her life. Television personality Paul O'Grady addressed Pauline's refusal to "share her son like a normal mother", commenting, "she's suspicious of anybody that comes into the family who wants to take her son away from her. She has already lost one son; she has lost her husband, so she's hanging onto the last [son] like a mother tiger with her cub."

=== Friends and enemies ===
The character's narrative also included various feuds, most notably with the soap's lothario Den Watts, a family-friend who gets Pauline's daughter Michelle pregnant at the age of 16. EastEnders pulled in the biggest television audience of the 1980s when over 30 million people watched the 1986 Christmas Day episode in which Pauline discovers that Den is the father of her granddaughter, Vicki. Wendy Richard has commented on the hostility between the characters "once Pauline realised that Dennis was Vicki's father, she was out to get him one way or another" and actor Leslie Grantham, who played Den, added "from then on it was out and out war, which was great!" An array of confrontations between Den and Pauline occur, as she tries to force him to leave Walford and keep him away from her family. The feud appears to end in 1989 when the character Den is shot and presumed dead, but it is ignited once again in 2003 when Den is re-introduced, 14 years after he supposedly died. 2005 saw Den killed off for the final time, and although Pauline is not directly responsible for killing him, the item used to bludgeon him to death turns out to be her dog-shaped iron doorstop, which has been described as "a nice touch of pathos".

A large proportion of the character's scenes take place on the set of Walford's launderette, where Pauline works as an assistant for almost the entire duration of her time in EastEnders. Here, Pauline is frequently featured with another long-running protagonist, fellow launderette colleague, Dot Cotton. The two characters share one of the soap's most enduring screen friendships and their scenes together are often used to provide humour. Particular emphasis is placed on their differences, which lead to numerous petty squabbles and in 2004 sees them "buried alive" underneath a collapsed fairground ride, in the midst of a cake-selling war. However, Pauline and Dot are most frequently shown gossiping, reminiscing about the past, or sharing their woes in the launderette. The duo has been described by television personality Paul O'Grady as a "fabulous double-act": "Dot's probably Pauline's one and only confidant. Pauline eventually will break down and tell Dot things that she'd never tell anybody else."

Pauline is shown to be particularly hostile to the various female characters that feature in her sons' lives, and she epitomises the archetypal "mother-in-law from hell". One of Pauline's most notable feuds is with her youngest son Martin's wife, Sonia. Animosity between the characters begins in 2000, when Sonia gives birth to Pauline's grandchild and decides to give the baby Chloe (later renamed Rebecca) up for adoption. In the storyline, Pauline tries unsuccessfully to fight for custody, leading Sonia to retort "YOU want to bring up Chloe? You couldn't bring up phlegm!" The feuding over Chloe is revisited in storylines throughout 2005 and 2006, when first Pauline is shown to visit her adopted granddaughter against Sonia and Martin's wishes, and then, following Sonia's affair with Naomi Julien, Pauline refuses to give Sonia access to the child after Martin regains custody. Critic for The Guardian, Grace Dent, commented "At one point, you couldn't move around Walford for hitmen and gangsters, but now they've all been written out ... leaving Pauline Fowler to reign the square like sodding Pablo Escobar in a sky-blue tabard and ski-pants, decreeing who can see their own kids, who can drink where and what everyone's eating in the cafe so as they won't spoil their teas. If I was Sonia, I'd have ransacked the hospital's dangerous drugs box by now and given that old crone a renal meltdown." Various rows, slaps and insults were featured between the characters, caused by Pauline's continuous interference in Sonia's relationships with Martin and Rebecca. As Martin began to cede, allowing Sonia access to their daughter, Pauline was shown to concoct ever more elaborate ways to obstruct Sonia's involvement.

During her latter years in EastEnders, Pauline is rarely without her Cairn Terrier, Betty. The dog is a stray taken in by the Fowler family in 2004, who quickly becomes Pauline's inseparable sidekick. Wendy Richard has since revealed that it was her decision for Pauline to own a Cairn: "When EastEnders asked if Pauline should have a dog I said it had to be a Cairn Terrier—and Betty joined us! She's wonderful, she loves me and I love her." In the on-screen story, the dog is named after Pauline's aunt Betty, but in reality, Wendy Richard named her after Mollie Sugden's fictional character Betty Slocombe, who appeared along with Richard's Shirley Brahms in the sitcom, Are You Being Served?

=== Second marriage ===
Several eligible bachelors are shown to express their interest in Pauline over the years, including the characters Derek Taylor in 1987, Danny Taurus in 1993, Jeff Healy (who proposes) in 1999, Eddie Skinner in 2000, and Terry Raymond, with whom she goes on a blind date in 2001. However, the character remains staunchly faithful to her late husband's memory, refusing to let the relationships progress beyond companionship. In 2001 Derek Harkinson (Ian Lavender) is introduced, an old school friend of Pauline's. Initial scripts indicated that Derek was being groomed as a romantic interest for Pauline, which she is shown to welcome. However, the storyline takes a twist when he reveals, to her shock, that he is gay. 2002 sees Derek move in with the Fowler family, unconventionally settling into the show as a replacement father figure for Mark and Martin and as Pauline's best friend.

In 2005, Pauline embarks on a romance with a new character, Joe Macer (Ray Brooks), whom she meets at salsa classes. A relationship develops, and despite her initial trepidation, Pauline remarries in 2006, after almost a decade alone. Pauline's marriage to Joe was an attempt to give the character a "new lease of life", and her wedding day was screened to coincide with EastEnders' 21st anniversary. Richard was openly opposed to her character remarrying, but she was eventually convinced by the executive producer and battled, successfully, for Pauline to keep the "Fowler" surname. However, in July 2006, Wendy Richard announced that she was leaving EastEnders. Richard felt that she did not have the same chemistry with Ray Brooks, who played Joe, as she did with Bill Treacher, who played Arthur. She refuted producers' opinions that Pauline and Joe "looked good together" and felt that she and Brooks had to work very hard to turn them into a "realistic-looking couple."

Within the storyline, just two months after the wedding, Pauline's marriage is shown to sour after she discovers Joe's criminal past. Their relationship steadily deteriorates throughout the year, and in December 2006 Pauline ends the marriage—removing her wedding ring and informing Joe that he "was half the man that Arthur had been, that she had never really loved him and that their sex life was a sham." The resulting row sees Joe insult Pauline's family—suggesting that her "perfect marriage" with Arthur was "nothing but a fantasy" and branding Mark "diseased", Michelle a "scrubber" and Arthur a "con"—to which Pauline responds by smashing a plate over his head. Wendy Richard commented, "It was not just the memory of Arthur that stopped the marriage to Joe being a success. He was proven to be a weak and untruthful man. That is what caused the marriage to be a non-starter. Pauline was not mean to Joe, he used her ... and lied to her."

=== Deception, reclusiveness and death ===
Pauline Fowler's death shortly after an argument with Sonia Fowler

Viewers saw the slow build-up to Pauline's climactic exit throughout the latter part of 2006. The character's bitter decline involves depression, pretending to have a brain tumour to scupper the revived relationship between her son Martin and his ex-wife Sonia, marital breakdown, and finally ostracism after Martin and the rest of Albert Square discover her lie. Having successfully alienated everyone around her, Pauline plans to go to America to join her daughter. Wendy Richard commented on the reasons behind Pauline's actions: "she cannot forgive. For anyone to hurt a member of her family so badly is incomprehensible to Pauline. She is a good, but unforgiving woman. Sonia is more than just a thorn in Pauline's side. She is angry because she feels Martin has let her down in returning to Sonia. She feels he could have discussed it with her more and talked her round for the sake of Rebecca. Pauline will blame her decision to leave on Sonia—another way of punishing Martin. Even though she is really hurting over leaving Rebecca, Pauline is determined to go. She realised she never really loved Joe, he has lied to her too many times ... Although I know Pauline better than anyone, even I cannot fathom out why she made up the brain tumour story."

The character was killed off in a dramatic storyline, which aired on Christmas Day 2006 and was watched by an estimated 10.7 million viewers. The episode sees Sonia denouncing Pauline as "sick" for not wanting to share her son with the woman he loved, to which Pauline retorts, "I'll tell you what's sick. You. Daughter of a scrubber, lesbian, under-age mother who gave away her own baby." The row culminates with Sonia slapping Pauline, causing her to fall to the floor and break the Fowler fruit bowl—"the enduring symbol of her family, which smashed, significantly, into smithereens." Though Pauline resolves to stay and reunite with her family in the end, she does not get the chance, as she collapses and dies in the middle of Albert Square, seemingly due to her fall.

The Christmas Day episodes, written by Simon Ashdown, drew on the show's early history to mark the occasion of Pauline's exit, which was particularly emphasised by the use of flashback vocal snippets of several members of Pauline's deceased family. The critic for The Times, Tim Teeman, commented that "Wendy Richard as Pauline had the air of the departing diva, queen of all she had loved, lost and laid waste to, her face set in a silent snarl." In addition, her parting scene with the other EastEnders long-serving "grand dame" Dot Cotton (played by June Brown) has also been praised, with Teeman commenting: "The really choking scene came in the launderette between Pauline and Dot ... Here the two grand dames had worked, bitched and consoled for years. Richard and the wonderful June Brown played their final encounter as intensely as the characters deserved."

Richard herself has been less complimentary about her alter ego's departure. She has spoken of her disappointment regarding Pauline's "changing character" and "depressing final storyline". In an interview with the Biography Channel she explained: "I did say, promise me you won't make Pauline nasty before she goes, and unfortunately they did ... I wasn't too happy with the way it was done. They were changing Pauline's character ... Pauline would never have remarried. She would have remained a widow, sitting in that chair in the corner. That's what [show creator] Julia Smith wanted, and that's what I felt was right, so I resigned ... I think it's a shame because the Fowlers have gone completely now ... There was so much history with that family."

As a final tribute to Pauline and Wendy Richard, the BBC aired a special television programme, EastEnders Revealed: Goodbye Pauline, which provided an emotional look back at Pauline's pivotal storylines during her time in Walford. It also reunited Wendy Richard with prior cast-mates Todd Carty and James Alexandrou (Mark and Martin respectively), and featured character commentary and tributes from television critics and EastEnders actors such as Anna Wing and Pam St Clement (Lou and Pat). During the programme—which aired on New Year's Day, 2007—Wendy Richard reflected upon how "proud" she was of her character, commenting: "Pauline had everything in life thrown at her and I think she coped with it very well. It showed how people deal with their problems ... She wasn't always grumpy ... she did have lots of laughs, but sadly people don't seem to remember that, which is a shame ... they still harp on about her wearing her cardigans and Pauline stopped wearing cardigans three years after EastEnders started. She is a good woman, she's a kind woman, a loving woman and all she ever thought about was her family. That was the most important thing in her life."

The storyline continued into 2007, as first Pauline's funeral is interrupted by the police in order to perform an autopsy on her body, and then Pauline's nemesis Sonia is arrested for the murder. It is later revealed that the killing blow had actually come from Pauline's husband Joe, who breaks down and confesses to Dot that he had rowed with Pauline on Christmas Day (off-screen) and, in a fury, struck her across the head with a frying pan, causing a brain haemorrhage that claimed her life. The plot's eventual climax in February 2007 led to the exits of several established characters connected with Pauline. This included Martin, Sonia, and Joe, who is dramatically killed off after confessing to Pauline's murder, by falling out of the Fowlers' first floor window while trying to apprehend a hysterical Dot. Pauline is cremated, and her ashes buried at Arthur's graveside, by Dot, in an episode that aired in June 2007.

On 11 February 2025, to coincide with the show's 40th anniversary, Pauline was featured for one episode alongside Arthur in archive footage; both characters were credited.

== Reception ==
At the time of her departure from the serial, Pauline was the second-longest running character to feature in EastEnders and one of only two original characters to remain in the show for almost 22 years. Her baggy woolly cardigan and long-suffering nature have led to her being labelled as a soap institution, a "soap legend" and a "television icon". Actress Wendy Richard was awarded an Order of the British Empire MBE medal in 2000 by Queen Elizabeth II at Buckingham Palace, and when the Queen visited the set of EastEnders in 2001, Wendy Richard was the first actress introduced, who then accompanied her and Prince Philip on their tour of the set.

Despite being popular with many, the character of Pauline has also garnered much criticism over the years. Persistent criticism has been given to the character's dowdy attire, particularly the perception that she rarely wears anything but a baggy cardigan; a claim that Wendy Richard herself categorically disputes. In addition, Pauline has also received much criticism for her miserable demeanour—"a face like a month of wet weekends" and "a voice that could curdle milk." She has been described as the "Wicked Witch of Walford" and "a character who became a byword for downtrodden haggery."

Lucy Mangan, the culture critic from The Guardian newspaper, summed up the character: "Pauline Fowler is surely one of the oddest soap creations ever. She is a character without humour, charisma or indeed any redeeming features who became progressively, unrelentingly miserable ... She was presumably intended to be the anchoring force for EastEnders, but because of the writers' unprecedented decision to break with traditional narrative rules and give her not a single redeeming feature, she became more of a sucking chest wound than the heart of the show." This opinion is perhaps shared by a proportion of viewers, as Pauline was voted the 35th most annoying person of 2006 in a BBC Three poll, being the only fictional character to appear on the list. In a Radio Times poll of over 5,000 people in 2004, 13% chose Pauline Fowler as the soap character they would most like to see retired. She came third in the poll, behind EastEnders' Den Watts (17%) and Coronation Street's Ken Barlow (15%).

Although it had been suggested that Pauline's presence in EastEnders was largely peripheral for some time, the news of her departure in 2006 was met with dismay by fans and soap journalists alike. In a report for BBC News, one viewer commented "it's so sad, because I've watched her for 20 years. She's such a large character", and another said "If she goes then I think EastEnders is finished." BBC controller of continuing drama, John Yorke, commented Richard "occupies a huge place in people's hearts", and executive producer Kate Harwood said, "For many years Wendy simply was EastEnders for the audience and Pauline's indomitable nature typified the grit and fight that embodies the EastEnders' spirit ... We thank her for everything she has done for the show."

Inside Soap editor, Steven Murphy, said that the fact Pauline has been such an "enduring staple" will make it hard for fans to cope with her departure. "It's huge in soap terms ... She's a character people love to hate—you just assumed she would be there forever." When addressing the repercussions that Pauline's exit would have on the soap, Murphy had this to say: "characters like Pauline are like glue, because they're connected to so many other characters and they can help hold stories together. In terms of that [EastEnders] has very few of those now." Jonathan Hughes, editor of All About Soap magazine, added "[Pauline's] an absolute legend ... You can't imagine the show without her ... People will miss her because she's been such an important part of EastEnders for so many years." However, not all viewers were sorry to hear of the character's retirement, with one commenting "How can you have someone like Pauline Fowler on the television for 21 years? It's the best thing that's ever happened to television [getting rid of her]. Kill her off? I would have blown her up years ago".

"[Pauline] wasn't just a character, she was very much the social glue of the Square."

— BBC News reporting on Pauline's exit (2006).

Pauline's exit in December 2006 was described by The Times critic, Tim Teeman, as a landmark episode and a "significant sayonara". He described scenes between Pauline and Dot as "the most moving in a soap this year" and added that "it was a delight to finally alight on an episode ... that was so satisfying." Conversely, Pauline's exit was described as a "mess" by Kevin O'Sullivan, critic of the Sunday Mirror newspaper. He branded the character's final scene unconvincing and badly acted, commenting: "the appropriately feeble scene brought down the curtain on 20 terrible years of Wendy Richard's low-quality performances. We shall not see her like again. If we're lucky! ... I'm certain millions didn't tune in to say farewell to sour-faced Pauline. No, they were just checking to make sure she was really dead."

To mark Pauline's 22-year reign in EastEnders, Wendy Richard was awarded with a 'Lifetime Achievement' award at The British Soap Awards in May 2007. The award was presented by Todd Carty, who played her on-screen son Mark. Carty described Richard as the "heart and soul of EastEnders" and hailed her as an inspiration to everyone in the EastEnders cast. Richard was moved to tears when she collected the award.

== In popular culture and other media ==
When the series was launching in 1985, since Wendy Richard was the most recognisable actor from the original cast, she and her character Pauline were used heavily to promote EastEnders in the media. Wendy Richard, in character as Pauline, was chosen to narrate a special "dial-a-soap" service for EastEnders. Run by British Telecom, the facility allowed people who had missed an episode to ring a number and get an instant update, up to 88 seconds long. It was the first television show to provide such a service. Between 1985 and 2006, Pauline was featured in much EastEnders-related merchandise and promotional material, including calendars, cast-cards, annuals, novels, a knitting pattern book and a greeting card.

The well-known character of Pauline Fowler has also been referenced in various television programmes, unrelated to the EastEnders universe. In 1997 she was mentioned in an episode of the successful BBC drama This Life. Two key characters, Anna and Ferdy, watch an episode of EastEnders on television and mock Pauline's hysterics and her well-documented tendency to wear cardigans. The character was also regularly spoofed in the BBC comedy sketch show, The Real McCoy (1991–1995). One of the show's recurring sketches featured a spoof version of EastEnders, with black comedians taking over roles of well known EastEnders characters, who frequent a pub called Rub-a-Dub. The comedian Llewella Gideon played the role of Pauline. The sketches placed considerable emphasis on the character's high-pitched voice and her tendency to whine. The character's fashion sense has also been referred to in BBC Two sitcom Beautiful People (2008).

== See also ==
- EastEnders episodes in Ireland
