= Martin Fowler (EastEnders) =

Fictional character from EastEnders

- EastEnders character
- James Bye as Martin Fowler (2024)
- Portrayed by: Jon Peyton-Price (1985–1996); James Alexandrou (1996–2007); James Bye (2014–2025)
- Duration: 1985–2007, 2014–2025
- First appearance: Episode 49; 6 August 1985
- Last appearance: Episode 7072; 20 February 2025
- Introduced by: Julia Smith (1985); Dominic Treadwell-Collins (2014)
- Spin-off appearances: The Queen Vic Quiz Night (2020)
- James Alexandrou as Martin Fowler (2007)

- Jon Peyton-Price as Martin Fowler (1993)
In-universe information
- Occupation: Student; Market trader Chip shop assistant Doorman; Barman
- Family: Fowler
- Father: Arthur Fowler
- Mother: Pauline Fowler
- Stepfather: Joe Macer
- Brothers: Mark Fowler
- Sisters: Michelle Fowler
- Wife: Sonia Jackson (2004–2006, 2007–2015); Stacey Slater (2016–2020); Ruby Allen (2020–2021)
- Sons: Roman Fowler
- Daughters: Bex Fowler; Hope Fowler
- Adoptive sons: Arthur Fowler Jnr
- Adoptive daughters: Lily Slater
- Granddaughters: Charli Slater (adoptive)
- Grandmothers: Lou Beale
- Uncles: Kenny Beale; Pete Beale
- Aunts: Maggie Flaherty
- Nephews: Mark Fowler Jnr
- Nieces: Vicki Fowler
- First cousins: Eamonn Flaherty; John Flaherty; Conor Flaherty; Elizabeth Beale; David Wicks; Ian Beale
- Other relatives: Colette Flaherty; Mary Flaherty; Peter Beale; Lucy Beale; Bobby Beale; Bianca Jackson; Liam Butcher; Tiffany Butcher; Morgan Butcher; Nellie Ellis

Martin Fowler is a fictional character from the BBC soap opera, EastEnders. The character was played by Jon Peyton-Price from Martin's introduction 1985 until 1996, by James Alexandrou from 1996 until 2007 and by James Bye from 2014 until 2025 when the character was killed off during the 40th anniversary live episode.

After Alexandrou took over the role, Martin became part of the regular cast, and was featured in prominent storylines, including having a baby at fifteen, Bex Fowler (Jade Sharif/Jasmine Armfield) with Sonia Jackson (Natalie Cassidy); developing a romantic crush on Zoe Slater (Michelle Ryan), which was not reciprocated; accidentally killing Sonia's former fiancé, Jamie Mitchell (Jack Ryder) after running him over in his car, which results in Martin being imprisoned for Jamie's death and subsequently feuding with Jamie's relative Phil Mitchell (Steve McFadden); enduring a problematic marriage with Sonia; being stalked by Sarah Cairns (Alison Pargeter); and coping with the deaths of his brother, Mark Fowler (Todd Carty), and mother, Pauline Fowler (Wendy Richard). Alexandrou quit the role in 2006, and Martin departed on 2 February 2007, leaving Walford with Bex and Sonia.

In October 2014, it was announced that executive producer Dominic Treadwell-Collins decided to reintroduce Martin, with the role being recast to James Bye; Martin returned on 5 December 2014. After his return in 2014, Martin divorced Sonia; married Stacey Slater (Lacey Turner); found out that Stacey's son Arthur Fowler is actually the son of his best friend, Kush Kazemi (Davood Ghadami); survived a bus crash; spent a two-week stint in prison for assaulting a police officer; experienced the premature birth of his daughter Hope Fowler; briefly separated from Stacey after discovering her one-night stand with her former lover Max Branning (Jake Wood); feuded with both Kush and Stacey's cousin Kat Slater (Jessie Wallace) over Arthur's custody; dealt with Bex's disappearance and attempted suicide; been blackmailed by Phil's son Ben Mitchell (Max Bowden) into committing crimes for him; ended his marriage to Stacey in an attempt to protect her and their children against the death threats made towards them by Ben; had a one-night stand with Stacey's best friend, Ruby Allen (Louisa Lytton); descended into crime; been involved in a hit-and-run accident; kidnapped Keanu Taylor (Danny Walters) and faked his death with help from Linda Carter (Kellie Bright); briefly reunited with Sonia; had a year-long marriage to Ruby; discovered that his adoptive daughter, Lily Slater (Lillia Turner), is pregnant at the age of twelve; learnt that Ruby had secretly had his son, Roman Allen; led a campaign against the Market's closure; and briefly reconciled with Stacey during the show's 40th anniversary episodes before dying from crush injuries sustained after an explosion at The Queen Vic.

Martin was absent for two months, between 2 August and 4 October 2019, as part of Stacey's temporary exit storyline. Martin again departed on 22 January 2024, after Bye took a break from the show, before returning on 18 March. Bye departed the serial on 20 February 2025 during the 40th anniversary live episode after he died to cardiac arrest.

== Creation and development ==
=== Introduction (1985) ===
In the first episode, it is revealed that Pauline Fowler (Wendy Richard), aged 40, is pregnant with her third child. The character's pregnancy quickly became a prominent storyline within the series. Pauline, ignoring her mother Lou Beale (Anna Wing)'s protests, is determined to keep the baby. The storyline was used to spread a public message on the increased risk of genetic defects in late pregnancies, with Pauline undergoing amniocentesis tests. The storyline culminates with the birth of the serial's first baby, Martin, in July 1985.

=== Characterisation ===
Martin started out as a "quiet child", but later grew into a "hooligan" who was always getting into trouble. In spite of his special status as baby of the Fowler family, Martin wasn't cushioned from the harsh realities of life. He grew up in the shadow of his father, Arthur Fowler's (Bill Treacher) mental breakdown and imprisonment, his parents' temporary separation, the premature death of his father and later his brother's death from an AIDS related illness. Indeed, it was Arthur's death that sent Martin over the edge, taking him down the path of petty crime.

=== Departure (2007) ===
On 15 April 2006, it was reported that Alexandrou had decided to leave EastEnders. Speaking of his decision, Alexandrou said, "I've decided to leave the show to experience other aspects of my industry. Having just turned 21, I feel it is an appropriate time to leave." A spokesperson for the BBC said, "James has been a fantastic member of the cast and he goes with our best wishes." Another said, "James has been a much loved cast member for the last 10 years. We'll miss him greatly but wish him all the best for the future." Alexandrou also reported that he would like to return to EastEnders at some point in the future. "I owe everything to the show" he said, "I would love to come back one day, that is, if EastEnders will have me." Producers reported that the door would be left open for his return. It was initially reported that Martin would remain on the show until August 2007; however, the character departed in February 2007 to tie in with his wife Sonia Fowler's (Natalie Cassidy) exit.

=== Return and recast (2014) ===
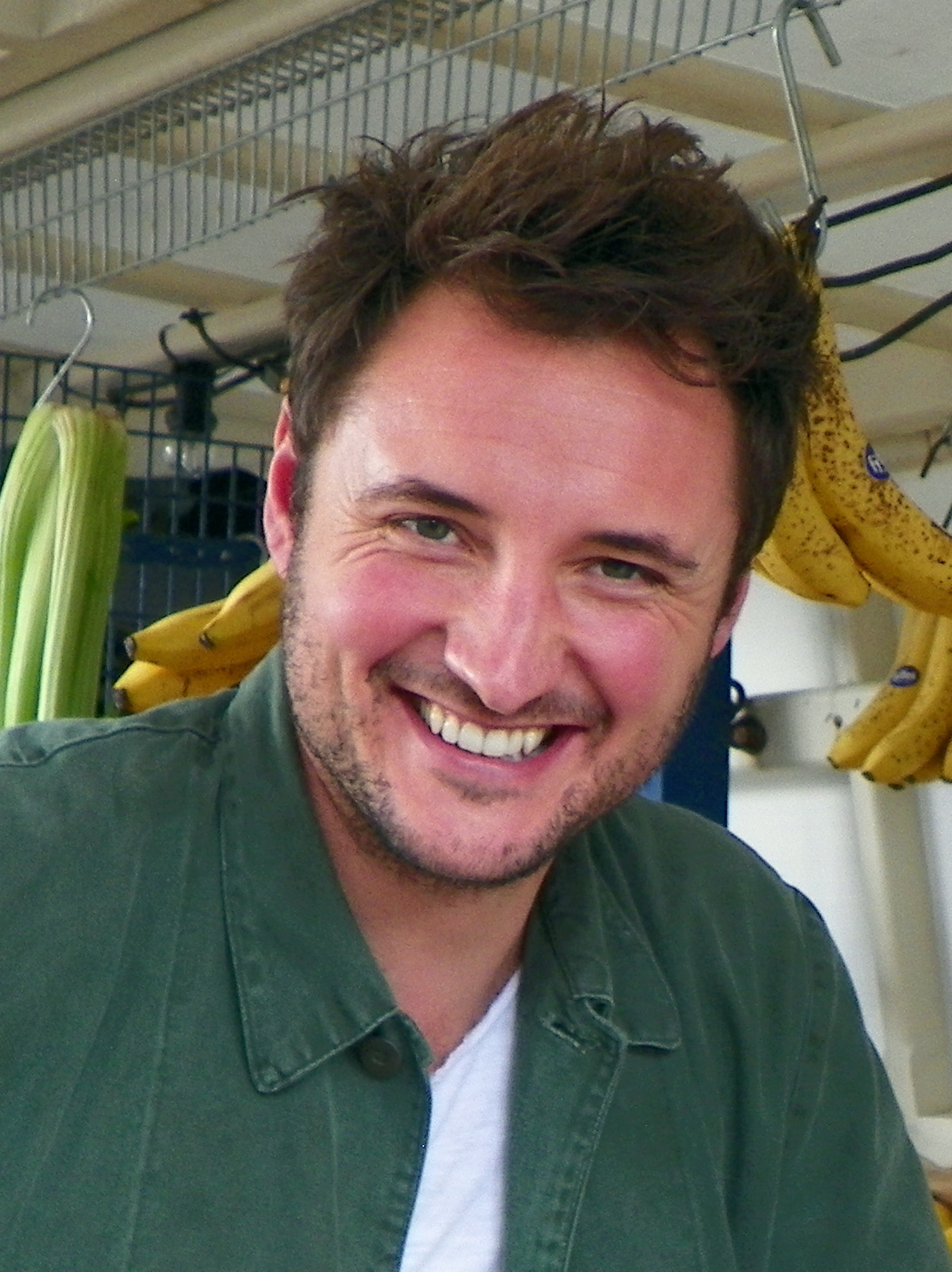
James Bye (pictured) was the third actor to portray Martin.

On 12 October 2014, it was announced that James Bye has taken over the role. Executive producer Dominic Treadwell-Collins explained that the recast took place with Alexandrou's blessing. He also said, "Our casting executive Julia Crampsie has found a genuine relatable London bloke in the talented James Bye—we are sure that viewers old and new will soon warm to Martin Fowler's charms as he returns home to Walford." Lee Ryan also auditioned for the role of Martin in 2014 and read for the role with Lacey Turner, who portrays Martin's love interest Stacey Slater.

=== Departure and death (2025) ===
During EastEnders 40th Anniversary Week episode on 20 February 2025, Martin was killed after being crushed by a fallen structural beam and confessing his love for Stacey Slater. The character went into cardiac arrest and died. Afterwards, it was revealed that Bye had quit the show.

== Storylines ==
=== 1985–2007 ===
When Pauline and Arthur tell Pauline's mother, Lou Beale (Anna Wing) that Pauline is pregnant, Lou is furious because they have two teenage children, Mark Fowler (David Scarboro) and Michelle Fowler (Susan Tully), and Arthur is unemployed. Lou gives them the choice of either giving the child up for adoption, having an abortion or the family moving out of her home, but she is won round when the family organise a holiday for her to Clacton. The baby's first christening is postponed when he is diagnosed with gastroenteritis and Lou is delighted when he is finally christened Martin Albert Fowler. When Pauline discovers Arthur had an affair with Christine Hewitt (Elizabeth Power), she bans Arthur from seeing Martin, but they eventually reconcile.

Arthur dies suddenly in May 1996, when Martin is still only 10 years old. Martin then befriends a small gang of young criminals from his local school. He takes part in a series of petty thefts, burglaries and vandalism that culminates in him being arrested. Martin is placed under the supervision of a social worker.

Martin has a brief relationship with Nicky di Marco (Carly Hillman) in his early teens, but she refuses to have sex with him. Martin turns to Sonia Jackson (Natalie Cassidy) after Nicky dumps him. Sonia is feeling vulnerable after being dumped by Enrico di Clemente (Francis Pandolfo), and after getting drunk, they lose their virginities to each other; she becomes pregnant, but they are both completely unaware of the pregnancy until she goes into childbirth.

Sonia gives birth to daughter, Chloe Jackson and she decides to give Chloe up for adoption. When she names Martin as the father, a feud erupts between the Jacksons and the Fowlers, with Pauline demanding custody of the baby instead of her being adopted. This leads to a court hearing where Sonia asks that baby Chloe be returned to her and she will raise her with her boyfriend, Jamie Mitchell (Jack Ryder), if Martin asks for custody with Pauline to support him. However, the judge rules that the adoption should go ahead when Martin admits that he does not want to be a father. Martin continues to go off the rails in December 2000 when he takes drugs provided by Nick Cotton (John Altman), which leads to Martin's brother Mark (now Todd Carty) taking revenge and leaving Nick temporarily paralysed, spiking his drink and luring him onto the viaduct, from which he falls.

Martin receives a six-month prison sentence in February 2003 after driving the car that hit Jamie, causing his death. However, he only serves two months, being let out early for good behaviour. Once released, Martin resumes his criminal lifestyle by robbing a shop, blackmailing Kareena Ferreira (Pooja Shah) and growing cannabis in his late father's shed, assisted by his best friend, Asif Malik (Ashvin Luximon). This leads to family friend Derek Harkinson (Ian Lavender) taking the blame when the police find out, as Martin cannot risk trouble with the law, due to his previous convictions. It is not until Martin is confronted and forgiven by a bereaved Sonia that he finally begins to feel remorse for his actions and attempts to reform himself.

After a few brief relationships, including a one-night stand with Kelly Taylor (Brooke Kinsella), Martin begins growing close to Sonia, and they fall in love. After Sonia helps him come to terms with the death of his brother in 2004, Martin decides to propose marriage. Amidst constant interference from Pauline, Martin and Sonia decide to elope. The newlyweds move in with Pauline but she puts constant strain on their marriage with her meddling. Several months later, Martin unwittingly puts his marriage in jeopardy when he encounters Sarah Cairns (Alison Pargeter). After passing out drunk at Sarah's house, she claims that Martin slept with her and begins stalking him. When Martin physically threatens her, she calls the police and has him arrested before revealing their "affair" to Sonia. Sarah's plan is thwarted, however, as Sonia refuses to leave her husband. After admitting that their affair is a lie, Sarah stabs Martin with a kitchen knife but Sonia hits her over the head with Pauline's fruit bowl. Sarah is committed to a mental institution and Martin and Sonia put the incident behind them.

Pauline's influence over Martin starts putting a strain on his marriage. Things worsen when Sonia finds out that Martin and Pauline have been visiting her and Martin's daughter (now named Rebecca) against her wishes. Their marriage breaks down, due to Sonia's affair with a fellow student, Naomi Julien (Petra Letang). Martin is devastated but she soon regrets it when Martin is given custody of their daughter following the death of her adoptive parents and they frequently exclude her from Rebecca's life. Martin tries to move on by dating Carly Wicks (Kellie Shirley) briefly, stirring up some jealousy in Sonia. Immediately after they divorce, they begin to regret it and sleep together. They then secretly reunite and hope to keep it from Pauline but she eventually finds out and they argue. Pauline prepares to leave but the house catches fire, and Martin saves her. Pauline then claims that she is dying from a brain tumour. In fact, she is faking it to make sure that Martin ends his relationship with Sonia, which he eventually does. However, Martin is stunned when it is revealed that Pauline has been lying.

When Martin discovers that his mother is leaving for the United States on Christmas Day, he tries to persuade her to stay, but her decision is final. On Christmas Day, Martin proposes to Sonia again and she accepts, but later that day he discovers his mother's dead body in the Square. Martin believes Joe murdered her, but Sonia confesses that she is responsible, as she had hit her earlier. After they fight, the police arrive and Sonia is arrested on suspicion of murder. She is released and he forbids her to see Rebecca. Pauline's post-mortem results are announced and Martin is told that Pauline's death was caused by a severe blow to the head. Sonia goes on the run with Rebecca, leaving Martin devastated. He tries to find them to no avail and when he hears Phil Mitchell helped Sonia and Rebecca escape, he kidnaps Phil's son Ben (Charlie Jones) and holds him on the rail bridge. Phil manages to convince Martin to let Ben go. Sonia and Rebecca soon return and Martin calls the police to arrest her. It is later revealed that Joe killed Pauline. When Pauline's will is read, she gives Martin possession of the house but only if he does not live with Sonia. Martin and Sonia reunite anyway and they, Rebecca and Pauline's dog, Betty, leave Walford together. It is later revealed they are touring the US, staying with Martin's sister, Michelle.

Sonia returns to Walford alone for her sister Bianca Jackson's (Patsy Palmer) wedding. Initially, Sonia says that Martin and Rebecca are fine, but then tells her mother Carol Jackson (Lindsey Coulson) that she and Martin are having problems in their marriage. Sonia reveals that she and Rebecca are living in Dagenham and that Martin now has a new girlfriend in Manchester. Sonia returns to Walford and admits that she and Martin still have marital problems. In this time, she also attempted to sleep with Phil Mitchell (Steve McFadden).

=== 2014–2025 ===
Martin returns to Walford to support Sonia on the evening of her Fat Blasters' Christmas party, but arrives late and discovers she has collapsed due to complications with a gastric band she got in Bulgaria. Sonia tells Martin that she had the operation as she felt he was not attracted to her any longer and he later recognises that they do not love each other and they separate, with Martin returning to Dagenham. Martin returns to Walford for the wedding of his cousin Ian Beale (Adam Woodyatt). He, Stacey Slater (Lacey Turner) and Kush Kazemi (Davood Ghadami) discover Nick's dead body at number 23 (recreating the first ever scene of EastEnders). After agreeing not to speak of the matter, they discover that Nick's mother Dot Branning (June Brown) has called the police and confessed that she has killed him. After walking Stacey home, he tries to kiss her but she rejects him. He later returns while Ian and his wife Jane Beale (Laurie Brett) are on their honeymoon, staying at their house and catches Cindy Williams (Mimi Keene) having sex with Liam Butcher (James Forde) and decides to keep an eye on her. He manages to convince his and Sonia's daughter, now calling herself Bex (now Jasmine Armfield) to come to Walford, where she reveals her new look as a Goth. He also attends Donna Yates' (Lisa Hammond) birthday party with Kush and their friends from football. He tries to kiss Donna for a bet but ends up getting into a fight with Fatboy (Ricky Norwood). He also confides in Kush that he thinks he and Sonia could get their marriage back on track but then spots Sonia kissing her new girlfriend, Tina Carter (Luisa Bradshaw-White). He later argues with Sonia in The Queen Vic after revealing the truth about her and Tina and tells Bex that Sonia is a lesbian, making her reject Sonia. After Martin and Sonia have a meaningful conversation about their relationship, he sends Bex to live with Sonia. It is later revealed that Martin is homeless and sleeping in the back of his van. Alfie Moon (Shane Richie) tells Ian of Martin's troubles and Martin moves in with Ian and later tells Sonia that he has lost their house in Dagenham. After filing for divorce, Martin rents a flat with Stacey and her daughter Lily Slater (Aine Garvey) and they start dating, which gets serious despite Stacey's lingering feelings for Kush. Their relationship progresses as Martin and Sonia's divorce comes through and Martin researches bipolar disorder.

When Martin finds out that Stacey is pregnant, he initially wants her to book a termination but later supports her decision to keep the baby. She discovers he is planning to propose and says she does not want to marry again, so he proposes a commitment without marriage, and she accepts. Stacey is electrocuted by a faulty socket that Lee Carter (Danny Hatchard) failed to repair properly so Martin punches him and threatens to kill him if the baby dies as a result. At the hospital, Martin finds out she is okay and the baby is a boy. When Stacey is discharged, Martin announces to everyone in The Queen Vic that the baby is a boy and invites Lee and Whitney to join him, Stacey, Kush, and Shabnam Masood (Rakhee Thakrar) for lunch. He apologises for hitting Lee and forgives him for the incident. Shabnam discovers that Martin is not the father of Stacey's baby, but she and Kush decide not to tell Martin. When Stacey's son is born on Christmas Eve, Martin names him Arthur Fowler, after his father. Two weeks later, Stacey’s cousin Kat Slater (Jessie Wallace) discovers that Martin is not Arthur's father and when Stacey and Arthur go missing, Martin and Kush grow concerned and try to find her. Martin eventually finds Stacey on the roof of The Vic. She claims that Arthur is the son of God and that God will rescue them from what she thinks are demons. Martin, believing it is a symptom of her unmedicated bipolar, goes along with her and convinces her to come home with him. On the day of Charlie's funeral, Stacey is upset that she did not get to the church so God could give her a message. She does not allow Martin near Arthur and smashes glass cups to protect them. When Stacey goes to Kush and Shabnam's for safety, Martin persuades her that she is safe with him. He takes her to hospital and after Stacey speaks to a psychologist, Martin learns that there are no mother and baby units and that Stacey will have to be sectioned. Martin breaks the news to Stacey and is later informed Stacey is suffering from postpartum psychosis. When Martin visits Stacey, he realises that she needs to see Arthur and tries to find a hospital with a mother and baby unit. Kush convinces Martin to have a night out and deliberately leaves his phone behind. When Martin returns, he discovers he missed a call about a mother and baby unit and has missed out. Martin punches Kush and they fight, leading Kush to admit that he has ruined everything. Martin travels to find another mother and baby unit the following day, taking Arthur with him while doing so. Sonia and Bex learn that Martin and Arthur were involved in a car crash on their way home.

Martin discharges himself from hospital, worried that he will miss Stacey's medical review but he has already missed it. He visits Stacey after discovering she has chosen to stay in hospital, where she says that everyone is better off without her, asking him to raise Arthur and Lily the way she wanted. He realises she feels that way because she is in hospital, and vows to break her out. Stacey refuses and the doctor tells him to go home and rest. Martin finds a mother and baby unit for Stacey in Essex and takes her and Arthur there. A nurse hands him a letter Stacey left behind and he reads it at home, discovering that Arthur is Kush's son. He visits Stacey and tells her he knows the truth. She begs for his forgiveness, but he leaves and goes to America, returning a few weeks later. He sees Kush and immediately punches him. He tells Sonia he is only collecting his belongings. When under pressure by those denouncing him for abandoning Arthur, Martin publicly reveals that Kush is Arthur's father. As Martin is about to leave for the airport, Kush promises to be a good father but assures Martin that he will always be the real father no matter what, Martin goes to the mother and baby unit and reunites with Stacey and Arthur. During Stacey's first home visit, Martin is annoyed when Stacey's half-brother Kyle Slater (Riley Carter Millington) returns but after Kyle tells Stacey he is transgender, she invites Kyle to live with them and Martin, not knowing the truth, reluctantly agrees. When Martin and Stacey reconcile, Stacey proposes to Martin and he accepts. They also tell Kush that he can be a part of Arthur's life, but Kush later says he no longer wants this.

When Kat stops paying Stacey's rent, Martin sets up his own market stall but some of his merchandise is faulty and he is forced to issue refunds, though is unable to get a refund himself. Andy Flynn (Jack Derges) assists Martin by getting him some work in Sunderland for two weeks. Martin accepts this, but when he returns, Stacey is underwhelmed with the funds he has collected; he insists more is being transferred soon. Andy later tells Martin he knows he was fired from the job and is lying to Stacey. Andy tells Stacey, so Martin explains that he was underqualified for the position. Martin asks Andy for more work, so Andy says that 40 toilets were delivered in error to the flats he is renovating and they could sell them and split the profits. Martin agrees and with Stacey and Kyle's help, they successfully steal them. When Stacey learns her cousin Belinda Peacock (Carli Norris) is trying to sell them back to Jack, Martin, Stacey, Kyle and Belinda put them back. Following Peggy Mitchell's (Barbara Windsor) death, Stacey tells Martin she cannot get married, but she changes her mind. Martin and Stacey marry at the registry office. When Sonia moves away, Bex moves in with Martin and Stacey and the family then move into Sonia's old house, but Kyle and Belinda then both move away. Later, Martin is furious when he finds out that Bex's boyfriend and Kush's younger brother, Shakil Kazemi (Shaheen Jafargholi) has ended his relationship with Bex immediately after having sex with her. He attacks Shakil in the market and announces his actions to everyone but this humiliates Bex. He apologises to Bex and Stacey and later comforts Bex.

Martin is unhappy when Stacey's former flame Max Branning (Jake Wood) returns to Walford after being wrongly accused of murdering Lucy Beale (Hetti Bywater) and he and Stacey grow close. Martin tells Stacey he is worried about Max's motives for coming back and informs her that Phil Mitchell (Steve McFadden) bribed the juror of Max's trial to find him guilty, which Stacey later tells Max. Martin discovers that the market is being moved and attempts to get the market traders to strike. A bus crashes into the market and Martin is trapped under it. He tells Stacey he loves her, presuming he will not survive, but is rescued by a group of people who lift the bus so he can be moved. At the hospital, Martin agrees to having a baby with Stacey.

Bex starts to be bullied at school when a nude photo that Shakil took of himself and sent to Bex is distributed around the school from Bex's phone, though Louise Mitchell (Tilly Keeper), Alexandra D'Costa (Sydney Craven) and Madison Drake (Seraphina Beh) are the ones who sent it. Shakil's friend Keegan Baker (Zack Morris) takes revenge by distributing a pornographic clip with Bex's face imposed on the model's body, which Martin eventually discovers. The police become involved as the video is considered an indecent image of a minor, and the photo of Shakil is discovered. Bex takes the blame for it, covering for Alexandra and Madison, who have threatened her. When Martin sees Carmel and Shakil at the school, Martin brands Shakil dirty and threatens violence against him if he ever sees him again. Martin then grounds Bex due to her actions, and refuses to let Carmel see Arthur due to Shakil's behaviour, prompting a fight between him, Kush, Carmel, and Stacey at their house. The police then arrive, and reveal the news that Bex also had topless selfies of herself on her phone, which though she had deleted and not shared, were backed up to the cloud. Martin's phone is also confiscated as a result. Devastated, he insists that Bex will not be allowed to have her phone back and that she is banned from social media. However, Bex soon becomes a victim of bullying at the hands of Alexandra and Madison. Martin soon starts to talk to Bex and reminds her about how being responsible for Jamie's death has made him the person he is now and that she should not let anyone talk negatively about her no matter the situation. Bex starts a relationship with Preston Cooper (Martin Anzor), Michelle's former teenage student from America, not knowing that Michelle is having a secret relationship with him, which is the main cause of losing contact with her own family. Bex eventually discovers their affair and publicly exposes them. A disgusted Martin disowns Michelle as a result and bans her from his life. Stacey attempts to get Martin and Michelle to reconcile but this fails. Stacey also tells Martin she is pregnant. Sonia arrives back in Walford after Bex phones her in tears due to her bullying and Bex tells her family what has happened with Madison and Alexandra. Sonia tells Martin she wants Bex to live with her, but Bex stays with Martin and Stacey.

During a Walford in Bloom event, a gas leak causes an explosion in the Square and Martin panics when he cannot find Stacey. He attempts to push past a police officer but when they try and hold him back, Martin pushes one over, resulting in him getting arrested just as it is revealed that Stacey is safe. Martin receives a four-week sentence, two weeks of which he must spend in prison. When Stacey visits him in prison, she is horrified to find that Martin has bruises on his torso, as a result of bullying. While Martin is in prison, Stacey discovers that Arthur is at high risk of having Brugada syndrome, a heart condition inherited from Kush. This results in Stacey being disorganised and short-tempered. Martin returns home to find Stacey arguing with Carmel after the former has hurt Lily. Martin is worried when Stacey tells him about Arthur's health risk. When he sees what this is doing to Stacey, he confides in Michelle that their unborn baby could be the biggest mistake of their lives. Stacey overhears and angrily tells Martin to leave if he is not able to love Arthur and Lily and their unborn child the same. However, Martin assures Stacey that he will love all their kids equally. Martin, Kush, Carmel and Stacey are agitated when Arthur has to be hospitalised when Bex finds him in a lifeless state. Carmel is alarmed to find that Arthur fainted due to consuming Stacey's bipolar pills. She is horrified to discover that Arthur has bruises on his arm, although this is from other kids yanking him at the hospital. Lily tells Carmel that Stacey caused Arthur's bruises, prompting Carmel to inform Social Services. However, Carmel soon realises her mistake. After an unsuccessful attempt from Carmel at resting the issue, Social Services turn up at Martin and Stacey's house and inform them that Lily and Arthur need to be removed for the night, leaving Martin and Stacey heart-broken. The couple eventually get Arthur back, but Stacey is enraged when Carmel admits that she phoned Social Services, and in the altercation that follows, Stacey suffers an eclamptic seizure which leads to the premature birth of their daughter, Hope.

When Max is rejected by the community for conning people out of their businesses for the redevelopment of the Square, Stacey is one of the few people that offers him support. She invites him to stay in their house, much to Martin's displeasure. His insecurity leads to him telling Stacey that Max is not welcome in the house. On Christmas Eve, Stacey and Max have sex. When Stacey sees Max's daughters, Lauren (Jacqueline Jossa) and Abi Branning (Lorna Fitzgerald), fall from The Vic roof, she is instantly reminded of her former husband Bradley Branning's (Charlie Clements) death. Martin tries to calm her down, and though he suspects something happened between Stacey and Max, he tells Stacey they should carry on as normal. However, Stacey says that if they do not talk, their relationship cannot survive, so she admits to having sex with Max, later explaining that she did so as she and Martin never have time for themselves and she is left to manage the house. Martin refuses to talk to Stacey about it so it does not ruin Christmas for their children and that he will not accept blame for her actions, saying she should leave if it is going to destroy their family. However, Martin later decides to make up with Stacey after speaking to Ted Murray (Christopher Timothy), but finds the house empty and a goodbye note from Stacey, saying she is leaving Walford with Lily, Arthur and Hope to stay with her mother Jean Walters (Gillian Wright). A dejected Martin ends up spending New Year's Eve alone in his house and the next day, confronts Max about sleeping with Stacey but declines to punch him, saying revenge does not help. However, Martin later punches Max but admits that he still does not feel right about it and that he only did it for Carmel, whom Max also used and slept with. Stacey returns a few weeks later and when Stacey is out, Martin accuses her of being with Max when it turns out she is not with Whitney. Stacey and Martin argue and when Martin suggests Stacey was with Max due to Abi's death, she slaps him. Stacey thinks the marriage is broken and tells Martin he should move out, accusing him of hurting her; he is hurt Stacey does not regard Lily and Arthur as his children, but he angrily throws her out and exposes her affair with Max. Martin keeps the children inside, away from Stacey, though the pair support each other briefly when Lily holds Hope by the upstairs window, asking for Stacey. Martin rejects Stacey when she says the children need her and he decides he will not let Stacey near the children. Martin decides to go for custody and when Kush finds out, he urges Stacey and Martin to resolve their problems, but he has a turn. Martin meets with Stacey to attempt to fix their marriage, but Martin decides to give up. He offers Stacey contact and Stacey contacts Ryan to help her; however, she decides to call Whitney and asking her help. Whitney lets Stacey into the house and a locksmith changes the locks, devastating Martin. Martin is not happy when Stacey seemingly changes her mind about Martin looking after the children for the night, but he refuses to look after Hope when Stacey offers as he suspects she will see Max.

A woman named Hayley (Katie Jarvis) takes photos of Martin and Stacey and her neighbour Arshad Ahmed (Madhav Sharma) stops Stacey from taking her children to Brighton when she argues with Martin, but Martin finds out from Jean that Stacey had not planned to go to Brighton. Martin and Stacey take Arthur out to see a show to sort out access and Martin is annoyed that Stacey has invited Kush, deciding that it has to be that way and Martin decides to file for divorce, despite Kush figuring out that Stacey may have enjoyed herself with Martin without his presence. Stacey arranges a childcare rota as an apology to Martin, but after sending an email to his solicitor to file for divorce, Martin attempts to delete his solicitor's email to Stacey, but Stacey seemingly accepts his apology, though later she contacts someone and decides to involve her solicitor. Stacey is devastated when her grandmother Mo Harris (Laila Morse) returns to Walford with the news Kat is dead and Martin sets up a crowdfunding page for Kat's funeral as Stacey cannot afford it. Stacey thanks Martin and kisses him, which then turns to passion between them. Martin and Stacey secretly reignite their relationship for months, and they later become an official couple again. Martin is upset when Bex goes missing and clashes with Stuart Highway (Ricky Champ) when he believes that he is responsible for Bex's disappearance, though she is later found. In June 2019, Martin is angry when Kush decides that he wants to file for joint custody over Arthur, causing the end of their friendship, though they later make amends. When Kat is threatened by Phil, Martin defends her, resulting in Phil suffocating Martin with a metal pole. Stacey then hits Phil with a wrench and fearing that she has killed him, Stacey decides to flee Walford to escape imprisonment. Martin joins her and they depart together with Hope and Lily in the back of a taxi.

Martin returns in October 2019, after being contacted by Sonia when Bex attempts suicide by overdosing on pills. He decides to stay and pleads with Phil's son Ben Mitchell (Max Bowden) to let Stacey return to Walford. Ben agrees only if Martin assists him in rescuing Lola Pearce (Danielle Harold) when she is kidnapped by both Kheerat (Jaz Deol) and Jags Panesar (Amar Adatia), who Ben owes money to. Martin agrees, but is furious but when Ben threatens to hand the wrench used by Stacey to the police, in order for Martin to continue assisting him in illegal activities. Martin is relieved when Ben disposes the wrench but is further blackmailed when Ben shows Martin a video of him stealing a car. Martin lashes out at Ben and reminds him about dangling him from a railway bridge. Martin turns to Jack Branning (Scott Maslen) and Ben is arrested. However, Ben is released and tricks Martin into believing that he will allow Stacey to return, and then has Martin kidnapped and dangled from the same railway bridge that Martin hung Ben over. Ben threatens Martin that he will hurt Stacey and his children if he does not continue working for him. Martin is forced to comply with Ben's wishes and ends his marriage with Stacey to ensure that she stays away from Walford. Not long after, Stacey files for a divorce, leaving Martin devastated. In December 2019, Martin and Ben's associate Charlie "Tubbs" Savage (Tayla Kovacevic-Ebong), knock someone over on their way from a dodgy dealing, before driving off. Martin is left guilt ridden and is ordered by Ben to kill Keanu Taylor (Danny Walters). Martin attempts to shoot Keanu but is stopped by Linda Carter (Kellie Bright), who helps him fake a recording of shooting Keanu, before he lets Keanu escape. A depressed Martin turns to Sonia and they have sex, resuming a brief fling. Sonia decides to help Martin by secretly bribing his hit and run victim, George. Unbeknown to Martin, George continues to blackmail Sonia for money.

Martin has a one-night stand with Ruby, which does not develop into anything; however, Martin stays with Ruby during the COVID-19 pandemic lockdown and they begin a fling, whilst Martin's divorce with Stacey has been finalized, and the fling progresses into a relationship. In September 2020, Martin is attacked and left for dead by Vinny Panesar (Shiv Jalota) when he stages a robbery to help Ruby claim an insurance. Stacey returns to Walford having been illegally withdrawing money from Ruby's bank account after learning about Martin and Ruby's relationship. Ruby decides to report Stacey to the police, but he persuades her not to so that he can see his children. To prove his love for Ruby and to distract himself from Stacey, Martin suggests that they have a holiday. Upon their return, they announce their marriage. Stacey and Ruby develop a rivalry over Martin, and Ruby is jealous when Martin spends Christmas with Stacey and the Slaters. Martin accidentally gives Stacey an expensive watch, which he planned to give to Ruby, and she assumes that Martin wants to get back together. Stacey and Martin share a kiss but Martin tells her that he wants to remain with Ruby but knows he still loves Stacey. Following the revelation, Ruby pays Kush to take Arthur away from Stacey, which affects Martin until she tells Kush to return Arthur home. Ruby later claims to be pregnant but is less pregnant than she really is. Martin struggles to comprehend his reality and he is repeatedly manipulated by Ruby by lying to him constantly. She lies about Stacey and her family making it about her so Martin can be on side. He is manipulated Into believing Stacey caused a fall when she had nothing to do with it leading to her being falsely imprisoned for 6 months and he is made to neglect his children and Kush dies during this time. Martin finds out six months later after months of manipulation and lying by Ruby, that his family has been set up and Stacey's mother, Jean, is nearly sent to prison for drug dealing but she exacts her revenge on Ruby and lies to the police, telling them that Ruby was her supplier, and Ruby is sent to prison instead. Whilst in prison, Ruby puts the house up for sale, leaving Martin homeless and without a job. She then applies for a divorce. Martin moves in with his friends Sharon Watts (Letitia Dean) and Zack Hudson (James Farrar). Stacey returns from prison and Martin hopes to rekindle their relationship; however, she reveals that she has married a woman, Eve Unwin (Heather Peace), to secure her release from prison, but it is not a romantic relationship. Stacey rebuffs Martin's offer to resume their relationship and she starts dating Kheerat.

Martin takes a job as the market inspector for Bridge Street Market but decides to quit so Stacey can get the job. When Stacey learns the truth, they argue about past events and Martin saves Stacey when she steps into the road and almost gets hit by a car. They later make amends. In August 2022, Lily steals pills that Denise Fox (Diane Parish) had confiscated from Jada Lennox (Kelsey Calladine-Smith). Lily gives the pills to Amy Mitchell (Ellie Dadd) who collapses. Martin believes that Denzel Danes (Jaden Ladega) is to blame and he confronts his father, Howie Danes (Delroy Atkinson). Martin then warns Lily to stay away from Denzel and his friend Davinder "Nugget" Gulati (Juhaim Rasul Choudhury). Martin later overhears Lily confessing to Eve that the pills had come from Jada. They then discover that Stuart had given them to Jada. In January 2023, Stacey discovers that 12-year-old Lily is pregnant. When Martin returns to Walford, he is horrified to be told by the police that Lily is pregnant and he will have to be interviewed. Martin is furious and argues with Stacey, which causes Lily to run away. They find her but the police arrive to talk to Stacey about the identity of the father, but Lily decides to keep the baby's paternity a secret. Martin demands that Lily have an abortion; however, she shocks Martin and Stacey by deciding to keep the baby. Lily soon reveals that Ricky Mitchell (Frankie Day) is the father of her unborn child. Martin and Stacey clash with Ricky's parents Jack and Sam Mitchell (Kim Medcalf), especially when Jack tries to unsuccessfully scare Lily into having an abortion. In order to support Lily's pregnancy, Martin briefly leaves Walford to take a job in Turkey. Upon his return, Stacey suffers and gets into debt, causing bailiffs to arrive to clear Stacey's house. Martin tries to help her which Stacey rejects. They later discover that Lily has been bullying a girl at school. However, they learn that Lily was doing so to protect herself from being bullied due to her pregnancy. Martin becomes suspicious of teacher Theo Hawthorne (William Ellis) when he starts tutoring Lily for free. He and Eve decide to investigate Theo and discover that he was forced to leave his previous school after a member of staff accused him of stalking. Theo manages to manipulate Stacey and she convinces Martin that Theo is innocent. Martin and Stacey grow closer and consider reuniting. However, Martin struggles to accept Stacey posting explicit photos of herself on SecretCam, an OnlyFans-style website, for money, and they choose to remain friends. Stacey starts being stalked and Martin suspects Theo. Martin and Eve decide to investigate Theo further. They learn from a former colleague that Theo had stalked his ex-girlfriend, leading to her suicide. They try to call Stacey to warn her, but Theo exposes himself to Stacey just as Lily's waters break. He traps her in the kitchen and tries to coerce her into a relationship. Martin and Eve arrive and rescue Stacey from Theo, and Lily gives birth to a daughter, Charli. Theo continues stalking Stacey, and Martin supports her through the ordeal. Theo later pleads guilty in court and is given a restraining order against Stacey and the Slaters.

In January 2024, Martin visits Michelle in Australia as she is having an operation. Martin returns during a family barbecue and catches Jack kissing Stacey. He then reveals this to Jack's stepdaughter, Chelsea Fox (Zaraah Abrahams), who then exposes it to the Branning family. A major confrontation ensues with Martin and Jack having a fistfight. Martin begins a brief romance with Priya Nandra-Hart (Sophie Khan Levy) and they have a date at Peggy's. Their blossoming romance is interrupted by her daughter, Avani (Aaliyah James) who wants Priya and her father, Ravi Gulati (Aaron Thiara) to reunite. Avani tries to ruin their date by making inappropriate comments about Martin and deliberately spilling water on his lap. Martin becomes suspicious of Sonia's boyfriend, Reiss Colwell (Jonny Freeman) when he tries to convince Sonia to sell her house and leave Walford. Martin supports Sonia when she is arrested for the murder of Reiss' comatose wife Debbie Colwell (Jenny Meier) - unbeknownst to everyone, Reiss had murdered her.

In September 2024, when Sharon is sent to prison, she learns from Chrissie Watts (Tracy-Ann Oberman) that Ruby had secretly given birth to Martin's child and has kept it a secret from him. Sharon and Phil hire Johnny Carter (Charlie Suff) to trace Ruby, and they find her living in Essex with her and Martin's son, Roman Allen. Sharon reveals this to Martin, just as Ruby returns and confronts Martin over Roman's birth certificate being stolen. She lies to Martin that Roman was adopted, but he and Stacey follow her to a hospital where Ruby is visiting Roman. Ruby reveals that Roman was admitted owing to autoimmune hepatitis, but Martin learns that he had also had a paracetamol overdose. Initially, Ruby stops Martin from seeing Roman but relents. Martin then plots to battle Ruby for custody of Roman, with Stacey agreeing to help him; she accidentally reveals this to Ruby who prevents him from seeing Roman again, as revenge. Roman's condition becomes more serious and a donor liver that has been found is not a match for Roman. However, Martin is a match and immediately agrees to donate his liver. Martin and Stacey become closer and share a kiss, but Stacey refuses to take things further. Martin then decides to pursue things with Ruby again and they kiss. During Honey (Emma Barton) and Billy Mitchell's (Perry Fenwick) second wedding reception, The Queen Vic explodes after a car crashes into it. Martin helps Jean, Lily, Ruby and several others to escape, but over Ruby's objections, he goes back in to help Stacey, who refuses to leave without discussing her and Martin's relationship, believing they still have a future together. Martin and Stacey bicker over their past and Stacey asks Martin to choose between her and Ruby. Before he can answer, he and Stacey become trapped in the building by falling rubble, they begin digging their way out of the building. As they are about to leave, Martin finally confesses his love for Stacey; the roof above them then collapses and Martin is crushed by a beam. While the emergency services try to free him, Martin admits that he never truly loved Ruby and asks Stacey to marry him again, which she accepts. Martin suggests he and Stacey leave Walford with their children once they re-marry, to which they suggest several ideas of where they could go. The paramedics inform Stacey that Martin is now suffering a life-threatening case of crush syndrome and advise her to prepare for the worst. Martin delivers a makeshift speech to Stacey to practice for their wedding. As the firefighters attempt to lift the beam, Martin falls unconscious and suffers a cardiac arrest. The paramedics begin performing CPR on him, but are unsuccessful and pronounce him dead. With Jean and Ruby waiting outside with other Albert Square residents, they hear Stacey's devastated screams, which confirms Martin's death.

== Reception ==
In 2020, Sara Wallis and Ian Hyland from The Daily Mirror placed Martin 56th on their ranked list of the best EastEnders characters of all time, calling him Pauline and Arthur's teenage "tearaway son". Martin's death was shortlisted for "Best Exit" at the 2025 Inside Soap Awards.
