= Willy Roper =

Fictional character from the BBC soap opera EastEnders

- EastEnders character
- Portrayed by: Michael Tudor Barnes
- Duration: 1995–1996
- First appearance: Episode 1139; 1 June 1995
- Last appearance: Episode 1305; 20 June 1996
In-universe information
- Other names: Edward Price
- Mother: Violet Roper

Willy Roper is a fictional character from the BBC soap opera EastEnders, played by Michael Tudor Barnes. The character appears on-screen in episodes originally broadcast between 1 June 1995 and 20 June 1996.

Villainous Willy was dubbed "Wicked Willy" by the British press after the storyline in which he frames Arthur Fowler (Bill Treacher) for embezzlement, leading to his wrongful imprisonment. The truth is eventually uncovered by Arthur's wife Pauline Fowler (Wendy Richard) through an uncharacteristic seduction, though it is too late for Arthur as he dies shortly after his release due to a head injury he sustained in a prison riot.

== Character creation and development ==
Introduced in June 1995, Willy plays a key part in the long-running storyline that eventually leads to the exit of one of EastEnders' original characters, Arthur Fowler. The actor Michael Tudor Barnes was cast in the role for a six-month period, which was extended for a further six months as the storyline developed. The character was brought in for the specific purpose of engineering Arthur's departure.

The storyline captured the public's imagination and a nationwide "Free Arthur Fowler" campaign was launched – "Arthur Fowler Is Innocent" T-shirts were produced and a single was even released in the UK singles chart promoting the campaign. However, Arthur's imprisonment was actually a precursor to the final exit of actor Bill Treacher, who decided to leave EastEnders after 11 years playing Arthur. While Arthur went to pieces in prison, Pauline was heavily embroiled in the storyline pertaining to his eventual release. For several months viewers witnessed Willy attempt to woo Pauline, but she eventually uncovered his deception and then resorted to uncharacteristic seduction to gain his confession.

After the character's departure, Tudor Barnes said in an interview, "I was most fortunate in having Bill Treacher as a colleague. Nobody could have been more welcoming and helpful than Bill. He was totally professional and unfailingly cheerful, no matter how tough the going got. A fine actor and a fine gentleman. Even though I was the instrument of his departure, I was very sorry to see him go."

== Storylines ==
Willy is first seen in June 1995 at the funeral of Tom Palmer, who had an allotment near to Arthur Fowler's in Walford. Willy is also an allotment owner, and he is instrumental in getting Arthur elected as the secretary of the allotment committee. Arthur begins raising money to create a new eco-friendly, urban garden, which is named the Flowering Wilderness Fund. Willy takes a keen interest in all of his financial dealings. By the end of the year Arthur raises £20,000 for the garden, and this is enough to tempt Willy to crime.

Willy is the sole carer of his senile mother. Desperate to get the funds to pay for her placement at a nursing home, he decides to con Arthur into signing the fund money into various accounts, and then leaves him to face the consequences when the money is declared missing. For a second time, Arthur is faced with a police investigation and with all the evidence stacked against him, he is soon arrested and ends the year in prison. This is too much for Arthur, who is unable to face the prospect of serving a prison sentence for a crime he did not commit. Upon his incarceration, he suffers a mental breakdown and refuses any contact with Pauline, which devastates her.

Not content with putting Arthur in prison, Willy spends the beginning of 1996 trying to woo Pauline in his absence. Her son Mark Fowler (Todd Carty) is furious at the amount of time Willy and Pauline spend together, but Pauline finds Willy to be a great comfort and refuses to stop seeing him socially. Following his mother's death in April 1996, Willy asks Pauline to go on holiday to Jersey. Mark correctly figures out that his real motive is to put the stolen money in an off-shore account under a false name, but Pauline refuses to believe Mark's accusations. While away, Pauline and Willy become very close, but this all changes when she discovers his counterfeit credit cards and her suspicions begin to rise. She does not inform Willy of her discovery, but immediately returns to Walford the following day after he confesses his undying love for her.

Back in Walford, a furious Pauline is then persuaded by Mark to extract a confession from Willy. She lures him over under the pretence that she wants to rekindle their friendship. On their night alone, Pauline plies Willy with alcohol and seduces the truth from him. Willy – momentarily believing that his criminal genius will impress Pauline – confesses to embezzlement and tells her how he had managed to frame Arthur. The police are informed and Willy is arrested and charged, though he is released on bail.

Arthur is cleared, but before Pauline can pass on the good news she is told that he had been involved in a prison riot. Arthur is released the next day, but he has received a blow to the head in the riot, although no one realises the seriousness of his injury until it is too late. Only a few days after his release in May 1996, Arthur suffers a brain haemorrhage on the allotments, and dies the next day in hospital. Arthur's funeral is held and Mark is incensed to see Willy in attendance. He confronts Willy and ends up assaulting him. In November 1996 Willy is sentenced to three years in prison.
