= Gwilym Kessey =

Australian cricketer

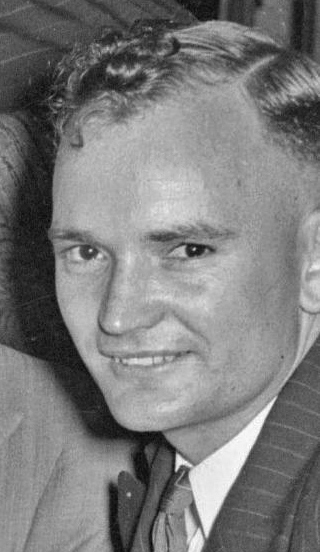
- Kessey in 1948

Personal information
- Full name: Gwilym Taf Kessey
- Born: 13 January 1919; Meekatharra, Western Australia
- Died: 25 June 1986 (aged 67); Perth, Western Australia
- Batting: Right-handed
- Bowling: Wicket-keeper

Domestic team information
- Years: Team
- 1945/46–1949/50: Western Australia

Career statistics
Competition	First-class
Matches	13
Runs scored	320
Batting average	21.33
100s/50s	0/1
Top score	60
Catches/stumpings	19/7
- Source: CricketArchive, 29 July 2011

Gwilym Taf Kessey (13 January 1919 – 25 June 1986) was an Australian cricketer who played thirteen first-class matches between 1945 and 1950 for Western Australian sides as a wicket-keeper. He made his debut for Western Australia in 1945 against the Australian Services cricket team, making 22* in his only innings. Kessey played in Western Australia's inaugural Sheffield Shield match in November 1947 against South Australia, making 12 runs batting at #8. He played one match for a Western Australia Combined XI featuring Test players Ian Johnson, Ken Meuleman, Bruce Dooland and Sid Barnes against the MCC in 1946, stumping Test cricketers Denis Compton and Bill Edrich. Overall, he played 13 first-class matches, scoring 320 runs with a highest score of 60, and making 26 dismissals. His identical twin daughters, Karen and Katherine Kessey, were both actresses.
