= Katherine Kessey =

Australian actress

- Born: 28 January 1946 (age 80); Perth, Western Australia
- Occupation: Actress
- Spouse: Bill Treacher (m. 1971; died 2022)
- Children: 2

Katherine Glyn Kessey (born 28 January 1946) is an Australian actress. She is the widow of British actor Bill Treacher. Their son Jamie Treacher is also an actor. She was born in Perth, Western Australia, where her father, Gwilym Kessey, played first-class cricket for Western Australia. She made her television debut in 1966 as a twin daughter in Nelson: A Study in Miniature with her twin sister, Karen Kessey, playing the other twin daughter. They also appeared in the Australian TV play All Fall Down and together with Roger Moore and Tony Curtis in episode No. 15 'Element of Risk' of the TV-series The Persuaders!.
