= Arthur Fowler =

Fictional character from EastEnders

- EastEnders character
- Portrayed by: Bill Treacher
- Duration: 1985–1996
- First appearance: Episode 1 "Poor Old Reg"; 19 February 1985
- Last appearance: Episode 1292; 21 May 1996
- Created by: Tony Holland and Julia Smith
- Book appearances: Swings and Roundabouts
In-universe information
- Other names: Arthur George Fowler
- Occupation: Manufacturer; Barman; Gardener; Road sweeper
- Family: Fowler
- Father: Christopher Fowler
- Wife: Pauline Beale (until 1996)
- Sons: Mark Fowler; Martin Fowler
- Daughters: Michelle Fowler
- Grandsons: Mark Fowler; Roman Allen
- Granddaughters: Vicki Fowler; Bex Fowler; Hope Fowler
- Aunts: Betty
- First cousins: Doreen

Arthur Fowler is a fictional character from the BBC soap opera EastEnders, played by Bill Treacher from 1985 to 1996. Arthur featured in archive footage in 2025 to celebrate the show's 40th anniversary.

The father of the Fowler family, Arthur was essentially a good man but made some foolish choices that he always ended up paying dearly for. His storylines involved being bossed to the brink of insanity by his mother-in-law Lou Beale (Anna Wing), an affair with Christine Hewitt (Elizabeth Power), suffering a mental disorder, being sent to prison twice, and dying of a brain haemorrhage in 1996.

== Creation ==
Arthur Fowler was one of the original twenty-three characters invented by the creators of EastEnders, Tony Holland and Julia Smith. Arthur was a member of the first family of EastEnders, the Beales and Fowlers, and Holland took the inspiration for some of the series' earliest characters from his own London family and background. Arthur's original character outline as written by Smith and Holland appeared in an abridged form in their book, EastEnders: The Inside Story.

"Rock-solid and reliable. Has an instinctive (unintellectual) wisdom...He cries openly at funerals, loves his wife, is strict with his children, doesn't drink a lot, supports Arsenal, votes Labour and would never walk down the street carrying flowers. He worked in a factory – but was made redundant, and has been unemployed for a year." (page 54)

Bill Treacher was the first actor Holland and Smith had thought of to play the character, in fact, Arthur had almost been invented with him in mind. Both had worked with Treacher before on the popular BBC drama Z-Cars. His qualities as an actor were exactly the ones they wanted for the "very difficult" part of Arthur: "Warmth, directness and an ability to be convincingly ordinary without being dull". Treacher admitted in 2015 that he was initially reluctant to take on the role due to the long hours and the distance from his family, but said, "I rang my agent and said, 'Tell Julia I'll do it'. She said, 'I already have.' As an actor it's hard to get regular work, it's not that sort of career. So you don't turn down a good job."

== Development ==
Arthur was initially scripted to be an extremely depressed character, which stemmed from his inability to find employment and provide sufficiently for his family. Arthur's fall into depression was considered to be an extremely risky storyline to portray, as his decline was to take place over a lengthy period of time. His loss of pride (resulting in theft of the residents' Christmas club money) and the deterioration of his health as a result, was an important issue that Tony Holland wanted to get right. His character had "to reach the gutter" before he could be put on the "straight and narrow again". The deteriorating situation was to be shown graphically, with "no punches pulled". His eventual harrowing breakdown and destruction of Lou Beale's (Anna Wing) living room was written by Tony Holland and aired on Christmas Day 1986. Holland and Smith initially feared that the audience may not be able to tolerate so much doom and gloom at Christmas; however, that same episode went on to pull in 30.1 million viewers, giving the soap its highest ever episode rating, which has yet to be beaten by any other plotline from any other soap in the UK.

It was initially decided that Arthur would not go to prison for stealing the Christmas club money, until a legal advisor to the programme suggested that EastEnders would not be portraying a likely outcome. In reality he would probably get twenty-eight days in prison, so that others could be taught a lesson, and so that is what happened on-screen. The episode where Arthur was sent to prison was written by Bill Lyons, and dominated by Arthur's trial. A special court set had to be hired, but it was too large to fit into the regular EastEnders studio at Elstree, and needed an extra studio. The episode cut back and forth between the trial and the regular goings-on in the Square before climaxing with the shock decision of the judge, who told Arthur that, as he had betrayed people's trust he must be seen to be punished, and she sentenced him to twenty-eight days.

During 1989, Holland and Smith left EastEnders and executive producer Mike Gibbon took control, heralding a new era for the show. Humour became an important element in the storylines during 1989, partly due to media criticism which had been labelling the show as depressing. There featured a greater amount of slapstick and light comedy than had previously been seen, and this led to a certain amount of criticism from some fans and critics, who suggested that the credibility of the show was being stretched. Such storylines included Arthur's unlikely success on a fictional television game show Cat and Mouse. The episode was written by Tony McHale and, despite the criticism, it is considered by EastEnders writer Colin Brake as "one of the funniest and most outrageous episodes" of EastEnders ever aired". The fictional game show even used video game music from past Commodore 64 titles.

One of the big storylines in EastEnders in 1992 was Arthur's infidelity with the lonely divorcée Christine Hewitt (Elizabeth Power). The storyline built up slowly and was conceived by the writer Tony McHale. The audience had witnessed Arthur and his wife Pauline (Wendy Richard) rowing many times, but they were generally seen as the most stable of all couples ever featured in the show, and so the storyline involving Arthur's extramarital affair came as a huge shock to viewers. The British press labelled the storyline "The Bonk Of The Year" and it finally reached its climax on-screen in September 1993. The scriptwriters had many conferences about ways in which Pauline would find out about the affair; should she work it out herself or should some third party tell her the truth? In the end it was felt that Arthur should decide to tell her himself, which he did in a shocking episode that saw Pauline turn violent and hit Arthur in the face with a frying pan. This episode (written by Tony McHale and directed by Keith Boak) was chosen by writer Colin Brake as the episode of the year in EastEnders: The First Ten Years.

Arthur became one of EastEnders best loved characters, and his reputation as an eternal loser endeared him to viewers. In 1995 audiences were shocked and horrified when Arthur was framed for the embezzlement of the Flowering Wilderness Campaign funds and wrongfully imprisoned. There was a public outcry and a nationwide Free Arthur Fowler campaign was launched. 'Arthur Fowler Is Innocent' T-shirts were produced and a single was even released in the UK Singles Chart promoting the campaign. Eventually the truth came out and Arthur was released. However, a gash to the head he had sustained in prison led to a brain haemorrhage and Arthur died suddenly in 1996 shortly after his release. Bill Treacher had asked to be written out of the series after eleven years playing Arthur. Treacher stated in a 2003 interview that he was forced to resign from the show in the end due to the negative effect it was having on his health.

== Storylines ==
Unemployed Arthur lives in Walford with his wife Pauline (Wendy Richard), their two children Mark (David Scarboro and Todd Carty) and Michelle (Susan Tully) and Pauline's mother Lou Beale (Anna Wing). Pauline is pregnant with her third child, and gives birth to a son, Martin Fowler (Jon Peyton Price, James Alexandrou and James Bye). Arthur's greatest pleasure is gardening and he obtains a spot in the local allotment, which he regularly uses as a foil to escape his nagging mother-in-law (and later his equally-nagging wife). Over the years Arthur finds a steady stream of odd jobs to keep him occupied. He works for Tony Carpenter (Oscar James) as a carpenter's helper, deliveryman and as a road sweeper in the market. For a brief period in 1986, he is also employed by Walford Cleaning Services to clean the local schools. Lou dies in 1988. Arthur initially has a distant relationship with Mark and is unable to keep him in check when he turns to crime in his late teens.

Arthur's mental breakdown in late 1986

Arthur's lack of employment becomes a huge problem for him in 1986 when his daughter, Michelle, announces her engagement to Lofty Holloway (Tom Watt). Desperate to give his daughter a wedding that the family can be proud of, Arthur decides to take money from the Walford residents' Christmas Club savings scheme that he has been running, telling the community he got the money from his cousin Doreen, who had emigrated. However, with Christmas fast approaching, Arthur realises that he will have to do something to explain the lack of money in the account to everyone that contributed. Arthur announces to the members that he has withdrawn the money, then stages a fake burglary at his house and tells the police that the Christmas Club money has been stolen. However, Arthur's attempts to make the robbery look legitimate fail, and the police soon realise that Arthur is the culprit. When questioned by the police, he confesses and after his arrest he becomes severely morose, withdrawn and depressed. This culminates in Arthur finally having a nervous breakdown on Christmas Day and smashing his living room in a violent rage. By early 1987, Arthur has become so despondent that he is admitted to hospital. He returns the following spring to stand trial for the theft of the Christmas Club money. Despite Arthur having the whole community behind him – they understand his motives and feel sympathetic to his mental issues – he is sent to prison for 28 days. After his release, he makes things worse by borrowing money from a loan shark.

Mark returns in 1990 and announces on Christmas Day the following year that he is HIV positive. Arthur has a difficult time accepting his son's illness and his lack of education concerning HIV leads him to react in trepidation. Mark eventually helps him come to terms with his status, and he and Arthur enjoy a close relationship in the following years. In 1991, Arthur starts his own gardening business and is awarded a contract to maintain the Albert Square gardens. This leads to Arthur being employed by lonely divorcée Christine Hewitt (Elizabeth Power). Christine and Arthur soon become friends and Christine becomes Arthur's assistant. In May, Pauline goes to New Zealand to care for her brother Kenny (Michael Attwell), who has been in a car accident. In Pauline's absence, Christine becomes a regular visitor to Albert Square and becomes very fond of Arthur. By Christmas, Arthur and Christine embark on an affair. Christine begins to crave more commitment and when he refuses, she gets a job at Kathy Beale's (Gillian Taylforth) café so she can be close to him. The affair continues until Kathy sees them kissing and forces a confession from Christine. Faced with the threat that Pauline may find out, Arthur begins to cool their romance. Christine, sensing that she is losing Arthur, becomes emotionally erratic and begins to drink heavily, stalks Arthur around the square and attempts to buy the affections of his younger son, Martin. This only infuriates Arthur.

Pauline hits Arthur with a frying pan after he admits to an affair with Christine Hewitt

As a last resort Christine threatens to tell Pauline, unless Arthur tells her about their affair. Arthur finally admits the truth to Pauline, but tells her that he wants her and not Christine. Hurt, embarrassed and angry, Pauline responds by hitting Arthur in the face with a frying pan, throwing a television set at him and then kicking him out of their home.

Arthur is forced to move in with his son Mark, and he spends the rest of the year desperately trying to convince Pauline that it is her he wants. Pauline and Arthur eventually reconcile when he helps her deal with the death of her brother Pete (Peter Dean). The affair is never allowed to be forgotten, however, particularly when Pauline's relative Nellie Ellis (Elizabeth Kelly) comes to lodge and discovers his escapades.

In 1995, Arthur is elected secretary of the allotment committee, and starts raising money to create a new eco-friendly, urban garden, which is named the Flowering Wilderness Fund. Arthur attends a funeral later that year and runs into an old friend, Willy Roper (Michael Tudor-Barnes), who takes a keen interest in Arthur's financial dealings. By the end of the year, Arthur has managed to raise twenty thousand pounds for the garden, and this is enough to tempt Willy to crime.

Willy is the sole carer of his senile mother, and desperate to get the funds to pay for her placement at a nursing home, he decides to con Arthur into signing the fund money into various accounts, and then leaves Arthur to deal with the consequences when the money is declared missing. For a second time, Arthur is faced with a police investigation and with all the evidence stacked against him, he is soon arrested and ends the year behind bars. This is too much for Arthur, who is unable to face the prospect of serving a prison sentence for a crime he did not commit, and upon his imprisonment he suffers a mental breakdown and refuses any contact with his family.

Not content with putting Arthur in prison, Willy spends the beginning of 1996 trying to woo Pauline in his absence, even taking her on holiday to Jersey. However, this proves to be Willy's undoing, after Mark correctly surmises that his real motive is to put the stolen money in an off-shore account under a false name. The evidence continues to stack up when Pauline discovers counterfeit credit cards on Willy. Willy is eventually arrested and charged, and Arthur is cleared. However, before the family can pass on the good news, they are told that Arthur has been involved in a huge prison riot. Arthur is released the next day, but he has received a nasty blow to the head in the riot, although no one realises the seriousness of his injury until it is too late. On 20 May 1996, a few days after his release from prison, Arthur suffers a brain haemorrhage on the allotments, and dies the next day in hospital. Arthur's funeral is delayed pending an inquest, but the jury eventually returns a verdict of accidental death, much to the disgust of Mark and Pauline, who believe that the prison services neglected to seek proper medical help for Arthur. A bench is placed in dedication to his memory in Albert Square; the dedication is entitled "Arthur Fowler: He loved this place".
