= Tale of the Mummy =

- Theatrical release poster
- Directed by: Russell Mulcahy
- Screenplay by: John Esposito; Russell Mulcahy
- Story by: Keith Williams; Russell Mulcahy
- Produced by: Silvio Muraglia; Daniel Sladek
- Starring: Jason Scott Lee; Louise Lombard; Sean Pertwee; Lysette Anthony; Michael Lerner; Jack Davenport; Honor Blackman; Christopher Lee; Shelley Duvall
- Cinematography: Gabriel Beristain
- Edited by: Armen Minasian
- Music by: Stefano Mainetti
- Production companies: 7th Voyage; Centurion; Cine Grande Corporation; The Carousel Picture Company; The Pharaohs Company Ltd.; Telepool
- Distributed by: Dimension Films
- Release date: July 10, 1998 (Fantasia Film Festival)
- Running time: 115 minutes (original cut); 88 minutes (North American cut)
- Countries: United States; Luxembourg
- Language: English
- Budget: $10 million

Tale of the Mummy (also known as Russell Mulcahy's Tale of the Mummy and Talos – the Mummy) is a 1998 adventure horror thriller film directed by Russell Mulcahy, and starring Jason Scott Lee, Jack Davenport, Sean Pertwee, Louise Lombard, Michael Lerner, Christopher Lee, Honor Blackman, and Shelley Duvall. Set in London, the film follows a woman who battles the curse of Talos, an ancient mummy, years after his tomb was infiltrated by her archeologist grandfather.

== Plot ==
In 1948, Egypt, an archeological dig led by Richard Turkel reaches a supposedly cursed tomb belonging to Talos. The hieroglyphics at the entrance warn that all should avoid the place. Despite this, they open the chamber's door only to be blasted with a cloud of dust, causing the archeologists bodies to crumble apart. Richard manages to blow the tomb shut, killing himself in the process.

In 1999, Richard's granddaughter Sam Turkel continues where he left off. Sam, Brad, Burke, and another member of the team break into Talos' burial chamber and see a sarcophagus suspended from the ceiling. Burke falls to his death after he reaches for an amulet, while Brad has a seizure while experiencing Talos' past atrocities.

Nine months later, a power cut occurs before Talos' sarcophagus is going for an exhibition in which it is broken open. Later, a foreigner is killed and his eyes removed. Detective Riley is assigned to the case and believes the killer will strike again. Later, Talos kills several people and removes different organs from different victims. Riley approaches Sam as he thinks Brad is a prime suspect, while she explains the core of Talos' myth to Riley: Talos directed that his followers remove his body parts, and they believed he would someday be resurrected to reclaim them, gaining physical perfection and immortality.

Later, Brad is arrested and tells Talos' history to Riley: Talos was exiled from Greece for sorcery and came to Egypt, where he fell in love, and in a pagan ceremony, married the Pharaoh's daughter, Nefriama. All who opposed him were struck with disease or tortured into believing his theology, so the Pharaoh ordered him dead. To save Nefriama from death, the Pharaoh told her about Talos' upcoming execution, and she, in turn, told Talos. When the Pharaoh's army reached Talos' chamber, they saw Nefriama eating Talos' heart. The followers of Talos were all put to death, including Nefriama. Riley guesses that the murder victims are reincarnations of the Pharaoh's followers. Brad believes Sam is Nefriama's reincarnation and killing her is the only way to stop Talos, who plans to be reborn when the planets align. Brad further explains that part of Talos' curse is that anyone who knows what is going on will be deemed crazy, like himself. After Riley steps out of the interrogating cell, Talos appears and kills Detective Bartone and Brad. A reborn Talos tracks down Sam and captures her.

Riley, now believing Brad, takes part in a ritual where Brad's dead body shows them the possible location Sam might be held hostage: an unfinished construction site. Meanwhile, Sam frees herself and stumbles upon a room where a huge nest made of gauze forms a "cocoon" accompanied by the dead bodies of Talos' victims. As she watches, a horrifying mummy comes out from the cocoon, which quickly evolves into the true form of Talos with only the heart missing.

Riley and his group arrive at the construction site with only minutes remaining before the planets align, and Talos regains his physical immortality. Riley and Claire separate from Butros and Professor Marcus. The latter encounters Talos who manipulates Marcus into killing Butros by strangling her. Meanwhile, Claire falls down and gravely injures her leg, forcing Riley to go forward without her. Professor Marcus finds Claire, who kills him after Talos manipulates her.

Riley finds Sam as Talos intercepts them. Sam begs Riley to kill her, which he reluctantly does. However, Riley is revealed as the reincarnation of Nefriama and it was his heart that Talos wanted, using Sam to lure him. Claire appears and takes out Riley's heart which Talos assimilates within himself just as the planets align.

The police arrive and pull out four dead bodies along with a now hysterical Claire, with the evidence pointing to her as the killer for the authorities. Elsewhere in London, the newly reborn Talos is shown disguised as Riley.

== Cast ==
- Jason Scott Lee as Det. Riley
- Louise Lombard as Samantha Turkel
- Sean Pertwee as Bradley Cortese
- Lysette Anthony as Dr. Claire Mulrooney
- Michael Lerner as Prof. Marcus
- Jack Davenport as Det. Bartone
- Honor Blackman as Captain Shea
- Christopher Lee as Sir Richard Turkel
- Shelley Duvall as Edith Butros
- Gerard Butler as Burke
- Jon Polito as Parsons
- Ronan Vibert as Young
- Bill Treacher as Stuart
- Elizabeth Power as Mary
- Roger Morrissey as The Mummy
- Enzo Junior as Prince Talos

== Production ==
The film was devised by Russell Mulcahy and his close friend Keith Williams as therapy to get over a skiing accident suffered by the director during Christmas 1995 as Williams knew of Mulcahy's affinity for the Hammer Mummy film. Tale of the Mummy was filmed in Luxembourg in the Fall of 1997 under the title of Talos the Mummy. In June 1998, Miramax's genre label Dimension Films acquired distribution rights to the film. Shelley Duvall agreed to join the film as she was a fan of horror and had wanted to work with Mulcahy since the mid-1980s when she had wanted him to direct Mother Goose Rock 'n' Rhyme until an inability to sync up their schedules forced Mulcahy to pass on that project.

== Reception ==
Nicholas Sylvain of DVD Verdict derided the film, saying that while it had an interesting premise, some effects were "merely bad, while others border on the ludicrous", and that the story made no sense. Martin Liebman of Blu-ray.com gave it a 2.5/5 rating, conceding that the film is technically well-done, but calling the plotting unoriginal and characters bland. He recommended that viewers only watch the scenes with Christopher Lee. Sebastian Zavala for ScreenAnarchy felt that the film did not feel like a serious horror film, nor a lighthearted adventure, but he found it entertaining. British Horror Films reviewer Chris Wood praised Tale of the Mummy as an homage to Hammer Films horror films of mid-20th century, with the token inclusion of Lee.

Tale of the Mummy currently has a 17% on Rotten Tomatoes based on 6 reviews, with an average rating of 4.19/10.

== Home media ==
The North American version is only 88 minutes, shorter than the European version of 115 minutes. A Blu-ray of the film was released by Echo Bridge Home Entertainment on March 20, 2012.
