= Elizabeth Power =

British actress

- Born: Eastbourne, England
- Occupation: Actress
- Years active: 1959–present
- Notable credit: Christine Hewitt in EastEnders
- Spouse: Michael Aspel (m. 1977; sep. 1994)
- Children: 2

Elizabeth Power is an English actress. Power began her career in repertory theatre and went on to appear in several West End musicals. However, she is best known for her work on British television, in particular her role as Christine Hewitt in the BBC soap opera EastEnders (1992–1993). She has since gone on to feature in various stage productions.

== Early life ==
Power was born in Eastbourne, East Sussex. She began singing and dancing lessons at the age of four, prompted by her mother, who was very keen for her to perform. However, at the age of 14, Power concluded "that she wasn't physically suited to be a dancer", so she decided to take up acting on the advice of her teacher. Power auditioned for a place at the Royal Academy of Dramatic Art (RADA) at the age of 17, and was accepted. She has commented: "I just glided into it so I was still naive…RADA was good and I realised there was more than just going on stage and being clapped." Power graduated from RADA in 1966.

== Career ==
Power began her acting career on stage, appearing at a young age as Alison in a revival of the Slade-Reynolds Christmas musical, The Merry Gentleman, at the Bristol Old Vic in 1959. After leaving RADA in 1966, she worked for 18 months at the Belgrade Theatre, Coventry. She had various roles in repertory theatre during her early career, and has since commented: "I got lots of jobs in rep, learning my craft and playing totally unsuitable roles – old ladies and the sort of stuff you did in those days."

Power went on to appear in various West End musicals. In 1969 she played the leading role, Lucy, in Two Cities, a British musical about the Charles Dickens story A Tale of Two Cities, which played at the Palace Theatre, London. She later toured in a production of The Pajama Game, and in 1972 she played Avonia Bunn in the Julian Slade musical, Trelawny, which was based on the Pinero play Trelawny of the Wells. The show opened at the Bristol Old Vic, then transferred to Sadler's Wells Theatre and later the Prince of Wales Theatre, with Power staying for its entire run. In 1974 she was cast in the revue Cole, built around the songs of Cole Porter, which played at the Mermaid Theatre. The following year, she appeared in So Who Needs Marriage?, a musical written by Monty Norman, which toured for a few weeks in May 1975. So Who Needs Marriage? ended up being Power's "swansong" in musicals. She has since commented that the musicals of the late 1960s and early 1970s were not the sort of shows that suited her vocal talents: "The musicals were mainly American imports. If you didn't have that big chesty voice, there was no place for you…"

Power switched to television acting in the 1970s. One of her first television roles was in the BBC science fiction series Doctor Who and the Silurians in 1970. She went on to appear in the BBC drama series Softly Softly (1973); The Magician's Heart (BBC, 1973); Lillie (ITV, 1978); Hazell (1978); a regular role as Celia Travers in Crown Court (ITV, 1978–1982); Juliet Bravo (BBC, 1981), and Prince Regent (BBC, 1979).

Power's most notable television role has been her portrayal of Christine Hewitt in the BBC soap opera EastEnders. Power was offered the role by one of the programme's producers, Leonard Lewis, with whom she had worked previously on Juliet Bravo and Softly, Softly. She has commented: "I got a call out of the blue asking if I could go up to the BBC at Elstree to meet him. Mrs Hewitt was going to be in five episodes and I thought, 'wonderful'." Mrs Hewitt made her first appearance on-screen in February 1992, as a lonely divorcee who employed the long running character Arthur Fowler (Bill Treacher) to tend to her garden – used as a plot device to rebuild Arthur's relationship with his son Mark Fowler (Todd Carty), while they worked together on Christine's garden. Power filmed her scenes for the five episodes and thought that would be the end of it; however, she was subsequently contacted by Leonard Lewis and asked to reprise the role. Power commented: "It was all I could do to stop myself screeching down the phone. They didn't tell me which direction the story was going to take. I got on so well with [Bill Treacher] from the word go. We really liked each other." Mrs Hewitt was reintroduced in a storyline that saw her become Arthur Fowler's mistress, but when the affair ended Power left the series, making her final appearance on-screen in October 1993.

Power has subsequently appeared in the horror film Tale of the Mummy (1998), a role that reunited her with actor Bill Treacher on-screen as husband and wife. Power and Treacher were offered the parts by director Russell Mulcahy, who was an "avid fan" of them in EastEnders. Power has commented: "[Russell Mulcahy] was in Hollywood but used to get friends to video the Arthur and Mrs Hewitt scenes. So he thought it would be a good idea to get us together again. He thought it would be a great joke. We played a caretaker and his wife." Power has also appeared twice in the BBC medical soap Doctors (2001; 2004), but she has been most active in theatre rather than television post EastEnders. She appeared in Alan Bennett's Habeas Corpus at Farnham in 1993, and in 2001 she starred in Richard Harris' award-winning comedy Stepping Out, as a stern piano teacher, Mrs Fraser. She lent her skills to the International Festival of Musical Theatre in Cardiff in 2002, and starred in Trevor Baxter's adaptation of The Picture of Dorian Gray, which toured the UK in 2003.

== Personal life ==
Power lives in Surrey and is a mother of two. She married the British television personality Michael Aspel in 1977. Their marriage ended in 1994. She is a skilled dancer and piano player, and has used both skills on stage in various productions including Stepping Out.
