= Bill Treacher =

English actor (1930–2022)

- Treacher as Arthur Fowler in EastEnders
- Born: William Charles Treacher; 4 June 1930; Dagenham, Essex, England
- Died: 5 November 2022 (aged 92); Bury St. Edmunds, Suffolk, England
- Occupation: Actor
- Years active: 1960–2012
- Television: EastEnders (1985–1996)
- Spouse: Katherine Kessey (m. 1971)
- Children: 2

William Charles Treacher (4 June 1930 – 5 November 2022) was an English actor. He was best known for playing Arthur Fowler in the BBC One soap opera EastEnders from 1985 to 1996, having been the first person to be cast for the show.

== Early life ==
Treacher was born in Dagenham, one of eight children (six boys and two girls) of roofer and tiler William Perks Treacher and Minnie (née Chappell). He grew up in Hackney, Bethnal Green, Mile End and Waltham Cross, and was evacuated to Gloucestershire during the Second World War. He attended Kings Road JMI School in Waltham Cross and worked as a porter at Waltham Cross station. After his national service in the Royal Air Force, he worked for four years as a steward with P&O, where he saved enough money to attend drama school.

== Career ==
=== Theatre ===
After graduating from the Webber Douglas Academy of Dramatic Art, he made his West End debut in 1963 with the comedy Shout for Life at The Vaudeville Theatre. Several successful West End roles followed.

=== Television ===
Treacher then moved into television drama, making appearances in a number of classic series of the 1970s including Grange Hill, Bless This House, Minder, The Professionals, Dixon of Dock Green, Z-Cars and The Agatha Christie Hour.

Treacher appeared in bit-part television roles several times during the 1970s, including in the police drama The Sweeney episode "Selected Target", as a sailor in the Dad's Army episode "Menace from the Deep" and in 1975 as Arnold in an episode of the comedy series Bless This House entitled "The Phantom Pools Winner".

In 2006, Treacher had a guest-starring role in the ITV police drama The Bill. He also appeared as a security guard in an episode of Casualty in December 2007.

==== EastEnders ====
In late 1984, Treacher was the first actor to be cast in the BBC soap opera EastEnders, appearing in the first episode on 19 February 1985, as Arthur Fowler, a role he played for the next eleven years. The co-creators, Tony Holland and Julia Smith, had scripted the character with Treacher in mind. Treacher said in 2015 that he was initially reluctant to sign up for the show as it meant long hours and a sizeable commute from his family home in Suffolk, but that he relented due to the chance of a steady income. He received much critical acclaim for the role, especially for his portrayal of Arthur's mental decline and subsequent nervous breakdown. The character also endured a succession of misfortunes, which included two short spells in prison, a persistent struggle with unemployment, his daughter Michelle's (Susan Tully) pregnancy at the age of 16, his son Mark's (Todd Carty) diagnosis with HIV, and a midlife crisis where he had an affair with Christine Hewitt (Elizabeth Power) which almost broke up his marriage to Pauline (Wendy Richard).

By 1995, Treacher had requested to be written out of the series, stating: "By the time I finished, even the sound of the theme music was making me feel ill. I felt depressed." He also stated in a 2003 BBC documentary interviewing past stars of the show that he felt "compelled" to leave with advancing age. He said the stress of a gruelling schedule working long hours on the show was affecting his health and that doctors told him that if he did not leave the job soon and relax, it would kill him.

=== Films ===
Treacher appeared in several films, most notably Pop Pirates (1984), The Musketeer (2001), Tale of the Mummy (1998), and George and the Dragon (2004).

=== Radio ===
Treacher was also an accomplished radio actor and appeared in a BBC Radio 4 play of the day, Bringing Eddie Home by John Peacock, based on a true story of the fight by East End couple Edna and Jack Wallace to get their son's body brought home from Aden, and the ensuing fight for the rights of British service personnel. Treacher played the role of the older Jack Wallace and the play also included other ex EastEnders actors Tilly Vosburgh, Edna Doré, Todd Carty and Joe Absolom.

=== Advertisements ===
In 1973, Treacher appeared in a British television commercial for the Austin Allegro motor car. In 1983, he appeared in another British television commercial, this time for Colgate toothpaste where he played a grocer. In 1984, he was a Beefeater in the Tower of London to Paul Hogan's tourist in a British television commercial for Foster's Lager. Also appeared in a Cadbury's commercial.

== Personal life, illness and death ==
Treacher was married to the Australian actress Katherine Kessey. They had two children: Jamie, who is also an actor, and Sophie, a production assistant. They lived in Suffolk.

In 2015, Treacher told the press that he suffered from ataxia, a degenerative disease that involves poor muscle control, hindering his balance and ability to walk. Treacher said that as a result of this he had fully retired and he sometimes had to rely on a wheelchair for mobility. He also said that he no longer watched EastEnders, calling it "a load of old rubbish these days".

Treacher died from pneumonia in hospital in Ipswich, Suffolk, on 5 November 2022, aged 92. In a statement announcing his death, his family confirmed that Treacher's health had been deteriorating for some time. His former EastEnders co-stars Gillian Taylforth, Adam Woodyatt and Letitia Dean paid tribute to him.
