= Episode 5408 =

2016 episode of EastEnders

- EastEnders episode
- Episode no.: Episode 5408
- Directed by: Richard Lynn
- Written by: Matt Evans
- Original air date: 24 December 2016
- Running time: 35 minutes

Guest appearance
- Cheryl Fergison as Heather Trott

Episode chronology
← Previous; Episode 5407	Next → Episode 5409

Episode 5408 of the BBC soap opera EastEnders aired on 24 December 2016 at 8:25pm. One of the main plots revolved around the closing of the Walford launderette, which had featured since EastEnders first episodes in 1985, and the forced retirement of its worker Dot Cotton (June Brown). In the episode, Dot is upset when nobody attends the party to mark the launderette's closing. The episode also featured the unannounced guest return of former character Heather Trott (Cheryl Fergison), whose voice is heard in a tape that Dot finds; the archived recordings of other former characters also are heard in the episode. The episode also started the exit storyline of Linda Carter, whose portrayer Kellie Bright went on maternity leave. Other plots included Phil Mitchell (Steve McFadden) isolating himself from his family, the final night of the Walford Christmas play and Stacey Slater's (Lacey Turner) turkey being ruined.

The episode also featured the debut of Jenna Russell as Michelle Fowler, an original EastEnders character who had departed in 1995. Michelle's original portrayer, Susan Tully, had refused to return, so producer Sean O'Connor decided to recast the role. Critics believed that viewers could be disappointed by the recast and called Dot's storyline emotional, expressing sympathy for the character. The closing of the launderette was described as being the end of an era by critics. Critics also noted how singer George Michael died hours after the episode's broadcast, which featured Heather – who was characterised as being his biggest fan – referencing the singer and his song "Last Christmas".

== Plot ==
Sharon Watts (Letitia Dean) is upset that Phil Mitchell (Steve McFadden), who is unwell with cirrhosis, has walked out on the family. Shirley Carter (Linda Henry) talks to Phil and berates him for leaving. The residents of Walford get ready for the final night of the Walford Christmas play. Carmel Kazemi (Bonnie Langford) invites Donna Yates (Lisa Hammond) to spend Christmas with her family. Dot Cotton (June Brown) prepares for her last day working at the launderette, and her step-granddaughter Abi Branning (Lorna Fitzgerald) helps her to prepare a farewell party to mark the closing, but she does not stay for the party itself as she leaves Walford to spend Christmas with her mother, disappointing Dot. Dot expects many residents to attend the party, but they are unable to due to various factors. Louise Mitchell (Tilly Keeper) and her stepmother Sharon have an argument in the café over Sharon letting Phil walk out the previous day. Phil goes to cemetery to put flowers on the grave of his mother, Peggy Mitchell (Barbara Windsor), where he bumps into Denise Fox (Diane Parish), who is visiting the grave of Kevin Wicks (Phil Daniels). Denise also berates Phil for walking out on his family and stays with him so that he does not do "something stupid". She later leaves, with Phil unaware that Denise is pregnant with his baby.

Whilst clearing out her belongings in the launderette, Dot finds a lost tape recording of Shirley and Heather Trott (Cheryl Fergison), who had put together a mixtape of Christmas songs as a Christmas present, and Dot becomes emotional listening to it. Heather begins the mixtape with Wham!'s "Last Christmas". As Dot closes the launderette for the final time, she hears the voices of people from her past, including Ethel Skinner (Gretchen Franklin), Pauline Fowler (Wendy Richard), Lou Beale (Anna Wing) and Jim Branning (John Bardon). Michelle Fowler (Jenna Russell) steps out of a taxi, having returned to Walford after leaving in 1995. Backstage at the play, Linda Carter (Kellie Bright) finds out that her mother Elaine Peacock (Maria Friedman) has had a stroke and she leaves to be with her, desperate to make sure that she is okay. Linda worries about leaving her family, but her husband Mick Carter (Danny Dyer) assures her that she is doing the right thing by going to Elaine. Stacey Slater (Lacey Turner) finds a cat eating her Christmas turkey and she angrily throws the food out. Someone is then seen viewing Stacey's social media post asking for an urgent Christmas turkey. Sharon is shocked when Phil returns home. He reveals to Denny that he saw him perform in the play, which is he happy about. Phil apologises to Sharon and gives her an eternity ring. An overwhelmed Sharon goes outside for air and starts crying. Michelle, her best friend, sees her and the pair have an emotional reunion.

== Development ==
Episode 5408 of the British soap opera EastEnders premiered on 24 December 2016 at 8:25pm. The episode is 35 minutes long. prior to the episode's broadcast, it was reported that one of the plots of the episode would feature a conversation between Phil Mitchell (Steve McFadden) and Denise Fox (Diane Parish), the former of whom wants to spend Christmas alone and also gets some tough love from Shirley Carter (Linda Henry) and "harsh words" from Denise. It had also been reported that Phil's actions would upset his family. The episode also took place during the final night of the Walford Christmas show involving several of the soap opera's characters.

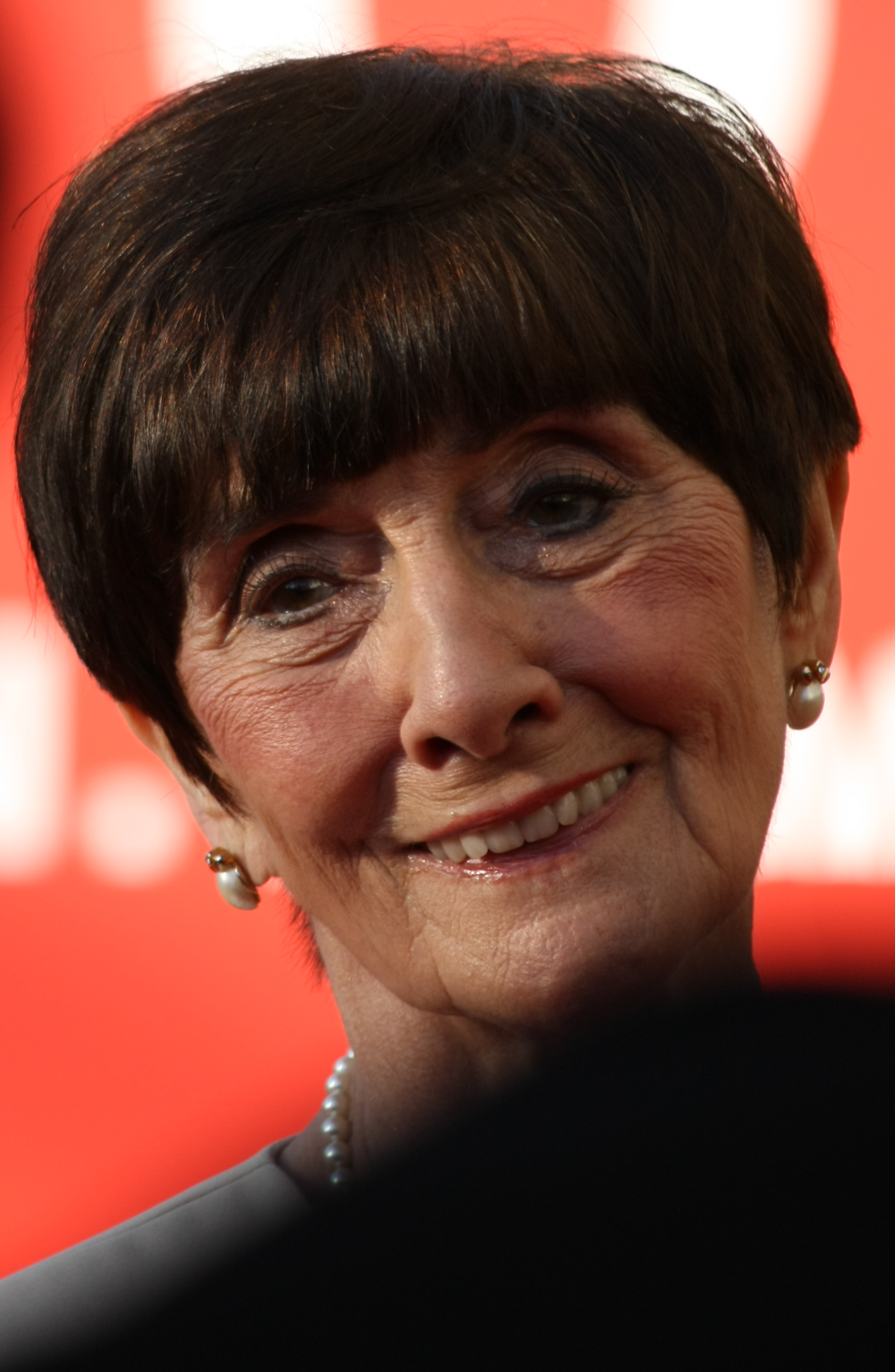
The episode featured Dot's retirement, portrayed by June Brown (pictured).

One of the episode's main plots revolved around Dot Cotton (June Brown) shutting up the launderette for the final time, marking an "the end of an era" due to it being part of the soap since its first episodes in 1985. Daniel Kilkelly from Digital Spy reported that the day would be "emotional" for Dot and questioned whether she would get the "send-off she deserves". Inside Soap reported that Dot does not want to retire and is already feeling alone due to having problems with her eyesight and having lost several friends in 2016, so "to have the door closed on the vocation she's enjoyed for decades makes it hard for Dot to feel any Christmas cheer at all". The magazine also teased that Dot would be "more isolated than ever" and that Christmas Eve would be "a day of sorrow" for her. Dot's step-granddaughter, Abi Branning (Lorna Fitzgerald) tries to help Dot by preparing a party to mark the launderette's closure. Dot appreciates the gesture, but is sad to find out that Abi will be away with her mum Tanya Branning (Jo Joyner) for Christmas. Eventually, none of Dot's friends attend her farewell party. As Dot leaves the launderette for the final time, she hears the voices of former characters Ethel Skinner (Gretchen Franklin), Pauline Fowler (Wendy Richard), Lou Beale (Anna Wing) and Jim Branning (John Bardon). Digital Spy called this a "poignant moment" of the episode.

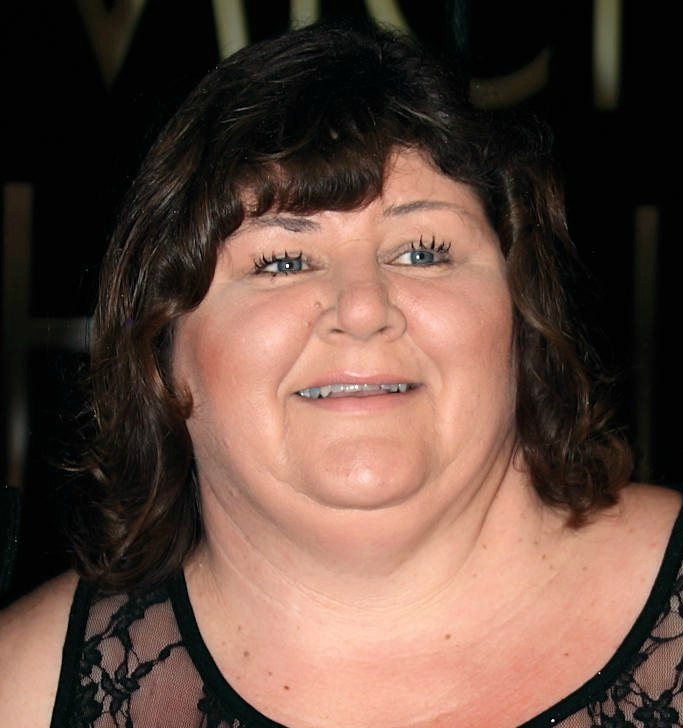
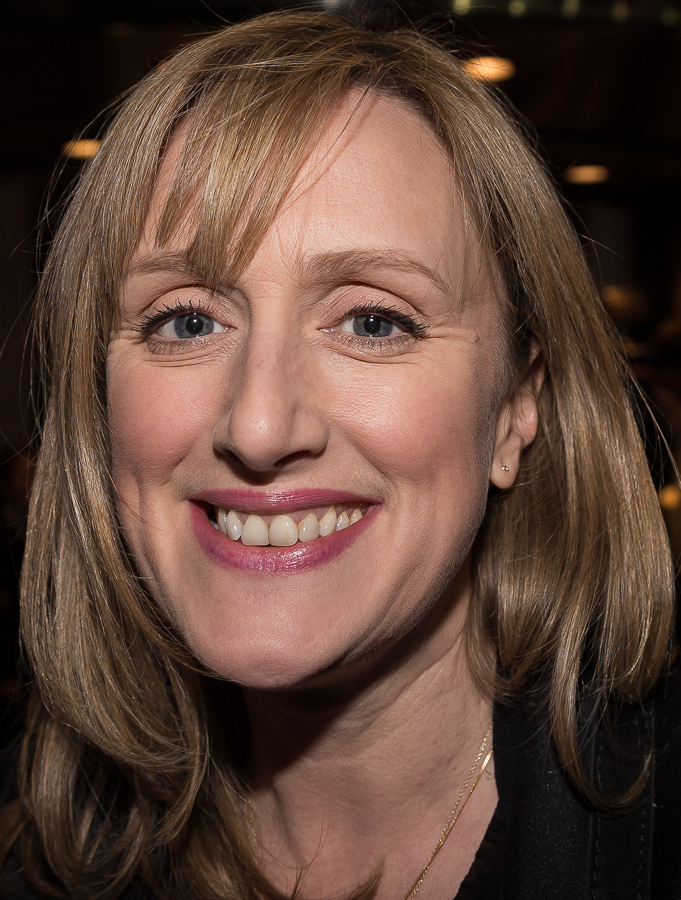
Cheryl Fergison (left) made an unannounced voice return, whereas Jenna Russell (right) made her first appearance in the episode.

Former character Heather Trott (Cheryl Fergison), who was killed-off in 2012, guest-starred in the episode. In the storyline, Dot is clearing out her belongings in the launderette and finds a lost tape recording of Heather and Shirly's mixtape of Christmas songs that they made for Dot as a Christmas present, and Dot becomes emotional when Heather plays Wham!'s Last Christmas. Heather's return had not been announced prior to the broadcast. It was assumed by Digital Spy that Fergison had returned to record the tape as she was credited for the role. Singer George Michael died on 25 December 2016, hours after the episode's broadcast, with Fergison posting a tribute for him on her Twitter following the announcement due to the pair being a fan of each other's work. The Daily Record and Daily Mirror noted how Heather had gushed in the episode that it would not be Christmas "without a bit" of his music, and how Heather was his "biggest fan" and she had become "synonymous with her love for George" during her original stint, having even named her son, George Trott, after him.

The episode also included the temporary exit storyline of Kellie Bright as Linda Carter, who had announced in May 2016 that she would be maternity leave. In the episode, Linda is upset and worried when she finds out that her mother Elaine Peacock (Maria Friedman) has had a stroke in Spain and so she leaves to be with her. Linda worries about leaving her family, but her husband Mick Carter (Danny Dyer) assures her that she is doing the right thing by going to Elaine. It had previously been teased that Linda would receive bad news during the Christmas show. Although Linda departs with her son Johnny Carter (Ted Reilly), they both appeared in the following episode broadcast on Christmas Day 2016.

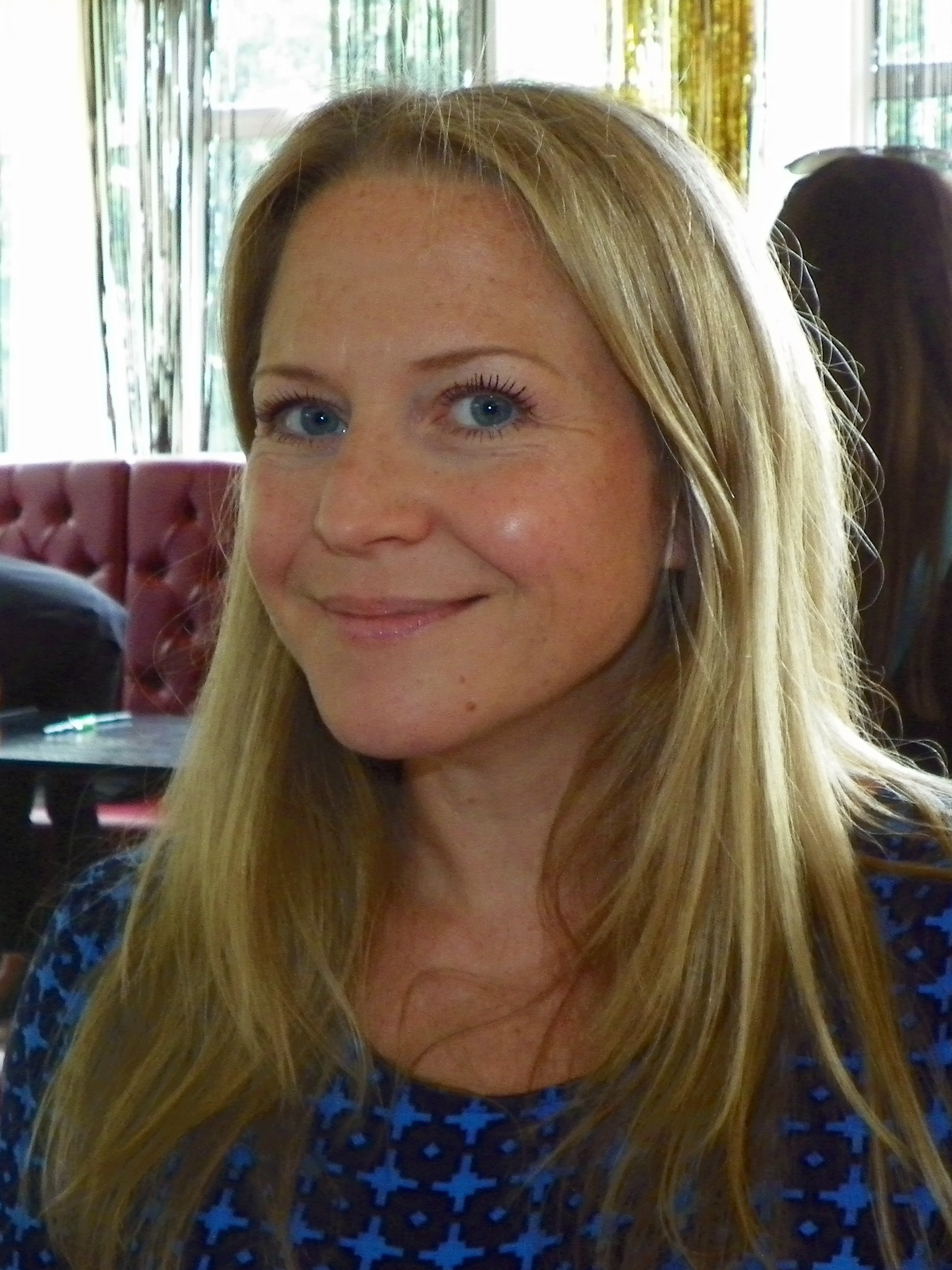
The episode facilitated the temporary exit storyline for Kellie Bright.

The episode also featured the return of original character Michelle Fowler after a 21-year absence, with Jenna Russell stepping into the role. The role had originally been portrayed by Susan Tully from EastEnders' first episode in 1985 to October 1995. The recast had been reported the day before the episode was broadcast, but her debut date was not confirmed until the transmission of the episode. Producers had repeatedly asked Tully – who had retired from acting – to return, which she had declined, so they chose to recast the role. Russell was glad to step into the role as Michelle had been her favourite EastEnders character growing up, and she was "excited" to see what was in store for the character. The actress added, "It is a great honour to play such an iconic character. I know the audience loved Michelle Fowler so much, and even though she hasn't been on our screen for twenty years, she's very much in the fans' psyche". Executive producer Sean O'Connor had Russell in mind when he decided to recast the character as he had worked with the actress before. He believed that the audience would take "Michelle back into their hearts", calling her "still flawed, complicated and infuriating" but still "loveable" after more than 20 years offscreen. He also called Michelle one of the soap's "most celebrated characters" and that Albert Square, the fictional setting of EastEnders, had "missed" her over in her absence. The reasons for Michelle's return was not revealed in the episode and it confirmed that the revelations would take place in a special episode airing in January 2017. Following the broadcast of Episode 5408, the official BBC website welcomed back Michelle to the soap opera and released more details on her return, including information from Russell and O'Connor on the recast. The character had been referenced onscreen earlier in 2016, particularly around a storyline involving the introduction of her son, Mark Fowler (Ned Porteous).

== Reception ==
Following the broadcast of the episode, Nicola Agius from the Daily Mirror wrote that "Christmas Eve was an eventful day for the residents of [EastEnders setting] Albert Square". Agius also wrote that Heather and Shirley's mixtape had a "sweet message" that put a "smile" on Dot's face, and she wrote "Of course" to Heather including a George Michael song due to her crush on him. She added that it was unfortunate for viewers that "Walford legend" Heather would not be returning permanently to the soap due to being killed-off. She also found the scenes of Dot shutting up the launderette emotional. Hayley Minn of the Daily Record noted how Heather had referenced George Michael in the episode just hours before his death, which she called an "eerie coincidence". Charlotte Tutton from OK! also found the coincidence eerie and noted how viewers voiced their opinions about it on Twitter, with some wondering how Heather would have reacted to the news.

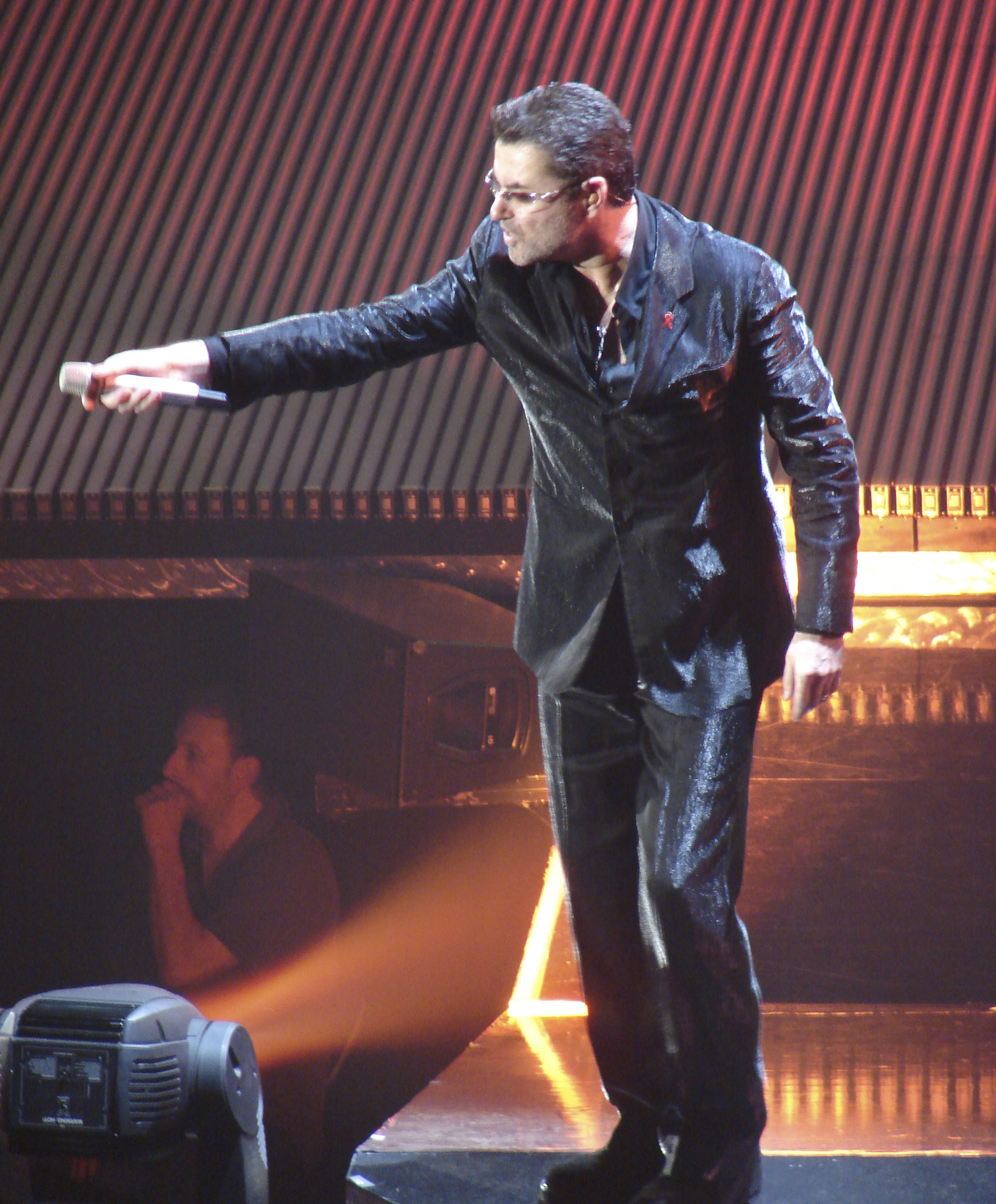
George Michael died hours after the episode's broadcast, which referenced the singer.

Sam Warner from Digital Spy wrote that viewers were given "quite the twist" by Heather's surprise return in the episode. Warner believed believed Dot would not have a good Christmas due to nobody attending her goodbye party. Warner also added that Dot was "given a poignant moment" in the episode when she heard the voices of several former characters. Warner's colleague, Daniel Kilkelly, included the episode and Michelle's "shock" recast on his list of EastEnders's "biggest and best moments" of 2016, writing that "producers finally accepted there was no chance of luring back" Tully. A reporter from the Daily Record believed that it was inevitable that the "legendary" Michelle would return to the soap opera and speculated that viewers would be disappointed with the recast, though added that Russell would "usher in a new age for the much loved character". The BBC called Michelle's return a "shock" and called her reunion with Sharon "emotional". They also called Phil's eternity ring present "touching".

Warner's colleague, Daniel Kilkelly, called the return of "iconic" and "legendary" Michelle as "very exciting" and called the scene where she reunites with Sharon as "genuinely heartwarming". He added, "Adding some extra intrigue for EastEnders fans, the reasons for Michelle's return may not be as simple as just wanting to spend time with her family this Christmas". He also wondered why Michelle had returned. Kilkelly also believed that it had been a "lonely few weeks" for Dot, which was "topped off" by nobody attending the party. Rachel McGrath from HuffPost noted that Dot's storyline in the episode would not be cheerful. Kate White from Inside Soap called Dot's party a "modest buffet". She commenting how it was sad to see Dot so alone and questioned whether anyone would realise "how much she needs her friends". A writer called the closing of the launderette a major event and wondered how the residents would cope, and how the "queen of the machines" Dot would fare without a job.
