= Heather Trott =

Fictional character from EastEnders

- EastEnders character
- Portrayed by: Cheryl Fergison
- Duration: 2007–2012, 2016
- First appearance: Episode 3389; 26 June 2007
- Last appearance: Episode 4396; 21 March 2012 (appearance); Episode 5408; 24 December 2016 (voiceover)
- Created by: Diederick Santer
- Introduced by: Diederick Santer (2007); Sean O'Connor (2016)
- Spin-off appearances: EastEnders: E20 (2010)
In-universe information
- Other names: Heather Peterson
- Occupation: Laundrette assistant; Shop assistant; Café worker; Cleaner
- Mother: Queenie Trott
- Husband: Minty Peterson (2008–2009)
- Sons: George Trott

Heather Trott (also Peterson) is a fictional character from the BBC soap opera EastEnders, played by Cheryl Fergison. She made her first appearance on 26 June 2007. The character was introduced as a guest character, but later became a regular. The sidekick of established character Shirley Carter (Linda Henry), most of Heather's storylines involved comedy, and Fergison won the 'Funniest Performance' award at the 2008 Inside Soap Awards. Heather's character is known for her headbands, love of cheese and karaoke, impeccable manners, and being a fan of singer George Michael.

In 2009, the character was involved in a whodunnit-style storyline when she became pregnant by an unknown man. Several characters were named as possibilities, and the father, teenager Darren Miller (Charlie G. Hawkins) was revealed after the baby, George Trott, was born. She made her final screen appearance on 21 March 2012 as a corpse, after being killed by Ben Mitchell (Joshua Pascoe). Fergison returned to record a voiceover as Heather, which was broadcast on 24 December 2016.

== Creation and development ==
=== Casting and introduction ===
Heather was introduced in June 2007 and was originally only meant to be a guest character, but Fergison's contract was extended to six months after the character proved popular. She was introduced as the sidekick of Shirley Carter, played by Linda Henry. After the success of her initial guest appearance, the character officially became "semi-regular", meaning she would show up on-screen occasionally; however, after September 2007, the character became a regular, moving to the soap's setting of Albert Square. Fergison was surprised at winning the role, stating that "On my first day on set, I went and took a seat on Arthur's bench. My mum had passed away, so I wanted to have a little chat with her. I sat there and said 'I can't believe we're finally here, Mum—this is just amazing'. It was a strange experience, because I knew she was there with me. She'd be so proud now." Fergison also discussed her relationship with the cast members she worked with most closely at the time, declaring that: "We're being called 'The Famous Five'. That's me, Cliff Parisi (Minty Peterson), Linda Henry (Shirley Carter), Bobby Davro (Vinnie Monks) and Ricky Groves (Garry Hobbs). Linda and I laugh all day, every day—this is the best job in the world. [...] Being on EastEnders is a privilege."

=== Personality and appearance ===
Fergison initially thought Heather was quite childlike, but was pleased that the show had "the courage to employ a bigger woman." She explained that viewers would realise that her size is due to her mother: "It could be perceived [that the character was just about her size], but when you look into the character, there is more depth to her—she's got a terrible mother, there's her background, and so on. You see her eating and, hopefully, people are intelligent enough to go, 'Ah, we can see why she does that.' [...] I'm hoping people will see it's not just about what she looks like. You don't have to be a big person to know that people comfort eat, or to say, 'These terrible things happen in life, that's why she behaves like that.'" Fergison explained that there are many levels to Heather's personality. She is a loyal friend who will do anything for anybody, and has low moments along with "absolute highs". Fergison said she calls the character "Heather Hopeful" because of her optimism. She reiterated this in February 2011, saying that if Heather found luck and love, she would not be the same character.

Fergison also said that she does not mind that her character is mocked for her size, saying that it happens in real life to overweight people: "[I]t's about how you deal with it. You have to portray it as long as you can redress the balance in some way at some point. That didn't happen straight away and people said to me, 'Oh my God, she's just the fat person they take the mickey out of'. [...] It's about taking away what Heather looks like, taking away the layers and finding out what she is like underneath. I think that's what EastEnders is doing, and that's a good thing." She also praised the show for having an overweight character, comparing her to all the "tiny blondes" in teenage soap opera Hollyoaks, and said that people like that Heather is a normal character, which she opined has not been seen for a long time in soaps. She said that comments made to Heather did not upset her, because she was bullied at school for her weight: "I learned that if I was funny, then they would stop. Now I don't take anything personally."

The character is known for wearing headbands, usually with a matching handbag, and liking singer George Michael. Fergison revealed that the headbands were her idea, saying "I've given myself a bit of a headache [...], literally, wearing those things." She also says that she likes George Michael and was extremely pleased when she found out her character was a fan. Heather is also a fan of karaoke, and Fergison cites her first scene where she is singing in front of her fellow cast as embarrassing and strange.

=== Relationship with Minty Peterson ===
Discussing the storyline which sees Heather become romantically involved with Minty Peterson, Fergison has expressed her support for their relationship, stating that: "This is Heather's only chance in life to have a dream come true. She's always such a kind, positive person, and is always willing to try." She later said "I think Minty could be her soul mate, as they're very good friends. They know a lot about each other." Fergison revealed that she found filming the storyline difficult, describing it as an "emotional rollercoaster": "I was laughing and in my most happy element, and then the next minute I would be in tears. [...] A lot of the storyline is about rejection, and it's difficult to film those scenes all the time. I was shattered, but it's a great opportunity. [...] You can go through your whole career and not do as much as you would do in six months of a soap."

=== Pregnancy and motherhood ===
Executive producer Diederick Santer hinted at Heather's upcoming storyline in an interview before her pregnancy was revealed in 2009, saying "I think it's pretty clear why Heather's self-esteem is so low. It's a combination of her horrid mother, and now it's her friend Shirley who treats her like a child and sort of kills her with well-meant kindness. We've got a great story for Heather this year—something for the delightful Cheryl Fergison to really get hold of. Remember when [Heather] was in tears on Valentine's night in the loo at the R&R, and her lost yoghurt pot lid appeared under the door? That was the start of something which will see her get a much greater sense of herself, find an identity free of Shirley, and grow as a person in 2009."

Fergison disclosed that she was unaware of the identity of the father of Heather's baby, explaining that she was frustrated at not knowing, but eventually realised she liked that it was kept from her. The storyline gave a few hints to the father's identity, and Fergison was excited to find out. The actress deemed it "a bit of a risky storyline" because of Heather's association with more comedic plots, and suggested that viewers may find the pregnancy farcical due to the lack of build-up. She expressed the opinion it would be "brilliant" if Heather were to raise the baby with Shirley, as Heather would be scared of being a mother, but Shirley has brought up her own children so could help. However, she believed that Heather would be a great mother, saying "it's exactly what she needs and it's somebody who's going to love her." Scripts containing the name of the baby's father were censored or doctored to show the man's name as "George" due to the secrecy surrounding the storyline.

Betting on the identity of the child's father opened in July 2009, with Heather's ex-husband Minty starting as the favourite. Other contenders were the man she met in a nightclub Eddie (Will Chitty), Phil Mitchell (Steve McFadden), Darren Miller (Charlie G. Hawkins), Garry, Vinnie, Vinnie's son Callum Monks (Elliott Jordan), Billy Mitchell (Perry Fenwick), gay character Christian Clarke (John Partridge) and Charlie Slater (Derek Martin). Betting was suspended in August with Phil standing as the favourite. In September, the possible fathers were reduced to four: Phil, Minty, Darren and Billy. Heather gives birth in October 2009, and Fergison revealed to Digital Spy that the crew attempted to make Heather's waters breaking appear realistic by having her burst a balloon filled with water between her legs. In an interview with What's on TV magazine, Fergison compared George's birth to the birth of her own son, Alex, ten years previously: "It was the hardest two weeks of my working life. The script was a one-woman show and I kept thinking when I gave birth to my own son Alex, who's now 10, I never spoke, just screamed a lot! Alex came by Caesarean so I did have to push to a certain extent but I was totally exhausted filming this because I had to do it 50 times! By the end, people were saying I looked like a new mum who'd just given birth!" Heather then decides to tell the father about the baby. Fergison said the writing had been clever, as the four "suspects"—Minty, Phil, Darren and Billy—are seen with their phones ringing, and Heather leaves a voicemail on the fathers's phone. Then each potential father goes to the hospital for various reasons.

In December 2009, Santer was asked what his favourite storyline of the year had been. He replied "I loved the way the 'Who's The Daddy?' story with Heather played, too. As time goes on, I expect we'll discover more about what happened that night. It makes sense to me—he's a horny, drunk 18-year-old! Everyone thinks that they did it in the [toilet] cubicle, but it's surely clear that they went home?" In May 2010, Fergison said that Heather would face problems as a single mother, promising a "shift in tone" for her storylines.

=== Financial and health problems ===
On 22 January 2011, it was reported by the Daily Mirror that an upcoming storyline would see Heather collapse after breathing toxic fumes from her faulty boiler, which she cannot afford to have repaired. A spokesperson told the newspaper that Heather hits rock bottom financially and is in desperate need of money, but is too proud to admit it to anybody. The 15 February 2011 episode centres on Heather's everyday life and the problems she faces. Following her collapse, Heather allows George to stay with Darren and his girlfriend Jodie Gold (Kylie Babbington) out of desperation, but she grows jealous seeing them playing happy families, not realising that Darren is struggling to cope. She decides she wants George back but lets Darren keep him as she feels he is better off with him, even though she is heartbroken, and Darren does not want Heather to have George. Fergison said that Heather would not lose her son as long as she stands up for herself.

=== Departure and death ===
On 17 September 2011, Simon Boyle of the Daily Mirror announced Fergison would be leaving EastEnders in 2012. Daniel Kilkelly of Digital Spy later reported Heather would be murdered by Ben Mitchell (Joshua Pascoe) during an argument at her flat. Kilkelly revealed further details of Heather's exit on 11 March 2012. He reported that Heather would die when Ben hits her with a picture frame, causing her to fall back and hit her head on a kitchen counter. The attack is witnessed by Ben's friend, Jay Mitchell (Jamie Borthwick) and he, along with Phil Mitchell (Steve McFadden) help Ben cover up his crime. Heather made her final screen appearance on 21 March 2012. Fergison said that she found filming her exit emotional.

== Storylines ==
Heather is introduced as the best friend of Shirley Carter (Linda Henry), who loves cheese and karaoke, is a fan of George Michael and has asthma. She lives with her controlling and emotionally abusive mother Queenie Trott (Judy Cornwell) until she moves in with Shirley. Heather becomes friends with Hazel Hobbs (Kika Mirylees), who asks her to be the bridesmaid at her wedding to Minty Peterson (Cliff Parisi). Heather accepts, and enters them into a wedding competition. When Hazel leaves Minty, Heather pretends to be Hazel so they can remain in the competition and split the prize money. Minty and Heather grow closer, and on the eve of the wedding, Heather realises she has fallen in love with Minty and they later marry. However, Heather later files for annulment, as she and Minty did not consummate their marriage. Heather remains in love with Minty, but with no chance of a reconciliation, Shirley decides to cheer Heather up by taking her to visit the home of her idol George Michael. Shirley later discovers that the house they are trespassing in is in fact not George Michael's, but she keeps this information to herself. On a high, Heather decides to find herself a man at R&R, and Shirley hires a male escort to give her a good time. When Heather discovers this, she slaps Shirley across the face and runs to the toilets in tears. However, an unseen person goes in and comforts Heather, and they sleep together that night. After an argument with Phil Mitchell (Steve McFadden), Heather suffers an asthma attack. At the hospital, tests reveal that she is pregnant. Heather gives birth in hospital, she is surprised to be told she has had a boy. She names him George Michael Trott, after the singer. Heather phones the father to tell him he has a son, and it is revealed to be teenager Darren Miller (Charlie G. Hawkins). Darren makes it clear that he does not want to be a father to George, but says he will support Heather financially. When Darren's girlfriend Libby Fox (Belinda Owusu) finds out, she reveals to everyone that Darren is George's father. Libby's mother Denise Johnson (Diane Parish) then confronts Heather, and says she should not have used a child to make a child.

When Shirley moves in with Phil, Heather struggles financially on her own, so Billy Mitchell (Perry Fenwick) and Jay Brown (Jamie Borthwick) move in with her and George. Heather later makes plans to have George christened. Shirley moves back in when and Heather receives a letter from the bank saying they are repossessing the house as the landlord cannot make his mortgage repayments. Shirley suggests that they can squat in the flat but the flat is left alone and the bailiffs seize the house. Heather is upset when she hears Minty plans to marry Sam Mitchell (Danniella Westbrook) but Minty finds out that Sam is marrying him to keep him quiet. The next morning, Heather thinks the night before only happened because Minty was drunk. She finds George having breathing problems so takes him to the doctor, and is told he has a cold. Sam moves in with her newborn baby Richard after The Queen Victoria public house is destroyed by a fire (see Queen Vic Fire Week), and Heather worries that Sam will try to steal Minty away from her. However, Sam insists that she will be moving out soon, and tells Heather not to worry about Minty as he would not stray. She meets the vicar, Reverend Stevens (Michael Keating), about George's Christening, and later tries on her wedding dress, which Minty sees, however, Heather reveals she is making it into a Christening gown. During the Christening, Minty leaves abruptly and Heather follows him outside to see him kissing Sam. Sam insults Heather, saying she will always be second best, so Heather leaves in tears.

The next day, Heather is depressed but Shirley tells her to snap out of it, and buys her a soft toy for George. Heather finds a large amount of cash inside it, and Alfie Moon (Shane Richie) turns up looking for it. He charms her and she gives it to him, but he gives her some back to help her find a new place to live. She decides to move into a nearby flat, 1b Albert Square. Heather begins to suffer financially as she is unable to pay her council tax bill and all her money is being spent on childcare. Her boiler breaks down, causing her health to deteriorate. She attempts to steal from her colleague Dot Branning (June Brown) but changes her mind, however, Dot catches her returning the money, thinking she is taking it. Dot decides to take Heather to the Citizens Advice Bureau for financial help, who say she can pay in instalments. The next day, Heather has no electricity or heating in the flat and confronts Shirley about no longer being there for her. She leaves George while she goes to see her mother to borrow some money, but finds that Queenie has moved away. She rushes back remembering that she left George alone, and leaves him with Darren. Shirley arranges a private party for Heather at R&R and leaves her some money in payment for cleaning. Heather uses it to put money in her gas and electricity meters. She falls asleep, slowly being poisoned from carbon monoxide from her faulty boiler. The next day, Darren breaks into Heather's flat and finds her unconscious; she is rushed to hospital, where she recovers. Appalled after seeing the state of her flat, Darren takes the responsibility of caring for George, telling Heather that she can still have access. Heather looks after George for a day but decides to allow Darren to have him permanently as she feels it is best for George. Darren's fiancée Jodie Gold (Kylie Babbington) soon gives Darren an ultimatum, and when Darren struggles with George on his own, he scraps his plans for a residency order and returns George to Heather. Heather joins an internet dating website, and starts corresponding with a man named "Kevin68". Unknown to Heather, "Kevin68" is actually Ben Mitchell (Joshua Pascoe), and Jay joins in when he discovers what Ben is doing. Heather tracks down a mechanic named Kevin Flynn (Ben Frimstone), but it is not Kevin68. She receives another message, claiming to be from Kevin68's sibling, saying he died in a motor accident, leaving Heather very upset. Phil later mocks her, saying Kevin68 probably never existed, so Ben reveals that he was Kevin68. However, Heather forgives him.

When Heather goes on holiday to Southend-on-Sea, she meets Dot's nephew Andrew Cotton (Ricky Grover) and the two take a liking to each other, but Heather decides to not take things further when she sees how he treats his mother, Rose (Polly Perkins). When Darren announces he is moving away from Walford, he asks Heather to take good care of George, and gives her some money. The money enables Heather and George to move into their own flat, and Heather takes on a cleaning job at Janine Butcher's (Charlie Brooks) property maintenance firm. Andrew comes back to Walford and vows to Heather that he will make up for his past mistakes with her. Heather initially rejects him, but then they share a kiss, and spend Christmas with each other. Andrew later proposes and she accepts, and they have sex for the first time. When Andrew starts dieting, Rose accuses Heather of trying to change him, but Heather and Dot tell Rose she is bullying Heather. Rose says she wants to be sure they really want to get married, and they insist they are. Heather asks Patrick Trueman (Rudolph Walker) to give her away at the wedding and for Shirley to be her maid of honour.

At Heather's hen night, Andrew reveals he has a temper when he almost hits Shirley, but Heather stays with him. The following day, Heather attempts to reconcile with Shirley as she feels that the wedding will not be the same without her. However, Shirley rejects her. Ben believes Heather has overheard a conversation between him and Ian Beale (Adam Woodyatt) in which he confessed to wrongfully putting Phil in prison for murdering Stella Crawford (Sophie Thompson), and confronts her. Andrew gives Heather two train tickets and tells her to meet him at The Queen Vic by 6 pm if she wants to elope with him. Heather tries to reconcile with Shirley again, but is rejected. Heather decides to elope with Andrew and returns home to find the train tickets. Ben is arrested for perverting the course of justice and he goes to Heather's flat, believing she had reported him to the police due to her overhearing his and Ian's conversation earlier. He argues with Heather and starts looking for the money Dot gave to her so he can leave Walford. As Heather tries to stop him, Ben picks up a photo frame and hits her on the head with it, killing her. Phil enters the flat moments later and, upon finding Heather's body, covers up her death and swears Ben and Jay, who had witnessed the murder, to secrecy. A devastated Shirley later discovers Heather dead in her flat and becomes determined to find the killer. Andrew is arrested for Heather's murder, but is later cleared. Ben hides the murder weapon under his bed, and several months later, Jay finds it. Shirley eventually learns the truth when accusing Phil of killing Heather. Ben attempts to defend him, but instead he accidentally reveals vital information that only the murderer would know. Unbeknown to Phil and Shirley, Ben then goes to the police station and eventually confesses to Heather's murder. Ben's murder charge is dropped; he pleads guilty to manslaughter, and is sentenced to four years imprisonment.

In 2016, Dot retires from her job in the launderette and finds a mixtape made many years earlier by Heather and Shirley, featuring their voices and several Christmas songs.

== Other appearances ==
Heather also makes cameo appearances in the Internet spin-off series EastEnders: E20. In episode 2 of series 1, Shirley's niece Zsa Zsa Carter (Emer Kenny) runs into her and recognises George from a photo. In episode 3, Zsa Zsa visits Heather in the launderette and steals her purse while she is on the telephone. Leon Small (Sam Attwater) goes into the launderette, stripping to his boxer shorts and leaving Heather embarrassed. Heather realises her purse is missing, but Zsa Zsa returns it, saying she found it on the street. In episode 6, Heather asks Zsa Zsa to babysit George. In episode 9, she suggests that Zsa Zsa go back to stay with her mother after Shirley asks her to go home. She also appears in series 2, where in episode 3, Asher (Heshima Thompson) and Sol Levi (Tosin Cole) go into the launderette and she thinks they are going to rob her.

== Reception ==
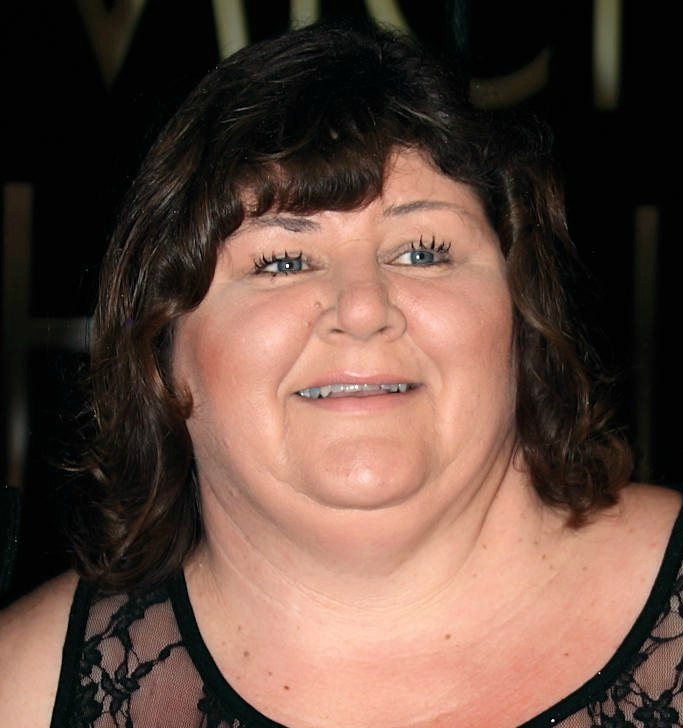
Cheryl Fergison (pictured) received praise for her portrayal of Heather.

The character of Trott was hailed by Mark Wright of The Stage as the "[television] stand out of 2007". He described her as "the divine, the wonderful, the brilliant Heather Trott, played to absolute perfection by actress Cheryl Fergison, and we have somebody new who the writers can engage with and, if they play it right, create a new soap legend." She was also described as a "legend" by Digital Spy's Kris Green and was nominated for 'Best Newcomer' and 'Best On-Screen Partnership' (with Shirley Carter) at the 2008 Digital Spy Soap Awards. She was also nominated for 'Best Comedy Performance' and 'Best On Screen Partnership' at the 2008 British Soap Awards, 'Best Newcomer' at the 2008 TV Quick and TV Choice Awards and won 'Funniest Performance' at the 2008 Inside Soap Awards. On Digital Spy's 2012 end of year reader poll, Heather's exit storyline came second in the "Best Storyline" category with 25.9% of the vote.

Fellow cast member Kara Tointon named Heather as her favourite character in the soap, explaining of her choice: "I think she brings something really great to the show, and not just the comedy—she's good at emotional scenes too. I love watching her." Garry Bushell, TV critic for the Daily Star, criticised Heather's appearance, dubbing her "Heifer" and referring to her as a "giant dumpling with eyes". Bushell found it implausible that Minty would kiss Heather, and later deemed her crush on Garry Hobbs "disturbing". A writer for the Daily Mirror also criticised her appearance: "Her frocks and matching Alice bands could have been stitched together out of Nigel Bates's old ties and if I was actress Cheryl Fergison I'd have cried myself to sleep every night—especially after the cruel Brighton episodes. Being fat made Heather fair game and you'd have cheered if Gok Wan had stormed a storyline conference and bitch-slapped the lot of them." The Guardian's Nancy Banks-Smith deemed Heather "a big girl with a heart to match". She approved of her marriage to Minty, however was critical of the execution of the wedding itself, writing: "Indeed, as the only two throughly [sic] nice people in Walford, she and Minty were made for each other. [...] EastEnders, who wouldn't recognise tender if they broke a toe on it, treated it all as a big joke."

In 2008, the character was criticised by private healthcare company Bupa, when they rated her one of television's most unhealthy characters due to her poor diet. Following the character's death, Alex Hardy of The Times wrote "[Heather] was just an accessory in her own murder, really, just as she was only an accessory in the five years she's been in the soap. This is a lady whose "big" storylines have included stealing cheese from the Minute Mart, being played by a bloke in Harry Hill's TV Burp, and keeping in her bra a yoghurt top that she'd nicked from George Michael's bin. Plot wise, she has long been a dead weight, so perhaps it's only right that she's now literally become one." While commenting on the character's death, a reporter from the Liverpool Daily Post said "Walford is better off without Heather Trott. Her character always struck me as one which the script-writers had come to regret. She was like a younger – and considerably larger – version of Rita Fairclough in Coronation Street." They added that she was the subject of the most random soap storylines since Bouncer was given a dream sequence in Neighbours. Kevin O'Sullivan from the Sunday Mirror said that "life extinct" was apt for Heather because she was the size of a dinosaur. He added that no one in Walford would really miss Heather. The writer also felt that the "massive Ms Trott was never much more a caricature simpleton whose love for George Michael and all things 80s retro was supposed to be side-splitting. But wasn't. Another cardboard cutout bites the dust."

In 2020, Sara Wallis and Ian Hyland from The Daily Mirror placed Heather 83rd on their ranked list of the best EastEnders characters of all time, calling her "Karaoke-obsessed".

== In popular culture ==
Heather was frequently parodied on Harry Hill's TV Burp where she was played by Steve Benham dressed up to look like her, often being used as a punchline whenever Harry Hill looked back on the events of the soap from the previous week that involved the character. At the end of TV Burp's final episode, which happened to coincide with the week in which Heather was killed off in EastEnders, Cheryl Fergison herself made a surprise guest appearance.

== See also ==
- List of EastEnders: E20 characters
