= Susan Tully =

English television actress, producer and director (born 1967)

- Born: Susan Lorna Tully; 20 October 1967 (age 58); London, United Kingdom
- Occupations: Actress, television producer, television director
- Years active: 1981–present

Susan Lorna Tully (born 20 October 1967) is a British actress, television producer and television director from London.

Tully's most prominent television acting roles have been those of rebellious teenager Suzanne Ross in Grange Hill and single mother Michelle Fowler in the BBC soap opera EastEnders. Tully played one of the original EastEnders characters, appearing in the first episode on 19 February 1985 and remaining central to the series until 26 October 1995.

Tully later gave up acting in favour of working behind the camera and since then has directed and produced British television programmes.

== Early life ==
Tully's father was a watch-case maker and her mother a housewife. Tully was brought up on a London council estate.

While at school in Barnsbury, Islington, Tully took up acting as a hobby and attended the Anna Scher children's theatre, which began a fast track into television work.

== Career ==
=== Acting ===
Aged nine, Tully hosted the television children's programme Our Show and later worked on The Saturday Banana with Bill Oddie.

Tully was cast in the BBC children's television serial Grange Hill. She played schoolgirl Suzanne Ross for three years (1981–1984). At the age of 17, Tully secured a major role in the BBC's new soap opera EastEnders. She played Michelle Fowler from the show's inception in 1985 until 1995. During her time on the show, her character became pregnant aged 16 after having an affair with the 39-year-old adulterer Den Watts. In December 2016, EastEnders recast the role of Michelle Fowler to actress Jenna Russell after Tully repeatedly turned down offers to return. The show's executive producer at the time, Sean O'Connor, has said that Tully gave her blessing for the recast to take place.

=== Directing and producing ===
In the late 1990s, Tully began concentrating on directing for television (credited as Sue Tully).

| Year | Title | Notes |
|---|---|---|
| 1998–1999 | EastEnders | 15 episodes |
| 1999–2004 | The Bill | 14 episodes. Also credited as producer on episodes 93, 94, 99, 100, 106, 107 |
| 2000 | Black Cab | 5 episodes |
| 2000–2001 | London's Burning | 4 episodes |
| 2002 | The Story of Tracy Beaker | 13 episodes |
| 2003 | M.I.T.: Murder Investigation Team | 1 episode: Lambs to the Slaughter |
| 2004 | 55 Degrees North | 2 episodes |
| 2005 | Twisted Tales | 3 episodes |
| 2005 | Funland | 4 episodes |
| 2006 | Drop Dead Gorgeous | 3 episodes |
| 2006 | Goldplated | 2 episodes |
| 2006–2007 | The Chase | 5 episodes |
| 2007 | Secret Diary of a Call Girl | 4 episodes |
| 2008–2011 | Silent Witness | 6 episodes |
| 2009 | Theatre Live! | 1 episode: Too Many Cooks |
| 2009 | Blue Murder | 2 episodes |
| 2009–2011 | Lark Rise to Candleford | 9 episodes |
| 2012 | Stella | 4 episodes |
| 2012 | Good Cop | 2 episodes |
| 2012 | The Paradise | 2 episodes |
| 2012 | Getting On | 6 episodes |
| 2013 | Truckers | 2 episodes |
| 2014 | The Mill | 2 episodes |
| 2014 | Puppy Love | 6 episodes |
| 2015 | Crossing Lines | 4 episodes |
| 2016 | The Musketeers | 2 episodes |
| 2016–2017 | The A Word | 4 episodes |
| 2018 | Britannia | 1 episode: Honor and Betrayals |
| 2019 | Tin Star | 2 episodes |
| 2019 | Line of Duty | 2 episodes |
| 2020 | Strike: Lethal White | 4 episodes |
| 2021 | Too Close | 3 episodes |
| 2022 | Strike: Troubled Blood | 4 episodes |
| 2023 | Maryland | |
| 2024 | Strike: The Ink Black Heart | 4 episodes |

== Personal life ==
Tully is a supporter of the Meningitis Trust and she has also been involved in the Comic Relief fundraising event. She is a close friend of Letitia Dean, who played her best friend Sharon Watts in EastEnders. Tully was a bridesmaid at Dean's wedding to Jason Pethers in 2002.
