= Michelle Fowler =

Fictional character from EastEnders

- EastEnders character
- Susan Tully as Michelle Fowler (1995)
- Portrayed by: Susan Tully (1985–1995); Jenna Russell (2016–2018)
- Duration: 1985–1995, 2016–2018
- First appearance: Episode 1 "Poor Old Reg"; 19 February 1985
- Last appearance: Episode 5691; 17 April 2018
- Created by: Tony Holland
- Introduced by: Julia Smith (1985); Sean O'Connor (2016)
- Jenna Russell as Michelle Fowler (2016)
In-universe information
- Other names: Michelle Holloway
- Occupation: Receptionist; Trainee hairdresser; Barmaid; Housing officer; Teacher; Sales assistant; Private tutor
- Family: Fowler/Beale
- Father: Arthur Fowler
- Mother: Pauline Fowler
- Brothers: Mark Fowler; Martin Fowler
- Husband: Lofty Holloway (1986–1988); Tim Andrews (1996–2017)
- Sons: Mark Fowler Jnr
- Daughters: Vicki Fowler
- Grandfathers: Albert Beale
- Grandmothers: Lou Beale
- Uncles: Pete Beale; Kenny Beale
- Nephews: Roman Allen
- Nieces: Bex Fowler; Hope Fowler
- First cousins: David Wicks; Ian Beale; Elizabeth Beale

Michelle Fowler (also Holloway) is a fictional character from the BBC soap opera EastEnders, originally portrayed by Susan Tully from the show's first episode on 19 February 1985 until the character's departure on 26 October 1995. She returned for a second stint between 24 December 2016 and 17 April 2018 with the role recast to Jenna Russell. The character of Michelle is explored through her longstanding companionship with best friend Sharon Watts (Letitia Dean).

In her first major storyline, Michelle ended up getting pregnant aged 16 and it was soon revealed that the father of her baby was in fact Sharon's adopted father Den Watts (Leslie Grantham). The follow-up of this revelation explored Michelle's secret relationship with Den prior to her giving birth to their daughter, Vicki Fowler (Scarlett Alice Johnson). Other storylines have included a problematic marriage to Lofty Holloway (Tom Watt); helping nurse her aunt Kathy Beale (Gillian Taylforth) back to health following the latter's rape ordeal from her boss James Willmott-Brown (William Boyde); briefly falling out with Sharon after the truth of Vicki's parentage and Michelle's dalliance with Den is exposed; becoming the mistress of Danny Whiting (Saul Jephcott); and getting stalked by her ex-boyfriend Jack Woodman (James Gilbey).

Soon afterwards, Michelle was embroiled in an intense feud with her nemesis and Sharon's hardman husband Grant Mitchell (Ross Kemp). The rivalry between them escalated in light of events that saw Michelle display opposition towards Grant over his domestic violence towards Sharon, getting shot by his psychotic old army friend Dougie Briggs (Max Gold) during a hostage siege at the Queen Victoria public house, becoming the first before anybody else to learn about Sharon's affair with Grant's brother Phil (Steve McFadden), coping with Sharon's exit as a result of her marriage with Grant falling apart, and having a one-night stand with Grant during a four-hander episode before she is later revealed to be pregnant with his baby.

Following the recast to Russell in 2016, Michelle's storylines revolved around her having had an illegal relationship with her American student Preston Cooper (Martin Anzor); a love triangle involving her niece Bex Fowler (Jasmine Armfield) and Preston; stealing Phil's car in a drunken stupor that results in her crashing the vehicle into the local chip shop; having to take care of Phil's daughter Louise Mitchell (Tilly Keeper) and Sharon's son Denny Rickman (Bleu Landau) on her own when the couple later go on holiday; and being hassled by her old acquaintance Tom Bailey (Daniel Casey) over his scheme to defraud her.

== Creation ==
Michelle Fowler is one of the original 23 characters invented by the creators of EastEnders, Tony Holland and Julia Smith. Michelle is a member of the first family of EastEnders, the Beales and Fowlers and Holland took the inspiration for some of the series' earliest characters from his own London family and background. Michelle's original character outline as written by Smith and Holland appeared in an abridged form in their book, EastEnders: The Inside Story.

"Michelle has another year of schooling...Michelle is more on the straight and narrow...Unlike her brother, she gets the things she wants, by doing part-time work. "Saturday girl" at the local hairdressers, and two late shifts a week at a hamburger place. She's into Reggae." (page 55)

Holland and Smith wanted the character to be feisty and emotionally strong. They had been introduced to the young actress Susan Tully when they attended an open evening at the Anna Scher Theatre School in North London. They were extremely impressed with her "natural and unaffected" acting abilities and felt she displayed hidden depths of emotion. Despite their interest, both Holland and Smith were hesitant about casting her because she was already widely known for playing the student Suzanne Ross in the children's television show Grange Hill. Nevertheless, she was asked to audition for the role of Michelle and was informed of the intention to make the character a pregnant schoolgirl. Tully liked the story and liked the fact that the character was going to keep the baby, but what interested her most was the opportunity to allow the character to grow up on screen, something she was unable to do with her Grange Hill character. Although Julia Smith initially feared that Tully was too well known to play the part, they eventually decided to use this fact to their advantage. Tully had a huge following from Grange Hill, and they felt that those fans would be likely to tune in to EastEnders, so she was offered the part.

== Development ==
Michelle as she appeared in 1985, played by Susan Tully

Early in the series, the character of Michelle became central to the programme and was the focus of a controversial storyline involving her teenage pregnancy. Press interest in the show escalated to "record levels" as journalists continuously tried to guess who had fathered her baby. In whodunit fashion, the audience had been kept in the dark as to the father's identity and were offered teasers implicating several Square residents. The culprit was finally exposed in October 1985 on episode 66. Written by series co-creator/script editor Tony Holland and directed by co-creator/producer Julia Smith, it was considered to be a landmark episode in the show's history. 4 possible suspects were seen leaving the Square in the episode's first half: Tony Carpenter (Oscar James), Ali Osman (Nejdet Salih), Andy O'Brien (Ross Davidson), and Den Watts (Leslie Grantham). As Michelle waited by their rendezvous point, a car pulled up and the fluffy white legs of Roly the poodle bounded out of the car, revealing that the man who was meeting Michelle, the father of her baby, was Den Watts. The rest of the episode was one long scene of Den and Michelle discussing whether or not to keep the baby. Until that time, that 15-minute scene was the longest ever done on a soap opera. Writer Colin Brake has suggested that this was a bold experiment for a series that had established a reputation, in its first 8 months, for being fast-moving and rapidly cut. It relied on only 1 story and 2 actors to hold the audience for over half an episode. Tony Holland's handling of the awkward scene between a teenage girl and her best friend's father is considered one of the highlights of the programme's first year. The finishing touch was the use of alternative end-title music, "Julia's Theme", a variation of the usual one which replaced the dramatic drum beats with a longer, gentler piano-solo introduction.

The following year Michelle and Lofty's (Tom Watt) church wedding was another target of press speculation before the episodes aired. According to Holland and Smith, they wanted to know two things: the design of Michelle's dress, and whether she'd jilt Lofty at the altar. The wedding was shot in a church in private grounds to which the press would not have access. But the press still assembled in large numbers, and security people had to be hired to keep camera people away from the story action. Huge lorries were parked in front of the church's entrance so nothing could be seen, and the cast arrived in disguise. Finally strong lights were shone into the eyes of the journalists and photographers, making them angry, and they tried to gain access to the grounds by breaking the security barrier and telling the production team that they were extras needed inside the church. The entire episode, written by David Ashton, was devoted to Lofty and Michelle's wedding day. Brake has said that at the time it was deemed one of the best cliffhangers of the series, with the episode ending as the bride arrives at the church door and hesitates. The birth of Michelle and Den's daughter, and Michelle and Lofty's eventual marriage, helped to consolidate a fast-growing audience. According to Holland and Smith, "The young couple had come together under enormously difficult circumstances". The subsequent storylines were built to keep the audience guessing about the future of their relationship. Had they married for the wrong reasons? Would the relationship survive? What would happen if Lofty wanted his own child?

Michelle did become pregnant by Lofty, and in another controversial storyline she had an abortion behind Lofty's back in January 1988. The episode, written by Tony McHale, was screened on the same day that a private member's bill was discussed in the House of Commons, which sought to reduce the number of weeks following conception in which an abortion can be carried out.

An April 1989 two-hander episode in which Michelle confessed Vicki's paternity to her best friend Sharon Watts (Letitia Dean) returned to a model established by the first Den-and-Angie (Anita Dobson) solo episode, with revelations and major character changes to an important relationship. According to Brake, this episode was held in high regard by the programme's producers, directors, and writers and gave Tully and Dean the chance to demonstrate how much they had grown as actresses during their 4 years on the show.

Michelle went on to feature in controversial storylines such as her daughter's kidnapping, a shooting, and a brief liaison with her best friend's ex-husband and her own nemesis Grant Mitchell (Ross Kemp) — which left her pregnant. This heralded one of the soap's best-kept secrets as Grant never discovered that Michelle had his child. Michelle remained central to the programme for 10 years and became one of the most popular characters of her time. She was written out of it in 1995 when Tully decided to move on. Tully since took up directing, and directed several episodes of EastEnders.

=== Reintroduction ===
In May 2016, it was reported that the outgoing executive producer of EastEnders, Dominic Treadwell-Collins, had tried to get Tully to return to the show, saying "[we] emailed back and forth, but she's a director now. I briefly considered a recast, but it just didn't sit right. And you never know, maybe someone else can woo Sue Tully to come back." He added, "Michelle carries the one unexploded secret—the child. But there are ways around that! So, yes, it was one of my original ideas—bringing Michelle in and the secrets she brings. I love secrets." Instead, Treadwell-Collins introduced Michelle's son with Grant, Mark Fowler, played by Ned Porteous. Tully had also been approached several times in the preceding 20 years to return to EastEnders, but had rejected each offer. These included offers to return for the funerals of Arthur, Pauline and Mark, as well as the weddings of Mark and Martin.

On 23 December 2016, a day before her return on in Episode 5408, it was reported that Michelle would be returning, but that the part had been recast to Jenna Russell. Of her casting, Russell said: "It is a great honour to play such an iconic character. I know the audience loved Michelle Fowler so much, and even though she hasn't been on our screen for 20 years, she's very much in the fans' psyche. When I used to watch EastEnders all those years ago, she was one of my favourite characters. I'm extremely excited for what is in store for Michelle." Executive producer Sean O'Connor said he is "thrilled to have secured Jenna Russell to play Michelle Fowler, one of the show's most celebrated characters" and "the Square really has missed her over the past twenty years." O'Connor added, "Jenna was always in mind when I first started planning for Michelle's return". O'Connor also said Michelle is "still flawed, complicated and infuriating after two decades away, but still loveable all the same. It's going to be appointment TV watching Michelle's car crash of a life unravel all over again."

O'Connor also said Letitia Dean was "absolutely thrilled, because she [Dean] and Jenna were in the same year at drama school together as children. So we're articulating a 30 year old relationship between these two women, and that's something that they already have." and "there's a genuine affectionate recognition in that from Adam [Woodyatt] for Jenna, because they've known each other for such a long time. Again, it shows—I think that for Jenna, being part of EastEnders has been the destiny of her career." Tully "gave the idea" of recasting Michelle "her blessing, and it was really delightful when she did." Tully was also involved in telling O'Connor, Russell and the writing team about Smith and Holland's original ideas for Michelle.

=== Departure (2018) ===
On 19 March 2018, it was announced that Russell would be leaving the show after fifteen months. Her departure was reportedly a result of a mutual decision between Russell and show bosses. An official EastEnders spokesperson said: "Jenna is a terrific actress who has loved her time on the show playing Michelle and it was a mutual decision to write the character out. We wish Jenna all the best for the future." Russell's exit aired on 17 April 2018.

== Storylines ==
=== 1985–1995 ===
Michelle makes her first appearance in the first episode as a member of the longstanding Beale/Fowler family. She is best friends with Sharon Watts (Letitia Dean). At one point, they competed against each other for the affections of local schoolboy Kelvin Carpenter (Paul J. Medford), but the romance quickly fizzled out.

Not long after turning 16, Michelle discovers that she is pregnant; she refuses to name the father of her child or have an abortion despite pressure from her family, instead becoming adamant that she is keeping her baby. Speculation persists as to the identity of the father of Michelle's baby and he is eventually revealed as Sharon's 39-year-old adoptive father — Den Watts (Leslie Grantham). Soon afterwards, Michelle turned to Den for sympathy during a difficult time and they end up having a one-night stand despite Den already being married with his alcoholic wife Angie (Anita Dobson). At one point, Den and Michelle secretly meet up at a canal away from the prying eyes of Walford. Den thereupon promises to provide financial support for Michelle and their child, as well as keep the baby's paternity a secret.

The following year, Michelle struggles with the hardships of being a pregnant teenager. Restricted from the youthful pursuits of her peers, she becomes depressed. She turns to kind-hearted barman Lofty Holloway (Tom Watt) who eventually falls in love with her. Lofty soon proposes marriage to Michelle and offers to raise her child as his own. Although she initially refuses, she eventually accepts. That May, she gives birth to her daughter, Vicki. On the day she is due to marry Lofty, however, Michelle has second thoughts and ultimately realises that she does not love Lofty, due to her being unable to overcome her feelings for Den.

After meeting up with Den before the ceremony, Michelle ends up jilting Lofty at the altar. Later that year, she changes her mind again and Lofty whisks her away for a secret wedding outside Walford. However, their marriage breaks down as Michelle grows tired of Lofty after he pressures her to let him to adopt Vicki legally before asking to have another baby. Michelle does not like either idea, but after an ill-fated attempt to elope with Den, she settles for an unhappy life with Lofty and ends the year pregnant with Lofty's baby.

Lofty is overjoyed and, against Michelle's wishes, ends up telling everyone about her pregnancy. Michelle retaliates by quietly having a private abortion funded by Den, who helps her out upon stating that he never wanted Lofty to adopt Vicki to begin with. When Lofty learns the truth about Michelle aborting their child, he confronts her and their row turns physical in front of their family; Lofty then leaves Walford after his marriage with Michelle dissolves completely.

While striving to move forward from Lofty and the abortion of their child, Michelle gives moral support to her aunt Kathy Beale (Gillian Taylforth), after finding out that she had been raped by her boss, James Willmott-Brown (William Boyde). She convinces Kathy to report James to the police, and he is eventually taken into custody before being charged with rape. At one point, Michelle confronts James on the Square for what he did, and promises that he will go down for raping Kathy.

For the next few months, Michelle and her family stand up for Kathy when each of them has to give evidence in court regarding the incident of her rape. Despite some complications amid the circumstances, they successfully help Kathy get justice after James is found guilty of rape and sentenced to three years in prison.

By 1989, Michelle's relationship with Den has come to an end after Den gets himself in trouble with The Firm, a gangland organization with whom he is involved. While on the run from The Firm, Den is able to help Michelle acquire a flat for herself alongside both Vicki and Sharon. He then turns himself into the police to halt The Firm's manhunt on him, leading to a spell in prison.

However, after it transpires to Den that The Firm has resolved to kill him at all costs, he escapes from custody and requests that Michelle meet up with him at the canal. She agrees, and goes to the location where Den is hiding, but does not realise that she is under surveillance from The Firm. At the canal, Michelle tells Den that she will wait for him and that one day they will be together with Vicki as a family. They bid an emotional farewell to each other, with Den telling Michelle to "be lucky", before she then leaves to return to Walford; moments after Michelle leaves, however, Den ends up getting shot by a Firm member concealing a gun in a bunch of daffodils and falls into the canal.

With Den presumed dead, Michelle and Sharon are distraught. When a witness says Den had been seen with a mystery woman on the day he got shot, Sharon ponders who it was and soon learns from Michelle's response that she knows something. When Sharon confronts her over this, Michelle admits that she met Den; she then proceeds to reveal that Den is Vicki's father, thus exposing the secrecy of their relationship to Sharon. Feeling hurt and angry over being lied to, Sharon refuses to accept Michelle's explanation, and berates her for the deception before walking out.

It is by this point that Michelle's parents have learned the truth about her and Den as well. Michelle's mother Pauline (Wendy Richard) is the first to discover this back in 1986, confronting Michelle about it after slapping Den over the revelation. Eventually, Michelle's father Arthur (Bill Treacher) discovers the truth behind Vicki's parentage as well after accidentally walking in on a conversation between his wife and daughter over Den. In response, Arthur reacts with fury and has a mental breakdown.

In light of Sharon's discovery of this revelation, she and Michelle become estranged for months, until Vicki ends up contracting meningitis later that year; Michelle's worry over Vicki's health brings her closer to Sharon, and they eventually reconcile by the time Vicki has recuperated.

As time goes on, Michelle finds herself involved in another marriage, this time with a computer salesman named Danny Whiting (Saul Jephcott). This first emerged when Whiting told Michelle that his previous marriage was over after being unable to make amends with his ex-wife. Michelle soon plans to move to Newcastle with Whiting, but she ends up changing her mind; Whiting, though, appears unwilling to accept her decision.

Michelle moves in with Rachel Kominski (Jacquetta May), a lecturer who persuades Michelle to resume her studies and enroll at university. Michelle and Rachel become inseparable, and rumours about their sexuality prompt Michelle to start dating Clyde Tavernier (Steven Woodcock), a fellow single parent. Some of the Albert Square residents, including Arthur, view their interracial relationship with concern. Later that year, Clyde is falsely accused of murdering local publican Eddie Royle (Michael Melia). With the police closing in, Clyde resolves to leave the square with his son Kofi (Marcel Smith) and tells Michelle about this; she later decides to go with him and take Vicki along in the process. Their getaway fails, and Clyde is imprisoned for three months. He is eventually exonerated, but by then Michelle has already moved on to his companion Jack Woodman (James Gilbey), during the events of Clyde's prison stint; Clyde ends his relationship with Michelle after catching her in bed with Woodman.

Following Clyde's departure, Michelle seeks to move on from Woodman as well. Woodman, though, is unwilling to accept this and insists that he and Michelle are meant to be together. When she rejects his advances, he behaves erratically: he convinces Pauline that he is dating Michelle and steals her unwashed knickers, makes threatening phone calls and he injures himself to gain her sympathy. In March, Vicki is abducted from her playgroup and Woodman is the prime suspect; he is soon proven innocent when Michelle learns that Vicki has been with a woman named Audrey Whittingham (Shirley Dixon). Despite being reunited with her daughter, Michelle continues to endure her issues with Woodman as he begins stalking her. She soon confronts both Woodman's father (Peter Kelly) and stepmother (Helen Blizard) about the trouble with his irrational behaviour, but they refuse to do anything about it after making their viewpoints about Woodman clear. It eventually turns out that Woodman has a history of stalking girls, to which Michelle later confronts him; Woodman breaks down and confesses to everything, before his father takes him home with him. Michelle is able to move forward from her troubles with Woodman by planning to graduate from University, and is eventually successful after gaining a Bachelor of Arts degree in December 1994.

Michelle is shot by Dougie Briggs, an army friend of her arch-nemesis and Sharon's husband Grant Mitchell.

During this time, Michelle has become archenemies with Sharon's hardman husband Grant Mitchell (Ross Kemp). The follow-up of their wedding sees Sharon undergoing a domestic ordeal due to Grant's aggressive and volatile nature, up to the point where Michelle becomes his nemesis after opposing Grant's treatment towards Sharon. One such incident results in Michelle getting shot by Grant's old army friend, Dougie Briggs (Max Gold), as a result of the latter's psychotic behaviour from the past. Michelle survives the shooting, but upon recovering continues her feud with Grant to the stage where the truth about Vicki's paternity becomes public knowledge around the square; Vicki would eventually learn the truth herself in April 1994 after Michelle admits to her that Sharon is her sister. Later on in the year, Michelle and Sharon get drunk and they begin talking about Grant—not knowing that they've accidentally left a tape recording in their room. Their conversation soon turns to the fact that Sharon had been cheating on Grant with his brother Phil (Steve McFadden), as she had been having an affair with him before and after Grant had gotten himself in prison over his behaviour. This proves to be consequential when Grant ends up in possession with the tape and plays it in his car, whereupon he learns the truth about Sharon and Phil. Feeling hurt and betrayed, Grant storms into the pub during Phil's engagement party to Kathy and plays the tape in front of everyone—thus exposing Sharon's affair with Phil in the process. In the aftermath, Michelle supports Sharon after Grant declares their marriage to be over—but in doing so gets her relationship with Kathy strained in the process; Kathy initially resents Michelle's plight to amend things between them, but the pair soon make up in the end. Nonetheless, Kathy continues to harbor a grudge against Sharon over what has happened with the Mitchell Brothers.

In 1995, Michelle considers her life in Walford and contemplates on moving to Scotland with her new boyfriend Geoff Barnes (David Roper)—who coincidentally turns out to be her former university lecturer. They even considered getting married as well, but Michelle is left unhappy when Geoff has second thoughts and ends up calling it off. At the same time, Sharon leaves the square following the breakup of her marriage with Grant. The follow-up of Sharon's departure escalates the hostility between Michelle and Grant, as they blame each other over Sharon's exit from the square. Eventually, she confronts Grant in the pub one night over the way he treated Sharon. Tensions rise between them and their confrontation soon begins to turn passionate, and in the end Michelle and Grant end up having a one-night stand. Michelle quickly regrets it when she discovers that she is pregnant and realises that Grant is the father. Not wanting Grant to ever know about this, Michelle decides to leave the square to start anew with Vicki in the United States. While making preparations to leave the country, Michelle tells her brother Mark (Todd Carty) about her one-night stand with Grant and her pregnancy; she later tells Arthur about this too, but decides not to tell Pauline herself. After being offered a job in Alabama, Michelle parts ways with her family, and even makes amends with Grant, before leaving the square with Vicki. Everyone bids Michelle goodbye outside the pub as she and Vicki leave in a taxi.

=== 2016–2018 ===
In 2016, when Michelle learns from Sharon that Grant and Phil's mother Peggy (Barbara Windsor) is dying of cancer, a guilty Michelle sends her a letter telling her she has another grandchild. However, the letter arrives after Peggy dies, and Sharon reads it instead. Sharon visits Michelle to learn the truth, feeling betrayed that not only had Michelle had sex with her former husband, but also lied about Mark's paternity.

When Sharon returns to Walford in August, Phil finds the letter and discovers that Mark Jr (Ned Porteous) is Grant's son. He confronts Sharon over this discovery, but she urges him not to tell Grant about this; Phil ignores this and ends up drunkenly calling Grant over to Walford. When Grant arrives back in the square, he initially gets the impression from Michelle that Phil is making this theory up because of his alcoholism; Grant eventually learns the truth, but Sharon convinces him not to tell Michelle about him knowing the secret.

On Christmas Eve 2016, Michelle (now played by Jenna Russell) eventually reappears in Walford and reunites with Sharon; she is invited by Martin (now played by James Bye) to stay with him and his second wife Stacey Slater (Lacey Turner) at their residence. Sharon suspects something is wrong as Michelle has left Mark and Tim behind in the United States, but Michelle refuses to talk about it. Michelle and Martin reminisce about their family but Stacey is annoyed by Michelle's presence. Michelle announces she is going back to Florida but Stacey overhears her breaking down on the phone to Tim. Michelle confides in Sharon that Mark has left home with his girlfriend and that she and Tim have not had sex for almost two years.

She then tells Sharon that back in Florida she had a sexual relationship with a 17-year-old student, Preston Cooper (Martin Anzor). Sharon allows Michelle to stay with her and Michelle starts drinking alcohol on her own. Sharon and Phil go on holiday, leaving Michelle to look after the home, as well as take care of both Phil's teenaged daughter Louise (Tilly Keeper) and Sharon's pre-teen son Denny Rickman Jr. (Bleu Landau). On Valentine's Day, Preston turns up, leading to him and Michelle kissing passionately. Michelle goes for a job interview at a teaching agency, but fails to get the job as they find out from her references about her relationship with Preston.

Thereafter, Michelle insists that he should go home but he tries to win her back, though she is adamant their relationship is over. Michelle then sees Preston with her niece Bex Fowler (Jasmine Armfield), and in response, Preston attempts to trick Michelle into catching him in bed with Bex; she soon realises that he is using Bex to make her jealous. The plan apparently works, as Michelle and Preston have sex again. Denny then discovers Michelle and Preston's relationship, and starts blackmailing Michelle into buying him trainers and allowing him time off school.

Michelle is later furious when she finds out Denny bought a video game using her credit card, which leads to the pair having an argument that involves Denny accusing her of being a paedophile, and she slaps him, after which Louise comes home to witness Michelle calling Denny a "brat". Upon failing to obtain £100 from Michelle as she insists in her expected repayment, Denny tells Louise about Michelle and Preston's relationship, while Bex and Preston decide to make their relationship official.

Louise tells Bex that Michelle and Preston are having sex, but Bex refuses to believe it; however, when she sees Preston put his hand on Michelle's shoulder and Michelle flinch, Bex publicly asks if it is true that Michelle is having sex with her boyfriend. Louise reveals the truth, and Martin attacks Preston before berating Michelle over how the situation has turned out.

A drunk Michelle frantically tries to find Preston, getting into Phil's car, having taken sleeping pills. Speeding around the square, Michelle is shocked to see Preston, who jumps out of the way of the car. She swerves in the end, consequently crashing into the chip shop, where Kathy and fellow neighbour Kush Kazemi (Davood Ghadami) are nearly injured as a result. Michelle is rushed to hospital, where she needs an operation after rupturing her spleen. She is later discharged, but is angered upon learning that Sharon has convinced Preston to return to the States.

Michelle decides to return to the States, but Sharon convinces her to attend the police station to be interviewed over the crash. The police say that the CPS will assess whether she should be charged with an offence, confiscating her passport so she cannot leave the country.

Sharon encourages Michelle to make amends with Martin and Ian, but neither of them is interested; Michelle talks to Bex, who says Michelle let herself down, and the old Michelle that Bex used to look up to would hate this Michelle, and that she ruined everything she worked for. Michelle cries in Sharon's arms, saying she no longer knows herself. Ian eventually forgives Michelle, but Martin still refuses to speak to her. Michelle attempts to find work in schools, without any luck.

Stacey invites Michelle to a family meal, but Martin says Michelle is only pretending to care about her family, and tells her that she is not the big sister he used to look up to. Michelle starts community service, and hears that Tim wants a divorce; she tries to avoid the issue. Eventually, Martin and Michelle start to talk again, but he is still angry that she has behaved like a teenager.

Michelle then realises that she needs to apply for other jobs, so enquires about a sales assistant job, which she successfully obtains. Whilst travelling to work on the Tube, Michelle meets a passenger named Tom Bailey (Daniel Casey) on the train, and she eventually gets the courage to ask him to go out on a date. Although they get along well, Michelle later loses interest in Tom, and decides to reject him. He does not react well, and begins to stalk her by sending her flowers and chocolates.

Michelle tries to move on and goes on a date with a man but does not hear from him again, unaware that Tom has threatened him. Michelle later invites Tom round for dinner in an attempt to get rid of him for good. When he starts to try kissing Michelle, this prompts Sharon, along with fellow residents Denise Fox (Diane Parish) and Karen Taylor (Lorraine Stanley) to retaliate by hitting him over the head with a vase; Tom is then confronted over lying to Michelle about his wife being dead, to which he responds by leaving the Square in disgust. Michelle later decides to spend Christmas with her daughter Vicki in Australia.

In 2018, Michelle is requested by Sharon's business partner Mel Owen (Tamzin Outhwaite) to tutor her son Hunter (Charlie Winter) in the hope that he would improve his school grades. However, upon arrival for their first session, Michelle catches Louise and Hunter having sex. As Phil disapproves of the relationship, Louise begs her to keep quiet, so Michelle tells Mel she cannot tutor Hunter. Hunter claims that Michelle tried to kiss him, so Mel attacks Michelle. Due to Michelle's history with Preston, Sharon believes Hunter's claim, only for him to then reveal the truth in the end. After speaking to Martin about this, Michelle realises that she would likely exhibit her mother's persona should she stay in Walford. Deciding that it is not worth staying in the Square any longer, Michelle leaves the country to visit Mark and Vicki abroad. She would later continue to travel on her own, and is last heard of staying in Australia.

== Reception ==
In 1998, writers from Inside Soap published an article about the top ten characters they wanted to return to soap. Michelle was featured and they described her as "a sensible single mum who had suffered more traumas by the time she was 25 than most people do in a lifetime. Her problems were made uncomfortable yet compulsive viewing."

In 2020, Sara Wallis and Ian Hyland from The Daily Mirror placed Michelle 23rd on their ranked list of the best EastEnders characters of all time and wrote that her most memorable moments included "a secret baby with Den Watts at 16, witnessing Den's "assassination", inadvertently exposing Sharon's affair with Phil, and having a secret baby with Grant", as well as adding that she "cruelly betrayed" Lofty.
