= Shirley Carter =

Fictional character from EastEnders

- EastEnders character
- Portrayed by: Linda Henry
- Duration: 2006–2022
- First appearance: Episode 3270; 7 December 2006
- Last appearance: Episode 6619; 29 December 2022
- Created by: Dominic Treadwell-Collins; Alexander Lamb
- Introduced by: Kate Harwood
- Spin-off appearances: EastEnders: E20 (2010)
In-universe information
- Other names: Sue
- Occupation: Barmaid; Nightclub manager; Café owner; Shop assistant; Receptionist; Pub landlady
- Father: Stan Carter
- Mother: Sylvie Carter
- Sisters: Tina Carter
- Husband: Kevin Wicks (backstory)
- Sons: Mick Carter; Jimbo Wicks; Dean Wicks
- Daughters: Carly Wicks
- Grandsons: Lee Carter; Johnny Carter; Jimmy Wicks; Ollie Carter
- Granddaughters: Frankie Lewis; Nancy Carter; Jade Masood
- Aunts: Babe Smith
- Nieces: Zsa Zsa Carter

Shirley Carter is a fictional character from the BBC soap opera EastEnders, played by Linda Henry. She first appeared on 7 December 2006, during episodes set in Dorset. This is Henry's second role in EastEnders, as she previously played Lorraine Salter from 1991 to 1992. Shirley was presented upon her arrival as the mother of established characters Deano (Matt Di Angelo) and Carly Wicks (Kellie Shirley). Henry took a break from the show on 7 September 2012, before returning on 3 December 2012. On 29 December 2022, Henry made an unannounced exit from the show. Although it was initially teased that the character would be returning to the show, in 2025, it was confirmed that there were no plans for Henry to return. Shirley is also one of several EastEnders characters to appear in the internet spin-off series EastEnders: E20.

Shirley's early stories included her attempts to rebuild relationships with her children Carly (Kellie Shirley) and Deano, later Dean (Matt Di Angelo), her friendship with Heather Trott (Cheryl Fergison) and a volatile relationship with Phil Mitchell (Steve McFadden), which ends when Phil covers up his son Ben's (Joshua Pascoe) murder of Heather. In 2013, Shirley's extended family were introduced, led by her brother Mick (Danny Dyer), who was later revealed to be her son. Shirley's loyalties are conflicted when Dean raped Mick's wife, Linda (Kellie Bright), and she also faced a custody battle with Shabnam Masood (Rakhee Thakrar) over her and Dean's daughter, Jade Green (Amaya Edward).

== Development ==
Shirley's creation was announced in September 2006, at which time she was described as being "brassy, rough, tarty and tough-as-old-boots" by media entertainment website Digital Spy. Henry, who had appeared in the serial during the early 1990s as prostitute Lorraine Salter, said: "I'm thrilled to be joining EastEnders. I'm both nervous and excited as I've watched it for many years". Created as an extension of the established Wicks family, Shirley's arrival was welcomed by her son, Deano. Di Angelo deemed his character "very fond" of his mother, keen to forge a relationship with her, and attributed Deano's childish characterisation to her absence during his formative years. Other relatives were less enthused by her arrival: Shirley developed a rivalry with Wicks matriarch Pat (Pam St Clement), which culminated in a physical fight and their arrest in April 2007. Digital Spy's Dek Hogan highlighted a similarity between the two, and commented prior to their fight that Shirley was "so like Pat was when she first arrived it's frightening."

A friendship developed between Shirley and local businessman and criminal Phil Mitchell (Steve McFadden) in 2008, as she underwent a breast-cancer scare. Reluctant to seek medical help, Shirley admitted to Phil that she was afraid, and he responded with "genuine kindness". Their friendship developed into romance, and Shirley was later able to save him from an addiction to crack cocaine, which Henry felt reflected the strength of their relationship. Although Shirley was wounded to discover he had been unfaithful to her, Henry explained that, regardless of the tough façade her character projected, she still loved him. She characterised Shirley as "a strong, proud woman [who] wouldn't stay with someone for [the wrong] reasons", and suggested they could survive the affair: "It will need effort to make it work and they'll never have the perfect relationship, but neither Phil nor Shirley would want a completely quiet life."

On 29 December 2022, Henry made an unannounced exit from the show; this coincided with the departure of her onscreen son Mick Carter (Danny Dyer). Series producer Chris Clenshaw confirmed that Shirley's exit was part of Henry's decision to take an extended break from the show, but she would return in the future. In July 2025, reports emerged that Henry had no plans to return to the series.

== Storylines ==
Shirley first appears, when, against her former husband Kevin Wicks' (Phil Daniels) wishes, she introduces herself to her adult children, Carly (Kellie Shirley) and Deano (Matt Di Angelo), whom she had walked out on as children in 1989. Carly is hostile but Deano is amenable, so Shirley moves to Walford to be near them. Kevin and Shirley maintain an antagonistic relationship. Shirley attempts to sabotage his relationship with Denise Fox (Diane Parish) and threatens to tell her children about their true paternity, which she eventually does: she tells Carly her father is a man named Daniel and Deano that she does not know who his father is. Kevin had brought up Carly and Deano as his own, as well as his natural child with Shirley, Jimbo (Lloyd Richards), who had cystic fibrosis, which Shirley struggled with and ended up walking out on the family, not attending Jimbo's funeral when he died aged 21. The revelation only drives Carly and Deano further away. When she learns that Kevin has been selling cut-and-shut cars, she confronts him. They try to dispose of a stolen car together but are involved in a crash, which kills Kevin. In the aftermath, Carly rejects her mother and leaves Walford. Deano, who gets in trouble with the police, is imprisoned and when released he blames Shirley for all his problems and also moves away.

Shirley begins a relationship with Vinnie Monks (Bobby Davro), at the urging of her best friend Heather Trott (Cheryl Fergison), but the romance eventually ends when Vinnie learns Shirley is harbouring feelings for Phil Mitchell (Steve McFadden). Phil, an alcoholic, gets drunk with Shirley, uses her for sex and as a surrogate mother for his son, Ben (CharlieJones/Joshua Pascoe). Shirley falls in love with Phil. She gives him an alibi when he is suspected of murder and helps him get custody of his daughter, Louise (Brittany Papple), leading to them beginning a legitimate relationship. Shirley is so in love with Phil that she is willing to overlook his misdemeanours. She stands by him when Louise returns to her mother Lisa (Lucy Benjamin) and when Ben is sent to juvenile detention for assault, leading to Phil developing an addiction to crack cocaine. She even forgives him for several affairs, firstly with fellow addict Rainie Cross (Tanya Franks) and secondly with his own aunt by marriage, Glenda Mitchell (Glynis Barber). In remorse for his wrongdoings, Phil tries to convince Shirley to marry him and she almost does but decides that marriage is unnecessary. She remains with Phil under the proviso that he never cheats on her again.

Shirley's life is thrown into turmoil when her best friend, Heather, is found dead at her flat. Unknown to Shirley, the murderer is Phil's son Ben. Phil tries to cover up Ben's involvement but Shirley grows obsessed with tracing the killer. She finds the murder weapon, a metal photo frame, in a neighbour's house and traces it to a charity shop where it was donated by Phil. She realises that Phil was involved in Heather's death and discusses her suspicions with Ben, who buckles under pressure and reveals information about Heather's death that only the murderer could know. Shirley realises that Ben killed Heather and tries to drown him in the bath, but Phil stops her. Phil convinces her not to call the police but Ben goes to the police and confesses. Unable to cope with Phil's betrayal, Shirley ends the relationship and starts drinking heavily. Phil sees that she needs help and calls Carly, who takes Shirley to stay with her and her infant son Jimmy. When Shirley returns, she remains hostile to Phil and takes his hush money, despite still having feelings for him.

Shirley and her sister, Tina Carter (Luisa Bradshaw-White), move into The Queen Victoria public house, when their supposed brother, Mick Carter (Danny Dyer), buys it and moves his family to Walford. After 25 years of animosity, Shirley is reunited with her father, Stan Carter (Timothy West). Despite their mutual hostility, Stan gives Shirley £10,000, which she invests in the pub for a 20% share. It transpires that Stan is in contact with Deano, now going by his birth name of Dean. Stan encourages a reunion with mother and son, but Dean remains hostile to Shirley. Eventually, Shirley manages to build bridges with her father and Dean. Shirley grows jealous of Phil's relationship with Sharon Rickman (Letitia Dean). Sharon agrees to marry Phil but discovers that Phil was responsible for a break-in at her bar. Furious, Sharon decides to fleece Phil for his money in revenge. Phil discovers this, confides in Shirley and starts an affair with her, planning to jilt Sharon at the altar and resume a relationship with Shirley. However, Sharon and Phil discover their respective deceptions and ultimately decide to marry. Dejected, Shirley admits her affair with Phil after the wedding and when Phil rejects her, she shoots him. Fearing Shirley's incarceration, Shirley's aunt Babe Smith (Annette Badland) organises her escape. Dean is distraught and when Mick's partner, Linda Carter (Kellie Bright), comforts him, he rapes her. Mick and Dean eventually bring Shirley back to Walford when Stan admits he has terminal prostate cancer.

They meet Shirley's childhood sweetheart, Buster Briggs (Karl Howman), and Dean realises that he is Buster's son. They plan to run away together but Mick has Buster arrested for breaking his bail conditions as he is on day release. It is later revealed that Buster is also Mick's father and Shirley is actually Mick's mother, not his sister, Shirley having given birth to him at age fourteen. Shirley and Mick find Shirley's mother, Sylvie Carter (Linda Marlowe), hiding at Babe's house. Sylvie has Alzheimer's disease and tells Mick she is not his mother but he dismisses this as her being confused. Shirley tries to stop Mick interacting with Sylvie, fearing her secret will be revealed. However, Sylvie is invited to Christmas dinner. Secrets are divulged at the dinner: Linda reveals Dean raped her so Mick tells Shirley before attacking Dean and is only stopped by Shirley confessing that she is his mother, not sister, and that Dean is his brother. The family is split following this revelation as Shirley sides with Dean, believing his version of events. Shirley reveals the reason why she kept her identity as Mick's mother a secret: her pregnancy with Mick was scorned by Sylvie, who attempted to force a miscarriage by pushing her down a flight of stairs. Shirley was forced to raise Mick as her brother and Stan's son, out of fear she would never see him again. Hostilities continue and Shirley struggles to bond with Mick, due to her and Buster's continued alliance to Dean. This results in Shirley being banished from Stan's funeral, despite Shirley having nursed her father through his dying moments.

Shirley learns from Dean he has a seven-year-old daughter and confronts the child's mother, Shabnam Masood (Rakhee Thakrar), who continues to lie. Shirley is upset when Linda forbids her from seeing Ollie. Masood Ahmed (Nitin Ganatra) gives Shirley the address of Dean's daughter, verifying the child, Jade Green (Amaya Edward), previously Roya, is alive. Shirley finds Jade but discovers she has cystic fibrosis. After Dean decides that Jade is better off without him, Shirley warns that she will fight for custody, eventually gaining Shabnam and Dean's support. When Shirley finds a bra behind her settee, she assumes Buster had sex with Carol Jackson (Lindsey Coulson), which Carol does not deny. Shirley nearly throws Buster out and starts considering adopting Jade alone but Carol admits that nothing happened and Shirley helps her come to terms with her mastectomy. Shirley and Buster are awarded custody of Jade after a grieving Shabnam does not contest it. Shirley prevents Dean from raping Roxy Mitchell (Rita Simons) and, finally believing that he is a rapist, tries to drown him in the bath but he recovers and strikes her as Linda enters. Dean then admits that he raped Linda and goes into hiding. Dean confronts Shirley at Mick and Linda's wedding and attempts to drown her. Mick saves her and Dean, who is then arrested over Roxy. Shirley then encourages Mick and Linda to get married and helps Nancy and Lee run the pub while Mick and Linda are on their honeymoon and has Jade help out to give her some work experience. She is furious when Shabnam turns up overprotective of Jade outside of her visiting hours, but after Masood tells her that Shabnam is unlikely to have any more children, she grows sympathetic and allows Jade to spend more time with Shabnam.

She finds Phil binge drinking, where he admits that he drunk-drove and crashed a car with him, Ian Beale (Adam Woodyatt) and Sharon's son Dennis Rickman (Bleu Landau), and Ian took the blame for driving. Shirley encourages Phil to tell Sharon what really happened, and when he eventually does later that night, Sharon ends their marriage. The following day, Shirley learns from Louise (now played by Tilly Keeper) that Phil has been rushed to hospital and his liver is damaged. Shirley, Sharon and Kathy Sullivan (Gillian Taylforth) go to the hospital only to find that Phil has discharged himself. They find Phil drunk at the pub, where he insults his family and hits Kathy. Shirley throws Phil out and admits to Buster that she still has feelings for Phil and is upset as he is risking his health. Buster comforts her and tells her she should move on from Phil because he only cares about himself. A month later, Shirley receives another visiting order from Dean, and eventually decides to visit Dean in prison, to encourage him to plead guilty for trying to rape Roxy. Dean, however, is in denial so Shirley threatens to disown him permanently if he pleads not guilty. The next day, Shabnam tells Shirley, Buster and Jade that she is moving to Ealing so Jade can visit her anytime. In court, Shirley watches as Dean pleads not guilty, much to her disgust. However, due to his failure to surrender to custody on numerous previous occasions, Dean is remanded in custody and a trial in June. Realising that Jade needs protecting from Dean and should be with her mother, Shirley and Buster tell Shabnam that they would like Jade to live with her full-time, giving her full custody, which she accepts. Shirley, unaware that Buster is having an affair with Kathy, is furious when he pays off their acquitted son, Dean, with all their savings, but is later devastated when Buster leaves Walford without saying goodbye to her, whilst she is in the midst of helping Phil end his alcoholism. Mick suggests to Shirley that Buster had an affair with Denise, who is now heavily pregnant. However, when Shirley confronts Denise, Denise confesses she is expecting Phil's son, which is overheard by Sharon.

Babe breaches the pub licence when she inadvertently sells alcohol to an undercover police officer, and the police arrive and arrest Mick, Babe and Shirley. They are formally charged with breaching their pub licence, remaining in custody until their appearance in court the following morning. Shirley later catches Babe stealing money from the safe, and discover that she stolen the entire money that her father left her, Mick and Tina in his will causing Mick to evict her. Shirley and Mick then disgusted to learn that Mick and Linda's son, Lee Carter (Danny Hatchard), has hit his wife, Whitney Carter (Shona McGarty), during a heated argument. Mick confides in Shirley; she strongly advises Mick to tell Lee that he must leave Whitney, which he does. Shirley and Tina later have arguments as to whether they should put Sylvie in a home as Shirley does not want to look after her as she can see the trouble Mick is in. Realising Mick will never be able to pay the £20,000 fine ordered by the court, Shirley decides to put the blame on herself and she tells the police she knew Babe was breaching their licence but did nothing about it. She is subsequently charged with perverting the cause of justice. Although the Carters initially think that Shirley will only be in prison for six weeks, they are heartbroken to learn that her sentence has been doubled, meaning that she will stay in prison for three months. Tina visits Shirley in prison to inform her of Sylvie's death, which does not seem to upset Shirley but later when her cellmate Debbie Morton (Beth Cordingly) teases Shirley about her feelings, Shirley beats her up in their cell.

Shirley is tricked into selling the freehold of The Queen Vic by Max Branning (Jake Wood) and she forges Mick's signature. Mick is angry when he finds out and The Queen Vic is being controlled by Fi Browning (Lisa Faulkner). The Carters are unaware that it is part of a plan by a company, Weyland & Co, to demolish The Queen Vic and redevelop the whole area. The Carters are tricked into debt and are served with an eviction notice; however, they are able to save The Queen Vic when Mick gets involved in a heist and Lee's friend Callum Highway (Tony Clay) donates an expensive ring that he stole from the heist. The pub is bought solely by Mick and Linda with Shirley no longer owning it.

In early 2020, Dennis goes to live with Shirley following Sharon's affair with Keanu Taylor (Danny Walters). With Phil away and Dennis angry at Sharon, Shirley comforts and supports Dennis and is upset when he dies later in the year. She later befriends Gray Atkins (Toby-Alexander Smith) when she talks him out of killing himself and his children following the death of his wife Chantelle Atkins (Jessica Plummer). Shirley moves in with Gray to support him and Tina joins them, to Gray's chagrin. Tina eventually works out that Gray killed Chantelle and so, Gray murders her on Boxing Day 2020. The Carters believe that Tina has fled Walford following an attack on Ian Beale (Adam Woodyatt) but the real culprits are Phil and Sharon. When Tina's corpse is unearthed a year and a half later, Shirley blames them both for Tina's death and is heartbroken by her murder, believing that if Tina hadn't been framed, then the series of events leading to her murder would not have happened. Shirley and Gray confront each other after Shirley discovers that he murdered Tina and Chantelle. Shirley herself is nearly killed by Gray, when he hits her over the head with the leg of a bar stool. This results in her falling unconscious and her head bleeding; however, she recovers and Gray is arrested.

When Mick starts a relationship with local schemer Janine Butcher (Charlie Brooks), Shirley suspects her motives and tries to reunite Mick and Linda, despite her animosity with the latter. Shirley is convinced that Janine is hiding something and is proven right when she realises that Janine framed Linda for a car crash that Janine caused. She causes a disturbance at Mick and Janine's wedding and is distraught days later when Mick disappears and is presumed dead, this results in Shirley leaving Walford with Lady Di to stay with Carly and her grandson. Some months later, Carly sends a photo of Shirley to Linda with Dean in the background, revealing that Shirley has reconnected with Dean. When Dean returns to Walford later in the year, he claims that the deaths of Tina and Mick caused Shirley to be admitted into a psychiatric ward and that Shirley was so unwell that she wasn't even speaking. Dean also claims that the lack of contact from Carly and Linda contributed to this.

== Reception ==
=== Accolades ===
Henry has been nominated for several television awards for her portrayal of Shirley. Henry and Fergison were nominated in the Best On-Screen Partnership category at the 2008 British Soap Awards, and Digital Spy Soap Awards, and for Best Double Act at the 2009 TV Times Awards. Henry was shortlisted in the Best Soap Actress category at the 2009 TV Quick and TV Choice awards. At the 2009 Inside Soap Awards, Shirley was nominated in the Best Bitch category. Henry was also shortlisted in the Best Actress category at the 2012 Inside Soap Awards.

At the 2014 British Soap Awards, she was nominated for the British Soap Award for Best Comedy Performance. A year later, she was nominated within the Serial Drama Performance category at the 20th National Television Awards. Then in 2022, she was shortlisted for the Best Leading Performer accolade at the 2022 British Soap Awards.

=== Critical response ===
Early in Shirley's tenure, Hogan advised viewers to "rejoice in [her] wonderful nastiness". He found her an "unpleasant" addition to the series, and though he commended Henry's portrayal, he hoped to see more possibility of redemption for Shirley, as "It's difficult to buy into a character that comes across as unremittingly unpleasant." Hogan called her "the most convincing drunk" in the programme for twenty years, but noted, "that really doesn't make her any less annoying and her scenes are a pain in the neck to sit through." Kate White of Inside Soap praised the friendship between Shirley and Jean Slater (Gillian Wright), "We love, love, love the genius pairing of Jean and Shirley. With Heather [Trott, played by Cheryl Fergison] having been brown bread [dead] for over a year, it's time Shirley got a new BFF – and we reckon zany Jean is perfect."

In the British media, she has been referred to as "Shirley Terrahawk" due to her resemblance to a character from Terrahawks. Jim Shelly once branded her the "human Terrahawk" in the Daily Mirror and "an alcoholic Terrahawk" in The Guardian. John McKie from the Daily Record said that Phil getting together with "Shirley the Terrahawk" was grotesque. Kevin O'Sullivan from the Sunday Mirror said that "Shirley Terrahawk went into theatrical meltdown" after Heather died, adding that it was "hilarious overacting" on Henry's part.

In 2020, Sara Wallis and Ian Hyland from The Daily Mirror placed Shirley 53rd on their ranked list of the best EastEnders characters of all time, calling her "uncompromising" and the fierce matriarch of the Carter family who "showed her softer side" through her friendships with Jean and Heather.
