= Cheryl Fergison =

English actress (born 1965)

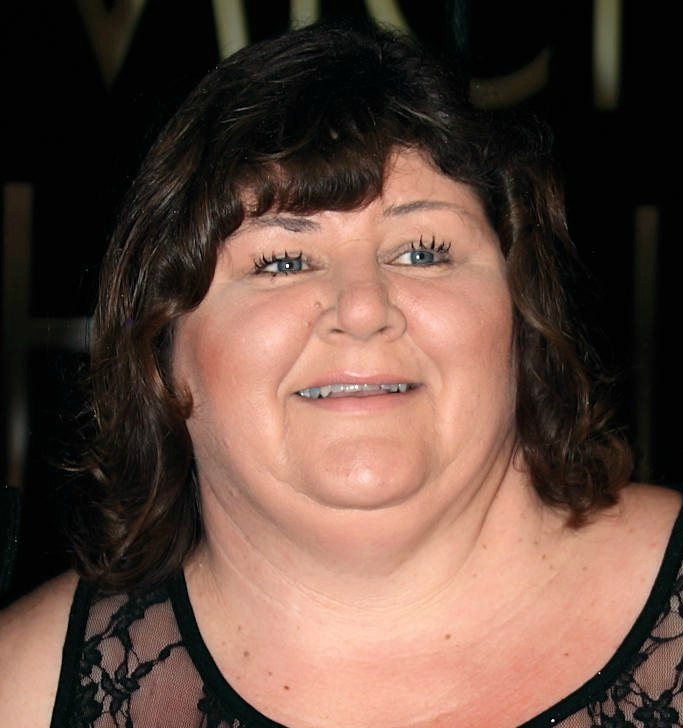
- Fergison in 2011
- Born: 27 August 1965 (age 61); London, England
- Education: Rose Bruford College
- Occupation: Actress
- Years active: 1992–present
- Television: EastEnders; Celebrity Big Brother; The Spa; Big School
- Spouses: Jamshed Saddiqi (divorced); Yassine El Jamouni (m. 2011)
- Children: 1

Cheryl El Jamouni (born 27 August 1965), known professionally as Cheryl Fergison, is an English actress. She is known for playing Heather Trott in the BBC soap opera EastEnders, a part she played from 2007 until 2012.

== Career ==
After training at Rose Bruford College, Fergison started playing the role of Heather Trott on the BBC soap opera EastEnders on 26 June 2007. The character was conceived by the former executive producer, Diederick Santer. Prior to this, Fergison made a brief appearance on the series as a friend of Mo Harris (Laila Morse) in 2005.

Fergison's stage credits include Measure for Measure, for the Royal Shakespeare Company and the 2006 season at The Scoop.

Fergison is also known for playing Joanna Harding in the Linda Flint sketches of Little Britain, opposite David Walliams, and also played Judy in The IT Crowd. Other notable appearances include 'Allo 'Allo!, Little Miss Jocelyn, Bad Girls and Casualty, as well as playing Mrs. Lloyd in two episodes of Doctor Who, "The Empty Child" and "The Doctor Dances". Fergison also starred in a promotional video for the band Keane's single "Atlantic", which was included on their Under the Iron Sea DVD.

In November 2007, Fergison participated in the Children in Need charity appeal with her EastEnders co-stars which was broadcast on BBC One. On 26 June 2008, she appeared on and won an EastEnders special of quiz show The Weakest Link.

Since appearing on EastEnders, Fergison has made a variety of television appearances on shows such as GMTV, The Paul O'Grady Show, This Morning and Loose Women. She won the Best Comedy Performance award at the 2008 Inside Soap Awards, and was then nominated for Best Comedy Performance and Best Onscreen Partnership Award (alongside Linda Henry) at the 2008 British Soap Awards. Fergison later appeared in Let's Dance For Sport Relief, dancing to "Ice Ice Baby" by Vanilla Ice, and appeared in an episode of BBC Two's Shooting Stars in August 2010.

On 17 September 2011, Fergison was axed from EastEnders and it was announced that she would leave at the end of her current contract, departing the show on 21 March 2012. Heather was killed-off after being murdered by Ben Mitchell (Joshua Pascoe).

In March 2012, Fergison appeared on The Saturday Night Show. In April and June 2012, Fergison made two guest panellist appearances on ITV's Loose Women. On 15 August 2012, Fergison entered the Celebrity Big Brother 10 house. On 24 August 2012, she became the second housemate to be evicted.

Fergison was one of the celebrity contestants on Your Face Sounds Familiar. During the series, she sang as Dusty Springfield, Anastacia, Meatloaf, Lulu, Madonna, Cher and Adele. She played the role of Jo in the 2014 series of Big School on BBC One. On 24 December 2016, Fergison reprised her role on EastEnders as Heather, in the form of a recorded voiceover. The recording was a taped message left by Heather for Dot Branning (June Brown), who discovered it on her last day working in the launderette.

From October to November 2018, she played the part of Mrs Bird in the musical production of Maggie May at the Royal Court Theatre in Liverpool.

In 2022, she played a fictionalised version of herself in Catherine Tate's six-part mockumentary sitcom Hard Cell, released on Netflix.

Fergison is also a keen singer and has posted numerous singing videos to her YouTube account. In 2022, she sang at various pubs and venues and was also seen busking outside a local takeaway. She regularly performs at events, including Mullingar Pride in July 2022.

== Personal life ==
Fergison divorced her husband, Jamshed Saddiqi, in 2008. She and Saddiqi have one child, a son named Alex. In May 2011, Fergison married Yassine Al-Jermoni.

In 2015, Fergison was diagnosed with stage II womb cancer. After attending a regular smear test, which came back clear, Fergison began experiencing back pain and spotting blood, which she recognised as abnormal. She did not make her diagnosis public until April 2024.

In 2024, Fergison revealed that after leaving EastEnders, she struggled with money problems and ended up using food banks.

== Filmography ==
=== As an actress ===
Year	Title	Role	Notes
1992	Covington Cross	Maid 2	2 episodes: "Outlaws" and "The Persecution"
1992	'Allo 'Allo!	Desiree	Episode: "Missing and Presumed Dead"
1993	Genghis Cohn	Frau Langer	Supporting role
1994	Middlemarch	Pritchard	5 episodes
1996	Interview Day	Miss Bodley	Television film
1997	A Royal Scandal	Cleaning Maid	Television film
1997	Cold Enough for Snow	Mrs. Bodley	Television film
2004–2005	Little Britain	Joanna Harding	2 episodes
2005	Doctor Who	Mrs. Lloyd	2 episodes: "The Empty Child" and "The Doctor Dances"
2005	EastEnders	Meg	1 episode
2006	The IT Crowd	Judy	Episode: "The Haunting of Bill Crouse"
2006	Little Miss Jocelyn	Various	1 episode
2006	Bad Girls	Latoya	Series 8, episode 7
2006	Casualty	Lucille Prior	Episode: "Get What You Deserve"
2007	The Life and Times of Vivienne Vyle	Fan With a Baby	1 episode
2007–2012, 2016	EastEnders	Heather Trott	386 episodes
2008	Children in Need	Housemaid	Television special
2009	Mr. Right	Red Team Woman	Supporting role
2010	EastEnders: E20	Heather Trott	4 episodes
2013	The Spa	Ms. Wylde	Main role
2014	Big School	Jo	6 episodes
2016	White Island	Security Guard	Supporting role
2021	Hansel and Gretel: After Ever After	Executioner	Television film
2021–2022	The Stand Up Sketch Show	Various	3 episodes
2022	Dodger	Mrs. McCurdy	Episode: "Imposter"
2022	Hard Cell	Herself	Main role
2024	Mr. Bigstuff	Julie	1 episode
2025	Mandy	Stella	Series 4, episode 1
2027	Time Agent	Fiona	Web series; series 5

=== As herself ===
Year	Title	Role	Notes
2008	The Weakest Link	Contestant	1 episode
2008–2009	The New Paul O'Grady Show	Guest	3 episodes
2008–2020	Loose Women	Guest Panelist	8 episodes
2010–2013	This Morning	Guest	4 episodes
2010	Let's Dance for Sport Relief	Participant	Television special
2010	Shooting Stars	Participant	1 episode
2010	Strictly Come Dancing: It Takes Two	Guest	1 episode
2010	All Star Family Fortunes	Contestant	1 episode
2011	Barbara Windsor: A Comedy Roast	Contributor	Television special
2011	Children in Need	Participant	Television special
2012	EastEnders Revealed	Interviewee	1 episode
2012	Daybreak	Guest	1 episode
2012	Come Dine with Me	Contestant	1 episode
2012	Let's Do Lunch with Gino and Mel	Guest	1 episode
2012	Who Wants to Be a Millionaire	Contestant	1 episode
2012	The Alan Titchmarsh Show	Guest	1 episode
2012	TV Burp	Guest	1 episode
2013	John Bishop's Only Joking	Regular Panelist	6 episodes
2013	Celebrity Juice	Panelist	1 episode
2013	Your Face Sounds Familiar	Regular Performer	6 episodes
2013	Celebrity Big Brother	Celebrity Housemate	14 episodes
2013	Big Brother's Bit on the Side	Guest	14 episodes
2013	Let's Do Christmas with Gino and Mel	Guest	1 episode
2014	Famous, Rich & Hungry	Participant	2 episodes
2015	Pointless Celebrities	Contestant	1 episode
2015	Celebrity Mastermind	Contestant	1 episode
2017	Sky Comedy Christmas Shorts	Contributor	1 episode
2018	Good Morning Britain	Guest	1 episode
2019	Harry Hill's Alien Fun Capsule	Panelist	1 episode

== Theatre credits ==
Year	Title	Role	Notes
1995	Dance of Death	Jenny	Almeida Theatre, Islington
2006	Measure for Measure	Mariana	Royal Shakespeare Company
2012–2013	Cinderella	Fairy Godmother	Central Theatre, Chatham
2013–2014	Jack and the Beanstalk	Spirit of the Beans	Assembly Rooms, Derby
2015–2016	Cinderella	Fairy Godmother	Middlesbrough Theatre
2016	Carnival Dreams the Musical	Teresa	Ashcroft Theatre
2016	Menopause the Musical	Earth Mother	UK Tour
2016–2017	Beauty and The Beast	Wicked Queen	Lighthouse Theatre, Kettering
2017	The Wizard of Oz	Wicked Witch of the West	UK Tour
2017–2018	Sleeping Beauty	Carabosse	The Sands Centre, Carlisle
2018	Ladies Day	Jan	Wolverhampton Grand Theatre
2018	Maggie May	Mrs. Bird	Royal Court Theatre, Liverpool
2018–2019	Jack and the Beanstalk	Fairy	Epsom Playhouse
2019–2020	Jack and the Beanstalk	Fairy	Stockport Plaza
2020–2021	Menopause the Musical	Earth Mother	UK Tour
2021–2022	Aladdin	Spirit of the Ring	Trinity Arts Centre
2022–2023	Cinderella	Fairy Godmother	Stockport Plaza
2026	Livings the Life of Riley	Pauline	UK Tour

== Awards and nominations ==
Year	Award	Category	Result	Ref.
2008	Digital Spy Soap Awards	Best On-Screen Partnership (shared with Linda Henry)	Nominated	
2008	Digital Spy Soap Awards	Best Newcomer	Nominated	
2008	British Soap Awards	Best Comedy Performance	Nominated	
2008	British Soap Awards	Best On-Screen Partnership (shared with Henry)	Nominated	
2008	Inside Soap Awards	Funniest Performance	Won	
2009	Inside Soap Awards	Funniest Performance	Nominated	
