= Sean O'Connor (producer) =

British producer and director (born 1968)

- Born: Sean Michael O'Connor; 11 February 1968 (age 58); The Wirral, England
- Occupations: Television producer; writer; director
- Known for: The Archers; EastEnders

Sean Michael O'Connor (born 11 February 1968) is an English producer, writer, and director working in theatre, film, television and radio. He was the editor of the long-running BBC radio drama, The Archers from 2013 to 2016 and executive producer of EastEnders from 2016 to 2017.

== Early life and education ==
Sean Michael O'Connor was born on 11 February 1968 and grew up in The Wirral, where he attended a grammar school, St Anselm's College, run by the Christian Brothers. He later earned a degree in English from University College London. Following his graduation, O'Connor successfully applied for a place on ITV's Regional Theatre Young Directors’ Scheme.

== Film ==
O'Connor produced the feature film version of Terence Rattigan's The Deep Blue Sea directed by Terence Davies and starring Rachel Weisz, Tom Hiddleston and Simon Russell Beale. The film is based on Rattigan's 1952 play which had previously been filmed in 1955, starring Vivien Leigh and Kenneth More. Produced by Camberwell Productions and Fly Films, The Deep Blue Sea was released in the UK in 2011, the centenary of Rattigan's birth. O'Connor introduces the playtext of The Deep Blue Sea published by Nick Hern Books with notes by Dan Rebellato. O'Connor serves as a trustee of the estate of Sir Terence Rattigan.

== Television and radio ==
In the late 1990s, O'Connor worked as producer of the long-running radio drama The Archers, storylining and directing the programme. He re-introduced several popular characters including Kenton Archer, Adam Travers-Macy and Lillian Bellamy, as well as introducing Fallon Rogers, Ed Grundy and Emma Carter. Subsequently, he was appointed as Series Producer of Hollyoaks on Channel 4.

In 2005, O'Connor was appointed producer of the Channel 5 soap opera Family Affairs. He planned to revamp the show but was told that the show would be axed. He appointed Dominic Treadwell-Collins, his future predecessor in EastEnders as story producer and reintroduced characters Eileen Callan (Rosie Rowell) and Melanie Costello (Rebecca Hunter).

O'Connor also produced the third series of Footballers' Wives for Shed Productions as well as the re-booted version of Minder starring Shane Richie and Lex Shrapnel for TalkbackThames.

On 5 August 2013, it was announced that O'Connor had been appointed editor of The Archers. Of his return to the show, O'Connor commented "I'm delighted to be returning to Ambridge to work with the team in Birmingham. I'm honoured to take the reins of our national epic drama and to build on the extraordinary achievements of Vanessa Whitburn who dedicated much of her career to this unique cultural institution."

=== EastEnders ===
In 2001, O'Connor was appointed as Series Story Producer on the BBC soap opera, EastEnders. story-lining the award-winning Kat and Zoe Slater story, the domestic violence story featuring Little Mo, and Dot Cotton's marriage to Jim Branning. He left the show in 2005.

On 18 February 2016, it was announced that O'Connor would return to EastEnders after 11 years and take over from Dominic Treadwell-Collins as Executive Producer. On his return he commented "I'm thrilled to be back in Walford and particularly delighted to work once more with many dear friends and colleagues both backstage and on screen. I loved my time working at EastEnders previously; there's nothing quite as challenging nor as rewarding."

Following this, he announced he would be stepping down from The Archers, saying "At the same time, it is a real wrench for me to leave Ambridge. The Archers is an extraordinary programme – a jewel at the heart of the BBC and in the hearts of the British public. Working on it, with the extraordinary cast, writers and production team in Birmingham has been an absolute privilege. The Archers has been a part of my life for much of my life - and though I'll be away from Borsetshire, I'll continue to listen to the villagers of Ambridge, who feel to me – as they do for millions of listeners - like family."

O'Connor's first episode as executive producer aired on 11 July 2016. Although O'Connor's first credited episode aired in July, his own creative work was not seen onscreen until late September. O'Connor's tenure as executive producer has generally been received as negative by viewers and former cast alike, primarily his decision to kill off sisters Ronnie and Roxy Mitchell in a swimming pool freak accident which elicited strong reactions from viewers and has been regarded as one of the "worst decisions in [soap opera] history". Diederick Santer, who introduced the Mitchell sisters whilst executive producer between 2006 and 2010, said that whilst he commended O'Connor for producing "brilliant work at The Archers", the direction he had taken EastEnders in had made it "unwatchable". Barbara Windsor, who played the sister's on-screen aunt, described the decision to Hello magazine as "a mistake." whilst former executive producer Dominic Treadwell-Collins also criticised the sisters' axing, adding that he was "really sad" to see them go. His decision to recast original character Michelle Fowler to actress Jenna Russell was criticised by viewers, who argued that the recast "just [wasn't] working". In June 2017, The Sun reported that O'Connor had been axed from EastEnders for bullying cast members as well as the soap's drop in ratings, however O'Connor denied this and The Sun were ordered to pay "substantial damages". The BBC announced that O'Connor would be leaving EastEnders on 23 June after a year in the role of executive producer. cast members said: "I've had an amazing time at EastEnders. Working with the editorial staff, cast and crew at Elstree has been an absolute privilege". O'Connor's final episode as Executive Producer aired on 24 November 2017. Following his departure, former cast member Ross Kemp, who played Grant Mitchell in the soap accused O'Connor of "treating the cast badly" and "working them into the ground". He was however defended by Samantha Womack, who despite her character being killed off [by O'Connor] said that "her heart [went] out to him and everyone struggling in the show".

== Directing ==
As a graduate of the Regional Theatre Young Directors' Scheme, O'Connor has worked all over the UK as a theatre director. His work has featured at Liverpool Everyman, Hornchurch, Salisbury Playhouse, Chester Gateway, Windsor, Guilford, Bath, Richmond, Chichester, Cardiff and Edinburgh. In 1995, O'Connor directed the UK premiere of Dorothy Parker's drama, The Ladies of the Corridor (1953) at the Finborough Theatre and the first London revival of Christa Winsloe's Children in Uniform (1931) (Mädchen in Uniform) at Battersea Arts Centre. He is also a graduate of the BBC Drama Directors' Course.

== Writing ==
Handsome Brute ISBN 978-1471101335, a study of the murders of Neville Heath in the 1940s, was published in 2013 by Simon & Schuster.

O'Connor has made a study of 20th Century drama, particularly neglected or forgotten works. In 1997, he published Straight Acting; Popular Gay Drama from Wilde to Rattigan, examining the work of British gay playwrights who dominated the West End in the 20th Century. Dartmouth's Professor of Gender Studies, Michael Bronski, praised the book, claiming that it "almost single-handedly reinvents what we think of as the history of modern gay theater".

The same year, he adapted and directed the play Vertigo based on the novel D'Entre Les Morts by Pierre Boileau and Thomas Narcejac, which was the inspiration for Alfred Hitchcock's film of 1958. This, the first stage adaptation of the story, retained the original French wartime setting of the novel. The play first appeared at Chester Gateway Theatre featuring Marcus D'Amico, but was subsequently produced by Bill Kenwright at the Theatre Royal Windsor starring Martin Shaw and Jenny Seagrove. A revival at the Yvonne Arnaud Theatre in Guildford starred Anthony Andrews in the central role, replacing Martin Shaw.

In 2001, O'Connor adapted Winston Graham's 1960 novel Marnie for the stage which played at Chester Gateway Theatre and The Haymarket Theatre, Basingstoke. The adaptation returned the story to Graham's original post-war British setting and preserved Graham's bleak ending.

In 2010, O'Connor adapted Shakespeare's Romeo and Juliet as Juliet and Her Romeo which played at Bristol Old Vic, directed by Tom Morris and starring Siân Phillips, Michael Byrne and Dudley Sutton.

The sensational murder trial of Alma Rattenbury provides the subject for O'Connor's 2019 non-fiction work The Fatal Passion of Alma Rattenbury .

In October 2019 O’Connor released The Haunting Of Borley Rectory.
