= Jenna Russell =

British actress

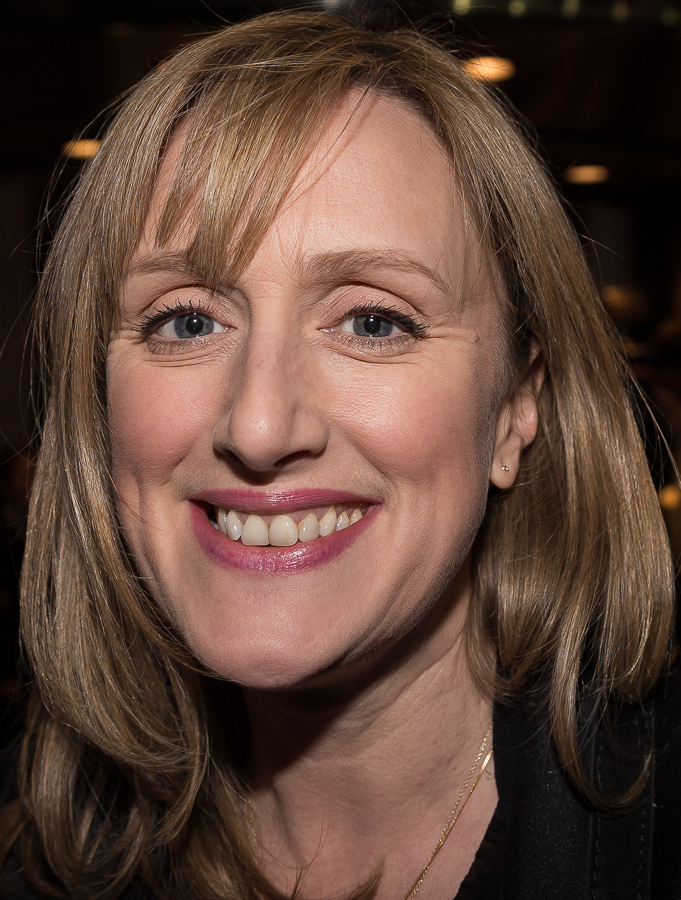
- Russell at the WhatsOnStage Awards 2015
- Born: Jenna Russell; 5 October 1967 (age 58); London, England
- Occupation: Actress
- Years active: 1983–present
- Partner: Ray Coulthard
- Children: 1

Jenna Russell (born 5 October 1967) is an English actress and singer. She has appeared on the stage in London in both musicals and dramas, as well as appearing with the Royal Shakespeare Company. She performed the role of Dot in Sunday in the Park with George in the West End and on Broadway, receiving the Tony Award nomination and the 2006 Olivier Award for Best Actress in a Musical for her role. She has also appeared in several television series, including Born and Bred and EastEnders.

== Life and career ==
Russell was born in London, grew up in Dundee, and attended the Sylvia Young Theatre School. She has said she had a "tricky childhood".

In 1985, Russell appeared as Matthew's girlfriend Christine in the ITV comedy Home to Roost.

Russell also sang the closing theme tune for the BBC sitcom Red Dwarf, with her version of the song being used in all series of the show. Russell began her career as an understudy for Eponine and Fantine and later took over Fantine in Les Misérables and performed with the Royal Shakespeare Company (RSC) for the first portion of her career. Plays there included The Beggar's Opera as Lucy Lockit in April 1992 and again in April 1993 at the Barbican Centre. She also appeared in the RSC production of Alan Ayckbourn's Wildest Dreams at the Barbican in December 1993.

From 1990 to 1992, she played one of the lead characters, Maggie Lomax, in primetime BBC TV comedy On the Up.

She performed in three shows at The Bridewell Theatre: On a Clear Day You Can See Forever as Daisy (January 2000), Hello Again (March 2001) and a concert, The Cutting Edge in June 2000. Other stage work includes Samantha Lord in High Society at Sheffield Crucible, Young Sally in Follies at the Shaftesbury Theatre in 1987, Bertrande in Martin Guerre at the West End's Prince Edward theatre (1998), Felicity in Landslide at the West Yorkshire Playhouse in Leeds, and Three Sisters at the Royal Court.

She left the cast of Songs for a New World during rehearsal to play Deborah Gilder in the television series Born and Bred in 2002 through 2005.

In 2005, she appeared as the Floor Manager in the Doctor Who episodes "Bad Wolf" and "The Parting of the Ways". Also in 2005, she played the lead role of Sarah Brown in the West End production of Guys and Dolls opposite (at various times) Ewan McGregor, Nigel Harman, Sarah Lancashire, Jane Krakowski and Nigel Lindsay. She received a nomination for the 2006 Laurence Olivier Award for Best Actress in a Musical for this role. In 2006, she took over from Anna-Jane Casey as Dot/Marie in the London revival of Sunday in the Park with George, by Stephen Sondheim for which she won the 2007 Olivier Award for Best Actress in a Musical.

She subsequently played Amy alongside Felicity Kendal in the West End revival of the play Amy's View in 2006. In 2008, Russell reprised her role as Dot in the Broadway transfer of Sunday in the Park with George. The production opened on 21 February 2008 and ran until 29 June 2008 at Studio 54. Russell won the Theatre World Award and received Drama Desk Award and Tony Award nominations for Best Actress in a Musical, losing to Patti LuPone.

In 2009, she appeared in the inaugural episode of the resurrected TV series Minder as Petra.

Russell has appeared in Into the Woods twice. For the Donmar Warehouse production in 1998, she played Cinderella. For the Regent's Park Open Air Theatre in 2010, she played the role of the Baker's Wife.

In August 2012, Russell took to the London stage again at the Soho Theatre in Soho Cinders. She then played the role of Mary in Stephen Sondheim's Merrily We Roll Along at the Harold Pinter Theatre in London's West End, following a run at the Menier Chocolate Factory.

From February 2014, she appeared as Penelope Pennywise in the London production of Urinetown: The Musical at the St. James Theatre. She reprised the role for the West End production at the Apollo Theatre from September 2014.

In January 2016, she starred with Sheila Hancock in the first UK production of Grey Gardens at The Southwark Playhouse to sell-out audiences.

In December 2016, she took over from previous actress Susan Tully in the role of Michelle Fowler in BBC One soap-opera EastEnders. In 2018, Russell decided to leave EastEnders to pursue other work. Her last appearance aired on Tuesday 17 April 2018.

In September 2022, Russell led the cast in Alan Ayckbourn's Woman in Mind at Chichester Festival Theatre.

== Stage ==
Year	Title	Role	Theatre
1987	Follies	Young Sally	Shaftesbury Theatre
1991–1992	Les Misérables	Fantine	Palace Theatre
1998–1999	Into the Woods	Cinderella	Donmar Warehouse
2001	Les Misérables	Fantine	Palace Theatre
2005–2006	Guys and Dolls	Sister Sarah Brown	Piccadilly Theatre
2006	Sunday in the Park with George	Dot / Marie	Wyndham's Theatre
2008	Sunday in the Park with George	Dot / Marie	Studio 54
2010	Into the Woods	The Baker's Wife	Regent's Park Open Air Theatre
2012	Soho Cinders	Marilyn Platt	Soho Theatre
2012–2013	Merrily We Roll Along	Mary Flynn	Menier Chocolate Factory / Harold Pinter Theatre
2014–2015	Urinetown	Penelope Pennywise	St. James Theatre / Apollo Theatre
2016	Grey Gardens	Edith Bouvier Beale/Edith Ewing Bouvier Beale	Southwark Playhouse
2018	Fun Home	Helen Bechdel	Young Vic
2019	The Bridges of Madison County	Francesca Johnson	Menier Chocolate Factory
2021	Piaf	Edith Piaf	Nottingham Playhouse
2022	Woman in Mind	Susan	Chichester Festival Theatre
2023	Flowers for Mrs Harris	Ada Harris	Riverside Studios
2024	Hello, Dolly!	Irene Molloy	London Palladium
2025	Dirty Rotten Scoundrels	Muriel Eubanks	Tokyu Theatre Orb
2025	The Unlikely Pilgrimage of Harold Fry	Maureen Fry	Chichester Festival Theatre
2026	The Unlikely Pilgrimage of Harold Fry	Maureen Fry	Theatre Royal Haymarket
2026	Sinatra: The Musical	Dolly Sinatra	Aldwych Theatre

== Awards and nominations ==
Year	Award	Category	Work	Result	Ref.
2006	Laurence Olivier Award	Best Actress in a Musical	Guys and Dolls	Nominated	
2007	Laurence Olivier Award	Best Actress in a Musical	Sunday in the Park with George	Won	
2008	Tony Award	Best Actress in a Musical	Sunday in the Park with George	Nominated	
2008	Drama Desk Award	Outstanding Actress in a Musical	Sunday in the Park with George	Nominated	
2008	Drama League Award	Distinguished Performance	Sunday in the Park with George	Nominated	
2008	Theatre World Award		Sunday in the Park with George	Honouree	
2014	Laurence Olivier Award	Best Actress in a Musical	Merrily We Roll Along	Nominated	
2015	WhatsOnStage Awards	Best Actress in a Musical	Urinetown	Nominated	
2017	WhatsOnStage Awards	Best Supporting Actress in a Play	Doctor Faustus	Nominated	
2026	Laurence Olivier Award	Best Actress in a Musical	The Unlikely Pilgrimage of Harold Fry	Nominated	

== Personal life ==
Russell is the partner of actor Ray Coulthard, and they are the parents of a girl. Russell revealed that she was in the early stages of her pregnancy when she appeared in Sunday in the Park with George on Broadway.

== Bibliography ==
- Broadway.com interview, 21 February 2008
- Official London Theatre interview, 21 February 2006
