= Lydia Simmonds =

Fictional character from EastEnders

- EastEnders character
- Heather Chasen as Lydia Simmonds
- Portrayed by: Margaret Tyzack and Heather Chasen
- First appearance: Episode 4189; 5 April 2011
- Last appearance: Episode 4229; 14 June 2011
- Introduced by: Bryan Kirkwood
- Margaret Tyzack as Lydia Simmonds
In-universe information
- Sons: Norman Simmonds
- Daughters: June Butcher
- Grandsons: Ricky Butcher
- Granddaughters: Clare Butcher; Diane Butcher; Janine Butcher
- Other relatives: Jacques Butcher; Liam Butcher; Tiffany Butcher; Scarlett Butcher

Lydia Simmonds is a fictional character from the BBC soap opera EastEnders, initially played by Margaret Tyzack and then by Heather Chasen. She is the maternal grandmother of Ricky (Sid Owen) and Janine Butcher (Charlie Brooks). She made her debut on 5 April 2011, was portrayed by Tyzack, who left the show for health reasons on 13 April, and appeared as Lydia in three episodes before dying on 25 June 2011. Chasen appeared in the role from 21 April. The character was killed-off and Chasen made her last appearance on 13 June 2011, and, though not credited for it, did a voice-over for the 14 June episode. Executive producer Bryan Kirkwood later said that Lydia's storyline was perfect and that Chasen made the part of Lydia her own.

Described as "brilliantly funny" and a "cantankerous, rich old bag of a grannie", EastEnders star Natalie Cassidy (who plays Sonia Fowler) praised the introduction of Lydia, whilst a writer for the Daily Mirror said the bond between Lydia and Janine was the "most touching and entertaining in Soapland." Kirkwood later stated that he had a "soft spot" for Lydia's last episode and Metro's Rachel Tarley deemed Lydia "brilliantly funny."

== Casting and introduction ==
"After the tragic departure of Margaret Tyzack, Heather Chasen quickly made the part of Lydia her own – and it was bittersweet that we'd always planned that Lydia would die. That was the story we embarked on – we're following a very clear thread for Janine and it's going to get more interesting as time goes on."

— Bryan Kirkwood describing the recast

The character and casting were announced on 15 February 2011, and of her casting, Tyzack said "I am delighted to be joining a great British tradition and a fine company of actors", and Executive Producer Bryan Kirkwood said: "What a coup to have Margaret Tyzack starring in EastEnders. She is an actress of incredible class and talent. Lydia has endless possibilities as a character, and I can't wait to see Janine meet her match." Described as twisted, manipulative, damaged and "[a] lady of class and dignity", an EastEnders source revealed that Lydia is more of a schemer than Janine, saying "Janine is going to think there's a potential meal ticket arriving in the form of Lydia. But she's a very complex woman—and Janine won't be able to manipulate her as easily as she'd imagined." The Mirror said if viewers thought "characters don’t come any more twisted than evil Janine, they haven’t met her granny yet." EastEnders executive producer stated that Lydia was introduced to help explore Janine's fun side. Kirkwood said to Inside Soap:"After the stories she's had lately, it's time for Janine to have some fun, I think. We've got Margaret Tyzack with us now, filming her first scenes as Janine's wicked granny Lydia Simmonds. I reckon it's a meeting of the minds – and a glimpse into the future for Janine!"

On 13 April 2011, it was reported that Tyzack had pulled out of the role for personal reasons. After Tyzack's death on 25 June 2011, it was confirmed that she had withdrawn due to her health. Two episodes featuring Tyzack had already been broadcast, and she featured in a further one on 14 April. It was announced that 83-year-old (at the time of casting) Heather Chasen, who was previously best known for playing "super bitch" Valerie Pollard in ITV soap opera, Crossroads, would replace Tyzack in the role, beginning filming on 15 April for scenes to be broadcast from 21 April. Lydia dies on-screen on 13 June 2011. Chasen supplied a voiceover for the 14 June episode but was not credited. After Lydia's departure, George Layton was later introduced as her son, Norman.

== Development ==
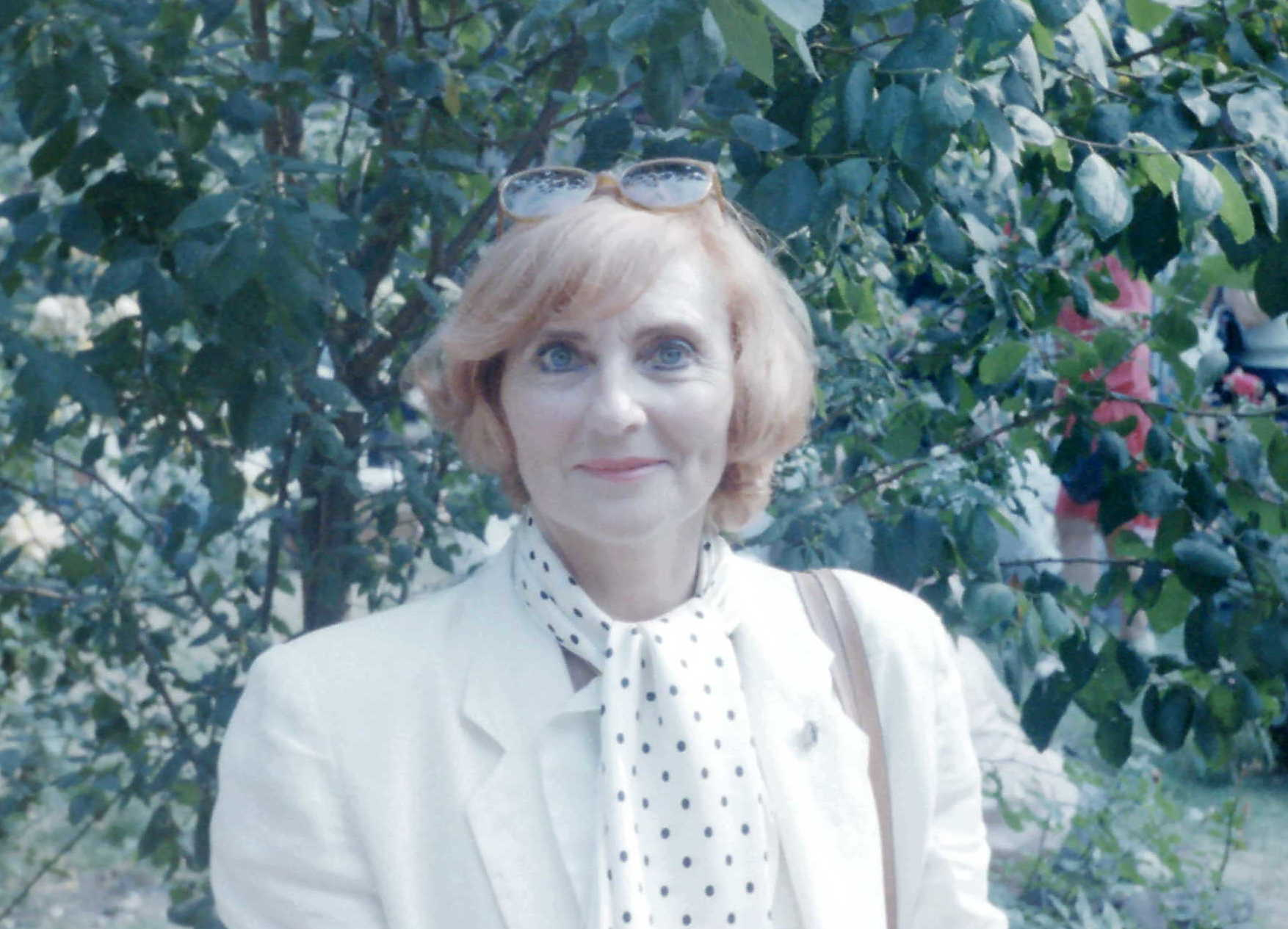
Heather Chasen (pictured) was the second actress to play Lydia.

Brooks revealed in an exclusive interview with Inside Soap the effect Lydia has had on Janine saying, "Janine had no idea how much she'd fall in love with her grandma. [...] She recognises a lot of herself in Lydia, and finally understands where she gets a lot of her traits. It's nice to see the more vulnerable side of Janine and explore why she's turned out the way that she has. Having got to know her gran, Janine regrets not getting in touch with Lydia sooner. She didn't realise Lydia cared—she thought she was just another family member who'd neglected her. Janine feels tremendously sad." Brooks also said Janine would feel 'hurt' and 'furious' of people thinking she killed Lydia saying, "[Pat] actually accuses Janine of killing Lydia. Janine's hurt but also nonchalant about it. Janine denies it of course, but it's frustrating for her as this is one of the first times in her life that she is genuinely telling the truth. She's stunned. Lydia died of natural causes, so Janine can't understand the police interest."

Brooks said of the storyline as a whole, "I absolutely loved exploring Janine's background, I wanted to figure out why she behaves like she does. I was really proud with the scenes with Heather Chasen [Lydia]. It was really hard work, but worth it." Discussing Janine's true motivation, Brooks said: "Lydia has money! Janine remembers visiting her gran's house, so she knows she's got a few quid. But their reunion is quite frosty to begin with and Lydia acts like she doesn't want anything to do with Janine. But of course, there's no way Janine will give up that easily – not when she stands to pocket that tidy sum." After Lydia's death, it was reported that Janine will be accused of killing her. Janine is said to be "shell-shocked" when Lydia dies and when Pat and Janine's husband Ryan Malloy (Neil McDermott) see her in The Queen Victoria public house, Ryan calls the police and accuses her of murdering Lydia in order to inherit her estate.

== Storylines ==
Lydia's backstory states that she never wanted a son, Norman Simmonds (George Layton) and doted on her daughter June. Although Lydia loved June, she hated the man her daughter was married to, Frank Butcher (Mike Reid). When June died from cancer in 1987, Lydia grew old alone and lived a life of solitude.

Lydia is first seen when Janine visits her in hospital and realises that Lydia needs somewhere to stay. Lydia says she will sell her house and go into care, then sends Janine to her house to take photos, knowing that Janine will see how valuable the house is. Janine then invites Lydia to stay with her, and Lydia refuses, so Janine says that it is what Janine's mother and Lydia's daughter, June, would have wanted, so Lydia agrees. Although Janine believes she has manipulated Lydia, Lydia reveals to her nurse that she had in fact manipulated Janine. Lydia moves in and receives a letter that Janine tries to look at. Lydia tells Janine that she knows she is only interested in her money and wants her dead, but says Janine will have a long wait. On the wedding of Prince William and Kate Middleton she attends Dot Branning's (June Brown) street party but insults her great-granddaughter Tiffany Butcher (Maisie Smith) so Dot wheels her to The Queen Victoria public house where she watches the wedding. She is seated in front of the television, blocking everyone's view, so Winston (Ulric Browne) wheels her out of the way, pulling the cable out of the television, which causes it to lose picture. Lydia then manages to sell her house and so moves her belongings into Janine's flat and removes a canvas picture of Frank from Janine's living room. Janine disapproves but is forced to let her stay permanently. Later, Lydia then patronises everyone including Pat Evans (Pam St Clement), Frank's mistress when he was still married to June. After moving in some furniture, Lydia struggles to stand, insisting she does not need help from Janine and slaps her when she tries to. While Janine is out, Lydia tries to reach her pills but falls out of her wheelchair. Janine is shocked to find her on the floor when she returns, and then helps her up. Lydia is unable to have an operation and is just put on stronger medicine. Lydia tells Janine that she will be fine, but Janine finds out from Dr. Yusef Khan (Ace Bhatti) that she is worse than she says. Lydia bonds with Tiffany whilst she and Janine are looking after her. Janine tells Lydia that she likes having her around and wants her to stay. However, she wakes up one night saying she has seen June. She talks to Janine about her funeral and will, but Janine says she would rather have Lydia's photos of June than her money. Lydia asks to see the sun rise and hear the dawn chorus, and Janine opens the window for her. After this, Lydia quietly dies in her wheelchair and Janine is left in a state of shock. It's later revealed that Lydia altered her will before her death and left her entire estate to Janine. Lydia's son, Norman, later warns that he is going to contest Lydia's will but later decides not to.

== Reception ==
EastEnders actress Natalie Cassidy praised the introduction of Lydia saying, "Margaret Tyzack is joining EastEnders as Janine's evil gran. I've seen her in a play before, so I'm sure she'll be fantastic." Kirkwood chose the episode in which Lydia died in Janine's arms as his favourite of the year. A writer for the Daily Mirror branded Lydia "a cantankerous, rich old bag of a grannie", but added that she was "a lady bountiful, selfless philanthropist and all-round good egg." The writer went on to say that the bond between Janine and Lydia turned into "one of the most touching and entertaining in Soapland." The Metro's Rachel Tarley deemed Lydia "brilliantly funny."
