= Janine Butcher =

- EastEnders character
- Charlie Brooks as Janine Butcher (2022)
- Portrayed by: Rebecca Michael (1989–1993); Alexia Demetriou (1993–1996); Charlie Brooks (1999–present)
- Duration: 1989–1996; 1999–2004; 2008–2014; 2021–2022; 2026–present
- First appearance: Episode 457; 22 June 1989
- Introduced by: Mike Gibbon (1989); Matthew Robinson (1999); Diederick Santer (2008); Jon Sen (2021); Ben Wadey (2026)
- Spin-off appearances: Pudding Lane (1999); Last Tango in Walford (2010); EastEnders: E20 (2011); First Dates for Children in Need (2021)
In-universe information
- Other names: Janine Evans; Janine Malloy; Janine Carter
- Occupation: Student; Shop assistant; Waitress; Estate agent; Prostitute; Car saleswoman; Barmaid; Bar manager; Bookmaker; Businesswoman; Nightclub owner; Pub landlady
- Father: Frank Butcher
- Mother: June Butcher
- Stepmother: Pat Butcher; Peggy Mitchell
- Brothers: Ricky Butcher
- Sisters: Clare Butcher; Diane Butcher
- Half-brothers: Danny
- Husband: Barry Evans (2003–2004); David (2008); Ryan Malloy (2010–2012); Michael Moon (2012–2013); Mick Carter (2022)
- Daughters: Scarlett Butcher
- Stepsons: Jack Evans; Tommy Moon; Lee Carter; Johnny Carter; Ollie Carter
- Stepdaughters: Lily Slater; Frankie Lewis; Nancy Carter
- Grandmothers: Mo Butcher; Lydia Simmonds
- Uncles: Norman Simmonds
- Aunts: Joan Garwood
- Nephews: Liam Butcher; Jacques Butcher
- Nieces: Tiffany Butcher

Janine Butcher (also Evans, Malloy and Carter) is a fictional character from the BBC soap opera EastEnders, introduced in 1989. The character is played by Rebecca Michael, Alexia Demetriou and Charlie Brooks, respectively. Brooks initially departed on 7 May 2004. She returned for a three episode guest stint in April 2008 before a permanent return on 18 December that year. Brooks took a break from September 2012 until April 2013 before departing in March 2014. In April 2021, it was announced that Brooks would reprise the role for a third stint, from September 2021 until her departure in December 2022. In 2026, Brooks returned for a fourth stint, which began airing that November.

The character has been described as a "super-bitch" and a "classic villainess". She has proven popular with critics and fans of the show. Her storylines typically involve her in an antagonistic role. She has been married five times: to Barry Evans (Shaun Williamson), whom she killed on New Year's Day 2004; David (Harry Towb), who died on their wedding day; Ryan Malloy (Neil McDermott); Michael Moon (Steve John Shepherd); and Mick Carter (Danny Dyer) who "died" on Christmas Day 2022, a day after their wedding. Her feuds include a long-standing conflict with former stepmothers Pat Butcher (Pam St Clement) and Peggy Mitchell (Barbara Windsor). She also had feuds with Sonia Fowler (Natalie Cassidy), Laura Beale (Hannah Waterman), Kat (Jessie Wallace), Zoe (Michelle Ryan), Lynne (Elaine Lordan), Stacey (Lacey Turner), and Jean Slater (Gillian Wright), Bianca Jackson (Patsy Palmer), Ronnie Mitchell (Samantha Womack), Roxy Mitchell (Rita Simons), Sharon Watts (Letitia Dean), Jada Lennox (Kelsey Calladine-Smith), Shirley Carter (Linda Henry), and Linda Carter (Kellie Bright). Her initial departure saw Janine being wrongfully charged for the death of Laura Beale. Upon her return, she attends her father's funeral and wake. Later that year, Janine is caught forging a wedding to a wealthy, old-aged pensioner, which ends with her new husband abruptly dying of a heart attack upon discovering her false identity. She later accidentally kills local resident Danielle Jones (Lauren Crace) by running her down; conspires with Peggy's husband Archie (Larry Lamb) to defraud the Mitchell family from their ownership of The Queen Victoria public house; and becomes a prime suspect in Archie's murder investigation (Who Killed Archie?). Janine later becomes involved in a love triangle with her third husband, Ryan, and his baby's mother, Stacey. All of this results in Janine framing Stacey for her attempted murder and also attempting to kill Ryan by poisoning him. Janine later gives birth to a daughter, Scarlett, with her fourth husband, Michael, and they become embroiled in a custody battle, which leads to Janine murdering Michael, prompting her second departure from the show after she was acquitted for his murder.

In Brooks' third stint as Janine, her storylines include being in a custody battle for Scarlett (now Tabitha Byron) with Kat, accidentally starting a fire that almost kills Scarlett and Kat's son Tommy Moon (Sonny Kendall), reigniting her feuds with both Kat and Stacey, framing Jay Brown (Jamie Borthwick) for car theft, manipulating a separation between Mick and Linda Carter in order to have him to herself, regaining custody of Scarlett, a feud with Linda in which she frames her for a car accident, blackmailing Jada into helping her bring Linda down, discovering she is pregnant with Mick's child and later marrying him, before being widowed the following day after another car accident with Linda that she indirectly caused, leading to her arrest and fourth departure from the show.

== Creation ==
=== Casting ===
The character was first mentioned in September 1987, when her father Frank Butcher (Mike Reid) first appeared on-screen. Frank and his children Ricky Butcher (Sid Owen) and Diane Butcher (Sophie Lawrence) were introduced as regular characters in 1988. However, Janine did not become a regular character until a year later, in June 1989, her arrival completing the Butcher family.

Janine was initially seen as a 6-year-old, played by Rebecca Michael. In 1993, following a storyline that saw her stepmother Pat Butcher (Pam St Clement) imprisoned for manslaughter, Janine was sent to stay with her off-screen sister Clare Butcher, but she returned later that year, played by 11-year-old Alexia Demetriou, who appeared as Janine from 14 October 1993 until 12 March 1996, when the character was written out again, as Demetriou left to concentrate on her studies. Executive producer Matthew Robinson re-introduced Janine in 1999 as a 16-year-old, played by Charlie Brooks. On her getting the part, Brooks said, "It's funny, but for as long as I can remember I knew I was going to make it, I never worried about my career or money, and when I left college I was headstrong and confident and felt very grown. Then I joined EastEnders and I felt like a lost little girl. I remember the casting director taking me to meet Patsy Palmer on my first day there and, because I'd been watching EastEnders since I was little, I actually felt sick".

=== Characterisation ===
Janine's backstory states that she was born just four years before her mother, June, died from cancer, and Janine subsequently went to live with her sister Clare (Lucy Foxell; Caroline O'Neill). Eventually, Janine's father, Frank (Mike Reid), moved to Walford with her older siblings Ricky (Sid Owen) and Diane (Sophie Lawrence), as well as with his beloved wife Pat Wicks (Pam St Clement). Soon afterwards, Clare moved to Manchester in 1989, leaving Janine with Pat and Frank.

Janine is described by the EastEnders website as a "brutal minx whose motto is that money can buy happiness. She will manipulate, marry and murder once she's had a sniff of the Queen's head." It continues: "Janine's a great actress who enjoys seducing people, but the clever diva doesn't always get the end results she desires, which has even led to her imprisonment."

Underneath the hard exterior she's really a little girl lost, who wants to love and be loved more than anything – just don't expect her to admit it!"

— The BBC describes Janine (2011)

== Development ==
=== Drug addiction ===
In 2002, a storyline saw Janine using drugs and prostituting to fund the habit. She was shown about to snort cocaine in a scene that sparked viewer complaints to the BBC. Brooks has said about Janine's behaviour: "Sleeping with her pusher is very sad and desperate. But she feels she has to do it to get more drugs. Janine has such low self-esteem that she's deliberately reckless. She thinks, 'Why not take drugs if they make me feel good about myself for a while?' I think she knows she's on a slippery slope but she believes she can get out of it like she's always done before."

=== Departure (2004) ===
The character was written out of the series in the spring of 2004 when Janine was falsely charged with the murder of Laura Beale (Hannah Waterman) and remanded in custody. Pat Evans (Pam St Clement) refuses to give Janine an alibi due to her awareness that Janine murdered Barry Evans (Shaun Williamson) earlier in the year. According to Williamson, prior to his resignation storyliners planned for Barry to kill Janine.

Brooks rejected an offer to re-appear in late 2005 for the murder trial, although BBC bosses did persuade Mike Reid to make his final appearances as Frank Butcher for scenes involving his former wife Pat during the duration of the trial. Janine was present off-screen for the duration of the trial.

=== Reintroduction (2008) ===
Four years after her initial departure, Brooks was asked to reprise the role by executive producer Diederick Santer as part of a storyline that was dubbed "Frank Week". Mike Reid died in July 2007, and due to the popularity of the character he played, Santer decided that Frank would also be killed off in the serial. A funeral was held for the character as a tribute to both the actor and the "iconic" character he played. Brooks was one of several actors brought back to the show especially for the storyline. She was joined by Sophie Lawrence, who played her older sister Diane Butcher, and Sid Owen as her brother Ricky.

Following the conclusion of her three episode guest stint in April 2008, it was announced the following month that Brooks would reprise her role as Janine on a full-time basis. Brooks said she was "thrilled" to be back and admitted her recent appearance gave her "a taste" of being Janine again. Executive producer, Santer, said her recent appearances "reminded us what a fine actress she is, and what an intriguing, watchable and engaging character she plays as Janine". He promised a longer spell on the programme would enable viewers to see "what makes Janine tick" and also find out where she got the "flashy big black car" with which she was seen at the funeral. Janine's return scenes aired in December 2008. In June 2009, she signed a three-year contract.

=== Relationship with Ryan Malloy ===
In December 2009, the show's executive producer, Diederick Santer teased about upcoming storylines involving Janine and her flatmate Ryan Malloy (Neil McDermott), saying: "There's something really interesting with Ryan and Janine [...]. They're both people who don't know how to love. So will they fall in love? And if they do, can they cope with it? Will they understand the alien feelings coursing through their bodies?" In August 2010, Janine proposes to Ryan. Brooks said that the idea of getting married would be daunting for the character, but added that she believes Janine is genuinely in love with Ryan. She commented: "It's easy to assume that Janine is playing games or using him for sex, but [...] Ryan clearly adores her too, so he may be the man to tame her wild ways." Brooks hinted at possible trouble for the couple if Janine discovers that Ryan fathered a baby with local resident Stacey Slater (Lacey Turner), saying "Janine will be absolutely destroyed when she finds out. She wants Ryan all to herself, and the idea of a baby snatching his attention away would be devastating. All she needs is to be loved." McDermott stated that he believed Ryan was the right man for Janine, and that they could be perfect for each other, saying: "Janine's never loved any of the men she's been with before. She has only ever been in it for the money. Ryan understands her and knows why she does the things she does. They both forgive one another's mistakes very easily, and that's why their partnership works."

=== Lydia Simmonds ===
In February 2011, Janine's estranged grandmother, Lydia Simmonds, "a lady of class and dignity," was announced. Lydia's backstory states that she loved her daughter June but hated the man she married, Frank, so she grew old alone. Lydia and Janine have been estranged for many years and Janine is shocked to have her grandmother back in her life. Executive Producer Bryan Kirkwood said: "I can't wait to see Janine meet her match."

An EastEnders source revealed that Lydia is more of a schemer than Janine, saying "Janine is going to think there's a potential meal ticket arriving in the form of Lydia. But she's a very complex woman—and Janine won't be able to manipulate her as easily as she'd imagined." EastEnders executive producer stated that Lydia was introduced to help explore Janine's fun side. Kirkwood said to Inside Soap: "After the stories she's had lately, it's time for Janine to have some fun, I think."

=== Sabbatical and second departure (2014) ===
In February 2012, Brooks announced that she would take a six-month break from the show later in the year, and departed on 14 September. Brooks returned to filming on 21 February 2013 and returned on screen on 18 April that year. On 28 October 2013, it was announced that Brooks had decided to leave the show for a third time, but to allow for her to return again, the character would not be killed off. Following Janine's arrest on Christmas Day, she returned to screens on 24 February 2014 when Kat (Jessie Wallace) and Stacey Slater (Lacey Turner) visited her in prison, and last appeared on 20 March 2014.

=== Reintroduction, third departure, and fourth return (2021–2022, 2026) ===
In April 2021, numerous media outlets revealed that Janine would return later in the year, as Brooks had agreed to reprise the role once again for a "huge storyline". The show officially confirmed her return on 14 June. The announcement of Janine's return was positively received by fans of the show especially on social media. Speaking of her return, executive producer Jon Sen commented that "she comes back as the character that we all know and love her as" and added "we'd be robbing the audience if we didn't bring her back in all her glory!" Janine returned on-screen on 6 September 2021 after returning to filming two months earlier.

It was announced on 24 September 2022 that Brooks had once again decided to leave the show after more than a year back in the role, with her final scenes airing on 26 December 2022 after Janine was arrested for perverting the course of justice.

In May 2023, Brooks refused to rule out another future return for the character. In October 2026, it was revealed that Brooks would reprise the role for an upcoming storyline. She returned during the 5 November episode.

== Storylines ==
=== 1989–1996 ===
A troublesome child, Janine throws tantrums, runs away, is a bed-wetter, a sleep-walker, a thief, a compulsive liar and a self-harmer, and hates Pat. Unable to discipline her, Pat forces Frank to take Janine to family therapy, which somehow helps. Janine refuses to go to school and Ricky finds out she is being bullied. When Frank has a breakdown and disappears in 1994, Janine stays with Pat but finds Frank's absence upsetting.

Janine makes friends with Clare Bates (Gemma Bissix) and Sonia Jackson (Natalie Cassidy) and they cause trouble for Felix Kawalski (Harry Landis), when they spread rumours that he is a pervert who murdered his wife, and keeps her body in his cellar. She is overjoyed when Frank returns, and they move to Manchester in 1996. However, Frank returns to Walford in 1998, leaving Janine with Clare.

=== 1999–2004 ===
In June 1999, Janine returns to live with Frank and his new wife, Peggy Mitchell (Barbara Windsor). She sets about coming between them, constantly trying to antagonise Frank with rebellious behaviour. In December 1999, she sleeps with Jamie Mitchell (Jack Ryder) and humiliates him by spreading rumours about his inadequate prowess. In November 2000, Frank abandons Janine after the breakdown of his marriage to Peggy. Homeless, Janine is taken in by Terry Raymond (Gavin Richards); they start a business together as estate agents. Terry sees Janine as a surrogate daughter, but Janine's constant manipulation tests his patience. Janine uses him for money, deliberately dresses like his late daughter Tiffany Mitchell (Martine McCutcheon), ruins his relationships with women and tries to seduce him. In 2001, Janine also has a relationship with Jamie's uncle Billy Mitchell (Perry Fenwick) until he runs out of money. This behaviour infuriates Terry but Janine starts using cocaine and pesters Terry for money to feed her habit. When he refuses, in 2002, she resorts to sex with her drug dealer, Lee Vickers (Dermot Keaney), in exchange for cocaine; Vickers beats Terry up when he tries to warn him off. When he sees Janine's lack of remorse, Terry throws her out and leaves Walford, ignoring her pleas for him to stay.

Owing Vickers money for drugs, Janine turns to prostitution under the alias "Blonde Bombshell". One of her clients, Matt Lindsay (Matthew Steer), falls in love with her and proposes marriage, but attempts suicide when he learns she is still a prostitute. In May 2002, Ian Beale (Adam Woodyatt) begins using her services but she blackmails him, threatening to tell his wife Laura Beale (Hannah Waterman) unless he pays her. Depressed, in August 2002, Janine begins drinking heavily and nearly dies of alcohol poisoning. She gives up prostitution, but when Laura discovers that she has been having sex with Ian, she throws a pan of boiling milk in Janine's face. As a result, Janine becomes agoraphobic and eats dog food because she is too afraid to go outside to buy food. She eventually gets over this with Billy's help. Janine hopes to rekindle their relationship but is devastated when she learns that he is in love with Little Mo Morgan (Kacey Ainsworth).

In 2003, Janine gets a job working at Barry Evans' (Shaun Williamson) car lot after becoming friendly with Barry, following the death of his father and Pat's husband Roy Evans (Tony Caunter). She and her friend, Paul Trueman (Gary Beadle) plan to fleece Barry out of his money. She seduces Barry and moves in with him, but also sleeps with Paul. Eventually, Barry proposes to Janine, and she accepts, thinking that Barry has a life-threatening heart murmur. They marry on New Year's Eve 2003 in Scotland, but Janine is furious when Barry's illness turns out to be a false alarm. They take a stroll around the hills and cliffs on New Year's Day 2004, but Janine cracks and admits everything. Barry refuses to believe that she does not love him and tries to embrace her. Repulsed, Janine pushes him away and he falls down a cliff, fatally hitting his head on a rock; Janine then watches him die. As his widow, Janine inherits Barry's estate and has him cremated in Scotland, denying his friends and family a chance to pay their respects. This makes Barry's ex-wife Natalie Evans (Lucy Speed) suspicious, and she becomes close to Paul, who feels guilty about his role in Barry's death. Spurred on by Natalie, Paul gives a statement to the police, implicating Janine in Barry's death.

Janine is arrested, but released without charge, due to lack of evidence, and spitefully tells Natalie that she has managed to get away with murder; however, telling Pat proves to be her downfall. Pat is also friends with Laura, who has a feud with Janine, who in turn angers the locals by reporting Laura for benefit fraud and announces it in The Queen Victoria public house. In April 2004, Janine and Laura are seen fighting just before Laura dies after falling down the stairs. It is noted in the post mortem that Laura had recently been in a fight due to bruising, and Janine's skin is found under her nails. Although Janine was with Pat when Laura died, Pat refuses to give Janine an alibi, and brands her "pure evil". In desperation, Janine goes to Paul and offers to sleep with him in return for an alibi, but Paul refuses. She is arrested by the police, charged with Laura's murder, and remanded in custody in May 2004.

Janine stands trial off-screen in December 2005, and Frank tries to persuade Pat to tell the truth in court, giving Janine an alibi. Pat refuses, but a conversation with Laura's mother Edwina Dunn (Gay Hamilton) forces Pat to tell the court what really happened. Janine is released, but leaves Frank outside the courtroom.

=== 2008–2014 ===
In April 2008, Janine returns for Frank's funeral and is angry that he has not left any money for her in his will; she scatters his ashes before departing. In December 2008, Pat and Ricky later discover that Janine is masquerading as a Jewish orphan named Judith Bernstein so that she can marry an elderly Jewish man named David (Harry Towb) for his money. They trace Janine to a synagogue, where, just after Janine and David are married, Pat exposes Janine. David has a heart attack and dies, and a now homeless Janine has no choice but to return to Walford. In 2009, she makes various enemies, among them Jack Branning (Scott Maslen), whom Janine drugs and then restrains so she can gain a taped confession of his past misdemeanours, which she uses as blackmail to gain control of Walford's car lot. Pat and Jack usurp her, reclaiming the business. In April 2009, whilst driving around the square, Janine accidentally knocks down Danielle Jones (Lauren Crace); moments later, Danielle dies, and Janine is left guilt-ridden. Though Janine is cleared of any blame, it causes a rift between her and the Mitchells.

In July 2009, in need of money, Janine teams up with Danielle's grandfather Archie Mitchell (Larry Lamb); they make plans to ruin the Mitchell family by taking The Queen Vic from them. When they manipulate Archie's niece and Ricky's ex-wife Sam Mitchell (Danniella Westbrook) into breaking her bail terms, the Mitchells lose bail surety and face financial ruin. Ian provides the Mitchells with a loan, on condition they use their pub as collateral. Janine has sex with Ian, recording the tryst, then blackmails him, threatening to show his wife Jane Beale (Laurie Brett) unless he sells the Mitchell loan to Archie. Archie subsequently takes control of The Queen Vic when he refuses to allow the Mitchells to meet the terms of the loan. Meanwhile, Janine and her flatmate Ryan Malloy (Neil McDermott), with whom Janine is having sex, plan to fleece Archie. He and Janine announce their engagement, but on Christmas Day 2009, Archie – who has realised Janine is intending to con him – throws her onto the street, leaving her distraught. That same day, Archie is murdered by an unknown assailant (see Who Killed Archie?). Janine becomes a suspect for his murder, though she denies it. While she attempts to frame Ian and the Mitchells for the murder, Peggy attempts to frame her, planting evidence in her flat, which leads to an arrest but no charge. In the end, Janine is cleared and Bradley Branning (Charlie Clements) is held falsely responsible for the murder – although, unknown to everyone, Archie's killer was in fact Bradley's wife Stacey Branning (Lacey Turner) – whom he had previously raped amid his conspiracy with Janine.

In 2010, when Ryan confesses his love for Janine, she recoils, but when he attempts to leave Walford, she admits she loves him too. In September 2010, despite Janine nearly straying on her hen night, she and Ryan marry, but marital happiness is short-lived when Ryan discovers he is the father of Stacey's daughter Lily. In October 2010, a feud erupts between Janine and Stacey when Janine reports her to social services for neglecting Lily. Later, Janine kidnaps Lily, suggesting to Ryan they leave Walford with Lily to separate Ryan from Stacey. Her games push Ryan and Stacey closer together and they begin an affair. Janine later finds out about Stacey's affair with Ryan and she vows to kill them both. She buys sedatives and poisons Ryan. He is left bedridden but manages to escape, and ends their marriage publicly after being released from hospital. In December 2010, hurt and angry, Janine discovers Stacey is Archie's murderer and goes public with this, but is largely ignored with no concrete evidence. Desperate, on Christmas Day 2010, Janine visits Stacey; she stabs herself to try to frame Stacey for her own attempted murder, but Stacey escapes the country before her arrest. Blaming Janine for Stacey's departure, Ryan refuses to reunite with Janine, and attempts to kill her by removing her oxygen tubing when she is hospitalised. She is saved by Ricky's chance arrival, but both Pat and Ricky denounce Janine's actions when she admits her injuries are self-inflicted.

In April 2011, Ricky and Janine receive news that their grandmother Lydia Simmonds (Margaret Tyzack/Heather Chasen) is ill and in need of care. Janine takes Lydia in, with the ulterior motive of inheriting her fortune. Janine learns that Lydia is very similar to herself, and eventually admits she loves Lydia, but Lydia's health quickly deteriorates. Janine discovers Lydia has left all her money to charity, but admits to Lydia that she no longer cares, during a heartfelt conversation. In June 2011, before she dies, Lydia explains that she wanted to look after Janine after her mother died, but Pat and Frank would not allow it. Janine is devastated by Lydia's death, but her family, including Pat, accuse her of killing her. At Ryan's behest, Janine is questioned by police, but released without charge, and in July 2011, Janine is stunned when she inherits Lydia's estate, making her a millionaire. Janine later happily achieves full closure from Ryan after learning that he has fled Walford.

Janine buys various properties and businesses; she starts a property management company and a women's fitness centre with her boyfriend Michael Moon (Steve John Shepherd). She also buys a share in the nightclub R&R, making Phil Mitchell (Steve McFadden) her reluctant partner; both clash over the running of the club. In December 2011, when Pat needs money to pay debts, Janine gives her a loan, insisting Pat use her house as collateral. She later brings the loan payment deadline forward, refusing to believe Pat is dying. On New Year's Day 2012, Janine makes peace with Pat before her death, with Pat convincing a pregnant Janine to keep Michael's child. Janine accepts Michael's marriage proposal after he reluctantly agrees to sign a prenuptial agreement.

When Stacey's mother Jean Slater (Gillian Wright) tells everyone, including Janine, that Michael stole her money and lied to her, Janine refuses to believe Jean's claims and dismisses them because Jean has bipolar disorder. However, in June 2012, Stacey's cousin Kat Moon (Jessie Wallace) returns and demands Janine repay the funds, or she will go to the police. Michael eventually confesses the truth to Janine on her wedding day and offers her an ultimatum: that she rip up the prenuptial agreement or the wedding is off. Janine is torn between the two but eventually agrees to cancel the pre-nup; Janine and Michael marry but she goes into labour 11 weeks early at the wedding reception. At the hospital, Janine undergoes a cesarean and her daughter is put into an incubator, which distresses Janine. The baby is named Scarlett. Janine begins to doubt Michael's intent when he asks to be a signatory on the business accounts and buys a sports car, so orders Billy to change the combination on the office safe. In August 2012, Michael's strange behaviour continues, leaving Janine convinced he is having an affair. She confronts him, offering him a suitcase of money and saying that if he really loves her, he will refuse to take it. Michael is furious and tells Janine that she cannot hope to be a good mother to Scarlett. In September 2012, believing him to be right, Janine packs her bags and hands Scarlett to Michael, taking the money and leaving. Michael is informed that Janine has transferred all the money from her bank accounts and has ordered that her business Butcher's Joints be closed down, transferring all her properties over to another estate agent, leaving Michael with nothing.

Several months later, in April 2013, Janine returns to Walford and visits Michael. Janine tells Michael that she is back for Scarlett, and manipulates Michael into giving her custody of Scarlett, denying him parental access. She then hires Michael's former nanny Alice Branning (Jasmyn Banks) to look after Scarlett; however, Alice is Michael's secret ally. When Janine catches Alice stealing jewellery from her house, Alice explains she is stressed because Michael is putting demands on her to see Scarlett, and she has been letting him do so. Janine agrees that it is better for Scarlett, in the long-run, to have a relationship with both her parents. In June 2013, at Ian's restaurant opening, Janine, as an investor, has the sign and name of the restaurant changed from "Ian Beale @ Le Square" to "Scarlett's". They apparently call a truce, but Janine then leaves in a car with Scarlett, telling Michael that she may never return.

Michael eventually tracks Janine down and she returns to Walford. She employs Danny Pennant (Gary Lucy), who buys a share in Michael's boxing club. Janine has sex with Danny but tells him that it is a one off. She rehires Alice as her nanny, unaware that she is still being manipulated by Michael, but fires her again when she tells Janine that she had sex with Michael. In October 2013, the increasing animosity between Janine and Michael leads to her taking out an injunction against him. Michael then begins a plot to kill Janine, and involves Alice in his plans. Alice has second thoughts and tells Janine of Michael's plans. When Janine confronts Michael, he tries to strangle her, leading to Alice stabbing Michael in the back to stop him. Alice then leaves to answer the door, but realising Michael is still alive, Janine stabs him again in the stomach, killing him. Alice believes she killed him, and Janine tells the police that Alice stabbed Michael twice and also attacked her. In November 2013, Alice's brother, Joey Branning (David Witts), seduces Janine in a bid to extract the truth from her, but fails.

In December 2013, Pat's son David Wicks (Michael French) suspects that Janine is guilty of the murder, so he manipulates her into allowing him to stay at her house, and then into admitting that she killed Michael. David promises to keep her secret, but has secretly recorded the confession on his phone. Meanwhile, Janine is planning to buy The Queen Vic, and sells her share of R&R and her car to do so. On Christmas Day 2013, David then reveals the recording to Janine and blackmails her into giving him the £250,000 she has raised. Janine panics, and tries to kill David by hitting him with a car. However, he suffers only minor injuries. After she hands over the cash, he threatens to call the police anyway. She convinces him to give her a day to get away, but David's girlfriend Carol Jackson (Lindsey Coulson) finds David's phone and plays the confession. She gives the phone to Joey, who calls the police and Janine is arrested for Michael's murder, and is taken away by the police.

In February 2014, Kat and Stacey visit Janine in prison and try to convince her to drop the false statement she made against Stacey four years ago. Janine agrees on the condition that Kat provides her with a false witness testimony to Michael's murder, backing up Janine's story that Alice killed him. In March 2014, at the trial, Kat agrees and does as she is told. However, halfway through the trial, Alice tries to kill herself in her cell and is immediately rushed to hospital. Because of this, Janine admits the truth. The jury later returns with a not guilty verdict for both Alice and Janine. After the trial, Janine returns to Walford one last time and tries to make amends with the locals in The Queen Vic, but everyone, including Carol, is completely hostile towards her, and she is forced to leave the pub. Janine then leaves Walford for Paris to join Diane and Scarlett, and it is hinted that she plans to con a couple who have just won the lottery. Janine's final appearance was on 20 March 2014.

Off-screen in December 2019, Janine sells the house that the Slaters are living in to Kheerat Panesar (Jaz Deol), which leaves them homeless for Christmas.

=== 2021–2026 ===
In August 2021, Scarlett (now Tabitha Byron) contacts Kat's son Tommy Moon (Sonny Kendall) online, under the presumption that he is her cousin. She reveals that she has been in foster care due to Janine's neglect, and is about to be taken into care. She asks Tommy if she can live with him and Kat. In September 2021, Janine is seen impersonating as a doctor, under her former pseudonym "Judith Bernstein", and seduces Zack Hudson (James Farrar). It is hinted that Janine has been impersonating a doctor to persuade social services that she is good enough to look after Scarlett. Janine later returns to Albert Square and confronts Kat, warning her about the lengths she will go to get Scarlett back. Janine attempts to reason with Kat, and reveals that she lost her fortune at some point after her departure from Walford, but this fails when Zack reveals Janine's pseudonym, and her scam as a doctor is uncovered. Kat reveals the truth to social services, and soon Scarlett goes missing. Janine is accused of abducting Scarlett; however, she finds her hiding at the Mitchells' house with Tommy. Janine tries to get Scarlett to return with her, but a scuffle unfolds with Tommy. Whilst trying to retrieve Scarlett, she pulls her cardigan and accidentally throws it onto the open flame of the stove, starting a fire. Tommy locks himself, Scarlett and Janine in his bedroom in an attempt to keep Janine from taking Scarlett. Once they realise the house is on fire, Janine takes control of the situation, and manages to get Scarlett to safety out of the front door of the house, but has to go back for Tommy, who ran into one of the bedrooms in a panic. She lifts Tommy out of a window, but lets go when an explosion caused by the fire knocks her back. Tommy survives and is taken to hospital, and Janine manages to escape when the firefighters arrive. Despite saving Tommy, Kat still goes against Janine in court to get custody of Scarlett and succeeds in doing so. This leads to Janine deciding to remain in Walford to fight for Scarlett. Despite struggling to get a job, she is employed by Frankie Lewis (Rose Ayling-Ellis) at The Queen Vic. However, her former business partner returns, and offers Janine money to continue to impersonate her as a doctor, but Janine turns it down, wanting to prove to Kat and Scarlett that she has changed. Her fling with Zack continues, and they sleep together.

Kat discovers that Janine has told Tommy about Michael, who is also his biological father, and kicks her out. Scarlett then finds out Tommy is actually her older half-brother, and not her cousin. Janine is forced to lodge with Billy, his surrogate son Jay Brown (Jamie Borthwick) and ex-wife and Jay's girlfriend Honey Mitchell (Emma Barton). Janine forces Jay to give her a job at the car lot so that she, Billy and her nephew Liam Butcher (Alfie Deegan) can sell stolen cars to customers and incriminate Jay for car theft. They successfully manage to steal cars and Janine forges Jay's signature on the documents. Jay confronts Janine about the stolen cars and she reveals the truth. Jay decides to join in on the scam, but Janine plants a stolen necklace from one of the stolen cars with Jay's belongings, and calls the police, leading to Jay's arrest. When it is revealed that Janine had orchestrated the scam, she is evicted by Honey. Janine later gets promoted as bar manager at The Queen Vic and becomes close with landlord and Frankie's father Mick Carter (Danny Dyer), much to the annoyance of Mick's mother Shirley Carter (Linda Henry). His other daughter Nancy (Maddy Hill) becomes suspicious of Janine when she moves into The Queen Vic after Honey evicts her. She later plans to seduce Mick, but he rebuffs her advances and orders her to leave, as he plans to rekindle his relationship with his wife Linda (Kellie Bright), who is a recovering alcoholic. Janine interrupts Mick's plans by visiting Linda in her mother Elaine Peacock's (Maria Friedman) pub, pretending her name is Judith Bernstein, and manipulating Linda into drinking again, upsetting Mick.

Janine decides to leave following a dispute with Nancy and moves in with Sonia, as an attempt to gain Mick's attention. When social services decide to investigate Janine, she asks Mick to pretend to be her boyfriend for her meeting with the social worker, to convince them that Scarlett will have a stable home. Mick agrees but is adamant that it is kept hidden from residents. Jay uncovers their plan, and also gives Janine a bad character reference, forcing her to admit that she had lied, ruining her chances of regaining custody of Scarlett. In March 2022, Janine supports Mick when it is revealed that his aunt Tina Carter (Luisa Bradshaw-White) was murdered by Gray Atkins (Toby-Alexander Smith) and buried under the floorboards of the abandoned Argee Bhajee. She uses Mick's grief to her own advantage and tries to help him overcome his bereavement by taking him to a grassland to vent his anger; he then kisses her, but she emotionally blackmails him by rejecting his advances. After this, Janine leaves to stay with her sister Clare in Australia. Janine returns to support Mick during Tina's funeral, unaware that Linda is also there, and recognises her. Linda is furious when she sees Janine comforting Mick and reveals that Janine had encouraged her to leave him, however, nobody believes her. Linda is devastated when Mick decides to pursue a relationship with Janine. Janine is worried when Mick does not want to sleep with her, and when she sees Mick getting close to her adopted step-niece and his former daughter-in-law Whitney Dean (Shona McGarty), she becomes jealous and warns her off. Mick later reveals to Janine that he is struggling to be intimate with women after he was raped as a child by his former social worker, Katy Lewis (Simone Lahbib).

Janine re-gains custody of Scarlett after Scarlett tells Kat that she wants to live with Janine. Janine later becomes jealous when Mick spends time with Linda, and tries to warn Linda away from Mick by taunting her about her alcoholism, causing Linda to continue drinking. Janine's jealousy intensifies, and she offers Linda money to leave Walford. Linda demands more money, which Janine cannot afford, and she resorts to fleecing Zack and Nancy by luring her old associate Melissa (Katharine Bennett-Fox) into posing as an investor for their business. They believe that they are investing in a restaurant; however, Melissa steals their money and shares it with Janine. Janine gives Linda the money, and she agrees to leave, but eventually decides to stay when she realises that she cannot leave her family. Linda realises that Janine has stolen Nancy's money, and tries to tell her, but Nancy storms off after an argument. After Linda's car breaks down, Janine offers to drive them back to Walford, but they argue and Janine loses concentration, causing her to crash into a tree. After believing that Linda is dead, Janine frames her for the accident, and runs to Australia with Scarlett, but returns to visit Linda in hospital to keep up her caring pretense. Linda's friend and Zack's half-sister Sharon Watts (Letitia Dean) plans to tell Mick about Janine stealing Nancy's money, but Janine turns the tables on Sharon after finding out the stolen money is now in the hands of Sam Mitchell (now played by Kim Medcalf), who has used it to purchase the local nightclub from Ruby Allen (Louisa Lytton). Janine taunts Sharon by threatening to report Linda and the Mitchells to the fraud department for money laundering, if Sharon does not pay her back the stolen £50,000, warning Sharon that Linda's alcoholism and Sharon being Phil's ex-wife would lead to the police believing her over Sharon.

Janine continues feeling threatened by Linda's presence in her and Mick's relationship, and has her baby daughter Annie Carter taken away by social services after blackmailing Jada Lennox (Kelsey Calladine-Smith) into hiding empty wine bottles around the house by also threatening to report Jada to social services. This backfires when Mick decides to temporarily look after Annie. Soon after, Janine finds out she is pregnant with Mick's child, and he proposes to her. Janine accepts, although she later falls down the stairs at the tube station. Janine becomes paranoid when she sees Mick with Linda, and suspects that they are having an affair. She lies to Mick, saying their unborn child's life is in danger, but Sonia discovers the truth, and tries to force her to come clean. Janine is furious and lashes out, causing Sonia to call Ricky back to Walford to help her. Janine and Mick marry, despite Shirley's attempts to sabotage the wedding, but Mick begins to have doubts about his feelings for Janine and his love for Linda. On Christmas Day, Jada returns to Walford and tells Sharon that Janine had blackmailed her into calling social services on Linda. They reveal this to Mick and Linda during a Christmas dinner at The Queen Vic, but Janine manages to manipulate Mick and he sends them away. Following a heart to heart with Linda, Scarlett exposes Janine for framing Linda for drink driving. Janine fails to convince Mick and Linda that Scarlett is lying, and Mick throws her out, declaring their marriage is over. When he decides to report Janine to the police, she panics and quietly flees the square in a car after abandoning Scarlett. Janine is chased by Mick and Linda on the way to Dover, and after briefly stopping and attacking Mick, both verbally and physically, she tries to escape in the car. Linda manages to get into the passenger seat and attempts to stop Janine by trying to take the wheel. The car is steered off the road onto the cliffside and the car falls off into the sea. Mick dives in and saves Janine and their unborn child, and goes back in to save Linda, not knowing that Linda has already managed to escape. He becomes lost at sea and is presumed dead. Upon returning to the square, Janine blames Linda for the incident and attempts to evict Linda and Shirley from The Queen Vic, causing Shirley to strangle her. Janine then reveals to Sonia, Ricky and Scarlett that Mick is presumed dead, and tries to manipulate Scarlett into retracting her statement about the original car crash (which Janine faked to indicate that Linda had been drink driving), but Scarlett refuses. Ricky, horrified by Janine's actions, calls the police, and she is arrested for perverting the course of justice.

Off-screen, the following month, Janine agrees for Ricky to have custody of Scarlett, and he takes her to live in Germany with him. In February 2023, she attempts to sell Mick's share of The Queen Vic, causing more distress for Linda in the process. The following month, Linda learns via her solicitor that Janine has pleaded guilty. In May 2023, Linda hears the court has sentenced Janine to five years imprisonment, and in June 2023, Ricky calls The Queen Vic to tell Linda that Janine has given birth to Mick's son in prison.

In November 2026, Linda receives news that Mick’s body has been found after four years. Janine, as Mick’s widow, is his next of kin and has control over his funeral arrangements. She has his death certificate reinstated without the consent of his family, after Mick’s son Lee (Danny Hatchard) had previously had it revoked. Linda and her new partner, Max Branning (Jake Wood), track Janine down to confront her. Janine claims that Mick had in fact been alive and living alone in North London until his death from a heart attack just two weeks earlier. Janine later admits to Max that she is unsure if it is actually Mick’s body in the coffin, and she wants him to be legally dead so she can inherit money from his life insurance, so identified the body as Mick’s regardless. Janine encourages Max to lie to Linda that he had seen the body for himself, after Max’s insecurities that Linda will always love Mick more than him. He does so, leaving Linda and her family devastated.

== Other appearances ==
In November 2021, Janine appeared in a sketch of Channel 4 show First Dates alongside Coronation Street character Steve McDonald (Simon Gregson) and Emmerdale character Eric Pollard (Chris Chittell) in aid of Children in Need. In the sketch, Janine goes on a date with married Steve, who is unaware that he is on a date. Later, it emerges that the real date is actually Eric.

== Reception ==
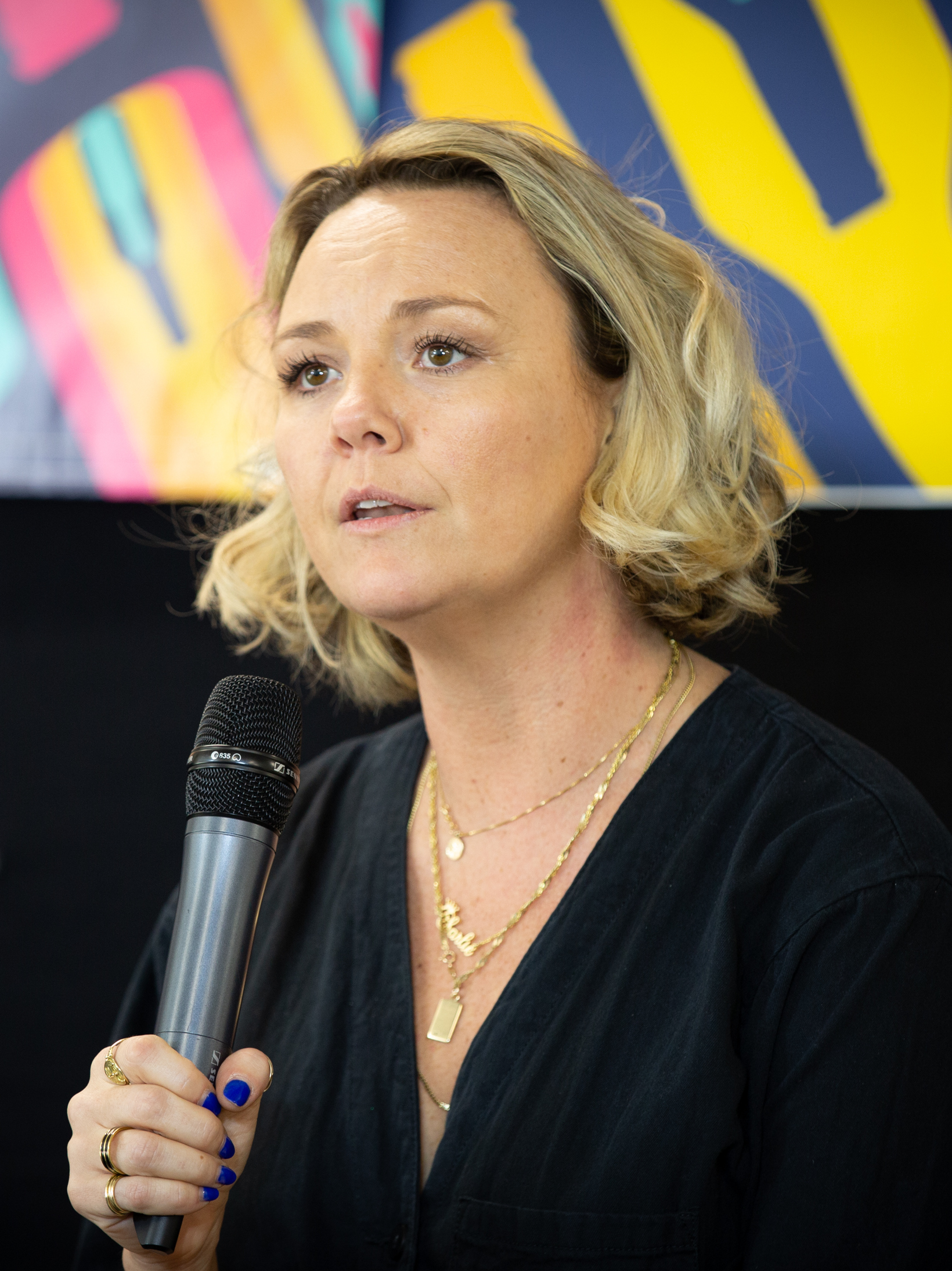
Charlie Brooks (pictured) took over the role of Janine from 1999 and quickly became popular with fans and critics.

Janine has been well received by critics, although some of her storylines have come under criticism. She has been described as "the crazy, evil vixen of Albert Square" and journalist Richard Arnold said of the character, "No matter how bad she gets, we welcome her back to Walford with open arms. Because you wouldn't turn your back on her." Executive producer Bryan Kirkwood deemed Janine "the best bitch on TV", while show writer Tony Jordan called her the "devil" and "evil", but added, "She's cheated, she's lied her way through Albert Square and we still kind of like her."

In 2001, it was reported that education experts blamed delinquent young characters in soap operas, like Janine, for increasing disorder and violence in schools. In 2002, scenes involving the character, when Janine prostituted herself to pay for cocaine that she was about to snort were chastised by Conservative MP Tim Yeo and Liberal Democrat MP Nick Harvey The BBC defended the storyline, saying, "Although the storyline implied Janine had taken drugs, there were no scenes that actually showed her using them. EastEnders has always tackled difficult issues like drug-taking in a responsible way, mindful of its responsibilities to its younger audience."

In 2014, Matt Bramford from What to Watch put Janine's recasting on his list of the 18 best recastings in British and Australian soap operas, commenting, "Charlie Brooks became the clear queen when she joined in 1999". In 2020, Sara Wallis and Ian Hyland from The Daily Mirror placed Janine third on their ranked list of the best EastEnders characters of all time. In February 2025, Radio Times ranked Janine as the 3rd best EastEnders villain, with Laura Denby writing: "Every time she returns to Walford, she gives us a fresh reason to despise her - yet Brooks has always been able to strip back Janine's bravado and showcase her vulnerable side".

=== Awards and nominations ===
Brooks was awarded Best Bitch at the Inside Soap Awards in 2001. In March 2009, Brooks won the Best Bad Girl award at the 2009 All About Soap Bubble Awards, which are voted for by the public, for her portrayal of Janine, with Brooks saying: "I'm thrilled that viewers think I am so good at being bad!" Brooks also won Villain of the Year at The British Soap Awards in 2004 for her portrayal of the same character, and was nominated in the same category in 2011. Brooks won her third Inside Soap Award for "Best Bitch" in 2009. In February 2011, the love triangle storyline between Janine, Ryan and Stacey was nominated in the Best Love Triangle category at the 2011 All About Soap Bubble Awards. She also won the award for Best Bitch at the 2012 Inside Soap Awards. In Digital Spy's 2012 end of year reader poll, Brooks won Best Female Soap Actor with 23.0% of the vote.
