= Ricky Butcher =

Fictional character from EastEnders

- EastEnders character
- Portrayed by: Sid Owen
- Duration: 1988–2000, 2002–2004, 2008–2012, 2022–2023
- First appearance: Episode 341; 12 May 1988
- Last appearance: Episode 6636; 26 January 2023
- Introduced by: Tony Holland (1988); John Yorke (2002); Diederick Santer (2008); Bryan Kirkwood (2012); Chris Clenshaw (2022)
- Spin-off appearances: Pudding Lane (1999); Ricky & Bianca (2002); Last Tango in Walford (2010); EastEnders E20 (2010–2011)
In-universe information
- Other names: Richard Francis Butcher
- Occupation: Mechanic; Taxi driver; Barman
- Father: Frank Butcher
- Mother: June Butcher
- Stepmother: Pat Butcher; Peggy Mitchell
- Sisters: Clare Butcher; Diane Butcher; Janine Butcher
- Half-brothers: Danny
- Wife: Sam Mitchell (1991–1996); Bianca Jackson (1997–2000, 2010–2012)
- Sons: Liam Butcher
- Daughters: Kira Salter; Tiffany Butcher; Natasha Butcher
- Stepsons: Morgan Butcher
- Stepdaughters: Whitney Dean (adoptive)
- Grandfathers: George Butcher
- Grandmothers: Mo Butcher; Lydia Simmonds
- Uncles: Norman Simmonds
- Aunts: Joan Garwood
- Nephews: Jacques Butcher
- Nieces: Scarlett Butcher

Ricky Butcher is a fictional character from the BBC soap opera EastEnders, played by Sid Owen. Introduced as a school boy in 1988, Ricky is one of the longest-running male protagonists to feature in EastEnders. Owen originally left the role in 2000 to pursue a music career. However, he reprised the role in 2002 before being axed by producer Louise Berridge in 2004. In 2008, executive producer Diederick Santer introduced the character for a third time, along with his wife Bianca Jackson (Patsy Palmer). Ricky is portrayed as unintelligent, simplistic, easily led and bossed around by dominant personalities. On 26 February 2011, it was announced that Owen would take a temporary break from the show. The character exited on 19 July 2011, returning five months later on 13 December 2011. Ricky left EastEnders on 17 January 2012. Ricky returned to EastEnders on 20 June 2012 for the wedding of his sister Janine Butcher (Charlie Brooks) before departing for the final time on 29 June 2012. In April 2016 he had voiced his interest in returning to EastEnders during an appearance on Celebrity Juice. He reprised his role as Ricky for an eight-week stint to tie in with Janine's departure. Ricky was onscreen from 1 December 2022 to 26 January 2023.

== Creation and development ==
=== Background ===
EastEnders had been on air for three years before the character of Ricky made his first screen appearance in May 1988. At the time, big changes were occurring "behind-the-scenes". Co-creator Julia Smith took "a more back-seat role" as Series Producer, which allowed producer Mike Gibbon to take control of the making of the programme.

The arrival of the Butcher family in May 1988 signified an end of an era for the soap, as Den and Angie Watts vacated their positions as landlord and landlady of The Queen Victoria public house, leaving the head of the Butcher family, Frank (Mike Reid), and his girlfriend Pat Wicks (Pam St. Clement) to take over. Along with Frank came his two teenage children, Ricky (Sid Owen) and Diane (Sophie Lawrence). Later they were joined by Frank's mother Mo (Edna Doré), and Frank's youngest daughter Janine (Rebecca Michael). Owen was 16 when he first appeared as Ricky in EastEnders.

=== Personality ===
Portrayed as a soft touch and unintellectual, the character has been dubbed "thicky Ricky" by the popular press in the UK — in the serial he failed all his GCSEs. Sid Owen has discussed Ricky's intellect: "Ricky is just a sort of lovable innocent, really. He's just bungling his way through life the best way he can. All right, so he'll never win any prizes for his brain power. So what? He's a good bloke, a good mate to his friends and he can work miracles with motors [...] What you see is what you get where he's concerned."

Author Kate Lock has described Ricky as hapless and a figure of fun, "completely lacking in tact and rarely opens his mouth without putting his foot in it." Noting the changes his character went through in 2000, Owen said, "[Ricky] grew up over the years just as all of us have to change. He became more sensitive and more mature."

=== Marriage to Sam Mitchell ===
During the early 1990s, Ricky's narrative concentrated upon his teen elopement to Sam Mitchell (Danniella Westbrook). Westbrook has said that "the public couldn't get enough of the simmering relationship between Ricky and Sam and the show was inundated with calls from the press [...] [Sam and Ricky] were involved in a plotline about under-age sex, so the press swooped in on that."

To the anger of her family, Sam persuaded Ricky to elope to Gretna Green in July 1991. The week's worth of episodes focusing on their marriage were filmed on-location and have been described by former EastEnders scriptwriter, Colin Brake, as a "farce-like chase round the country". Written by Debbie Cook, the storyline saw Ricky and Sam's families, including Sam's mother Peggy (Jo Warne; introduced specifically for this plotline) attempting to stop the couple from saying "I do". The storyline climaxed in the registry office wedding, but despite the Scottish setting, the recording of the episodes took place in Hertfordshire. Later in the month, Sam and Ricky had a more official "grand church blessing" with all their family in attendance. The Butchers' blessing was screened in the same episode as the funeral of another character, Charlie Cotton.

The marriage was portrayed as problematic, fraught with interference from their families, lack of money, and Ricky's jealousy of Sam's partying and her modeling career, including a topless photoshoot. In 1993 Westbrook left the soap. On-screen, Sam's marriage to Ricky ended following an affair with a yuppie named Clive (Sean Gallagher).

=== Marriage to Bianca Jackson ===
Ricky's relationship with Bianca Jackson (Patsy Palmer) has been central to his narrative; their affiliation began in 1994. Palmer and Owen already knew each other before working together on the soap, as both attended the Anna Scher theatre school. Owen has said, "We practically grew up together. We'd known each other for years. It was weird when she started on the show and we began playing the 'Ricky & Bianca Get To Know Each Other' bit. I had already spent a lot of time with Patsy. I think we were both seven when we met."

The dynamics of their relationship were clear from the start, with Bianca portrayed as the dominant, bossy and authoritative partner, while Ricky was shown as the hen-pecked, dim-witted "loser" or "soft touch", comically under the thumb of his female counterpart. James Rampton from The Independent has commented, "to her eternally put-upon husband, Ricky, Bianca was a ferocious reincarnation of H Rider Haggard's 'She Who Must Be Obeyed'." Bianca was notorious for shouting the catchphrase "Rickaaaaaaay!" (a cockney pronunciation of Ricky) at her lover. It has been suggested that Bianca's catchphrase — "Rickaaaaaaay!" — transitioned, becoming "shorthand for any sort of heinous henpecking."

One of the first notable storylines featuring the couple occurred in 1995, when Ricky embarked on an affair with Bianca's "put-upon sidekick", Natalie Price (Lucy Speed). On-screen Natalie and Ricky found themselves sidelined and bullied by Bianca, forcing them together and leading to their eventual affair, which continued for several weeks on-screen, with Ricky seeing both Natalie and Bianca. The storyline reached its climax on 21 February 1995; 17.0 million viewers tuned in to witness Bianca discovering that her boyfriend was sleeping with her best friend. The characters were shown to reconcile later in the year when Ricky supported Bianca through a personal crisis — the revelation that she had unknowingly tried to seduce her estranged father David Wicks (Michael French).

Various crises between the characters were featured over the following years, causing them to break up and reconcile numerous times. In the book Seeing Things: Television in the Age of Uncertainty, author John Ellis uses the couple's combustible relationship as an example of emotional intensity and pathos: "A couple like Ricky and Bianca...can have constantly sniped at each other for several episodes, for no apparent dramatic purpose except that it is the nature of their relationship. Then they will suddenly be confronted by a life-changing decision...There is suddenly a shift in emotional intensity for the audience. Every word now counts, and all the previous audience attitudes of irritation or even condescension to this 'not very bright couple'...become a feeling of utter absorption in their dilemma." The BBC has reported that Bianca and Ricky's on-off romance "captivated millions of fans", and in April 1997 22 million viewers tuned in to see them marry on-screen, one of the biggest soap audiences ever. In 2000, Owen stated that the storyline he most enjoyed in EastEnders was the build up and marriage to Bianca, because "the public's enthusiasm for the event was a great motivation". The couple have been described as "iconic".

In 1997, the couple were featured in a storyline about spina bifida and hydrocephalus, a developmental birth defect resulting in an incompletely formed spinal cord of the baby. After falling pregnant with Ricky's baby, a pre-natal scan revealed that her unborn foetus had the conditions. In the storyline, Bianca and Ricky agonised about whether to have an abortion, but eventually decided to terminate the pregnancy at 20 weeks, following the diagnosis. In scenes shown after the abortion, Bianca and Ricky were given the chance to see and hold their dead daughter, named Natasha, after the birth (Ricky was unable to do this, though Bianca later said her baby had been "perfect"), and a period of heavy grief followed as the characters came to terms with what they had done. The Peterborough-based Association for Spina Bifida and Hydrocephalus (ASBAH) helped and provided information to the programme makers during the storyline. Despite the birth of a premature but healthy baby, Liam, in an episode that aired on Christmas Day 1998, the following year the couple split following Bianca's affair, Palmer having decided to leave EastEnders.

=== Departure (2000) ===
In September 1999, it was announced that actor Sid Owen would be quitting his role as Ricky Butcher, after 12 years on-screen; his decision to leave was announced two weeks after Patsy Palmer's departing episode aired. Ricky was not killed off in the serial, as the producers opted to give the actor an open-ended storyline, enabling him to return. An EastEnders' spokesperson claimed that "Owen's decision to take a break from filming had been reached in mutual agreement with EastEnders' bosses". Owen stated, "I love playing Ricky Butcher but it will be good to take off his overalls for a while. After 12 years, two failed marriages and two children, I'm looking forward to some time off - but also my return to Walford." Executive producer at the time, Matthew Robinson, said, "Viewers have come to love the character of Ricky Butcher due to Sid's wonderful acting. We wish Sid luck in any forthcoming projects and look forward to welcoming Ricky back to EastEnders in due course."

Penned scripts for Ricky's exit in April 2000 had to be rewritten to account for the absence of Mike Reid who played Ricky's father Frank. The storyline initially planned to have Frank and Ricky involved in one of EastEnders renowned two-hander episodes, but due to Reid's off-screen ill-health, Steve McFadden, who plays Phil Mitchell, had to stand in for the episode, which saw Ricky flee Walford. Of his departing episode, Owen stated that he was pleased Ricky's final scenes featured just him and Phil (Steve McFadden). He comments, "both Phil and Ricky have had babies, broken marriages and loads of ups and downs in their lives, and it was good to talk about it all in that episode. It's a brilliant script [...] I burst out crying, really sobbing".

=== Reintroduction and axing (2002–2004) ===
In 2001, the BBC announced that Patsy Palmer and Sid Owen were reprising their roles as Bianca and Ricky, for a special spin-off, entitled EastEnders: Ricky & Bianca. Filmed in Manchester in January 2002, the two part, hour-long special reunited the characters for the first time in over two years. The spin-off or 'soap bubble' was part of Mal Young's (BBC's controller of drama serials) plan to expand the EastEnders brand — he created a "bubbles unit" to make, at most, six one-off specials a year. EastEnders: Ricky & Bianca aired in May 2002, and proved a ratings winner, with more than 10 million viewers tuning in.

In the spin-off, Bianca had fallen upon hard times, and accidentally got a visiting Ricky embroiled in a drugs heist. Despite talk of reconciling, Bianca opted to leave Ricky behind once again, leaving Liam in his care. The spin-off brought in various characters unrelated to the main serial, including Vince, Bianca's drug dealing boss played by Craig Charles, and Ricky's fiancée Cassie, played by Sally Ann Triplett.

The spin-off paved the way for Ricky to return to EastEnders as a regular character in 2002, without Bianca. The most notable storyline featuring the character during this period was a second affair with Natalie Evans (Lucy Speed), breaking up her marriage to Barry Evans (Shaun Williamson). In a plot twist, this affair ended in disaster when Ricky was caught having a one-night stand with his ex-wife Sam (Kim Medcalf).

In October 2003, a year after the character had returned, the BBC announced that they were axing the character of Ricky due to "limited possibilities". Executive producer Louise Berridge said, "one of our most enduringly successful characters. We will be very sorry to say goodbye to Sid, who has been one of the most amiable and popular of our cast members since his return to the show [...] the door is being left firmly open for his return in the future." Owen said, "I have enjoyed my time back on the show but now it is time to see a bit more of the world and spend time on my other projects."

The character was written out in scenes that aired in February 2004, Owen being one of many actors to quit or be axed by Louise Berridge that year.

=== Reintroduction and departure (2008–2012) ===
It was announced on 29 October 2007 that Patsy Palmer would be reprising the role of Bianca in EastEnders. A day later, it was announced that Sid Owen would also be returning to the show as Ricky. Owen commented: "It will be interesting to see what has been happening to Ricky and Bianca over the last few years. Although I must admit I'm not looking forward to her nagging me by shouting his name." Executive producer Diederick Santer commented: "First Patsy comes home, now Sid! Ricky and Bianca were a hugely popular and well-loved partnership on the show [...] Seeing Bianca back on the show is exciting in itself, but to throw Ricky into the equation gives things an added dimension. Ricky's a great and much-loved character in his own right, but what's really exciting to me is the two of them together. There's so much history, drama and passion to explore [...] There'll always be a connection between Ricky and Bianca". To promote the characters' return, the BBC began airing trailers across the BBC network in March 2008. One trailer utilised Bianca's "trademark holler" of Ricky's name, which is so loud that it smashes the windows of The Queen Victoria public house. The trailer featured the Righteous Brothers' song "Hung on You".

Ricky's return in March 2008 was scripted to coincide with the funeral of his father Frank, following his actor Mike Reid's death in 2007. The episodes, dubbed Frank week, reunited various former cast members on-screen for the event, including actors Sophie Lawrence and Charlie Brooks, who returned as Frank's daughters Diane and Janine respectively. Simultaneously, the plight of Bianca and her children was aired, documenting her permanent return to EastEnders and subsequently leading to Ricky's permanent return, as he moved back to be near his son Liam.

Bianca and Ricky married for the second time in February 2010, during the week of the show's 25th anniversary. Santer explained that he wanted great stories to get people talking, saying "That's [...] why we're doing the soap wedding of the year — and perhaps the soap wedding of the decade — with Ricky and Bianca. The romance played against the thriller story is a great balance, which I hope the audience will be both gripped by and satisfied with."

On 26 February 2011, it was announced Owen will take a break from EastEnders until the end of 2011, to focus on charity work. He departed on 19 July 2011, returning for a brief stint on 13 December 2011 before leaving again on 17 January 2012. Owen's character returned once again in June 2012.

=== Return (2022) ===
In August 2022, it was confirmed that Owen would return to filming the following month in scenes with Charlie Brooks and Kim Medcalf.

== Storylines ==
=== 1988–2000 ===
A teenage Ricky arrives in Albert Square when his father Frank Butcher (Mike Reid) becomes landlord of The Queen Victoria public house in May 1988. Non-academic, Ricky proves to be a troublesome teenager and is frequently berated by his father. He begins dating Shireen Karim (Nisha Kapur), an Asian Muslim, much to Shireen's father Ashraf's (Tony Wredden) disgust. Ashraf forces Shireen into an arranged marriage, prompting Ricky to retaliate by terrorizing Ashraf for a while with a gang of racists.

Later on, Ricky shows talent mending cars, so the Mitchell brothers, Phil (Steve McFadden) and Grant (Ross Kemp), take him on at their auto repair shop as an apprentice mechanic in 1990. Ricky begins dating the Mitchell brothers' younger sister Sam (Danniella Westbrook) and when she decides she wants to get married at 16, she and Ricky elope to Gretna Green in 1991. Their marriage is short-lived, as Sam grows bored and starts to look for entertainment elsewhere; she leaves Ricky in 1993.

Ricky as he appeared in 1996.

Despite a one-night stand with Mandy Salter (Nicola Stapleton) in January 1994, Ricky does not enter into another serious relationship until August, when he begins dating Bianca Jackson (Patsy Palmer). They move in together, but when Bianca begins to treat Ricky badly, he begins an affair with her best friend Natalie Price (Lucy Speed), in 1995. Natalie falls in love with Ricky and sets it up so that Bianca catches them kissing. Furious, Bianca finishes with Ricky, cutting up all his clothes and, after Ricky rejects Natalie, she flees Walford. Bianca eventually forgives Ricky and they reunite. Bianca strays with Lenny Wallace (Des Coleman), but immediately realises her mistake and marries Ricky on 17 April 1997. Later that year Bianca falls pregnant, but a prenatal scan reveals her unborn baby has both spina bifida and hydrocephalus; the Butchers decide to terminate the pregnancy. The trauma devastates them both, but it does bring them closer and in September 1998 Bianca discovers she has fallen pregnant again, resulting in her prematurely giving birth to their son Liam on Christmas Day 1998. The following year, Ricky becomes acquainted with Bianca's mother Carol Jackson (Lindsey Coulson) and her boyfriend Dan Sullivan (Craig Fairbrass). He quickly gets along with the pair, but this changes when Carol tells him that Bianca and Dan have embarked on an affair - as the pair had previously had a relationship in Spain, prior to Dan falling in love with Carol. When the affair becomes public knowledge, the Butchers' marriage ends and Bianca departs with Liam for Manchester. Ricky, devastated by his marriage breakdown, begins to clash with Dan when the latter taunts him - as well as becoming unhappy with his own life and work. This escalates when Ricky learns that Phil has recently befriended Dan, who later tells Ricky that Phil and Roy Evans (Tony Caunter) have been working together on a motor scam. In response, Ricky confronts Phil and the two have an argument as Ricky attempts to leave Walford. Phil apologises to Ricky for hurting him and promises that he'll deal with Dan for him. Ricky initially agrees to return to Walford, but secretly leaves without Phil's consent.

=== "Ricky & Bianca" ===
In May 2002, Ricky arrives to Bianca’s flat in Manchester to visit Liam alongside his fiancée - Cassie. He discovers that Bianca has stolen £50,000 of drug money from her boss, Vince. An unimpressed Ricky convinces Bianca to return the money before she gets hurt. Vince sends the pair to a drug deal which is a set up. Ricky and Bianca escape to a hotel where they briefly rekindle their romance. Bianca reveals that she is struggling as a single parent and is manipulated by Cassie into believing that Ricky's life would be ruined if Bianca returns to him. Bianca decides to leave Liam with Ricky and hitches a ride to a destination unknown.

=== 2002–2004 ===
Ricky returns to Walford in August 2002 with Liam after hearing from his former stepmother Pat Evans (Pam St Clement), that his sister Janine Butcher (Charlie Brooks) has resorted to prostitution and drug abuse by Billy Mitchell (Perry Fenwick). Ricky remains in the square to help Janine and returns to his old job as a mechanic at the Arches. He begins a second affair with Natalie, which ruins her marriage to Roy's son Barry (Shaun Williamson). By then, Roy and Pat have formed a marriage together. Roy soon passes away after suffering a fatal heart attack amid learning about the affair and that Pat had kept it secret at the time she found out about it herself.

Ricky and Natalie subsequently plan to leave Walford together in 2003, but when Janine spitefully informs Natalie about Ricky's one-night stand with his ex-wife Sam (now played by Kim Medcalf), an outraged Natalie dumps him. Janine goes on to marry Barry for his money and kills him during an argument on a cliff. Discovering his sister's role in Barry's death, Ricky disowns Janine and leaves Walford again in February 2004 - horrified and ashamed.

=== 2008–2012 ===
On 31 March 2008, Ricky returns to Walford unexpectedly with his sister Diane Butcher (Sophie Lawrence) to inform Pat that Frank has died. Frank is cremated in Walford the following day. Ricky's fiancée Melinda (Siobhan Hayes) attends, but soon finishes with Ricky when she discovers he is penniless. The Butcher siblings and Pat scatter Frank's ashes in Albert Square gardens after the reading of his will. Ricky returns the following week when he discovers Bianca and Liam are living with Pat after being made homeless. Despite initial hostilities, Ricky helps Bianca regain custody of her four children, who have been put into care, and then decides to remain in Walford himself, to be near Liam. Ricky hopes for a reconciliation with Bianca, but she is involved with Tony King (Chris Coghill), and when Tony is released from prison later that year, he moves in with the Butchers. Unbeknown to the rest of the family, Tony is a paedophile and is having a secret relationship with Bianca's stepdaughter Whitney Dean (Shona McGarty). When this is uncovered, Bianca finishes with Tony and he is imprisoned. Bianca reveals that her youngest daughter, Tiffany (Maisie Smith), could actually be the daughter of Ricky, conceived on their one-night stand in 2002. This is confirmed when Ricky takes a paternity test.

Phil orders Ricky to locate Sam (played by Danniella Westbrook again) in Brazil and he brings her home with him. When Bianca is about to admit her love for him, Ricky reveals that he loves Sam. Ricky and Sam get engaged. However, Sam embarks on an affair with Jack Branning (Scott Maslen) and when Bianca discovers this, she tells Ricky and the engagement is called off. Bianca surprises Ricky by proposing and they marry for a second time in February 2010. Six months later, Ricky discovers Sam is pregnant and due to give birth to a boy. It is unknown whether Ricky or Jack fathered Sam's baby. To Bianca's chagrin, Sam smugly names Ricky as the father and decides to call the baby Richard, after Ricky, but a paternity test reveals she is lying and the baby is Jack's.

When Bianca is jailed for attacking Connor Stanley (Arinze Kene) in 2011, Ricky struggles to support his children, so he accepts a job in Dubai where he is arrested for indecency after being caught swimming naked in the sea. He is fined and deported, leaving him with no money upon his return to Walford. From prison, Bianca blames her family's money problems on Ricky, and Ricky seeks comfort from Mandy who has returned to Walford. After reliving their youth and taking drugs, Ricky and Mandy have sex again. Later, Mandy confesses that their one-night stand in 1994 left her pregnant, but their baby daughter, Kira, died shortly after birth. Ricky immediately regrets having sex with Mandy and decides not to tell Bianca upon her release from prison; however, Bianca discovers the truth on New Year's Day 2012, the same night the Butchers are left distraught by Pat's death from pancreatic cancer. Following Pat's funeral, Bianca realises she cannot forgive Ricky's latest infidelity; she ends their marriage, forcing Ricky to leave Walford. He returns in June for Janine's wedding to Michael Moon (Steve John Shepherd), along with Tiffany, Morgan and Diane. Janine goes into premature labour and Ricky sits with his newborn niece, Scarlett Moon (Amelie), as she fights for survival. Later, he argues with Morgan's biological father, Ray Dixon (Chucky Venn), about their parenting methods, but they call a truce. He becomes Scarlett's godfather at her baptism, along with Whitney as her godmother, before leaving with the children again.

=== 2022–2023 ===
Ricky returns to Walford in December 2022 when Bianca's half-sister Sonia Fowler (Natalie Cassidy) calls him after becoming concerned about Janine's mental state. He is later reunited with Sam (played by Kim Medcalf again). He bonds with Janine's fiancé Mick Carter (Danny Dyer) and reassures Janine that Mick loves her after she suspects that he is having an affair with his ex-wife, Linda (Kellie Bright). Ricky redevelops feelings for Sam but she is not interested in another romance. Mick persuades her to give Ricky a chance and they go on a date and later attend Mick and Janine's wedding together. On Christmas Day, Janine is exposed for blackmailing Jada Lennox (Kelsey Calladine-Smith) into planting empty wine bottles around Linda's house, knowing she is a recovering-alcoholic, and subsequently leading to her temporarily losing custody of her infant daughter Annie Carter, with Scarlett (now Tabitha Byron) also revealing that Janine had previously framed Linda for drink-driving. Janine flees Walford when Linda threatens to call the police, abandoning Scarlett with Ricky and Sonia. She later returns after a car chase leads to Janine and Linda driving off a cliff and crashing into the sea, and Mick being presumed dead after rescuing them. Janine later tries to manipulate Scarlett into retracting her statement about the previous car accident with Linda. Disgusted by Janine's actions, Ricky calls the police himself, leading to her arrest. Ricky and Sam go on another date on New Year's Eve, and Ricky asks Sam to move to Germany with him once he secures sole-custody of Scarlett, but she does not respond immediately. Sam later abandons Ricky when she receives a text from Phil, inviting her to join him and the rest of the family in Peggy's bar to welcome in the New Year, leaving Ricky disappointed.

The next day, Sam apologises to Ricky and agrees to move to Germany with him and Scarlett. Ricky proposes to Sam in the middle of Albert Square, but she rejects his proposal, admitting that she is not interested in marriage again. Sam later tells Ricky that she cannot move abroad with him because her 12-year-old son, Ricky Jnr (Frankie Day), is about to become a father and needs her support. Ricky then bids farewell to Sam and Sonia before departing for Germany with Scarlett.

== Reception ==
In 2006, Ricky Butcher was voted as the UK's favourite soap opera car mechanic in a poll of 500 people organised by car hire firm, Lingscar. 36% voted for Ricky above Kevin Webster from Coronation Street (Michael Le Vell) who scored 34%; EastEnders' Phil Mitchell (Steve McFadden) with 12%, and Kylie Minogue's Charlene Robinson from Neighbours with 7%.

In 2008, when it was announced that both Ricky and Bianca were being reintroduced, executive producer Diederick Santer described them as "a hugely popular and well-loved partnership on the show". Other media sources branded them two of "the most popular characters on the soap" and an "iconic couple". However, Hazel Davis of The Guardian was critical about their reintroduction. She commented, "It's a no-brainer on the show's part. Last year, ratings for EastEnders were at an all-time low. But, just for once, wouldn't it be nice if a soap opera actually introduced new characters with verve and staying power rather than digging up the oldies?". Conversely, Mark Wright from The Stage said that the decision to bring these much-loved characters back "is very welcome". He comments, "Previous returns have been all about the numbers and not about the story, which is the cardinal sin in this game. While there is, of course, the resultant publicity that comes with any new or returning soap character being announced, the storyline possibilities for Ricky and Bianca arriving back in the Square are good. Bianca is turning up with a brood of kids in tow, all belonging to different fathers (how many of them can we expect to see over the next couple of years?). Like it! Ricky arrives with a glamorous WAG [...] on his arm. [...] I sense friction along the way, especially when Ricky realises he never got over Bianca (how could he?). All very well thought through and positive. This sounds like a soap getting back in touch with its roots.".

In 2009, Ruth Deller of entertainment website lowculture.co.uk, who runs a monthly feature of the most popular and unpopular soap opera characters, profiled Ricky praising his new family dynamic, stating: "Who would have ever thought 'thicky Ricky' would have made a best characters list? The return of the Jackson/Butcher/King clan has been very welcome, and Ricky's turn as a doting dad figure has actually proved remarkably touching."
