= Marked Personal =

1973 British television series

Marked Personal is a British daytime television drama created by Charles Dennis and starring Stephanie Beacham and Heather Chasen. The series was made by Thames Television and consisted of 90 episodes, shown twice weekly on Tuesday and Wednesday afternoons during 1973–74. It is set in the fictional personnel department of a large company called B.Y.A., a large industrial concern. Beacham was replaced by Sheila Scott-Wilkenson playing Lynda Carpenter in later episodes.

The programme's theme tune was composed by Ronald Cass with actress Stacey Gregg.

== Cast ==
- Stephanie Beacham as Georgina Layton
- Heather Chasen as Isabel Neal
- Frankie Jordan as Mary Parrish
- Carl Rigg as Gordon Marsh
- Malcolm Reynolds as Steve Mitchell
- Sheila Scott-Wilkenson as Lynda Carpenter
- Maggie Wells as Maggie
- John Lee as Richard Mason
- Rupert Davies as Dr. Jack Morrison
- John Paul as Gerald Painter
- Peter Clay as Phil Davies
- Lloyd Lamble as Geoffrey Bannock
- Glyn Owen as Security Chief Nolan
- Caroline Mortimer as Louise Marsh
- Lewis Collins – Len Thomas
- Trevor T. Smith – Stan Price
