= Margaret Tyzack =

British actress (1931–2011)

Margaret Tyzack CBE
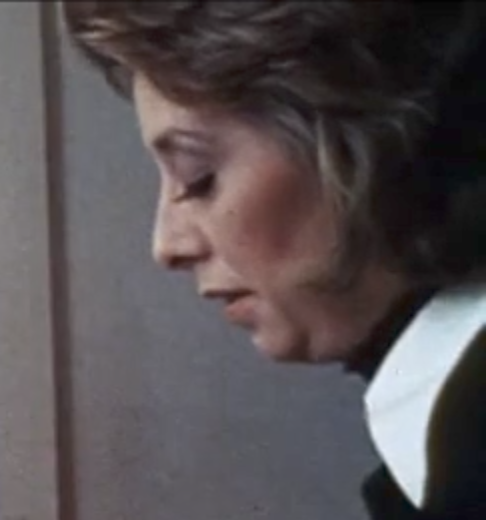
- Tyzack in the trailer for A Clockwork Orange (1971)
- Born: Margaret Maud Tyzack; 9 September 1931; West Ham, Essex, England
- Died: 25 June 2011 (aged 79); Blackheath, London, England
- Education: St Angela's Ursuline School; Royal Academy of Dramatic Art
- Occupation: Actress
- Years active: 1956–2011
- Spouse: Alan Stephenson (m. 1958)
- Children: 1

Margaret Maud Tyzack (9 September 1931 – 25 June 2011) was an English actress. Her television roles included The Forsyte Saga (1967) I, Claudius (1976), George Lucas's Young Indiana Jones (1992–1993) and EastEnders (2011). She won the 1970 BAFTA TV Award for Best Actress for the BBC serial The First Churchills, and the 1990 Tony Award for Best Featured Actress in a Play for Lettice and Lovage, opposite Maggie Smith. She also won two Olivier Awards—in 1981 as Actress of the Year in a Revival and in 2009 as Best Actress in a Play. Her film appearances included Stanley Kubrick's 2001: A Space Odyssey (1968) and A Clockwork Orange (1971), as well as Prick Up Your Ears (1987) and Match Point (2005).

== Early life ==
Tyzack was born in Essex, England, the daughter of Doris (née Moseley) and Thomas Edward Tyzack. She grew up in Plaistow, West Ham (now Greater London). She attended the all-girls' St Angela's Ursuline School, Newham, and was a graduate of RADA.

== Career ==
Tyzack was noted for her classical stage roles, having joined the Royal Shakespeare Company to play Vassilissa in Maxim Gorky's The Lower Depths in 1962, and had major roles in their 1972 Roman Season as Volumnia in Coriolanus, Portia in Julius Caesar and Tamora in Titus Andronicus. She appeared in another Gorky play, as Maria Lvovna in Summerfolk RSC 1974. In 1977 she joined the acting company of the Stratford Festival in Canada, where she played Mrs Alving in Ibsen's Ghosts, Queen Margaret in Richard III and the Countess of Roussillon in All's Well That Ends Well. In a feature of Stratford's 1977 season, New York Times writer Richard Eder noted "One of the main excitements was the discovery of Margaret Tyzack [...] her work here has been a revelation". Tyzack had been engaged on short notice by the Festival when Canadian actress Kate Reid dropped out, which initially spurred some protests from Canadian nationalists. Theatre critic Robert Cushman later wrote that had the protests succeeded "Canadian audiences would have been deprived of three great performances", noting of her performance in Richard III, "there can never have been a better (Queen) Margaret". She played the Countess role again for the Royal Shakespeare Company on Broadway in 1983.

She received her first Olivier award as Actress of the Year in a Revival in 1981 for the National Theatre revival of Who's Afraid of Virginia Woolf? in which she played Martha, replacing Joan Plowright who was ill. In 1990, she won the Tony Award for Best Featured Actress in a Play for her role as Lotte Schoen in the play Lettice and Lovage, in which she appeared in both the London and Broadway productions opposite Dame Maggie Smith. The American Actors' Equity initially refused permission for Tyzack to join the New York production, but Smith refused to appear without Tyzack because of the "onstage chemistry" she believed the two women had created in their roles. In 1994, she played Sybil Birling in the Royal National Theatre production of An Inspector Calls. In 2008, she was acclaimed for her portrayal of Mrs St Maugham in a revival of Enid Bagnold's The Chalk Garden at the Donmar Warehouse, London, for which she won the Best Actress award in the Critics' Circle Theatre Awards and the Olivier award for Best Actress in a Play in 2009. In 2009, she also appeared alongside Helen Mirren in Phedre at the Royal National Theatre.

She appeared in two films directed by Stanley Kubrick, 2001: A Space Odyssey (1968) and A Clockwork Orange (1971). Tyzack also appeared in Ring of Spies (1964), The Whisperers (1967), A Touch of Love (1969), The Legacy (1978), The Quatermass Conclusion (1979), Mr. Love (1985), Prick Up Your Ears (1987), The King's Whore (1990), Mrs Dalloway (1997), Bright Young Things (2003), and the Woody Allen films Match Point (2005) and Scoop (2006).

It was as a television actress that Tyzack became a household name. She is remembered for her leading roles in BBC television productions. She came to notice as Winifred, Soames's sister, in the well received BBC adaptation of Galsworthy's The Forsyte Saga in 1967, a series shown internationally. She portrayed the character of Gladys King in Dennis Potter's The Bone Grinder (1968), a metaphor for the decline of the British Empire and rise of American power in the post-war world. Tyzack played Queen Anne in The First Churchills; Bette in Cousin Bette; and Antonia, mother of the Emperor Claudius, in I, Claudius. She also played Clotilde Bradbury-Scott in the BBC adaptation of the Agatha Christie story Nemesis in 1987 in Miss Marple.

In the 1990s, she played a major role in George Lucas's Young Indiana Jones television series as the young Indiana Jones' strict Oxford-educated tutor, Miss Helen Seymour. In the 2000s, she made two appearances in Midsomer Murders. In 2011, she joined the cast of soap opera EastEnders, playing Lydia Simmonds, the grandmother of Janine Butcher (Charlie Brooks). On 13 April 2011, it was announced that for personal reasons she had departed EastEnders and that her role had been recast to Heather Chasen as a result of the nature of the large storyline needing to continue.

== Honours ==
Tyzack was appointed Officer of the Order of the British Empire (OBE) in the 1970 Birthday Honours and Commander of the Order of the British Empire (CBE) in the 2010 New Year Honours, both for services to drama.

== Personal life ==
Tyzack married mathematician Alan Stephenson in 1958 and together they had one son, Matthew. Tyzack died on 25 June 2011, at the age of 79, from cancer.

== Filmography ==
Year	Title	Role	Notes
1958	Behind the Mask	Night Sister	
1958	Passport to Shame	June, Heath's secretary	
1960	Let's Get Married	Staff Nurse	
1961	Highway to Battle	Hilda	
1964	Ring of Spies	Elizabeth Gee	
1967	The Whisperers	Hospital Almoner	
1968	2001: A Space Odyssey	Elena	
1969	A Touch of Love	Sister Bennett	
1971	A Clockwork Orange	Conspirator Rubinstein	
1978	The Legacy	Nurse Adams	
1979	The Quatermass Conclusion	Annie Morgan	
1983	The Wars	Lady Emmeline	
1986	Mr. Love	Pink Lady	
1987	Prick Up Your Ears	Madame Lambert	
1990	The King's Whore	La Comtesse douairière	
1997	Mrs Dalloway	Lady Bruton	
2002	Until Death	Dorothy Sutton	
2003	Bright Young Things	Lady Throbbing	
2005	Match Point	Mrs. Betty Eastby	
2005	The Thief Lord	Head Nun	Uncredited
2006	Scoop	Sid's Co-Passengers	
2009	National Theatre Live: Phèdre	Oenone	
2011	Mother's Milk	Eleanor Melrose	(final film role)

== Television ==
Year	Title	Role	Notes
1957	Kenilworth	Janet	4 episodes
1957–1958	Angel Pavement	Miss Matfield	4 episodes
1958	Armchair Theatre	Elizabeth Farrow	Episode: "The Owl Who Came Back"
1958–1959	Saturday Playhouse	Nadine Arne/Clare Cousins	2 episodes
1958–1965	ITV Play of the Week	Various	3 episodes
1959	The Infamous John Friend	Mrs. Friend	5 episodes
1960	The Four Just Men	Wife	Episode: "The Miracle of St. Philipe"
1960–1963	BBC Sunday-Night Play	Various	3 episodes
1960–1963	ITV Television Playhouse	Elizabeth/Lily	3 episodes
1961	Theatre 70	Valerie Marsden/The Woman	2 episodes
1961–1962	Drama 61-67	Various	3 episodes
1963	Maigret	Mademoisselle/Anna	2 episodes
1965	Thursday Theatre	Isobel Cherry	Episode: "The Floweing Cherry"
1967	The Forsyte Saga	Winifred Dartie	23 episodes
1968	ITV Playhouse	Gladys King	Episode: "The Bonegrinder"
1969	NET Playhouse	Isobel Cherry	Episode: "Flowering Cherry"
1969	The First Churchills	Queen Anne	9 episodes
1969–1978	Jackanory	Storyteller	17 episodes
1974	BBC Play of the Month	Mrs. Linden	Episode: "The Linden Tree"
1976	I, Claudius	Antonia	
1979	Quatermass	Annie Morgan	2 episodes
1981	Lady Killers	Mrs. Lillian Bywaters	Episode: "The Darlingest Boy"
1981–1982	BBC2 Playhouse	Madam Fyolka/Daphne	2 episodes
1982	BBC Television Shakespeare	Paulina	Episode: The Winter's Tale
1982	An Inspector Calls	Sybil Birling	Miniseries
1982	Charles & Diana: A Royal Love Story	Queen Elizabeth II	TV movie
1985	The Corsican Brothers	Madame de Guidice	TV movie
1987	Miss Marple	Clothilde Bradbury-Scott	Episode: "Nemesis"
1992–2000	The Young Indiana Jones Chronicles	Miss Seymour	14 episodes
1994	Alleyn Mysteries	Emily Pride	Episode: "Dead Water"
1998	Dalziel and Pascoe	Ella Keech	Episode: "Child's Play"
1998	Our Mutual Friend	Lady Tippins	4 episodes
2000, 2009	Midsomer Murders	Naomi Inkpen/Harriet Compton	2 episodes
2003	Heartbeat	Edna Barton	Episode: "Caped Crusaders"
2005	Doc Martin	Muriel Steel	Episode: "Old Dogs"
2006	Rosemary & Thyme	Audrey Pargeter	Episode: "Seeds of Time"
2009	Midsomer Murders	Harriet Compton	Episode: "Small Mercies"
2011	EastEnders	Lydia Simmonds	3 episodes

== Discography ==
- Jerome Kern: Show Boat, conducted by John McGlinn, EMI, 1988
