= Tabitha Byron =

British actress (born 2010)

- Born: 2010 (age 15–16)
- Occupation: Actress
- Years active: 2017–
- Television: EastEnders

Tabitha Byron (born 2010) is a British actress. From the age of five, she played Constance Calendar in the children's drama series Hetty Feather (2017–20). She has also made appearances in Cat on a Hot Tin Roof at the Apollo Theatre, the short film Femi (2018), the series The Third Day (2020) and the film Education (2020). Byron also had a role in the 2021 film Sweetheart. Between 2021 and 2023, she portrayed Scarlett Butcher on the BBC soap opera EastEnders. Byron has also interviewed various celebrities for Marvel Entertainment and Disney Channel and has featured in advertisements.

== Life and career ==
Tabitha Byron was born in 2010. She is from London, England, and she began her career when she was five years old. She has taken acting classes at the New London Performing Arts Centre. Byron's older sister grew up acting and would help her prepare and take her to auditions. When she was five years old, she featured in an advert for Heathrow Airport, where she played a "sassy business lady". She was later cast in an advert for the American fast food sandwich restaurant Arby's.

At the age of five, Byron began portraying Constance Calendar in the third season of the children's drama series Hetty Feather, which premiered in 2017, and she continued until the show's end in 2020. She got the audition for the role the same week she got auditions for Heathrow Airport and Arby's. Byron found it "amazing" to see the Hetty Feather set in-person as she had previously watched the show. Byron was the youngest person on set and was glad that the older cast members included her. She filmed it in Kent, away from her home, during her stint on the show, which she called a "massive part" of her life. Byron felt lucky that the writers trusted her with "a big storyline for the final series". When she was six years old, she made her West End debut in Cat on a Hot Tin Roof, playing one of the children; the play ran at the Apollo Theatre and was also filmed and put on the National Theatre at Home website. She was filming the fourth series of Hetty Feather whilst taking part in the play and thus would commute twice a week from Kent to London to perform at the Apollo. In 2018, she also appeared in National Theatre Live: Cat on a Hot Tin Roof, the National Theatre Live's live screening of the play. That same year, she appeared in the short film Femi. In 2020, she had a guest appearance in the drama-thriller television series The Third Day. She considered it a "really cool job to do" and liked her experience there, including the fact that it was filmed on an island. That same year, she made an appearance in the film Education, part of the anthology Small Axe. Byron portrayed Dana in the 2021 film Sweetheart. She enjoyed being on the production and revealed that she and the cast were often allowed to improvise.

In August 2021, it was announced that Byron joined the cast of the BBC soap opera EastEnders as Scarlett Butcher, the daughter of Janine Butcher (Charlie Brooks), who had been announced to be returning to the soap earlier that year. The character had previously debuted in the soap in 2012. Byron made her first appearance as Scarlett in the episode originally airing on 27 August 2021. Scarlett was later written out of the soap and Byron last departed in the episode originally airing on 26 January 2023, along with Sid Owen, who portrayed Scarlett's uncle Ricky Butcher.

In addition to acting, Byron has been an interviewer for Marvel Entertainment and Disney Channel and has interviewed figures such as American actors Zoe Saldaña and Chris Pratt.

== Acting credits ==
=== Filmography ===
Year	Title	Role	Notes	Ref.
2017–20	Hetty Feather	Constance Calendar	Main cast	
2018	National Theatre Live: Cat on a Hot Tin Roof	—N/a	Part of National Theatre Live	
2018	Femi	Bonnie	Short film	
2020	The Third Day	Dig Girl	Guest role (1 episode)	
2020	Education	Sheila	Part of Small Axe anthology	
2021	Sweetheart	Dana	Coming-of-age film	
2021–23	EastEnders	Scarlett Butcher	Recurring role	

=== Theatre ===
Year	Production	Role	Venue	Refs.
c. 2017	Cat on a Hot Tin Roof	Child	Apollo Theatre	
