= Heather Chasen =

English actress (1927–2020)

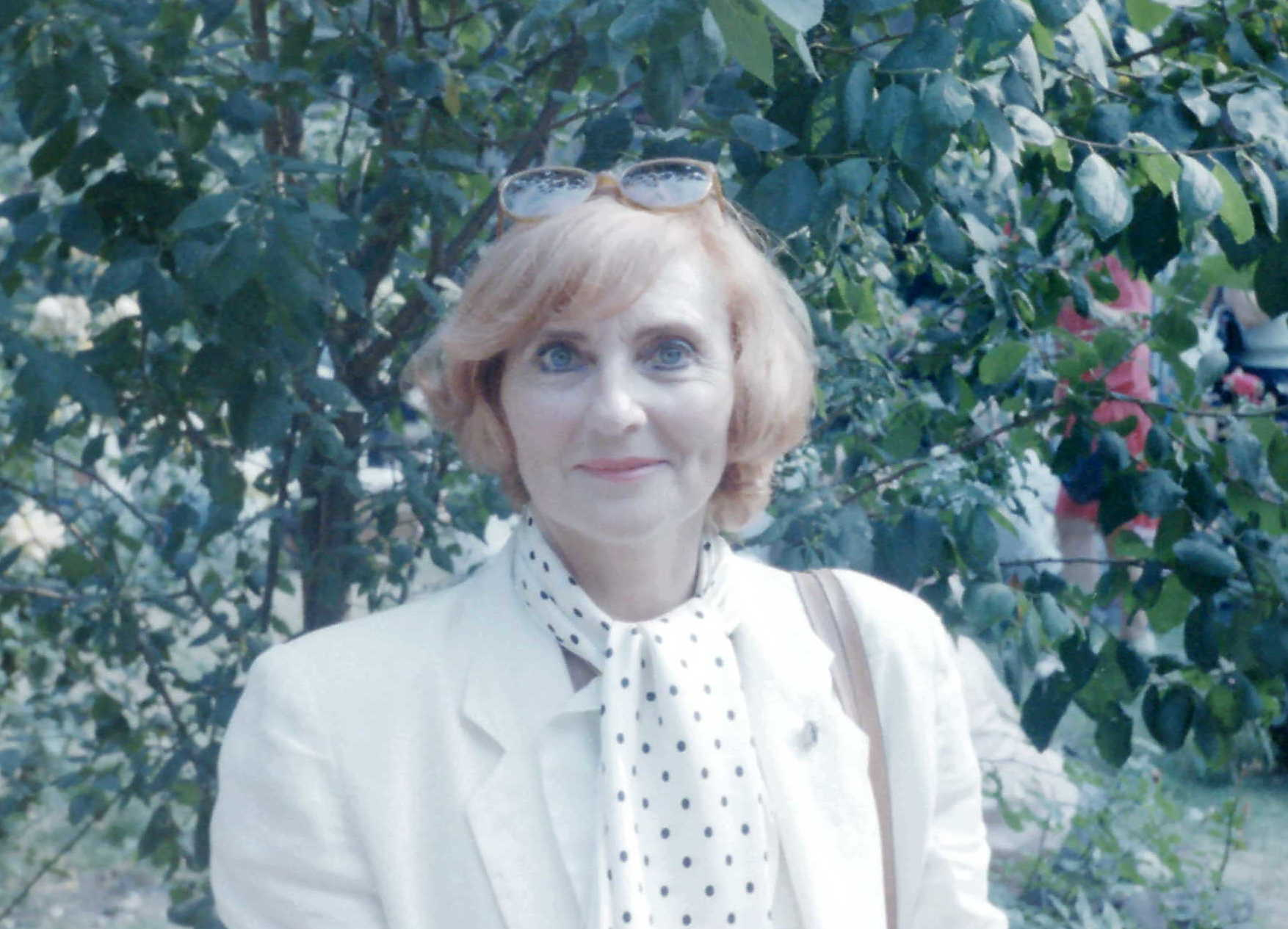
- Born: Heather Jean Chasen; 20 July 1927; British Singapore
- Died: 22 May 2020 (aged 92); Marylebone, London, England
- Occupation: Actress
- Years active: 1945–2014
- Notable work: See below
- Television: Crossroads; Marked Personal; EastEnders
- Children: 1
- Parents: F.N. Chasen (father); Agnes H. McCullock (mother)

Heather Jean Chasen (20 July 1927 – 22 May 2020) was an English actress, known for her roles in soap operas; playing Valerie Pollard in the ITV soap opera, Crossroads, from 1982 to 1986 and guest roles in Doctors, Holby City and Family Affairs. Chasen also played many roles in BBC Radio 2's The Navy Lark from 1959 to 1977, and appeared in the television series Marked Personal from 1973 to 1974. She played the recurring role of Lydia Simmonds in the BBC soap opera EastEnders, a role which received positive reviews from critics and EastEnders crew and cast members. Furthermore, she appeared extensively in theatre productions and film; in 2012, she appeared in a film version of Les Misérables.

== Early life ==
Chasen was born on 20 July 1927, in Singapore to Agnes H. (née McCullock) and F.N. Chasen, an English ornithologist. Her father fought as a trooper with the Norfolk Yeomanry in World War I. In 1921, he left England to work at the Raffles Library and Museum in Singapore, marrying Chasen's mother, Agnes, in 1926. Chasen's sister, Christine Elizabeth, was born on 4 May 1931. Her parents split up in 1938, and both later remarried.

Before the Japanese occupation, which led to the Battle of Singapore during World War II, Chasen and her mother left Singapore on the last boat before the occupation. Her father, however, on a separate ship, HMS Giang Bee, died when it was sunk by the Japanese on 12 February 1942. Chasen's stepfather, G.C.R. Franks, also died in fighting, on 22 March. Chasen and her mother moved to the UK and she trained at the Royal Academy of Dramatic Art, where she acted on stage and went on tour with Frankie Howerd in Hotel Paradiso. She appeared with Sybil Thorndike in Call Me Jacky, and toured with Douglas Fairbanks Jr. in The Pleasure of his Company, in Toronto.

== Career ==
=== Crossroads and EastEnders ===
I did an episode where I played this journalist which they must have quite liked because they got back to me about a month later. [They asked me] 'Would you come back and join the cast and change the colour of your hair?' Well, I said okay and so I changed my [hair] colour from red to blonde and I looked exactly the same! I didn't look any different at all. And so then I came back as this naughty lady, Valerie Pollard. The most fun I had was when I was helping out behind the bar which is a very good place to be if you're in a soap because you're in every scene. I was very happy, it was a fun time, I enjoyed it. At the beginning, not at the very end. When I first joined it, for the first few months I was in, it was great fun but after Jack (the producer) went it became less good and less fun and I didn't enjoy it so much".

— Chasen describing her time on Crossroads, from 1982 to 1986

In 2011, Chasen was cast as Lydia Simmonds, Janine Butcher (Charlie Brooks)'s maternal grandmother and Norman Simmonds' (George Layton) mother, in the BBC soap opera EastEnders, after the original actress Margaret Tyzack had to pull out of the role for personal reasons. Two episodes featuring Tyzack had already been broadcast, and she featured in a further one on 14 April. Chasen was cast and replaced Tyzack in the role, beginning filming on 15 April for scenes broadcast from 21 April. EastEnders' executive producer, Bryan Kirkwood, added: "In order to continue the current storyline we've taken the decision for Heather Chasen to take over the role of Lydia." The character died on-screen and Chasen made her last appearance on 13 June 2011, and, though not credited for it, did a voice-over for the 14 and 28 June episodes. Kirkwood later said "Lydia's storyline was perfect" and that Chasen had made the part her own after Tyzack's departure. Brooks said of the storyline as a whole, "I absolutely loved exploring Janine's background. I was really proud with the scenes with Heather Chasen [Lydia]. It was really hard work, but worth it."

=== Other work ===
Chasen appeared in other television programmes such as The Bill and The Harry Hill Show. She had guest roles in Z-Cars and Dixon of Dock Green and voiced a number of characters in the radio show The Navy Lark, particularly WREN Heather Chasen and "battle axe" Ramona Povey. In soaps, she had four separate appearances in the BBC soap opera Doctors, with her most recent in 2014, reprising her role as Grace Barberry from 2012. She played Sylvie Leigh in Holby City and, for five episodes, Madge Bennet in the Channel 5 soap opera, Family Affairs. Earlier credits include, playing "rich bitches" Caroline Kerr, in The Newcomers and Isabel Neal in Marked Personal, alongside Stephanie Beacham. She also played the "evil" headmistress in Schoolgirls in Uniform at the Battersea Arts Centre. In stage and theatre, Chasen appeared in The Rat Trap. Michael Billington from The Guardian described Chasen's character, Burrage the maid, as "trundling", rating the play three stars. Other than this, she appeared in Pardon Ma Prime Minister alongside Gerald Flood and Paul Curran, written by Edward Taylor and John Graham who created the BBC radio series The Men from the Ministry. The Birmingham Mail described the play as "hilarious" and "promising". One of Chasen's last plays was My Three Angels in which she played Madame Parole, other plays included, The Man Who Came to Dinner, Who Bombed Birmingham playing Margaret Thatcher, and The Lizard of Rock, in which she played the main role, appearing alongside actor Jack Hawkins. Chasen opined that she had a "lovely time" playing Miss Marple in A Murder is Announced alongside Richard Todd and Barbara Murray. In 2009, Chasen appeared in the award-winning Anglo-Russian feature film Season of Mists, playing Jane. Chasen appeared alongside Marina Blake, Sergei Chonishvili, Ifan Huw Dafydd and ex-EastEnders actor Dudley Sutton. Other films she has appeared in include, The Kiss of Tosca in 2000, The Toybox in 2003 and Cat Run, a 2011 film.

== Personal life and death ==
Chasen was friends with, and previously had a relationship with, Amanda Barrie. In Call Me Jacky, she played an alcoholic lesbian, and later claimed to have based her characterisation partly on the novelist and playwright Patricia Highsmith, whom she knew well.

In 1949, Chasen married John Webster, and they had one son, Rupert, who played in Lindsay Anderson's if.... He also appears with Chasen in a 2013 short documentary, A Stage of Development.

Chasen died on 22 May 2020, aged 92.

== Awards and nominations ==
Chasen was nominated for the Tony Award for Best Performance by a Featured Actress in a Musical, while she appeared in the New York adaptation of A Severed Head between 1963–1965. She appeared in the cast of the Seasons of Mists which won a number of awards internationally.

== Filmography ==
Film

| Year | Title | Role |
|---|---|---|
| 1949 | Meet the Duke | Carol |
| 1971 | Naughty! | Victorian Madame |
| 1971 | Suburban Wives | Kathy Lambert |
| 1972 | Commuter Husbands | Wife |
| 1972 | On the Game | Madame |
| 1976 | The Deadly Females | Frances |
| 1989 | The Plot to Kill Hitler | The Baroness |
| 2000 | The Kiss of Tosca | Tosca |
| 2003 | The Toybox | Gran |
| 2009 | Season of Mists | Jane |
| 2010 | The Social Network | Matt's wife |
| 2011 | Cat Run | Bingham's Mom |
| 2012 | Les Misérables | Madame Magloire |

Television

| Year | Title | Role | Notes |
|---|---|---|---|
| 1960 | No Hiding Place | Brenda | 1 episode |
| 1960 | The Cheaters | Mary Calder | 1 episode |
| 1960 | The World of Tim Frazer | Helen Baker | 6 episodes |
| 1960 | Danger Man | Helen Hamilton | 1 episode |
| 1961 | Danger Man | Lorain Zameda | 1 episode |
| 1961 | Walk a Crooked Mile | Angela Charles | 1 episode |
| 1961 | Inspector Maigret | Guest | 1 episode |
| 1961 | Dixon of Dock Green | Laura Beckley | 1 episode |
| 1962 | Saki | Agnes Huddle | 1 episode |
| 1962 | Dixon of Dock Green | Stella Judd | 1 episode |
| 1963 | Jezebel ex UK | Rita Lorraine | 1 episode |
| 1963 | Suspense | Clarice Morrison | 1 episode |
| 1965 | The Newcomers | Caroline Kerr | 1 episode |
| 1967 | Z-Cars | Pamela Raven | 2 episodes |
| 1969 | Call My Bluff | Herself | 1 episode |
| 1973–1974 | Marked Personal | Isabel Neal | 84 episodes |
| 1977 | Play of the Month: Waste | Lady Julia Farrant | 1 episode |
| 1978 | A Traveller in Time | Mary, Queen of Scots | 3 episodes |
| 1981 | Lady Killers | Mrs. Martinetti | 1 episode |
| 1982 | Crossroads | Reporter | 1 episode |
| 1982 | Young Sherlock: The Mystery of the Manor House | Aunt Rachel | 5 episodes |
| 1982–1986 | Crossroads | Valerie Pollard | Unknown |
| 1983 | Shades of Darkness | Minor Role | 1 episode |
| 1989 | Heat of the Day | Mrs Kelway | 1 episode |
| 1990 | Who Bombed Birmingham | Margaret Thatcher | 1 episode |
| 1992 | The Eligible Bachelor | The Hon Amelia | 1 episode |
| 1992 | Surgical Spirit | Sabatini's Mother | 1 episode |
| 2003, 2010 | Holby City | Sylvie Leigh | 2 episodes |
| 2003 | The Bill | Mrs. Belstram | 1 episode |
| 2003 | The All New Harry Hill Show | Betty | 1 episode |
| 2003, 2006, 2012, 2014 | Doctors | Norma; Ida Price; Grace Barberry | 4 episodes |
| 2005 | Casualty | Bessie Symes | 1 episode |
| 2005 | Family Affairs | Madge Bennett | 5 episodes |
| 2011 | EastEnders | Lydia Simmonds | 11 episodes |
| 2013 | Dancing on the Edge | Lady Altringham | 1 episode |

Radio

| Year | Title | Role |
|---|---|---|
| 1959–1977 | The Navy Lark | WRN Chasen; Mrs Ramona Povey; Rita Murray; Morpeth Goldstein; Natasha Snogitoff; Lady Quirk; Miss Simpkins; Lady Todhunter-Brown; Lucy Doll; Queen Jaratova; Wren Simkins; Second Officer Maclootie; Lady Hamilton; Myrtle Pertwee; Mrs Sedgwick; Fatima Sumpbolt; Nurse at the RN College, Dartmouth; Renee, daughter of the landlord of the Popple's Head pub and barmaid at the pub Judith "Judikins" Povey; Exotic & Sultry Tanya (Agent no.5); Agent No.2 (working for The Mistress); Mrs Granthimum; Norwegian waitress Dolores "the Danglers"; Fifi; Miss Esmeralda Crimp; Leading Wren Felicity Pertwee; The Mayoress of Whittlesea Bay; 1st Officer Anastasia Pertwee; Grotty Gertie; Miss Queeg; Letitia Phillips; Astrid Feltbody |
| 1966 | The Embassy Lark | HE Fatima Soriaya Fazalik, Turkish Ambassador to Tratvia |
| 1967 | Sexton Blake adventures | Paula Dane |

Stage/Theatre

| Year | Title | Role |
|---|---|---|
| 1945 | Donna Clarines | Marcella |
| 1954 | Blood Wedding | Leonardo's wife |
| 1958 | Little Eyolf | Rita Allmers |
| 1958 | Templeton | Anna Dasousa |
| 1958 | The Mousetrap | Mollie Ralston |
| 1960 | The Lizard of the Rock | Main Role |
| 1962 | A Midsummer Night's Dream | Helena |
| 1962 | Policy for Murder | Lee Miller |
| 1963 | The Maids | Solange |
| 1963, 1964, 1965 | A Severed Head | Antonia Lynch Gibbon |
| 1966 | Love from Liz | Nancy Morrow |
| 1966 | Jorrocks | Mrs Barnington |
| 1966 | Thriller of the Year | Gillian Howard |
| 1967 | Who's Afraid of Virginia Woolf? | Martha |
| 1967–1968 | Call me Jacky | Countess; Ardele; Gina Ekdal; The Wild Duck; Jacqueline du Bois |
| 1969 | Forty Years On | Matron |
| 1969 | Lady S | Lady Susan |
| 1970 | Lady Frederick | Marchioness of Mereston |
| 1970–1972 | The Pleasure of his Company | Katherine Daugherty |
| 1971 | Hello and Goodbye | Hester |
| 1971 | The Amorous Prawn | Mrs. Fitzadam |
| 1971 | The Magistrate | Queen Margaret; Richard III; Agatha |
| 1972 | Children of the Wolf | Helena |
| 1973 | Baby Love | Mrs. Taylor |
| 1975 | Hay Fever | Judith Bliss |
| 1975 | Butterflies Are Free | Mrs. Baker |
| 1975 | Madame de Sade | Alison; Diaries; Comtesse de Saint Fond |
| 1977 | Rebecca | Beatrice Lacy |
| 1978 | Murder in a Bad Light | Olivia Waynward |
| 1979 | The Eagle Has Two Heads | Edith de Berg |
| 1979 | The Man Who Came To Dinner | Miss Preen |
| 1994 | A Murder is Announced | Miss Marple |
| 1996 | Black Chiffon | Nanny |
| 1997 | School Girls in Uniform | The Headmistress |
| 1999 | Sweet Bramleys | June |
| 1999 | Laying the Ghost | Freda |
| 2000 | Getting On | Minor Role |
| 2001 | Mountain Language | Elderly Lady |
| 2002 | My Three Angles | Madame Parole |
| 2006 | The Rat Trap | Burrage the Maid |
| 2008 | Pardon Ma Prime Minister | Lead Role |
