= The Rat Trap =

1918 play written by Noël Coward

Original production, 1926: from left: Sheila and Keld, Olive, Naomi and Edmund

The Rat Trap (1918) is a four-act drama by Noël Coward, written when he was 18, but not staged until he was 26, by which time he was well known as a rising playwright, after the success of The Vortex. The play depicts the clash of egos between a married couple of writers, the wife's attempts to keep the marriage stable, the husband's philandering, her departure and his attempts to win her back.

== Background and first production ==
What Coward called his "first really serious attempt at psychological conflict", was written when he was 18. In his 1937 memoirs, Present Indicative, he admits that as "a whole it was immature, but it was much steadier than anything I had done hitherto ... when I had finished it, I felt, for the first time with genuine conviction, that I could really write plays."

It was first performed on 18 October 1926, for 12 performances at the Everyman Theatre, Hampstead, in London, presented by George Carr (who also directed), Raymond Massey (who also played a supporting role), and Allan Wade. Coward was by now well known, after his success as author and star of The Vortex, which had made his name in the West End and on Broadway. He was unable to see the production of The Rat Trap as he was by then travelling back to New York for the premiere of his This Was a Man. He later wrote, "in spite of the effulgence of the cast, the play fizzled out at the end of its regulation two weeks. I was not particularly depressed about this; The Rat Trap was a dead love."

== Original cast ==
- Olive Lloyd-Kennedy – Mary Robson
- Sheila Brandreth – Joyce Kennedy
- Keld Maxwell – Robert Harris
- Naomi Frith-Bassington – Elizabeth Pollock
- Edmund Crowe – Raymond Massey
- Burrage – Clare Greet
- Ruby Raymond – Adrianne Allen

Source: Mander and Mitchenson.

== Synopsis ==
Sheila, a promising novelist, is engaged to Keld, an aspiring playwright. Sheila's flatmate, Olive, warns Sheila that when two talented egotists marry there is likely to be trouble, and that Sheila may end up subordinating herself to Keld, which would be a tragedy as, in Olive's view, Sheila is far the better writer. Sheila nonetheless marries Keld, and Olive's warning is proved correct: the couple are "like two rats in a trap, fighting, fighting, fighting". Sheila persists in trying to keep the relationship working, but her own writing has come to a halt. She discovers that Keld is having an affair with a pushy young actress, Ruby, and tells him she is leaving him. With her faithful housekeeper, Burrage, Sheila moves to a cottage in Cornwall. Keld comes to see her and she tells him that although she no longer loves him she is prepared to come back to him because she is pregnant and feels "so alone and so dreadfully frightened".

== Publication ==
The play was published in London by Ernest Benn in 1924 in volume 13 of the Contemporary British Dramatists series, and was republished by Heinemann in 1934 in Coward's Play Parade, Volume III. In his introduction Coward writes:

It is not without merit. There is some excruciatingly sophisticated dialogue in the first act of which, at the time, I was inordinately proud. From the point of view of construction, it is not very good, except for the two principal quarrel scenes. The last act is an inconclusive shambles and is based on the sentimental and inaccurate assumption that the warring egos of the man and wife will simmer down into domestic bliss merely because the wife is about to have a dear little baby. I suppose I was sincere about this at the time, but I find it very hard to believe. I think it will only be interesting as a play to ardent students of my work, of which I hope there are several. I do not believe it has ever been done since its original production, even by amateurs, which is a pity, as I would love to see it. (Note: An amateur production was staged in Belfast in 1934, the year in which Coward's comment was published.)

== Critical response ==
The critic J. T. Grein praised the play – "it held me from beginning to end" – and questioned why West End managements had not taken it up. "Surely The Rat Trap will come West; I for one, would gladly see it again". The reviewer in The Daily News commented that the work was extraordinary for so young an author as Coward had been when he wrote it: "The second act is constructively a piece of work that might be envied by a dramatist with years of experience".

== Revivals ==
A professional revival of the play was presented at the Finborough Theatre, a London fringe venue in Earl's Court, as part of its Forgotten Voices Season 2006, from 28 November to 23 December 2006, in a production directed by Tim Luscombe, which received good press notices. Gregory Finnegan and Catherine Hamilton played the leading roles, with veteran actress Heather Chasen as Burrage.

The play received its American Premiere in 2022 with Mint Theater Company.

== Notes, references and sources ==
=== Sources ===
- Coward, Noël (2004) [1932]. Present Indicative – Autobiography to 1931. London: Methuen. ISBN 978-0-413-77413-2.
- Mander, Raymond; Joe Mitchenson (2000) [1957]. Theatrical Companion to Coward. Barry Day and Sheridan Morley (2000 edition, ed.) (second ed.). London: Oberon Books. ISBN 978-1-84002-054-0.
