= Frank Butcher =

Fictional character from BBC soap opera EastEnders

- EastEnders character
- Portrayed by: Mike Reid
- Duration: 1987–2000, 2002, 2005
- First appearance: Episode 268; 8 September 1987
- Last appearance: Episode 3060; 9 December 2005
- Introduced by: Julia Smith (1987); Corinne Hollingworth (1995); Jane Harris (1997); Mike Hudson (1998); John Yorke (2002); Kate Harwood (2005)
- Spin-off appearances: Dimensions in Time (1993); Perfectly Frank (2003)
In-universe information
- Other names: Neville
- Occupation: Businessman; Barman; Car salesman; Pub landlord
- Father: George Butcher
- Mother: Mo Butcher
- Sisters: Joan Garwood
- Wife: June Simmonds (backstory); Pat Wicks (1989–1996); Peggy Mitchell (1999–2001)
- Sons: Ricky Butcher; Danny
- Daughters: Clare Butcher; Diane Butcher; Janine Butcher
- Grandsons: Jacques Butcher; Liam Butcher
- Granddaughters: Natasha Butcher; Tiffany Butcher; Scarlett Butcher

Frank Butcher is a fictional character from the BBC soap opera EastEnders, played by Mike Reid. Frank makes his first appearance on-screen as a guest character in 1987, but due to a positive viewer reception, he is reintroduced in 1988 as a regular. Reid took a long hiatus from EastEnders in 1994 and Frank remained off-screen for over a year and a half. Frank made his return as a recurring character from December 1995 to January 1998. Frank eventually becomes a regular once again from May 1998 to November 2000, when Reid quit the show. Frank makes three brief reappearances after that, the final one in December 2005. Following Reid's death in July 2007, Frank died off-screen and the character was celebrated with a special week of episodes in April 2008.

Frank is a wheeler-dealer who likes to think of himself as a "big player" in the business world, but in reality, he is little more than a wily conman. He is a smooth-talker and full of charm, but his actions are often thoughtless and he tends to run instead of facing up to his responsibilities, leaving his loved ones to pick up the pieces. His love affair with Pat Harris (Pam St Clement) stems back to his teens, and he can never quite let her go, always breaking her heart, disappearing, and returning to break it all over again.

== Character creation and development ==
The character of Frank was introduced to the series in September 1987, when he met up with former girlfriend Pat Wicks (Pam St. Clement). Although it could not have been predicted at the time, Frank was perhaps the most important introduction to the series that year, as the popularity of his appearance led to him playing a far greater role the following year. Frank was played by Mike Reid, who was already an established comedian and well known to British audiences. The casting of a comedian in a dramatic role was highly controversial at the time, but over the years, the wisdom of that decision was proved correct, as Frank became one of the show's most popular and iconic characters. His successful casting set a precedent in British soap, and subsequently, many established comedians and comic actors have gone on to play substantial roles in several notable soap operas, including Barbara Windsor, Bradley Walsh, Shane Richie, Bobby Davro and Les Dennis, among others.

Frank in the early 1990s. The character was often seen wearing a trilby, raincoat and large tinted glasses.

Following Anita Dobson's (Angie) and Leslie Grantham's (Den) decisions to quit the show in 1988, Frank was reintroduced as a full-time character and installed as the new Landlord of The Queen Vic, which he ran with his future wife, Pat, before opening a used car-lot on the Square. Although extremely different from their predecessors, Frank and Pat were also a live-wire couple, whose relationship proved popular with the audience. Their wedding in 1989 was seen as one of the year's highlights. Penned by new EastEnders writer Tony Jordan, Frank and Pat celebrated their big day in true East End style with a street party organised by Frank's mother, Mo (Edna Doré). Although planned for a summer's day, the lot material filmed on Albert Square was recorded in the middle of gale-force winds. The episode was scripted to portray a strong sense of community spirit and a feel-good theme, as until that year, EastEnders had come under attack from critics who suggested the show had become too depressing. Some 11.9 million viewers tuned in to see Frank and Pat finally tie the knot.

However, as is customary in EastEnders, their marriage did not remain happy for long, and after an array of family and monetary problems, Frank began to sink into deep depression. Playing a depressed character took its toll on Mike Reid, and he also began to suffer with depression, so, in 1994, he took a long hiatus from EastEnders. On-screen, his character attempted an insurance scam by having his car-lot torched and was unable to cope with the resulting guilt after the fire claimed the life of a homeless man. Frank disappeared from the show under a cloud of mystery in April 1994, and for a while he was presumed dead, as none of his family had heard anything from him. Pat eventually moved on, and moved in with another man, only for Frank to make a shocking return. Almost 17 million viewers tuned in to see Frank reunited with Pat on Christmas Day 1995. His stay was brief, lasting only a few months, but it drew a line under his relationship with Pat, and after failing to win her back, Frank was forced to move on too. Frank made several brief appearances in the show after this time, but in May 1998, he made a full-time return, this time as a love interest to landlady Peggy Mitchell (Barbara Windsor). However, Frank's affinity with Pat remained an underlying theme for both characters, and despite being separated, viewers were regularly reminded of their lustful connection. Pat's fourth husband Roy Evans (Tony Caunter) was deliberately made impotent in the series, so Pat would not be sexually unfaithful to Frank. In an interview, Pam St. Clement has suggested that Pat and Frank are the biggest "love story" in EastEnders, commenting: "the trouble is, they're a classic example of a couple who can't live with each other and yet don't want to live without each other."

Upon his return, Frank was once again pivotal to many explosive storylines including accidentally killing Tiffany Mitchell (Martine McCutcheon) with his car, his marriage to Peggy, and a battle to regain control of The Queen Vic from Dan Sullivan (Craig Fairbrass). However, in early 2000, Reid began to go through some poor health. After suffering with heart problems and nervous exhaustion, which he attributed to EastEnders' gruelling filming schedule, Reid was forced to take an unplanned break from the show. Penned scripts and plots had to be completely rewritten to account for his absence, including the departure of Sid Owen, who played Reid's on-screen son Ricky. The storyline was initially planned to have Frank and Ricky involved in one of EastEnders renowned two-hander episodes, but due to Reid's absence, Steve McFadden, who plays Phil Mitchell, had to stand in for the episode, resulting in a slightly less plausible plotline. Upon Reid's return, further problems arose, allegedly regarding the producers' decision not to allow him to attend a charity function that was being held in his honour. Reid allegedly quit in protest, although the BBC have since denied this. Reid was persuaded by producer John Yorke to remain in the role for a further six months in order to facilitate one further explosive storyline. Frank resumed his relationship with old flame Pat whilst still married to Peggy, but was famously caught out and shamed by his fuming wife in front of a packed pub on Guy Fawkes Night 2000, although Pat had decided against running away with Frank at the last minute. After receiving a hefty slap, Frank left once again, leaving his wife in serious debt, just as he had done to Pat years earlier.

Following this, Frank made several brief appearances in the show, and was even given his own spin-off special, entitled EastEnders: Perfectly Frank. The programme followed Frank as he set up a new business in Somerset and brought in an entirely new set of characters unrelated to those in Albert Square. The soap bubble was written by Tony Jordan, directed by Clive Arnold and aired in 2003. The project was relatively unsuccessful, and was only watched by 3.8 million viewers. Despite rumours that the concept was being groomed as a potential spin-off series, this did not materialise.

Frank made yet another comeback to EastEnders in late 2005, for another week's stint, but Reid made it clear on The Paul O'Grady Show that this was to be the final time viewers would see Frank, as the storyline gave ultimate closure to his relationship with Pat. Reid allegedly turned down subsequent offers of a return.

Following the sudden death of Mike Reid in July 2007, executive producer Diederick Santer announced in November 2007 that the character would die off-screen; this occurred at the end of March 2008, when it was revealed that Frank had succumbed to throat cancer. On-screen, Frank was brought back to Walford to be cremated and was given a send-off in a special week of episodes, dubbed Frank Week, which saw his former wives Peggy and Pat reigniting their old feud. Throughout the episode of his funeral on 1 April, old clips of Frank's time in the serial were played as flashbacks, including Frank and Pat's wedding from 1989 and Frank naked in a revolving bow-tie from 2000.

== Storylines ==
=== Backstory ===
Frank started out as a used-car salesman. He met Pat Harris (Pam St Clement) at Butlins in Clacton in 1958 and, despite being on holiday with his girlfriend June Simmonds, he was attracted to Pat. They had a passionate affair but June became pregnant, so he married her and broke Pat's heart. Frank and Pat met up from time to time and on each occasion the affair was rekindled, but Frank would not leave June; Pat eventually married and had two children of her own. Frank and June had four children: Clare (Lucy Foxell/Caroline O'Neill) in 1959, Ricky (Sid Owen) in 1973, Diane (Sophie Lawrence) in 1974, and Janine (Rebecca Michael, Alexia Demetriou, Charlie Brooks) in 1983. June died of cancer in 1987 (although upon Frank's introduction, he says she died of a heart attack following the strain of Janine’s birth), leaving Frank widowed and their children motherless.

=== 1987–2000 ===
Frank and Pat Wicks marry on 22 June 1989

In September 1987, Frank contacts Pat and they meet in Greenwich. Frank wants to reignite their romance and asks her to be the mother of his children but she refuses. Frank propositions Pat again in January 1988. Pat is still resistant but when Frank reappears in March, he finally convinces her to reunite. They take over the tenancy of The Queen Victoria public house soon afterwards, and the following year Frank also opens a car lot on the square. Frank and Pat marry in June 1989 in true cockney style, with Pat becoming stepmother to Ricky, Diane, and 5-year-old Janine (Rebecca Michael), who hates her.

Troubled by family upsets, Frank is devastated in 1990 when his mother Mo (Edna Doré) develops dementia. Her deterioration is rapid. In a lucid moment, she writes Frank a letter asking him not to let her end up like her grandmother, who had gone senile, saying she would rather die than suffer the same fate. Frank is torn, but attempts to adhere to his mother's wish by almost smothering her with a pillow while she sleeps. However, he cannot go through with it and instead sends Mo to live with his sister Joan Garwood (Mary Miller) in Colchester. In 1992, Frank was involved and helped Pete Beale (Peter Dean), Ian Beale (Adam Woodyatt) and Big Ron (Ron Tarr) to intimidate rapist James Willmott-Brown (William Boyde) into leaving the area. Later that year, Frank receives a huge tax demand, swiftly followed by a large VAT bill. This forces him to sell his B&B and the adjoining house and move his family into a small flat.

Pat establishes her own cab firm, PatCabs, which starts making them some money. However, on Christmas Eve that year, Pat runs over and kills a teenage girl and is later sentenced to six months in prison. Frank struggles alone and the Butchers end 1993 in financial ruin. In desperation, Frank coerces Phil Mitchell (Steve McFadden) to set fire to his car lot in March 1994, so he can claim on the insurance. The car lot catches fire, as agreed, but unbeknown to Phil and Frank, a homeless man is sleeping in one of the cars and burns to death. Frank is arrested on suspicion of manslaughter, but is later released due to lack of evidence. However, doubts remain as to whether he conspired to defraud his insurance company and an investigation takes place. Frank tries covering his tracks by claiming his accounts have burnt but Pat gives the business's books to the investigating agent. The pressure becomes too much for Frank, who is suffering severe guilt over the death of the homeless man. He becomes so depressed and despondent, no one can get through to him. Unable to cope, Frank leaves Walford and his family without warning in April 1994, and does not contact them to say where he is.

With no news of Frank, Pat is forced to get on with her life. She begins a romance with another car dealer, Roy Evans (Tony Caunter), in 1995 and by November, they are living together. When Pat receives a letter from a psychiatric hospital saying Frank has recovered from a breakdown and wants to reunite, she tears up the letter. On Christmas Day 1995, Frank arrives unannounced and is furious to discover Pat is living with Roy. Frank declares he wants his house, business, and children back and refuses to leave Walford. Pat's son David Wicks (Michael French) contacts his lawyers and is relieved to discover Frank has no claim on the car lot; however, Ricky gives his share of the business to Frank, who then threatens to sell Pat's house. Roy tries scaring Frank away via various underhand tricks. In a moment of remorse, Frank threatens to confess his involvement in the arson attack to the police. Pat attempts to make him reconsider and this leads to them having sex. Pat regrets her actions, but Frank takes great pleasure in telling Roy. Furious, Roy threatens to leave Pat; to stop him, she claims Frank is lying. She convinces Frank she does not love him; defeated, he leaves Walford in March 1996, and moves to Manchester.

He returns briefly in April 1997 for Ricky's wedding to Bianca Jackson (Patsy Palmer), and again in December to console Ricky following the loss of his child. On another visit in May 1998, he becomes attracted to landlady Peggy Mitchell (Barbara Windsor) and they soon begin a relationship. Peggy asks Frank to move in with her at The Vic and they soon announce their engagement. Roy remains jealous of Frank, believing Pat has feelings for her ex-husband. When Pat turns to Frank following an argument with Roy and is seen leaving his flat, Roy and Peggy believe Frank and Pat are having an affair. Peggy calls off her engagement, and Roy speeds off in his car on a suicide bid, but Frank manages to convince him that his relationship with Pat is now platonic. He and Roy bond, leading Frank to admit he got a young woman called Gemma pregnant after first moving to Manchester, and had a young son, Danny, who was born in 1995.

Peggy marries Frank in April 1999, despite opposition from her son Grant (Ross Kemp), who cannot forgive Frank for accidentally hitting and killing his wife Tiffany Mitchell (Martine McCutcheon) in a motor accident months earlier. Frank runs The Vic with Peggy, but in 2000 he starts to realise he is unhappy, as he still loves Pat. While the two couples holiday in Spain that summer, Pat and Frank have sex. Their affair continues for several months, and they eventually decide to elope to Manchester. They are due to leave on Guy Fawkes Night, but Pat has second thoughts. It is too late, however, as Peggy has already got Frank's letter of confession. Peggy shames Frank and Pat by reading the letter aloud in public, ending by slapping both Frank and Pat and then ejecting Frank. When Frank leaves Walford, Pat chases after him, shouting his name, but he does not hear, and drives away, leaving her sobbing in the rain.

=== 2002 ===
In January 2002, Peggy receives news that Frank has died in a car crash in Spain, and travels there for his funeral, where she is stunned to see him in attendance. Several irate conversations reveal that Frank has faked his death to con expatriates in a property scam with his new girlfriend, Krystle (Rula Lenska). Krystle in turn cons Frank, running off with his money. Despite his past actions, Peggy takes pity on him, and gives Frank money, but turns down the opportunity of resuming a relationship with him.

=== "Perfectly Frank" ===
In the special 2003 episode "Perfectly Frank", he returns to England, where he has set up a seedy nightclub and a car valeting service in Somerset. Problems arise when Frank receives a visit from council officer, Douglas Payne (Steve Elder), telling him that they have rejected his license to open a lap dancing club. Later, Frank's assistant, Kevin (Marc Jordan), is sent a car to valet by the local gangster, named Reg Priest (Gilbert Martin), and finds the body of Payne in the boot. Frank and his club staff try to find a way to avoid the police asking questions, and fall foul of Reg, so they throw the body into the water over the side of the pier. However, it later emerges that Reg only knocked Payne out, when he turns up alive, having survived the pier fall. Terrified of another attack, Payne agrees to approve Frank's license.

=== 2005 ===
In December 2005, when Pat is due to give evidence at the trial of Janine (now played by Charlie Brooks), who has been wrongly accused of murdering Laura Beale (Hannah Waterman), Frank tries to get Pat to change her testimony. Pat and Frank have sex, but she is angry when she realises Frank is using their relationship to manipulate her. Nevertheless, after some contemplation, Pat changes her testimony. She and Frank say an emotional farewell, with Frank commenting that he will always love her. Frank tries to reunite with Janine outside the court but is saddened to discover she had already left without him, and was only using him to secure her release.

On 31 March 2008, Diane and Ricky reveal that Frank has died at Diane's home in France of throat cancer. His body is brought to Walford to be cremated. Following the funeral, Frank's ashes are scattered in Albert Square's flowerbeds. A heartbroken Pat orders a commemorative plaque dedicated to Frank, and has it mounted in Albert Square: it reads "Frank Butcher 1940-2008, Husband, Father, Pilchard, Taken 68 years young".

== In popular culture ==
In the 1990s, Mike Reid starred in an advert for the then new soft drink Oasis, whose slogan at the time was "Open, pour, be yourself once more". In the advert, Reid was dressed as Frank and initially roamed around with an uncharacteristically sunny disposition, until he drank the beverage and trod in a cow pat. After this, he took on a miserable expression, and exclaimed "Pat... Oh Pat, what have you done to me Pat?" in a blatant reference to his EastEnders alter ego.

Frank Butcher is also the partial inspiration for the character Cockney Wanker in the British adult comic Viz. The cockney character of Billy Butcher from The Boys was also reportedly named after the EastEnders Butchers.

== Reception ==
Frank seducing Pat naked was voted the fifth top soap moment of all time in 2004.

Frank remains one of EastEnders best-loved characters and many associate him with a 'golden era of the square'. Following Mike Reid's death in 2007, BBC series controller, John Yorke, commented "Frank Butcher was one of a select group of truly great EastEnders' characters and the skill with which Mike Reid played him made him one of the most popular and well-loved of all."

In a Radio Times poll of over 5,000 people in 2004, 13 per cent chose Frank Butcher as the soap character they were most happy to see return. He came third in the poll, behind EastEnders' Den Watts (32 per cent) and Sharon Watts (21 per cent). Twelve per cent of viewers disagreed, as Frank also polled fourth place when viewers were asked "which soap character was it a bad idea to bring back?", coming behind Coronation Street's Bet Lynch (28 per cent), EastEnders Den Watts (28 per cent), and Coronation Street's Liz McDonald (14 per cent).

A comic scene that saw the character seduce Pat by arriving on her doorstep in nothing but a revolving bow-tie has been voted the fifth Top Soap Moment in a five poll in 2004, and he was also voted the seventh most popular King of Soaps in a Channel 4 poll in 2002. In addition, Frank is fondly remembered for his unique style of cockney slang. A term "dry slap" that Reid introduced into the character's dialogue has transitioned, and is now utilised in British culture as a noun to describe a punch.

In 2021, Laura-Jayne Tyler from Inside Soap called Frank "Walford's original diamond geezer" and wrote that it was "sad" that Frank had never met fellow character Mick Carter (Danny Dyer), predicting that they would have had a "right old bubble together.
