= Pam St Clement =

English actress (born 1942)

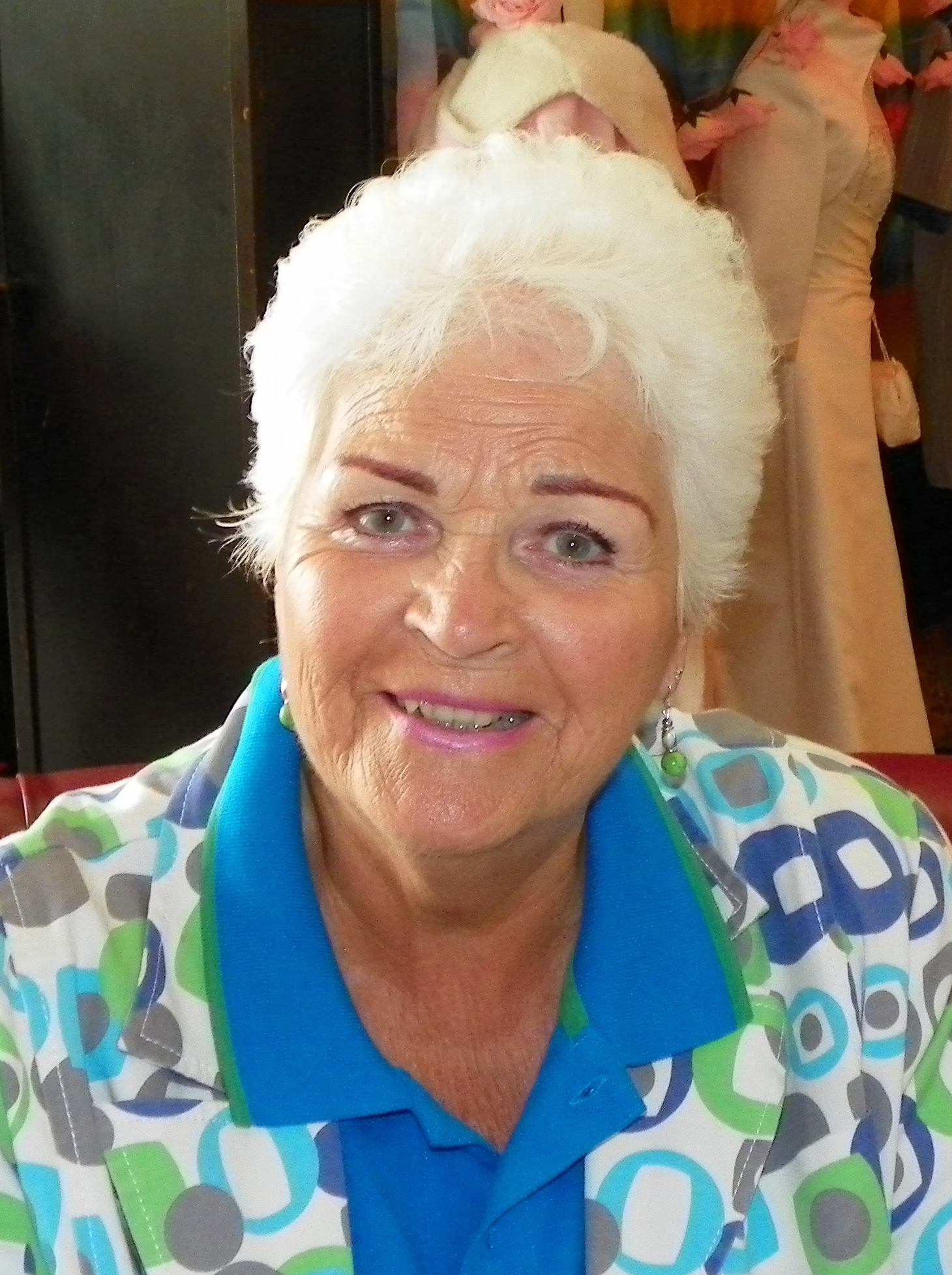
- St Clement in 2016
- Born: Pamela Ann Clements; 11 May 1942 (age 84); Harrow on the Hill, Middlesex, England
- Education: Rose Bruford College
- Occupation: Actress
- Years active: 1972–present
- Known for: Role of Pat Butcher in EastEnders
- Spouse: Andrew Louis Gordon (m. 1967; div. 1976)

Pamela Ann Clements (born 11 May 1942), known professionally as Pam St Clement, is an English actress. She is known for portraying Pat Butcher in the BBC soap opera EastEnders from 12 June 1986 until 1 January 2012, with guest appearances in May 2016 and December 2025, thereby becoming one of the programme's longest-serving cast members.

== Early life ==
St Clement's parents, Ann Tribe and Reginald Clements, married in 1940. Shortly after St Clement's birth in 1942, her mother died of tuberculosis, and she was put into foster care when her father remarried. St Clement subsequently grew up in various foster homes until she was taken in by a family who owned a farm in Devon.

She has commented: "I was very fortunate in the end. I was always being farmed off to holiday homes, then when I was just pre-teens I went down to Devon to some people who were very good at taking on youngsters, and what originated as a business arrangement became my home." St Clement's father rose to become the managing director of a toy manufacturer in London and was married five times. St Clement was sent to boarding school on the South Downs, where she was—by her own admission—"very naughty". She was active in the drama society at her school, but she originally had aspirations to become a veterinarian. However, this career proved unobtainable because she didn't pass Latin at school.

Instead she decided to become a teacher and enrolled at Rolle College in Exmouth (now part of the University of Plymouth). She worked in the teaching profession until her desire to act prompted her to attend drama school, the Rose Bruford College, and she eventually took up acting professionally. Her stage name was inspired by a street name in Islington – St Clement Street – where her parents resided at the time of their marriage. In July 2008, the University of Plymouth presented her with an honorary doctorate in education for her services to teaching. Commenting on her former job, she said she had not been a good teacher, so her career change was not a loss to the profession.

== Career ==
=== Early career ===
St Clement has worked extensively on the stage, in films and on television. Her acting career began in the 1970s, when she joined a small theatre company and she went on to have minor roles in programmes such as The Onedin Line (1972) and Follyfoot (1972). Her first big break came in 1974, when she was cast in an episode of TV prison drama, Within These Walls. Subsequent television credits have included: Van der Valk (1977); A Horseman Riding By as Meg Potter (1978); Emmerdale Farm (1980) as Mrs. Anne Eckersley; Thomas & Sarah (1980); Enemy at the Door (1978; 1980); Play for Today (1980); Minder (1980); Shoestring (1980); as Mary Chater in Lady Killers (1981), Dangerous Davies (1981); Angels (1981); as Frau Bodelschwingh in Private Schulz (1981); The Chinese Detective (1982); The Tripods (1984); Bottle Boys (1984); and Hammer House of Mystery and Suspense (1986). She has also appeared in films, including roles in Doomwatch (1972), Hedda (1975), The Bunker (1981), Scrubbers (1983) and Hitler's SS: Portrait in Evil (1985).

=== EastEnders ===
In 1986, St Clement was cast in her most notable role to date—Pat Wicks, the troublesome former prostitute and former wife of Pete Beale (Peter Dean), in BBC's EastEnders (the show's producers wrote that the marriage had taken place more than 20 years before EastEnders was launched). St Clement's character was originally brought in on a trial basis for a period of three episodes. However the series' executive-producer, Julia Smith, decided to introduce her as a regular character. St Clement initially had reservations about committing to the role, commenting: "I couldn't envisage how this character, who creates absolute havoc everywhere she goes and is not at home with herself or with anybody else in the Square, could possibly fit in". However she was persuaded to continue by Smith, who said: "'We've only seen one layer of the onion skin—the defensiveness—now we'll start to peel away more and get to the vulnerability that lies behind it'." Pat went on to become one of the soap's longest running characters, appearing in 2,183 episodes.

She featured in a multitude of high-profile storylines, which included a total four marriages (two of which had happened before the show's launch) — most notably to Frank Butcher (played by Mike Reid) – numerous affairs, feuds and a spell in prison for drink-driving (which led to a pedestrian dying). In 2006, St Clement signed a £200,000 deal keeping her with EastEnders until at least 2008. As of April 2017, she was the third longest serving cast member at EastEnders surpassed only by Adam Woodyatt and June Brown. In 2012, St Clement won a Lifetime Achievement Award at the British Soap Awards, previously having been won by her co-stars Wendy Richard, June Brown and Barbara Windsor.

In July 2011, it was announced that St Clement would be leaving EastEnders after 25 years. Of her departure St Clement said "I have enjoyed 25 and a half wonderful years in EastEnders creating the character of Pat but feel it's time to hang up her earrings. Leaving the EastEnders 'family' will be akin to a bereavement. But I'm looking forward to the other work and life opportunities that I will have the time to pursue." She filmed her final scenes in November 2011, and the character departed on 1 January 2012. She has since been associated with EastEnders and on 14 November 2014, St Clement reprised the role of Pat for a short stint for Children in Need after Ian Beale (Adam Woodyatt) knocks his head and sees the deceased women in his life. In February 2015, St Clement, alongside Windsor, took part in EastEnders: Back to Ours, which celebrated 30 years of the soap opera. St Clement and Windsor looked back on some of their characters' most infamous moments. On 17 May 2016, she reappeared as Pat, again playing opposite Windsor, for a few minutes as an imagined figure in conversation with the terminally ill Peggy Mitchell. St Clement also appeared at the EastEnders Meet and Greet event in June 2016. And she returned briefly in the pre-Christmas episode of 23 December 2025, in the imagination of Nigel Bates.

=== Other work ===
In 2006, St Clement appeared as Aunt Sponge in The Queen's Handbag at the Children's Party at the Palace – an all-star event to celebrate the Queen's 80th birthday. She has also made personal appearances on various television programmes including Grumpy Old Women (2005–06) and the wildlife programme, Countryfile (2000). She was also the subject of an episode of This Is Your Life in 1995. On 6 March 2012, it was announced that St Clement had joined This Morning as the show's resident animal expert. She made her first appearance on 13 March and her last on 20 December 2012.

In August 2016, it was announced that St Clement would guest appear in the feature-length special episode of Casualty, "Too Old for This Shift", which would air on 27 August 2016. St Clement would appear as "grumpy patient" Sally Hodge who "makes life hell" for charge nurse Charlie Fairhead (Derek Thompson) because she is "distrustful" of him. She reprised the role for one episode in February 2017 after her character was involved in an explosion, one in March 2017 when her character was involved in a traffic accident and one in December 2017 when it was revealed that Sally had been diagnosed with breast cancer.

In November 2017, St Clement appeared on Gone to Pot: American Road Trip in which five celebrities (mainly older aged) go across California and Colorado to find out how cannabis can be used medicinally and how it would affect the UK if it was legalised. She revealed that she smokes cannabis every day for pain relief, and has argued that it should be legalised.

In April 2018 she appeared in an advert for Safeglaze UK, playing two different characters, a posh saleswoman and a Pat Butcher-type character in a leopard print coat, who approves of the saleswoman's mantra, BOGOF (Buy One, Get One Free).

In 2026, St Clement made a cameo appearance in series 2 of Rivals.

=== Charity work ===
St Clement is an animal lover and a keen conservationist. She supports several charities, which includes the Global Wildlife Fund. She is also the Vice-President of her local RSPCA and works with them to promote their "Home for Life" campaign. She has commented "It's a very important campaign to encourage people to mention their pets in their will so that if they die before the animal, the RSPCA have the legal authority to re-home the pet. Without it, pets can end up abandoned or in unsuitable homes. People assume their animals will die first, but you can never be certain. It doesn't cost anything to do and I think it is so important." She is a dog lover and has spent time with PDSA supporters at Crufts, attending PDSA fundraising events and supporting the annual London Animal Day. In 2007, she lent her support to Hearing Dogs for Deaf People and the Pets as Therapy campaign. In February 2007, St Clement, who is a keen horse-rider, became the patron of Veteran Horse Welfare.

== Awards and nominations ==
Year	Award	Category	Nominated work	Character	Result	Ref
2012	The British Soap Awards	Best Single Episode	EastEnders – Pat: An End of an Era	Pat Butcher	Nominated	
2012	The British Soap Awards	Best Exit	EastEnders	Pat Butcher	Nominated	
2012	The British Soap Awards	Lifetime Achievement Award	EastEnders	Pat Butcher	Won	

- Awarded honorary degree from Plymouth University.

== Personal life ==
St Clement is bisexual and is a supporter of gay rights—campaigning with Stonewall against Section 28 and for lowering the age of consent for gay men. St Clement is known to be an intensely private person who seldom speaks about her personal life. In 1967, St Clement married Andrew Gordon - they divorced in 1976. She has no children.

In 1997, St Clement discovered that she had a half-brother, Reginald (born 1934), from her father's first marriage. St Clement has stated that she had been in touch with her father, who died in 1993, aged 84, but he had never mentioned having any other children. Her half brother had barely known their father and had not seen him since he was a toddler.

St Clement has been the focus of much media criticism regarding her weight over the years, which earned her character the nickname "Fat Pat". In 1998 she lost several stone from dieting, which led the media to speculate that she had become ill. She later commented: "I have since decided I wasn't made to be slim. When I was thinner the paparazzi got some pictures where I looked ill. I had to come out and speak about it."

St Clement's autobiography, The End of an Earring, was published in 2015.
