= Weeks (surname) =

- Language: English

Origin
- Meaning: "son of Wikke", "resident of wick, wic, vic"
- Region of origin: South Western England

Other names
- Variant forms: Weekes, Wicks, Weech, Week, Weeke, Wich, Wych, Weetch, Wick, Wickes, Wix, Wike, Witch, Wykes, Whick, and Vik

The name Weeks is an uncommon English surname, usually either a patronymic of the Middle English Wikke ("battle, war") or a topographic or occupational name deriving from Wick ("small, outlying village"). It may also be an Anglification of the Scandinavian habitational name Vik ("small bay, inlet").

== Derivation ==
Weeks is an English surname of Germanic origin with several known derivations:

- A patronymic from the Middle English personal name Wikke, which is in turn a short form of any of various Germanic personal names formed with the element wig, meaning battle, war.
- A variant of Wick, which is an English topographic name for someone who lived in an outlying settlement dependent on a larger village; from the Old English wic an early loan word from the Latin vicus, or a habitational name from a place named with this word. Examples of such places include Week Green in Cornwall, and Wick in Somerset.
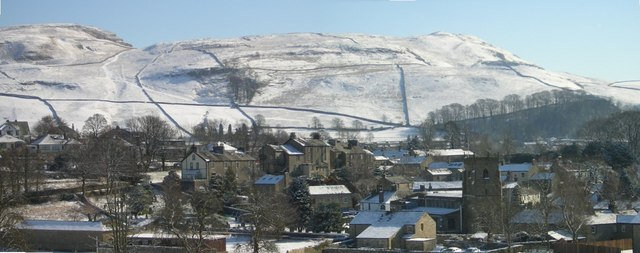
  The village of Giggleswick, England, named for Gikel's dwelling or dairy farm
  As the term was especially used to denote an outlying dairy farm or salt works, it may also have been an occupational name for someone who worked at such a facility. The addition of a final "s" to topographical and locational surnames was a usual medieval practice, denoting one who was resident at a place, rather than from it.
- An Anglification of the Scandinavian Vik, itself either a habitational name from any of the numerous Norwegian or Swedish farmsteads named with Old Norse vík, meaning small bay, inlet, or (in Swedish) a topographic or ornamental name. An example of this is the Scottish Highland town of Wick, (Scots: Week or Weik)
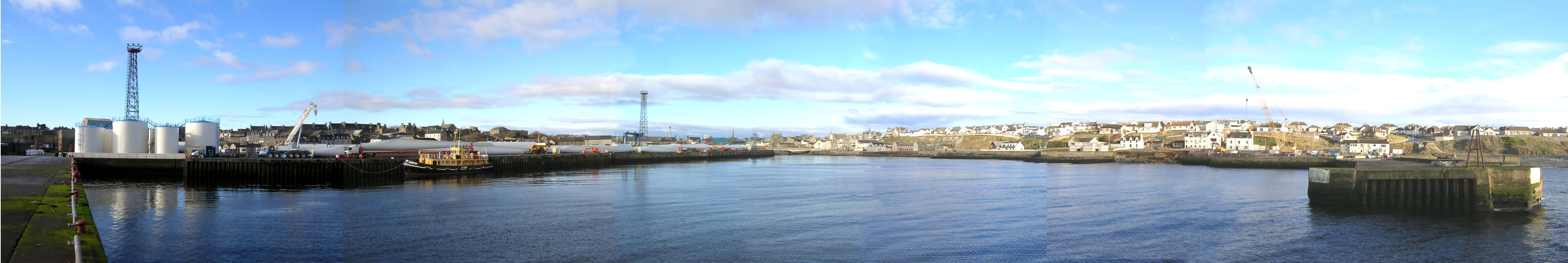
  Wick Bay, Wick, Scotland

== Early instances ==
Early bearers of the surname include:

- Alueredus de Uuica of Somerset in 1084.
- Goscelin del Wich of Worcestershire in 1184.
- Jordan de la Wike of Gloucestershire in 1194.

Later recordings include:

- Symon Weeks, of Devonshire, a worsted weaver born in 1618, who emigrated to Barbados in February 1634 aged only 16. He is currently known to be the first person with the surname Weeks or etymologies of it to travel to the new world thus becoming a common ancestor to many with the name or derivatives of it in North America.
- Benjamin Weich of London, who married Aurrelia Clarke at St James Clerkenwell, on 21 September 1653.
- Henry Witch of London who married Ann Rugrove at St Olaves, Southwark, on 26 June 1774.

== Cognates and variations ==
Names etymologically related to Weeks include but may not be limited to: Weekes, Wicks, Weech, Week, Weeke, Wich, Wych, Weetch, Wick, Wickes, Wix, Wike, Witch, Wykes, Whick, and Vik.

== Frequency and distribution ==
In the UK, at the time of the 1881 Census, the relative frequency of Weeks was highest in Devon (7.3 times the British average), followed by Wiltshire, Somerset, Hampshire, Brecknockshire, Gloucestershire, Monmouthshire, Kent and Dorset.

Today the name is most common (indicated in frequency per million) in Australia (188), the United States (181), the United Kingdom (156), Canada (143), and New Zealand (71).

Globally, the city with the largest numbers of people named Weeks is Bristol, United Kingdom, located in the south western county of Somerset.

In the US, there were 51,976 people in 1990 with the last name Weeks, making it the 675th most common last name. The table below compares this with the corresponding enumerations of related names at that time in the US.

Name	Number
Weeks	51,976
Wicks	12,291
Wick	8,255
Wike	2,629
Wix	2,079
Weekes	1,957
Wyke	917
Wickes	887
Weech	826
Vik	489
Wykes	336

== Notable people with the surname ==
- Alan Weeks (actor) (1948–2015), American actor, singer, dancer, choreographer, and director
- Alan Weeks (sports reporter) (1923–1996), British television sports reporter and commentator
- Bert Weeks (1918–1990), mayor of Windsor, Ontario, Canada, from 1975 to 1982
- Bob Weeks (born 1960), editor of Scoregolf magazine
- Brent Weeks, writer of fantasy books including best-selling The Night Angel trilogy.
- Carl Weeks (1876 - 1962), American cosmetics tycoon.
- Christopher Weeks (born 1987), Chef, American Bassist, African American Descendant of Leonard Weeks
- David Weeks, former Conservative Leader of Westminster City Council
- Don Weeks (1938–2015), longtime host of the WGY Morning News in Schenectady, New York
- Don Weeke (born 1947), American fiber and gourd artist
- Edgar Weeks (1839–1904), military officer, judge and politician from Michigan
- Edwin Lord Weeks (1849–1903), American artist
- Estella Weeks (1886–1969), American researcher
- Ezra Weeks, builder who served as a witness in a sensationalized murder trial
- Frank B. Weeks (1854–1935), American politician
- George Weeks (disambiguation), multiple people
- Harriet Hilreth Weeks (1875–1939), American politician
- Hilary Weeks, singer/songwriter of faith-based music
- Honeysuckle Weeks (born 1979), British actress, best known for her starring role as Samantha Stewart in the British TV series Foyle's War
- James Weeks (disambiguation), multiple people
- Janet Healy Weeks (born 1932), American lawyer and judge
- Jeffrey Weeks, American mathematician and MacArthur Fellow
- Jeffrey Weeks, British historian, sociologist, and gay activist
- Jemile Weeks, Major League Baseball second baseman for the Oakland Athletics, brother of Rickie Weeks
- John Weeks (disambiguation), multiple people
- Joseph Weeks (1773–1845), United States Representative from New Hampshire
- Kent R. Weeks (born 1941), American Egyptologist
- Kermit Weeks (born 1953), aviation enthusiast, owner of very large historic aviation collection and museum
- Kevin Weeks (born 1956), former mobster
- Kyle M. Weeks (died 1955), American politician from Virginia
- Lauren Weeks, American Hyrox athlete
- Laurie Weeks (rugby union), (born 1986), professional rugby union footballer
- Laurie Weeks (writer), writer and performer based in New York City
- Lee Weeks, American comic book artist and penciller
- Lloyd F. Weeks (1932–2002), Michigan politician
- Levi Weeks (1776–1819), the accused in the infamous Manhattan Well Murder trial of 1800
- Lizzie Weeks (1879 – 1976) was an African American activist in Portland, Oregon.
- Miriam Weeks (born 1995) American pornstar
- Orlando Weeks (born 1983), lead singer and guitarist of London-based band The Maccabees
- Perdita Weeks (born 1985), British actress
- Ray Weeks (1930–2015), English cricketer
- Raymond Weeks (1863–1954), American linguist and academic
- Rickie Weeks (born 1982), Major League Baseball second baseman for the Milwaukee Brewers, brother of Jemile Weeks
- Rollo Weeks (born 1987), British actor
- Romilly Weeks (born 1973), English newsreader and journalist
- Russ Weeks (1942–2024), Republican State Senator from West Virginia
- Sinclair Weeks (1893–1972), United States Secretary of Commerce under Dwight Eisenhower
- Steve Weeks (born 1958), retired ice hockey goaltender
- Theophilus Weeks (1708–1772), soldier in the French and Indian War and founder of Swansboro, North Carolina
- Thompson Weeks, Wisconsin politician
- West Weeks (born 2002), American football player
- Whit Weeks (born 2005), American football player
- William Henry Weeks (1864–1936), American architect who designed many public buildings in California
- Willie Weeks (born 1947), American bassist

== See also ==
- Weekes (disambiguation)
- List of people with surname Wicks
- Wick (surname)
- Weekes
- Wicks (disambiguation)
- Weeks (disambiguation)
