= Weeks (disambiguation) =

Weeks is the plural of "week". It can also refer to:

== People ==
- Weeks (surname), including a list of notable people with the surname
- Baron Weeks, a British title held only by Ronald Weeks, 1st Baron Weeks (1890–1960)

=== Fictional characters ===
- Johnny Weeks, a fictional character on the television series The Wire

== Places ==
=== Places in the United States ===
- Weeks, Arkansas, an unincorporated community
- Mount Weeks, a mountain in New Hampshire
- Weeks Falls, a waterfall on the Snoqualmie River, Washington

==== U.S. facilities and structures ====
- Weeks Field, the first airport for Fairbanks, Alaska, from 1923 to 1951
- John W. Weeks Bridge, also known as the Weeks Footbridge or Bridge, a pedestrian bridge over the Charles River, Massachusetts, United States
- Weeks Estate, a country estate in Lancaster, New Hampshire, United States, now the Weeks State Park
- Weeks Cemetery, Marlborough, Massachusetts, United States, on the National Register of Historic Places

== Ships ==
- USS Weeks (DE-285), a United States Navy destroyer escort cancelled in 1944
- USS John W. Weeks, a United States Navy destroyer in commission from 1944 to 1970

== Groups, companies, organizations ==
- Weeks Marine, an American marine construction and dredging contractor
- The Weeks (band), an American indie rock band

== Other uses ==
- Weeks v. United States, a United States Supreme Court case
- Shavuot, also called the Festival of Weeks

== See also ==
- Weeks Act, an American federal law enacted in 1911
- Weeks House (disambiguation)
- Weeks 533, a large floating crane
- Week (disambiguation)
- Weeke
- Weekes (disambiguation)
- Weak (disambiguation)
- Weke
- Wicks (disambiguation)
- Wick (disambiguation)
