= Wicks (surname) =

Wicks is an English surname. Notable people with the surname include:

- Arthur Wicks (1915–2006), English politician
- Ben Wicks (1926–2000), British-Canadian cartoonist, illustrator, journalist and author
- Bob Wicks (born 1950), American football player
- Brian Wicks (born 1940), Australian rules footballer
- Buffy Wicks (born 1977), American politician
- Camilla Wicks (1928–2020), American violinist
- Chad Wicks (born 1978), American wrestler
- Charles E. Wicks (1925–2010), American professor of chemical engineering
- Charles W. Wicks (1862–1931), American businessman and politician
- Chuck Wicks (born 1979), American country music artist and radio personality
- Corrinne Wicks (born 1968), English actress
- Danny Wicks (born 1985), Australian professional rugby league footballer
- Dontayvion Wicks (born 2001), American football player
- Ebba Wicks Brown (née Ebba Lenore Wicks; 1914–2006), American architect
- Eric Wicks (born 1985), American football player
- Frederick Wicks (1840–1910), English author and inventor
- H. M. Wicks (1889–1956), American journalist and politician
- Joe Wicks (born 1985), English fitness coach
- John Wicks (singer) (1953–2018), English record producer and songwriter
- John Wicks (drummer) (born 1971) American drummer and songwriter.
- Jordan Wicks (born 1999), American professional baseball player
- Josh Wicks (born 1983), American soccer player
- Les Wicks (born 1955), Australian poet
- Lucy Wicks, multiple people
- Malcolm Wicks (1947–2012), English politician
- Matt Wicks (born 1978), English footballer
- Nardo Wicks (born 2001), American rapper
- Nigel Wicks (born 1940), British financier
- Pete Wicks (born 1988), English television personality
- Pippa Wicks, British businesswoman
- Sam Wicks, Australian rules footballer
- Sidney Wicks (born 1949), American basketball player
- Stan Wicks (1928–1983), English professional footballer
- Steve Wicks (born 1956), English footballer
- Sue Wicks (born 1966), American basketball player and coach
- Teal Wicks (born 1982), American singer and stage actress
- Terry Wicks (born 1983), Australian Bull Rider, Muay Thai Fighter
- Victoria Wicks (born 1959), English actress

== Fictional characters ==
- EastEnders characters:
  - Brian Wicks (EastEnders)
  - Carly Wicks
  - David Wicks
  - Dean Wicks
  - Jimbo Wicks
  - Joe Wicks
  - Kevin Wicks
  - Lorraine Wicks
  - Pat Wicks
  - Simon Wicks

== See also ==
- Wicks (disambiguation)
- Wickes (disambiguation)
- Weeks (surname)
- Weekes (disambiguation)
- Wix (disambiguation)
- Wick (surname)
