= John Weeks =

John Weeks may refer to:

- John Weeks (bishop) (died 1857), Anglican bishop
- John Weeks (composer) (born 1934), British composer and winner of the 1982 Queen Elisabeth Competition
- John Weeks (economist) (1941–2020), American economist
- John Weeks (painter) (1886–1965), New Zealand painter
- John D. Weeks, American chemist
- John E. Weeks (1853–1949), U.S. Representative from Vermont, and Governor of Vermont
- John W. Weeks (1860–1926), U.S. Senator from Massachusetts and Secretary of War
- John W. Weeks (New Hampshire politician) (1781–1853), U.S. Representative from New Hampshire
- John H. Weeks, American soldier and Medal of Honor recipient

== See also ==
- Jon Weeks (born 1986), American football player
- Johnny Weeks, a fictional character on the television series The Wire
- John Meeks (1839–1899), English-born Australian politician
