= Episode 6994 =

2024 episode of EastEnders

- EastEnders episode
- Episode no.: Episode 6994
- Directed by: Mickey Jones
- Written by: Simon Ashdown
- Original air date: 10 October 2024
- Running time: 29 minutes

Guest appearances
- Michael French as David Wicks; Paul Nicholls as Joe Wicks; Chloe Marshall as Holly

Episode chronology
← Previous; Episode 6993	Next → Episode 6995

Episode 6994 of the British soap opera EastEnders aired on 10 October 2024. It was originally released on BBC iPlayer and released on BBC One later that day. The episode revolved around the aftermath of David Wicks (Michael French) finding out about Cindy Beale's (Michelle Collins) affair with Junior Knight (Micah Balfour), leading to Cindy and David revisiting and discussing their past. The episode also sees Junior ask his father, George Knight (Colin Salmon), for relationship advice. The episode ends on a cliffhanger where it is revealed that Cindy's admission that she is having an affair with Junior and that she is still in love with George has been recorded.

This was the final episode in French's week-long guest stint as David, with the episode further exploring David's relationships with Cindy and his daughter Bianca Jackson (Patsy Palmer). Both Collins and Palmer were happy to work with French again. In addition to David's departure, the episode also marked the cameo return of David's son Joe Wicks (Paul Nicholls), which was not announced prior to the broadcast, and the brief appearance of Joe's daughter Holly (Chloe Marshall). Joe's surprise return was well-received by viewers and critics, who had speculated that he may return due to having been mentioned in previous episodes.

== Plot ==
After catching Cindy Beale (Michelle Collins) cheat on her fiancé Ian Beale (Adam Woodyatt) with Junior Knight (Micah Balfour), David Wicks (Michael French), Ian's half-brother and Cindy's former lover, intends to tell Ian. Cindy begs him not to, not wanting to lose her family and security, so David agrees to hear Cindy out. Cindy takes David to Beale's Eels, Walford's Pie and Mash shop, where her daughter Anna Knight (Molly Rainford) and Freddie Slater (Bobby Brazier) are working on their recording of the birds they have been watching. Cindy asks them to leave so she can speak to David alone and they leave the bird recorder in the shop. Cindy tells David that she has gotten engaged to Ian as she wants their relationship to work, and she hits out at David for having sex with her and then leaving her in the 1990s whilst she was married to Ian. She tells David that she fell in love with him and that he broke the hearts of other women and abandoned his children Joe Wicks (Paul Nicholls) and Bianca Jackson (Patsy Palmer): Cindy also accuses him of Double standard and ruining people's lives. Cindy slaps David when he accuses her of not caring about the deaths of two of her children, Lucy (Hetti Bywater) and Steven Beale (Aaron Sidwell), when she was in witness protection.

Meanwhile, Junior confides in his dad father and Cindy's ex-husband, George Knight (Colin Salmon), about his feelings for Cindy, though he does not reveal her identity. Junior explains that he now really cares for this woman and believes that she feels the same way. Whilst George does not want Junior to hurt anyone, he believes that he should go for the woman if they both share the same feelings. Ian's mother, Kathy Beale (Gillian Taylforth) urges Ian to move on from his grudge towards David. Cindy tells David that she does not love Junior but needs passion in her life. Cindy and David talk about their past romance, and Cindy reveals that it was painful for her as she was in love with David. She also tells David off for abandoning her and not being there for her. David and Cindy wonder if they could have had a future together, and David suggests that they try again, which Cindy dismisses as ridiculous. David then receives another text message from "Holly". Cindy then admits that she is still in love with George.

David tells Cindy that she needs to make a decision between Junior and Ian and goes to tell Ian, despite Cindy begging him not. However, before he can say anything, Ian tells David that he wants to move on and forgive him. Surprised by this, David decides to not tell Ian and wishes him well. Cindy tells David that she once loved him, and the pair share a kiss. Cindy then tells Junior that their affair can no longer continue, which upsets him. Following Cindy's encouragement to not leave Bianca, David then offers his daughter to join him in his trip to Northern England so that he can look after her and introduce her to someone. Bianca rejects the offer, wanting to stay in Walford to support her incarcerated half-sister Sonia Fowler (Natalie Cassidy), but the pair promise to stay in touch. Just as David is about to leave Walford, he answers a video call request from Holly (Chloe Marshall), who is happy that David is coming to see her graduate. Holly's father and David's son, Joe, then joins the call. The three express their excitement to see each other and David then leaves to join them. The final scene reveals that the recorder is still switched on, suggesting that it has recorded David and Cindy's conversation.

== Production and release ==
Spoilers for this episode from Digital Spy reported that Cindy Beale (Michelle Collins) would face a "difficult time" and be forced to "juggle several tricky situations". It was also reported that Cindy's fiancé, Ian Beale (Adam Woodyatt), would look to the "future". The episode is set during Cindy and Ian's engagement party, which had started the prior episode. The episode was released at 6am on BBC iPlayer on 10 October 2024, and aired on BBC One at 7:30pm that same day.

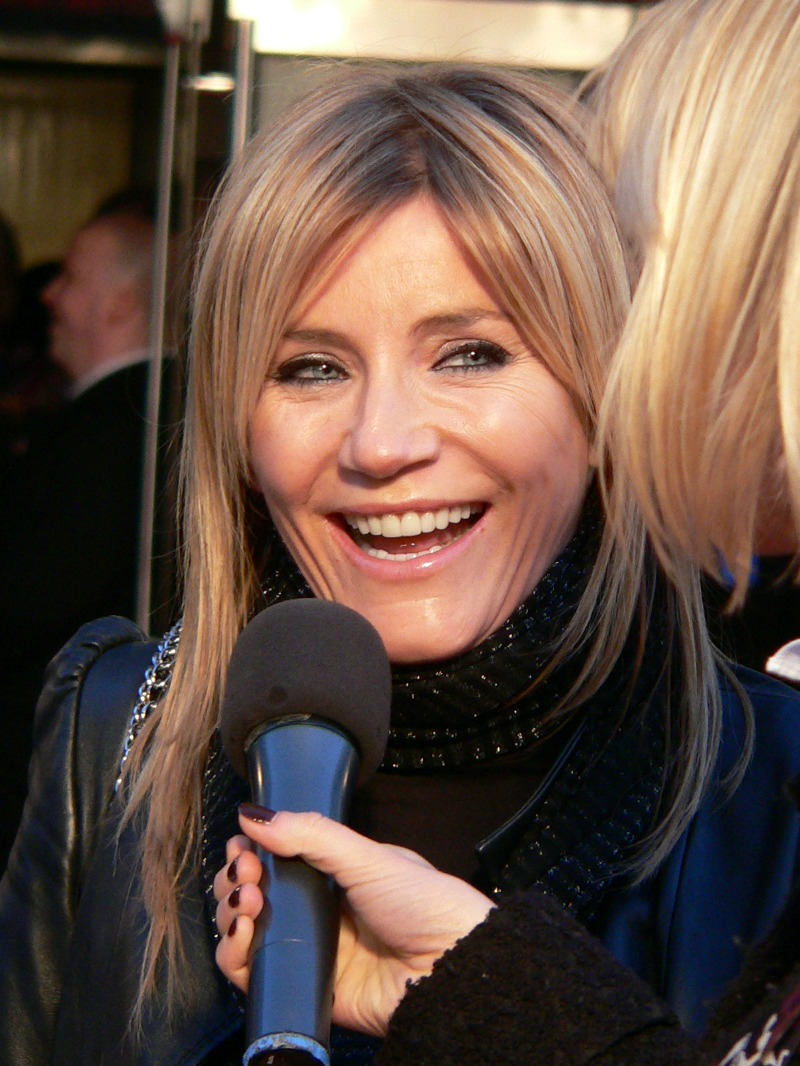
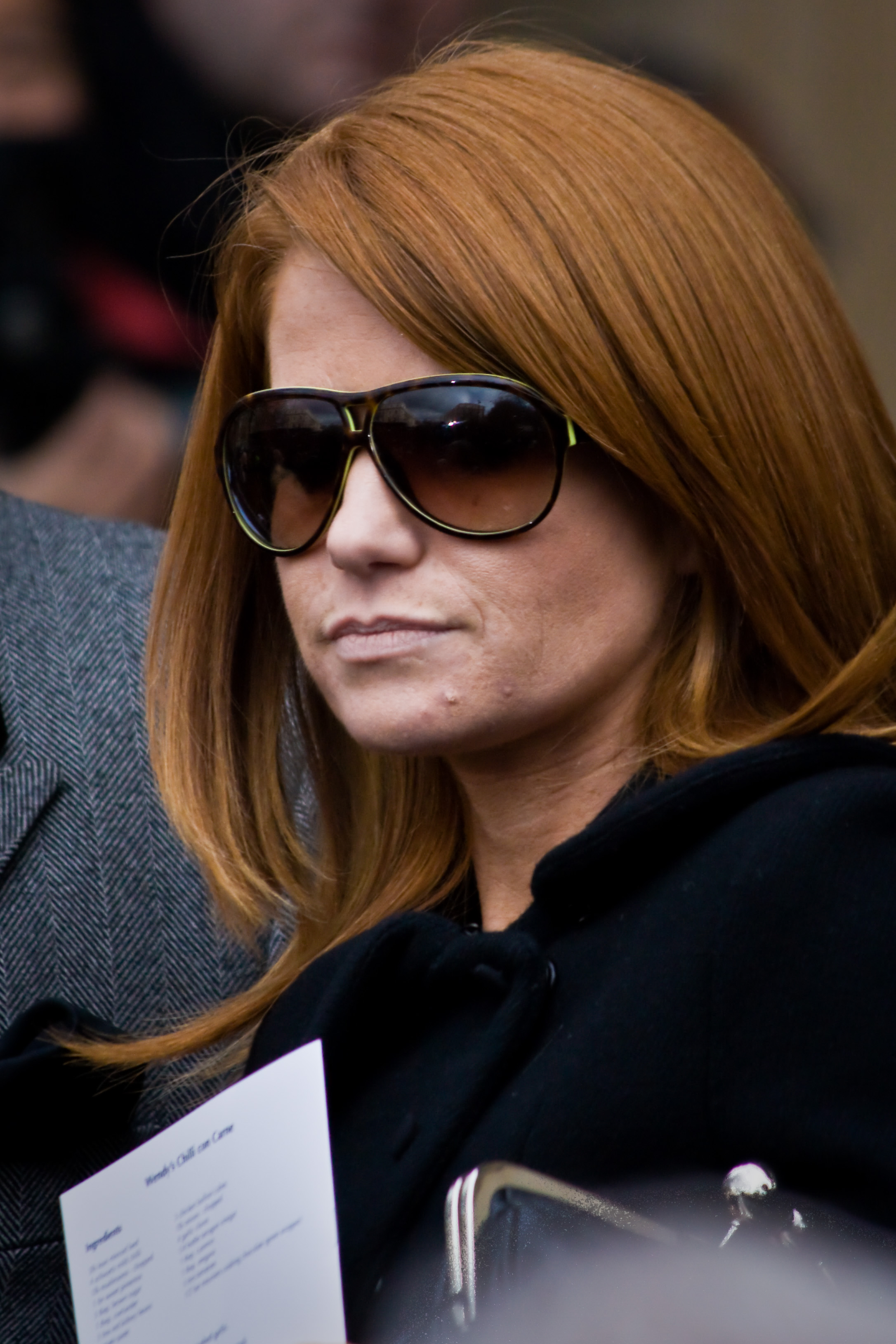
Michelle Collins (left) and Patsy Palmer (right) both said they enjoyed working with Michael French again.

The episode marked the final episode of the guest stint of Michael French as David Wicks, who had returned to the show for a guest stint a week prior. This episode, alongside the previous other episodes that had aired that week, revisited Cindy and David's affair from the 1990s, as the pair had come face-to-face for the first time in 27 years two episodes previously. David's return led to a situation where four of Cindy's love interests were in the episode: her fiancé Ian, her ex-husband George, her lover Junior and her ex-lover David.

The episode also further explored the dynamic between David and his daughter, Bianca Jackson (Patsy Palmer), which had also been a key aspect of David's return stint. The end of the episode featured David offering for Bianca to join him in his travel, and although she rejects the offer, the pair part on good terms. Palmer told Inside Soap that she was happy that the soap was exploring a "new era" of their father-daughter relationship, calling it an "amazing chance" to see how a "woman in her 40s and a man in his 60s navigate the situation that they are in".

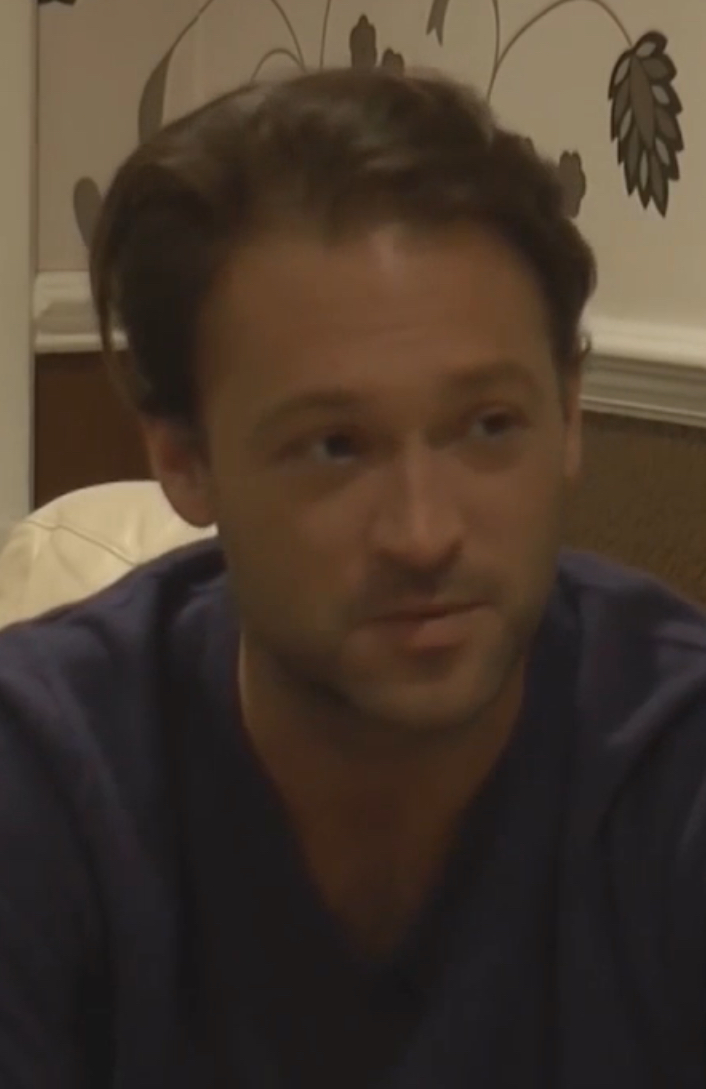
Paul Nicholls (pictured) made an unannounced cameo in the episode.

The end of the episode featured a cameo return of Paul Nicholls as Joe Wicks, who had previously appeared as a regular character from 1996 to 1997. His brief return was kept a surprise until the transmission of the episode. In the episode, David answers a video call from Holly (Chloe Marshall), Joe's daughter, and David speaks to the pair of them, who are excited to see David again. Prior to Joe's return, he had been mentioned several times in the preceding episodes. David and Bianca had also referenced Joe's Schizophrenia storyline from his previous stint when David compared it to Bianca's mental health struggles, particularly when David noted how Bianca struggled to let things go, which Joe as struggled to do in his original stint. David is seeing leaving Albert Square to travel to Joe and Holly, marking French's departure from the soap.

The end of the episode also featured a cliffhanger teasing that Cindy and Junior's affair could be exposed. During the episode, David confronted Cindy about her affair with Junior and she revealed that she was still in love with Junior's father, George, and that she sometimes pictured him in bed when she has sex with his son. The end of the episode featured the camera panning down to Freddie Slater (Bobby Brazier)'s bird microphone recorder that he had left behind, which appeared to have recorded Cindy and David's conversation.

== Reception ==
"Just when we thought EastEnders couldn't make [David's] return any more iconic, the BBC soap aired a last-minute cameo that long-term viewers are sure to love".

—Laura Denby on Joe's return (2024)

Laura-Jayne Tyler from Inside Soap named David's return as the highlight of British soap operas in that week, praising how he had "slotted back". Tyler also praised Joe's return, writing, "The name Joe Wicks will mean something else entirely to today's audience. But for those of us who grew up watching 90s EastEnders, our cup runneth over!" Daniel Kilkelly from Digital Spy called David's phone call with Holly and Joe "heartwarming" and Joe's return a "surprise". His colleague, Harriet Mitchell, called the episode's cliffhanger "huge".

Laura Denby from Radio Times called Joe's return a "joyous twist". She added that "it looks like David has another chance to bond with Joe. With all the chaos and drama in EastEnders, this was a very welcome sprinkling of delight for soap fans". She termed the cameo "a heartwarming twist to end another action-packed week in EastEnders". Denby also believed that Cindy and David's conversation was a "ticking timebomb" just "waiting to be rumbled!"

Charlotte Tutton from the Daily Mirror and Dan Laurie from Manchester Evening News had previously speculated that EastEnders were "teasing" a return for Joe due to David mentioning him and due to viewers speculating that Holly's identity could be linked to him. Daniel Bird from the Daily Mirror wrote how fans were "stunned" over Joe's surprise cameo, calling it an "on-screen bombshell", a "major" cliffhanger and the "shocking" return of an "iconic" character. Bird also noted how viewers were "glued" when David introduced them to Holly. He also added that David's return had seen "some feathers rattled" when he "passionately" kissed Cindy. Calli Kitson from Metro believed that episode had shocked "everyone" by the "huge twist" of bringing back Joe.
