= Charles Weeks =

Charles Weeks may refer to:

- Charles H. Weeks (c. 1837–?), American sailor and Medal of Honor recipient
- Charles Sinclair Weeks (1893–1972), American politician, U.S. senator from Massachusetts
- Charles Peter Weeks (1870–1928), American architect with Weeks and Day

== See also ==
- Charles M. Weeks House, a historic home in Huntington, Suffolk County, New York.
