= Week (disambiguation) =

A week is a time unit equal to seven days.

Week may also refer to:

- "Week" (Chungha song), a 2017 song by Chungha
- "Week" (Do As Infinity song), a 2001 song by Do As Infinity
- Week, Devon, a village in England
- Week St Mary, Cornwall, a village in England
- The Week (disambiguation), several magazines and newspapers

WEEK may refer to:

- WEEK-TV, a television station licensed to Peoria, Illinois, United States
  - WEEK-DT2, a digital subchannel service of WEEK-TV
  - WEEK-DT3, a digital subchannel service of WEEK-TV
- WOAM, an AM radio station licensed to Peoria, Illinois, United States, which held the call sign WEEK until 1960
- WPIA, an FM radio station licensed to Eureka, Illinois, United States, which held the call sign WEEK-FM from 1997 to 1999

== See also ==
- One Week (disambiguation)
- Weeks (disambiguation)
- Weekly (disambiguation)
