= Lorraine Wicks =

Fictional character from EastEnders

- EastEnders character
- Portrayed by: Jacqueline Leonard
- Duration: 1996–1997
- First appearance: Episode 1271; 2 April 1996
- Last appearance: Episode 1532; 14 November 1997
- Introduced by: Corinne Hollingworth
In-universe information
- Occupation: Barmaid
- Mother: Hazel Foster
- Husband: David Wicks (backstory)
- Sons: Joe Wicks
- Daughters: Karen Wicks
- Stepdaughters: Bianca Jackson
- Granddaughters: Holly

Lorraine Wicks is a fictional character from the British BBC soap opera EastEnders, played by Jacqueline Leonard between 2 April 1996 and 14 November 1997.

== Creation and development ==
Introduced in April 1996, Lorraine is the former wife of the already established character David Wicks (Michael French). She is brought into the serial along with her son Joe Wicks (Paul Nicholls). Author Kate Lock has described Lorraine as "relentlessly sensible, fair and nice" but with a "rogue gene" that prompted her to select the wrong kind of men.

As well as a high-profile storyline concentrating on Joe's diagnosis of schizophrenia, Lorraine's most prominent storyline is a love triangle between herself, Grant Mitchell (Ross Kemp) and Grant's wife Tiffany Mitchell (Martine McCutcheon). In the storyline, Lorraine discovers that Tiffany is keeping a secret from Grant – that he is potentially not the father of her unborn child. When Tiffany refuses to tell Grant the truth, Lorraine does, making way for them to become a legitimate couple, albeit briefly. Leonard commented in December 1996, "Lorraine has had a year on her own and she feels that she probably needs a bit of contact - and Grant's quite macho. It was very interesting from my point of view because Lorraine could be perceived as being bitchy and she's not. She genuinely cares about Tiffany and their marriage and the baby and she wants the whole situation sorted out. But she and Grant do like each other and care about each other and it loses control a bit." Lock has questioned why Lorraine would have fallen for Grant, suggesting that "Perhaps she thought she could change him". Ultimately though the differences between the couple took their toll. As Lock surmises, "[Grant] did really make an effort to be restrained, but maintaining this façade was beyond him and, after seeing Grant shake her son so hard that his teeth rattled, Lorraine called the whole thing off."

Leonard decided to leave EastEnders in 1997 to nurse her mother through poor health. She has since commented, "my mum was very poorly at the time and I had that to contend with. After a year and a half in the Square, I just thought it was time for me to go. Paul Nicholls, who played Joe, was leaving and it was the natural progression if you like. The schizophrenia storyline was dragging on and there was nowhere else to go with the character. I could have stayed and took the money I suppose, but I just needed the change. I'm glad I took time out." In the serial Lorraine returns to her home town of Bolton with her son Joe and her former partner Peter, making her on-screen exit in November 1997.

When discussing the role in 2000, Leonard said, "They didn't kill us off and the part was left open, but sadly it's too late to go back now. Besides, none of the characters that could link Lorraine back to Albert Square are there any more. I had to go, though. It was a difficult decision but I felt I'd done all I could with the role." However, she did not rule out the possibility of returning, saying, "I think it would be difficult but yes, if the opportunity arose then I would love to go back for a little while. Not forever, just a little while to say hello."

== Storylines ==
Lorraine first arrives in Albert Square in April 1996 when she comes in search of her son, Joe (Paul Nicholls), who had run away from their home in Bolton with the hope of reuniting with his estranged father, David Wicks (Michael French). Lorraine's marriage to David had been a disaster, ruined by David's numerous infidelities. He had abandoned his wife and two children (Karen and Joe) almost eight years prior to Joe's re-appearance, and he had subsequently played no part in any of their lives. David isn't exactly thrilled to see his son, whose overt display of emotion leaves him feeling decidedly uncomfortable. Lorraine is even less happy to be reunited with her ex-husband. She and Joe had been through a turbulent time since his departure. Her daughter Karen had been killed in a car accident and Joe blames himself for her death because he had swapped seats with her moments before the fatal crash. Upon hearing of Karen's death, David becomes wracked with guilt about abandoning his children, but it still doesn't evoke any parental feelings in him towards his son, and he is relieved when Lorraine manages to persuade Joe to return to Bolton. Joe, however, is not easily put off, and he returns to Walford in May, determined to rebuild a relationship with his father; in order to keep him happy Lorraine moves there with him.

Lorraine gets a job as a barmaid in The Queen Victoria public house, and it isn't long before she catches the eye of both Grant Mitchell (Ross Kemp) and his friend Nigel Bates (Paul Bradley). Nigel pursues Lorraine, but although she likes him, she is never interested in anything more than friendship. Grant is different, and the two start a relationship, which results in him throwing his wife Tiffany (Martine McCutcheon) out when she is six months pregnant with his child.

Grant is infatuated with Lorraine and even proposes to her, but Lorraine is forced to put their relationship on the back-burner after her son Joe has a mental breakdown. Joe's behaviour towards his mother becomes extremely hostile and he also starts to develop severe paranoia; even thinking that Grant is the devil and is attempting to poison him. Grant, never the diplomat, decides to counter Joe's accusation by literally trying to shake some sense into him. However, his outburst is witnessed by Lorraine, who promptly ends their relationship.

Joe's mental status only worsens after his father runs out on him for a second time. Lorraine becomes desperate, but her attempts at getting Joe professional help do nothing to help matters. Joe eventually becomes so fearful of the outside world that he refuses to leave his flat and this culminates in him holding Lorraine hostage one night, dowsing himself in petrol and threatening to kill himself or anyone that comes near him. Grant manages to rescue Lorraine, but Joe is sectioned as a result and later diagnosed as suffering from schizophrenia.

Joe is later released, and with his condition stabilised he begins to live a normal life. He makes a trip to Bolton and is instrumental in reuniting Lorraine with her ex-boyfriend Peter (Mark McKenna). Peter had been driving the car at the time of the crash that killed Lorraine's daughter and this had led to their eventual breakup. Upon reconciling with Peter, Lorraine decides to go back to Bolton in November 1997.

== Reception ==
Leonard says that viewers of the soap warmed to the character as she was depicted as a "caring mum". She claims she received a lot of fan mail from fans, mostly children, who wanted their mum to be like Lorraine.
