= Osvaldo Coluccino =

Italian composer and poet

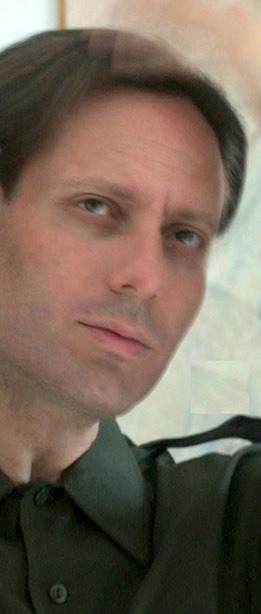
Osvaldo Coluccino

Osvaldo Coluccino (born Domodossola, 22 April 1963) is an Italian composer and poet.

== Biography ==
His music has been performed in some of the major festivals of classical and contemporary classical music, by prestigious soloistes, conductors, orchestras and ensembles such as Balthasar-Neumann-Chor of Hamburg conducted by Lionel Sow (Director of the Chœur de Radio France and, previously, of the Maîtrise Notre Dame de Paris), Ensemble Recherche of Freiburg, Germany, Nieuw Ensemble of Amsterdam conducted by Ed Spaanjard, Stadler Quartett of Salzburg, Exaudi Vocal Ensemble of London conducted by James Weeks…, and has been broadcast by national radio stations such as SWR, Radio France France Musique, ORF, Rai Radio 3, BR-Klassik, Kulturradio RBB (Rundfunk Berlin-Brandenburg), Concertzender, RTBF Musiq 3, Klara, Vlaamse Radio- en Televisieomroep VRT, RTP Rádio e Televisão de Portugal Antena 2. He has received commissions by Gran Teatro La Fenice di Venezia, Biennale di Venezia, Milano Musica – Teatro alla Scala, RAI National Symphony Orchestra, Transit Festival Leuven, Muziekcentrum De Bijloke Ghent, Conservatoire royal de Bruxelles and others. Some of the major labels for contemporary classical music (Kairos, Neos, Col legno, Stradivarius, Another Timbre...) have released some monographic discs, while some scores are published by RAI Trade editions. It was the music historian Luigi Pestalozza who discovered him as a composer, and the musicologists who wrote about him include, in Italy, Angela Ida De Benedictis (in Edizioni del Teatro alla Scala), Angelo Foletto (la Repubblica), Mario Gamba (il Manifesto), Mario Messinis (Il Gazzettino), Paolo Petazzi (Classic Voice and Takte-Bärenreiter), in Europe Reinhard Ermen (MusikTexte, Cologne), Pierre Rigaudière (Diapason, Paris), Liam Cagney and Richard Whitehouse (Gramophone, London), Ismael Cabral (Scherzo, Madrid), Dirk Wieschollek (NMZ, Hamburg), Daniel Ender (ÖMZ, Vienna)…

He has been engaged in an intense poetry activity from 1986 to 2003. Discovered by Stefano Agosti, one of the most eminent literary critics of the twentieth century in Italy, his poems and prose have been published in monographic books, prestigious literary magazines such as Il Verri and anthologies. He has also published artist books consisting of his poems and original works of art by renowned artists (see below in “Poetry”).

== Discography ==
- Quale velo (2001), in [“various composers”] Crossroads, Monesis Ensemble, conductor Flavio Emilio Scogna, VDM, Rome 2008
- Voce d’orlo (2004-2007), Algoritmo Ensemble, conductor Marco Angius, introduction by Paolo Petazzi, RAI Trade, Rome-Milan 2009
- Neuma q (2006), electroacoustic music, Die Schachtel, Milan 2010
- Gemina (2002-2008), chamber music, various performers, Due Punte Classica, 2010
- Atto (2011), music for acoustic objects, Another Timbre, Sheffield 2012
- Stanze (2004-2011), Alfonso Alberti piano, Col legno, Vienna 2012
- String Quartets (2002-2008), Quartetto d'Archi del Teatro La Fenice (with the participation of Achille Gallo), Neos, Munich 2012
- Oltreorme (2012), music for acoustic objects, Another Timbre, Sheffield 2013
- Parallelo (2007-2009), electroacoustic music, Unfathomless, Bruxelles 2015
- Dimensioni (1997-2007), electroacoustic music, Die Schachtel, Milan 2015
- Emblema (2009-2015), chamber music, Ex Novo Ensemble, Kairos, Vienna 2018
- Interni (2017-2018), music for flute, Roberto Fabbriciani, Kairos, Vienna 2019
- Absum (1999), electroacoustic music, Inexhaustible Editions, ljubljana 2021
- Prima stanza (2004), in [“various composers”] Notturni, Ilaria Baldaccini piano, EMA Vinci Records, Florence 2021
- Rispecchiato in quarzo (2020-2023), solo instrument and electronics, Jan Michiels piano, Carl Rosman contrabass clarinet, Daniel Agi bass flute, Kairos, Vienna 2025
- Diade (2002-2011), mixed duets, soloists from Orchestra Sinfonica Nazionale della Rai, Quartetto d'Archi di Torino, Dedalo Ensemble and others, Stradivarius, Milan 2025

== Selected works ==
=== Vocal music ===
- Nel distacco (2003), for 8 voices, on poems by O. Coluccino. We remember the performance by Balthasar-Neumann-Chor conducted by Lionel Sow
- Senza smuovere la brezza (2005), for 8 voices, on poem by O. Coluccino. World premiere Balthasar-Neumann-Chor conducted by Lionel Sow
- Il primo luogo (2006), for 4 female voices, on poem by Osvaldo Coluccino
- Afea (2006), for soprano, clarinet and percussions, on poem by Osvaldo Coluccino
- Scomparsa (2007), for 6 voices, on theatrical text by Osvaldo Coluccino. World premiere Exaudi Vocal Ensemble conducted by James Weeks, London, Milton Court Concert Hall, Guildhall School of Music and Drama
- Il viaggio di ritorno (2013), for 5 voices, on poems by Osvaldo Coluccino

=== Orchestral music and for large ensemble ===
- Archeo (2003-2004), for orchestra. World premiere by RAI National Symphony Orchestra at Auditorium RAI Arturo Toscanini in Turin
- Onda, spora – Atopica (2003), for 9 instruments. RAI Trade editions, Commissioned by RAI National Symphony Orchestra
- Out of the oasis (2005), for 10 strings. RAI Trade editions
- Gamete stele (2007), for 9 instruments. RAI Trade ed. Commissioned by Biennale di Venezia and Compagnia per la Musica in Roma
- Emblema 2 (2009-2012), for 12 instruments. Commissioned by Orchestra della Toscana, Florence
- Fissità, aria (2013), for 13 instruments. Commissioned by Gli Amici di Musica/Realtà, Milan
- Destato nel respiro (2018), for 14 instruments. Commissioned by Festival Angelica (with Orchestra del Teatro Comunale di Bologna), Bologna

=== Chamber music ===
- Aion (2002) RAI Trade ed. and Attimo (2007), for string quartet. World premiere of Aion by Stadler Quartett, at WØD-Weinberg Festival, Orchesterhaus of Mozarteum Orchestra Salzburg, in Salzburg
- Diade (2002-2011), 11 mixed duets
- Voce d'orlo (2004-2008), 6 pieces of chamber music RAI Trade ed.
- Stanze (2004-2011), 12 pieces for piano
- Emblema (2009-2015), 6 pieces of chamber music
- Interni (2017-2018), 6 pieces for flute. World premiere by Roberto Fabbriciani in Florence at Maggio Musicale Fiorentino
- Rispecchiato in quarzo (2020-2023) 3 pieces for solo instrument and electronics. World premiere of the first piece by Jan Michiels at Transit in Leuven and at De Bijloke in Ghent

=== Electroacoustic music and for acoustic objects ===
- Dimensioni (1997-2007), 9 pieces
- Absum (1999), 6 pieces
- Neuma q (2006), 4 pieces. World premiere Goethe-Institut Rom and Museo Egizio
- Parallelo (2007-2009), 2 pieces
- Atto (2011), 5 pieces for acoustic objects
- Oltreorme (2012), 4 pieces for acoustic objects

== Poetry ==
- Strumenti d’uso comune, introduction by Stefano Agosti, Campanotto, Udine 1994
- Quelle volte spontanee, critical note by Giuliano Gramigna, publication for winning of “Lorenzo Montano Prize for Poetry”, Anterem, Verona 1996
- Appuntamento, afterword by Giorgio Luzzi, original etching by Francesco Franco, Anterem, Verona, 2001
- Gamete, afterword by Gilberto Isella, cover by Giulio Paolini, Coup d'Idée Art Editions, Turin 2014. ISBN 978-88-908853-2-7
- Scomparsa, tragedies in verse, Puntoacapo Editions, Pasturana 2020. ISBN 978-88-6679-273-4
- Cieli d’assenzio, poems, introduction by Giovanni Tesio, Carabba Editore, Lanciano 2023. ISBN 978-88-6344-718-7
- L'abbaglio del volatile, prose and stories, Carabba Editore, Lanciano 2024. ISBN 978-88-6344-753-8
- Artist books – some of which were presented or exhibited at the Turin Civic Gallery of Modern and Contemporary Art, Accademia di Belle Arti di Firenze, Museo d'Arte Moderna di Bologna, at the Palazzo dei Musei, Modena (Poletti Civic Library of Art and Architecture with University of Bologna at Festival Filosofia of Modena), at Rivoli Museum of Contemporary Art, Castle of Rivoli, at Museo d'Arte Contemporanea Donnaregina (Museo Madre) in Naples, at Pinacoteca Comunale, Città di Castello, Swiss National Library… – include Appuntamento with illustrations by Marco Gastini, design by Franco Mello, preface by Stefano Agosti, Coup d'Idée art editions, Turin 2010; Manto with works of art by Franco Guerzoni, Rodriguez Editore, Pescara 2021; a collection of three books, i.e. Quale leggerezza with works of art by Tommaso Cascella, Essenze, assenze with works by Giulia Napoleone, Diktaion, with works of art by Bruno Ceccobelli, Rodriguez Editore, Pescara 2022; Canto del risveglio with works by Alfonso Filieri, Archivio Orolontano, Rome 2022; Ai piedi degli alberi, with works by Giulia Napoleone, Stamperia d'Arte Il Bulino, Rome 2023; with the artist Giulia Napoleone he has also published the books Fontana, Pulcinoelefante edition, Osnago 2022, and Una eco, Il ragazzo innocuo edition, Milan 2022
