= Wick =

Wick most often refers to:

- Capillary action ("wicking")
  - Candle wick, the cord used in a candle or oil lamp
  - Solder wick, a copper-braided wire used to desolder electronic contacts

Wick, WICK, or -wick may also refer to:

== Mathematics, science, and technology ==
- Wick product, in probability theory
- Wick rotation, in physics
- Static wick on aircraft that discharges triboelectricity

== Places and placenames ==
- -wick/-wich town, settlements in Anglo-Saxon England
- vicus, the Latin word from which the Anglo-Saxon -wick, -wich, wic and -wych found within placenames derive.
- -wick, from Old Norse vik, bay or inlet, as in Wick, Caithness, and Lerwick

=== Scotland ===
- Wick, Caithness
  - Wick Airport
  - Wick (Parliament of Scotland constituency) (to 1707)
  - Wick River, Caithness

=== England ===
- Wick, Bournemouth, Dorset
- Wick, Devizes, Wiltshire
- Wick, Downton, Wiltshire
- Wick, Gloucestershire
- Wick, West Sussex
- Wick, Worcestershire
- Wick St. Lawrence, Somerset
- Hackney Wick, London
- Hampton Wick, London
- Wick (ward), an electoral ward of the Hackney London Borough Council

=== Wales ===
- Wick, Vale of Glamorgan

=== United States ===
- Wick, Ohio
- Wick, West Virginia

== Business, media, and arts ==
- Wick, or shadow, as an aspect of the Candlestick chart in stock trading
- Wick Communications (formerly Wick Newspaper Group)
- WICK, Pennsylvania AM broadcasting station
- Wick (album), by Nardo Wick, 2025
- "Wick", a 2025 single by Silent Planet

== Other uses ==
- The Wick, house in Richmond Hill, London, England
- Wick (hieroglyph), Ancient Egyptian sign
- "Wick", nickname for (private) Chadwick School in Los Angeles
- Wick (surname)

== See also ==
- John Wick (disambiguation)
- WIC (disambiguation)
- Wick House (disambiguation)
- Wicked (disambiguation)
- Wicking (disambiguation)
- Wicks (disambiguation)
- Wyck (disambiguation)
- Vik (disambiguation)
- Weeks (surname)
