= John Wicks =

John Wicks may refer to:

- John Wicks (singer), singer and songwriter with the UK band The Records
- John Wicks (drummer), American studio session drummer
- Johnny Lee Wicks (died 2010), perpetrator of the 2010 Las Vegas courthouse shooting
- John F. Wick, organist and founder of the Wicks Organ Company

== See also ==
- Jan Wyck, or Wick, Dutch baroque painter
- John Wick (disambiguation)
- Wicks (disambiguation)
