= Once a Week =

Once a Week may refer to:

- Once a Week (magazine), a nineteenth century British magazine
- Once a Week (book) (1914), a collection of short stories by A. A. Milne
- Once a Week (film), a 1942 Italian comedy film
- "Once a Week Won't Kill You" (1944), a short story by J. D. Salinger
- The Once a Week Show (2007–2008), an Irish television series presented by Dustin the Turkey
- Collier's, an American magazine originally titled Once a Week

== See also ==
- One Week (disambiguation)
- Weekly (disambiguation)
