= Wix (name) =

Wix is both an English surname and a given name. Notable people with the name include:

- Don Wix (born 1946), American politician
- Edward Wix (1802–1866), British Anglican archdeacon
- Florence Wix (1883–1956), English-born American actress
- Henry Otto Wix (1866–1922), German-born American painter
- Katy Wix (born 1980), British actress
- Samuel Wix (1771–1861), English cleric and controversialist
- Wix Garner (1897–1978), American college football coach

== See also ==
- Paul "Wix" Wickens (born 1956), English keyboardist
- Wix (disambiguation)
- Wicks (surname)
