= Weeks House =

Weeks House may refer to:

in the United States (by state then city)

- Weeks House (Brooksville, Florida)
- Weeks–Kimbrough House, Talbotton, Talbot County, Georgia
- Barzillai Weeks House, Barnstable, Barnstable County, Massachusetts
- Kotthoff-Weeks Farm Complex, Hermann, Gasconade County, Missouri
- Weeks House (Greenland, New Hampshire), Rockingham County
- Weeks Estate, Lancaster, Coos County, New Hampshire
- Charles M. Weeks House, Huntington, Suffolk County, New York
- Weeks House, on the National Register of Historic Places listings in Wichita County, Texas
- Charles H. Weeks House, Salt Lake City, Utah
- John C. Weeks House (better known as the Whittemore House (Washington, D.C.))
