= Wickes (surname) =

Wickes is a surname. Notable people with the surname include:

- Alan Wickes (born 1939), Australian rules football player and administrator
- Craig Wickes (born 1962), New Zealand rugby player
- Eliphalet Wickes (1769–1850), American politician
- Frances G. Wickes (born 1875–1967), American psychologist
- George Wickes (1698–1761), English silversmith
- Joseph A. Wickes (1826–1915), American politician and judge
- Lambert Wickes (1735–1777), Continental Navy captain
- Mary Wickes (1910–1995), American film and television actress
- Richard Wickes (died 1776), Continental Navy officer, brother of Lambert Wickes

== See also ==
- Wicks (surname)
