= David Wicks =

Fictional character from EastEnders

- EastEnders character
- Portrayed by: Michael French
- Duration: 1993–1996, 2012–2014, 2024
- First appearance: Episode 928; 23 December 1993
- Last appearance: Episode 6994 10 October 2024
- Introduced by: Leonard Lewis (1993); Bryan Kirkwood (2012); Lorraine Newman (2013); Chris Clenshaw (2024)
In-universe information
- Occupation: Car salesman Businessman
- Family: Beale
- Father: Pete Beale
- Mother: Pat Butcher
- Adoptive father: Brian Wicks
- Stepfather: Frank Butcher; Roy Evans
- Stepmother: Kathy Beale
- Half-brothers: Simon Wicks; Ian Beale
- Wife: Lorraine Foster (backstory)
- Sons: Joe Wicks
- Daughters: Bianca Jackson; Karen Wicks
- Grandsons: Liam Butcher; Morgan Butcher
- Granddaughters: Tiffany Butcher; Holly; Whitney Dean (adoptive)
- Grandfathers: Albert Beale
- Grandmothers: Lou Beale
- Aunts: Pauline Fowler
- Nephews: Steven Beale; Peter Beale; Bobby Beale
- Nieces: Lucy Beale
- First cousins: Mark Fowler; Michelle Fowler; Martin Fowler
- Other relatives: Bex Fowler

David Wicks is a fictional character from the BBC TV soap opera EastEnders, portrayed by Michael French. The character originally appeared from 23 December 1993 until 21 November 1996. French returned temporarily from 1 January to 13 January 2012 ahead of a permanent return the following year on 26 September 2013. On 17 May 2014, it was announced that French would depart for a third time, last appearing on 30 May 2014. In July 2024, it was announced that French would reprise the role, appearing from 3 to 10 October 2024.

David has been involved in various storylines, such as his troubled and dysfunctional reconciliation with his children Bianca Jackson (Patsy Palmer) and Joe Wicks (Paul Nicholls), his volatile and equally dysfunctional relationship with his mother Pat Butcher (Pam St Clement), an affair with his sister-in-law Cindy Beale (Michelle Collins), reuniting with Carol Jackson (Lindsey Coulson) and struggling to cope with her diagnosis of breast cancer.

== Development ==
=== Departure ===
It was announced in February 1996 that French and Michelle Collins had decided to quit their roles of David and Cindy in order to pursue other roles. An EastEnders insider said that Cindy is desperate for David to leave the Square with her and the children and is said to "rock the square". Producers were reportedly trying to keep French with the show but only managed to persuade him to stay for another few months. French was rumoured to have "cracked up" when filming his final scenes as David. He broke down during filming and said to the cast: "I can't go on". An insider said that French repeatedly kept getting one line wrong and later stormed off set and refused to continue until crew members were able to calm him down.

=== Reintroduction (2012–2013) ===
On 7 July 2011, it was announced that St. Clement had quit EastEnders. In October 2011, it was rumoured that David and Simon were to return to EastEnders for Pat's departure storyline. The Sun reported producers were working to get French and Berry on board. A BBC spokesperson declined to comment on the report, saying "There has been a lot of speculation surrounding Pat's departure, however we are not going to comment on rumours at this stage as we don't want to spoil the storyline for viewers." On 13 November 2011, it was confirmed French would be reprising his role as David after an absence of 15 years. French returned to EastEnders as David Wicks in 2012 after more than 15 years away for the departure of Pam St Clement, who played his on-screen mother, Pat Butcher. His return was aired on New Year's Day 2012 and he again departed the soap on 13 January 2012. In All About Soap Awards 2012, Michael French won the Best Comeback award for his brief return as David Wicks. David and Carol reconcile. Coulson explained "Carol thinks, 'Why not?' David makes her feel good and she's not thinking very far ahead. She's in the moment. It's not just a sex thing, it's about having somebody love her again." She continued: "Carol will be very brittle if she loses David after this. She'll put up all her defences and think, 'That's it – nobody is going to destroy me again'." However, David tries to make peace with Derek but it fails and the plan backfires.

Eighteen months later, shortly after leaving the BBC drama Casualty, French reprised the role full-time in September 2013.

=== Second departure ===
In May 2014, it was announced that French was leaving the soap for a third time. His last episode was broadcast on 30 May 2014, which involved David leaving Walford following the breakdown of his relationship to Carol.

=== Return (2024) ===
On 16 July 2024, the show announced that French would return to the role of David for a short stint later in the year. French expressed excitement, commenting he was "honoured" to be asked to reprise the role, reminding viewers that "it may only be a brief visit, but we know from his past that David never fails to create a lot of drama in a very short time". Executive producer Chris Clenshaw was "thrilled" to hear French would return to the soap, teasing: "David's character was never shy of drama during his previous stints, and I can assure you this return will be no different". David returned to screens in episode 6990, broadcast on 3 October 2024 and departing a week later on 10 October 2024.

== Storylines ==
=== Backstory ===
David Wicks was born on 21 April 1962, conceived by his mother Pat Harris (Pam St Clement) and her first husband Pete Beale (Peter Dean). A few years later when David was growing up in 1966, his parents divorced and they subsequently went on to embark on a second marriage to their respective partners; Pat got remarried to her second husband Brian Wicks (Leslie Schofield), which led to the birth of their son Simon (Nick Berry); and meanwhile Pete got remarried to Pat's future best-friend Kathy Hills (Gillian Taylforth), who in turn gave birth to Pete's other son named Ian (Adam Woodyatt). From then onwards David was living with Pat and Simon before the family moved away from Walford in 1976, with Pete having no further contact with David in the process.

In his teenage years, David had a relationship with Carol Branning (Lindsey Coulson) and ended up getting her pregnant at the age of 14. It was then David and the rest of the Branning family tried to persuade Carol to have an abortion, before her eldest brother Derek (Terence Beesley, later Jamie Foreman) retaliated by severely beating David up. The Wicks family left Walford, due to Derek's aggression so David never knew if Carol had the abortion or not. For the next few years, David - along with his brother and their mother - suffered abuse at the hands of Brian during Pat's turbulent marriage with him. Pat also proved to be a negligent mother due to her alcoholism and constant promiscuity. In 1979, the 17-year-old David moved to live with his girlfriend, Lorraine Foster (Jacqueline Leonard) and she ends up getting pregnant at an early stage. They married in a quick wedding ceremony before 1980 came when their son, Joe (Paul Nicholls), was born by the time David was 18-years-old. This was followed by a daughter named Karen in 1982. However, David was a restless man as the years went on. He often felt tied down and ended up cheating on Lorraine multiple times with several romantic dalliances. In 1988, he eventually left his wife and their children.

=== 1993–1996 ===
David Wicks as he appeared in 1995.

David arrives for the funeral of his biological father Pete after the latter died in a car crash two weeks earlier; David initially does not interact with anyone. A few weeks later he moves in with Pat and soon goes into business with her stepson Ricky Butcher (Sid Owen) with a car lot that they name "Deals on Wheels". David receives a stark reminder of his past in the form of Carol and her large brood of children, who have just moved into Albert Square. She is very hostile towards him and is horrified when David begins to fall in love with her oldest daughter Bianca (Patsy Palmer). As such, his growing flirtatious affections towards Bianca often leaves Carol deeply concerned about their closeness. This results in Carol telling David that Bianca is his daughter in March 1994. David is horrified and agrees to keep his distance from Bianca, much to her chagrin.

The truth is revealed to an embarrassed Bianca in March 1995 when, after drunkenly trying to kiss David after he rescues her from being mugged, David is forced to confess that she is his daughter. Despite being initially hostile towards David over his absence during the majority of her life, Bianca has a change of heart and is keen to bond with her father. But the relationship is further complicated, when during July 1995, David confides in the Samaritans charity (unbeknownst to any of his family) that he still feels sexually attracted to Bianca despite the knowledge that he is her biological father. A case of GSA, this was one of EastEnders' most controversial and daring storylines at this point in the show's history. There is further tension when Bianca makes David uncomfortable by dating his stepbrother Ricky. Though David's unexplained strange behaviour towards Bianca is never fully explained to an unaware and confused Bianca, they eventually form a close bond naturally as a father and daughter. David's estranged son Joe arrives in Walford in April 1996. With him comes the news that his daughter Karen died in a car accident nine months previously. Joe's return causes many problems for David, and at first David rejects the idea of having his son back in his life. However, after Joe runs away and arrives back at David's again, he becomes more receptive to Joe and the idea of having him in his life again. Eventually Joe and Lorraine move down to London from Bolton and Joe moves in with David. However, Joe seriously blames himself for Karen's death, and this leads to Joe developing schizophrenia. Joe exhibits increasingly strange behaviour that gets progressively worse. This is one of the main reasons that David eventually leaves Walford.

By then, David has proven to be a notorious womaniser. He first dated Ricky's ex-wife Sam Mitchell (Danniella Westbrook) in an initial attempt to make Ricky jealous. Thereupon he clashed with Sam's two overprotective brothers, Phil (Steve McFadden) and Grant (Ross Kemp), when they warned him to stay away from her. It was then Sam convinced her mother Peggy (Barbara Windsor) that she likes David, who appears to recuperate her feelings until they later break up. David continues to feud with the Mitchell Brothers when they accuse him of taking advantage of their best friend, Nigel Bates (Paul Bradley), at one point. In an earlier incident, Grant punches David for flirting with Grant's wife Sharon (Letitia Dean) in the pub. When Grant and Lorraine later begin to grow romantically close, David attempts to warn her off and Grant later trashes his flat in retaliation.

By 1996, David has started to bond with Ian following their father's death. However, it was at that point he got acquainted with Ian's wife Cindy (Michelle Collins) as well. Soon enough David and Cindy embarked on a passionate affair behind Ian's back for over a year. In September 1996, Ian eventually finds out the truth about Cindy's affair and David and confronts them about it; Cindy becomes obsessed with the idea of running off with David, and hires a hit man to kill Ian when he threatens to take custody of their children. Ian is shot but survives, and when David finds out he ends the relationship, but not before helping Cindy escape with her two sons. Shortly after, David has a fling with ex-partner, Carol. Eventually, the truth is revealed about David's affair with Cindy and his fore-knowledge of the attempted murder of Ian. The loss of friends and alienation of his family, together with Joe's worsening mental condition with schizophrenia, leads David to decide in leaving Albert Square for Milan. David leaves in a torrent of tears after telling Joe that he is going.

=== 2012–2014 ===
In 2010, Bianca receives £10,000 for her wedding from David, as he is unable to attend. In December 2011, Pat phones David after she learns that he has had an affair with his brother Simon's partner, Miriam. Pat argues with David on the phone about his infidelity, and ends the call on bad terms.

David returns the following month after hearing that Pat is ill. He is later stunned to discover that Pat is in fact dying of pancreatic cancer. They argue and David resolves to leave, but Carol persuades him to stay. Derek arrives and provokes David, and a fight breaks out. David tells Derek he is staying and returns to Pat, where he forgives her for her past mistakes and she dies in his arms. David decides to stay in Walford to plan Pat's funeral. He flirts with Sam's cousin Roxy (Rita Simons) and goes to have sex with her, but has second thoughts and nothing happens. David then declares his love for Carol. She reciprocates, and the pair reunite. David tries to settle his differences with Derek, but Derek threatens him. Michael Moon (Steve John Shepherd) suggests to David that they should team up to bring Derek down and get him arrested. David agrees after Derek upsets Carol. They attempt to set Derek up by having Michael plant stolen goods in Derek's home. However, Derek catches Michael in the act, and Michael blames the entire scheme on David. When David learns of this he begs Carol to leave with him. Carol agrees, but following Pat's funeral, David is confronted by Derek, who is aided by his brothers Jack (Scott Maslen) and Max (Jake Wood). Tensions rise when Derek threatens to kill David, but Jack and Max restrain Derek as they let David go. As he returns to his car to meet Carol, he sees her saying an emotional goodbye to Bianca and her family, so realises her family needs her and leaves without her. David sends a letter to Carol but it is intercepted and locked away by Derek. After Derek dies, the letter is found and Carol tries to contact David but discovers his phone number has been disconnected.

Several months later in 2013, David unexpectedly arrives at Carol's house - thus interrupting her date with fellow neighbour Masood Ahmed (Nitin Ganatra) by saying he has a present for Bianca. It is then David's girlfriend, Naomi (Lisa Maxwell), arrives with a suitcase of cash that they stole from her husband Don (Simon Thorp). Naomi realises that David wants to give some of the cash to Bianca, and when he says they are just using each other, she calls Don, who arrives and beats David up. Carol takes him in, which bothers Masood. When he recovers, he agrees to leave but manipulates Carol into letting him stay until Bianca returns. He attempts to meddle in Masood and Carol's relationship because he wants Carol back. When Bianca returns, she is overjoyed to see David, but asks him to leave for Carol's sake. However, she changes her mind when she decides she wants her father around. David realises that Max is in prison because he was set up by Carl White (Daniel Coonan) and that Ian is probably lying about being a witness. When David cannot convince Ian to retract his statement, he tells Phil about it; Phil later kidnaps Ian so that Max is set free and Carol has her brother back. In gratitude, Max offers David a job at the car lot. David and Carol drift apart and she asks him to leave the family home. After Alice's brother Joey Branning (David Witts) tips him off, David becomes suspicious that his former stepsister Janine Butcher (Charlie Brooks) killed Michael and has framed Alice Branning (Jasmyn Banks). He manipulates Janine into letting him move in and then into confessing the murder. He records the confession on his phone and blackmails Janine into giving him £250,000 or he will reveal the truth.

When Carol starts to act erratically, David asks her what the matter is. She brings him along to a doctor's appointment where he discovered she has breast cancer. Carol later invites David to move back in with her. Janine panics that she may go to prison and decides to kill David by running him over with a car, but he suffers only minor injuries. He takes Janine to her house and takes the £250,000, but agrees to wait a day before calling the police, so that Janine can have a chance to be a mother to her daughter Scarlett, while still ensuring Alice's release from prison. He also blurts out about Carol's cancer to Janine, saying that he wants the money to pay for her care. David returns to Carol's house, where she reveals she found his phone and has heard Janine's confession. He asks for his phone back, but she tells him that she's handed it to Joey. When he goes to stop Joey, he sees Janine being arrested. David asks Max, who rents the car lot building, if he can have a 50% control of the business, and offers him £50,000 to do it up. When Max refuses, David tells him about Carol's illness and he decides to accept the offer. However, Max is furious when he finds the Portakabin he uses being taken away. About an hour later, a bigger Portakabin arrives with a new name, titled Deals On Wheels. David later buys the building from Roxy, for £100,000, leaving him in full control of the business. However, he promises Carol that he will continue to treat Max properly. In February 2014, Carol dumps Masood, after realising that she still loves David, and the couple get engaged the following month. In the build-up to the wedding, David is tempted by Nikki Spraggan (Rachel Wilde), and kisses her on one occasion, though he regrets this and rejects her on several other occasions, even after she allows him to see her naked. When Bianca discovers this, David reaffirms his love for Carol. On the day of the wedding, David suffers a heart attack and collapses in the middle of the Square, leading Carol to believe that he has jilted her again. He is taken into hospital, where Carol eventually realises he is, and visits him. However, they argue, as Carol believes that he isn't as ill as he is making out. Carol leaves the hospital. David discharges himself the next day, and visits Carol at home. Despite their attempts to save their relationship, both concede that they cannot work. After sharing one last dance together, David agrees to move out and also to return to hospital. However, he changes his mind at the last minute and asks his driver to take him to Heathrow Airport alone. It is later revealed that David is living in the United States.

=== 2024 ===
Following Bianca's return to Walford in September 2024 to prove her half-sister Sonia Fowler's (Natalie Cassidy) innocence for the murder of Debbie Colwell (Jenny Meier), her best friend Kat Mitchell (Jessie Wallace) becomes concerned about her mental health and contacts Ricky. Ricky in turn contacts David, who arrives in Walford in October 2024 to support Bianca. They have a heart-to-heart and David apologises for abandoning her, but becomes concerned with her obsessive and erratic behaviour towards Sonia's partner Reiss Colwell (Jonny Freeman). He encourages Reiss to take a break from Walford in order to put some distance between him and Bianca, to her fury. David then receives a shock when he finds out his former lover Cindy, who he has not seen for 28 years, is not dead as originally thought but alive and reconciled with Ian. After finding out about Cindy's ex-husband George Knight (Colin Salmon) and daughters Gina (Francesca Henry) and Anna (Molly Rainford), David tells Cindy he knows she will never truly be happy with Ian. David convinces Bianca to see her GP, however he has to leave for a business trip, leaving her devastated. David has one final drink at The Queen Vic where he speaks with Cindy at her engagement party to Ian, telling he hopes it works out, before confronting Junior Knight (Micah Balfour) for taking advantage of Bianca a few months prior. After Junior storms off Cindy follows him, and David catches them kissing. David confronts Cindy and she confesses that she doesn't love Ian or Junior but is in fact still in love with George. After initially hesitating, David decides to keep Cindy's secret. He later asks Bianca's to come with him, but she declines, opting to stay to support Sonia, but they part on good terms. As David walks through Albert Square one last time he takes a video call from Joe and his daughter Holly (Chloe Marshall), confirming that he is heading on the train to go and see them and watch his granddaughter graduate. David and Cindy are unaware that their conversation was accidentally recorded by Kat's nephew Freddie Slater (Bobby Brazier) and Cindy's daughter Anna, during their birdsong recording. This later leads to Cindy and Junior's affair being exposed on Christmas Day 2024.

== Reception ==
In 1998, writers from Inside Soap published an article about the top ten characters they wanted to return to soap. David was featured and they described him as "a used-car salesman and Walford's very own Juan Don." They added that his 1996 departure remained authentic to his "true lothario style". In 2020, Sara Wallis and Ian Hyland from The Daily Mirror placed David 12th on their ranked list of the best EastEnders characters of all time, calling him "womanising" and a "Smoother talker", as well as calling his relationships with Carol, Bianca and Joe "explosive". Upon the announcement of the character's return, Justin Harp of Digital Spy called David "legendary" and billed him as "Cindy Beale's notorious ex-boyfriend". Clenshaw described the character as "one of EastEnders' most beloved rogues". Michele Theil of PinkNews deemed David an "iconic" character. Laura-Jayne Tyler from Inside Soap named David's 2024 return as the highlight of British soap operas in that week, writing, "Has anyone in soapland ever slotted back into a show more seamlessly than returning star Michael French did with EastEnders? It's not just the old David Wicks charm that had us swooning through our rose-tinted glasses, it was all the little things, the mannerisms – right down to a quick swig of a brew or a mouthful of buttered toast. Don't be a stranger, Michael!"
