= Wick House =

Wick House may refer to:

in England

- Wick House, Richmond Hill, designed by Sir William Chambers for Sir Joshua Reynolds
- The Wick, Richmond, Surrey, currently owned by Pete Townshend

in the United States

- Jockey Hollow, also known as Wick House

== See also ==
- Wick (disambiguation)
