= WIC =

WIC may stand for:

== Businesses and organizations ==
- WIC program, the U.S. Special Supplemental Nutrition Program for Women, Infants and Children
- Dutch West India Company, in the 17th and 18th centuries
- West Island College, a system of three private schools in Canada
- Western International Communications, a former Canadian media company
- Women's Industrial Council a 1894 - c.1917) British feminist organisation
- World In Common, a libertarian-left political project
- World Internet Conference, an annual event organized by the Chinese government

== Science and technology ==
- WAN Interface Card, a specialized network interface controller card
- Windows Imaging Component, an imaging codec framework

== Transportation ==
- Wickford railway station, Basildon, England, station code WIC
- Wick Airport, Scotland, IATA airport code WIC

== Other uses ==
- -wīc, an Anglo-Saxon suffix used for -wich towns
- Washington International Competition, a competition held by the Friday Morning Music Club
- Wic Kjellin (1914–1987), Swedish film editor
- Wichita language, ISO 639 language code wic
- World in Conflict, a 2007 video game

== See also ==
- Wick (disambiguation)
- County Wicklow, Ireland
