= This Week =

This Week may refer to:

- This Week (1956 TV programme), a 1956–1992 British current affairs television programme broadcast on ITV
- This Week (2003 TV programme), a weekly British political discussion television programme that aired on BBC One between 2003 and 2019
- This Week (American TV program), an American Sunday morning political interview and talk show program broadcast on ABC since 1981
- This Week (radio series), a Sunday radio show broadcast on RTÉ Radio 1 in Ireland
- This Week (album), a 2004 music album by rapper Jean Grae
- This Week (magazine), a defunct American magazine
- This Week (newspaper), a defunct national tourism newspaper for Wales

== See also ==
- The Week (disambiguation)
