= Wix =

Wix may refer to:

== Computing ==
- WiX (Windows Installer XML Toolset), a software toolset
- Wix.com, an Israeli software company offering cloud-based web development tools and services

== Places ==
- Wix, Essex, United Kingdom
- Vicques, Switzerland, formerly Wix

== Other uses ==
- Wix (name), a given name and surname
- Wix Wickens or Wix (Paul Wickens, born 1956), keyboardist
- An oil filter brand name owned by Mann+Hummel

== See also ==
- Wicks (disambiguation)
- Wickes (disambiguation)
- Wicks (surname)
