= Wick (surname) =

An English topographic name for someone who lived on an outlying farm; it is a modern variation of the Anglo-Saxon wic. The surname is also of German origin.

== People ==
- Cole Wick (born 1993), American athlete and NFL player
- Denis Wick (1931–2025), British orchestral trombonist
- Douglas Wick (born 1954), American movie producer
- Emily Wick, American academic and MIT professor
- Evan Wick (born 1997), American wrestler
- Frances Wick (1875–1941), American physicist
- Gian Carlo Wick (1909–1992), Italian theoretical physicist
- Hal Wick (1944–2018), American politician
- Helmut Wick (1915–1940), German Luftwaffe fighter pilot
- Hilton Wick (1920–2006), American politician and Vermont Senator
- Holger Wick (born 1962), German biathlete
- Joe Wick (1916–1994), German orchestra conductor, singer and drummer
- Johann Jakob Wick (1522–1588), a Protestant clergyman from Zürich
- John Wick (game designer)
- John Wick, a whistleblower responsible for the disclosure of expenses of British Members of Parliament
- Milton I. Wick, American newspaper businessman who founded Wick Communications Company.
- Rowan Wick (born 1992), Canadian baseball player
- Stan Wick, (born 1984) Swiss-born Irish ice hockey centre, currently contracted to HC Ambrí-Piotta.
- Temperance Wick, American heroine
- Walter Wick (born 1953), American artist and photographer
- William W. Wick (1796–1868), American politician, United States Congressman, and Secretary of State of Indiana

== Fictional characters ==
- John Wick, titular character of the eponymous film series, and films John Wick: Chapter 1 (2014), John Wick: Chapter 2 (2017), John Wick: Chapter 3 – Parabellum (2019), and John Wick: Chapter 4 (2023)

== See also ==
- Wick (disambiguation)
- Wicks (surname)
