= Joe Wicks (EastEnders) =

Fictional character from the BBC soap opera EastEnders

- EastEnders character
- Portrayed by: Paul Nicholls
- Duration: 1996–1997, 2024
- First appearance: Episode 1267; 25 March 1996
- Last appearance: Episode 6994; 10 October 2024
- Created by: Ian Aldwinkle
- Introduced by: Corinne Hollingworth (1996); Chris Clenshaw (2024)
In-universe information
- Family: Beale
- Father: David Wicks
- Mother: Lorraine Wicks
- Sisters: Karen Wicks
- Half-sisters: Bianca Jackson
- Daughters: Holly
- Grandfathers: Pete Beale
- Grandmothers: Pat Butcher; Hazel Foster
- Uncles: Simon Wicks; Ian Beale
- Nephews: Liam Butcher; Morgan Butcher
- Nieces: Tiffany Butcher
- First cousins: Steven Beale; Peter Beale; Lucy Beale; Bobby Beale

Joe Wicks is a fictional character from the BBC soap opera EastEnders, played by Paul Nicholls. He initially appears on screen between 25 March 1996 and 14 November 1997 and returns for a cameo appearance via a video call to his father, David Wicks (Michael French), twenty-seven years later on 10 October 2024. EastEnders was praised for the character's portrayal of schizophrenia.

== Creation and development ==
EastEnders story editor, Ian Aldwinkle, decided to introduce a character with schizophrenia after working on the drama series Casualty, which featured violent and dramatic incidents involving people with the illness, but only focussed on the medical side. Aldwinkle researched the illness and says he was shocked to discover that it affects one in 100 people, but it was rarely spoken about. He said: "Because it has a continuing storyline, EastEnders was able to look at the effect that schizophrenia has on a family and on individual relationships. I wanted to humanise it and look at the emotional impact it has on people." He said he hoped that the storyline would be helpful, saying "It seems to me that mental illness is one of the last subjects that you can still make jokes about without being labelled politically incorrect, and that seems wrong. If I get just one letter from one person saying that the character of Joe Wicks has helped to change their life for the better, then I will be pleased."

EastEnders worked closely with experts from the National Schizophrenia Fellowship to make the plot as accurate as possible. Gary Hogman of the fellowship said "It was the largest ever schizophrenia awareness initiative, reaching an audience of 10 million people three times a week. People could watch Joe going through the motions. We showed things were not so bad and how you could get help. There is so much misinformation about schizophrenia with the media focusing on extreme cases. And Joe was a handsome young man, not a spotty loner. He showed that schizophrenia can happen to anyone and made it easier for people to talk about it."

The National Schizophrenia Fellowship contacted mental health organisations in other countries to brief them on how they could use the storyline to raise awareness.

In January 2012, Nicholls told the Press Association that he cannot remember his time on EastEnders as Joe. The actor said "I can't really remember it. It's really weird. I remember driving to work and being on set a few times, but if I ever look back now, it's just blank. I just can't really remember being in it. I do recall coming out of EastEnders and the attention dying down 50% in the first six months, and then a couple of years later it was 95%."

== Storylines ==
Joe arrives in Albert Square from Bolton in 1996, looking for his father, David Wicks (Michael French), following the death of his sister Karen in a car crash. At first, David rejects his son, and sends him home. However, after Joe runs away again and turns up at David's, he becomes more receptive. Eventually Joe and his mother Lorraine (Jacqueline Leonard) move to London and Joe moves in with David. Karen's death has seriously affected Joe and he blames himself because the day Karen died, they had had an argument over who would sit in the front seat of the car. Joe won and Karen was in the back when a lorry crashed into the car. Karen was badly injured and died whilst Joe escaped with minor injuries. This leads to Joe developing schizophrenia and exhibiting increasingly strange behaviour. Whilst suffering from schizophrenia, Joe attempts suicide, hides Nellie Ellis's (Elizabeth Kelly) deceased cat Mandoo in a box in his bedroom and shocks his father when he covers his room with old newspaper articles relating to aliens.

While in Walford, Joe gets engaged to Sarah Hills (Daniela Denby-Ashe) but has a one-night stand with his second cousin, Mary Flaherty (Melanie Clark Pullen). This makes him realise that he is too young to get married, so he calls off the engagement. He and his mother, Lorraine, leave in 1997, returning to Bolton although Joe reportedly reconciles with Sarah many years later. In 2012, when David visits his dying mother, Pat Butcher (Pam St Clement), he tells her that Joe has a girlfriend who has children, and that he stayed with them for a while but it did not work out. However, when David is arguing with Carol Jackson (Lindsey Coulson), it is revealed that Joe and David have lost contact and he has no address for his son. In October 2024, David video calls Joe, revealing they are on speaking terms again, and that Joe now has a teenage daughter named Holly (Chloe Marshall). David then decides to leave Walford to see them, especially to see Holly graduate.

== Reception ==
Andy Bell of the Sainsbury Centre for Mental Health criticised TV and films for portraying schizophrenia patients as a stereotype of a person who is in a hopeless situation, but said EastEnders "broke the mould", saying "It was an excellent storyline, and, importantly for us, was very well-handled." The storyline prompted thousands of calls from sufferers and their families to the National Schizophrenia Fellowship, who said that the story broke society's taboo on talking about the illness and praised the sensitive way in which the illness was portrayed. The fellowship said the story did more to break the stigma attached to schizophrenia than any number of worthy media appeals. The fellowship's chief executive Bharat Mehta, said that EastEnders helped to destroy the myths that schizophrenia meant that a person had a split personality and that the illness was likely to make them violent. Matthew Bayliss of The Guardian said that Joe's schizophrenia earned EastEnders much acclaim because he was David's son and Pat's grandson: "His illness affected people we knew and cared about, so its key scenes were charged with emotion." Nicholls' role as Joe saw him nominated 'Most Popular Newcomer' in the 1996 National Television Awards, and 'Most Popular Actor' the following year.

The character's exit from the soap was viewed by 22 million people. Laura-Jayne Tyler from Inside Soap praised Joe's 2024 return, writing, "The name Joe Wicks will mean something else entirely to today's audience. But for those of us who grew up watching 90s EastEnders, our cup runneth over!"
