= Wickes (disambiguation) =

Wickes is a publicly listed home improvement retailer based in the UK.

Wickes may also refer to:

== Companies ==
- Wickes Furniture, a former US-based furniture store chain
- Wickes Companies, a defunct company, later called Collins & Aikman

== Places ==
- Wix, Essex (archaic spelling), England

=== United States ===
- Wickes, Arkansas, a city
- Wickes, Missouri
- Wickes, Montana, a ghost town

== Ships ==
- Wickes-class destroyer
- USS Wickes (DD-75)
- USS Wickes (DD-578)

== Other uses ==
- Wickes (surname)
- Wickes Stadium, a football stadium in Michigan, United States
- Wickes High School, Wickes, Arkansas

== See also ==
- Wicks (disambiguation)
- Wix (disambiguation)
