= Auburn (Natchez, Mississippi) =

- U.S. National Register of Historic Places
- U.S. National Historic Landmark
- Mississippi Landmark
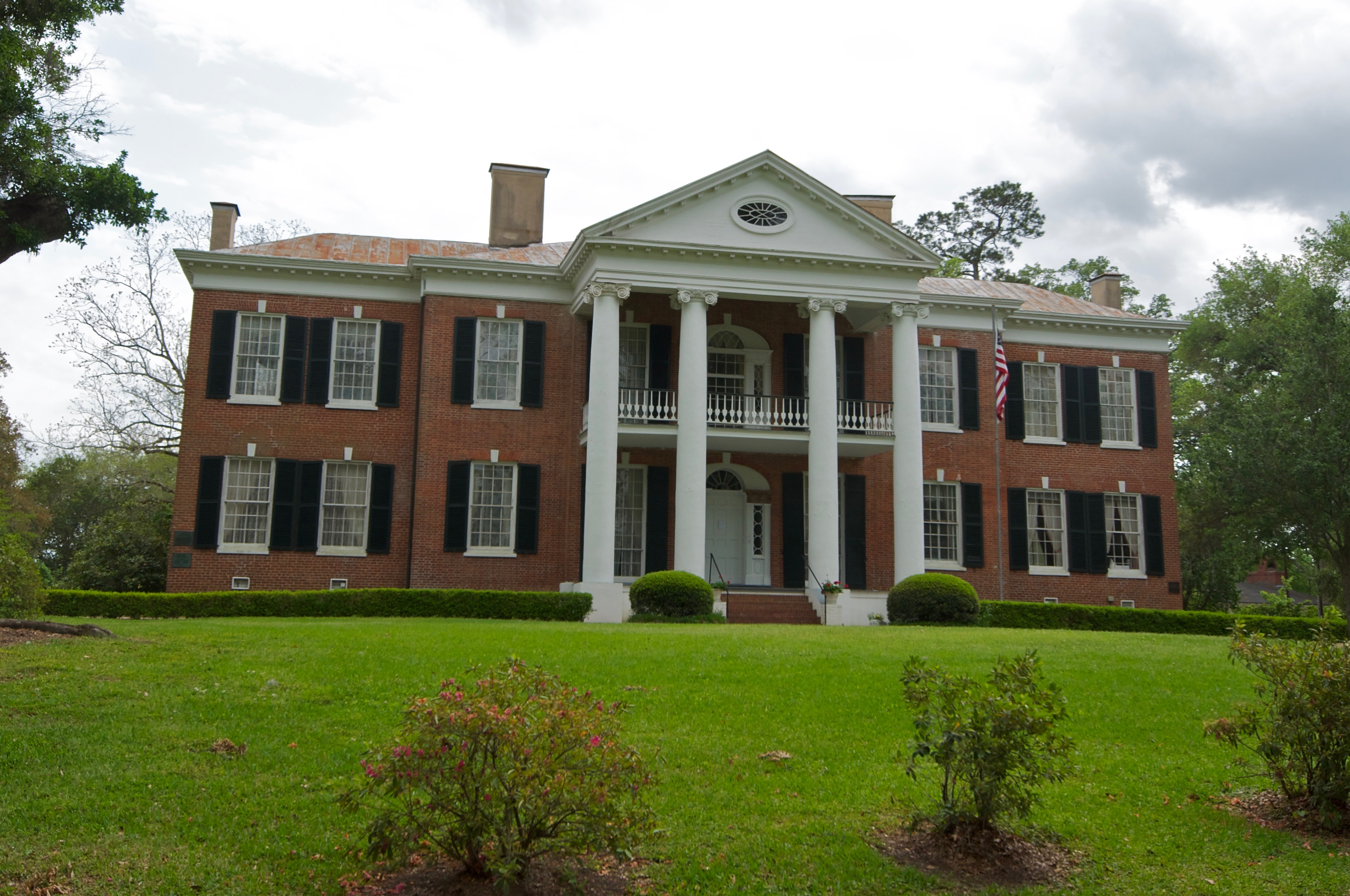
- Auburn mansion in April 2011

- Location within Mississippi Location within the United States
- Location: Duncan Park, Natchez, Mississippi
- Coordinates: 31.54565°N 91.390733°W
- Area: 4.2 acres (1.7 ha)
- Built: 1812
- Architect: Levi Weeks
- Architectural style: Federal style
- NRHP reference No.: 74001047
- USMS No.: 001-NAT-4002-NHL-ML

Significant dates
- Added to NRHP: May 30, 1974
- Designated NHL: May 30, 1974
- Designated USMS: January 5, 1984

Auburn is a Federal mansion in Duncan Park in Natchez, Mississippi. It was designed and constructed by Levi Weeks in 1812, and introduced academic Classical order architecture in the Mississippi territory. Its prominent two-story portico served as a model for the subsequent architectural development of local and nationally important mansions. It was declared a National Historic Landmark in 1974 and a Mississippi Landmark in 1984.

== Description ==
Auburn is a two-story brick building, with a Palladio exterior and Regencia interior, constructed of a central core and flanking symmetrical wings. A four-column temple front adorns the center of the block, with modified Ionic columns supporting an entablature and fully pedimented gable. The gable has modillioned cornices and an oval window at its center. The main entrance is set in a segmented-arch opening along with flanking sidelight windows and a transom window above. Sheltered by the temple portico is a second floor balcony, which is accessed via a three sash window, the earliest of the type in the city.

== History ==
In 1811, Lyman Harding, the first Attorney General of Mississippi, hired Levi Weeks, a young architect, to design and build the mansion. The original building was 60 feet (18 m) by 45 feet (14 m) with a two-story portico supported by four columns and includes an unusual floating spiral staircase between the first and second floors. Levi Weeks designed the house to be, in his words, the "most magnificent building in the state."

After Harding died in 1820, the building was bought by Dr. Stephen Duncan, who expanded the house to include two symmetrical wings, greatly expanding interior space. Duncan later abandoned the building amidst growing secession tensions just before the American Civil War, and the house was placed in the care of his descendants.

The building and 203 acres (82 ha) was donated by the family to the city of Natchez in 1911 and is now a historic house museum in a public park. The donation also included the Duncan family furnishings, which the city quickly and unfortunately sold. The grounds were converted by the City of Natchez into Duncan Park.

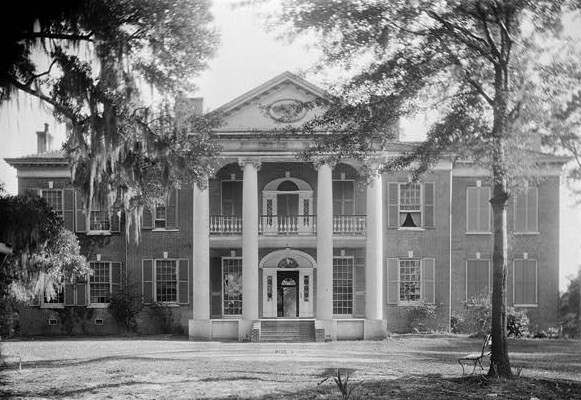
Auburn mansion in 1936

== See also ==
- List of National Historic Landmarks in Mississippi
- National Register of Historic Places listings in Adams County, Mississippi
