= John Wick (disambiguation) =

John Wick is an American media franchise.

John Wick may also refer to:

== John Wick action franchise ==
- John Wick (character), the main protagonist of the John Wick film series portrayed by Keanu Reeves
- John Wick (film), 2014 action film and the first film in the franchise
  - John Wick (soundtrack), the film's soundtrack
- John Wick (comics), also known as John Wick: The Book of Rules, a comic book based on the character set in the franchise

== Other uses ==
- John Wick (game designer), American RPG designer
- John Wick, former Special Air Service major who was a source in the United Kingdom parliamentary expenses scandal
- John F. Wick, organist and founder of the Wicks Organ Company

== See also ==
- All pages with titles containing "John" and "Wick"
- Jan Wyck (1652–1702), artist
- John Wiik, politician
- John Wicks (disambiguation)
- Wick (disambiguation)
