= Joe Wick =

Josef "Joe" Wick (March 19, 1916, Siegburg – November 15, 1994, Hamburg) was a German jazz and dance bandleader.

Wick first played violin, then picked up drums, and was a drummer for the bands of Will Glahé, Peter Kreuder, Peter Igelhoff, Otto Dobrindt, Bernard Etté, and others. In 1942 he took leadership of the UFA GmbH dance band, and became a prisoner of war after Normandy was recaptured by Allied forces. He was then brought to London, where he performed on radio, including for the BBC. From 1946 to 1948 he led a new band which entertained troops in West Germany, and recorded copiously in 1948 for Brunswick and Deutsche Grammophon. He was active until 1964. Members of his orchestra went on to play with Kurt Edelhagen's ensemble.
