= Wicks (hairstyle) =

African-American hairstyle originating in South Florida

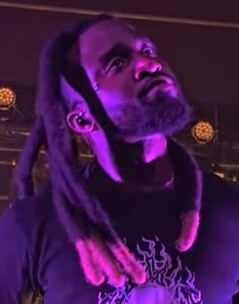
Singer Shaboozey sporting prominent wicks

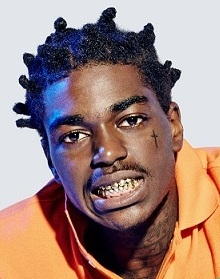
Rapper Kodak Black with short wicks

Wicks (also referred to as bonks or globs) are a hairstyle originating in South Florida by Haitians. This hairstyle is prevalent amongst African Americans. The hairstyle originated from Afro-Caribbean people involved in the Hip-Hop community as well as related subgenres in Florida.

== Methods ==
There are three main methods of creating Wicks:

- The "crochet needle method" which is the method of using a crochet needle, normally with two or more "fangs" to crochet existing locs together.
- The "combine method" which is the process of tying existing locs with rubber bands together allowing the locs to fuse together giving them the upright habit.
- The other method is the "freeform method" which is the process of allowing locs to naturally form via the rinse and go method and allowing the locs to naturally lock on to each other.

== Etymology ==
The term "Wicks" was given to this hairstyle due to the fact each one resembles the wick of a candle because of their upright positioning.

== See also ==
- Afro-textured hair
- Broward County
- Miami-Dade County
- African diaspora
- African American culture
- Demographics of Florida
- Sideshow Bob
- Roystonea regia
