= John H. Weeks =

John H. Weeks (March 15, 1845 – March 10, 1911) was an American soldier during the American Civil War who was awarded the Medal of Honor.

The medal was awarded on 1 December, 1864 for his actions as a private in the 152nd New York Infantry at the Battle of Spotsylvania Court House, Virginia on 12 May, 1864.

He was born in Hampton, Connecticut and is now interred in Hartwick Seminary Cemetery, New York.

== Medal of Honor Citation ==
Capture of flag and color bearer using an empty cocked rifle while outnumbered 5 or 6.
