= Weekes =

Weekes is a surname. Notable people with the surname include:

- Ambrose Weekes (1919–2012), British priest, bishop of Gibraltar
- Anthony Weekes, English Member of Parliament in 1563
- Cecil Weekes (1931–2012), Church of Ireland minister
- Clara Weekes (1852-1937), Australian educator, suffragist, labor leader and pacifist
- Claire Weekes (1903–1990), Australian general practitioner and health writer
- Dallon Weekes (born 1981), American musician, singer, and songwriter
- Donald Weekes (born 1930), former English cricketer
- Elias Weekes (1809–1881), Australian ironmonger and politician
- Sir Everton Weekes (1925–2020), leading former West Indian cricketer
- Hampton Weekes (1880–1948), English priest who was Archdeacon of the Isle of Wight
- Harold Weekes (1880–1950), American football player
- Henry Weekes (1807–1877), English sculptor of the mid-Victorian period
- Herbert William Weekes (1841–1914), English genre and animal painter of the Victorian Neoclassical period
- James Weekes (1911–1977), American sailor and Olympic champion
- Ken Weekes (1912–1998), West Indian cricketer
- Kevin Weekes (born 1975), retired Canadian ice hockey goaltender
- Lesroy Weekes (born 1971), West Indian cricketer who played for the Leeward Islands and English counties
- Liz Weekes (born 1971), Australian water polo player and Olympic champion
- Nick Weekes (born 1981), former English cricketer
- Paul Weekes (born 1969), former English cricketer
- Randy Weekes (born 1956), Canadian politician
- Trevor C. Weekes (1940–2014), Irish-born American astronomer
- William Weekes (died 1806), lawyer and political figure in Upper Canada

== See also ==
- Dan Weekes-Hannah (born 1987), New Zealand-born actor
- Roderick Kinkead-Weekes (born 1951), former South African-born English cricketer
- Weeks (disambiguation)
- Weelkes
- Wicks (disambiguation)
