= One Week =

One Week may refer to:

- One Week (1920 film), a short film starring and co-directed by Buster Keaton
- One Week (2008 film), a Canadian feature film directed by Michael McGowan
- "One Week" (song), a 1998 song by Barenaked Ladies
- One Week, a 2025 album by First of October

== See also ==
- Once a Week (disambiguation)
- Week (disambiguation)
