= Wick, Ohio =

Unincorporated community in Ohio, U.S.

Coordinates: 41°32′03″N 80°38′50″W

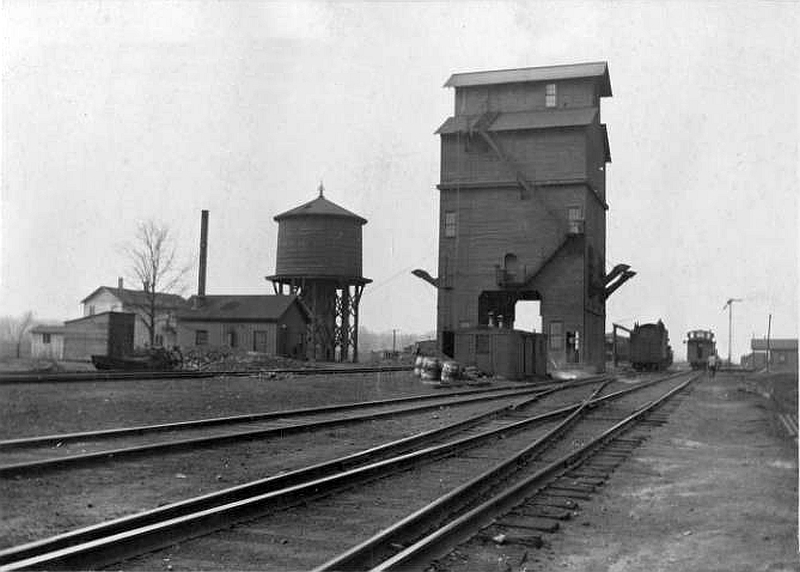
Railroad station in Wicks (circa 1900-1920)

Wick is an unincorporated community in Ashtabula County, in the U.S. state of Ohio.

== History ==
A post office called Wick was established in 1890, and remained in operation until 1904. The community has the name of William Wick, a local minister.
