= Levi Weeks =

American architect and alleged murderer (1776–1819)

- Born: 1776; Greenwich, Massachusetts
- Died: 1819 (aged 42–43)
- Known for: Accused of murder in 1799
- Family: Ezra Weeks (brother)

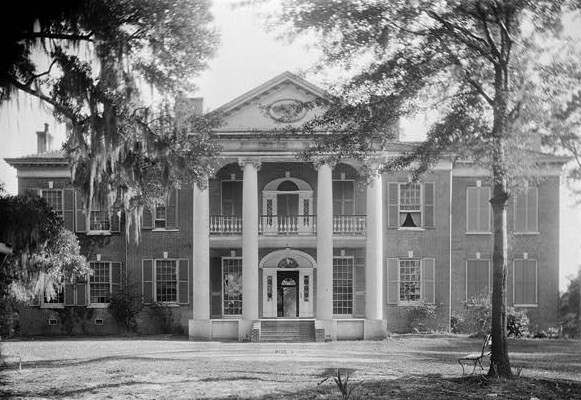
Auburn Mansion

Levi Weeks (1776 – 1819) was an American carpenter, known for being the accused in the infamous Manhattan Well Murder trial of 1800, the first murder trial in the United States for which there is a recorded transcript. He was the brother of Ezra Weeks, one of New York City's most successful builders of the time.

== Early life ==
Levi Weeks was born in 1776 in Greenwich, Massachusetts. He spent his childhood in the small town of Goshen in Hampshire County where he learned the trade of carpenter and builder from his father Thomas Weeks. He moved to New York City in 1798 to work for his older brother Ezra.

== Murder trial ==
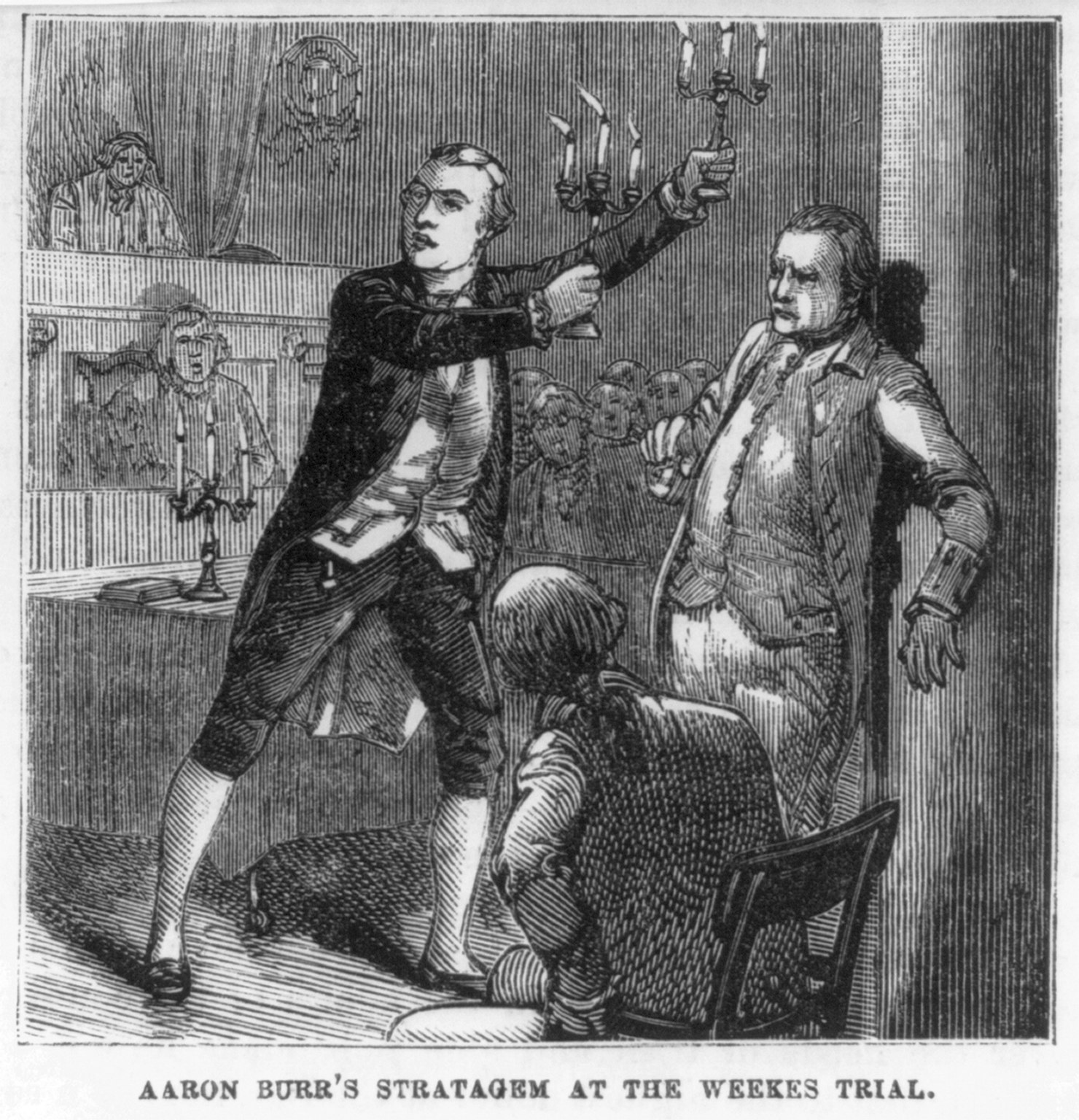
Aaron Burr's stratagem at the Weeks trial

Weeks was accused of murdering Gulielma "Elma" Sands, a young woman whom he had been courting. Elma disappeared on the evening of December 22, 1799. Some of her possessions were found two days later near the recently created Manhattan Well in Lispenard Meadows, located in today's SoHo near the intersection of Greene and Spring Streets. Her body was recovered from the well on January 2, 1800. Before leaving her boarding house on the 22nd, Elma told her cousins Catherine Ring and Hope Sands that she and Levi were to be secretly married that night.

The trial, which took place on March 31 and April 1, 1800, was sensational. Through his brother's connections and wealth, Weeks retained three of New York's most prominent attorneys, Henry Brockholst Livingston, Aaron Burr, and Alexander Hamilton. New York Supreme Court Chief Justice John Lansing Jr. presided on the bench, and future Mayor of New York Cadwallader David Colden was the prosecutor.

Although Elma was seen leaving with Weeks and a witness claimed to have seen Weeks making measurements at the well the Sunday before the murder, Weeks was acquitted after only five minutes of jury deliberation.

== Post-trial life ==
The public strongly disagreed with the verdict, and Weeks was ostracized by the citizens of the city, forcing him to leave New York. He eventually settled in Natchez, Mississippi, where he became a well-respected architect and builder. He married Ann Greenleaf in Natchez and they had four children. Weeks died in Natchez in 1819, at the age of 43. A house in Natchez designed by Weeks, Auburn Mansion, is a National Historic Landmark.

== In popular culture ==
- The trial is frequently referenced in the 1973 novel Burr, by Gore Vidal.
- The CBS Radio Mystery Theater episode of March 28, 1978, "The Ghost In The Well," is about the trial and acquittal of Levi Weeks, as told by the ghost of Elma Sands
- The 2015 novel “City of Liars and Thieves” by Eve Karlin describes the entire case from the perspective of Gulielma Sands’ cousin, Catherine Ring.
- In the 2015 musical Hamilton by Lin-Manuel Miranda, the song "Non-Stop" references the trial. However, Henry Brockholst is not mentioned in the song. Additionally, the trial's date is changed, taking place at some unspecified point before the Constitutional Convention of 1787 and after the Treaty of Paris (1783), during the government of the Articles of Confederation.
