= Weeks House (Greenland, New Hampshire) =

Historic house in New Hampshire, United States

- U.S. National Register of Historic Places
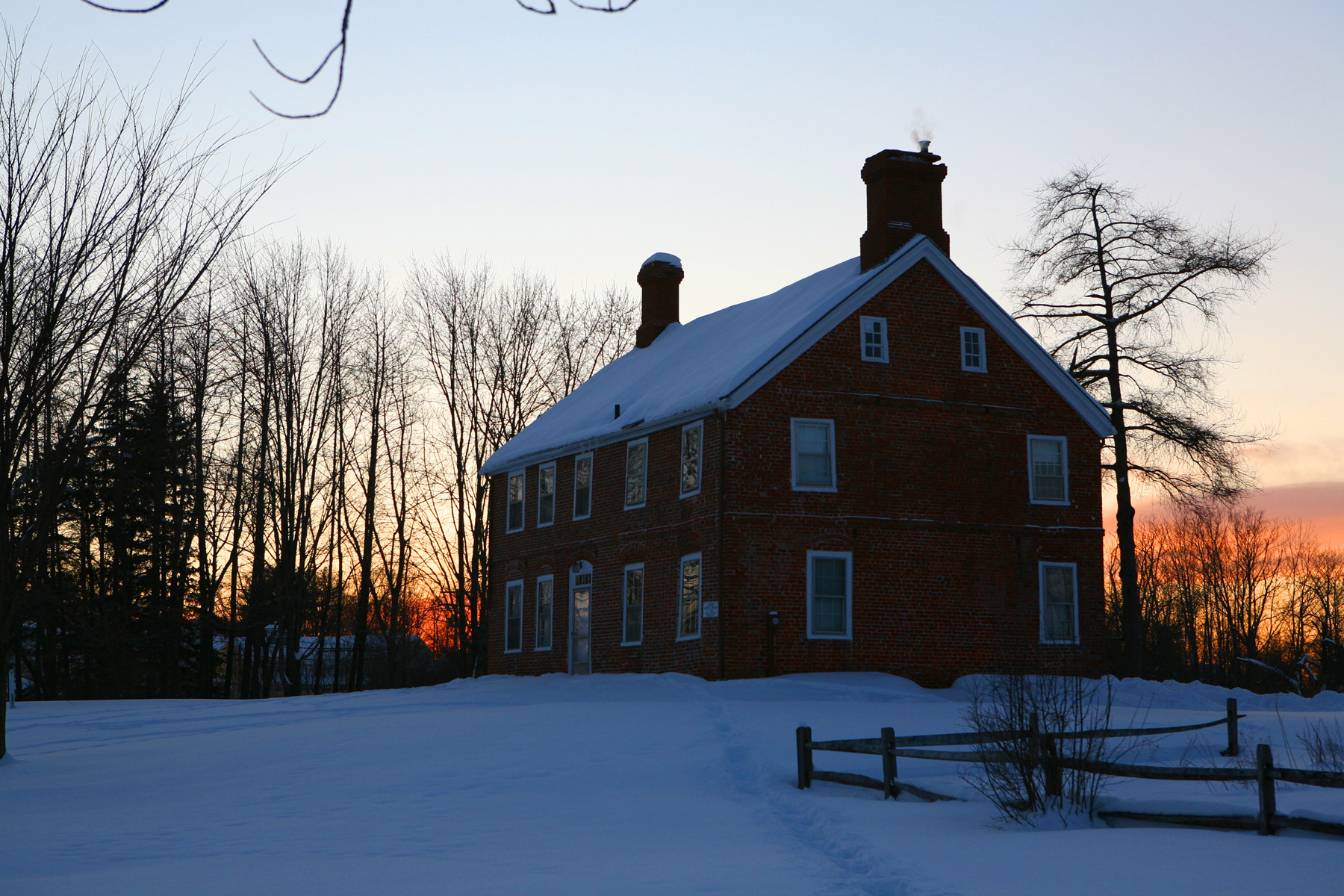

- Location within New Hampshire Location within the United States
- Location: Weeks Ave. off NH 33, Greenland, New Hampshire
- Coordinates: 43°2′16″N 70°50′26″W
- Area: 2 acres (0.81 ha)
- NRHP reference No.: 75000131
- Added to NRHP: June 20, 1975

The Weeks House, also known as the Old Brick House, is a historic house museum on Weeks Avenue in Greenland, New Hampshire. Built about 1710, it is one of the oldest brick buildings in New England. It was built by an early colonial member of New Hampshire's politically prominent Weeks family, and is now maintained by a family association. The house was listed on the National Register of Historic Places in 1975.

== Description and history ==
The Weeks House is located in the town center of Greenland, at the end of Weeks Avenue, a short spur off New Hampshire Route 33 near its junction with Tide Mill Road. The house is a two-story brick structure, with a gabled roof and end chimneys. It has a slightly asymmetrical five-bay facade, with the entrance in a slightly off-center central bay. The windows on either side are placed in even horizontal spacing, those on the right thus being a slightly greater distance apart from each other than those on the left. The entrance opening is topped by a segmented arch, allowing space for a multilight transom window.

The house was erroneously believed to be the oldest house in New Hampshire and dated to 1638, owing to a misreading of historic records. The land was granted to Samuel Haines early in New Hampshire's colonial history, and is where his son-in-law, Leonard Weeks, eventually built a house near his. The brick house now standing was probably built in the 1710s by Leonard's son Samuel, with Leonard's wood-frame house as an attached ell (destroyed by fire in 1938). The Weeks family has a long history of involvement in state and national politics, including John Wingate Weeks, John W. Weeks, and Sinclair Weeks. The house remained in the Weeks family until 1968, when it was sold out of the family. A family association repurchased the 33-acre (13 ha) property in 1975, and has adapted the property as conservation land, and a portion of the house as a museum.

The house's exact construction date is unknown; however, it appears to come after the construction of the MacPheadris–Warner House (built 1716–18) in nearby Portsmouth. That house was one of the first brick houses to be built anywhere in northern New England, and shares stylistic elements with the Weeks House. It is possible that the masons who built the MacPheadris–Warner House, who had been brought to Portsmouth from Boston, Massachusetts, left construction methods in the area that were applied in building this house.

== See also ==
- National Register of Historic Places listings in Rockingham County, New Hampshire
