= Charles H. Weeks =

American Union soldier during Civil War

- Civil War era Navy Medal of Honor
- Born: c. 1837; New Jersey
- Military career
- Allegiance: United States of America; Union
- Branch: United States Navy; Union Navy
- Rank: Captain of the Foretop
- Unit: USS Montauk
- Conflicts: American Civil War
- Awards: Medal of Honor

Charles H. Weeks (c. 1837 – ?) was an American sailor who fought in the Union Navy aboard the USS Montauk during the American Civil War. He was awarded the Medal of Honor which awarded to him for actions as a captain of the foretop off Port Royal, South Carolina on 21 September 1864.

== Medal of Honor citation ==
Served as captain of the foretop on board USS Montauk, 21 September 1864. During the night of 21 September, when fire was discovered in the magazine lightroom of that vessel, causing a panic and demoralizing the crew, Weeks, notwithstanding the cry of "fire in the magazine," displayed great presence of mind and rendered valuable service in extinguishing the flames which were imperiling the ship and the men on board.
