= John D. Weeks =

American chemist

John D. Weeks is an American chemist currently university distinguished professor at University of Maryland and an Elected Fellow of the American Association for the Advancement of Science and American Academy of Arts and Sciences. He has degrees from Harvard College and the University of Chicago.
