= Ezra Weeks =

American builder and court witness

Ezra Weeks, was a successful builder who served as a witness in a sensationalized murder trial.

Ezra Weeks was born in Greenwich, MA and lived most of his childhood in Goshen MA with his Father Thomas Weeks, mother Mercy Weeks and his six siblings. He learned the trade of carpenter and builder from his father and left for New York when he was a young man. He married Elizabeth Hitchcock on March 20, 1796 in New York City. They had six children, three died very young, George Washington Weeks, Eliza Ema Weeks, and Alexander Weeks. Three lived to adulthood and were married, Mary Ann Weeks, Caroline Louisa Weeks and Alfred Augustus Weeks.

Ezra Weeks had allied himself with the mercantile elite and had made powerful connections. His brother, Levi Weeks, was a carpenter by trade who worked closely with Ezra. The Weeks brothers’ main building project at the time was Hamilton Grange, a country house in Harlem Heights in Upper Manhattan. Alexander Hamilton was having a country seat built to rival Richmond Hill, the country home of his nemesis Aaron Burr. John McComb, the architect of Hamilton Grange, and Ezra Weeks would both be key defense witnesses for Ezra Weeks' brother, Levi in one of the most sensational murder trials of the turn of the 18th century.

Ezra Weeks was an object of curiosity within New York City society circles. Only a few years prior to being commissioned by Hamilton, he and his brother Levi were living at the corner of Greenwich and Harrison streets. On March 1, 1800, Levi was tried for the murder of Gulielma Sands. Ezra was the principal witness for Hamilton's defense.

Weeks was a member of St. John's Lodge in New York City, having affiliated in 1796.

Ezra Weeks worked with John McComb Jr. in the construction of Gracie Mansion (1799) and Hamilton Grange (1802).

== Sources ==
- Stern, Ellen Stock. 2005. Gracie Mansion: a celebration of New York City's mayoral residence. New York, NY: Rizzoli.
