= The Week (disambiguation) =

The Week is a weekly news magazine with editions in the United Kingdom and the United States.

The Week may also refer to:

- The Week (1933), newsletter published by Claud Cockburn, 1933–1941
- The Week (1964), socialist newsweekly edited by Pat Jordan, 1964–1968
- The Week (Brisbane), Australian newspaper 1876–1934
- The Week (Canadian magazine), literary and political magazine 1883–1896
- The Week (Indian magazine), news magazine founded in 1982

== See also ==
- Theweek, free weekly newspaper in Oman
- This Week (disambiguation)
- The Weeks, American band
