= James Weeks =

James Weeks may refer to:

- James Weeks (freedman), founder of the neighborhood of Weeksville, Brooklyn
- James Weeks (composer) (born 1978), British composer, conductor and teacher of composition
- James Weeks (artist) (1922–1998), American artist
