= Johnny Weeks =

Character from The Wire

- The Wire character
- Leo Fitzpatrick as Johnny Weeks
- First appearance: "The Target" (2002)
- Last appearance: "Mission Accomplished" (2004)
- Created by: David Simon
- Portrayed by: Leo Fitzpatrick

In-universe information
- Gender: Male
- Occupation: Drug addict, scrap stealer

Johnny Weeks is a fictional character on the HBO drama series The Wire, portrayed by Leo Fitzpatrick. A heroin addict, he commits a series of petty crimes to afford his habit, along with fellow addict Bubbles.

== Biography ==
=== Season 1 ===
In season 1, Johnny is Bubbles' best friend and a drug addict with notoriously bad luck. He is naive and enthusiastic for "the game", and allows Bubbles to play the role of teacher. In the pilot episode Johnny is badly beaten by Bodie Broadus, Poot Carr, and other dealers after trying to pass counterfeit money to D'Angelo Barksdale's operation. This spurs Bubbles to become a police informant.

While in the hospital for that beating, Johnny discovers he is HIV positive; he also undergoes a colostomy operation.

=== Season 2 ===
Johnny is first seen by Detective Jimmy McNulty, stealing from a shopping centre with Bubbles. McNulty catches Johnny and Bubbles, but instead of arresting them asks them to find stick up artist Omar Little. At the end of Season 2, Officer Santangelo arrests Bubbles and Johnny stealing morphine from an ambulance. They are released because Bubbles gives information about Proposition Joe's dealers at the projects, when Cheese is shot in the shoulder by Brother Mouzone.

=== Season 3 ===
Johnny and Bubbles continue to steal from scrapyards. For one of their short-cons in Episode 5, Bubbles suggests that he play the part of the threatening "bad guy" while Johnny plays the part of the helpful bystander, in order to conform to racial stereotypes and thus succeed in duping their targets.

Bubbles would rather make money by continuing to inform detectives McNulty and Greggs. Johnny finds out that Bubbles is a police informant and the two men quarrel over Bubbles's role. Realizing the futility in arguing with Johnny, Bubbles ditches him after a scam. Without Bubbles looking after him, Johnny overdoses and his body is discovered in a vacant house in Major Colvin's "Hamsterdam" free zone.
