= Charles M. Weeks House =

Historic house in New York, United States

- U.S. National Register of Historic Places
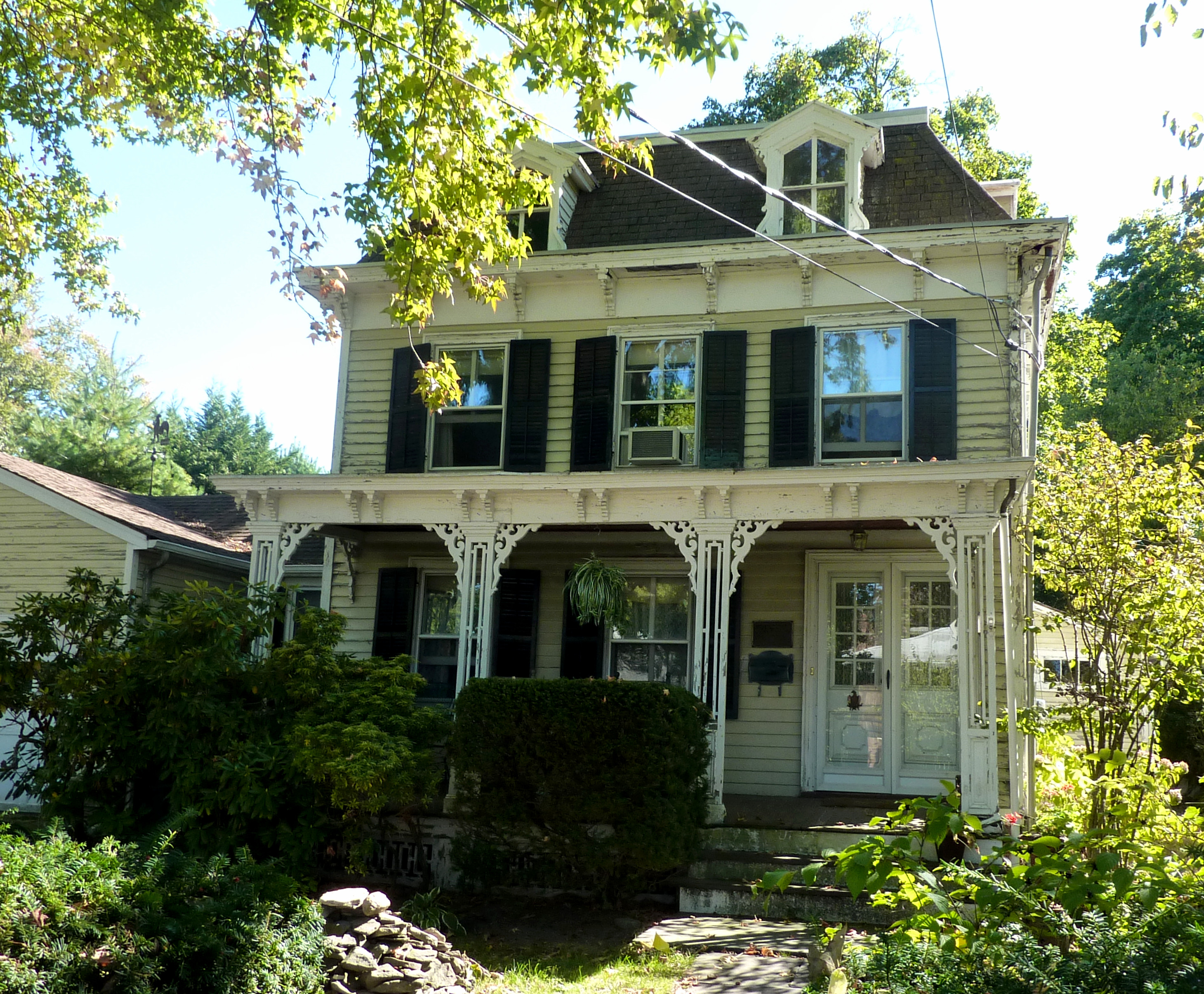

- Location within New York Location within the United States
- Location: 76 Mill Ln., Huntington, New York
- Coordinates: 40°52′45″N 73°25′10″W
- Area: 0.5 acres (0.20 ha)
- Built: 1860
- Architectural style: Second Empire
- MPS: Huntington Town MRA
- NRHP reference No.: 85002547
- Added to NRHP: September 26, 1985

Charles M. Weeks House is a historic home located at Huntington in Suffolk County, New York. It is a 2 1/2-story, clapboard residence with a mansard roof. It was built about 1860 and representative of the Second Empire style. It has a 2-story shed-roofed kitchen wing. Also on the property is a barn built about 1900.

It was added to the National Register of Historic Places in 1985.
