= Wicks =

Wicks may refer to:

- Wicks (hairstyle)
- Wicks (surname)
- Wicks (TV series), a Canadian television series (1979-81)

== See also ==
- Wick (disambiguation)
- Wickes (disambiguation)
- Wix (disambiguation)
