= Michael French =

English actor (born 1962)

- Born: Michael Clark; 17 September 1962 (age 64); Bow, London, England
- Occupation: Actor
- Years active: 1983–present

Michael French (born Michael Clark, 17 September 1962) is an English actor, known for his roles as David Wicks in EastEnders; Nick Jordan, a consultant and Clinical Lead, Senior Consultant in emergency medicine in Casualty and former cardiothoracic registrar in its spin-off series Holby City; and Jeff Slade in the BBC sci-fi crime series Crime Traveller.

== Biography ==
Michael French was born Michael Clark in Bow, London, on 17 September 1962. He appeared in school productions and shows put on by a local drama club. When he was 20, French worked as an entertainer at the Holiday Club International in Mallorca. When he returned to Britain, at the age of 22, French got his first acting break in the musical Godspell at the Kenneth More Theatre in Ilford, east London. He spent the next three years touring in small productions before becoming disillusioned with his lack of success and taking a job as an air steward for British Airways. Later, French quit his job with British Airways, began studying acting at the Mountview Academy of Theatre Arts and graduated in 1992.

In 1993, an EastEnders casting agent saw him performing in Les Misérables in London's West End and he was cast as David Wicks in the BBC soap opera EastEnders. He appeared in EastEnders between 1993 and 1996, and later reprised his role in 2012 for the departure of Pam St Clement who played his on-screen mother Pat Butcher, and again between 2013 and 2014. He also appeared as Nick Jordan in Casualty and its spin-off programme Holby City, between 1998 and 2000, returning to the role in Casualty between 2006 and 2013.

Other television work included Crime Traveller (1997), and Born and Bred (2002-2004). His other theatre work included Sacred Heart (1999), Art (2000), Chicago (2004), and The Sound of Music (2014). In July 2024, it was announced that French would be reprising his role of David Wicks in EastEnders for a short stint later in the year.

In 2000 he appeared in David Pugh and Sean Connery's production of the French play "Art" by Yasmina Reza at the Wyndham's Theatre in London. He played Marc alongside James Fleet as Serge and Stephen Tompkinson as Yvan.

== Filmography ==
Year	Show	Role	Notes
1993–1996, 2012–2014, 2024	EastEnders	David Wicks	Series regular (463 episodes)
1997	Crime Traveller	Detective Jeff Slade	8 part series
1998, 2008–2013	Casualty	Nick Jordan	Series regular
1999–2000, 2006, 2010	Holby City	Nick Jordan	Series regular
2001	The Fabulous Bagel Boys	DS Alexander Murchison	
2001	The Gentleman Thief	Ellis Bride	
2004	The Afternoon Play	Hardy Rose	1 episode: "Sons, Daughters and Lovers"
2001–2004	Born and Bred	Dr. Tom Gilder	Series regular
2005	Casualty@Holby City	Nick Jordan	2 episodes: "Deny Thy Father" (Parts 1&2)
2006	Dalziel and Pascoe	Gary Lescott	1 episode: "Wrong Time, Wrong Place"
2018	Bargain Hunt	Self	1 episode
