= Paul Nicholls (actor) =

English actor (born 1979)

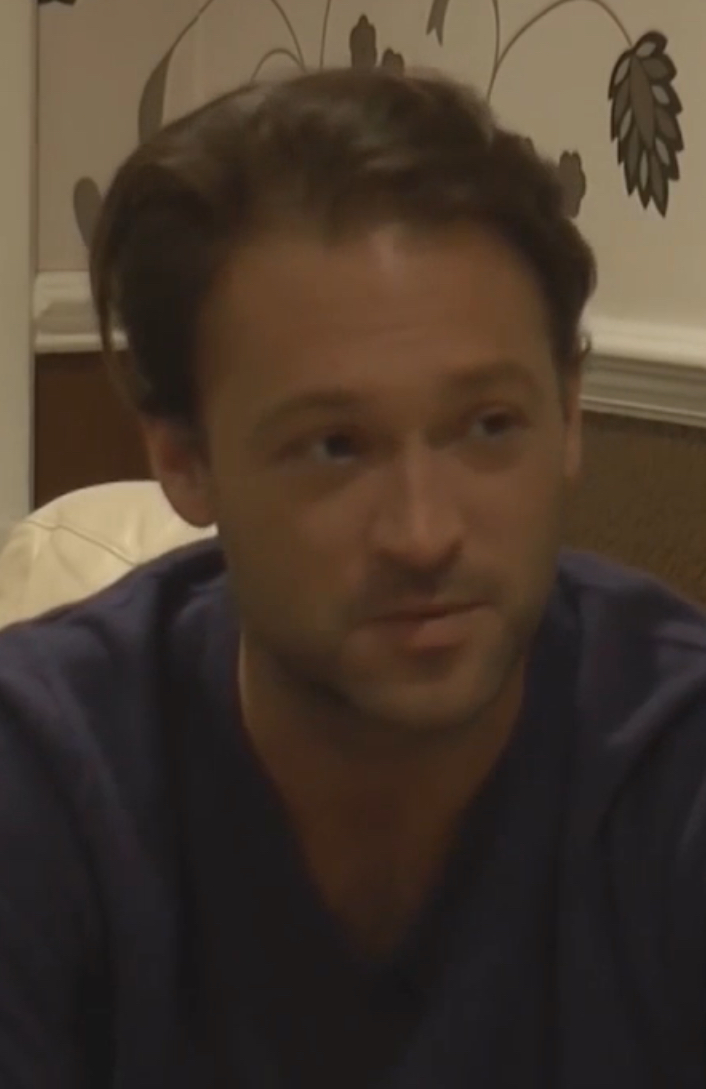
- Nicholls in 2016
- Born: Gerard Paul Greenhalgh; 12 April 1979 (age 47); Bolton, England
- Occupation: Actor
- Years active: 1990–present
- Spouse: Chantal Brown (m. 2008; div. 2015)

Gerard Paul Greenhalgh (born 12 April 1979), known professionally as Paul Nicholls, is an English actor. He is known for his roles as Joe Wicks in the BBC soap opera EastEnders, DS Sam Casey in the ITV drama Law & Order: UK, and Steve Bell in the Channel 4 drama Ackley Bridge.

== Career ==
Nicholls made his television debut in 1990 at the age of 10, in Children's Ward. In 1994, he appeared in the BBC children's drama Earthfasts and The Biz, a teenage performing arts drama filmed at Hampton Court. In 1996, he appeared in an episode of Out of the Blue. Later that year, Nicholls began portraying the role of Joe Wicks in the BBC soap opera EastEnders, a role which he played until 1997, and a cameo appearance in 2024.

Nicholls appeared in several teenage stage roles, notably as Aladdin in Aladdin - Genie of the Ring at the Central Theatre in Chatham (1996–1997), and he made his London stage debut as Billy Fisher in the 1998 production of Billy Liar, at the King's Head Theatre in Islington.

Nicholls' 2008 career began as the character Robert Fielding in Harley Street alongside Suranne Jones. He also played Harry Keegan in Secret Diary of a Call Girl, Judas in another BBC series entitled The Passion, and appeared in A Thing Called Love. He then appeared in the 2012 feature film Life Just Is.

Nicholls also appeared as Simon Marshall in the BBC hospital drama serial Holby City between May and July 2012, and played Cal Beckett in Channel 4's crime thriller, The Fear. He played the role of DS Sam Casey in ITV's Law & Order: UK until the end of series 7 in 2013.

From 2017 to 2018, Nicholls portrayed the role of Steve Bell in the Channel 4 drama Ackley Bridge. From September to October 2018, Nicholls starred alongside Iwan Rheon in Foxfinder at the Ambassadors Theatre. In January 2019, Nicholls took over the role of Raymond from Mathew Horne in the British touring production of Rain Man.

== Personal life ==
Nicholls lives in Hampstead, London.

From 2008 to 2015, Nicholls was married to Chantal Brown.

In July 2017, Nicholls was badly injured while on holiday in Thailand after falling from a waterfall in Ko Samui. As his mobile phone was broken, he was left stranded at the bottom of the waterfall for three days, and only rescued by volunteer rescuers, police and medics after locals alerted police to the motorcycle he had travelled on, which lay abandoned nearby. He was later taken to hospital, suffering from broken legs and a shattered knee. Nicholls' agent said he was "recovering well".

In May 2021, Nicholls revealed that he suffered a stroke in 2018. The stroke caused him to experience deep depression, which led to him becoming addicted to dihydrocodeine and cocaine throughout 2020. He confirmed that he was attending Narcotics Anonymous meetings and was glad to be in recovery, stating that if he were to relapse again, he "would die".

== Filmography ==
Film
Year	Film	Role	Notes
1999	The Trench	Pte. Billy Macfarlane	
1999	The Clandestine Marriage	Richard Lovewell	
2000	Self Help	Greene	Short Film
2001	Goodbye Charlie Bright	Charlie Bright	
2002	High Speed	Ruben	Also known as The Ride and Joy-Rider
2004	If Only	Ian Wyndham	
2004	Bridget Jones: The Edge of Reason	Jed	
2008	Daylight Robbery	Chubby	
2008	Faintheart	Gary	
2012	Life Just Is	Bobby	
2013	A Long Way From Home	Mark	
2018	Genesis	Shane Frost	

Television
Year	Show	Role	Notes
1990	Children's Ward		1 episode
1994	Earthfasts	David	Series regular
1995	The Biz	Tim Marshall	Series regular
1996	Out of the Blue	Matt Pearson	1 episode
1996–1997, 2024	EastEnders	Joe Wicks	Series regular; 177 episodes
1998–1999	City Central	PC Terry Sydenham	Series regular
1999	Love Story	Seth	
1999	The Passion	Daniel	
2001	Table 12	Ol	1 episode
2001	Gimme Gimme Gimme	Himself	Comic Relief Special
2003	The Canterbury Tales	Jerome	1 episode: "The Wife of Bath"
2003	Blue Dove	Nick Weston	8 part series
2004	Gunpowder, Treason & Plot	Lord Darnley	2 part mini-series
2004	A Thing Called Love	Gary Scant	6 part series
2006	Hustle	Adam Rice	Episode: "Law and Corruption"
2006	Girls Aloud: Off the Record	Narrator	6 episodes
2007	Agatha Christie's Marple	Ted Latimer	Episode: "Towards Zero"
2007	Clapham Junction	Terry	Television film
2008	Fairy Tales	Connor Gruff	Episode: "Billy Goat"
2008	The Passion	Judas	4 part series
2008	Bonekickers	James	1 episode: "Army of God"
2008	Harley Street	Robert Fielding	6 part series
2011	Secret Diary of a Call Girl	Harry Keegan	3 episodes
2011	Candy Cabs	Tony McQueen	3 part series
2012–2013	Law & Order: UK	DS Sam Casey	Series regular
2012	Midsomer Murders	Dave Foxely	Episode: "A Rare Bird"
2012	Holby City	Simon Marshall	Recurring role
2012	Lake Placid: The Final Chapter	Ryan Loflin	Television film
2012	The Fear	Cal Beckett	Recurring role
2013	Great Night Out	Scott	1 episode
2015	The C-Word	Pete Lynch	Television film
2016	Death in Paradise	Jay Croker	1 episode
2016	Grantchester	Reggie Lawson	1 episode
2016	In the Club	Nathan Parker	Main role; 4 episodes
2017–2018	Ackley Bridge	Steve Bell	Main role; 15 episodes
2023–2024	Phoenix Rise	Carl Hopkins	Main role
