= List of EastEnders spin-off characters =

The following is a list of fictional characters that appeared in televised spin-offs of the BBC soap opera EastEnders, but have not appeared in EastEnders itself.

== CivvyStreet ==
=== Albert Beale ===
Albert Beale
- EastEnders character
- Portrayed by: Gary Olsen
- Introduced by: Julia Smith
- Book appearances: Home Fires Burning, Swings and Roundabouts
- Spin-off appearances: CivvyStreet (1988)
In-universe information
- Other names: Albert William Beale
- Occupation: Market stallholder (fruit and veg)
- Family: Beale
- Father: Unknown (Note: His first name was not revealed but, in CivvyStreet, his middle name was revealed to be Kenneth.) Kenneth Beale
- Wife: Lou Beale (1936–1965)
- Sons: Harry Beale; Ronnie Beale; Kenny Beale; Pete Beale
- Daughters: Maggie Flaherty; Dora Beale; Norma Beale; Pauline Fowler
- Grandsons: David Wicks; Ian Beale; Eamonn Flaherty; Conor Flaherty; John Flaherty; Tommy Flaherty; Mark Fowler; Martin Fowler
- Granddaughters: Elizabeth Beale; Michelle Fowler
- Aunts: Dolly Beale

Albert Beale appeared in the 1988 EastEnders spin-off CivvyStreet, played by Gary Olsen. He also appeared in the EastEnders novels by Hugh Miller. Albert and his wife Lou moved into 45 Albert Square shortly after their wedding. They had seven children. Their first child, Maggie, was conceived out of wedlock and adopted by an Irish family shortly after she was born. Albert and Lou had four sons (Kenny, Harry, Ronnie and Pete) and three more daughters (Dora, Norma and Pauline). Dora, Norma, Ronnie and Harry never appeared in the TV series. Albert fought in World War II, and was awarded the War Medal 1939–1945 — which is now in Ian Beale's possession. When Albert died in 1965, Ronnie inherited the stall but discovered he had a fatal heart defect and passed the stall onto Pete. Albert's three grandsons that appeared in the show, Mark Fowler, Ian Beale and Martin Fowler, all have Albert as a middle name.

=== Harry Beale ===
Harry Beale
- EastEnders character
- Portrayed by: Aaron Mason
- Introduced by: Julia Smith
- Book appearances: Home Fires Burning, Swings and Roundabouts
In-universe information
- Occupation: Hotelier
- Father: Albert Beale
- Mother: Lou Beale
- Brothers: Ronnie Beale; Kenny Beale; Pete Beale
- Sisters: Maggie Flaherty; Norma Beale; Pauline Fowler

Harry Beale appears in the 1988 EastEnders spin-off CivvyStreet, played by Aaron Mason. He also appears in the EastEnders novels by Hugh Miller. Harry is born to Albert and Louise Beale in 1936, their first legitimate child. He lives with his mother until his twenties, when he moves to Bradford in Yorkshire, and takes a job in a hotel. He is quickly promoted to hotel manager, but struggles to find a girlfriend. He eventually becomes an alcoholic, and regularly turns up to his mother's house in Albert Square, Walford drunk and unruly.

He eventually loses contact with Lou, after his drunken visits get worse. He sends flowers to his family's weddings and funerals.

=== Ronnie Beale ===
Ronnie Beale
- EastEnders character
- Portrayed by: Chase Marks
- Introduced by: Julia Smith
- Book appearances: Home Fires Burning, Swings and Roundabouts
In-universe information
- Occupation: Market trader
- Father: Albert Beale
- Mother: Lou Beale
- Brothers: Harry Beale; Kenny Beale; Pete Beale
- Sisters: Maggie Flaherty; Norma Beale; Pauline Fowler
- Wife: Gail Beale

Ronnie Beale appears in the 1988 EastEnders spin-off CivvyStreet, played by Chase Marks. He also appears in the EastEnders novels by Hugh Miller. Ronnie is born to Albert and Louise Beale, their third child, and second son. He lives with his mother until he marries a woman named Gail, then he moves into his own flat in Walford. The Beale family business, a fruit and vegetable stall in Bridge Street, is passed on to Ronnie upon the death of his father. In 1964, Ronnie discovers he has a heart condition that will eventually be fatal. He decides to move away from London so his family will not have to watch him die. He passes the stall on to his brother Pete, whom he had taken in after he had been homeless, after leaving his wife Pat. He and Gail move away, and it has been confirmed by the official EastEnders website that he has died since.

=== Other characters ===
- Lou's mother, played by Avis Bunnage, is the mother of Lou Beale and her siblings. She lives with her and her husband Albert at 45 Albert Square during the Second World War.
- Richard and Marty, played by Otto Jarman and Julian Hill, are two American soldiers that Lou Beale (Karen Meagher) and Ethel Skinner (Alison Bettles) dance and drink with. Lou invites Richard back to her house (45 Albert Square) but then feels guilty for not honoring her husband Albert Beale (Gary Olsen) and asks Richard to leave.
- Ray and Lil Sewell, played by Robert Putt and Frances Cuka, are the landlord and landlady of The Queen Victoria pub during World War II.
- William Skinner is played by Ian Brimble. William is the husband of Ethel Skinner. They begin dating during the Second World War and eventually marry. William dies in 1970 but Ethel outlives him by 30 years. They have no children.

== Return of Nick Cotton ==
=== Eddie Newton ===
Eddie Newton
- EastEnders character
- Portrayed by: Ian Sanders
- Introduced by: Mal Young; John Yorke
In-universe information
- Sisters: Zoe Newton
- Nephews: Ashley Cotton

Eddie "the Extinguisher" Newton appears in the episode Return of Nick Cotton, a special spin-off episode dedicated to the character of Nick Cotton (John Altman). He is the brother of Zoe Newton (Tara Ellis) who was once married to Nick Cotton. Nick tracks him down to North London where Eddie is selling extinguishers. Nick asks him for ex-wife Zoe and son Ashley's (Frankie Fitzgerald) whereabouts. Although Eddie is reluctant to tell him about Zoe's whereabouts he eventually reveals where she works when Nick threatens him with one of his extinguishers.

=== Colin ===
Colin
- EastEnders character
- Portrayed by: Jim Millea
- Introduced by: Mal Young; John Yorke
In-universe information
- Sons: Little Col

Colin appears in the episode Return of Nick Cotton, a special spin-off episode dedicated to the character of Nick Cotton (John Altman). Colin is a fellow inmate of Nick Cotton and become enemies after Nick cheats on a card game. Colin is in prison with his son Col for unknown reasons. On the day of Nick's release, Nick teases Colin for grassing to get his time reduced. Colin swears revenge on Nick and he and Col are released 10 weeks later and track Nick down to a squat in North London. After threatening the people in the squat, they reveal that Nick is going to find his wife Zoe Newton and son Ashley Cotton. They later arrive at Zoe's house where she, Nick and Ashley lock themselves in the bathroom after being threatened with a chainsaw. Zoe phones the police who arrive moments later and arrest Colin and Col.

=== Other characters ===
- Little Col, played by Gerard Bentall is the son of Colin. He and his father try to kill Nick Cotton after he cheated at a card game and told other prisoners that Colin is an informer. Bentall previously played a homeless youth in 1998.
- Mr Frensham, played by David Semar is the prison officer in HMP Blackmoor, where Nick is carrying out his sentence. When Nick is released Mr Frensham escorts Nick out of prison.
- Biscuit and Darren, played by Don Gilet and Norman Roberts are two lovers that both squat with Nick Cotton in an abandoned building. They tell Nick that his dream about his late father, Charlie (Christopher Hancock) is an omen and that something is going to happen to him. Biscuit was portrayed by Don Gilet who later went on to play another character, Lucas Johnson.

== Ricky & Bianca ==
=== Cassie ===
Cassie
- EastEnders character
- Portrayed by: Sally Ann Triplet
- Introduced by: Mal Young; John Yorke

Cassie appears in the two-part episode Ricky & Bianca a special spin-off episode that revolves around the characters Ricky Butcher (Sid Owen) and Bianca Jackson (Patsy Palmer). She is played by Sally Ann Triplet. Cassie is the girlfriend of Ricky and goes along with him to Manchester where Ricky tries to track down his ex-wife Bianca and his son Liam (Gavin and Mitchell Vaughan) to discuss Liam's custody. He then gets caught up with Bianca's problems when she steals money from her drug dealing boss. After he gets her out of trouble he has sex with Bianca. He then reveals he doesn't love Cassie and is still in love with Bianca. He ends his relationship with Cassie and just as it looks like Ricky and Bianca could be getting back together, Cassie manipulates Bianca into believing she and Ricky will never be happy together after all they have been through. Bianca then leaves Liam with Ricky and leaves in a taxi alone. Ricky subsequently returns to Walford and Cassie is not seen again.

=== Vince ===
Vince
- EastEnders character
- Portrayed by: Craig Charles
- Introduced by: Mal Young; John Yorke

Vince appears in the special spin-off episode Ricky & Bianca played by Craig Charles. He is the owner of a nightclub and a drug dealer who employs Bianca Jackson (Patsy Palmer) in his club. Bianca is going through financial difficulties and in desperation she steals money from Vince's office which turns out to be drug money. Bianca's ex-husband Ricky Butcher (Sid Owen) gets caught up in the middle of this when he and Bianca are held hostage by Vince when he discovers Bianca stole the money. Eventually Ricky and Bianca escape from him.

=== Other characters ===
- Gail, played by Nicola Murphy is a neighbour of Bianca, who babysits Liam when Bianca is at work.
- Gerry, played by Robert Shaw Cameron is Bianca's landlord, who demands she pays her overdue rent to him immediately.
- Moira, played by Joanne Gerrard is a nursery worker, who tells Bianca that as she has not paid for her son Liam to attend nursery his place has been given to someone else.
- David, played by Steven Finch is Bianca's college tutor that she has an affair with. He tells her it was not his decision and not understanding him, Bianca later discovers that the college is not allowing her to continue with her art course.
- Mrs. Burrows, played by Meryl Hampton is another of Bianca Butcher's college tutors. In a meeting she tells Bianca that she will not be allowed to continue with her course.
- Debbie, played by Lisa Rigby is a receptionist in the college where Bianca is studying her art course.
- Dean, played by Dean Andrews is the manager in the Viper Bar and is asked by Bianca for an advance in her wages. Dean refuse to give her the money unless she performs a sexual favour for him. Bianca declines telling him she is not that desperate.
- Sophie, played by Kate Ford is a student studying the art course as Bianca Butcher. She is asked by Bianca to look after Liam Butcher but she tells Bianca she needs to be somewhere.
- Brian, played by Damian Christian is a camp barman that works in the viper bar. He tells Bianca that he heard that she had carried out sexual favour for Dean.
- Harry, played by an uncredited actor is one of Vince's henchmen that he tells to get a hammer to break one of Ricky's legs.

== Dot's Story ==
=== Gwen ===
Gwen
- EastEnders character
- Portrayed by: Gwenllian Davies; Eve Myles (flashback)
- Introduced by: John Yorke
In-universe information
- Husband: Will
- Sons: Ewan

Gwen is a fictional character in a special episode of the BBC soap opera EastEnders, played by Gwenllian Davies in the episode, Dot's Story, but played by Eve Myles in flashbacks within the episode.

Gwen takes care of Dot Cotton (Tallulah Pitt-Brown) during World War II, when Dot is evacuated to the countryside. In the present Dot goes to visit Gwen who is sick and frail. Dot refers to her as Auntie Gwen, in EastEnders episode 5447 (23 February 2017) Dot tells Sian Davies that she only washes her face with soap and water and that her Auntie Gwen swears that it will keep you looking young.

=== Will ===
Will
- EastEnders character
- Portrayed by: Dafydd Emyr (flashback)
- Introduced by: John Yorke
In-universe information
- Wife: Gwen

Will is a fictional character in a special episode of the BBC soap opera EastEnders, played by Dafydd Emyr in the episode, Dot's Story, but only in flashbacks within the episode.

Will takes care of Dot Cotton (Tallulah Pitt-Brown) when she comes to stay with him and his wife Gwen and he gave her a toy soldier as he thought they would be looking after a boy rather than a girl.

=== Ewan ===
Ewan
- EastEnders character
- Portrayed by: Rhys Parry Jones
- Introduced by: John Yorke
In-universe information
- Mother: Gwen

Ewan is a fictional character in a special episode of the BBC soap opera EastEnders, played by Rhys Parry Jones in the episode, Dot's Story.

Ewan is the son of Gwen in the present day who visit Dot and ask her to come back to wales to visit his mother Gwen as she is ill and wants to see her before she dies.

=== Jenny Morgan ===
Jenny Morgan
- EastEnders character
- Portrayed by: Ruth Jones
- Introduced by: John Yorke

Jenny Morgan is a fictional character in a special episode of the BBC soap opera EastEnders, played by Ruth Jones in the episode, Dot's Story.

Jenny is a home nurse who looks after Gwen, Dot plays matchmaker and at the end of the episode both Jenny and Ewan admit they have feeling for each other.

== Pat and Mo: Ashes to Ashes ==
=== Stan Porter ===
Stan Porter
- EastEnders character
- Portrayed by: Sam Kelly; Callum Dixon (flashback)
- Introduced by: Mal Young; Louise Berridge
In-universe information
- Father: Sidney Porter
- Mother: Joyce Porter
- Brothers: Colin Porter
- Sisters: Mo Harris
- Aunts: Hilda
- Nephews: Billy Harris
- Nieces: Viv Slater; Jean Harris

Stanley "Stan" Porter is a fictional character in a special episode of the BBC soap opera EastEnders, played by Sam Kelly in the episode, EastEnders: Pat and Mo, but played by Callum Dixon in flashbacks within the episode.

Stan is born and brought up near Walford with his sister, Mo. He lives near his sister Mo, her husband Jimmy, and Jimmy's sister Pat. He is close with both Jimmy and Pat, and it is even suggested that he may have even had a brief romance with Pat. He is known as a dodgy salesman, once robbing an undertaker's shop for silk used to line coffins, and selling it as fabric to make dresses. Stan is familiar with the Slater family and is close with Charlie Slater. He eventually goes to prison, in Stepney but it is unknown what for.

He attends the planting of a tree in memory of Jimmy Harris, his brother-in-law, after getting out of prison in 2004. He tells a bus driver that he had "done life for murder", but it is unclear whether this is the truth.

=== Jimmy Harris ===
Jimmy Harris
- EastEnders character
- Portrayed by: Alex King (flashback)
- Introduced by: Mal Young; Louise Berridge
In-universe information
- Mother: Lydia Harris
- Brothers: Geoff Harris
- Sisters: Pat Butcher; Joan Harris
- Wife: Mo Harris (backstory)
- Sons: Billy Harris
- Daughters: Jean Harris
- Adoptive daughters: Viv Slater
- Granddaughters: Joanne
- Aunts: Mabel
- Nephews: David Wicks; Simon Wicks

James "Jimmy" Harris is a fictional character in a spin-off episode of the BBC soap opera EastEnders, played by Alex King in flashbacks in the episode, EastEnders: Pat and Mo.

Jimmy leaves school at the age of 15 and the following year goes into the army. He is close with his younger sister Pat and is strongly against her teenage affair with Frank Butcher. During army leave in 1958, he meets and falls in love with Mo Porter, Pat's close friend, who at the time has a six-year-old daughter Viv. After a whirlwind romance, Jimmy proposes to Mo during a walk in the woods, and leaves the army to be with her. At first, he is surprised by the news that Mo has a daughter, but quickly he promises Viv and Mo a trip to the beach when he is on leave. They marry in 1959, and have two children, Billy and Jean. Jimmy becomes preoccupied with his family and Pat feels neglected by him; she blames Mo for this and begins to resent her. Drinking heavily, Pat turns to prostitution to fund her habit. Concerned, Jimmy diverts his attention back to Pat, leaving a neglected Mo to begin an affair with club owner Tony Cattani, who is also Pat's pimp. Their secret tryst is discovered by Pat, who promptly tells Jimmy, but when Mo denies it, Jimmy disowns Pat.

In the 1970s, Jimmy develops terminal cancer. Determined to make peace with Pat, Jimmy writes her a letter saying that he wants to make amends. He instructs Mo to post it, but she never does, and Jimmy dies in April 1979, aged only 38, without ever reconciling with Pat. Pat is not informed of Jimmy's death or invited to his funeral. In 2004, Mo and Pat attend the planting of a tree in Jimmy's memory to commemorate the 25th anniversary of his death.

=== Other characters ===
- Tony Cattani, played by Vas Constanti is the owner of a nightclub that Pat and Mo regularly visit. He tries to force Pat into prostitution and blackmail Mo into having sex with him.
- Mr. Hagan, played by David Durham
- Dermot, played by Howard Goorney

== Slaters in Detention ==
Slaters in Detention is a 2003 DVD spin-off of EastEnders. The following characters featured:

| Character | Actor |
|---|---|
| Kat Slater | Jessie Wallace |
| Little Mo Mitchell | Kacey Ainsworth |
| Lynne Hobbs | Elaine Lordan |
| Zoe Slater | Michelle Ryan |
| Mo Harris | Laila Morse |
| Charlie Slater | Derek Martin |
| Belinda Peacock | Leanne Lakey |
| Sgt. Bob Green | David Fleeshman |
| PC Dennis Cogan | Andrew French |
| PC Jim Sellers | Michael Begley |

== Last Tango in Walford ==
Last Tango in Walford is a 2010 DVD spin-off of EastEnders. The following characters featured:

| Character | Actor |
|---|---|
| Ricky Butcher | Sid Owen |
| Bianca Jackson | Patsy Palmer |
| Tiffany Butcher | Maisie Smith |
| Carol Jackson | Lindsey Coulson |
| Pat Evans | Pam St Clement |
| Whitney Dean | Shona McGarty |
| Liam Butcher | James Forde |
| Morgan Butcher | Devon Higgs |
| Janine Butcher | Charlie Brooks |
| Stacey Slater | Lacey Turner |
| Phil Mitchell | Steve McFadden |
| Max Branning | Jake Wood |
| Ian Beale | Adam Woodyatt |
| Ryan Malloy | Neil McDermott |
| Carla | Stella Maris |
| Mrs. Lambert | Leila Hoffman |
| Erin | Erin Gavin |
