= Pat Butcher =

Fictional character from EastEnders

- EastEnders character
- Pam St Clement as Pat Butcher (2008)
- Portrayed by: Pam St Clement; Emma Cooke (2004 flashback)
- Duration: 1986–2012, 2016, 2025
- First appearance: Episode 138; 12 June 1986
- Last appearance: Episode 7246; 23 December 2025
- Created by: Tony Holland
- Introduced by: Julia Smith (1986); Dominic Treadwell-Collins (2016); Ben Wadey (2025)
- Book appearances: Swings and Roundabouts
- Spin-off appearances: Dimensions in Time (1993); Pat and Mo (2004); Last Tango in Walford (2010); The Ghosts of Ian Beale (2014)
- Emma Cooke as Pat Butcher in Pat and Mo (2004)
In-universe information
- Other names: Pat Harris; Pat Beale; Pat Wicks; Pat Evans; Fat Pat
- Occupation: Prostitute; Barmaid; Businesswoman; Pub landlady; B&B landlady; Cleaner; Waitress; Cab driver; Bookmaker
- Mother: Lydia Harris
- Brothers: Jimmy Harris; Geoff Harris
- Sisters: Joan Harris
- Husband: Pete Beale (backstory); Brian Wicks (until 1989); Frank Butcher (1989–1996); Roy Evans (1996–2003)
- Sons: David Wicks; Simon Wicks
- Stepsons: Ricky Butcher; Barry Evans; Nathan Williams
- Stepdaughters: Diane Butcher; Clare Butcher; Janine Butcher
- Grandsons: Joe Wicks; Steven Beale
- Granddaughters: Bianca Jackson; Karen Wicks
- Other relatives: Liam Butcher; Tiffany Butcher; Morgan Butcher; AJ Branning; Holly Wicks; Whitney Dean (adoptive)

Pat Butcher (also Harris, Wicks and Evans) is a fictional character from the BBC soap opera EastEnders, played by Pam St Clement from 12 June 1986, just over a year after the show first aired, until her departure on 1 January 2012. Pat was also portrayed by Emma Cooke in a soap 'bubble', Pat and Mo: Ashes to Ashes, delving into her past with sister-in-law Mo Harris (Laila Morse), which aired in 2004. The character was killed-off on 1 January 2012, shortly after being diagnosed with pancreatic cancer. Her funeral was on 13 January 2012. Pat was one of the longest serving characters on the show, appearing for 25 years and six months. She returned, along with other women from Ian Beale's (Adam Woodyatt) past, in a concussion-related dream sequence for a Children in Need special on 14 November 2014. She also made a return as a spirit for Peggy Mitchell's (Barbara Windsor) suicide on 17 May 2016. On 13 November 2025, it was announced that St Clement would reprise the role of Pat for a one-off special episode as part of Nigel Bates' (Paul Bradley) dementia storyline. She returned on 22 December as a hallucination to Nigel, alongside Barry Evans (Shaun Williamson) and Debbie Bates (Nicola Duffett), and departed in the following episode.

== Creation and development ==
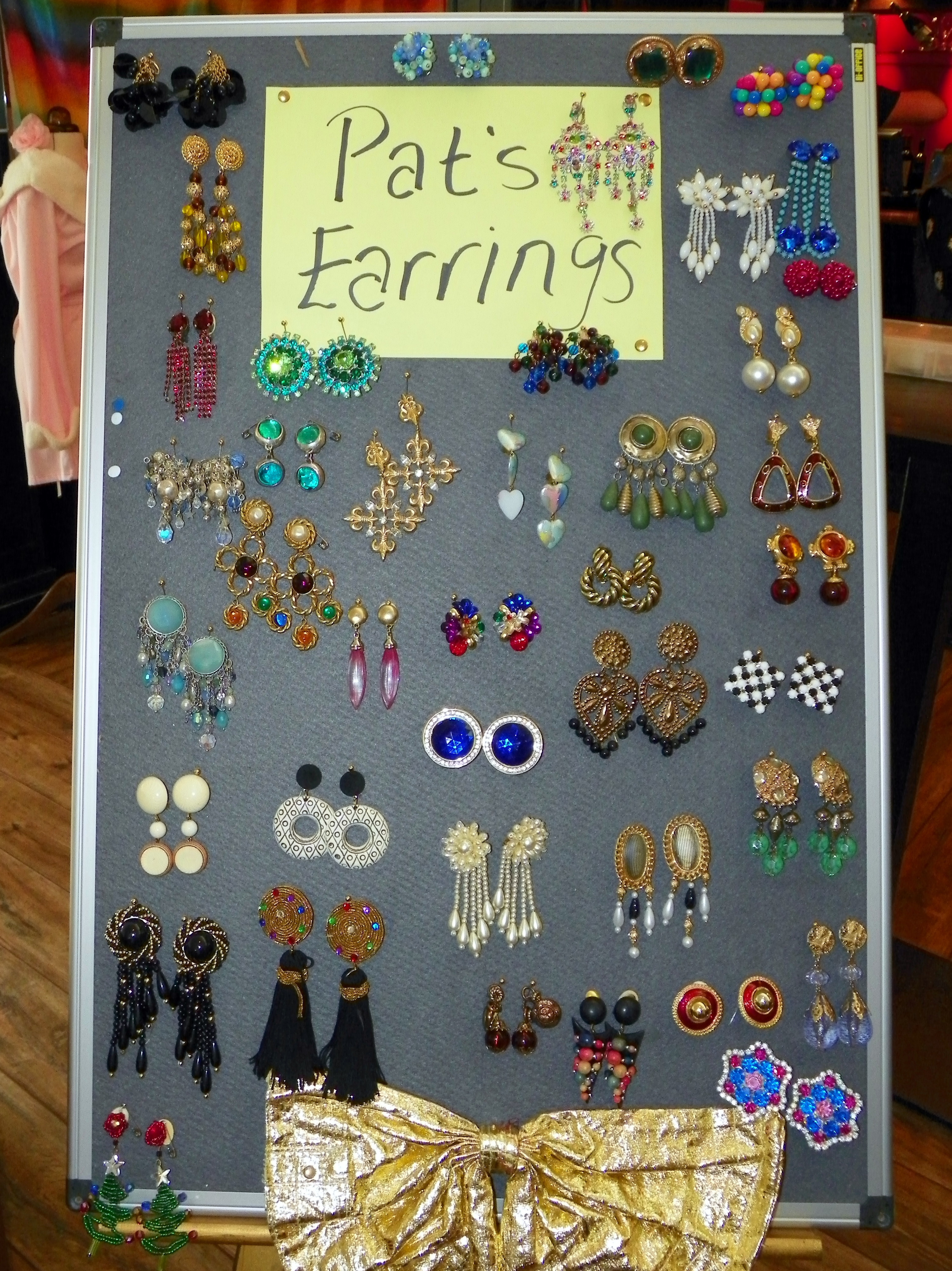
A selection of earrings worn by the EastEnders character Pat Butcher, played by Pam St Clement, on display at the EastEnders Meet and Greet event.

The character of Pat was conceived by the creators of EastEnders, Tony Holland and Julia Smith, in 1984. Although not one of the serial's original protagonists, Pat is referred to in the character outline of Pete Beale, who appeared on-screen in EastEnders' first episode, as written by Smith and Holland in their book, EastEnders: The Inside Story: "[Pete] married very young to Pat—it turned out to be a total disaster. They were too young, rushing into a difficult life for all the wrong reasons, and truthfully, [Pat] was a vicious shrew...[Pete] divorced [Pat] and married Kathy when he was 24...His two sons by his first marriage are nineteen and twenty and he hardly sees them..."

Pat was first seen on-screen in June 1986, over a year after the show debuted. The character's introduction was the result of a deliberate policy "to add an extra edge of toughness to the show." Prior to this point, Holland and Smith had begun to feel that EastEnders was starting to get "a bit soft". During a meeting with scriptwriters, the programme makers decided to try to recapture some of the soap's "original grittiness that seemed to be getting lost in its own success". Thus the character of Pat was introduced to "add a new hardness to the atmosphere."

Pat, played by actress Pam St Clement, was initially introduced on a three-episode trial basis. She was given an extensive backstory, heavily intertwined with various focal characters within the serial, including all of the Beale and Fowler family, who mostly disliked her, particularly her ex-husband Pete Beale (Peter Dean), her son Simon Wicks (Nick Berry), and Pete's mother Lou Beale (Anna Wing). In addition, she was an old friend of Angie Watts (Anita Dobson), a former lover of Angie's husband Den (Leslie Grantham) and, as a supposed former resident of Walford, she was known to many of the other regular characters such as Dot Cotton (June Brown) and Ethel Skinner (Gretchen Franklin).

The character's initial three-episode stint marked the beginning of what has been described as one of the soap's most complicated storylines, the paternity of Simon Wicks. Pat immediately "threw a spanner in the works" by telling Pete that he was not Simon's biological father, as she had previously claimed. After causing havoc Pat then disappeared; however, she was reintroduced later in the year, returning as a regular character, barmaid of The Queen Victoria public house. St. Clement had reservations about returning to the soap. In 1995 she told The Independent, "I couldn't envisage how this character, who creates absolute havoc everywhere she goes and is not at home with herself or with anybody else in the Square, could possibly fit in". However, she was persuaded to continue by producer Julia Smith, who said: "'We've only seen one layer of the onion skin—the defensiveness—now we'll start to peel away more and get to the vulnerability that lies behind it'."

=== Friendship with Peggy Mitchell ===
In 1998, Pat and her friend Peggy develop a feud with each other after Peggy has an affair with Frank Butcher. An EastEnders insider said: "Viewers will see the lot – tears, screaming and fighting. The romance has brought the studios to a standstill," said the insider. "There are TV screens around Elstree where staff can see what is being filmed and it has literally stopped people in their tracks. For the two days it was being filmed, staff on the lot talked about nothing else. Frank and Peggy are two of the show's strongest, most popular characters and the writers have hit on the idea of bringing Pat, another of the show's big names, in on the plot. Devoting a whole episode to just two characters is a tactic which has proved successful in the past. We have used it for Michelle and Lofty and also for Dot Cotton and Lou Beale. St. Clement and Barbara are both first-class actresses and everyone at the BBC feels they will carry the explosive episode off with flying colours."

The scenes showing the characters' first fight had to be cut in order to be broadcast before the 9pm watershed; they were reported as "powerful" and "set to be one of the most impressive episodes of all time". Barbara Windsor told the Sunday Mirror: "The writer didn't want a namby-pamby cat fight between two silly girls. We were throwing chairs and bottles and the adrenaline was at a high. When I saw the programme I couldn't believe how good it was. Pam and I were really proud."

=== Departure and death ===
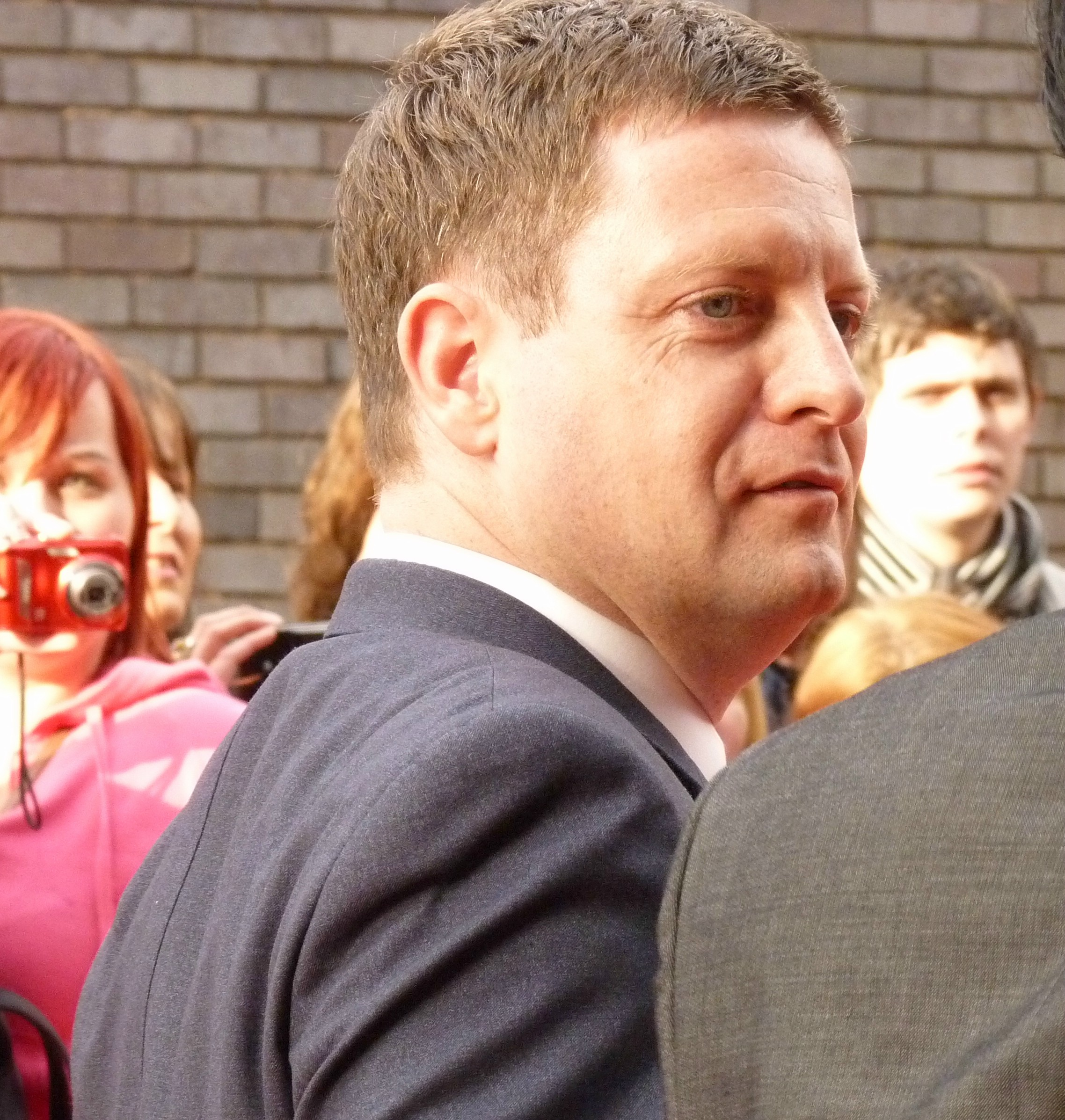
Executive Producer Bryan Kirkwood (pictured) stated that St. Clement's departure would be a "fitting" storyline.

On 7 July 2011, it was announced that St. Clement had quit EastEnders. The actress revealed that she wanted to try other things, saying "I have enjoyed 25 and a half wonderful years in EastEnders creating the character of Pat but feel it's time to hang up her earrings. Leaving the EastEnders 'family' will be akin to a bereavement. But I'm looking forward to the other work and life opportunities that I will have the time to pursue." Pat would leave later that year, and executive producer Bryan Kirkwood said her departure would be a "fitting" storyline. Pat's son David Wicks returned for her departure storyline.

Pat was killed off in the special New Year's Day episode. On 31 December 2011, it was announced that Pat would be getting her own exit theme. EastEnders music composer Simon May reworked the tune to create "Pat's Theme". An EastEnders insider told Digital Spy: "It's only right that as we say goodbye to the iconic Pat Evans we pay tribute to such a character with a wonderfully touching special theme tune. As we say farewell to a legend of over 26 years, we welcome in what will be a truly remarkable New Year in E20 by adding the Olympic Park into the opening title sequence."

Barbara Windsor, who played Peggy Mitchell, predicted that Pat would be "sorely missed" by fans. Speaking of Pat's exit, Windsor told This Morning: "Oh, I can't bear it – Pam! And she will be sorely missed – more than I was missed in the show, because she could go to anybody – any family she could go into. I am devastated. She definitely wanted to leave, but I don't know if she wanted to be killed off – that's the chance you have to take," Windsor continued. "I was positive that I was going to go up in a load of flames with The Vic – I thought that was going to happen, but of course it didn't. With Pam, I was very, very surprised, because she could always go back. But she's accepted it now and she'll have a new life."

St. Clement stated that she did not want her character to die, but said her final scenes were "fantastic". St. Clement commented: "Simon Ashdown had this idea for the character, which fitted in with her history in a sense," she explained. "They said, 'This is how we'd like it to happen – we think it's a fitting end and tribute to the character'. And as far as I can say, I read the script and I thought, 'Oh, this is fantastic – it's every actor's dream'. And I have to say, it also challenged me in a way that I hadn't been challenged. It was moving, it was challenging and it was a script that I needed to get my teeth into. The script, the performances, the direction – it all turned out to be a fantastic ensemble piece, if you like… Everybody was pulling in, everybody was doing the most wonderful performances and it was fantastic."

St. Clement said she was "moved" by the Farewell Pat tribute. Speaking on Daybreak, St. Clement explained: "I wasn't going to watch [the final episode] with anybody – I was going to record it and then watch it in a darkened room somewhere, where I could be terribly critical and jump about saying, 'Stupid woman – why did you play it like that?' But everybody said, 'Oh no, sit down'. I said, 'I don't want to disturb you all' – but I did make myself behave! And I was quite dispassionate, actually. The strange thing is, after I read the script, I was very moved by it. But as soon as I started working on it, I think everybody did start getting quite emotional – but I couldn't. Even about myself leaving – people in the cast would come up and say, 'How do you feel?' and I'd say, 'I can't go there, I can't think about that, because the work's not finished'. The strange thing is, the only thing that moved me was the Farewell Pat programme. Which is strange, but I suppose that was personal in a sense."

St. Clement also explained the experience of filming her final episode: "It was a great challenge, that script," she commented. "I looked at it and thought, 'Oh, heck, how do I give light and shade to something where somebody is actually dying?' And some of the scenes could have been interpreted as being somewhat similar with Janine and David. So I had to make them different – but I had to make them different within the confines of the illness."

It was later confirmed that EastEnders would air a special tribute episode to Pat after her funeral episode on 13 January 2012. An EastEnders insider commented: "Pat is EastEnders – she was the heart and soul of the show and bosses have pulled out all the stops for her funeral. Not only is the episode extra long, with plenty of nods to the iconic lady, it really is the end of the earring. We are hoping that everyone dons their biggest and tackiest earrings to mark one of the saddest days in the history of Walford." Co-star Lindsey Coulson said that Pat's departure was a "real-loss". She told This Morning: "They were really difficult scenes to play, because we didn't want Pam to leave," Coulson explained. "So apart from not wanting to lose the wonderful character of Pat, we were mourning the loss of Pam. You don't see everybody all the time [at EastEnders] at all, and sometimes you can go for months without seeing somebody. And most of the time you're on this big wheel and when people leave, you go, 'Oh, that's really sad', but you get back on. But actually Pam is a real loss up there."

Former EastEnders cast member Martin Kemp said that the decision for Pat to leave was the "right" thing to do. He told Bang Showbiz: "I still watch EastEnders from time to time. I did quite a few scenes with Pam, I remember we spent three or four days locked in a cellar once so we had quite some scenes. She's a great actress, I'm sure she'll go on to other things. I think she's making the right move, it's nice to spread your wings a bit. Although viewers will miss her I don't think anyone is bigger than the show, it doesn't matter who comes or who goes. When I was there I always thought the star of the show was and always will be the pub, The Queen Vic. Everything else is an extra around it."

== Storylines ==
=== Backstory ===
Pat is the youngest of four children. Her sister, Joan, had Down syndrome, and was sent to a mental institution when Pat was four. Joan married Michael, who also had Down's. Their mother, Lydia, disowned Joan and claimed she had died at the age of 22.

After leaving school at 15, Pat unsuccessfully tried to become a model. She and her best friend, Mo Porter (Laila Morse), entered a beauty contest in Clacton at 16, winning the title of "Miss Butlins". There she met Frank Butcher (Mike Reid), who was holidaying with his girlfriend, June Simmonds. Frank was besotted with Pat, and they slept together. Frank was the first of what would be many lovers in Pat's life, and they began a love affair. However, June became pregnant with Frank's child, so Frank married her, breaking Pat's heart. Pat and Frank would meet up from time to time, and on each occasion the affair would be rekindled, but Frank would not leave June. Pat began working for shady club owner Tony Cattani (Vas Constanti), who got her involved in prostitution. This shamed her family, particularly her brother Jimmy (Alex King), and their relationship suffered. When Pat discovered that Mo, now Jimmy's wife, had slept with Tony, she informed her brother; Mo denied it, and Jimmy subsequently disowned Pat. While working as a prostitute, Pat was offered more money to work for up-and-coming gangster Johnny Allen (Billy Murray). Pat then worked as a well-known woman of the underworld for many years.

Pat embarked on numerous relationships. She had flings with Den Watts (Leslie Grantham) and Kenny Beale (Michael Attwell), both restless men who were unwilling to settle down with her. Kenny's younger brother Pete (Peter Dean) proved more reliable; he married Pat when he thought she was pregnant by him—a false alarm which his mother Lou (Anna Wing) believed was Pat's ploy to trap her son. While they were together, Pat had two sons, David (Michael French) and Simon (Nick Berry), who Pete believed to be his. Yet Pat could not settle down and embarked on an affair with Brian Wicks (Leslie Schofield). Pete eventually left her and they divorced. Soon after this, Pat married Brian and he took on responsibility of her two sons. They left Walford due to David's feud with fellow schoolboy Derek Branning (Terence Beesley/Jamie Foreman) who terrorised the entire family because his sister Carol (Lindsey Coulson) had a relationship with David to the point where he got her pregnant. They moved to Romford, and Pat stayed with Brian until 1986, when he started physically abusing her.

=== 1986–2012 ===
Pat comes to Walford in June 1986 to tell Pete that he is not Simon's father. Many arguments erupt, but Lou steps in to convince a devastated Pete that Simon is his. When Pat starts work as a barmaid in The Queen Victoria pub later that year, she finds that Lou thinks Simon is Kenny's son, following an affair, and she is adamant that Pat should keep this secret and not upset her close-knit family. However, Pete's twin sister Pauline Fowler (Wendy Richard) overhears and tells Pete everything.

Pat lives up to her promiscuous reputation and, with encouragement from Mehmet Osman (Haluk Bilginer), ends the year prostituting herself. Animosity between Pat and Pete continues. When Pat is assaulted in February 1987 — left unconscious and close to death in the middle of the Square — Pete is prime suspect in the police investigation. He is later cleared when the real culprit, the Walford Attacker, is caught.

The arrival of Kenny in 1988 brings the question of Simon's parentage to the fore once again. Pat tells Simon and the Beale brothers that she does not know who the father is, adding further confusion. She also says that Den is a possibility, but later rules Den out and demands that he has sex with her, or she will tell people that he is the father. That July, a dying Lou pleads with Pat to finally tell Simon the truth. Pat reveals that Brian, the man that Simon believed to be his stepfather, is actually his biological father.

Following Lou's death, Pat forms a close friendship with Pete's second wife Kathy Beale (Gillian Taylforth). The pair were formerly foes, but find themselves having had a common bond, with the dominance of both Lou and Pete in their lives. As such, Pat gradually elevates herself as a surrogate mother and close relative of Pete and Kathy's son Ian (Adam Woodyatt).

Frank comes back into Pat's life in 1987. June has died and he and Pat reunite, taking over the tenancy of The Queen Vic. Pat has a hard time in her role as the stepmother to Frank's children, particularly with his troublesome youngest daughter Janine (Rebecca Michael). On 22 June 1989, Pat and Frank marry in Cockney style by driving out of Albert Square in a horse-drawn cart.

By the end of 1989, the Butchers have moved from The Queen Vic to the B&B across the Square, which Pat runs while Frank opens a used car lot. Despite family and marital problems, Frank and Pat are happy until 1992 when they begin to struggle financially, forcing them to sell the B&B. Pat tries to turn their fortunes around by starting a cab firm, PatCabs. However, disaster strikes on Christmas Eve that year, when Pat — doing a short run for a regular customer — hits a teenage girl who later dies from her injuries. She struggles to cope with the guilt, particularly when confronted by the girl's mother. When breathalysed, she is found to be just over the limit. When Pat appears in court several months later, she is imprisoned for six months.

Pat returns in the autumn, but by then the Butchers are in financial ruin. In desperation, Frank pays local hardman Phil Mitchell (Steve McFadden) to torch the car lot in an insurance scam. When this goes wrong and a homeless boy dies, Frank has a breakdown and in April 1994, he abandons Pat and his children, leaving Pat destitute and heartbroken. Eventually, Frank's eldest daughter Diane (Sophie Lawrence) brings news that Frank is alive and so Pat begins getting on with her life.

Local car dealer Roy Evans (Tony Caunter) arrives in Albert Square and is attracted to Pat, but early attempts to woo her get him nothing but refusals. Pat later softens, and goes on a cruise with him, although she makes it clear that sex is not on offer. Her carnal abstinence is a blessing for Roy, as he later admits he is impotent and can offer nothing more than platonic love. Pat is relieved to discover that, for once, a man wants something from her other than sex.

In November 1995, Roy moves in with Pat, but on Christmas Day, Frank returns. Pat finds it hard to contain her rage and emotion when she sees her estranged husband, but despite him stirring up old feelings, she chooses to stay with Roy and they marry in 1996. Pat and Roy weather money problems, Roy's ill-health, and his depression, brought on by his jealousy of Pat and Frank's shared past, which almost makes him commit suicide in 1998. Pat finally convinces Roy that it was him she wants, although she finds it hard to let go of Frank completely. Frank goes on to marry Phil's mother Peggy (Barbara Windsor), but Frank begins to have second thoughts upon realising that he still loves Pat.

In 2000, Pat and Frank go on a holiday with their respective spouses, alongside fellow couple Terry Raymond (Gavin Richards) and his wife Irene Raymond (Roberta Taylor) in Spain. During this time, Frank seduces Pat, and she tries to end the affair; however, when Frank turns up on her doorstep with no clothes and a comedy bow-tie on his neck, she realises that she had never stopped loving him either. The duo continue their affair, and eventually decide to elope to Manchester. The couple are due to depart on Guy Fawkes Night in November 2000, when Pat has second thoughts.

However, it is too late, as Peggy has already found Frank's farewell letter, and shames the cheating duo by reading it to the entire pub before slapping Frank and Pat. Peggy throws Frank out, and he leaves Walford alone. Roy is initially willing to forgive Pat, and explains that certain things have got to change, but his son Barry (Shaun Williamson), alerts him to a suitcase containing massage oils, along with fishnet stockings and a red Basque, which Pat was planning to take with her for Frank. Enraged by her betrayal, Roy throws Pat out and she is left penniless and homeless. Roy later asks Pat for a divorce.

In February 2001, Pat decides to join Simon in New Zealand, though Roy follows her to the airport and tells her that he wants to be with her, despite Barry's objections. Grateful that Roy has given her a second chance, Pat is adamant that she will not mess things up again. This starts off well throughout the rest of 2001 and the entirety of 2002, during which Pat reunites with her stepson and Frank's son Ricky (Sid Owen) in the process.

However, in March 2003, Roy discovers that Pat knew about Ricky having an affair with Barry's wife Natalie (Lucy Speed) not long ago. Roy believes that Pat has again chosen to support Frank's offspring over his own, and the stress causes Roy's second and fatal heart attack. Roy dies intestate, leaving Pat bereft and homeless, as Barry — beneficiary of Roy's estate — evicts her, despite Pat's efforts to support Barry and help rebuild his life after the double blow of his marriage break-up and the death of his father.

Pat moves into a bedsit. Janine (now played by Charlie Brooks) marries Barry and plans to con him out of all of his money and possessions. The day after the wedding, Janine admits everything and pushes Barry down a cliff to his death. She later brags about it to a disgusted Pat and starts to bully Ian's estranged wife Laura (Hannah Waterman), who is living with Pat at her house. When Laura accidentally falls down the stairs and dies, Janine is arrested on suspicion of murder. Pat, who is Janine's alibi, lies to the police, and so Janine is implicated as revenge for Barry's death.

Pat is given a job at the bookies by the square's crime kingpin Andy Hunter (Michael Higgs) in 2004. They develop a rapport, until Pat finds out that Andy has arranged for his employee Paul Trueman (Gary Beadle) to be killed in retribution for attempting to entrap him to the police. She is nevertheless surprised when Andy is murdered by his gangland rival Johnny Allen (Billy Murray) in 2005, before later finding out that Andy has left her his house in his will. It is at this point that it transpires that Pat and Johnny are old acquaintances, as she used to work for Johnny in the past. She immediately suspects him of killing Andy, but Johnny convinces her otherwise and the pair attend Andy's funeral.

However, Pat eventually learns from Johnny's henchman Jake (Joel Beckett) that in the end Johnny did kill Andy, and has also ordered Jake's brother Danny (Jake Maskall) to murder Sharon's step-brother-turned-husband Dennis Rickman (Nigel Harman).

Towards the end of 2005, Pat is summoned as a witness for the prosecution at Janine's trial in December that year. She is later surprised to see that Frank has returned, and the pair greet each other. They later have sex, but Pat soon realises that his primary motive is to convince her to alter her testimony at Janine's trial. At first, Pat refuses, to the point where she tells Frank that Janine killed Barry, but eventually relents. Afterwards, Frank tells Pat that he will always love her and the two reconcile, before parting ways one last time.

In February 2006, missing male company, Pat begins flirting with Paul Trueman's adopted father Patrick (Rudolph Walker), who is married but unable to resist the chance of a casual fling with Pat. Soon enough, Patrick's young assistant Stacey Slater (Lacey Turner) sees them together and tells Patrick's wife, Yolande (Angela Wynter) about it; this ends the affair, and causes Yolande to resent Pat as a result.

In August 2007, Pat discovers that her mother lied about the date of her sister Joan's death. She and a kind stranger, Len Harker (Christopher Ellison), break into Joan's care home and learn that Joan died only a few years earlier after marrying a man with Down syndrome. Pat is touched to discover that Joan often spoke of how much she loved her.

In March 2008, Pat announces she is leaving Walford for Spain, but gets news that Frank has died of throat cancer. She is devastated, and despite initial feuding, she and Peggy support each other through Frank's funeral. Pat opts to remain in Walford when her granddaughter Bianca Jackson (Patsy Palmer) turns to her for help soon after, moving in with her four children.

Having reconciled with one grandchild, Pat severs her bond with another when she discovers Ian's stepson Steven Beale (Aaron Sidwell) is in hiding with his runaway half-sister, Lucy Beale (Melissa Suffield). Pat threatens to tell Ian the truth, and is hit by a car driven by Roxy Mitchell (Rita Simons) whilst trying to apprehend Steven. She spends time in hospital, where Steven attempts to smother her before she can tell Ian. His plan fails, and Lucy returns to Ian.

Pat suffers a heart attack in January 2010 amidst increasing animosity with Janine. It is revealed that she has an underlying condition and needs a pacemaker, but refuses to have the operation. Janine persuades Pat to have the pacemaker fitted, and she makes a full recovery.

Disgusted with the litter in Albert Square, Peggy and Pat both decide to run for the council. They are interviewed by journalist Harvey Freeman (Martin Jarvis), but eventually they both pull out of the election. Harvey secretly woos them both, causing various rows between the women when they find out. They both finally unite against Harvey and humiliate him in punishment.

Pat and Peggy's friendship strengthens, so Pat is hurt when Peggy leaves Walford without saying goodbye, upset to lose her best friend. When Pat discovers that Janine stabbed herself in order to frame Stacey after making the discovery that she killed Peggy's late former husband Archie (Larry Lamb), she denounces Janine once more and goes to New Zealand to visit Simon. She returns in April to find that Bianca is in prison and that her adopted great-granddaughter Whitney Dean (Shona McGarty) is missing, although she is relieved when Whitney returns home shortly after.

When Pat discovers that Ricky and Janine's maternal grandmother, Lydia Simmonds (Margaret Tyzack and Heather Chasen), is staying with Janine, she believes that Janine is only interested in Lydia's inheritance, and Janine jokingly admits this to Pat, although a close bond soon forms between Janine and Lydia. When Lydia dies in the night, Pat comforts Janine, but later turns on her, believing that she killed Lydia to get her money, despite the fact Janine had already seen the will and knew that Lydia was donating her money to charity.

When the police take Janine in for questioning over Lydia's death, Janine believes it was Pat who phoned them, although it is later revealed that it was Whitney's half-brother Ryan Malloy (Neil McDermott) who made the call. Pat is still adamant that Janine murdered Lydia, which causes an emotional argument. When it is discovered that Lydia has changed her will and left her whole estate to Janine, Pat persuades Lydia's son Norman (George Layton) to contest the will. He initially agrees, but after Janine agrees to share the money with Ricky, Pat convinces Norman to change his mind. Although Norman likes Pat and wants to see her again, Pat is oblivious to this.

When Pat discovers that Simon is about to lose his home in New Zealand, she fails to get a loan to help him because of her age. Norman offers to help, and organises a loan for her. After speaking to her great-grandson Liam (James Forde) about it, Pat decides she likes Norman; they kiss, and she asks him to stay. The next day, Norman tells Patrick that he regularly earns commission organising loans for people.

Patrick then warns Pat about this, and once Pat finds out that the terms of the loan mean that if she misses a payment she could lose her house, she rejects Norman, tells him to leave, and says she never wants to see him again. Derek Branning subsequently arrives in Walford and recognises Pat. She runs away, but he chases her and forces his way into her home. Pat is fearful of Derek, and he taunts her, asking Pat if she is still a prostitute. Derek also tells her to tell David that he has not forgotten about their fight.

When Roxy asks Pat about Derek's past, Pat confirms that he is dangerous. Pat struggles to keep up the loan repayments on her house, and counts on Ricky's bonus money to cover the debt. When Ricky returns from Dubai, he reveals that he has lost all his money, so Pat explains that they will lose the house by the end of the week if a payment is not made. A desperate Pat turns to Janine and asks for money. Janine gives her £50,000 without hesitation, but insists on Pat using the house as collateral, although this does not thaw the animosity between the pair.

In the build-up to Christmas 2011, Pat gets acquainted with Jake and Danny's cousin Michael (Steve John Shepherd), who is conveniently also Janine's boyfriend. They find themselves sharing an enemy in Derek, as the latter begins to spark trouble in the square. When Michael spots Derek and Liam together, he forms an allegiance with Pat over their hatred of him and they proceed to call his probation officer to check up on him, infuriating Derek. He later confronts Pat, angrily threatening her.

Shortly after this, Patrick drops into Pat's and finds her collapsed on her kitchen floor. Pat is admitted to hospital, having suffered a pulmonary embolus, and the doctors run some tests, but she discharges herself secretly, telling Ricky she has been allowed to go. Janine then goes to see Pat, telling her she is moving the repayment deadline to the following day after an argument with Bianca. Pat rings Simon to find out whether he can pay her the money, but is left horrified when he tells her his brother David slept with his wife.

As her stress increases, Pat's chest pains continue, and Patrick persuades her to return to the hospital. There, she is diagnosed with pancreatic cancer, which has metastasised to her lungs, bones and abdomen. Pat refuses all further palliative treatment, and returns to Walford to be with her loved ones, sharing one last drink with her family and friends in The Queen Vic.

On New Year's Day 2012, Pat's health rapidly deteriorates, and she is visited by old friends, including her longtime friend Dot (June Brown), as well as Ian. Janine soon arrives to evict the family, after Pat is unable to pay all her debts back, but soon realises that Pat is not faking her illness and is devastated. Visiting her sick stepmother, Janine confesses to Pat that she is pregnant, and Pat convinces her to keep the baby, after which the two finally reconcile.

Later, David arrives to see Pat, but the pair argue; David leaves, and is persuaded to return by Carol. David tells Pat that he is sorry for the mess he has made of things over the years. David then tells Pat that he forgives her for all the times she let him down when he was a child. Despite admitting that she is scared, Pat is able to make peace with her son moments before she ultimately succumbs and dies. Everybody on the Square mourns for Pat the next day, and Norman comes back with a bunch of flowers for her, not knowing that she has already died. Pat's funeral, which is paid for by Janine, takes place, and is attended by many Albert Square residents. Simon turns up with flowers after the funeral has ended, and lays them down at her grave.

In May 2016, Peggy reappears in the square with terminal cancer that has spread to her brain. Peggy begins hallucinating the smell of cigarette smoke, which then manifests to a vision of Pat. As the two sit and reminisce about past memories, Peggy decides to commit suicide in order to prevent her family watching her deteriorate. Pat promises not to leave her side as she does this and watches sadly as Peggy commits suicide via an overdose.

Pat appears in episode 7246, broadcast on 23 December 2025, as part of Nigel Bates' (Paul Bradley) dementia storyline. Nigel hallucinates Pat sharing a drink with Barry in the Vic.

== In popular culture ==
The character of Pat has been spoofed in the cartoon sketch series 2DTV. The impressionist who provided the voice is Jan Ravens, who has not only provided the voice of Pat, but also acted the part on-screen in several episodes of the BBC's Big Impression, which devoted a regular sketch to various EastEnders characters. Ravens also played Pat in the other impressionist series, Dead Ringers. The Impressions Show with Culshaw and Stephenson contains sketches in which impressionist Debra Stephenson portrays Pat in situations, often with Coronation Street character Ken Barlow, played by Jon Culshaw.

In the first episode of Series 3 of The Inbetweeners, Jay gets his ears pierced with large round earrings and is mocked by his friend Simon Cooper, who calls it the "Pat Butcher look". The character Pat Butcher, portrayed by Jim Howick in the BBC sitcom Ghosts, is named for the EastEnders character.

== Reception ==
In 2020, Sara Wallis and Ian Hyland from The Daily Mirror placed Pat fifth on their ranked list of the best EastEnders characters of all time, calling Pat a "Former beauty queen and prostitute whose character was as bold and attention-grabbing as her ear rings" and noting that she was "involved in many memorable slanging matches with Peggy including the classic pair of "You bitch! You cow!" slapping altercations that took place ten years apart". In 2021, Angie Quinn from MyLondon called Pat one of the "icons who are no longer on the square" and noted how fans missed her. Joe Anderton of Digital Spy called Pat a "gay icon".
