= Willy (EastEnders) =

Fictional character

- EastEnders character
- Portrayed by: Willy
- Duration: 1985–1992
- First appearance: Episode 1 “Poor Old Reg” 19 February 1985
- Last appearance: Episode 759; 14 May 1992
- Species: Dog
- Breed: Pug
In-universe information
- Owners: Ethel Skinner; Mr Pavasars (1986)

Willy (also Rasputin) is a fictional dog from the BBC soap opera EastEnders. Willy is a Pug, who appears in the first episode of the programme on 19 February 1985 and remains in the show until 14 May 1992.

== Casting ==
Willy was cast less than a week before the filming of EastEnders began. From the beginning it was decided that the pensioner Ethel Skinner was to have a Yorkshire Terrier named Willy (after her late husband). The company Janimals, who specialised in providing and training animals for television and films, was contacted by EastEnders co-creator/producer Julia Smith, and informed her that they could provide an experienced Pug for the part (he had previously starred in Swallows and Amazons). The dog was brought to the studio to meet Gretchen Franklin, the actress who played Ethel. She liked him straight away and so the pug was cast as Willy. Roly the poodle and Willy shared a dressing room at Elstree Studios. In the original rehearsal script Willy was named Phillip.

== Storylines ==
Willy is Ethel Skinner's (Gretchen Franklin) constant companion. She rarely appears on-screen without him tucked under her arm. He was named after her late husband, William Skinner (Ian Brimble). There were various innuendo-laden references to the dog, with Ethel's famous lines being either "Where's my Willy?" or, in a double entendre, "Has anyone seen my little Willy?"

Willy can often be quite mischievous. When Ethel is preparing the food in The Queen Victoria public house one day, Willy and Roly eat all the expensive steak for the steak and kidney pies when her back is turned. Ethel replaces the meat with a less costly cut and everyone comments that the pies were not up to standard. At Christmas 1990, he sneaks into the Fowlers' and begins eating the turkey.

Willy runs away in 1986. While Ethel is distracted, Willy slips out the open door to the laundrette. He is eventually found by Detective Roy Quick (Douglas Fielding) in a pet shop, but when Quick returns with Ethel, Willy has been sold. Willy is tracked down to his new owner, Mr Pavasars (Sydney Arnold), who has renamed him Rasputin. Lou Beale (Anna Wing) fetches him back and returns Willy to his rightful owner. When Ethel falls and breaks her hip, Willy stays with Dot Cotton (June Brown), and they find each other a strain. Dot isn't the only one who can't tolerate Willy. First Ernie Mears (Ken Wynne) and then Benny Bloom (Arnold Yarrow) want to marry Ethel, but only if she will get rid of Willy. Ethel can't part with her beloved dog so she turns them both down.

When Ethel and her friends go on a holiday to Clacton, Willy has to go too, in a holdall. He is discovered by the owner of the bed and breakfast, but the owner is a dog-lover too and allows Willy to stay.

Willy is examined at the vets, where he is later put down (1992).

Willy is a touch sensitive, and when Dr. Harold Legg (Leonard Fenton) makes several remarks about "dog mess" in the Square, Ethel fears it upset him to the extent that he can't perform at all. Willy's constipation is later resolved.

After succumbing to old-age, Willy falls ill in 1992 and Ethel makes the heart-breaking decision to put him down. Ethel is devastated to lose her dog, so the residents of Albert Square raise money to buy her a new dog. However, Ethel declines to accept it, saying that Willy is irreplaceable.

On 30 May 1992, two weeks and two days after being written out of EastEnders, the dog who played Willy died.

== See also ==
- List of fictional dogs
