= Gary Olsen =

English actor (1957–2000)

- Born: Gary Kenneth Grant; 3 November 1957; Westminster, London, England
- Died: 12 September 2000 (aged 42); Melbourne, Victoria, Australia
- Occupation: Actor
- Years active: 1979–2000
- Spouses: Candy Davis (m. 1985; div. 1990) Jane Anthony (m. 1991)
- Children: 2

Gary Olsen (born Gary Kenneth Grant; 3 November 1957 – 12 September 2000) was an English actor. He played Ben Porter on the BBC television sitcom 2point4 Children from 1991 to 1999.

== Biography ==
Olsen was born in London and lived with an aunt and uncle after both his parents, Patricia and Kenny, died when he was young. He attended the Archbishop Tenison's Church of England School in Kennington. After school he joined various junior stage groups and toured with fringe theatrical companies, such as Incubus and Lumiere and Son, until late 1976. At this point he immersed himself in the punk rock scene as lead vocalist with the band Swank (alongside future members of the Lurkers, Chelsea, and Cuddly Toys) until returning to theatre in 1978. Later he helped develop the musical production Up on the Roof, in which he starred in 1987 at London's Donmar and Apollo theatres.

He made his screen debut in 1979 as Rory Storm in Birth of the Beatles, and appeared in numerous British films and television programmes. He played PC Dave Litten in the first series of The Bill, but achieved mainstream success only with the role of Ben in the sitcom 2point4 Children (1991–1999). He played a starring film role as Arthur Hoyle alongside Samantha Janus and Neil Morrissey in the rugby league comedy, Up 'n' Under. He appeared in many TV adverts, including a 1996 National Westminster Bank advertising campaign.

In addition to his screen appearances he made numerous stage appearances including The Rocky Horror Show and What the Butler Saw. He also played 'Pope Liberty III' in the Australian production of the musical Bad Boy Johnny and the Prophets of Doom.

Olsen appeared as Steve in The Comic Strip Presents... parody of The Fly, called The Yob. He also starred with Brian Bovell in the 1986 TV series Prospects about two young men in the Docklands trying to get ahead but usually failing.

== Television roles ==
Olsen appeared in two episodes of the 1981 BBC TV series The Day of the Triffids as a street gang leader who later became an armed paramilitary officer.

He played PC Dave Litten in 12 episodes of The Bill between 1984 and 1986 (as well as the 1983 pilot episode, Woodentop). Olsen also starred in the 1986 TV series Prospects alongside Brian Bovell who played Jez Littlewood in Gimme Gimme Gimme, about two friends living in the Docklands area trying their hand at anything to make a "few bob". In 1988, he appeared in the EastEnders spin-off CivvyStreet as Albert, the patriarch of the Beale family. His most prominent role was as Ben Porter in 2point4 Children (1991–1999). He also had leading roles in another two short-lived BBC sitcoms Health and Efficiency (1993–1995) and Pilgrim's Rest opposite Gwen Taylor for one series in 1997. From 1999–2000 he played Johno in the Daz Dogs adverts and sponsors.

== Stage roles ==
Olsen was critically acclaimed for a number of his roles in musicals including The Rocky Horror Show, Cut and Thrust, Gorky Brigade, Welcome Home, The Pope's Wedding, Saved Dialogues, Metamorphosis, Serious Money, What the Butler Saw, Way of the World, and Bad Boy Johnny and the Prophets of Doom. He received particular praise for his portrayal of Moey in On the Ledge at the National Theatre in 1993. Two years later he appeared in April in Paris at the same theatre. His last stage role was as Evan in Art by Yasmina Reza, in 2000.

== Personal life ==
Olsen married Candy Davis (later known as the crime writer Mo Hayder) in 1985; they later divorced. He married Australian Jane Anthony in 1991; the couple had two children. After a ten-month illness with cancer, Olsen died on 12 September 2000. in Victoria, Australia, where he had emigrated following his diagnosis. He was 42 years old.

== Selected filmography ==
=== Film ===
Year	Title	Role	Notes
1979	Birth of the Beatles	Rory Storm	Debut
1980	Bloody Kids	Ken's Gang 4	
1980	Breaking Glass	Guy at Bar	
1981	Outland	Worker 1	
1982	Pink Floyd—The Wall	Roadie	
1982	The Sender	Patient #9	
1983	Party Party	Terry, the drunk copper	
1984	Winter Flight	Dave	
1985	Turtle Diary	Lorry Driver at Rest Park	
1985	Underworld	Red Dog	
1985	Loose Connections	Kevin	
1987	Excuse Me But That's My Car	Nigel	Short
1989	Rapid Fire	Miles	
1989	The Cook, the Thief, His Wife & Her Lover	Spangler	
1997	Up 'n' Under	Arthur Hoye	
1999	The Comedy Trail: A Shaggy Dog Story	Ben Porter	TV special
2000	24 Hours in London	Christian	Final role

=== Television ===
Year	Title	Role	Notes
1980	Play for Today	Youth	Bavarian Night
1981	The Day of the Triffids	Torrence	2 episodes
1982	Minder	Derek	Episode: "Broken Arrow"
1983	Storyboard	P.C. Litten	Woodentop
1983	Walter and June	Shower Room Attendant	TV Movie
1984	Mitch	Despatch Rider	Episode: "Something Private"
1984–86	The Bill	P.C. Litten	12 episodes
1986	C.A.T.S Eyes	Colin	Episode: "Powerline"
1986	Prospects	Jimmy 'Pincy' Pince	12 episodes
1986	Wilderness Road	Keith	6 episodes
1987	Drummonds	Terry	Episode: "Old Flames"
1988	Bust	Nick Radford	Episode: "Weekend Break"
1988	Civvy Street	Arthur Beale	TV special
1988	The Comic Strip Presents	Terry	The Yob
1989	Boon	Geoff Robinson	Episode: "Do Not Forsake Me"
1989	Saracen	Deanie	Episode: "Robbers"
1989	Theatre Night	Chief Clerk	Metamorphisis
1990	Come Home Charlie and Face Them	Porsen	3 episodes
	She-Wolf of London	John Decarlo	Episode: "Can't Keep a Dead Man Down - Part 1"
1991	Casualty	Gary Tate	Episode: "Allegiance"
1991	Van Der Valk	Brouwer	Episode: "A Sudden Silence"
1991–99	2point4 Children	Ben Porter	56 episodes
1992	The Young Indiana Jones Chronicles	Boris	Episode: "Petrograd, July 1917"
1993	If You See God, Tell Him	Matthew	1 episode
1993	Paul Calf's Video Diary	Tony	TV special
1993	Thatcherworld	Eric Jenkins	TV Movie
1993–95	Health and Efficiency	Dr. Michael Jimson	12 episodes
1994	Pauline Calf's Wedding Diary	Tony	TV special
1995	The Vet	Wilf Morgan	Episode: "A Little Knowledge"
1997	Pilgrim's Rest	Bob Payne	6 episodes
1998	Alice Through the Looking Glass	Tweedle-Dum	TV Movie
1999	The Near and Complete History of Everything	Mr. Baker	TV special
