= CivvyStreet =

- EastEnders episode
- Title card
- Directed by: Julia Smith
- Written by: Tony Holland
- Editing by: Denis Wyatt
- Production code: LDLK992L
- Original air date: 26 December 1988
- Running time: 60 minutes

Episode chronology
← Previous "Episode 405"	Next → "Episode 406"

"CivvyStreet" (sometimes written as "Civvy Street") is a spin-off episode of the British television soap opera EastEnders, broadcast on BBC1 on 26 December 1988. The episode is a flashback to World War II and is set at Christmas 1942. The episode was watched by 7 million viewers.

== Plot ==
Lou Beale (Karen Meagher) and her husband Albert Beale (Gary Olsen) are celebrating their marriage in Walford, and planning their happy life together when war is declared. Albert is conscripted into the army, leaving Lou and her three children, Kenny Beale, Harry Beale (Aaron Mason) and Ronnie Beale (Chase Marks), behind. Lou's family rally around including her mother (played by Avis Bunnage) and sister Flo (Linda Robson) and her friends including young Ethel (Alison Bettles), dodgy Reg Cox (Marc Tufano) and pub landlords Ray (Robert Putt) and Lil (Frances Cuka) to keep her company. Lou worries that Albert will not return from war intact, and the episode sees her propositioned by Richard (Otto Jarman) in his absence, but she stays faithful and she and Albert are reunited. Ethel's parents are killed by an enemy bomb while she is sheltering with Lou in Walford East tube station. Ethel is also torn between the amorous advances of a GI and her admirer William Skinner (Ian Brimble).

== Cast and characters ==
- Gary Olsen as Albert Beale
- Karen Meagher as Lou Beale
- Avis Bunnage as Lou's mum
- Linda Robson as Flo
- Aaron Mason as Harry Beale
- Chase Marks as Ronnie Beale
- Alison Bettles as Ethel Skinner
- Ian Brimble as William Skinner
- Otto Jarman as Richard
- Julian Wild as Marty
- Robert Putt as Ray Sewell
- Frances Cuka as Lil Sewell

== Production ==
The episode was written by Tony Holland and directed by Julia Smith, who were the creators of EastEnders. Due to EastEnders' high ratings at the time, the producers were asked to make a special Christmas episode. They decided to use the history that had been established for the Beale family and tell a wartime story featuring some of the show's characters. Historical facts were "bent a little", with some events of the period happening in the wrong order, to aid the storyline. "CivvyStreet" was filmed at BBC Elstree Centre, the shooting location for EastEnders. The set was transformed into a 1940s version of Albert Square.

Described as "nostalgic" by the BBC, it looks at the early life of the residents of Albert Square and features a young Lou Beale, Ethel Skinner and Reg Cox, who was a minor character found dead in the first episode of EastEnders in 1985. It is a flashback to World War II, set in Christmas 1942. Holland was disappointed to discover that the character of Dot Cotton would have been too young during the war to be featured as a useful character (she would have been six years old in 1942) and he thought that the major events of the war happened in the wrong order for effective drama. However, Dot featured in her own special episode in 2003, called "Dot's Story", which shows her being evacuated to the countryside during World War II.

Actress Karen Meagher was cast as a young Lou Beale, who struggles to raise her children, after her husband Albert (played by Gary Olsen) is called up. Meagher researched her role by talking to her parents about their wartime experiences.

Alison Bettles plays Lou's "flirty" friend Ethel, who an Inside Soap writer said was "true to the latter-day version" portrayed by Gretchen Franklin. Ethel reads tea leaves and sings to keep up the spirits of those in the air raid shelters. Meanwhile, Reg Cox is seen trading on the black market, and Lou's children and her sister Flo (Linda Robson) also feature. Olsen commented in 1996 on the legacy of the episode in EastEnders, joking that he regularly appears in the show: "I did a special which was set in the war, called Civvy Street, and I played Albert Beale. In it I married Lou. Our wedding photo can be seen on the Fowlers' sideboard. I don't get a penny for it."

According to the Musicians' Union in September 2017, they received royalties for the theme music used in "CivvyStreet" but could not distribute them as the performers were not known to them. As of May 2018 the performers have been located.

== Reception ==
Official ratings from the Broadcasters' Audience Research Board showed that the episode gained 7 million viewers and achieved 74th place in the British Top 100 programmes for that week. Whilst this spin-off episode did not achieve similar viewership to two episodes of EastEnders that week (19.1 million and 21.1 million), it did gain a higher viewership compared to other popular programmes that week, such as Yes Prime Minister (6.5 million), French and Saunders (6.4 million) and Brookside (6.2 million).

In 1999, Steve Pratt of the Northern Echo said of the episode: "EastEnders went back to Albert Square during the Blitz in a programme called Civvy Street. Young actors took over familiar characters, such as Lou Beale and Ethel, in their younger days during the Second World War. The Queen Vic was just a spit-and-sawdust local, with Ray Sewell and his wife Lil behind the bar. The idea was not a success."

In 2017, Michael Hogan from The Daily Telegraph called "CivvyStreet" an "over-ambitious wartime flashback". Tom Eames from Digital Spy named it one of the "TV origin stories you've probably forgotten even existed".

== Release ==
In December 2016, "CivvyStreet" was released on BBC Store part of the "EastEnders Christmas Classics 2" set but also available individually, and was available until the BBC Store closed on 1 November 2017.

== See also ==
- List of EastEnders television spin-offs
