= Ciaran Madden =

British actress (born 1942)

Ciaran Anne Magdalene Madden (born 27 December 1942) is a retired English stage, film, and television actress, who was professionally active from the late 1960s through the late 1990s.

She is a graduate of the Royal Academy of Dramatic Arts (RADA), and is an Associate Member of the academy.

Madden is best known internationally for her multiple leading Agatha Christie, Shakespeare, and Tom Stoppard roles filmed for television, and for her dramatic performance as Marianne Dashwood in the 1971 BBC miniseries adaptation of Jane Austen's Sense and Sensibility. She appeared in more than 30 television series, teleplays, made-for-television movies, and television miniseries, including a starring performance in the miniseries A Married Man (1984) opposite Anthony Hopkins. She also had major roles in five feature films, including Gawain and the Green Knight (1973), the cult horror film The Beast Must Die (1974), Spy Story (1976) and Swing Kids (1993).

She had originally trained at the Ruskin School of Art at the University of Oxford prior to enrolling at RADA. In the late 1990s she gave up acting and returned to painting, focusing on portraits, and received a diploma from the Heatherley School of Fine Art in London.

== Personal life ==
In 2001 she moved to Dorset with her second husband, Christian Tyler, whom she had married in 1987. Her previous husband, whom she had married in 1972, was John Patrick Scrivenor; they had a son born in late 1972.

== Filmography ==
=== Film ===
Year	Title	Role	Notes
1969	Wolfshead: The Legend of Robin Hood	Lady Marian Fitzwalter	
1973	Gawain and the Green Knight	Linet	
1974	The Beast Must Die	Davina	
1976	Spy Story	Marjorie	
1993	Swing Kids	Frau Berger	

=== Television ===
Year	Title	Role	Notes
1969	W. Somerset Maugham	Isabel Longstaffe	"The Fall of Edward Barnard"
1969	Play of the Month	Adrienne	"The Marquise"
1970	The Hero of My Life	Mary Hogarth	TV film
1970	ITV Sunday Night Theatre	Ophelia	"Hamlet"
1971	Sense and Sensibility	Marianne Dashwood	TV miniseries
1974	Bedtime Stories	Clare Rawley	"Sleeping Beauty"
1974	Jennie: Lady Randolph Churchill	Gwendoline Churchill	"His Borrowed Plumes", "A Past and a Future"
1976	Star Maidens	Fidelia	"The End of Time"
1976	BBC Play of the Month	Alison Porter	"Look Back in Anger"
1977	BBC Play of the Month	Alithea	"The Country Wife"
1977	Jubilee	Karen Seyric	"An Hour in the Life..."
1978	Do You Remember?	Ellen	"Park People"
1978	Return of the Saint	Janie Lennox	"Signal Stop"
1978	Much Ado About Nothing	Hero	TV film
1979	My Son, My Son	Livia Vaynol	TV miniseries
1979	ITV Playhouse	Tina Styles	"Print Out"
1980	Call My Bluff	Herself	Guest contestant, 27/1
1981	A Spy at Evening	Jazz	TV miniseries
1982	The Agatha Christie Hour	Theo Darrell	"Magnolia Blossom"
1983	On the Razzle	Madame Knorr	TV film
1983	A Married Man	Claire Strickland	TV miniseries
1984	Oxbridge Blues	Rachel / Laura	"Similar Triangles", "Cheap Day"
1984	Agatha Christie's Miss Marple: The Body in the Library	Adelaide Jefferson	TV film
1985–1987	Drummonds	Mary Drummond	Main role
1987	Fortunes of War	Angela Hooper	TV miniseries
1989	The Dog It Was That Died	Pamela	TV film
1989	Agatha Christie's Poirot	Lady Mayfield	"The Incredible Theft"
1989	The Play on One	Catherine	"These Foolish Things"
1990	TECX	Angela Kortenbach	"Rock a Buy Baby"
1990	Boon	Margery Keeverton	"Thicker Than Water"
1991	Van der Valk	Melanie van Hoorn	"A Sudden Silence"
1991	Casualty	Zoe Turner	"Humpty Dumpty", "Judgement Day"
1992	Maigret	Mme. Maigret	Regular role (season 1)
1992	Between the Lines	Sandra Urquhart	"Nobody's Fireproof", "The Chill Factor"
1997	Ivanhoe	Urfried	TV miniseries
