= Ethel Skinner =

Fictional character from EastEnders

- EastEnders character
- Gretchen Franklin as Ethel Skinner (1985)
- Portrayed by: Gretchen Franklin; Alison Bettles (flashback)
- Duration: 1985–1997, 2000
- First appearance: Episode 1 Poor Old Reg"; 19 February 1985
- Last appearance: Episode 1999; 7 September 2000
- Created by: Julia Smith and Tony Holland
- Introduced by: Julia Smith (1985); Leonard Lewis (1993); Barbara Emile (1994); Jane Harris (1997); John Yorke (2000)
- Book appearances: The Flower of Albert Square
- Spin-off appearances: "CivvyStreet" (1988)
- Alison Bettles as Ethel Skinner in CivvyStreet
In-universe information
- Occupation: Cleaner; Fortune teller
- Brothers: Howard Lewis
- Sisters: Trish Lewis
- Husband: William Skinner (backstory)

Ethel Skinner is a fictional character from the BBC soap opera EastEnders, played by Gretchen Franklin. Ethel also features in a 1988 EastEnders special episode, entitled "CivvyStreet", set on Albert Square during World War II, in which she is played by Alison Bettles.

Ethel is an EastEnders original character and in the early years she can always be found wandering the neighbourhood with her adored pug Willy. She and Dot Cotton (June Brown) are lifelong friends, and although they wind each other up, they are completely dependent on each other. Ethel trusts Dot so much that she even asks her to help her die in 2000 after she is diagnosed with terminal cancer.

== Creation and development ==
Ethel Skinner was the second out of the original twenty-three characters invented by the creators of EastEnders, Tony Holland and Julia Smith (the first to be created was Lou Beale). Ethel was based on an elderly woman that Smith had encountered in a pub in Hackney. She had bright ginger hair, a face plied with make-up, she laughed a lot and was obviously "the life and soul of the party". She also had a little dog, Willy, who she dressed in a red ribbon, tied in a neat bow on its head. Smith felt that a character like this would be an excellent inclusion to the show. Ethel's original character outline as written by Smith and Holland appeared in an abridged form in their book, EastEnders: The Inside Story.

"Most of her money goes on food for her dog, Willy, a Yorkie, and booze for herself. She has a hopeless memory for actual facts but can tell endless stories about pre-war London, her childhood, and, above all, the war. She does miss the friendliness of the old East-end... She has false teeth and red hair: those are the two things you most notice about her - then the dog... Her greatest joy is telling fortunes, cards, tea-cups and palm-reading. "I've got the gift she says... Born in 1920, in Camden Town... left home, aged 16, to work for a posh Hackney family, as a general undermaid... Ethel came home one day to find her street destroyed by a doodlebug. Her parents had been in the house... Ethel met William, a docker, and they married when Ethel was 25... Ethel and William had no children... As a youngster, Ethel would have been a page three girl, a real pin-up." (page 52)

Gretchen Franklin was the first actress that Smith and Holland had in mind for the role. An experienced actress with a long career in show-business, Franklin was considered to be ideal casting, so she was offered the part.

Ethel became a popular and well-loved character from very early on in the series. Ethel was a gossip who did not always get her facts right, and this was often used for comic effect, as was her use of malapropisms. She became famous for owning a pug named Willy. Ethel's famous lines being either, "Where's my Willy?" or, in a double entendre, "Has anyone seen my little Willy". It was originally intended for Ethel's dog to be a Yorkshire Terrier, but as no suitable Yorkie could be found, a pug was used instead. Over the seven years they worked together Willy (the actor) and Franklin became very attached to each other. So much so that Franklin even tried to buy Willy at one stage, commenting: "I tried to buy him from the BBC but he's too valuable now, he earns a bomb in personal appearances." Franklin was heart-broken in 1992 when the producers made the decision to retire Willy. On-screen Willy became ill and had to be put down. However just over two weeks after his last appearance on the programme the dog who played Willy died. Franklin has commented: "A woman stopped me in the street and said: 'It was like him committing suicide. When he knew he wasn't wanted on that programme no more, he just turned over and died.'"

Ethel's friendship with Dot Cotton (June Brown) was another enduring relationship that lasted throughout the characters time in the show and today they are remembered fondly by fans as being an incomparable double-act. Their arguing and obvious differences were often used for comic effect in many scenes. However, in episode 248 of the show the audience were shown a different side to Ethel and Dot's friendship in the soaps second two-hander episode. The episode was aired in July 1987 and featured just the two old ladies (although Dot was Ethel's junior by twenty years or so), and was scripted as a mini-play about nostalgia and growing old. Some viewers found it too unusual, but many others were charmed by the change of pace. The episode gave Franklin and June Brown the opportunity to show the sadness behind the often comical characters of Ethel and Dot. The episode was written by Charlie Humphreys and directed by Mike Gibbon, a future producer of the show.

The character of Ethel initially remained on the show for twelve years, although her appearances towards the end became more widely spaced and she only returned to the show intermittently. Off-screen Gretchen Franklin retired, however three years after her last brief appearance Ethel was reintroduced to the show for one final and highly controversial storyline. The storyline involved her old friend Dot helping her to commit suicide. When Ethel Skinner became ill in September 2000, she asked Dot to help her when the time finally came for her to die. Dot had to make a decision that went against her moral and religious beliefs. In the end Dot decided that friendship was more important and so she helped Ethel die peacefully. Written by Simon Ashdown and directed by Francesca Joseph, the episode ended with a touching scene in which Ethel tells a weeping Dot "you're the best friend I ever had". The finishing touch was the use of an alternative end title music, replacing the dramatic drum beats with a war time orchestral piece. The ramifications of this storyline were immense for the character of Dot, and the consequences of her actions were examined in detail - which included a crisis of faith. Such was the controversy surrounding this storyline that the University of Glamorgan uses the plot as part of their new approach to the study of British criminal law. Part of the law foundation course involves studying the soap opera and giving students the chance to decide if Dot Cotton's character is guilty of murder.

Ethel's euthanasia is considered to be one of the most moving storylines ever featured in EastEnders and it was voted the most emotional soap death in a Radio Times poll of over 4,000 readers." 16.2 million viewers tuned in to see Ethel's final appearance in the show and 15 million viewers watched her funeral.

== Age ==
Ethel's original character outline states that she was born in 1920. However, during the series this was altered to 1916 and for many years her birthday fell on 19 February. When Ethel came back to Walford to die in 2000, she revealed to Dot that she had lied about her age for many years. She was actually 86, not 85 (the character was aged two years, in a dramatic technique known as SORAS, making her birthday fall in 1914). Ethel died on what she claimed was the night of her 86th birthday in September 2000 and although Dot knew very well her birthday was in February, she organised a party at Ethel's request to give her one last "birthday" before she died. 19 February is also the day in 1985 that EastEnders was first broadcast.

In January 2003, when Jamie Mitchell's funeral took place, Sonia Jackson lays flowers at Ethel's gravestone. The inscription can be seen to read Ethel May Skinner, Born 19.2.1919, Died 7.9.2000, making her 81 at the time of her death.

== Storylines ==
=== Backstory ===
Ethel Skinner is one of the original characters that appears in the first episode of EastEnders in 1985 and her early history is depicted in the 1986 authorised novel The Flower of Albert Square, which directly contradicts the later EastEnders flashback episode, "CivvyStreet". In the novel, Ethel grows up with her family in Beckton, which is bombed during the war, killing her parents and leading her to live with her uncle and aunt in Hackney. She later meets William (Ian Brimble) and moves to Albert Square after the war, after he proposes. However, in the television episode, Ethel is said to have lived in Albert Square for most of her life, remaining there through the war and witnessing the death of her entire family, who are killed by a doodlebug. This tragic event sends a young Ethel into shock and subsequently she develops eccentric behaviour. She begins dressing outrageously, wearing garish make-up, flirting with anyone in trousers, and knocking back gin, traits that last well into her old age. In a 1986 episode of EastEnders, Ethel says she had an argument with her father during the war and left home, saying she would never return as long as he was there; she returned the next day and both her parents had been killed by a doodlebug.

Ethel never recovers from William's death and names her pug dog after him, Willy. Ethel has surviving extended family, including her husband's nephew Eddie Skinner, who appeared at her funeral, staying in Walford for a few months afterwards. Eddie also has a daughter called Kerry Skinner.

=== 1985–1997 ===
Ethel had never had children, a fact that she regretted in her old age, and so Willy became her surrogate child, and she loves him dearly. Willy goes everywhere that Ethel goes and so she is devastated when he is kidnapped in 1986. She searches for him everywhere and even holds a seance to see if she can contact him, but Willy is nowhere to be found. Roy Quick (Douglas Fielding) works on the case and eventually finds Willy in the possession of Mr Pavasars (Sydney Arnold), an old Latvian refugee, who has renamed him Rasputin. Willy is returned to an overjoyed Ethel, although she has to pay the man in order to get him to relinquish ownership. Ethel has been a lifelong friend of Lou Beale (Anna Wing) and Dot Cotton (June Brown) and the trio remain close in their old age. They can often be found reminiscing or gossiping in The Queen Victoria pub, where Ethel also regularly thrills the punters with her repartee, her version of the cancan, or her plain sense of fun. Out of the three, Ethel is the most light-hearted and she is never frightened to stand up to the overbearing Lou and interfering Dot. She has her run-ins with both over the years, and yet their friendship endures right to the last.

Ethel lives above Doctor Legg's (Leonard Fenton) surgery and works as the cleaner in the pub. She is somewhat of a troublemaker and often spreads the most insane rumours about and gets her words mixed up with hilarious consequences. She is famous for her questionable ability to read palms and tea leaves, once even earning a living from it. After Lou's death in 1988 Ethel and Dot become an inseparable double-act and although the two argue constantly, they actually depend on each other a great deal. Despite the fact that Ethel appears totally barmy, she can be quite astute when she wants and she is always the first to point out the malicious ways of Dot's villainous son, Nick Cotton (John Altman). Ethel is never afraid to stand up to Nick, even kneeing him in the groin once when he attempts to mug her. She also correctly figures out that Nick is trying to poison Dot to get her money, and she refuses to back down, despite Dot falling out with her because of her accusations. Following several falls and a broken hip, Ethel is persuaded to move out of her residence above the surgery and into sheltered housing in 1988. Although she is strongly opposed to this initially, she eventually comes to enjoy her new home, though she would continue to show up in Albert Square regularly.

Ethel has several romances with senior bachelors on Albert Square. Her ex-boyfriend from the war years, Ernie Mears (Ken Wynne), returns to Albert Square in 1985 and proposes to her. However, the offer is conditional. Ernie is allergic to dogs and Willy, Ethel's constant companion for the past nine years, would have to go. Ethel seriously considers Ernie's offer but gently declines. In 1988 she finds romance again with a friend of Dr. Legg's, Benny Bloom (Arnold Yarrow). Dot loathes Benny and does everything she can to talk Ethel out of dating him. Ethel and Benny discuss marriage, which Ethel agrees to, mainly to spite Dot, who calls her a "silly fool" for wanting to remarry at her age. However, after discovering pets are not allowed in the manor where Benny lives, the engagement was called off, once again because of Willy. A few months later Ethel hears news that Benny has died and has left her £2,000, although his daughter tries to contest the will for a while.

In August 1989, Ethel meets a new love interest named Reggie Thompson (John Rutland). He invites her to go on a coach trip to Clacton for a dancing competition. Ethel is so excited that she shows Reggie a saucy nightie she has bought for the trip. When Dot, Marge Green (Pat Coombs) and Mo Butcher (Edna Doré) find out about the trip, they decide to go as well. Reggie arranges dancing partners for them and the ladies practise hard at the community centre for months before the trip. But upon arriving on holiday, Ethel grows disappointed in Reggie when he starts to show interest in another woman named Gladys. On the night of the dancing competition, Ethel finds that Reggie has run off with Gladys and she has no partner in the grand ballroom except for her "little Willy". In 1992, Ethel's adored pug Willy succumbs to old age and she has to make the heartbreaking decision to put him down. Regulars at The Queen Victoria pub raise money to buy Ethel a new dog, but she refuses to accept it, saying Willy is irreplaceable. By the mid-1990s Ethel is seen much less frequently. She is seen occasionally however, usually when a big event is occurring or to celebrate Christmas and New Year with her old friends on the Square. After 1997 Ethel is not seen in Walford for three years, although she is mentioned often, particularly by Dot, who will often visit her off-screen in her sheltered housing.

=== 2000 ===
In June 2000, a somewhat frailer Ethel resumes her visits to Albert Square, usually arriving at Pauline Fowler's (Wendy Richard) house. Despite being restricted to a wheelchair, Ethel remains cheerful, bickering with Dot and teasing Pauline about her relationship with Jeff Healy (Leslie Schofield). She stays with Pauline for a brief while in July to get over the death of a friend at the retirement home, at which time Dot becomes Ethel's primary caregiver, a task which often leaves Dot exhausted.

After a couple of weeks, Ethel shocks Dot by revealing that she is suffering from terminal cancer and is not going to live much longer, and that she has come home to the square to die, but instead of waiting to die in agony, she wants to choose her final moments so she can die with dignity.

Ethel has been storing her morphine tablets for many weeks and it is her plan to take an overdose before the pain becomes too unbearable. However, before being able to execute her plan, she becomes too weak and is unable to administer the drugs without Dot's assistance. Dot is devastated and initially refuses to help Ethel, as to help another take their own life goes completely against her strict Christian principles. Dot spends many agonising weeks wrestling with her conscience, but she eventually agrees to grant her old friend's final wish. On the night of her 85th birthday (it was actually her 86th, but she had always lied about her age), after a celebratory party at The Vic, Ethel decides that this was to be her last night. After blowing out the candles of her birthday cake and bidding Dot an emotional farewell, Ethel takes the pills, aided by Dot, and dies peacefully in her sleep. When Dot herself dies 22 years later, she is buried next to Ethel, reuniting the pair for eternity.

== Reception ==
Ethel's death was voted the fourth most emotional moment in television entertainment in a 2010 poll of 3,000 British people conducted by Freeview HD. An All About Soap writer included Ethel's euthanasia plot in their list of "top ten taboos" storyline list. They assessed that it was one of the "taboos which have bravely been broken by soaps."
