= Sense and Sensibility (1971 TV series) =

1971 British television drama series

- DVD cover: Ciaran Madden & Clive Francis
- Written by: Denis Constanduros
- Directed by: David Giles
- Starring: Joanna David; Ciaran Madden; Patricia Routledge
- Country of origin: United Kingdom
- No. of series: 1
- No. of episodes: 4

Production
- Producer: Martin Lisemore
- Running time: 45 minutes (per episode)

Original release
- Network: BBC Two
- Release: 9 January – 30 January 1971

Sense and Sensibility is a 1971 BBC television adaptation of Jane Austen's 1811 novel. It was dramatised by Denis Constanduros, and directed by David Giles.

== Cast ==
- Michael Aldridge – Sir John Middleton (4 episodes)
- Sheila Ballantine – Lady Middleton (4 episodes)
- Esme Church – Mary (4 episodes)
- Joanna David – Elinor Dashwood (4 episodes)
- Isabel Dean – Mrs. Dashwood (4 episodes)
- Robin Ellis – Edward Ferrars (4 episodes)
- Clive Francis – John Willoughby (4 episodes)
- Ciaran Madden – Marianne Dashwood (4 episodes)
- Richard Owens – Colonel Brandon (4 episodes)
- Patricia Routledge – Mrs. Jennings (4 episodes)
- Jo Kendall – Charlotte Palmer (3 episodes)
- Peter Laird – Rodgers (3 episodes)
- David Strong – Palmer (3 episodes)
- David Belcher – Robert Ferrars (2 episodes)
- Frances Cuka – Lucy Steele (2 episodes)
- Mischa De La Motte – Master of Ceremonies (2 episodes)
- Kay Gallie – Fanny Dashwood (2 episodes)
- Milton Johns – John Dashwood (2 episodes)
- Maggie Jones – Nancy Steele (2 episode)
- Clifford Parrish – Doctor Harris (2 episodes)
- Ailsa Grahame – Mrs. Ferrars (1 episode)
