= Pilgrim's Rest (TV series) =

British sitcom

Pilgrim's Rest is a short-lived British sitcom which aired for just one series of 6 episodes on BBC1 from 31 July – 4 September 1997.

Gary Olsen of 2point4 Children fame starred as Bob Payne. Recently divorced, he sets up a roadside café named Pilgrim's Rest with his sister Tilly played by Gwen Taylor who is also divorced from Duncan played by John Duttine. The series follows Bob and Tilly along with their staff and several customers.

The series received average ratings and was cancelled after one series.

It was produced by Tiger Aspect.

== Episodes ==
Each episode lasted for 30 minutes.

- 1. Pilot – 31 July 1997
- 2. Mo News Is Bad News – 7 August 1997
- 3. It's Good To Talk – 14 August 1997
- 4. Bill's Writing – 21 August 1997
- 5. Rock of Ages – 28 August 1997
- 6. Odd Against – 4 September 1997

== Cast ==
- Gary Olsen as Bob
- Gwen Taylor as Tilly
- Jonathan Aris as Quentin
- John Arthur as Drew
- Jay Simpson as Ronnie
- Nina Young as Pamela
