= Avis Bunnage =

English actress (1923–1990)

- Bunnage as Doris in The L-Shaped Room (1962)
- Born: Mildred Avis Bunnage; 22 April 1923; Ardwick, Manchester, England
- Died: 4 October 1990 (aged 67); Thorpe Bay, Southend-on-Sea, England
- Occupation: Actress
- Years active: 1947–1990
- Spouse: Derek Orchard

Mildred Avis Bunnage (22 April 1923 – 4 October 1990) was an English actress of film, stage and television.

== Early life ==
Bunnage was born in Ardwick, Manchester. She attended Manley Park Municipal School and Chorlton Central School in Manchester. She worked as a secretary and a nursery teacher before deciding to become an actress.

== Career ==
Bunnage gained stage experience in rep and made her first professional appearance at Chorlton Rep Theatre in Manchester in 1947. Her television appearances include one episode of The Frighteners, ("The Disappearing Man" in 1972), with Victor Maddern; Rising Damp, as Rupert Rigsby's (Leonard Rossiter)'s estranged wife, Veronica; one episode of Wodehouse Playhouse, (1978); and as Amy Jenkinson, Ivy Unsworth's friend, in 11 episodes of In Loving Memory. Bunnage was a member of Joan Littlewood's Theatre Workshop company at the Theatre Royal Stratford East. There she created the role of Helen, the mother in A Taste of Honey, her first West End role when the play transferred to Wyndham's Theatre, and a role in Oh, What a Lovely War! at Stratford East, which also transferred to Wyndham's Theatre.

When Bunnage was on holiday from this production for two weeks, her role was taken over by Danny La Rue. Among her other roles for the Theatre Workshop were Mrs. Lovett in Christopher Bond's play Sweeney Todd (the basis for the Sondheim musical), and the title role in a play about the music hall performed Marie Lloyd. In the early years of Coronation Street, she played Lucille Hewitt's aunt. Bunnage was in the musical Billy at the Theatre Royal, Drury Lane, playing the mother of Billy Liar. She played Golda in Fiddler on the Roof, opposite Alfie Bass, at Her Majesty's Theatre in London.

Among Bunnage's various film roles were several British New Wave productions, such as Saturday Night and Sunday Morning and The Loneliness of the Long Distance Runner.

== Personal life ==
Married to Derek Orchard, she died on 4 October 1990 in Thorpe Bay, Southend-on-Sea, Essex, aged 67.

== Filmography ==
Year	Title	Role	Notes
1959	Expresso Bongo	Mrs. Rudge	Uncredited
1960	Doctor in Love	Mrs. Jimp	Uncredited
1960	Saturday Night and Sunday Morning	Blousy Woman	
1961	No Love for Johnnie	Constituent	Uncredited
1962	The Loneliness of the Long Distance Runner	Mrs. Smith	
1962	The L-Shaped Room	Doris	
1963	Sparrows Can't Sing	Bridgie	
1963	What a Crazy World	Mary Hitchens	
1963	Tom Jones	Landlady. George Inn	
	The Human Jungle		
1965	Rotten to the Core	Countess de Wett (Matron)	
1965	A Study in Terror	Landlady	
1966	The Wrong Box	Queen Victoria	
1967	The Whisperers	Mrs. Noonan	
1968	Mrs. Brown, You've Got a Lovely Daughter	Tulip's Mother	
1972	The Frighteners	Violet, Arthur's wife	(ITV (TV network) episode with Victor Maddern, 4 August.
1977	The Fosters	Mrs Pugh	Series 2, Episode 13 "The House Guest"
1978	Panic	Old Lady	Short
1979	Leave it to Charlie	Mrs. Foster	Episode: "Do Sit Down, Mrs. Foster"
1982	Gandhi	Colin's Mother	
1984	Forbidden	Frau Schimdt	
1985	No Surrender	Martha Gorman	
1988	CivvyStreet	Lou's mother	
1990	The Krays	Helen	(Final film role)
