= Gretchen Franklin =

English actress (1911–2005)

- Franklin as Ethel Skinner in EastEnders
- Born: Gretchen Gordon Franklin; 7 July 1911; Covent Garden, London, England
- Died: 11 July 2005 (aged 94); Barnes, London, England
- Occupations: Actress; dancer
- Years active: 1929–2000
- Known for: EastEnders
- Spouse: John Caswell Garth (m. 1934; died 1953)
- Relatives: Clive Dunn (cousin)

Gretchen Gordon Franklin (7 July 1911 – 11 July 2005) was an English actress and dancer with a career in show business spanning over 70 years. She played Ethel Skinner in the long-running BBC1 soap opera EastEnders on a regular basis from 1985 until 1988. Following this, she made intermittent returns to the show, her appearances becoming increasingly infrequent and brief. Her final appearance was in 2000, marking the demise of her character.

== Early life ==
Gretchen Gordon Franklin was born on 7 July 1911 in Covent Garden, Central London, into a theatrical family. She was the only child of her parents Gordon and Violet Franklin. Her father had a song-and-dance act, while her grandfather was a well-known music-hall entertainer at the turn of the 20th century. Her younger cousin was the comedian Clive Dunn (1920–2012).

Franklin entered show business as a teenager, making her début as a pantomime chorus girl in Bournemouth. In 1929, she took dancing lessons at the Theatre Girls Club in Soho in London's West End and she later became a tap dancer and founder member of a quartet known as Four Brilliant Blondes. Franklin was a Tiller Girl, known for their high kicks, at the London Palladium.

Franklin toured in variety with the comedians Syd and Max Harrison and on the Gracie Fields Show, and performed with another dance group, The Three Girlies, before making a gradual switch to straight dramatic roles.

== Acting career ==
Franklin's break came during the Second World War when she was cast in Sweet and Low, the first of a series of highly successful West End revues. Staged at the New Ambassadors Theatre, the revues starred Hermione Gingold. Franklin and Gingold became close friends and were reunited in another revue, Slings & Arrows (Comedy Theatre, 1948).

Franklin also appeared in several plays and made one of her early screen appearances in Before I Wake (1955). Her other films included Cloak Without Dagger (1956), Flame in the Streets (1961), Ticket to Paradise (1961 film), The Murder Game (1965), Twisted Nerve (1968), The Night Visitor (1971), The Three Musketeers (1973), Quincy's Quest (1979), and Ragtime (1981), among others.

Franklin appeared in several productions for the BBC and on stage. One of Franklin's best known stage roles was playing Mrs Roper in the 1958 play Verdict by British mystery writer Agatha Christie. It was produced by Peter Saunders and directed by Charles Hickman, and ran for 250 performances.

Franklin was acting on stage in the West End in Spring and Port Wine in 1965 when she was cast as the first Mrs Alf Garnett in a pilot episode of Till Death Us Do Part, with Warren Mitchell. However, she missed the chance to become a permanent part in what was to become a successful series – because she couldn't obtain her release from her stage role (unable to take a regular role in the series, it was Franklin who recommended her friend Dandy Nichols for the part in the series). Franklin and Nichols have cameo parts in two films directed by Richard Lester, the Beatles film Help! (1965) and How I Won the War (1967) which stars John Lennon.

Franklin later had regular roles in several television series, including Crossroads, in which she played Myrtle Cavendish (later Harvey); the short-lived soap Castle Haven; the sitcom George and Mildred as Mildred's mother, Mrs Tremble, and Rising Damp as Rigsby's Aunt Maud. She was also a regular supporting figure on television dramas such as Dixon of Dock Green and Z-Cars. She appeared with Eartha Kitt in an episode of the British espionage series The Protectors ("A Pocket Full of Posies", 1974) performing a song and dance routine. She had bit parts in series such as Danger Man, Follyfoot and the final Quatermass serial in 1979.

Franklin also played the troubled mother Mrs Janes in an episode of the television adaptation of Enid Blyton's Famous Five ("Five on Billycock Hill", 1978) and played the witch Cordelia at the end of the first episode of The Black Adder ("The Foretelling", 1983) starring Rowan Atkinson.

Franklin appeared in an early episode of Keeping Up Appearances broadcast in 1990.

=== EastEnders ===
EastEnders creators Julia Smith and Tony Holland spent a long time trawling around pubs and street markets in the East End of London, soaking up the atmosphere and making mental notes for when they were to actually create the characters for their show. Smith was very taken with an elderly lady clutching a Yorkshire Terrier dog in one hand and a glass of Guinness in the other, who was clearly the life and soul of the party; Smith saw that there was much comic mileage to be gained from such a character, and as a result Ethel May Skinner was created. In the programme, Ethel was a gossip who did not always get her facts right and this was often used to comic effect, as was her use of malapropisms. However, when Julia Smith announced that the character of Ethel was to go into an old people's home, Franklin resigned, saying "I didn't want Ethel becoming a sad old dear who the others visited occasionally." She did make return visits to the series, but remained bitter at how her character had been sidelined.

Ethel owned a dog, a pug named Willy. The writers had intended it to be a Yorkshire terrier but a suitable canine could not be found. Franklin was less than pleased to find out that Willy the pug was being chauffeur-driven to the BBC's Elstree Studios where EastEnders is made, yet she had to travel by bus. Returning to her earlier skills as a Tiller Girl, when Pat Wicks (Pam St Clement) married Frank Butcher (Mike Reid), Franklin provided the high-kicks at the wedding reception – even though she was 78 at the time.

Franklin's character departed in 1997 when it was revealed that she had left Walford to live in a retirement village. Franklin returned in July 2000, when her character re-appeared in the show and informed her close friends that she was terminally ill with cancer. She was killed off in the episode which aired on 7 September 2000, in a controversial euthanasia storyline. Ethel had learned that she was terminally ill, and asked Dot Cotton (June Brown) to assist her in taking her own life by an overdose of her morphine tablets.

Franklin's departure from EastEnders marked the end of her acting career at the age of 89.

== In other media ==
Franklin's name was mentioned in the lyrics of the song "Telephone Thing" by The Fall. According to lead singer Mark E. Smith, he thought he had "made up the name", and had not heard of Franklin before.

== Personal life and death ==
Franklin was married to writer John Caswell Garth, who was also business manager of the Wilson Barrett acting company and himself an occasional actor, from 1934 until his death from cancer in 1953 at the age of 50. Franklin, who was 42 at the time, never remarried. They had no children.

Off-screen, Franklin devoted much of her later life to charity and gave away all the royalties she received from EastEnders repeats to her favourite animal charities. "At my age one isn't buying new fur coats and diamonds", she said. "If you get that lot of repeat fees four times a year you can afford to be a bit more generous to other people."

In May 2005 at 93 years old, it was announced that Franklin would present the Lifetime Soap Achievement Award to former colleague June Brown at The British Soap Awards; however, she was too ill to attend. It was instead presented to Brown by another EastEnders actress Anna Wing, who played Lou Beale. Wing mentioned Franklin in her speech.

Franklin died at her home in Barnes on 11 July 2005, four days after her 94th birthday. Her life and work were honoured at the BAFTA Television Awards in 2006.

== Filmography ==
=== Film ===
Year	Title	Role	Notes
1948	Halesapoppin!		Television film
1949	Trottie True	Martha	
1954	The Walking Stick	Flowerwoman	Television film
1955	Before I Wake	Elsie	U.S.title: Shadow of Fear
1956	Cloak Without Dagger	Emmie	
1956	High Terrace	Mrs. Webb	
1957	Bullet from the Past	Mrs. Roper	Scotland Yard (film series)
1957	The Secret Place	Mother	
1957	Stranger in Town	Woman with package	
1959	A Kiss for Cinderella	Marion	Television film
1960	Stuff and Nonsense	Mrs. Fowler	Television film
1960	The Poet	Erminia	Television film
1960	A Lady with Friends	Ivy Lea	Television film
1961	Ticket to Paradise	Mrs. Higginbottom	
1961	Flame in the Streets	Mrs. Bingham	
1961	The Jelly End Strike	Nell	Television film
1962	The Wild and the Willing	Woman	
1963	The Silent Playground	Mrs. Elgin	
1965	Help!	Neighbour	
1965	Die, Monster, Die!	Miss Bailey	
1965	The Murder Game	Landlady	
1967	How I Won the War	Second Old Lady	
1968	Twisted Nerve	Clarkie	
1968	Subterfuge	Bus Conductress	
1971	The Night Visitor	Mrs. Hansen	
1973	The Three Musketeers	d'Artagnan's mother	
1978	The One and Only Phyllis Dixey	Phyllis' Dresser	
1979	Quincy's Quest	Witch	
1980	Dr. Jekyll and Mr. Hyde	Cook	Television film
1981	Ragtime	Elderly Woman	
1984	Return to Waterloo	Woman on Train	Television film

=== Television ===
Year	Title	Role	Notes
1950	BBC Sunday Night Theatre	Mrs. Marble / Sonia	Episode: "Promise of Tomorrow"
1950	BBC Sunday Night Theatre	Mrs. Beetle / Snail	Episode: "The Insect Play"
1951	The Passing Show		Episode: "1930-1939: The Days Before Yesterday"
1953	A Place of Execution	Charlady	Episode: "Eye for an Eye"
1954	Dear Dotty	Mrs. Fuller	Episode: "Cardinal Puff Puff Rides Again"
1955	BBC Sunday Night Theatre	Millie	Episode: "The Makepeace Story #4: The New Executive"
1955	Portrait of Alison	Chambermaid	Episode: "Episode 6"
1956	BBC Sunday Night Theatre	Mrs. Russell	Episode "Shout Aloud Salvation"
1956	BBC Sunday Night Theatre	Mrs. Hook	Episode: "The Seddons"
1956	BBC Sunday Night Theatre	Laura Friswell	Episode: "Henry Irving"
1956	David Copperfield	Mrs. Heep	Recurring role; 2 episodes
1956	ITV Television Playhouse	Nellie	Episode: "All Correct, Sir"
1957	Armchair Theatre	Miss Julia	Episode: "The Mortimer Touch"
1958	BBC Sunday Night Theatre	Woman in Pub	Episode: "Gracie"
1959	Crime Sheet		Episode: "Lockhart Follows a Line"
1959	The Common Room	Miss Parkins	Episode: "A Matter of Ambition"
1959	BBC Sunday Night Theatre	Miss Turner	Episode: "The Gentle Goddess"
1959	The Artful Dodger	Sylvia Morris	Series regular; 6 episodes
1959	ITV Television Playhouse	Mrs. Gravas	Episode: "The Advocate"
1959	Bleak House	Mrs. Guppy	Episode: "The End of the Story"
1959	Saturday Playhouse	Susan Sillsby	Episode: "The Cat and the Canary"
1959	Saturday Playhouse	Mrs. Wilson	Episode: "Unfinished Journey"
1960	BBC Sunday-Night Play	Mrs. Beetle / Aunt	Episode: "Twentieth Century Theatre: The Insect Play"
1960	The Men from Room 13	Mrs. Paterson	Episode: "The Man Who Tried Too Hard: Part 1"
1960	Emergency Ward 10	Mrs. Parkin	Recurring role; 2 episodes
1960	Charlie Drake	Ada	Episode: "We Diet at Dawn"
1960	Saturday Playhouse	Mrs. Catt	Episode: "The Shop at Sly Corner"
1961	Armchair Theatre	Mrs. Chard	Episode: "The Trouble with Our Ivy"
1961	Dixon of Dock Green	Mrs. Bright	Episode: "The Traffic of a Night"
1961	Yorky	Nora	Episode: "The Actress"
1961	Citizen James	Floss	Episode: "Crusty Bread"
1962	BBC Sunday-Night Play	Mrs. Brooks	Episode: "Black Limelight"
1962	BBC Sunday-Night Play	Mrs. Decker	Episode: "Dackson's Wharf"
1962	Silent Evidence	Lily	Episode: "The Chosen Instrument"
1962	Raise Your Glasses		Episode: "Episode 4"
1962	Armchair Theatre	Else	Episode: "Always Something Hot"
1963	ITV Play of the Week	Mabel Dunnock	Episode: "Vicky and the Sultan"
1963	Suspense	Clara	Episode: "Last Race, Ginger Gentleman"
1963	Bootsie and Snudge		Episode: "The Man with the Golden Guts"
1963	Dixon of Dock Green	Ella Mann	Episode: "A Strange Affair"
1963	BBC Sunday-Night Play	Woman	Episode: "June Fall"
1963	Compact	Ella Bedford	Recurring role; 8 episodes
1963	Armchair Theatre	Edie Tidy	Episode: "Little Doris"
1964	Z-Cars	Mrs. McKenna	Episode: "What a Main Event!"
1964	The Protectors	Mrs. Bolland	Episode: "The Deadly Chameleon"
1964	The Four Seasons of Rosie Carr	Amy Bennett	Episode: "Summer in Matlock Street"
1964	Dixon of Dock Green	Mrs. Walcott	Episode: "Man on the Run"
1965	Comedy Playhouse	Else Ramsey	Episode: "Till Death Us Do Part"
1965	ITV Play of the Week	Mrs. Morton	Episode: "No Baby, No Baby at All"
1965	The Scales of Justice	Rose Jenkins	Episode: "The Hidden Face"
1965	Armchair Theatre	Mrs. Marriott	Episode: "The Man Who Came to Die"
1965	Public Eye	Iris	Episode: "A Harsh World for Zealots"
1965	Our Man at St. Mark's	Alice Perry	Episode: "The Invader"
1965	Story Parade	Mrs. Huxtable	Episode: "The Campaign"
1965	Londoners	Mrs. Hincastle	Episode: "A Day Out for Lucy"
1965	Pardon the Expression	Grandma	Episode: "The Wedding"
1965	A Slight Case of...		Episode: "Infifelity"
1965	Steptoe and Son	Aunt Daphne	Episode: "And Afterwards at..."
1965	Danger Man	Miss Wallace	Episode: "Say It with Flowers"
1966	Hugh and I		Episode: "It's In the Stars"
1966	Frankie Howerd		Episode: "Series 2, Episode 5"
1966	Gideon's Way	Martha Bray	Episode: "The Reluctant Witness"
1966	Marriage Lines	Mrs. Baker	Episode: "First House"
1967	Sanctuary	Passenger	Episode: "Has Everyone Heard of Juliet?"
1967	Before the Fringe		Episode: "Series 2, Episode 5"
1967	No – That's Me Over Here!	Mother	Episode: "Series 1, Episode 3"
1967	Dixon of Dock Green	Maggie Briggs	Episode: "The Hunch"
1968	Ooh La La!	Aunt Margueritte	Episode: "What a Wedding"
1968	Gazette	Mrs. Page	Episode: "In Loving Memory"
1968	The Very Merry Widow	Mrs. Fleming	Episode: "Animal Crackers in My Group"
1968	Journey to the Unknown	Mrs. Barrett	Episode: "The Beckoning Fair One"
1969	Z-Cars	Mrs. Rogers	Episode: "None the Worse: Part 4"
1969	Castle Haven	Sarah Meek	Series regular; 107 episodes
1970	The Doctors	Tilly Hicks / Waitress	Recurring role; 3 episodes
1970	Comedy Playhouse	Lily Oakley	Episode: "The Old Contemptible"
1970	Never Say Die	Glenda Catchpole	Episode: "Goodbye Mr. Bridge"
1970	Armchair Theatre	Tea Lady	Episode: "The Company Man"
1971	The Fenn Street Gang	Aunt Harriet	Episode: "A Fair Swap"
1972	Six Days of Justice	Annie	Episode: "A Private Nuisance"
1972	The Organization	Edna	Recurring role; 3 episodes
1972	Budgie	Carrie Wetherall	Episode: "Run Rabbit, Run Rabbit, Run, Run, Run."
1972	Sykes	Book Stall Assistant	Episode: "Marriage"
1972–1973	Follyfoot	Mrs. Porter	Recurring role; 3 episodes
1973	Softly, Softly: Task Force	Mrs. Walters	Episode: "Conspiracy"
1973	Z-Cars	Alice Hulme	Episode: "Suspicion"
1973	Six Days of Justice	Mrs. Silk	Episode: "We'll Support You Evermore"
1973	Black and Blue	Mrs. Pitt	Episode: "Secrets"
1973	Bowler	Mrs. Bowler	Recurring role; 6 episodes
1973	The Adventures of Black Beauty	Mrs. Rodgers	Episode: "The Medicine Man"
1973	The Protectors	Nelly Baxter	Episode: "A Pocketful of Posies"
1974	Crossroads Motel	Myrtle Harvey	Recurring role; 2 episodes
1975	Churchill's People	Mrs. Baxter	Episode: "The Fine Art of Bubble-Blowing"
1975	I Didn't Know You Cared	Auntie Lil	Recurring role; 4 episodes
1976–1979	George and Mildred	Mother	Recurring role; 4 episodes
1977	Nicholas Nickleby	Miss Knag	Episode: "Episode 2"
1978	Hazell	Pearl	Episode: "Hazell Works for Nothing"
1978	Rising Damp	Aunt Maud	Episode: "Great Expectations"
1978	The Famous Five	Mrs. Janes	Episode: "Five Go to Billycock Hill"
1978	The Sweeney	Florence, the Charlady	Episode: "Trust Red"
1978	Some Mothers Do 'Ave 'Em	Mrs. Welch	Episode: "Motorbike"
1979	Danger UXB	Mrs. Flack	Episode: "Just Like a Woman"
1979	Jackanory Playhouse	Miss Lockspith	Episode: "Armitage, Armitage, Fly Away Home"
1979	The Other One	Mrs. Tanner	Episode: "Series 2, Episode 6"
1979	Quatermass	Edna	Miniseries; 3 episodes
1979–1981	The Dick Emery Show	Auntie	Recurring role; 2 episodes
1980	Potter	Lady with Dog	Episode: "Series 2, Episode 4"
1980	Fox		Episode: "Just Another Villain in a Cheap Suit"
1980	How's Your Father?	Coral	Recurring role; 2 episodes
1981	The Other 'Arf	Vi	Episode: "Holding the Baby"
1981	You're Only Young Twice	Gipsy Magdalena	Episode: "The Gipsy's Curse"
1981	Kelly Monteith		Episode: "Series 3, Episode 5"
1981	Terry and June	Cath	Episode: "In Sickness and in Health"
1982	Dead Ernest	Alice	Recurring role; 2 episodes
1983	The Black Adder	Cordelia	Episode: "The Foretelling"
1983	Maybury	Patient	Episode: "Love's Labour: Part 1"
1983	In Loving Memory	Aunt Gertrude	Episode: "Blood Will Out"
1984	Pull the Other One	Elsie	Episode: "Grandma Gets Fit"
1984	Hallelujah!	Old Lady	Episode: "The Snake Pit"
1985	Victoria Wood: As Seen on TV	Old Lady in Library	Episode: "Series 1, Show 6"
1985–2000	EastEnders	Ethel Skinner	Series regular; 370 episodes
1990	The Little and Large Show		Episode: "Series 10, Episode 2"
1990	Keeping Up Appearances	Daddy's Fiance	Episode: "The Charity Shop"
1994	Monster Café	Healthy's Mother	Episode: "Healthy Monster"
