= Erin Gavin =

Scottish actress

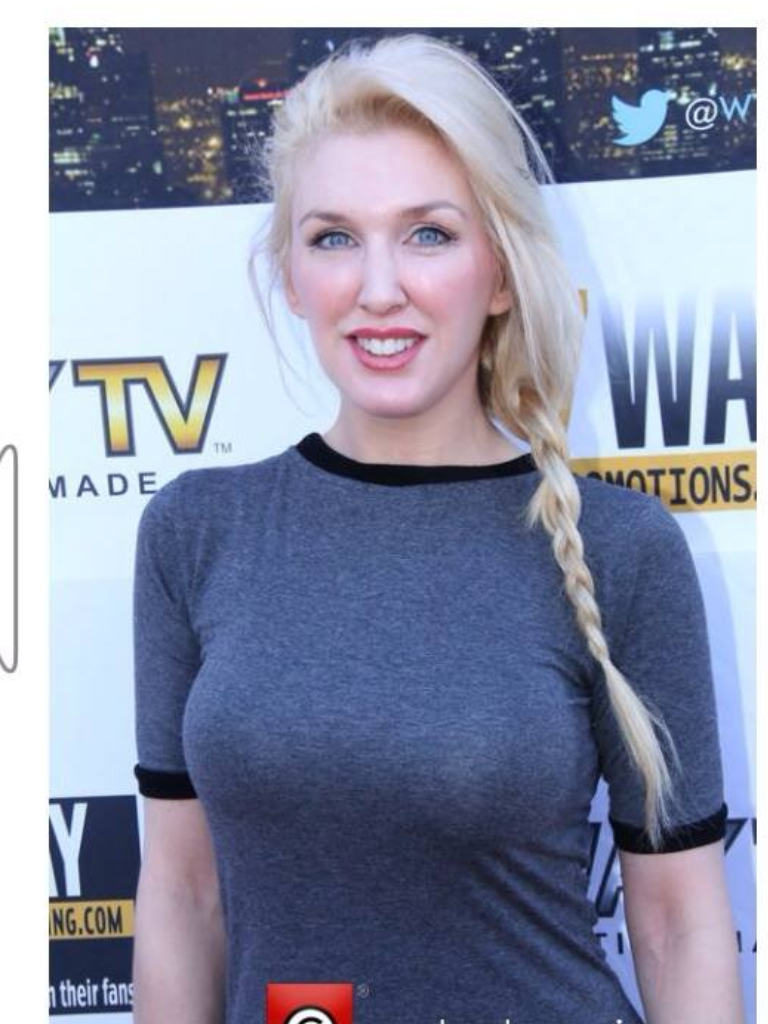
- Born: Glasgow, Scotland
- Occupations: Actress; Entrepreneur
- Years active: 2004–present

Erin Gavin is a Scottish actress and entrepreneur.

== Early life ==
Erin Gavin is originally from Glasgow, Scotland, and she attended The Royal Academy.

== Acting career ==
As a child she played roles in the television series Taggart. She later also had roles on the television series EastEnders, Still Game, and Footballers' Wives, in addition to a role in the horror film Dread before moving from the UK to California. Since that time she has had roles in films and television series including Junk, 1000 Ways To Die, Making Thirty, and the Love Addict. In 2014 Gavin played the role of Marilyn Monroe in the stage play Marilyn: My Secret at the Macha Theatre in Hollywood, California. She also played Monroe in the television film Marilyn: The Last Investigation. co-created a stage play with Sandro Monetti in which she also played Monroe,

Erin is signed with Serdica Records; her first track is called "I'm through with love".

== Agency owner ==
Erin Gavin is the owner of the EGA Talent Agency.
