= Drummonds (TV series) =

- Starring: Richard Pasco
- Country of origin: United Kingdom
- Original language: English
- No. of series: 2
- No. of episodes: 15

Production
- Running time: 60 minutes
- Production company: LWT

Original release
- Network: ITV
- Release: 30 August 1985 – 5 June 1987

Drummonds was a 1985 British television series set in a boarding school for boys during the mid-1950s. It was produced for the ITV by LWT and ran for two seasons between 30 August 1985 and 5 June 1987. It starred Richard Pasco as the school's headmaster, George Drummond and Ciaran Madden as his wife Mary.

The series was filmed at Amesbury School in Surrey, England.
