= Karen Meagher =

British actress (active 1979–2018)

- Born: Birkenhead, England
- Other names: Karen Lloyd
- Occupation: Actress
- Years active: 1979–2018

Karen Meagher is an English actress.

== Early life ==
Meagher was born in the Rock Ferry area of Birkenhead, to a family originally from North Wales.

== Career ==
Meagher's first acting role was as a maid in the 1979 television series The Mallens. This was followed by a role as Miss Broom in the BBC 1980s children's programme Jonny Briggs. She also played a young Lou Beale in the EastEnders special CivvyStreet, a spin-off that was filmed in 1988 but set in 1942.

Meagher is perhaps best known for portraying Ruth Beckett in the 1984 BBC nuclear war drama television film Threads. At the time, she was a member of the Campaign for Nuclear Disarmament and was passionately committed to making a statement about the dangers of nuclear war in the United Kingdom. She also later appeared in a film outlining the risks attached to nuclear power called Chernobyl: The Final Warning.

Meagher has had many other television and film roles, such as Paula, in Experience Preferred...But Not Essential, (1982), Inspector Murchison in Heartbeat and Grace Poole in the 2006 BBC adaptation of Wide Sargasso Sea, as well as smaller roles in Dalziel and Pascoe, Carrie's War, Down to Earth, Doctors, The Bill, Bad Girls, Silent Witness, Sharpe, 28 Weeks Later, and Father Brown. She appeared in the 2007 run of Equus in London's Gielgud Theatre, portraying the nurse, and was also understudy for Jenny Agutter and Gabrielle Reidy's roles.
