= Frances Cuka =

English actress (1936–2020)

- Born: 21 August 1936; London, England
- Died: 16 February 2020 (aged 83); Hampstead, London, England
- Education: Guildhall School of Music and Drama
- Occupation: Actress
- Years active: 1957–2018
- Notable credit(s): Casualty (2006–2009); Friday Night Dinner (2011–2018)

Frances Cuka (21 August 1936 – 16 February 2020) was an English actress, principally on television, whose career spanned over sixty years. In her later years, she was best known for playing Grandma Eleanor "Nellie" Buller in the sitcom Friday Night Dinner from 2011 to 2018.

== Early life and career ==
Cuka (pronounced Chewka) was born on 21 August 1936 in London, the only child of Letitia Alice Annie (née Francis), a tailor, and Joseph Cuka, a process engraver of Czech descent. The family subsequently moved to Hove. As a child, she appeared in BBC radio broadcasts as part of Children's Hour. She trained at the Guildhall School of Music and Drama.

== Theatre roles ==
After the Guildhall, she joined Theatre Workshop; there she performed in Macbeth and then in 1958 created the role of Jo in Shelagh Delaney's play A Taste of Honey, continuing in the role when the play moved to the West End and Broadway. Between runs of A Taste of Honey she appeared in several plays at the Royal Court Theatre, including Endgame and Live Like Pigs. In 1963 she played Becky Sharp in the musical Vanity Fair, alongside George Baker and Dame Sybil Thorndike.

== Television ==
Cuka then moved into television. Her subsequent television roles included the 1971 BBC miniseries adaption of Jane Austen's Sense and Sensibility, Adam Adamant Lives, Hammer House of Horror (the episode "Charlie Boy"), The Champions and Minder. She also appeared as Doll Tearsheet in a BBC TV version of Henry IV, Part II. She had recurring roles in the soap operas Crossroads and Coronation Street. Her film roles have included Scrooge (1970) as Bob Cratchit's wife, and Henry VIII and his Six Wives (1972) as Catherine of Aragon.

Cuka was cast as Peggy Mitchell in the BBC1 soap opera EastEnders when the character was first introduced in 1991. She had filmed several scenes of the character but they were scrapped; Jo Warne was then cast in the role.

From 2006 to 2009, Cuka played the recurring role of a homeless woman called Mrs Bassey in the popular medical drama Casualty. Her final appearance was in September 2009, when her character died from severe burns after being involved in an explosion at a shopping centre.

In 2010, Cuka played Lady Bracknell for Logos Theatre Company at Upstairs at the Gatehouse, in the unusual four-act version of The Importance of Being Earnest.

From March 2011, Cuka appeared in the Channel 4 sitcom Friday Night Dinner, as Grandma Nelly Buller. She had to leave the show in 2018 due to illness, making a final cameo contribution in the series 5 episode "The Violin" (as a voice on the telephone).

== Death ==
Cuka died after suffering a stroke at her home in Hampstead, London on 16 February 2020, aged 83.

== Selected Filmography ==
Year	Title	Role	Notes
1961	Over the Odds	Hilda Summers	
1966	Emergency Ward 10	Dr. Lucy Newton	4 episodes
1967	Adam Adamant Lives!	Sandra Verrel	Episode: "A Sinister Sort of Service"
1969	The Champions	Anna Maria Martes	Episode: "Get Me Out of Here!"
1970	Scrooge	Ethel Cratchit	
1971	Sense and Sensibility	Lucy Steele	2 episodes
1972	Henry VIII and his Six Wives	Catherine of Aragon	
1972	Hide and Seek	Mrs. Dickie	
1972	Pretenders	Alice	2 episodes
1974	Within These Walls	Shirely Armstrong	Episode: "Tea on St. Pancras Station"
1979	Crown Court (TV series)	Dorothy Ryan	
1979	Henry IV, Part II	Doll Tearsheet	TV movie
1980	Hammer House of Horror	Gwen	Episode: "Charlie Boy"
1980	The Watcher in the Woods	Mary Fleming	
1981	Together	Margaret Frisby	2 episodes
1987	Crossroads	Mary Lancaster	Guest role
1988	The Attic: The Hiding of Anne Frank	Mrs. Van Daan	Television film
1988	CivvyStreet	Lil Sewell	EastEnders spin-off episode
1990	Mountains of the Moon	Lady Houghton	
1991	Afraid of the Dark	Mrs. Dalton	
1991	EastEnders	Peggy Mitchell	Unaired scenes
1992	Maigret	Angela Louette	Episode: "Maigret and the Mad Woman"
1992	The Ruth Rendell Mysteries	Lois Knox	Episode: "The Speaker of Mandarin" (Part 1)
1994	Minder	Sister Angelica	Episode: "The Immaculate Conception"
1997	Snow White: A Tale of Terror	Nannau	
1997	Wycliffe	Angie Kene	Episode: "Close to Home"
2000	Trial & Retribution	Eva Wildelski	2 episodes
2001, 2003	The Bill	Mrs. Jones; Sandra Fletcher	2 episodes
2001, 2005, 2007	Doctors	Lillie Goodwin; Maeve Richards; Martha Tanner	3 episodes
2003	Swimming Pool	Lady on the underground	
2004	Rosemary & Thyme	Barbara Boxer	Episode: Swords into Ploughshares
2005	Oliver Twist	Mrs. Bedwin	
2006–2009	Casualty	Mrs. Bassey	Recurring role, 7 episodes
2011–2018	Friday Night Dinner	Grandma Eleanor "Nelly" Buller	Supporting role, 12 episodes
2012, 2014	Holby City	Esther Levy	3 episodes
2014	Closer to the Moon	Sarah	
