= Lou Beale =

Fictional character from EastEnders

- EastEnders character
- Anna Wing as Lou Beale (1987)
- Portrayed by: Anna Wing; Karen Meagher (flashback)
- Duration: 1985–1988
- First appearance: Episode 1 "Poor Old Reg"; 19 February 1985
- Last appearance: Episode 362; 26 July 1988
- Created by: Tony Holland
- Introduced by: Julia Smith
- Book appearances: Home Fires Burning; Swings and Roundabouts; Good Intentions; The Flower of Albert Square
- Spin-off appearances: CivvyStreet (1988)
- Lou as she appeared in CivvyStreet, played by Karen Meagher (1988)
In-universe information
- Other names: Louise Ada Medeemey
- Family: Beale
- Mother: Mrs Medeemey
- Brothers: Terence
- Sisters: Flo; Doris Miller; Liz; Elsie; Queenie
- Husband: Albert Beale (backstory)
- Sons: Harry Beale; Ronnie Beale; Kenny Beale; Pete Beale
- Daughters: Maggie Flaherty; Dora Beale; Pauline Fowler; Norma Beale
- Grandsons: Eamonn Flaherty; Conor Flaherty; John Flaherty; Tommy Flaherty; David Wicks; Ian Beale; Mark Fowler; Martin Fowler
- Granddaughters: Michelle Fowler; Elizabeth Beale
- Other relatives: Vicki Fowler; Mark Fowler Jnr; Bex Fowler; Hope Fowler; Roman Fowler; Bianca Jackson; Joe Wicks; Lucy Beale; Peter Beale; Bobby Beale; Eamonn Flaherty Jnr; Declan Flaherty; Carl Flaherty; Colette Flaherty; Kylie Flaherty; Mary Flaherty; Liam Butcher; Tiffany Butcher; Morgan Butcher; Louie Beale; Jimmy Beale; Holly Wicks

Lou Beale is a fictional character from the BBC soap opera EastEnders, played by Anna Wing. Her first appearance is in the first episode, which was broadcast on 19 February 1985, and her last is in episode 362, first shown on 26 July 1988, after which the character was killed off. The character is played by Karen Meagher in the 1988 EastEnders flashback special, CivvyStreet, set during World War II. She appears in 232 episodes.

Lou Beale was the first EastEnders character to be created by series co-creator Tony Holland, taking the inspiration for some of the series' earliest characters from his own London family and background.

Lou is the archetypal East End matriarch throughout EastEnders' first three years. An intimidating force within the local community, she is the dowager of Albert Square's central family, the Beales and Fowlers. Never afraid to speak her mind, and woe betide anyone who manages to get on her wrong side, Lou has the respect of her friends and family, even if they do find her a bit of a nuisance at times.

== Character creation and development ==
=== Background ===
The creators of EastEnders, Tony Holland and Julia Smith, had always intended the programme to be primarily based around a large family "in old East-end tradition". By the 1980s, such families were on the decline in the East End. Natives had begun to emigrate out of East London to the wider area around Ilford, Romford, Chelmsford and Eastbourne. However, there were still some that refused to uproot and leave the area that had been home to many generations of their family.

To construct the focal family, Holland and Smith were helped considerably by Tony Holland's recollections of his own East End background. Lou was the first EastEnders character to be created. She was based on Holland's aunt Lou Beale, one of four sisters from a large Walthamstow family. Lou was mother to his cousins Peter and Pauline and married to Albert – a family set-up that would eventually be recreated on-screen and would go on to be forever hailed as the first family of EastEnders, the Beales and Fowlers. Peter Batt, who was one of the original scriptwriters of EastEnders, has stated that elements of Lou Beale were based on his mother.

Lou was the first character created by Smith and Holland for the show. Her original character outline as written by series creators Julia Smith and Tony Holland appeared in an abridged form in their book, EastEnders: The Inside Story: "A lively 70 year old. Archetypal East-end mother-earth figure. Fat, funny, sometimes loud, often openly sentimental. An obsessive view of family...she can be a stubborn cruel "old bag" when she wants to be, sometimes keeping "atmospheres" going for months. It was always Lou's house that was used for the big family celebrations. Especially Christmas. Twenty or more people crammed into a tiny house. Five sisters wedged into a minuscule kitchen; drinking gin and orange; wearing funny hats; all wearing aprons; laughing raucously and trying to cook a huge dinner at the same time. Lou's house was also the meeting place for the family Sunday teas. Ham, or tinned salmon salad. Bread and butter. Jelly and tinned cream. And, tea...the changing face of the area (especially the immigrants) is a constant source of fear to her, but then she doesn't go out much. She prefers to be at home, or on a trip down memory lane: day trips to Southend – the Kursaal, Rossi's ice-cream and a plate of cockles; one wonderful week's holiday in a caravan in Clacton; fruit picking in Essex; Christmas; weddings; street parties...She has a soft spot for her son, Pete..." (page 51).

=== Casting ===
The actress Anna Wing, who was now 70 years old and had been acting since the late 1930s, auditioned for the role. She was so keen to play the part that she turned up for the audition clutching her birth certificate to prove she was a Hackney greengrocer's daughter and implored the producers to give her the job. When she first read for the part Holland and Smith felt that "she overacted terribly", but on the second reading she "brought the performance down considerably". There were initial fears over whether an actress of her age would have the stamina to survive EastEnders' gruelling schedule, but when asked if she'd like to be in a popular soap, Wing replied "All my life I've been an actress, now I want to be a household name!"

Wing was set to appear in a stage play of Adrian Mole, which would have clashed with the filming of EastEnders. Julia Smith refused to offer her any leeway and informed her that she had to take a gamble – she could either turn down the play, meaning that if she failed to get the part of Lou she would have lost two jobs, or she could give up the possibility of playing Lou and accept the play. Wing decided to turn down the play and she was subsequently given the role of Lou. An early choice in the casting process, Wing had the face, voice and attitude that Tony Holland had imagined for the character. She was told by producers to bring something from her own background to the role.

=== Narrative, impact and progression ===
Lou's fierce demeanour made an impact from the opening episode, with one of the popular press in Britain (The Sun newspaper) running the headline "Enter the dragon... Lou Beale!"

Lou was a frightening matriarch who domineered over both the Beale and Fowler families and most of her neighbours in Walford as well. The character did have a softer side, most often seen when interacting with her grandchildren. She was depicted as the linchpin of the Walford community and was often first to rally around her neighbours in times of trouble, or instruct various members of her clan to do so in her stead.

She was a family orientated character, particularly opposed to change and determined to hold on to the ever-diminishing traditions of the East End. Most of her storylines were family based, which included various feuds, most notably with Pat Wicks (Pam St. Clement), the ex-wife of her son who showed up in Walford in 1986. Various scandals and hardships were thrown at the character and her family, which she stoically battled through in order to keep the close-knit family that she presided over, together. The character was also used for comedy, most regularly with the other older characters, Dot Cotton (June Brown) and Ethel Skinner (Gretchen Franklin), and she had a tendency to take to her bed and feign sickness if she didn't get her own way. Her relationship with son-in-law Arthur (Bill Treacher) was another on-going sub-plot often used for comical effect – Lou portraying the stereotypical nagging mother-in-law and Arthur being the main protagonist for most of her displeasure, although they did share moments of closeness as well.

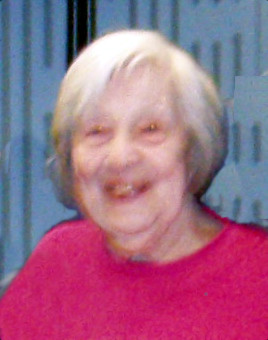
Actress Anna Wing (pictured) pictured in 2007

However, in 1988 Anna Wing began to grow disillusioned with the direction the show was going in. She felt EastEnders did not fit in with her beliefs as a Quaker, commenting "We had 31 million viewers and it was shown all over the world, and I suddenly thought 'Should I be in this?'...I had a crisis of conscience." After three years playing Lou, Anna Wing asked to be written out. Wing has since revealed that creator Julia Smith was devastated when she decided to leave, commenting "she said I could have been in it for ever and ever until I popped off for real."

The character was subsequently killed off, dying in her sleep in July 1988 after being frequently ill throughout the year. The character's final episodes were written by Tony Holland and directed by Julia Smith. Lou spent her final day arranging her affairs, seeing various members of her family, passing on advice and giving them presents and at the end of the episode she announced: "That's you lot sorted. I can go now." At the start of episode 363, Lou was found to have died peacefully in her sleep. The episode then jumped a few days later to the day of her funeral – an emotional episode, which featured Pete breaking down at Lou's graveside and ended with him proposing a toast in the Vic to absent friends and that "bloody old bag." The episode was also notable for featuring, for the first time, a train crossing the railway viaduct in Bridge Street – a special-effects shot commissioned especially for the occasion. The train was actually a ten-second illusion, produced by the BBC's electronic workshop. One EastEnders official commented: "It cost an arm and a leg, but old Lou was worth it."

=== Continuity regarding children ===
Lou is a central character, who remains at the heart of the series during her time on screen and is later still occasionally referred to by long-running characters in a nostalgic nod back to the show's early history. There remains, however, a certain level of uncertainty and conflicting information regarding the character's background, in particular the number of offspring she supposedly produced.

In the show's earliest episodes, Pauline Fowler (Wendy Richard) and Pete Beale (Peter Dean) are the only two of Lou's offspring to feature on screen. Through character dialogue in episodes first shown in July 1985, the audience are told of the existence of four other children: Keith, Paul, Norma and Shirley – who were said to be living in Billericay, Romford and Eastbourne. As the series progressed, Keith, Paul and Shirley were apparently forgotten in favour of other children and were not mentioned again; Norma was mentioned occasionally throughout 1985.

In the episode first shown on 28 October 1986, viewers are made aware of another child who lives in New Zealand, Kenny Beale. In addition, the character of Lou Beale also features heavily within a series of spin-off EastEnders novels by Hugh Miller, set prior to 1985 and published in 1986. Within the novelisations readers are introduced to further characters from Lou's history: sons Harry and Ronnie, a daughter Dora and siblings Elsie, Liz, Queenie and Terence. Kenny also features in the books. In the EastEnders novels, Harry, Dora and Ronnie have moved away from home when in their twenties and have lost contact with their mother. The Beales' fruit and veg stall on Bridge Street market is said to have passed to Ronnie after his father's death, and again passed to Pete when Ronnie moved away from Walford.

Kenny appeared in EastEnders for a brief stint in episodes shown in February 1988, and is seen as a young child in the December 1988 spin-off CivvyStreet. Harry and Ronnie also appear in the spin-off episode, but do not appear in the television serial itself, although Ronnie was directly mentioned in the episode first shown on 11 December 1986.

In 1997, another of Lou's children is introduced: Maggie Flaherty (Olivia Shanley), her eldest child, who was placed for adoption as she was born out of wedlock. Other than the already established Pete, Pauline and Kenny, Maggie remains the only sibling to appear in the on-screen serial. In 2000, an EastEnders book was published entitled EastEnders Who's Who. The book pertains to the existence of Ronnie and yet another child, Maureen, who had both died. Harry and Dora are not mentioned in the book and neither Maureen nor Dora has been mentioned or seen on-screen, however, Pauline recounts the story of Arthur proposing to her on her unnamed sister's wedding day on multiple occasions.

== Storylines ==
=== Backstory ===
Born in the East End at the outbreak of World War I, Lou lived in Walford all her life. She was born into a large working-class East End family, the youngest of seven siblings, and grew up with a strong sense of community spirit. In the 1930s, she fell in love with a local boy, Albert Beale (Gary Olson), and gave birth to his daughter, Maggie (Olivia Shanley), but placed her for adoption because she was born out of wedlock. By 1936, Lou and Albert had married and in 1938 moved to 45 Albert Square. They had six more children: Harry (Aaron Mason), Ronnie (Chase Marks), Dora, Kenny (Michael Attwell), and twins Pete (Peter Dean) and Pauline Beale (Wendy Richard). Albert died in 1965, and Lou remained in the same house with Pauline and her husband, Arthur Fowler (Bill Treacher). Lou regularly intervened in her family's affairs, especially when she disapproved of Pete's relationship with Kathy Hills (Gillian Taylforth) because he had previously divorced his first wife, Pat (Pam St Clement), and she had banished her son Kenny to New Zealand in the 1960s for having an affair with Pat. Lou then watched her grandchildren Michelle (Susan Tully), Mark (David Scarboro/Todd Carty) and Ian Beale (Adam Woodyatt) grow up, with Pauline, Pete, Arthur and Kathy looking after her in her old age. In one episode she claims she was one of seven children, one boy and six girls, and on Christmas Day 1987, she states she is from a family of eight, five boys and three girls.

=== 1985–1988 ===
Lou's affinity and ties with the area mean that she tends to view Albert Square as her own and thinks that gives her an excuse to intrude into people's business as she sees fit. She is great friends with Dot Cotton (June Brown) and Ethel Skinner (Gretchen Franklin), her lifelong neighbours. She also has a good relationship with the local general practitioner, Dr Legg (Leonard Fenton) and an old Jewish pawnbroker known only as 'Uncle' (Leonard Maguire).

Lou has a tempestuous relationship with her children-in-law Kathy Beale (Gillian Taylforth) and Arthur Fowler (Bill Treacher), blaming Kathy for Pete's first divorce (something Lou regards as unnatural, despite her fervent dislike of Pat), and showing displeasure at Arthur's unemployment; nothing he does is ever good enough for her daughter Pauline. In February 1985, she is furious to discover that Pauline is pregnant for the third time, her family already financially crippled by Arthur's long stint of unemployment. Lou gives Pauline and Arthur the choice of an abortion, having the baby adopted or keeping the baby, but they will not be allowed to live in her house. The family try to bring her round, but she finally is won round when the family organise her a holiday in Clacton-on-Sea. Lou supports her grandson Ian Beale's (Adam Woodyatt) choice to work in catering, which Ian's father Pete does not approve of, wanting Ian to have a more masculine career. Lou is delighted at having another grandson named Martin (Jon Peyton Price), although she would have preferred him to be named Albert after her late husband. Her 16-year-old granddaughter Michelle Fowler (Susan Tully) finds out she is pregnant and Lou, Pauline and Kathy discuss Michelle's options, settling on an abortion, but if Michelle wanted the baby, she could stay with Kathy's sister Stephanie, though Michelle is furious with them deciding for her. Lou collapses in late 1985, prompting Dr Legg to send Lou into hospital for some tests and she is diagnosed with angina. The family have to make changes within the household to accommodate Lou's health problems, such as moving her bedroom downstairs, however, Lou doesn't take well to the changes. Lou has a long-standing feud with Pat, having never forgiven her for having an affair with Kenny. Lou is plagued with mixed feelings when Kenny returns to London in 1988, after banishing him from their lives twenty years before. She has always had a difficult relationship with her son, feeling him to be "too big for the Square" and fears that Pat's revelation, that he is the true father of Pete's son Simon (Nick Berry), will tear her beloved family apart. Before his return to New Zealand, Lou manages to make amends with her estranged son, despite Pat's malicious stirring – who later admits to Simon that Brian Wicks (Leslie Schofield) is his real father after all.

In her later years, Lou is plagued with ill-health. In July 1988, she returns from a holiday in her beloved Leigh-on-Sea feeling distinctly unwell. Fearing she is dying, she takes the opportunity to announce to her nearest and dearest exactly what she thinks of them, even managing to make a truce of sorts with nemesis Pat. After gathering her clan of Beales and Fowlers around her, she has a few choice words of wisdom and encouragement for each family member. The next morning, she is discovered dead in her bed by Pauline, having died peacefully in her sleep the previous night. Her friends and family mourn her death affectionately, never quite managing to forget the irreplaceable "old bag".

=== Legacy ===
The youngest of seven siblings, Lou was from a large East End family herself. Only her sister Flo (Linda Robson) came to outlive her. In 1990, Harry Osborne (John Boswall) returns to Albert Square – he had been engaged to Lou's sister, Doris, but she married Morris Miller after Harry was presumed dead in the war. In 1993, Lou's relative Nellie Ellis (Elizabeth Kelly) comes to stay with Pauline and Arthur. In 1997, it is discovered that Lou had given birth to another daughter, also fathered by Albert, who Lou had placed for adoption because she was conceived out of wedlock. Pauline, Ian and Mark travel to Ireland later that year to reunite with their long-lost family member, Maggie. In 2001, Mark names his stepdaughter Louise Mitchell (Rachel Cox) after Lou. In 2015, Ian's grandson Louie Beale (Oscar Winehouse) is also named after Lou.

== Reception ==
In 2013, following Wing's death, John Tydeman from The Guardian called Lou "cantankerous" and wrote that Wing was "nothing like" the character. Ian Hyland from Daily Mirror wrote that he was surprised that Lou had only appeared for three years as he assumed that she had been on the soap for longer due to being "such a legend". He also called Lou "the hardest of all the soap matriarchs" and that he was puzzled as to why the character was killed off. Hyland also compared the character to Annie Sugden (Sheila Mercier) and Annie Walker (Doris Speed) but opined that Lou had a "harder edge" and that it was a "shame" that the character did not appear for longer. Hyland also wrote that Lou "ran Albert Square" and told readers that they could not "mess with her", as well as commenting on how "hapless grandson Ian could do with having her around to fight his corner these days" and that she would have not allowed him to end up "on the street". In 2020, Sara Wallis and Ian Hyland from The Daily Mirror placed Lou 50th on their ranked list of the Best EastEnders characters of all time, calling her "stubborn" and "Queen of the withering put-down".
