= Anna Wing =

English actress (1914–2013)

Anna Wing MBE
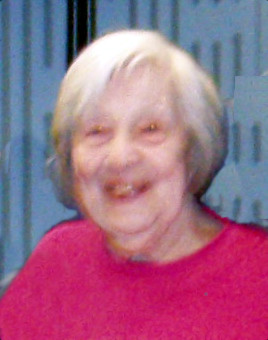
- Wing in 2007
- Born: 30 October 1914; Hackney, London, England
- Died: 7 July 2013 (aged 98); Enfield, London, England
- Occupation: Actress
- Years active: 1938–2012
- Television: EastEnders
- Spouse: Peter Davey (m. 1947; div. 1950)
- Partner: Philip O'Connor (1953–1960)
- Children: 2, including Mark Wing-Davey
- Relatives: Anita Carey (daughter-in-law)

Anna Wing (30 October 1914 – 7 July 2013) was a British actress who had a long career in television and theatre, known for playing Beale family matriarch Lou Beale in the BBC soap opera EastEnders.

== Early life ==
Wing was born in Hackney, London on 30 October 1914, and started out as an artist's model and later, during the Second World War, worked in East End hospitals. In 1947, she married the actor Peter Davey, by whom she had a son, actor-director Mark Wing-Davey, but the marriage ended in divorce in 1950. Her seven years as the lover of Philip O'Connor, a surrealist writer and contemporary of Stephen Spender and Laurie Lee, saw her spend some time as a nursery teacher in West London. With her new lover she had a second son, Jon O'Connor.

== Career ==
Wing is best known for playing the Beale and Fowler family matriarch Lou Beale on EastEnders from the show's inception in February 1985, until the character was killed off in July 1988. She quit her role in the hit show as she was unhappy with the direction in which it was going, but later reflected that it may not have been the right decision.

Wing studied at the Croydon School of Acting in London, and appeared in London repertory theatre for over 65 years. She also performed in Canada at the Stratford Festival in 1967.

She made an earlier soap appearance in Market in Honey Lane for ATV in the late 1960s. She also had a role in the Doctor Who serial Kinda in 1982. Other TV credits include The Witches and the Grinnygog, Dixon of Dock Green, Z-Cars, Play for Today and in 1976 in The Sweeney episode On the Run in which she played Mrs. Haldane. Her film career included roles in Billy Liar (1963), Two Gentlemen Sharing (1969), The 14 (1973) which also featured her future EastEnders co-star June Brown, A Doll's House starring Jane Fonda (1973), Providence (1977), The Hound of the Baskervilles (1978), The Ploughman's Lunch (1983), and 3 British horror films – Full Circle (1977), The Godsend (1980) and Xtro (1983), in which her character was killed by a life-size Action Man doll.

After leaving EastEnders, Wing continued to work on stage, playing the medium, Madame Arcati, in Noël Coward's comedy Blithe Spirit. She also had numerous television roles, including parts in Casualty, Doctors, French and Saunders, The Bill, as well as adding her vocal talents to the animated series Fungus the Bogeyman. Her later film credits included The Calcium Kid with Orlando Bloom, Tooth (2004), in which she played an ancient fairy), and Grandma in the 2007 film Son of Rambow.

In May 2005, she attended the British Soap Awards, where she presented June Brown with a lifetime achievement award for Brown's portrayal of Dot Branning in EastEnders. In 2005, by now aged 91, Wing formed part of the cast of the short film Ex Memoria, directed by Josh Appignanesi and produced by Oscar-winning producer Mia Bays. The short film tells of an elderly woman's struggle with Alzheimer's disease. Ex Memoria was nominated for a British Independent Film Award for Best Short in 2006.

In 2009, aged 94, she worked on a short film, Numbers Up, from Guildhall Pictures. The same year Wing was appointed Member of the Order of the British Empire (MBE) in the 2009 Birthday Honours for her services to drama and charity.

In April 2012, she appeared in the music video for Quarrel's 'Is It Cool?'.

== Later life and death ==
Wing was a member of the Religious Society of Friends, the Quakers, and supported the Campaign for Nuclear Disarmament.

She attended the funeral of her EastEnders on-screen daughter Wendy Richard on 9 March 2009.

Wing died in the London Borough of Enfield on 7 July 2013, at the age of 98. The episode of EastEnders that was broadcast the following day was dedicated to her memory and was immediately followed by a 90-second long BBC News report, the headlines of which included her death. Her funeral took place in London. Adam Woodyatt was amongst the mourners.
