= Ian Beale =

Soap opera character

- EastEnders character
- Portrayed by: Adam Woodyatt
- Duration: 1985–present
- First appearance: Episode 1 "Poor Old Reg"; 19 February 1985
- Created by: Tony Holland
- Introduced by: Julia Smith (1985); Chris Clenshaw (2022)
- Spin-off appearances: Dimensions in Time (1993); EastEnders: E20 (2010); Last Tango in Walford (2010); The Walford Apprentice (2012); The Ghosts of Ian Beale (2014); The Queen Vic Quiz Night (2020); Race Across Yorkshire (2023); Tracey: A Day in the Life (2024)
In-universe information
- Other names: Ian Albert Beale
- Occupation: Student; Amateur boxer Chef; Businessman; Cashier; Café owner Chip shop owner Landlord; Politician; Councillor; Caterer; Restaurant owner Laundrette owner
- Family: Beale/Watts
- Father: Pete Beale
- Mother: Kathy Beale
- Stepfather: Phil Mitchell; Gavin Sullivan; Tom "Rocky" Cotton
- Half-brothers: David Wicks; Ben Mitchell
- Half-sisters: Donna Ludlow
- Wife: Cindy Williams (1989–1997); Mel Healy (1999–2001); Laura Dunn (2001–2004); Jane Collins (2007–2011, 2015–2020); Sharon Watts (2020–2021)
- Sons: Peter Beale; Bobby Beale
- Daughters: Lucy Beale
- Adoptive sons: Steven Beale
- Adoptive daughters: Cindy Williams Jnr (ward)
- Stepsons: Albie Watts
- Grandsons: Louie Beale; Jimmy Beale
- Grandfathers: Albert Beale
- Grandmothers: Lou Beale
- Uncles: Harry Beale; Ronnie Beale; Kenny Beale; Ted Hills
- Aunts: Maggie Flaherty; Pauline Fowler
- Nephews: Joe Wicks
- Nieces: Bianca Jackson; Karen Wicks; Lexi Pearce
- First cousins: Eamonn Flaherty; John Flaherty; Conor Flaherty; Elizabeth Beale; Mark Fowler; Michelle Fowler; Martin Fowler; Tony Hills; Sarah Hills
- Other relatives: Mary Flaherty; Vicki Fowler; Mark Fowler Jnr; Bex Fowler; Hope Fowler; Roman Allen; Liam Butcher; Tiffany Butcher; Morgan Butcher

Ian Beale is a fictional character from the BBC soap opera EastEnders, played by Adam Woodyatt. He is one of four remaining original characters, the others being his mother, Kathy Beale (Gillian Taylforth), his long standing best friend and ex-wife, Sharon Watts (Letitia Dean) and Queen Vic barmaid, Tracey (Jane Slaughter). The character appeared in his 2,000th episode in the show on 26 March 2007, and his 3,000th on 27 May 2016. Woodyatt took an extended hiatus from EastEnders on 22 January 2021. He made guest appearances on 12 December 2022 and 22 June 2023, prior to a full-time return on 22 August of that year. Ian is the longest-serving regular EastEnders character, and second overall, behind only Tracey.

Ian is the most-married character in EastEnders history, with six marriages to five women: Cindy Williams (Michelle Collins), Mel Healy (Tamzin Outhwaite), Laura Dunn (Hannah Waterman), twice to Jane Collins (Laurie Brett), and Sharon Watts (Letitia Dean). He has also had three aborted engagements: to Mandy Salter (Nicola Stapleton), Denise Fox (Diane Parish) and Cindy respectively. He has fathered three children (Peter, Lucy, and Bobby Beale, raised Cindy's son Steven Beale, who he believed to be his, and was the guardian of Cindy's daughter, Cindy Williams. Ian is the owner of 45 Albert Square, traditionally represented within the series as the family home of the Beale and Fowler family. In 2020, he bought The Queen Victoria public house for Sharon, leaving after she poisoned him in revenge for his involvement in Dennis Rickman Jnr's (Bleu Landau) death on EastEnders' 35th anniversary.

Upon his return in 2023, he returns to 45 Albert Square reunited with his first wife Cindy after reuniting off-screen the year prior, who was going by the pseudonym "Rose Knight", after faking her death 25 years prior in a witness protection scheme due to giving information about her criminal inmate, Jackie Ford. After Cindy's witness protection officer reveals that Jackie has died, Cindy resumes her former life. During the Christmas 2024 special, Cindy's affair with Junior Knight (Micah Balfour) was revealed and Ian became a suspect in the "Who Attacked Cindy?" storyline for the show's 40th anniversary. In 2026, Ian becomes a councillor, defeating Elaine Peacock (Harriet Thorpe), with whom he later begins a secret relationship. Ian's happiness, however, is short-lived when he is arrested for hitting four-year-old Jordan Fox (Jahsaiah Williams) when he is driving over the limit, for which he is sentenced to eight months in prison.

== Creation ==
=== Background and casting ===
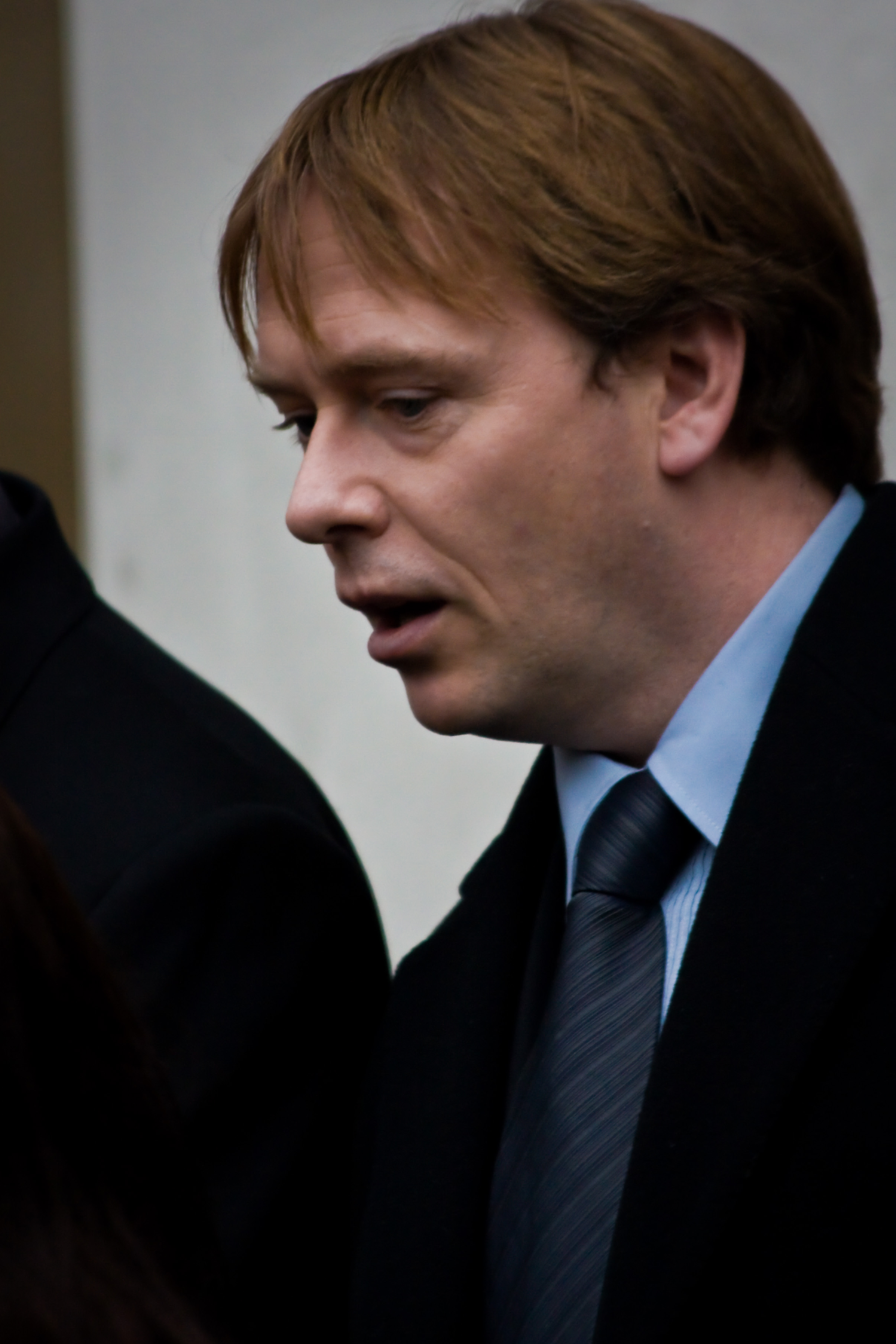
Adam Woodyatt (pictured) was cast as Ian, after licensing regulations required Ian's actor to be at least 16-years old, who could "play down".

Ian Beale is one of the original 23 characters written by the creators of EastEnders, Tony Holland and Julia Smith. Ian is a member of the first family created for EastEnders, the Beale family, and Holland took the inspiration for some of the series' earliest characters from his own London family and background. Like other characters, Ian was based on a member of Holland's family, being his nephew. Ian's original character outline as written by Smith and Holland appeared in an abridged form in their book, EastEnders: The Inside Story.

There is a pressure from home to do well at school and he may be a bit worried that he's not doing as well as they hope. The shadow of his father (however fictional the image is) and the pressure to be a man's man and a chip off the old block might cause trouble in the future. A point is going to be reached when Ian is going to have to assert himself as himself. He can't allow his father to live his life, by proxy, through him. Or, maybe he can...? (page 56)

Because Gillian Taylforth, who was cast as Ian's mother, Kathy, was fair-haired, they also wanted him to be fair, and because of Taylforth's age, he also had to look very young. Ian was meant to be 14 years old when the programme first aired, but because of licensing regulations, the actor cast was required to be a 16-year-old who could "play down". Adam Woodyatt, born in East London, had worked as an actor in his youth, but had given it up and relocated with his family to Wales. He was recruited from his old agency and it was decided that he was perfect for the part and he was subsequently cast as Ian.

=== Characterisation ===
Ian has been described as a character viewers love to hate. His initial storylines portrayed him as a "young and innocent boy" with professional aspirations that went against his father's wishes. Not content to follow in his father's footsteps and take over the family fruit and veg stall, Ian wanted to become a chef and this caused a certain amount of hostility between him and his father, who viewed the occupation as effeminate. Ian's keenness to succeed in his business ventures continued as the character grew, so much so that he started using underhand methods in order to get what he wanted and became one of the soap's most renowned "slimeballs". The character is regularly referred to as a "weasel" in the British press.

"The significance of the Ian Beale character is in its perfect rendering of the influence the political climate had on the development of young people in the 1980s. Developing entrepreneurial skills, making money, ignoring the consequences for others – after all they had been told that there was no such thing as society – was a praiseworthy effort for young people during the mercenary go-getting prime-minister inspired 1980s."

Author Dorothy Hobson has described Ian as a typical Thatcher's child, a term used to reference children who grew up under the Conservative government of the 1980s and who adopted an ideology, such as personal financial gain, self-sufficiency and disregard of the welfare of those who are less well-off. As a result, Hobson suggests that Ian is "young, ambitious, rich and unhappy", which she claims is a perfect reflection of the spirit of the age.

In her book, Who's Who?, Kate Lock described Ian as "wimpy, perhaps not what you'd call a man's man [...] trying to turn Walford into the capital of Capitalism [...] Somewhere along the line, Ian evolved into an obsessive, obnoxious money-monster [...] Ian always pretended to be magnanimous, doing things for the community [...] but it's inspired by self-interest."

Hobson suggests that Ian's saving grace is that he is a "passionately caring father" and Woodyatt has suggested that Ian is a chameleon, a description he claims former executive producer, Louise Berridge, used to describe the character. Woodyatt commented in 2010, "Whatever [Berridge] wanted Ian to do, she'd find a way of justifying it. It's true. He can be nice to his family but he can be devious with them as well. He can stitch people up but can be very generous. You can get away with doing anything with Ian. It's probably why I'm still here."

=== Longevity ===
Ian went on to become one of the longest running characters in the soap opera's history, after debuting in the very first episode of EastEnders. Woodyatt confirmed his desire to remain with the show in 2010, during the show's 25th anniversary celebrations: "Why would I want to leave when I'm not going to get the chance to portray even half the range of emotions I get to here in a one-off drama or a six-part series? And you're not going to get the same viewing figures either. You have your moments when things go wrong and you perhaps don't want to work with a certain person. In any office there are going to be people who don't get along but you get on with it and on the whole I enjoy it. Over the last couple of years we've had a really tight crew and it's the best atmosphere I can remember. There have been peaks and troughs, like with any show, but right now things are good."

In August 2020, it was announced that Woodyatt would be taking an "extended break" from EastEnders and left on-screen on 22 January 2021. He later said in November 2021 that he didn't know if or when he would return to the serial, which meant that Ian was replaced by extra, Tracey (Jane Slaughter), as the longest running EastEnders character, due to her appearance in the first episode, as well as Ian. Ian has since returned and is still the longest running regular character, but the third in total length, after Tracey and Winston (Ulric Browne), who have both been extras since 1985.

== Development ==
=== Early storylines ===
Ian's first major storyline on the soap was his aspiration to become a chef, and his father Pete Beale's (Peter Dean) disapproval of this. Seeking comfort and support, Ian has a heart to heart with his grandmother, Lou Beale (Anna Wing). This scene was important for EastEnders as it was the first instance Julia's Theme was used, which is a rare alternative ending, featured in the serial. ATV Today said in 2010, "We doubt nowadays that such a scene would warrant the theme being used but in the early 1980s, [...] the theme was used more frequently for such occasions."

Ian later went on to feature in a storyline about the ups and downs of a pop group called The Banned in 1986, in which he was drummer. It featured the majority of teenage characters in the soap at the time, including Ian's thought-to-be brother, Simon Wicks (Nick Berry), Ian's best friend, Kelvin Carpenter (Paul J. Medford) and Ian's childhood friend and ex-girlfriend, Sharon Watts (Letitia Dean) and the storyline proved to be a successful merchandising tool for the serial, as it spawned two hit singles in the UK charts. The storyline was seen as an interesting and major undertaking in the serial, but one that Holland and Smith felt never entirely worked.

=== Marriage to Cindy ===
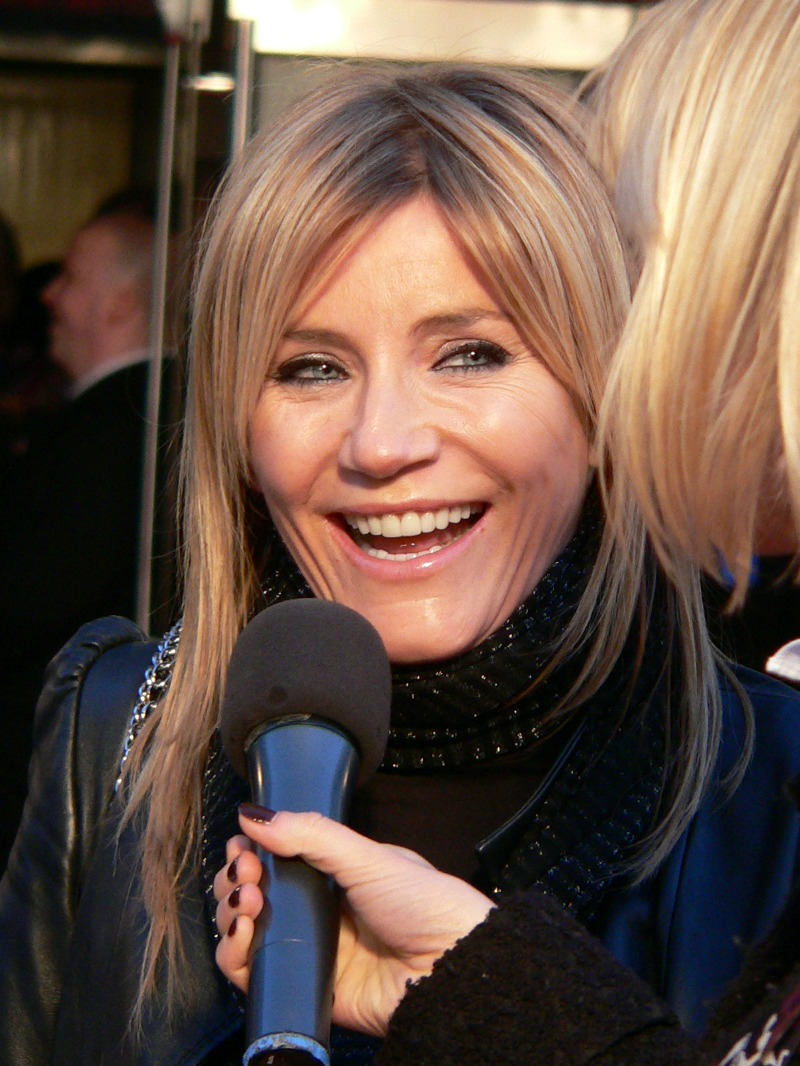
Michelle Collins (pictured) has portrayed Cindy since 1988. Cindy and Ian's relationship has been described as "one of the most tempestuous in any soap opera".

Obsession with success has been an underlying theme with the character for almost the entire duration of the show, but the acceleration of Ian's nasty side can be traced back to his disastrous first marriage to one of EastEnders' most renowned women, Cindy Beale (Michelle Collins), whom he married in 1989. Collins was originally cast as a guest character to be Simon's love interest in 1988 but producers soon paired Cindy with Ian.

One of the two's biggest storylines focused on Ian's discovery that the child he thought was his, Steven (Edward Farrell), was actually fathered by Simon. The climax of this revelation was known to script-writers as the "Devon cottage climax" and aired in September 1990. The episode saw an enraged Ian trace Cindy and Simon to her parents' house in Devon, just after being released from hospital following a suicide attempt. The script, written by Debbie Cook, led to a confrontation that EastEnders' writer, Colin Brake, has suggested contained elements of tragedy and farce. Brake suggests that a particularly memorable scene included Ian furiously throwing bricks through the window of the house, followed by one of his crutches. The episode ended ominously with Ian finding Cindy's father, Tom's shotgun and stealing it. Directed by Matthew Evans, Brake suggests that these episodes not only brought the story to a shocking climax but also laid roots for the next three months' worth of storylines, building up to Cindy and Simon's departure, and Ian's spectacular fall from grace.

Author Dorothy Hobson has described Ian and Cindy's relationship as "one of the most tempestuous in any soap opera". The characters were reunited on-screen in 1992 but the relationship ended in adultery once again when Cindy began an affair with Simon's and Ian's half-brother, David Wicks (Michael French), which culminated in Cindy hiring an assassin to shoot Ian in 1996 after he discovered the affair. Collins commented in 1996, "[Cindy] was not thinking properly when she contacted the hitman, and she is being quite erratic. Despite what she has done she never expected Ian to be so cruel to her. Now she cannot really see any other way out of the mess she is in. She has lost touch with reality – but in the end she can't see any other way of escaping Ian." More than 18 million viewers tuned in to see Ian gunned-down, which was more than sixty-four per cent of available viewers. The plot facilitated Collins' desire to leave the programme following the birth of her child, and Cindy, implicated in the shooting, fled the country with Steven (now played by Stuart Stevens) and her and Ian's son, Peter Beale (Francis Brittin-Snell).

Cindy later returns but departs again in 1998, after being arrested for Ian's shooting. Ian takes back custody of Steven (now played by Edward Savage) and his and Cindy's twins, Peter (now played by Joseph Shade) and Lucy Beale (Casey Anne Rothery). The episodes marking Cindy's exit were screened in a one-hour special on Good Friday (10 April 1998). The episodes were also notable for being the last appearance of Kathy (until her return in 1999). Despite the high-profile exits, the episodes were beaten in the ratings by rival soap, Coronation Street, which garnered 14 million viewers. It had been reported that EastEnders' producers had been hoping to beat the ratings success of Coronation Street's popular "Free Deirdre" storyline, which was about the jailing of Deirdre Barlow (Anne Kirkbride), for a crime she did not commit.

=== Who Shot Phil? ===
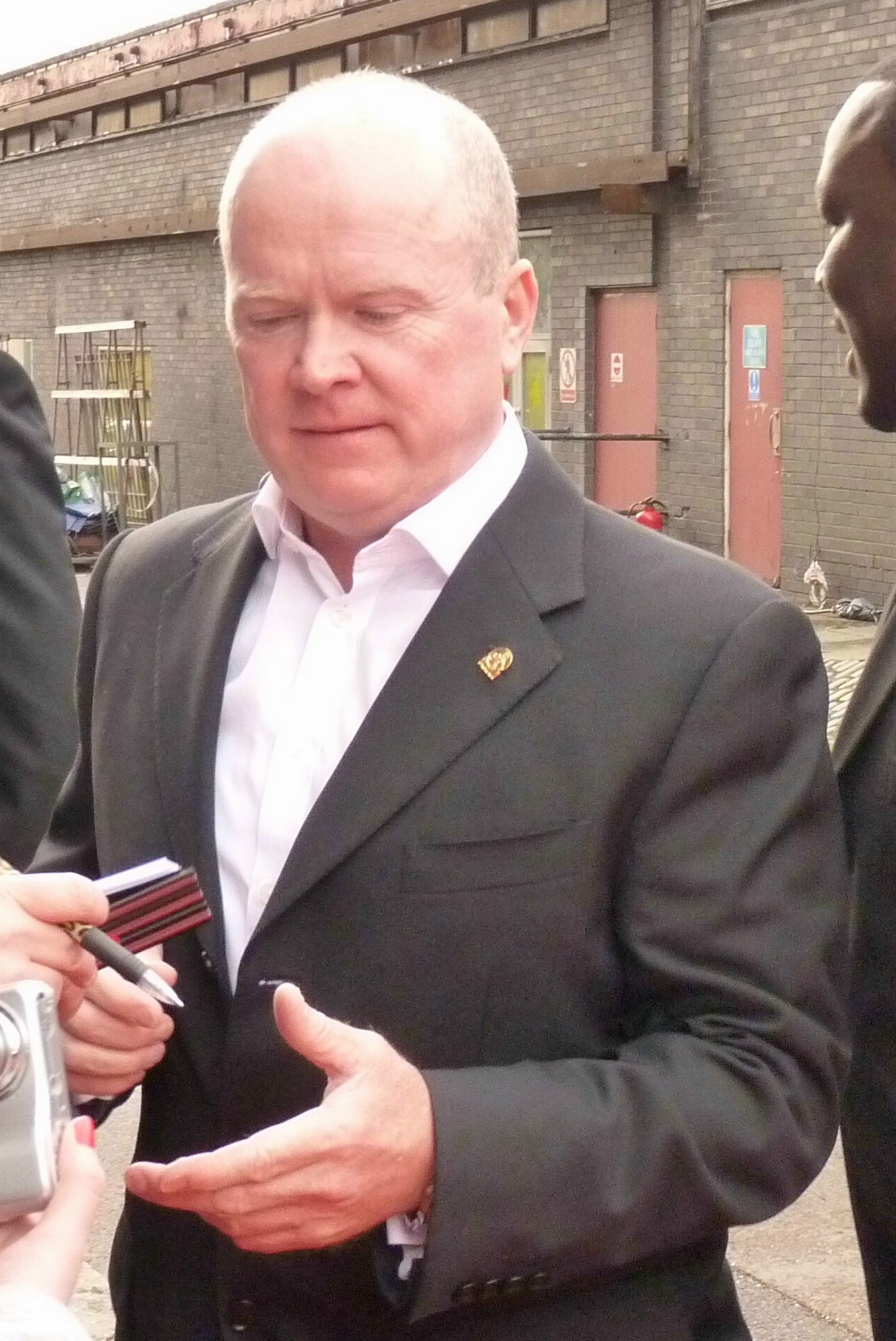
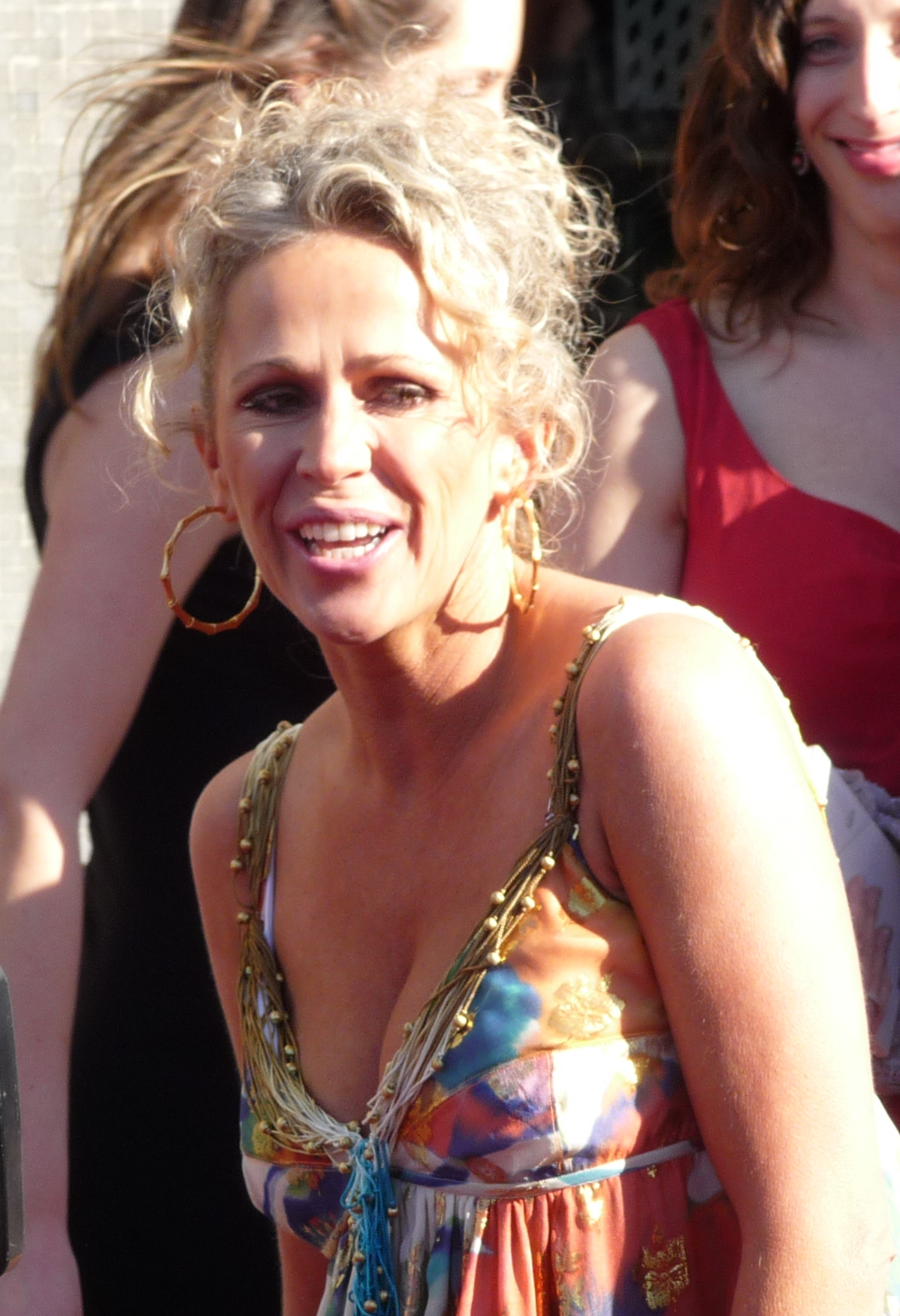
Steve McFadden (left) and Lucy Benjamin (right) portray Phil and Lisa, respectively. Ian was a suspect in Phil's shooting, which Lisa was responsible for.

Ian and Phil Mitchell (Steve McFadden) had a long-standing feud, which began in 1995, when Phil married Kathy. In March 2001, Phil is shot by an unknown assailant, which starts a major whodunnit storyline. Ian was made a prime suspect on the BBC's list of suspects. On this list, it describes Ian as "an entrepreneur turned bankrupt businessman, he has failed in love and business on several occasions." When explaining his motives for the shooting, it says, "He has always hated Phil, who was once married to his mother. Phil refused to bail him out when his business failed." On an official BBC Online poll, 5% of the audience believed that Ian was guilty. William Hill bookmakers revealed that the odds of Ian being guilty were 20–1. It was revealed on in an episode that aired on 5 April 2001 that Phil's ex-girlfriend, Lisa Fowler (Lucy Benjamin), was the culprit. The episode caused the third-largest TV pickup power surge on record and the Liverpool and Barcelona UEFA Cup semi-final was postponed for 15 minutes to accommodate a special 40 minute edition of the soap.

=== Hiatus and reintroduction alongside Cindy ===
In August 2020, it was announced that Woodyatt would be taking an "extended break" from EastEnders. A show insider told Digital Spy that his departure would be "part of a big storyline" and that it is "unclear how long [his break] will be". Ian departed in scenes broadcast on 22 January 2021. In May 2021, Woodyatt made an appearance on The One Show, where he was asked how long his break would last. Woodyatt explained that he is starring in a theatre production until October 2021 and would then be attending his daughter's wedding in America; he did not know a specific date for his character's return, but stated it will be 2022 "at the earliest". In October 2021, he stated that his return will air in mid-2022. However, he made an exception for the on-screen funeral of Dot Cotton in December 2022, following the death of actress June Brown earlier that year.

It was reported on 19 May 2023 that Woodyatt would finally be returning to the show in a storyline accommodating the return of Cindy, who was to make a return after 25 years, resurrecting her character from the dead. It was confirmed by the BBC on 21 June 2023, following the airing of Cindy's return that, Woodyatt would indeed return on a permanent basis later in the summer alongside Collins. A day later, Ian made his onscreen return after a two-and-a-half year hiatus.

== Storylines ==
As a teenager, Ian argues with his father, Pete Beale (Peter Dean), over his desire to become a caterer but his grandmother, Lou Beale (Anna Wing), encourages him. He starts several businesses and buys a local café soon after graduating from catering college. Ian has several failed romances, including with his childhood friend, Sharon Watts (Letitia Dean). Sharon becomes interested in Simon Wicks (Nick Berry), who was believed to be Ian's half-brother, but they remain close friends. When his cousin Michelle Fowler (Susan Tully) falls pregnant, he is initially suspected to be the father by his parents, Pete and Kathy Beale (Gillian Taylforth). He starts a relationship with Tina Hopkins (Eleanor Rhodes) and the pair decide to move in together, renting one of his best friend, Kelvin Carpenter's (Paul J. Medford) father, Tony's (Oscar James) flats. Ian eventually loses his virginity to her, to his glee. Ian and Tina break up when Tina's parents, Keith (Ian Redford) and Mrs Hopkins (Pamela Merrick), make an unannounced visit and are unhappy with their living conditions, so they take Tina to Ilford. Ian's uncle, Kenny Beale (Michael Attwell), and cousin, Elizabeth Beale (Lucy Bayler), visit from New Zealand and Ian and Elizabeth taking a liking to each other, but they break up when Elizabeth constantly flirts with men and she returns home. Ian begins to develop a relationship with Donna Ludlow (Matilda Ziegler), not knowing she is his half-sister until his mother Kathy tells him that she was raped as a teenager and gave Donna up for adoption.

Ian gets engaged to Cindy Williams (Michelle Collins) in 1989; however, a one-night stand with Simon leaves her pregnant. Cindy marries Ian and claims that the baby she is expecting, Steven Beale (Edward Farrell), is his, resulting in Ian attempting suicide when he learns the truth. He recovers and causes Simon to have a car accident in revenge so Simon, Cindy and Steven leave Walford together. Ian immerses himself in his catering business but his exploitative working practices alienate his friends, employees and family. He and Cindy later reconcile and Ian is overjoyed to become a father to twins, Peter (Francis Brittin-Snell) and Lucy Beale (Eva Brittin-Snell) in December 1993. After opening a fish and chip shop, Ian becomes so obsessed with building his business empire that he partially neglects Cindy. This soon leads to Cindy having an affair with his half-brother, David Wicks (Michael French), which continues for over a year up until Ian eventually learns the truth. Ian later breaks up with Cindy and plans to take custody of their children, and so Cindy responds by hiring a hitman named John Valecue (Steve Weston) to kill her husband in October 1996; Ian is shot but is only clipped by the bullet and recovers. Cindy leaves the country with Steven (now played by Stuart Stevens) and Peter (now played by Alex Stevens) and spends a year in Italy before Ian traces them and retrieves the boys. Cindy returns to Walford and wins back custody of the children but is implicated in Ian's shooting. She is later jailed on remand and supposedly – dies several months later in prison in Italy in November 1998 during childbirth.

In 1999, Ian has a serious romance with Mel Healy (Tamzin Outhwaite), the manager of his bric-a-brac shop. She proposes to him but later gets seduced by nightclub owner, Steve Owen (Martin Kemp). Suspecting that she is planning to leave him, Ian deceives Mel by falsely claiming that Lucy (now played by Casey Anne Rothery) is dying from lymphoma. They marry in 1999, but she leaves him during their wedding reception after discovering that he lied about Lucy's condition.

In 2000, Ian pursues a new business venture: development of high-market flats. He begins a casual relationship with his nanny, Laura Dunn (Hannah Waterman), but becomes so obsessed with his business that he neglects her most of the time. They later have sex, but Ian is confronted by his former stepfather, Phil Mitchell (Steve McFadden), over sacking the latter's girlfriend, Lisa Shaw (Lucy Benjamin), earlier on; Phil torments Ian and vows to make him suffer. A few months later, Ian is declared bankrupt after his business collapses and Phil refuses to give him the money that Ian needed to overcome his financial troubles. This could have been a motive for Ian when Phil is later shot on the night that Mel and Steve got married in March 2001. Ian is a suspect but is proven innocent when Lisa is revealed to be the culprit. Ian later admits to Laura that he found Phil after the shooting but left him for dead. When Phil finds out about it, he forces Ian to help testify against his arch-nemesis, Dan Sullivan (Craig Fairbrass), over the shooting.

By then, Ian has begun to commit to Laura and proposes to her after she buys back the fish and chip shop; despite fearing that Ian is only interested in an inheritance she has received, Laura accepts his proposal and they get married in May 2001. Soon their marriage gets into trouble when Ian attempts to kiss Mel and he later refuses to have a child with Laura, who frequently belittles him. Steven (now played by Edward Savage) learns that Ian has been visiting local prostitute, Janine Butcher (Charlie Brooks), and tells Laura, before moving to New Zealand to live with Simon. Laura forgives Ian on the condition that they have a baby. Although he agrees, Ian has a secret vasectomy and throws Laura out when she becomes pregnant later that year after conning her into signing over control of their businesses. A few years later, Laura's son, Bobby Beale (Kevin Curran), requires a blood transfusion shortly after his birth. This causes Laura to realise that Ian must be his father, as her lover, Garry Hobbs (Ricky Groves), is not a match. Laura dies in April 2004, breaking her neck after falling down the stairs. Ian feels guilty for the way he treated Laura and takes custody of Bobby after finding out about the latter's true parentage.

In 2006, Ian's animosity with Phil escalates they are told that Kathy has died in a car crash and that her young son, Ben Mitchell (Charlie Jones), has come to the square; Ben is also Phil's son as well as Ian's half-brother. Ian, who has disliked Phil over his disastrous marriage with Kathy, threatens to start a custody battle for Ben. Soon enough, Ian meets a new romantic interest, Jane Collins (Laurie Brett), in 2004. He helps her to come to terms with the death of her husband, David Collins (Dan Milne), from Huntington's disease, and, although their relationship is severely tested when Jane has embarked on a romantic tryst with Phil's brother, Grant Mitchell (Ross Kemp), they marry in July 2007. Steven (now played by Aaron Sidwell) returns to Walford and stalks Ian, escalating to holding him hostage for several weeks. He accidentally shoots Jane during an altercation, which results in her needing a hysterectomy. Ian forgives Steven but banishes him from his life when he helps Lucy (now played by Melissa Suffield) run away. Ian and Jane temporarily separate over Ian's reluctance to adopt a child. When Lucy falls pregnant, she suggests that Jane raise the baby as her own. Jane and Ian agree but he secretly helps Lucy to have an abortion, lying to Jane that she miscarried. Jane later learns the truth and decides to steal Ian's money and leave him. Ian arranges for her to adopt Bobby (now played by Alex Francis), and is devastated to discover Jane's plans. Although she decides to remain with him, Ian begins a fling with Glenda Mitchell (Glynis Barber); this ends in disaster when she blackmails Ian, thus forcing him to confess the adultery to Jane. A disgusted Peter (now played by Thomas Law) leaves Walford and joins Lucy in Devon. Jane and Ian divorce but continue to live together; however, their acrimony upsets Bobby and Jane leaves Walford in May 2011 as a result. Ian attempts to move on by filling an urn with cigarette ash, pretending that he is a widower and that the ashes are Jane in order to gain attention from women. However, his ruse is soon uncovered.

Feeling dejected, Ian goes to a strip club in August 2011 and is stunned to see Mandy Salter (Nicola Stapleton) being thrown out. Ian helps Mandy out and allows her to stay with him. Mandy helps Ian discover his more frivolous side and he realises he has feelings for her. They begin a relationship, realising that they both yearn for someone to love them, and Mandy accepts Ian's impromptu marriage proposal. Following the death of Pete's first wife, Pat Evans (Pam St Clement), Ian's daughter, Lucy (now played by Hetti Bywater), returns to Walford, angry at Ian for not telling her about Pat's death. She decides to move in with her father and takes a disliking to Mandy. The relationship is marred by Mandy's one-night stand with Ricky Butcher (Sid Owen), Ian's insecurities, interference from Mandy's abusive mother, Lorraine Stevens (Victoria Alcock), and Lucy's hatred of Mandy. Despite Lucy's best efforts to split them up, Ian is determined to marry Mandy and brings their wedding day forward. Mandy is horrified, however, when Ian chooses her over Lucy and throws his daughter out. Realising she does not love Ian, Mandy leaves him in May 2012, leading to Ian suffering a nervous breakdown. He wanders along a road barefoot, dressed only in pyjamas, not telling anyone where he has gone.

Two months later, Lauren Branning (Jacqueline Jossa), working with homeless people, sees Ian at a homeless shelter. Tanya Cross (Jo Joyner), Max Branning (Jake Wood) and Alfie Moon (Shane Richie) find him and bring him back to the Square but Lucy is unsympathetic, angered by his leaving her and Bobby, and slams the door in his face. Ian refuses to acknowledge anyone. He stays with Tanya and Max until Phil finds out he is back and takes him to his house to ensure he does not tell anybody about Ben murdering Heather Trott (Cheryl Fergison). Ian continues to be unresponsive until Phil's partner, Shirley Carter (Linda Henry), mentions Heather, and his memory returns. Ben attempts to help Ian by taking him to the café, but Lucy screams and has him physically removed. Ian, extremely miserable, collapses in tears outside, while Phil worries that Ian will remember that Ben murdered Heather. After Sharon returns to Walford, she successfully persuades Lucy to give Ian another chance. Lucy agrees but on the condition that Ian signs all of his businesses over to her so that if Ian abandons her again she can be financially secure. Ian agrees to this. Ben confesses to murdering Heather and is remanded in custody, leaving Ian shocked. He starts working again at the café and getting back into his old life. Phil then gets Ian to visit Ben in prison to try to get him to retract his confession, but Ian says he cannot tell Ben what is right. Eventually, Zainab Khan (Nina Wadia) persuades Ian to attend counselling in an attempt to recover from his mental breakdown and, after talking to Sharon, Lucy finally makes peace with her father.

Soon enough, Ian becomes close with Denise Fox (Diane Parish) as they initially competed against each other in a fruit-selling war, during which he often irritates her. Denise's sister, Kim Fox (Tameka Empson), attempts to set them up on a date but this upsets Denise, who kisses Kim's boyfriend, Ray Dixon (Charles Venn). Kim discovers this and disowns her sister, so Ian allows Denise to stay with him, igniting a friendship between them. It eventually leads to a relationship when he confides in her about his life on the streets. Ian decides to open a restaurant, though Lucy is worried it will fail because of his mental illness. He runs out of money for construction but then finds a box of cash that used to belong to Derek Branning (Jamie Foreman). He also gets Janine to invest in the restaurant, and eventually tricks Lucy into signing over all of the businesses to him. Peter (now played by Ben Hardy) returns to live with the family, and is soon followed by Cindy Williams (Mimi Keene), the daughter of Ian's dead ex-wife of the same name. Ian lets Cindy stay, and Denise also moves in with the family. However, Carl White (Daniel Coonan), an associate of Derek, arrives in Walford and soon works out that Ian has spent Derek's money. Carl claims the money was his, and so extorts large sums of cash from Ian as payback. Carl is violent, and burns Ian's hand when he tries to refuse to pay him before promising that the debt will be paid if Ian lies in court, and says that he saw Max tampering with the brakes of Carl's car. Ian reluctantly agrees, but on the day of the court case he is kidnapped by Phil, and Max is found not guilty. It is then revealed that Max was in on the kidnapping, but it was just to lure Carl into a trap. Ian then has to face the consequences of his actions, and Denise is angry when she finds out the truth.

Denise thinks that Ian is planning to propose to her as a Christmas present, but he denies it even though he has bought an engagement ring. Peter reveals that he is in a relationship with Lola Pearce (Danielle Harold), the mother of Phil's granddaughter and Ian's half-niece, Lexi Pearce (Dotti-Beau Cotterill). Phil threatens Ian and forces him to end the relationship. Ian tells Peter this, and Peter tells Ian that he has found £10,000 that Cindy stole from Phil. They return the money, and Phil blames Ian, believing that he put Cindy up to stealing it. In January 2014, just as Ian is about to propose to Denise, Jane arrives unannounced. Jane later buys into Ian's restaurant and they begin running it together, leading Ian to harbour feelings for Jane.

Ian is pessimistic when Lucy decides to set up her own property business and later becomes concerned about her when he discovers she is sleeping with Lee Carter (Danny Hatchard) and is taking cocaine. He confronts her and admits she is the child he is most proud of, but this is overheard by Peter, resulting in Lucy storming out. Ian tries to contact her when she does not return home that night, but is later informed by DC Emma Summerhayes (Anna Acton) and DS Cameron Bryant (Glen Wallace) that Lucy has been found dead. He identifies her body and then shares his devastating news with Jane, Denise, Cindy, Bobby (now played by Rory Stroud) and finally Peter. Struggling with their grief, Ian and Jane share a passionate encounter, giving Ian hope that they might reunite. When Jane dashes his hopes, Ian takes his anger out on Bobby and Jane decides it would be best if she take Bobby away for a while. Cindy also leaves the Square to return to Devon with her aunt, Gina Williams (Nicola Cowper). Increasingly alone, Ian leans on Phil for support and questions how he can move on from his daughter's death. With Peter's help, he stages an opening for the new and improved restaurant, but during its opening night, Emma reveals that Lucy's body has been released for burial. Ian leaves early with Peter to see her, but is unable due to his grief. He wants to organise the funeral for as soon as possible but discovers that Max and Lucy were together; Ian angrily attacks Max as he carries Lucy's coffin down the aisle of the church and it is clear that Ian is not coping. Worried, Sharon believes that he is relying on pills to numb the pain of his grief and she and Carol Jackson (Lindsey Coulson) comfort him.

Ian receives texts from Rainie Cross (Tanya Franks) that he hides from Denise. It is later discovered that he paid Rainie for sex on the night that Lucy died, and, knowing that he has given a false alibi to the police, Rainie demands money to fund her drug addiction. When Ian cannot pay Rainie, she comes to Walford and tells Patrick Trueman (Rudolph Walker) what Ian did. Patrick confronts Ian and decides to tell Denise so Ian arranges a surprise trip to see Denise's daughter, Libby Fox (Belinda Owusu), in Oxford, and they leave before Patrick can tell Denise. Patrick suffers a stroke and he is unable to communicate what happened to Denise. Ian meets Rainie at her request but Mick Carter (Danny Dyer) sees them together. When Ian drives away, Rainie approaches Mick who is then arrested and charged for soliciting a prostitute.

Ian tries to convince Denise to put Patrick in a care home, fearful of his secret. However, he eventually agrees that Patrick can live with them. Rainie tells Denise the truth, but before Ian can explain to Denise, Cindy makes a sudden return, already several hours into her labour. Ian delivers her baby daughter, Beth Williams, and agrees that she can live with him. Denise moves out, refusing to forgive Ian for his actions when she discovers that Patrick knew and that Ian was willing to put Patrick in a care home to keep his secret. Concerned for Ian, Sharon and Phil organise for him to visit Michelle in America. Ian returns on Sharon's wedding day to try to stop her marrying Phil. Jane returns with the news that Bobby (now played by Eliot Carrington) is missing—he is found on Walford Common—he wants to return to Walford and Jane agrees. She falls for Ian again and proposes to him at the Christmas Eve carol concert. They plan their wedding for next February.

Ian and Jane get married in the restaurant with their friends and family as witnesses. After Lauren tells Peter that she believes Lucy was murdered by a member of the family, he accuses them of killing Lucy. Jane admits that Bobby accidentally killed Lucy by hitting her over the head with a jewellery box. Though Bobby believed that Lucy was still alive, Jane realised she was dead and covered up her murder by faking a mugging. Ian, Jane and Cindy decide to cover up Lucy's murder however Peter does not agree to do this. Ian, Jane, Bobby and Beth go on holiday for Ian and Jane's honeymoon, and Peter leaves Walford along with Lauren. A few weeks later, Ian and the rest of the Beales return to Walford and reunite Beth with Cindy, but Cindy believes that she is not a capable mother and abandons Beth at the park, but she is picked up by Ian's great half nephew, Liam Butcher (James Forde). Ian and Jane agree to adopt Beth, but Cindy decides she does not want to be in the same house as her baby, so says that if she is not adopted into a different household, she will tell everyone Bobby killed Lucy. After Beth is taken in by her paternal relatives, Ian tells Cindy to leave and not come back. Jane pays Carol to look after Cindy and Ian finds out from Carol after an argument with her. On the day of Cindy's school prom, Ian reveals this to Cindy. After Cindy gets into a car with two strange men, feeling she has no home, a concerned Ian phones the police. After Cindy returns, Ian tries to convince her she is wanted and Liam convinces her to give her family a chance, so she and Ian make up. Ian and Jane are upset to learn about a new lead in the murder investigation but they still plan silence even after Ben is arrested in the hope that he is released. However, when Max is arrested and charged for the murder, Jane begins to contemplate telling the truth when she feels guilty for not being able to help Carol prove Max's innocence. Ian is adamant that Bobby's role in the murder will not be made public and confronts Sharon when she discovers the truth. Max is found guilty and sentenced to 21 years in prison.

Ian puts Bobby in a private school, hoping that it will help with his anger problems. However, to pay for it, Ian decides to sell his restaurant to a supermarket chain, causing the locals to protest. Ian eventually decides not to sell, meaning Bobby must leave the school, even though he is happy there and doing well. Bobby overhears Jane talking about Bobby leaving the school and when she stops him going back to the school, he hits her over the head with his hockey stick three times, leaving her in a critical condition. He tells Ian in the pub that he has killed Jane, just like he killed Lucy, within earshot of everyone in the pub. After Bobby is questioned about the assault, he confesses to the police that he killed Lucy. They are reluctant to reopen the case but Ian is horrified when Bobby says he still has the murder weapon.

Bobby is charged with unlawful killing and denied bail. He is sent to a youth detention centre until his next hearing the following week. Ian then goes to see Jane in hospital, where she tells him she knows about Steven returning and the Beale family is better off without her, ending her and Ian's relationship. Bobby is sentenced to three years custody. A week later, after visiting Bobby in prison and telling him not to appeal his sentence, Ian receives a threatening note from Max, saying that he will never forget what Ian did. Ian worries when Max returns, but Max tells him and Jane that he has forgiven them. Ian is thrilled when Michelle (now played by Jenna Russell) returns. He starts to worry about his health when he has a medical check-up and he is told that his BMI is high. Michelle crashes her car into Ian's fish and chip shop, for which he has no buildings insurance. Max's employer, James Willmott-Brown (William Boyde) eventually purchases the chip shop, despite it arousing Ian's suspicions.

Ian and Jane are devastated to hear that Steven has a brain tumour, but he has been lying about this in a desperate attempt to stay with Lauren. Jane discovers Steven's lie and that Max has not really forgiven them and is secretly planning revenge. In a bid to get rid of Jane, Max forces Steven to kill her. As a result, Steven sets fire to the restaurant, trapping Jane inside. Steven tries to save Jane, but is violently shoved into a table by Max, who leaves Jane to die. However, while Jane is rescued, Steven dies from a liver bleed. Ian, Kathy and Lauren are shocked when they learn that Steven did not really have a brain tumour. After Jane comes out of her coma, Max forces her to leave Walford with Ian, but Willmott-Brown orders Max to ensure that Ian remains in Walford, so Max blackmails Jane into leaving Walford alone. Ian allows Lauren and Louie Beale (Oscar Winehouse) to move back in with him and tells Lauren's sister, Abi Branning (Lorna Fitzgerald), about making Beales into a franchise to pass onto Louie, so Abi tells him that she is pregnant with Steven's baby, but Ian does not take the news well. Later, Lauren warns Ian to watch his back as Max may be out for revenge, and a broken Max visits Ian and says he will kill him and Phil for making him suffer in prison. Ian tries to escape but Max attempts to strangle Ian with fairy lights as Lauren and Louie come home. On Christmas Day, Tanya returns to Walford and reveals to Stacey Fowler (Lacey Turner) and Abi that Jane told her that Max killed Steven, news which Abi relays to Lauren, Kathy and Ian. Ian attacks Max in the street but Max overpowers and punches him.

In February 2020, Ian discovers that Sharon's teenage son, Dennis Rickman Jnr (Bleu Landau), has been bullying Bobby (now played by Clay Milner Russell) for his Islamic faith, which results in Bobby being hospitalised, following an Islamophobic attack. Enraged, Ian confronts Dennis during The Queen Vic boat party and angrily locks him in a cabin following a bitter row. However, when Phil and Keanu's fight leads the boat to crash, Ian instantly goes to rescue Dennis; despite Ian's best efforts, Dennis dies and Ian is left feeling guilty. Dotty Cotton (Milly Zero) knows Ian imprisoned Denny and blackmails Ian, although she changes her mind at the funeral, she tries to persuade Ian to be brave enough to confess.

Ian develops feelings for Sharon and he uses Max's money to buy The Queen Vic for her. However, his feelings are not reciprocated. He steals money from a charity set up by Bobby in order to try and frame Max for fraud. Ian is attacked in The Vic by Phil who was asked to do so after Sharon learns about Ian's role in Dennis's death. Sharon and Kathy rush him to hospital where they learn he has a bleed on his brain. Fearing he is going to die, Ian proposes to Sharon—telling her that she always the one he wanted all his life—who accepts his proposal. Kathy asks Sharon to get the marriage annulled once Ian is better, but she disagrees and vows to be there for Ian. After Phil fails to kill Ian because of Phil saying that Ian will always be family, Sharon mixes lithium into Ian's Christmas pudding to poison him. After that fails, she poisons his many cups of tea. Later, Phil changes his mind and agrees to help Sharon murder Ian and they plan to make it look as if Ian has committed suicide, with Phil buying cocaine for Sharon to mix into his dinner after planning a romantic evening. However, Ian finds out the truth and confronts Sharon about her plan to kill him, just before he is about to eat her poisoned pasta. Sharon reveals she knows about his part in Dennis' death and calls him weak and cowardly. She adds that Ian is a hated man and that he deserves to die. A devastated Ian agrees and starts to eat the poisoned food. Willing to let him die at first, Sharon has a change of heart and makes Ian throw up the food, thereby saving his life. She ends her marriage to him and goes to Phil, telling him if he wants Ian dead so desperately, he will have to kill Ian himself. By the time Phil reaches The Vic, Ian has left the Square. Off-screen, Ian later sends Sharon an annulment and makes her the sole owner of the pub, although Sharon returns the Vic to Mick and Linda Carter (Kellie Bright) a few days later. Nearly two years later, Ian returns to Walford, and is seen hiding in the bushes outside a church, watching Dot Branning's (June Brown) coffin be carried inside on the day of her funeral. He is tearful and utters to himself: "Goodbye Dot. I'll miss you". He then answers a call from his new partner and returns home. He is not seen by any of the other funeral goers.

In June 2023, Kathy's fiancé, Tom "Rocky" Cotton (Brian Conley), asks Bobby to contact Ian as Kathy wants him present at their wedding. It is later revealed that Ian is living in France with Peter (now played again by Law) and has also reunited with his first wife, Cindy, who is now going by the pseudonym "Rose Knight", after faking her death 25 years prior in a witness protection scheme, due to giving information about her criminal inmate, Jackie Ford. Cindy's witness protection officer reveals that Jackie has died and Cindy can resume her former life. Ian decides to return to Walford but Cindy refuses, leading to an argument and Ian suffers a heart attack. He later watches a video that Bobby has sent Peter, which shows Cindy's ex-husband, George Knight (Colin Salmon) is now living in Walford as the landlord of The Queen Vic, with his and Cindy's daughters, Gina (Francesca Henry) and Anna Knight (Molly Rainford). Two months later, Peter returns to Walford after Bobby tells him Kathy is selling the chippy. Cindy and Ian soon follow. Ian tries to convince Cindy to return to France, but she is shocked when she spots George on Anna's 21st birthday. Cindy and Ian rush into the Vic where the residents are shocked to see them. Later, Sharon apologises to Ian for trying to kill him and they make amends. Ian later visits Kathy and Rocky where they are stunned to learn about Cindy's connection to the Knight family. Ian and Cindy decide to stay in Walford and decide to create a pie and mash shop in Walford. After failing to convince Nish Panesar (Navin Chowdhry) to invest in the business, they go into business with Dean Wicks (Matt Di Angelo), and face a public campaign against the business due to Linda's rape allegations against Dean; they are both pleased when Dean is forced to leave the enterprise when he is charged with Keanu Taylor's (Danny Walters) murder. Ian is dismayed when he learns that Cindy kissed George on the tenth anniversary of Lucy's death, but the two reconcile.

In July 2024, Cindy becomes suspicious of Ian's frequent disappearances; she and George follow him to the Cotswolds, convinced he is having an affair; they are followed by Peter and Bobby. Upon arriving, the group are shocked to discover than Ian has been visiting Jane; Ian explains that they were arranging for Jane to reunite with Bobby for his 21st birthday. Ian angrily ends his relationship with Cindy and attempts to reconcile with Jane; however, Jane rejects him and he reconciles with Cindy upon returning to Walford. Unbeknownst to Ian, Cindy begins an affair with George's son, Junior Knight (Micah Balfour). Ian is disappointed when Bobby leaves to join Jane in the Cotswolds in September 2024. In October, Ian is dismayed when David returns to Walford and proposes to Cindy shortly afterwards; the half-brothers reconcile at his engagement party.

In December 2024, Ian suffers an angina attack, but swears Kathy to secrecy, believing it will jeopardise his relationship with Cindy. When Lauren exposes Cindy and Junior's affair on Christmas Day 2024, Ian ends his relationship with Cindy and throws her out of the house, before storming out himself in a rage. After Cindy is attacked shortly afterwards, Ian joins the rest of the Beales and the Knights in the hospital, where he becomes a chief suspect in the attempted murder due to his lack of an alibi. Hoping to evade suspicion, Ian invites Cindy to move back into Number 45, using this as an opportunity to manipulate her into believing one of the Knights attacked her; however, he again evicts her when he learns she is trying to frame Kathy for the attack. Cindy eventually becomes convinced that Ian attacked her when she realises the locket that Ian gifted her had been stolen; she bribes Priya Nandra-Hart (Sophie Khan Levy) to seduce Ian in order to recover the locket from Number 45 to prove this. Ian eventually discovers this and, on the day of the wedding of Billy (Perry Fenwick) and Honey Mitchell (Emma Barton), offers to pay Priya double the amount Cindy has offered to end this; Priya happily agrees. Undeterred, Cindy steals Phil's gun and enters Number 45 herself, where she catches Ian holding the locket; despite this, he continues to deny being the attacker. Kathy soon arrives and confesses to the attack; a fight soon ensues which results in Cindy shooting Ian before fleeing. Ian and Kathy follow Cindy and offer to pay her to keep quiet about Kathy's crime; enraged, Cindy pushes Ian into a car being driven by Reiss Colwell (Jonny Freeman), who swerves out of the way and crashes into the Vic, causing an explosion which destroys the pub and kills Ian's cousin, Martin Fowler (James Bye) and Reiss. In the aftermath of this, a grieving Ian makes an arrangement for Cindy to leave Walford and not report Kathy to the police in exchange for giving her money and remaining silent about her attempts to kill him and her part in the explosion. When Cindy returns, Cindy tries to blackmail Ian for his properties, but fails. Shortly afterwards, Lauren gives birth to her and Peter's second son, Jimmy Beale. However, Ian and his family are later devastated when they learn that Jimmy has coloboma and is severely sight-impaired.

== Reception ==
Ian was voted one of the top five television characters "we most love to hate" in a Channel 4 poll in 2001. In 2009, Ian Beale came ninth in a poll by British men's magazine Loaded for "Top Soap Bloke". Adam Woodyatt has received a number of award nominations for his portrayal of Ian, including a Best Actor nomination at the 2010 British Soap Awards and a nomination for Best Performance in a Serial Drama at the 2012 National Television Awards. In 2013, Woodyatt received the British Soap Award for Lifetime Achievement at the 2013 ceremony. Following thirty years of service to EastEnders, Woodyatt was awarded with his first Best Actor accolade at 2015 British Soap Awards. At this ceremony, he also won Best On-Screen Partnership alongside Laurie Brett.

Author Dorothy Hobson has stated that Ian Beale is a "major creation" capturing the personification of political attitudes taken up during the Conservative government of the 1980s. She suggests that Ian Beale is a "major representation of a young man" of that era, and that his sensitive portrayal by Adam Woodyatt is "perhaps unrecognised". Roz Paterson of the Daily Record branded Ian "eminently unlovable" and stated that Mel Owen (Tamzin Outhwaite) proposing to him represented a growing trend in women proposing. Holy Soap said that Ian's most memorable moment was "His attempted murder in the Square". In 2009, Virgin Media called Ian "the most boring and selfish man in Walford" and felt that he deserved to lose his wife, Jane. In 2014, Tony Stewart from the Daily Mirror called Ian a "spineless little weasel" and "Beale The Squeal" and believed that it was unlikely that Denise Fox (Diane Parish) would go through with her wedding to him. In 2020, Sara Wallis and Ian Hyland from the same website placed Ian ninth on their ranked list of the best EastEnders characters of all time, writing that Ian "has the resilience of a cockroach – and also, some would say, the charm".

== See also ==
- List of EastEnders: E20 characters
- List of soap opera villains
- "Who Killed Lucy Beale?"
- "Who Killed Archie?"
- "Who Shot Phil?"
