= Jack Watson (actor) =

English actor (1915–1999)

- Born: 14 May 1915; Thorney, Cambridgeshire, England
- Died: 4 July 1999 (aged 84); Bath, Somerset, England
- Years active: 1951–1994
- Spouse: Betty Garland (m. 1943)
- Children: 3

Jack Watson (14 May 1915 – 4 July 1999) was an English actor who appeared in many British films and television dramas from the 1950s onwards.

== Early life ==
Watson was born in Thorney, Cambridgeshire. He was the son of a Gaiety Girl, Barbara Hughes, and a music hall comedian, Nosmo King. Watson often appeared on stage with his father as straight man, where he was known simply as Hubert.

== Military service ==
During the Second World War Watson was a physical training instructor in the Royal Navy, and his impressive bearing and powerful physique was much in evidence in many of his subsequent screen roles.

== Career ==
During the war Watson was resident compère of the BBC radio comedy The Navy Mixture. After the war, his talent as an impersonator resulted in his becoming a regular on BBC radio programmes such as Take it from Here, Hancock's Half Hour and The Clitheroe Kid. He gradually made the transition to television, where his first major role was in Coronation Street, in which he became Elsie Tanner's (Pat Phoenix) first lover. Watson appeared in Coronation Street as Bill Gregory on and off between 1961 and 1984; his final episode in 1984 was also the final episode for Pat Phoenix who played his love interest Elsie Tanner in the series. He was one of the villains in the 1966 episode of The Avengers entitled "Silent Dust", chasing Diana Rigg on horseback with a whip. He also appeared as the publican in the 1967 episode of the same series entitled "The Living Dead". He appeared as a powerful but shell-shocked ex-soldier in Dr. Finlay's Casebook, in an episode entitled "Not Qualified" which formed part of the 8th series of the popular British programme. Probably his best-known television role was as Llud, Arthur's craggy sidekick in Arthur of the Britons. Other television roles included appearances in STV's Redgauntlet (1970) and BBC's The Changes (1975), that year also saw a memorable performance as a deceitful head ghillie in an episode of Upstairs Downstairs entitled "Will Ye No Come Back Again". His last major TV role was as the Labour MP James Godbolt in the award-winning Edge of Darkness (1985).

Watson appeared in over 70 films, including: On the Beat (1962) in which he played a police sergeant, Peeping Tom, This Sporting Life, Grand Prix, Tobruk, The McKenzie Break, The Devil's Brigade and The Wild Geese (1978), plus in the Music video of Intaferon - Steam Hammer Sam (published 1983).

== Filmography ==
Year	Title	Role	Notes
1951	Captain Horatio Hornblower	Capt. Sylvester	Uncredited
1960	Peeping Tom	Chief Insp. Gregg	
1960	The Man Who Was Nobody	Police Inspector	
1961	Konga	Supt. Brown	
1961	Fate Takes a Hand	Bulldog	
1961	The Queen's Guards	Sergeant Johnson	
1962	Time to Remember	Insp. Bolam	
1962	On the Beat	Police Sergeant	
1963	Master Spy	Capt. Foster	
1963	Five to One	Insp. Davis	
1963	This Sporting Life	Len Miller	
1964	The Gorgon	Ratoff	
1965	The Hill	Jock McGrath	
1965	Night Caller from Outer Space	Sgt. Hawkins	
1966	The Idol	Police Inspector	
1966	Grand Prix	Jeff Jordan	
1967	Tobruk	Sgt. Maj. Tyne	
1968	The Devil's Brigade	Cpl. Peacock	
1968	The Strange Affair	Quince	
1968	Decline and Fall... of a Birdwatcher	Gallery Warder	
1970	Every Home Should Have One	McLaughlin	
1970	The McKenzie Break	Gen. Kerr	
1971	Kidnapped	James Stewart	
1972	Tower of Evil	Hamp	
1974	From Beyond the Grave	Sir Michael Sinclair	Segment "The Door"
1974	11 Harrowhouse	Miller	
1974	Juggernaut	Chief Engineer Mallicent	
1974	The Four Musketeers	Busigny	
1976	Schizo	William Haskin	
1977	The Purple Taxi	Sean	
1978	The Wild Geese	R.S.M. Sandy Young	
1980	North Sea Hijack	Olafsen	
1980	The Sea Wolves	Maclean	
1982	Tangiers	Donovan	

== Television ==
Year	Title	Role	Notes
1960-1963	The Edgar Wallace Mystery Theater	Various	3 episodes
1961-1966	Armchair Theatre	Various	3 episodes
1961-1962; 1970; 1983-1984	Coronation Street	Bill Gregory	23 episodes
1962	Zero One		Episode: "Fly Away Peter"
1962	Man of the World	Inspector Melton	Episode: "The Mindreader"
1962-1965	No Hiding Place	"Lofty" Rogers/Smithson	2 episodes
1964	Sergeant Cork	Sergeant Jones	Episode: "The Case of the Fourth Visitor"
1964	Festival	Strength	Episode: "Everyman"
1964	Detective	Charlie	Episode: "The Hungry Spider"
1964-1974	Z-Cars	Various	6 episodes
1964-1970	Dr. Finlay's Casebook	Wallace/James Dobbie	2 episodes
1965-1967	The Avengers	Philip Juggins/Hopper	2 episodes
1965-1970	The Wednesday Play	Staff Pierson/Rev. Beaumont	2 episodes
1965-1970	The Troubleshooters	Various	3 episodes
1968	BBC Play of the Month	Captain La Hire	Episode: "St. Joan"
1969-1970	Take Three Girls	Barry Pond	2 episodes
1970	Horizon	Bernard Spilsbury	Episode: "The Expert Witness"
1970-1972	The Main Chance	Charles Arkwright/Harry Selby	3 episodes
1970-1976	Dixon of Dock Green	Various	4 episodes
1971	Justice	Frederick Watson	Episode: "No Flowers, by Request"
1972	Please Sir!	Barker	Episode: "The Price War"
1972	Pretenders	Cornellius	Episode: "Not a Live Thing Left"
1972	Comedy Playhouse	RSM	Episode: "The Dirtiest Soldier in the World"
1972-1973	Arthur of the Britons	Llud	
1973	Some Mothers Do 'Ave 'Em	George	Episode: "The Employment Exchange"
1974-1978	ITV Playhouse	Ken	2 episodes
1975	The Changes	Peter	4 episodes
1975	Churchill's People	Jop	Episode: "The Wallace"
1975	The Hanged Man	Douglas MacKinnon	Episode: "Chariot of Earth"
1975	The Brothers	Jack Cornish	3 episodes
1975	Upstairs, Downstairs	McKay	Episode: "Will Ye No Come Back Again"
1976	The Georgian House	Ellis	Miniseries
1976	Jackanory	Storyteller	Story: "Cart and Cwidder"
1976-1980	The Onedin Line	Dr. Darling/Sir George Goldie	2 episodes
1977	Warship	Walter Perrin	Episode: "A Matter of History"
1977	Mr. Big	Head Porter	Episode: "The Sheiks"
1977	Treasure Island	Billy Bones	2 episodes
1977	Who Pays the Ferryman?	William Hebden	Episode: "Some Talk of Alexander"
1978	Kidnapped	Andie	Episode: "The Prisoner"
1978-1990	All Creatures Great and Small	Various	3 episodes
1980	The Enigma Files	Jack Blandy	Episode: "Investigation of a Copper"
1981	Into the Labyrinth	Davy Crockett	Episode: "Alamo"
1981	Juliet Bravo	Gerald Towne	Episode: "Barriers"
1981	Masada	Decurion	2 episodes
1982	King's Royal	Judge	1 episode
1982	Marco Polo	Old Sailor	Episode 1
1982-1983	West Country Tales	Narrator	Season 2
1984	Diana	Uncle Mark	4 episodes
1985	Christopher Columbus	Father Marchena	Miniseries
1985	Edge of Darkness	James Godbolt	4 episodes
1986	Dempsey and Makepeace	Terence Harris	Episode: "Jericho Scam"
1986	Casualty	DI Potter	3 episodes
1986	Everyman	William Brewster	Episode: "New World"
1987	Miss Marple	Mr. Foster	Episode: "Sleeping Murder"
1990	Little Sir Nicholas	Robinson	Miniseries
1991	Specials	Percy	1 episode
1992	Screen One	Old Man Black	Episode: "Seconds Out"
1994	Minder	Hammer	Episode: "Bring Me the Head of Arthur Daley"
1994	Common As Muck	Vernon	Episode: "The Weekend"
1994	Heartbeat	Tom Abbot	Episode: "A Bird in the Hand"

== Personal life ==
Watson married Betty Garland, a BBC engineer, in 1943 and remained married until his death in 1999. They had two daughters and a son. He lived in Bath, England.

== Death ==
Watson died on 4 July 1999, aged 84, of blood cancer.
