= List of The Main Chance episodes =

This is a list of episodes for the ITV television series The Main Chance.

== Series overview ==
Series	Episodes	Originally released	
Series	Episodes	First released	Last released
1	6	18 June 1969	23 July 1969
2	13	14 September 1970	7 December 1970
3	13	7 June 1972	30 August 1972
4	13	18 April 1975	18 July 1975

== Episodes ==
=== Series 1 (1969) ===
No. overall	No. in series	Title	Directed by	Written by	Original release date
1	1	"What About Justice?"	John Frankau	Edmund Ward	18 June 1969
2	2	"Body and Soul"	Christopher Hodson	Edmund Ward	25 June 1969
3	3	"The Professional"	John Frankau	Edmund Ward	2 July 1969
4	4	"Liar's Dice"	Christopher Hodson	Edmund Ward	9 July 1969
5	5	"The Privilege of Justice"	Christopher Hodson	Edmund Ward	16 July 1969
6	6	"With All My Worldly Goods..."	John Frankau	Edmund Ward	23 July 1969

=== Series 2 (1970) ===
No. overall	No. in series	Title	Directed by	Written by	Original release date
7	1	"A Time to Love, A Time to Die"	Christopher Hodson	Edmund Ward	14 September 1970
8	2	"It Could Happen to You"	Marc Miller	Edmund Ward	21 September 1970
9	3	"First, You Eat - Later We Ruin You"	John Frankau	David Weir	28 September 1970
10	4	"A Little Black and White Lie"	John Frankau	David Weir	5 October 1970
11	5	"The Walls of Jericho"	Christopher Hodson	Louis Marks	12 October 1970
12	6	"A View from the Chair"	Marc Miller	Edmund Ward	19 October 1970
13	7	"The Best Legal System in the World"	John Frankau	John Malcolm	26 October 1970
14	8	"The Piper Calls the Tune"	Christopher Hodson	Louis Marks	2 November 1970
15	9	"A Man I Know to Be Innocent…"	Christopher Hodson	John Malcolm	9 November 1970
16	10	"A Vision of the Future"	Christopher Hodson	Edmund Ward	16 November 1970
17	11	"The Lady Who Went Too Far"	John Frankau	David Weir	23 November 1970
18	12	"Settlement Day"	Christopher Hodson	John Malcolm	30 November 1970
19	13	"Private Armies"	John Frankau	Edmund Ward	7 December 1970

=== Series 3 (1972) ===
No. overall	No. in series	Title	Directed by	Written by	Original release date
20	1	"The Killing Ground"	John Frankau	Edmund Ward	7 June 1972
21	2	"Love's Old Sweet Song"	John Frankau	Edmund Ward	14 June 1972
22	3	"Acting for Self"	Marc Miller	Ray Jenkins	21 June 1972
23	4	"Not in Today's Army"	Marc Miller	John Batt	28 June 1972
24	5	"Widow's Mite"	John Frankau	John Batt	5 July 1972
25	6	"The Next Great Train Robbery"	Marc Miller	Ray Jenkins	12 July 1972
26	7	"Where Did I Leave My Shining Armour?"	Marc Miller	Edmund Ward	19 July 1972
27	8	"Copper-Bottomed Cert"	Marc Miller	David Lees	26 July 1972
28	9	"Doll on a Wall"	John Frankau	Ray Jenkins	2 August 1972
29	10	"Choice of Jungles"	Marc Miller	Edmund Ward	9 August 1972
30	11	"Fit-Up"	John Frankau	Ray Jenkins	16 August 1972
31	12	"One for the House"	John Frankau	John Batt	23 August 1972
32	13	"Dear Sir, Unless…"	John Frankau	Edmund Ward	30 August 1972

=== Series 4 (1975) ===
No. overall	No. in series	Title	Directed by	Written by	Original release date
33	1	"Process"	Derek Bennett	Edmund Ward	18 April 1975
34	2	"World of Silence"	Derek Bennett	Edmund Ward	25 April 1975
35	3	"Rule of Law"	Gareth Davies	John Batt	2 May 1975
36	4	"Payment by Result"	Derek Bennett	Edmund Ward	9 May 1975
37	5	"Survival"	Cyril Coke	John Batt	16 May 1975
38	6	"No Names"	Tony Wharmby	Ray Jenkins	23 May 1975
39	7	"It Couldn't Happen Here"	Tony Wharmby	Edmund Ward	30 May 1975
40	8	"Killing"	Cyril Coke	Ray Jenkins	6 June 1975
41	9	"By the Book"	Cyril Coke	Edmund Ward	20 June 1975
42	10	"When There's No Law"	Michael Ferguson	John Batt	27 June 1975
43	11	"Year of the Tiger"	Michael Ferguson	Ray Jenkins	4 July 1975
44	12	"We're the Bosses Now"	Derek Bennett	John Batt	11 July 1975
45	13	"Coroner's Verdict"	Bob Hird	Edmund Ward	18 July 1975
