= Turtle's Progress =

British TV drama series (1979–1980)

- DVD cover
- Created by: Edmund Ward
- Starring: John F. Landry; Michael Attwell; Paul Shane
- Country of origin: United Kingdom
- Original language: English
- No. of series: 2
- No. of episodes: 13

Production
- Producers: Joan Brown; Nicholas Palmer
- Running time: 60 minutes

Original release
- Network: ATV (ITV)
- Release: 23 April 1979 – 4 July 1980

Turtle's Progress is a British television series, created by Edmund Ward and broadcast between 23 April 1979 and 4 July 1980. The offbeat humour of the show attracted a small but cult audience, and the show ran for two series. The theme music was written and sung by Alan Price.

== Background ==
The characters of Turtle and Razor Eddie had first appeared in 1975 in The Hanged Man, also created by Edmund Ward.

In early 2011, the entire series was released on DVD by Network on Air.

== Plot ==
The series was an ITV ATV Drama and dealt with a petty criminal named Turtle and his minder, "Razor" Eddie, who by accident come into possession of the proceeds of a major bank robbery. Eddie had been told to steal a van, and the van he stole turned out to be the getaway vehicle for the robbery. Inside were a large number of safe deposit boxes. Each episode of the show dealt with Turtle and Eddie opening one box and dealing with its contents. Part of the humour came from the interplay between Turtle and Superintendent Rafferty, who knew they did the crime, had no evidence on which to act, but lurked about in hope of a break.

== Cast ==
- John F. Landry – Turtle
- Michael Attwell – Razor Eddie Malone
- Ruby Head – Aunt Ethel Wagstaff
- Tony London – George Wagstaff
- Terry Kinsella - Jason
- James Grout –Superintendent Rafferty (Series 1 only)
- David Swift – Superintendent Rafferty (Series 2 only)
- Tony Melody – Colour Sergeant Arnold
- Leueen Willoughby – Miss Anthea Goodliffe
- Paul Shane - Mashcan
