= John Landry (actor) =

British actor

John Francois Landry
- Born: John Francois Landry; Nairobi, Kenya

John Francois Landry is a British character actor born in Nairobi, Kenya.

Landry is best known for roles in Coronation Street, Public Eye, The Avengers, The Sandbaggers, and Minder.

His sole television starring role is as Turtle in the comedy series, Turtle's Progress, which was a spin-off from the drama series "The Hanged Man", both created by writer Edmund Ward.
