= Understudy (disambiguation) =

An understudy is an actor learning a role in case the main actor is indisposed.

Understudy or The Understudy may also refer to:

== Literature ==
- The Understudy (novel), a 2005 novel by David Nicholls
- The Understudy, a 1975 novel by Elia Kazan
- The Understudy, a 2007 play by Theresa Rebeck

== Film ==
- The Understudy (1922 film), an American film directed by William A. Seiter
- The Understudy (1976 film), an Australian television film directed by Eric Luithle
- The Understudy: Graveyard Shift II, a 1988 Canadian horror film directed by Jerry Ciccoritti
- The Understudy (2008 film), a British comedy directed by David Conolly and Hannah Davis

== Television episodes ==
- "The Understudy" (Inside No. 9)
- "Understudy" (Mutant X)
- "The Understudy" (Seinfeld)
- "Understudy" (Smash)
- "The Understudy" (Upstairs, Downstairs)
