= Francis, Day & Hunter Ltd. =

British music publishing company

Francis, Day & Hunter
- Industry: Music publishing
- Predecessor: W. & J. Francis and Day
- Founded: 1877; 149 years ago
- Founder: William Francis; James Francis; David Day; Harry Hunter
- Defunct: 1972; 54 years ago
- Fate: Merged into EMI Music Publishing Ltd.
- Successor: EMI Music Publishing
- Headquarters: London, United Kingdom
- Key people: William and James Francis; Harry Hunter; David and Fred Day
- Products: Sheet music; lyrics booklets; records
- Parent: Affiliated Music Publishers Limited

Francis, Day & Hunter is a British music publishing company, one of the leading publishers of music hall songs and popular music in the late-nineteenth and twentieth centuries. It was established in London in 1877 as W. & J. Francis and Day, later Francis Brothers & Day, becoming Francis, Day & Hunter, with the addition of Harry Hunter (1841-1906), in 1880. It became a subsidiary of EMI Publishing in 1972.

== History ==
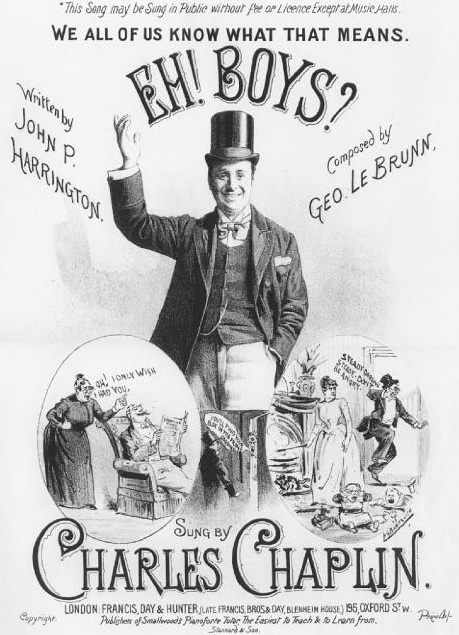
Sheet music for the music hall performer Charles Chaplin Sr. published in London by Francis, Day & Hunter Ltd. c. 1890.

From 1873, the brothers William and James Francis, who worked for the piano manufacturers and music publishers Chappell & Co., were members of leading London music hall ensemble the Mohawk Minstrels. Harry Hunter (1840–1906), the lead performer and lyricist with rival group the Manhattan Minstrels, joined the Mohawks in 1874. The Francis brothers began printing booklets setting out the words of their songs, to encourage audiences to join in with the choruses. In 1877, together with David Day (1850–1929), who had worked for another publishing company, Hopwood and Crew, they set up their own company to publish their songs, including those written by Hunter and others. In 1880, Hunter became a named partner in the business.

Originally based in Oxford Street, the company moved to 138-140 Charing Cross Road in 1897, becoming one of the founding businesses of London's "Tin Pan Alley". David Day formed the Musical Copyright Association in 1900 to protect publishers against sheet music piracy. His son Frederick Day (1878–1975) was acknowledged as one of the driving forces behind the 1911 Copyright Act, which protected the rights of authors and composers.

Under the leadership of David Day and later Fred Day, the company expanded rapidly through the first half of the 20th century, becoming one of the leading British music publishers and one of the largest in the world, responsible for publishing the works of many Broadway composers including Jerome Kern, George Gershwin, and Cole Porter. The company opened offices in New York City, Paris and Berlin. In 1908, Francis, Day & Hunter bought a one-third share in the leading New York music publishing company T.B. Harms, but sold their share in the business in 1920. The firm purchased B. Feldman & Co., one of its main competitors, in 1945.

From 1946 until well into the 1960s the company established a recorded music library of mood music for use in television and radio broadcasts. During that period it supplied themes for (among others) The Adventures of PC 49 (Ronald Hanmer, 'Changing Moods'), Blue Peter (Ashworth Hope, 'Barnacle Bill'), and Independent Television News (John Malcolm, 'Non Stop').

Francis Day & Hunter was merged into EMI Music Publishing Ltd. in 1972.

The David Day Memorial Scholarship was set up at the Royal Central School of Speech & Drama in London, in memory of the company's co-founder.
