= Grady (British TV series) =

1970 British TV drama series

Grady is a three-episode British drama television series that aired in 1970. It was written by Edmund Ward and produced by Marc Miller for Yorkshire Television. The series stars Anthony Bate in the title role as a trade-union negotiator in a northern factory.

Halliwell's Television Companion praised the star and the script: "Anthony Bate rides into town like an old-time gunfighter as a modern hero of labour, a shop-floor loner interested only in a bigger share of loot for the workers, contemptuous of all ideologues. One of television's more successful attempts to wrest drama from the industrial 1970s, and certainly the first to imbue it with the values of the Wild West of the 1870s."

Despite the wiping that was common among British broadcasters during the 1970s, the series still exists in the archives.

== Bibliography ==
- Halliwell, Leslie; with Philip Purser, 1985. Halliwell's Television Companion, 3rd edition. London, Paladin Books. ISBN 0-586-08540-8
