= Bert Feldman =

Bertram Feldman (29 September 1874 – 25 March 1945) was a British music publisher whose innovations "forged the foundations of a commercial music industry in Britain".

== Biography ==
Feldman was born in Hull, the son of a piano maker and music shop owner. In 1895, he went to London and set up in business as a song plugger, the first in the country, buying new songs cheaply from their writers and then aggressively promoting their sheet music sales.

His business expanded when he began acquiring the publishing rights to American songs, particularly after visiting New York City in 1907. The songs he purchased included "Alexander's Ragtime Band", "Down at the Old Bull and Bush", "Teddy Bears' Picnic", and (for 5 shillings) "It's a Long Way to Tipperary", all of which became very popular in Britain. Feldman helped establish Irving Berlin's international reputation, by featuring his songs in his annual song books.

Around 1909, Feldman established his own publishing company in what became known as Feldman's Arcade in Blackpool, later moving it to London. His business continued to expand until his death, his later successes including "The White Cliffs of Dover".

He died in Blackpool in 1945. His business was sold after his death to the publishing firm of Francis Day & Hunter.
