= Michael Attwell =

English actor (1943–2006)

- As Kenny Beale in EastEnders
- Born: Michael John Attwell; 16 January 1943; Watford, Hertfordshire, England
- Died: 18 March 2006 (aged 63); London, England
- Years active: 1968–2006
- Children: 3

Michael John Attwell (16 January 1943 – 18 March 2006) was an English film and television actor. He is possibly best known for his role as Kenny Beale in the television soap opera EastEnders.

== Career ==
Michael Attwell was born in Watford, Hertfordshire, on 16 January 1943.

After training at RADA (studying Stage Management), Attwell went into repertory theatre at Newcastle Playhouse. Among his theatrical appearances include playing Pharaoh in Joseph and the Amazing Technicolour Dreamcoat and Sky Masterson in Guys and Dolls (both at Haymarket Theatre).

In 1979 and 1980, he played Razor Eddie a.k.a. Edward Winston Malone in two series of the comedy-drama Turtle's Progress. The character had originally been created for the ITV drama serial The Hanged Man, where he was played by Gareth Hunt.

In 1978, he played Bill Sikes in the revival of Lionel Bart's musical Oliver! at the Albery Theatre and in 1985 he played Bill Sikes again in the BBC's Sunday afternoon classic serial Oliver Twist.

His other TV credits include: Doctor Who (in the serials The Ice Warriors and Attack of the Cybermen), The First Churchills, Only Fools and Horses, Minder, Bergerac, C.A.T.S. Eyes, Wycliffe, Inspector Morse, Bugs, Silent Witness, Pie in the Sky, Casualty, The Bill, Hotel Babylon, and Are You Being Served?.

He appeared in the 1988 film Buster, based on the life of the Great Train Robber Buster Edwards.

To supplement his theatre income, Attwell produced cartoon strips for IPC and DC Thomson comics including Bunty, Buster, Whizzer and Chips and The Hotspur. As well as acting, between 1981 and 1993 Attwell also had a considerable career as a political cartoonist for several British national newspapers including The Sun, The Sunday People and the News of the World. A self-taught artist, Attwell signed himself as Zoke, an amalgam of the names of his children Zoe and Jake.

In 2002 he played Kenneth in the West End run of Debbie Isitt's The Woman Who Cooked Her Husband at The Ambassadors Theatre.

== Death ==
Attwell died in London on the 18 March 2006 aged 63 from complications following heart surgery. His life and work was honoured at the British Academy Television Awards in 2006.

== Filmography ==
=== Film ===
Year	Title	Role	Notes
1986	Labyrinth	Goblin	Voice
1988	Buster	Harry	
1994	Tom & Viv	W.I. Janes	
2000	Circus	Magnus	
2000	New Year's Day	Sergeant Bristow	
2001	High Heels and Low Lifes	Duty Sergeant	Credited as Mike Attwell
2001	Bodywork	David Leer	

=== Television ===
Year	Title	Role	Notes
1968	Coronation Street	Keith	4 episodes
1968	The Root of All Evil?	Ron	Episode: "You Can Only Buy Once"
1969	The First Churchills	Henry St. John	3 episodes
1979–1980	Turtle's Progress	Razor Eddie Malone	13 episodes
1981	Seconds Out	Julian	Episode: "Round 8"
1982	The Chinese Detective	Harry Foss	Episode: "Bounty Hunter"
1982	Only Fools and Horses	Englishman	Episode: "It Never Rains..."
1983	Bloomfield	Bruce Bruton	Episode: "The Art of Finding Edina"
1983	Bergerac	Frank	Episode: "Almost Like a Holiday"
1983	Paul Squire Esq.	Unknown	Episode: #1.6
1983	Jemima Shore Investigates	Dennis Jones	Episode: "Death à la Carte"
1984	Minder	Harry	Episode: "A Number of Old Wives Tales"
1967–1985	Doctor Who	Ice Warrior Bates	6 episodes
1985	Up the Elephant and Round the Castle	Tonka	Episode: "Wakey Wakey"
1985	Hilary	Sam Chance	Episode: #1.4
1985	Are You Being Served?	Burglar	Episode: "The Hold-Up"
1985	Roll Over Beethoven	PC Crosby	Episode: #1.11
1985	Oliver Twist	Bill Sikes	9 episodes
1986	King and Castle	Stimson	Episode: "Rivals"
1987	C.A.T.S. Eyes	Jack Lee	Episode: "Country Weekend"
1987	Never Say Die	Mr. Danvers	3 episodes
1987	Gentry	Slatter	Television film
1988	EastEnders	Kenny	9 episodes
1988	The Tenth Man	Krogh	Television film
1989	Crossbow	Headhunters' Leader	Episode: "Headhunters"
1990	Inspector Morse	Parsons	Episode: "The Infernal Serpent"
1990	The New Adventures of Black Beauty	Barrett	2 episodes
1990	The Paradise Club	Johnny Ivory	Episode: "The Rotherhithe Project"
1991	ScreenPlay	Oliver Rowntree	Episode: "Redemption"
1991	Singles	Jeff	Episode: "Flash Back"
1989–1991	Boon	Arthur Mitchell John Milne	2 episodes
1993	Then Churchill Said to Me	Pvt. Norman Pain	6 episodes
1993	Westbeach	Ray Cromer	8 episodes
1993	London's Burning	Phil	2 episodes
1993	Scarlet and Black	Monsieur Valenod	2 episodes
1993	Horse Opera	Johnson	Television film
1994	Red Eagle	Bazarov (as Mike Attwell)	Television film
1994	Anna Lee	Charlie McKinnon Robert Thurman	Episode: "Stalker"
1995	Harry	Roger	Episode: "Over the Hills"
1995	Bugs	Alan Moore	Episode: "Out of the Hive"
1995	Joseph	Judah (as Mike Attwell)	2 episodes
1996	Poldark	George Warleggan	Television film
1996	Thief Takers	Assistant Commissioner Weldon	2 episodes
1997	Silent Witness	Josef Quayle	2 episodes
1997	Screen One	Kuzmenko	Episode: "Hostile Waters"
1997	Pie in the Sky	Michael	Episode: "In the Smoke"
1991–1997	Casualty	David Reed Sam Jones	2 episodes
1997–1998	Wycliffe	DCC Stevens	10 episodes
1999	The Colour of Justice	William James Melish	Television film
2000	Monsignor Renard	M. Dufosse	3 episodes
2000	Border Cafe	Edwardian Clive	8 episodes
2000	Hope and Glory	Geoff Wilson	Episode: #3.2
2001	My Family	Mr. Smith	Episode: "Get Cartier"
1989–2002	The Bill	Various	4 episodes
2002	Daniel Deronda	Rev. Gascoigne	2 episodes
2003	Dinotopia	Hugo	2 episodes
2003	Seven Wonders of the Industrial World	William Hope	Episode: "The Great Ship"
2004	The Last Detective	Billy Clemens	Episode: "The Long Bank Holiday"
2004	Doc Martin	Alan Gibson	Episode: "Of All the Harbours in All the Towns"
2004	Trial & Retribution	Brian the Bouncer	2 episodes
2004	Heartbeat	Bob Acott	Episode: "Buried Secrets"
2006	Missing	Mr. Greenside	Television series
2006	Hotel Babylon	Derek Crisp	6 episodes
2006	Agatha Christie's Marple	Archie Stone	Episode: "The Sittaford Mystery"
