= Joke Over =

- Upstairs, Downstairs episode
- Episode no.: Season 5 Episode 13
- Directed by: Bill Bain
- Written by: Rosemary Anne Sisson
- Production code: 11
- Original air date: 30 November 1975

Episode chronology
| ← Previous "Will Ye No Come Back Again" | Next → "Noblesse Oblige" |

"Joke Over" is the thirteenth episode of the fifth and final series of the period drama Upstairs, Downstairs. It first aired on 30 November 1975 on ITV.

== Background ==
Joke Over was recorded in the studio on 29 and 30 May 1975. The location footage was filmed near Middle Wallop in Andover, Hampshire on 21 May 1975. The scavenger hunt plotline was inspired by the autobiography of Barbara Cartland, We Danced All Night. This had also been used by Rosemary Anne Sisson in the earlier episode Laugh a Little Louder Please. In Joke Over, Madeleine Cannon makes her final appearance as Lady Dolly Hale.

== Plot ==
It is summer 1928, and Lord and Lady Bellamy are at Southwold in Wiltshire, so Georgina has the house to herself. She returns late at night with friends Lady Dolly, Peter Dinmont, Ethel, Darrow Morton and Lord Stockbridge after a scavenger hunt. The final item for the scavenger hunt is a maid's cap, which they fetch from the servants' quarters, waking Hudson in the process. Lady Dolly soon goes upstairs, to take cocaine. To finish the scavenger hunt the party need to drive down to Sussex, but as Lady Dolly's car has a puncture, they go to the garage and insist on taking Lord Bellamy's car. Edward tries say that he should drive, but Georgina refuses to let him.

Early in the morning, Georgina is driving the car on a quiet road in Sussex when a cyclist, Mr Smith, suddenly comes out in front of her. Despite braking, the car knocks the man over. Back in London, Lord and Lady Bellamy return. Sir Geoffrey Dillon arrives and informs them that Mr Smith has died. Richard blames Edward for allowing Georgina to drive. Lord Stockbridge's father, the Duke of Buckminster, forbids Robert, who was travelling in a separate car behind Georgina, from attending the inquest, and the solicitors have arranged to say that he was not there. At the inquest, Darrow, Peter and Ethel do not turn up, and Lady Dolly's testimony does more to harm Georgina's case than help. At the last minute, Lord Stockbridge turns up and insists on giving evidence. He tells the inquest how Georgina was only driving at 30 mph and says she could not have done anything to avoid running over Mr Smith. The verdict is given as "accidental death" but Georgina is rebuked for "irresponsible behaviour".

Meanwhile, Edward is annoyed at being blamed for the car being taken, and tells Daisy he will resign. However, Richard soon speaks to him and apologises, saying Georgina had told him what happened. Georgina tells Lord Stockbridge after the inquest that she never wants to see Lady Dolly again and they then go together to the Savoy Grill for lunch.

== Cast ==
- Lesley-Anne Down - Georgina Worsley
- Gordon Jackson - Hudson
- David Langton - Richard Bellamy
- Hannah Gordon - Virginia Bellamy
- Angela Baddeley - Mrs Bridges
- Raymond Huntley - Sir Geoffrey Dillon
- Christopher Beeny - Edward
- Nigel Havers - Peter Dinmont
- Patsy Blower - Ethel
- Madeline Cannon - Lady Dolly Hale
- Terence Bayler - Darrow Morton
- Anthony Andrews - Robert, Marquis of Stockbridge
- Jacqueline Tong - Daisy
- Barry Stanton - PC Burridge
- Bernard Barnsley - Mr Smith
- Jenny Tomasin - Ruby
- Robert Hartley - Coroner
- Daphne Lawson - Mrs Smith
- Kenneth Thornett - Foreman of the Jury
- Sue Crossland - Double for Lesley-Anne Down
