= Tracey (EastEnders) =

Fictional character from EastEnders

- EastEnders character
- Portrayed by: Jane Slaughter
- Duration: 1985–present
- First appearance: Episode 1 "Poor Old Reg"; 19 February 1985
- Created by: Tony Holland
- Introduced by: Julia Smith
- Spin-off appearances: Dimensions in Time (1993); Pudding Lane (1999); The Big Albert Square Dance (2013); The Ghosts of Ian Beale (2014); Once Upon a Time in Albert Square (2018); Tracey: A Day in the Life (2024)
In-universe information
- Occupation: Market trader Businesswoman; Barmaid; Cleaner; Cashier
- Sons: Tom

Tracey is a fictional character from the BBC soap opera EastEnders, played by Jane Slaughter. Tracey has appeared as a significant extra in the serial since the first episode, which was broadcast on 19 February 1985, when she was seen working on the flower stall in Bridge Street Market but moved on to becoming a barmaid at The Queen Vic pub in 1989. Slaughter was not credited in the role until 1 May 1986, which was the first episode in which she spoke. Tracey is the longest-serving EastEnders character, as the other three remaining original characters, Ian Beale (Adam Woodyatt), Kathy Beale (Gillian Taylforth) and Sharon Watts (Letitia Dean) have all taken extended breaks from the soap in the past, while Tracey has been consistent.

Tracey's storylines have included brief sexual encounters with other EastEnders characters, consisting of Dennis Rickman (Nigel Harman), Phil Mitchell (Steve McFadden), Ian, and fellow extra Winston (Ulric Browne), friendships with Debbie Bates (Nicola Duffett), Peggy Mitchell (Barbara Windsor), Sean Slater (Robert Kazinsky), Shirley (Linda Henry) and Linda Carter (Kellie Bright), and Kathy, and is the godmother of Debbie's daughter, Clare Bates (Gemma Bissix). She has also worked multiple different jobs including being a florist on the market, a barmaid and cleaner in The Queen Vic and at The Albert, and a caterer in Ian's chip shop. She has been sacked from The Queen Vic three times, by Roxy Mitchell (Rita Simons), Linda and Woody Woodward (Lee Ryan).

== Development ==
In May 2009, Digital Spy asked EastEnders executive producer Diederick Santer what was in store for Tracey. He said, "You just have to watch out for any script that Christopher Reason writes. Chris is obsessed with Tracey and with Jane Slaughter, who plays her. He gives her loads to do, which is fantastic. When we give her more to do, she absolutely delivers. We think she's fab."

Tracey is the longest-serving character in the serial, as other original cast members who are still in the cast now, have taken long-term breaks from the show. Being one of the only remaining original cast members in the show, Slaughter said, in 2010, that when she joined the show "she recognised that EastEnders could run and be something very exciting" and that she "never dreamed [that it would last] 25 years" but she "certainly knew it was special." When asked to pick her favourite storyline she said, "In terms of actually watching and seeing scenes, I've been lucky being in The Vic. I've seen so many good ones – with the Mitchells, with Phil, with Peggy – I've been very, very lucky to see so many, that it's nigh on impossible to single any out. They've all involved different people – I could go on and on and on!" Slaughter noted that "She's always there whereas other cast members such as Adam [Woodyatt] – who's been there as long as I have – wouldn't necessarily have a storyline that puts him in The Vic at all." She also added, "For me as a character, it has to be Tracey speaking to Sean Slater. It was hysterical. For someone who never says anything, she suddenly had an opinion about everything, which I just loved. It was written by Christopher Reason and done so well. To get someone who only occasionally says things like 'out the back' and make what she says make sense – he did a fantastic job. That was very memorable because everyone was so supportive."

Slaughter teased the possibility that we might see more of Tracey's family. She said, "Good lord - you know I don't know. I would never say never because anything's possible there. They seem to be able to weave all sorts of things in. Whether there would be a demand for it or enough interest I don't know." When Slaughter reads a script and finds a line for Tracey, no matter the length of it, she gets an "incredible buzz". Slaughter said to Inside Soap, in 2015, about her role, "Everything they do regarding Tracey makes perfect sense to me. I am not a main character and don't have the storylines, but they get it right. I have utter faith in what they do."

Slaughter described her character as "lovely", "clever", "loyal but strong" and "opinionated". She also thinks "it would be wrong to suddenly make her into this talkative, all-singing, all-dancing person with a fully-fledged family and surname" and "it wouldn't make sense." Jane Simon from the Daily Mirror described her as "silent".

Tracey was one of the 'outsiders' in the 'Who Killed Archie?' storyline, with many viewers thinking the culprit could be her. In a poll run by Digital Spy, 7.9% of voters thought that Tracey had killed Archie Mitchell (Larry Lamb), and in a second poll, 7.1% thought that it was her. When asked if she thought Tracey could kill, she said, "I wouldn't think she's that dark but who knows – she could be. I've heard there are odds at the bookies to be had for her but why? Why would she have killed him? Because he's threatening The Vic? Is it The Vic she protects or the family?" It was later revealed that bookmakers, William Hill had slashed the odds on Tracey being the killer, with 7/1 thinking she killed Archie. The killer was later revealed to be Stacey Slater (Lacey Turner).

In December 2024, the BBC released a five-part spin-off miniseries, starring Tracey, as part of a BBC Studios Drama Productions scheme, called 'Tracey: A Day in the Life'. This offered the EastEnders Multi-Camera Course, allowing trainee directors to get first-hand experience in directing a continuing drama, from planning to shooting. Slaughter said it "was a fantastic experience to work on this project and to work with such talented directors, actors and crew - the collaborative experience was second-to-none" and "was delighted to be a part of it." The executive producer of EastEnders at the time, Chris Clenshaw, added "EastEnders has a rich history of championing new creative voices and the show often provides writers, directors and actors with their first credit. We’re really excited to be working with such exciting talent as the show prepares to celebrate its milestone 40th anniversary." The miniseries also had three guest appearances from three EastEnders regulars. These were from Linda Carter (Kellie Bright), Elaine Peacock (Harriet Thorpe) and Ian Beale (Adam Woodyatt).

== Storylines ==
In May 1993, Sharon Mitchell (Letitia Dean) tells Nigel Bates (Paul Bradley) that she will be late for his birthday party as she will be attending Tracey's hen party. After Nigel meets and kisses Debbie Tyler (Nicola Duffett) during his birthday party, he asks Tracey where Debbie is. She replies that she left in a cab.

In May 2003, Tracey has a one-night stand with Dennis Rickman (Nigel Harman), the adoptive half-brother of Sharon, when he arrives in Albert Square, despite the fact that she is married. The next day, he returns her underwear to her publicly over The Queen Vic bar, where she works. In August 2005, Sam Mitchell (Kim Medcalf) breaks into The Queen Vic pub with a crowbar, and Tracey discovers her, asking her to leave. Sam knocks Tracey out with the crowbar and drags her, unconscious, into the bathroom, locking her in. Sam goes downstairs to unearth the body of Den Watts (Leslie Grantham), who is buried in the basement, and when the police arrive, Tracey is comforted by Little Mo Mitchell (Kacey Ainsworth). After Sam is released from prison on bail, she apologises to Tracey, but Tracey appears shaken by the ordeal and scared of Sam.

In August 2008, Tracey opens up when Sean Slater (Robert Kazinsky) questions why she is so quiet. She says she wants to keep herself to herself because she thinks that the Mitchells are all "stark raving mad" and that she does not fear any new barmaids, as she has seen them come and go, but knows that she will always be behind the bar. She goes on to say that whoever lives in the pub is 'cursed' in her opinion, and that they will never be able to live happily together. In September 2009, Sam (now played by Danniella Westbrook) is informed by her mother, Peggy Mitchell (Barbara Windsor), that Tracey still holds a grudge against her. On 26 November, Tracey covers for both Peggy and her son, Phil Mitchell (Steve McFadden), when bailiffs asks for them, by pretending she is just a barmaid from an agency and does not know them. She then informs Phil's son, Ben Mitchell (Charlie Jones), that he needs to tell Phil that the bailiffs are looking for him and want to repossess his car.

In March 2009, Peggy's fiancé, Archie Mitchell (Larry Lamb) makes Tracey a cleaner at The Queen Vic, and she is pleased for the extra money. In April, Phil's girlfriend, Shirley Carter (Linda Henry) accuses him of drinking again. However, Phil covers this up by saying that he had broken a bottle of alcohol earlier, and Tracey backs him up. In December, Archie and his new fiancée, Janine Butcher (Charlie Brooks), take over the pub, ousting Peggy and her family. Tracey is unhappy with the way Archie and Janine treated Peggy and the rest of the Mitchell family, and when Janine tells Tracey to put some tinsel in her hair and to keep an eye on the Christmas dinner, Tracey leaves a note saying "Gone fishing", implying that she has resigned. When Mo Harris (Laila Morse) opens a betting circle on the identity of Archie's killer, she lists Tracey as the rank outsider, giving her the nickname 'Silent Assassin'.

In January 2010, the pub's new owner and Archie's daughter, Roxy Mitchell (Rita Simons), gives Tracey a warning for arriving two hours late, but Peggy explains that she asked her to come in late as she has done a lot of unpaid overtime recently. Later, Roxy sacks Tracey because she wants the pub to have younger bar staff. Peggy demands that Roxy begs Tracey to come back for the evening shift as workers like Tracey are "gold dust". Peggy tells Tracey on the phone that can have her job back but Tracey hangs up. Tracey decides to take Roxy to an unfair dismissal tribunal, so Roxy says she will audition a new barmaid, giving Tracey a chance but making sure she loses. However, when Roxy realises she does not know how to run a pub, she gives Tracey her job back. Tracey suggests a curry night, and Roxy is happy to leave Tracey in charge of it, saying it is the most she has ever heard her speak. In March, Billie Jackson (Devon Anderson) holds up The Queen Vic, asking Tracey for cash and saying he has a gun. She fills his bag with cash but Phil takes it off her. In September, following a fire at The Queen Vic, Tracey starts working at Ian Beale's (Adam Woodyatt) fish and chip shop. The next month, Ian's best friend, Alfie Moon (Shane Richie) offers Tracey her old job back at The Queen Vic, along with Stacey Branning (Lacey Turner), after he reopens the pub and she quits her job at the fish and chip shop.

In January 2011, Tracey appears behind the bar, questioning Alfie's wife, Kat Moon's (Jessie Wallace), decision to reopen the Vic, following the 'death' of her baby and offering to cover while Kat takes a break. Kat questions how Tracey leads a normal life, serving in the Vic and going home to her husband and tells her she wished she had her life. She then proceeds to enquire about how her son, Tom, is. Tracey sadly replies he is living with his father, implying Tracey is divorced from his birth father. Kat apologises and suggests perhaps Tracey needs the break more than she would, but Tracey laughs off the suggestion insisting she prefers to keep herself busy.

In June 2012, Tracey gives Stacey's mother, Jean Slater (Gillian Wright) her job back on the flower stall. However, Tracey later sacks her after she rows with customers, Michael Moon (Steve John Shepherd) and Janine.

In December 2013, Phil sells the pub to Mick Carter (Danny Dyer) and when Tracey arrives to work her shift, Mick's wife, Linda Carter (Kellie Bright) tells her that she is not wanted anymore. Shirley witnesses this and tells Linda that Tracey is "part of the furniture" at The Queen Vic. Tracey is then later seen when she and Linda become friends, and she resumes her job at The Queen Vic.

In September 2015, Tracey is shocked when she answers The Queen Vic telephone to Kathy Sullivan (Gillian Taylforth), who is believed to be dead. Kathy asks Tracey to pass on an address to Phil. After being confronted by Mick, she finds Phil. Phil tries to persuade her it was a joke, but Tracey is not convinced, and knows it was Kathy; she gives him Kathy's whereabouts. The following month, Tracey finally meets Kathy again and welcomes her home.

In April 2017, the freehold of The Queen Vic is sold when the Carters get into debt. Business consultant, Fi Browning (Lisa Faulkner), advises that the pub is overstaffed, and suggests two members of staff need to go. The Carter family refuse to sack Tracey, who they describe as "an institution", but new bar manager, Woody Woodward (Lee Ryan), insists Tracey has to go. An upset Tracey runs from the room after Woody sacks her. A farewell party for Tracey is thrown, but she decides not to show up for it and everyone decides to boycott The Queen Vic. Vincent Hubbard (Richard Blackwood) then offers Tracey a job at his bar, The Albert. When Linda returns from Watford, Fi is annoyed when Linda gives Tracey her job back without consulting her.

== Other appearances ==
In Tracey: A Day in the Life, it is revealed that Tracey has not spoken to her son Tom (Oliver Llewellyn Jenkins) in some years after he moved closer to his father, however he makes an appearance at Tracey's 60th birthday party. Tracey’s friend Sameera (Rekha John-Cheryian), who organised the party, invites Tom to stay the night, which he accepts. He makes a secret phone call, telling the person on the other end of the line that their 'little issue' may now be resolved.

The next day Tracey questions Tom about his wife Angela and their boys, and he tells her everything is fine. When he and Tracey come to Walford he reveals that he is in debt, and she realises he was just using her to access extra money. She shuts him out before having a chat with Elaine Peacock (Harriet Thorpe) and deciding to give him some money.

Tom then meets with a mystery woman who asks if he's told Tracey about her. Tom tells the woman they have to wait for the right time. It's soon revealed that this woman is Molly (Aretha Ayeh), Tom's new girlfriend. Molly reveals that Angela and Tom divorced the prior year and that Molly is now pregnant. Tracey is hurt that Tom had not told her sooner but after a chat, where Tracey tells Tom that his dad cheated on her, the two reconcile. Tom and Molly tell Tracey they're having a baby girl and invite her over to a baby shower with Molly's parents.

Tracey later heads to the Vic where Sameera sets her up on a date with Ethan (David Merchant), another long term friend of hers.

== Reception ==
Dek Hogan from Digital Spy hailed Tracey when she had a line of dialogue, and said it was "such a rare event that it's always worthy of a celebration. Fair play, she did mumble it a bit and it was so unmemorable that I've forgotten what it was she actually said but it was a line nonetheless." He also said that she, Winston (Ulric Browne) and other background characters should have a daytime soap, saying it would be a ratings winner. Jane Simon from the Daily Mirror said that whenever Tracey speaks, "it's worth listening to". Kris Green, also from Digital Spy, said that he wanted to ask scriptwriters to give more lines to Tracey, in addition to calling Tracey's scenes with Sean Slater (Robert Kazinsky) "iconic". Laura-Jayne Tyler from Inside Soap praised the storyline, writing, "Tracey's sacking from the Vic was terribly unfair – but also very educational! We now know she lives in East Ham, has been divorced twice – and suffered a cancer scare. Who'd have thought it? Meanwhile, actress Jane Slaughter enjoyed more screen time in a single episode of EastEnders than she has in the past 30-odd years. Every cloud, eh?". These scenes have also been described as an "outrage" by Radio Times. In 2020, Sarah Wallis and Ian Hyland from the Daily Mirror placed Tracey 98th on their ranked list of the best EastEnders characters of all time, calling her "infamously silent" and a character who has "seen everything" since the show's beginning. Heart has previously described Tracey as "iconic".

In February 2010, ahead of the 25th anniversary of EastEnders, Slaughter mentioned to Digital Spy about the amount of fans of Tracey that want her to speak more regularly, "My son was telling me the other day there's a [Facebook group] that says 'Let Tracey Speak' with 47,000 members. It just blows my head. I said, 'Oh, Ollie - I think you mean 4,700' and he went, 'No mum, forty seven thousand!' It makes me go a bit 'Woah!'" In 2017 when Tracey is sacked from the Queen Vic pub, a fan took it very seriously and exclaimed, "That's it I'm not watching EastEnders anymore now Tracey's been sacked from the pub." In scenes that aired on the show's 35th anniversary celebrations, Tracey tells Mo Harris (Laila Morse) that she once slept with Phil Mitchell (Steve McFadden). After this, a fan on Twitter described Tracey as a "dirty little devil".
