= Will Ye No Come Back Again =

- Upstairs, Downstairs episode
- Episode no.: Season 5 Episode 12
- Directed by: Bill Bain
- Written by: Rosemary Anne Sisson
- Production code: 16
- Original air date: 23 November 1975

Episode chronology
← Previous "Alberto"	Next → "Joke Over"

"Will Ye No Come Back Again" is the twelfth episode of the fifth and final series of the period drama Upstairs, Downstairs. It first aired on 23 November 1975 on ITV.

== Background ==
"Will Ye No Come Back Again" was recorded in the studio on 1, 7 and 8 August 1975. The Scotland location footage was filmed in Applecross in Wester Ross from 6 to 9 May. The idea behind part of the plot, regarding poaching, was taken from the 1953 film Laxdale Hall, which was written and produced by Alfred Shaughnessy, the script editor of Upstairs, Downstairs. The only main cast member needed for the location scenes was Gordon Jackson, who was provided with a double so he was only needed for one day of filming. Despite being the twelfth episode to air, "Will Ye No Come Back Again" was the last episode of Upstairs, Downstairs to be recorded in the studio.

The title of the episode is taken from the Scottish Jacobite song "Bonnie Charlie" written by Lady Nairne.

== Plot ==
Virginia, Alice, and Rose have gone to Paris. Richard, James, Georgina, and the servants go to stay in a house owned by Lord Berkhamstead in the Scottish Highlands. First to arrive are Hudson, Mrs. Bridges, Daisy and Ruby, only to find that there is no electricity as the generator is said to be broken, their grocery order has not arrived, and there is no wood for the fire. On the first evening Roderick McKay, Lord Berkhamstead's head ghillie, arrives and tells the servants the story of how the first laird died at the house after being mortally wounded at the Battle of Culloden. McKay says that the laird returns as a ghost on a handcart during the night. That evening Ruby hears a cart. When she hears the same sound a second night, she screams.

The following morning, James gets ready to go fly fishing until McKay tells him that there are no fish in the river. Richard goes to stay with a friend for a few days; while he is away James tells Georgina of his love for her. However, Georgina says that she does not love him in the same way anymore. James then leaves very early the following morning for London. Meanwhile, looking for the generator, Hudson and Edward find a room that has recently been used to prepare fish. During the night Hudson sees McKay and others poaching salmon. McKay and Hudson then come to a "gentlemen's agreement" that McKay will ensure there are fish for James, and the electricity and hot water also soon start to work. McKay also reveals that the noises Ruby heard were made by him.

When they get back to London, Richard and Georgina get a telegram from James saying he has gone to Liverpool, en route to visit Elizabeth in New York.

== Cast ==
- David Langton – Richard Bellamy
- Simon Williams – James Bellamy
- Lesley-Anne Down – Georgina Worsley
- Gordon Jackson – Hudson
- Angela Baddeley – Mrs Bridges
- Jack Watson – McKay
- Christopher Beeny – Edward
- Jacqueline Tong – Daisy
- Jenny Tomasin – Ruby
- Georgine Anderson – Mrs. McKay
- Kenneth Ward – Double for Gordon Jackson
