= John Batt (solicitor and composer) =

British solicitor and composer

Malcolm John Batt (1 May 1929 - 26 August 2017) was a British solicitor, who under the pen name John Malcolm was also a writer and composer of library music. He composed Non Stop, a short orchestral piece that was used as the ITV News theme tune from its inception in 1955 for over thirty years. Born in Salisbury, Wiltshire, he was a chorister at Salisbury Cathedral and won a scholarship to King's College, Taunton.

== Legal career ==
John Batt was articled with the Salisbury firm Whitehead, Vizard, Venn and Lush (now Whitehead Vizard). After national service, in which he acted as a court martial prosecutor for 18 months, he set up a firm of solicitors in Wimbledon - Batt Holden - staying there for 50 years. In 1964 he was also instrumental in establishing the solicitors Batt, Broadbent and Beecroft in his home town of Salisbury, to which he returned as a consultant in 2007.

Using the name John Malcolm, Batt wrote his first book Let's Make it Legal in 1966, one of a career series about life as a solicitor. In 2000 he represented Sally Clark, another solicitor who was wrongly convicted of murdering her two sons. Batt was part of the appeal team during a re-trial which ended in her acquittal. He wrote the book Stolen Innocence about the case in 2005, this time under the name John Batt.

Batt continued to take cases and act as a legal consultant well into his 80s. He died suddenly in Dorking, Surrey at the age of 88, having survived his wife Jane. There were three children - Gina, Charles and Joanna.

== Writer and composer ==
According to Philip Lane Non Stop was written in 1946 as a piano piece while Batt was aged 17 years old and still at school in Taunton, "to spite his music master who despised popular music". In 1951 the publishers and music library Francis Day & Hunter took it on and had it recorded in Belgium in an orchestral arrangement by Ivor Slaney. The ITN editor chose it as a theme tune in 1955 after advice from conductor John Barbirolli who suggested it during a visit. It remained in use for over thirty years. Non Stop was attributed to John Malcolm, as was his subsequent work in television drama scripts and music.

In 1969 he used Let's Make it Legal as the basis for the Yorkshire Television series The Main Chance (1969-1975), sharing the script writing with Edmund Ward and others. He also wrote the theme music. Batt was also part of the team at Yorkshire that created Justice (1971–73), another legal show, and wrote scripts for the BBC Two Series Trial (1971). He also wrote the music for other series, including Mischief (1969), and for commercials.
