= Alberto (Upstairs, Downstairs) =

- Upstairs, Downstairs episode
- Frederick on the set
- Episode no.: Season 5 Episode 11
- Directed by: Christopher Hodson
- Written by: Alfred Shaughnessy
- Production code: 10
- Original air date: 16 November 1975

Episode chronology
← Previous "The Understudy"	Next → "Will Ye No Come Back Again"

"Alberto" is the eleventh episode of the fifth and final series of the period drama Upstairs, Downstairs. It first aired on 16 November 1975 on ITV.

== Plot ==
It is June 1927. Lady Prudence accompanies James to Royal Ascot, and they stay near there for five days. Edward, who is Under Butler while Hudson is in Berlin with Lord and Lady Bellamy, goes with them.

Meanwhile, Lady Dolly Hale invites Paul Marvin, a film director, to 165 Eaton Place to see Georgina. Marvin arranges for Georgina to appear in the film he is currently making, Paris by Night. Lady Dolly takes a liking to Frederick, and they soon become secret lovers. When James returns from Ascot he dislikes the idea of Georgina appearing in a film, especially as a prostitute, and is worried when she tells him he is going for a costume fitting with Marvin. Later, James and Lady Prudence go to the film studio to see Georgina's scene being shot, unbeknownst to her. However, Lady Dolly has planned for Frederick, who is also in the film, and Georgina to have to kiss in the scene. Both Georgina and Frederick are unaware of this until the scene is about to be filmed, and when James sees the scene beginning he is furious and berates Lady Dolly, who has come to watch. Frederick then leaves, as do James and Lady Prudence. Georgina stays on the set, but Marvin advises she go back to her dressing room. However, they later dine together.

When James and Lady Prudence get back to Eaton Place, James admits that he is jealous when Georgina has fun, and Lady Prudence correctly guesses that he is in love with Georgina. Shortly after, an unrepentant Frederick gives in his notice, which a furious James accepts. Frederick then leaves the same day, telling the other servants that he has seen a new life for himself, appearing in films and escorting rich women.

== Cast ==
- Simon Williams – James Bellamy
- Joan Benham – Lady Prudence Fairfax
- Angela Baddeley – Mrs Bridges
- Jean Marsh – Rose
- Lesley-Anne Down – Georgina Worsley
- Christopher Beeny – Edward
- Gareth Hunt – Frederick
- Jacqueline Tong – Daisy
- Madeline Cannon – Lady Dolly Hale
- Seymour Green – Paul Marvin
- Rowland Davies – Assistant Director

== Background ==
"Alberto" was recorded in the studio on 15 and 16 May 1975. This episode marks the final appearance of Gareth Hunt as Frederick Norton.
