= Ulric Browne =

British actor

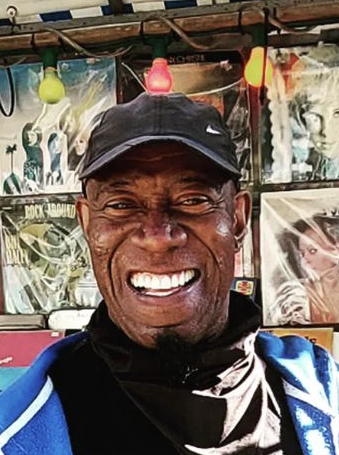
- Browne in 2022
- Occupation: Actor
- Years active: 1985–present
- Known for: Role of Winston in EastEnders (1985–present)

Ulric Browne is a British actor, known for portraying the background role of Winston in BBC soap opera EastEnders.

== Education ==
Browne studied at Mountview Academy of Theatre Arts.

== Career ==
Since November 1985, Browne has appeared in BBC soap opera EastEnders, portraying the role of Winston, a man that runs a market stall in Walford. He is the show's longest-serving male extra and the show's second longest-serving extra, behind Jane Slaughter's character Tracey. Browne also played Marcus in One Way Out in 1989, and had the guest role of Benny Hughes in The Bill in 2003. In 2004, he played Tiko in The Quiet Storm.
