= The Understudy (Upstairs, Downstairs) =

- Upstairs, Downstairs episode
- Episode no.: Season 5 Episode 10
- Directed by: James Ormerod
- Written by: Jeremy Paul
- Production code: 14
- Original air date: 9 November 1975

Episode chronology
← Previous "The Nine Days Wonder"	Next → "Alberto"

"The Understudy" is the tenth episode of the fifth and final season of the period drama Upstairs, Downstairs. It first aired on 9 November 1975 on ITV.

== Background ==
"The Understudy" was recorded in the studio on 10 and 11 July 1975. Shortly before this episode aired, an episode of Carry On Laughing called "And In My Lady's Chamber" was broadcast. This was a spoof of Upstairs, Downstairs with Joan Sims as Mrs Breeches and Jack Douglas as Clodson, and the Bellamys became the Pellamys. Three weeks later, another Carry On Laughing episode used the same characters in the episode "Who Needs Kitchener?", a spoof of the fourth series of Upstairs, Downstairs. After "The Understudy" had been filmed, the main cast of Upstairs, Downstairs filmed the Christmas documentary Russell Harty Goes...Upstairs, Downstairs, which was aired on Boxing Day 1975.

== Plot ==
It is September 1926 and the French Ambassador M. Fleariau, and his wife and daughter, are coming to dinner at 165 Eaton Place. Virginia is in Scotland and cannot return as she has a bad fever. Georgina offers to cancel her sailing weekend to act as hostess, and she persuades James to cancel his day of polo to give her support.

On the evening of the dinner, Hudson collapses and Dr. Foley is sent for. The doctor confirms that Hudson has had a mild heart attack. A debate then starts downstairs as to who will take Hudson's place that evening as butler, with Daisy pushing for her husband Edward, but Frederick believing it should be himself. Upstairs, although James favours Frederick, Georgina and Richard choose Edward, who performs his duties as butler very well. He makes one error when he forgets to decant the claret, and Frederick takes the opportunity to remind him to do so. Mrs Bridges proves incapable of completing the cooking after Mr Hudson's collapse, but Rose and Ruby rally round to complete the meal.

Dr. Foley says that Hudson needs a couple of months of rest to recuperate, and it is arranged for him to go and stay with Mr and Mrs. Tranter, a couple who live near the Southwold estate in Wiltshire. Frederick attempts to curry favour with James in order to be chosen as temporary butler, but Daisy argues fiercely with him and tries to persuade Edward to put himself forward. Once again, the family argue as to who should act as butler while Hudson is away. James favours Frederick, but Richard, Georgina and Virginia (via the telephone) all favour Edward, and he is chosen.

Before he goes, Hudson tells Mrs. Bridges that he has left everything he has to her should he die, and Mrs. Bridges says she has done the same for him. Hudson gives Edward the keys to the silver cupboard and wine cellar, and his accounts book. As he leaves, Mrs Bridges cries.

== Cast ==
- Gordon Jackson - Hudson
- David Langton - Richard Bellamy
- Simon Williams - James Bellamy
- Lesley-Anne Down - Georgina Worsley
- Jean Marsh - Rose
- Angela Baddeley - Mrs Bridges
- Christopher Beeny - Edward
- Gareth Hunt - Frederick
- Jenny Tomasin - Ruby
- Jacqueline Tong - Daisy
- Anthony Woodruff - Dr. Foley
- Andre Charisse - M. Fleuriau
- Barbara Bolton - Madame Fleuriau
- Natalie Caron - Simone Fleauriau
- Philip Webb - Lord Swanbourne
- Lorna Kilner - Lady Swanbourne
- Roy Knight - Ambulance Man
- David Nicholl - Ambulance Man
