= The Main Chance =

British TV drama series (1969–1975)

- Genre: Legal drama
- Created by: Edmund Ward; John Malcolm
- Starring: John Stride; Kate O'Mara; Margaret Ashcroft; John Wentworth; Anna Palk
- Composer: Anthony Isaac
- Country of origin: United Kingdom
- Original language: English
- No. of series: 4
- No. of episodes: 45 (list of episodes)

Production
- Producer: John Frankau
- Production company: Yorkshire Television

Original release
- Network: ITV
- Release: 18 June 1969 – 18 July 1975

The Main Chance is a British television series that first aired on ITV in four series between 1969 and 1975. It is a drama series that depicts the sudden transformation in the life of a solicitor, David Main (played by John Stride), after he moves from London to Leeds. It was created by Edmund Ward and John Malcolm; the latter was a pseudonym for John Batt who was a practising solicitor. Batt also composed the theme music.

== Episodes ==
In all, 45 episodes were aired, each around 45 to 50 minutes long and divided into three parts. The first series, shown in 1969, was in black and white. From then on the show went out in colour. The first series consisted of six episodes, while subsequent series contained thirteen episodes each. The three later series were transmitted in 1970, 1972 and 1975.

| Series | Episodes | Originally released | |
| Series | Episodes | First released | Last released |
|---|---|---|---|
| 1 | 6 | 18 June 1969 | 23 July 1969 |
| 2 | 13 | 14 September 1970 | 7 December 1970 |
| 3 | 13 | 7 June 1972 | 30 August 1972 |
| 4 | 13 | 18 April 1975 | 18 July 1975 |

== Cast ==
- John Stride – David Main
- Kate O'Mara – Julia Main (Series 1)
- Margaret Ashcroft – Margaret Castleton
- John Wentworth – Henry Castleton
- Anna Palk – Sarah Courtney (later Lady Radchester) (Series 1–3)
- Philip Bond – Peter Findon (Series 1–2,4)
- John Arnatt – Sidney Bulmer (Series 1–2)
- Gareth Forwood – Julian Webb (Series 2)
- Glynn Edwards – Walter Clegg (Series 3–4)
- Estelle Kohler – Hilary Nash (Series 3)
- Sharon Maughan – Inge Lindstrom (Series 4)
- Ingrid Hafner – Laura Granton (Series 4)
- Gary Bond – Andrew Retford (Series 4)

== Home video ==
All four series have been released on DVD in the UK.
