= Justice (1971 TV series) =

1970s British drama TV series (1971–1974)

- Starring: Margaret Lockwood
- Country of origin: United Kingdom
- Original language: English
- No. of series: 3
- No. of episodes: 39

Production
- Running time: 50 minutes
- Production company: Yorkshire Television

Original release
- Network: ITV
- Release: 8 August 1971 – 16 October 1974

Justice is a British drama television series that originally aired on ITV in 39 hour-long episodes between 8 August 1971 and 16 October 1974. Margaret Lockwood stars as Harriet Peterson, a female barrister in the North of England. It was made by Yorkshire Television and was based loosely on Justice Is a Woman, an episode of ITV Playhouse broadcast in 1969 in which Lockwood had played barrister Julia Stanford. The theme music is Crown Imperial by William Walton.

The series was repeated in the UK by Talking Pictures TV in 2021/22.

== Cast ==
=== Main ===
- Margaret Lockwood as Harriet Peterson
- John Stone as Doctor Ian Moody
- John Bryans as Arthur Bollington (season 1, episode 2) / William Corletti, Senior Clerk at Harriet's Cahmber. (seasons 2–3, 22 episodes)
- Philip Stone as Sir John Gallagher QC, head of Harriet's Chamber. He later becomes a judge. (seasons 1–2, 11 episodes)
- Anthony Valentine as Robert Miller (season 1, episode 11) / James Eliot (season 3, 8 episodes)
- Rosie Collins as Rosie (season 3, 8 episodes)

=== Guests (partial) ===
- Alun Armstrong as Bob Graham (1 episode)
- Angela Thorne as Eileen Rutherford, a social worker (3 episodes)
- Brian Wilde as Latimer / Prison Doctor (2 episodes)
- David Graham as Farber Tapworth (2 episodes)
- Ed Devereaux as Frank Ronce (2 episodes)
- Geoffrey Whitehead as Brian Bex / Major Bilton (2 episodes)
- Gerald Cross as Judge (2 episodes)
- Joss Ackland as Sir Robert Beste (1 episode)
- Leon Vitali as Brian Parsons (2 episodes)
- Michael Coles as Detective Sergeant Gable (3 episodes)
- Paul Eddington as Cooper / Kendall Blumenthal (2 episodes)
- Percy Herbert as Supt. Kellaway (3 episodes)
- Peter Blythe as Sommerfield (2 episodes)
- Peter Sallis as Coroner (season 1, episode 8)
- Raymond Huntley as High Court Judge (2 episodes)
- Sarah Douglas as Jenny Deane (2 episodes)
- Veronica Lang as Secretary (season 1, episode 11)

== Plot ==
The series follows Harriet Peterson, a barrister practising in the north of England (Series 1) who later moved to London, as she takes on a wide range of legal cases. Known for her intelligence, determination, and strong sense of justice, Peterson represents clients in matters ranging from criminal trials to civil disputes.

Each episode typically centres on a different case, exploring legal, moral, and social issues. Peterson often defends individuals facing serious accusations, including violent crime, while also handling cases involving family law, negligence, and professional misconduct. Her work frequently places her in challenging situations that test both her legal skills and personal principles.

Alongside her courtroom work, the series also touches on Peterson's personal life, including her relationship with Dr. Ian Moody, and the pressures of balancing professional responsibilities with private concerns.

== Episodes ==
Series	Episodes	Originally released	
Series	Episodes	First released	Last released
1	13	8 October 1971	14 January 1972
2	13	9 February 1973	4 May 1973
3	13	17 May 1974	16 August 1974

=== Series 1 (1971) ===
No. overall	No. in series	Title	Directed by	Written by	Original release date
1	1	"The Most Important Thing of All"	James Ormerod	James Mitchell	8 October 1971
Struck-off solicitor and ex-con James Kirby (William Franklyn) persuades his former wife, barrister Harriet Peterson (Margaret Lockwood) to represent his old cell mate, Eddy Plater (Victor Maddern) who has been charged with committing a bank robbery. While Peterson's defence was eventually successful, Kirby tries to earn extra money from Plater by changing the presiding judge through impersonating the solicitor's and court clerks in turn, which earned Harriet's instructing solicitor a reprimand from the judge. Confronted by Peterson, Kirby admits the fraud and realises his attempt at a reconciliation has failed.
2	2	"By Order of The Magistrates"	Tony Wharmby	Edmund Ward	15 October 1971
A group of three officials has to decide whether two troubled Maguire boys should stay with their mother, Sandra, who runs a messy house and picks up men, or with their returned father, David, represented by Harriet, who has limited prospects.
3	3	"Witnesses Cost Extra"	James Ormerod	John Malcolm	22 October 1971
Harriet goes up against sleazy defence lawyer, who charges extra to produce and temper the witnesses. Unhappy with Harriet's decision to give up using an under-cover agent, the police reports Harriet to the Bar Council.
4	4	"The Rain It Raineth"	Tony Wharmby	Ray Jenkins	29 October 1971
The son of Harriet's friend is bullied by two older delinquent boys into confessing to having broken into a warehouse, where the watchman is injured.
5	5	"Within A Year And A Day"	Christopher Hodson	Ray Jenkins	5 November 1971
The night watchman dies from the injury sustained from the robbery in the previous episode, resulting in an additional trial on the charge of murder.
6	6	"To Help An Old School Friend"	Christopher Hodson	James Mitchell	12 November 1971
When a physicist in a top-secret facility is found dead, Harriet risks losing her work by helping the man's mother, a school friend who suspects a bodyguard at the facility who is in a relationship with the widow, establish a murder case.
7	7	"No Flowers By Request"	Christopher Hodson	David Lees	19 November 1971
A Chicago style gangster manages to intimidate any cronies who could testify to the authorities about a beating. Harriet tries to help the son (Richard Beckinsale) of one of these cronies who is also threatened.
8	8	"When Did You First Feel The Pain?"	Tony Wharmby	John Malcolm	26 November 1971
The start of a new relationship for Harriet as she helps a doctor accused of prescribing a fatal antibiotic.
9	9	"A Nice Straightforward Treason"	Christopher Hodson	James Mitchell	3 December 1971
A female patient of Harriet's new doctor friend is caught up in a spy scandal.
10	10	"People Have Too Many Rights"	James Ormerod	John Malcolm	10 December 1971
After an ambitious young policeman fails to bring a case against two ruffians who trashed a restaurant, his embittered superior brings a case of his own, against the policeman, accused of taking bribes from them.
11	11	"You Didn't Pay For Justice"	Christopher Hodson	James Mitchell	17 December 1971
Cajoled into doing a morning motoring group case labelled a quick guilty plea, Harriet lands up representing the defendant as not guilty, delaying an afternoon appearance at another court, resulting in a judge's tongue lashing.
12	12	"A Licence to Build Your Own Money"	Christopher Hodson	James Mitchell	7 January 1972
Harriet and Sir John are offered a lucrative case: an appeal by a shifty and inexperienced capitalist to a decision by the county council, led by a feudal ex-brigadier, that went against a massive development project in a rural preserve.
13	13	"A Duty to the Court"	James Ormerod	Edmund Ward	14 January 1972
After anonymous letters, a woman's dead husband is disinterred and she is accused of murder. Defending her, Harriet is conflicted by her duty to reveal an incriminating letter the suspect had written.

=== Series 2 (1973) ===
No. overall	No. in series	Title	Directed by	Written by	Original release date
14	1	"Conspiracy"	James Ormerod	John Batt	9 February 1973
Moving to London to further her career, Harriet gets involved with a case of two young activists who advocate revolutionary violence and who were caught up with explosives after several deaths from a bombing.
15	2	"Malicious Damage"	James Ormerod	Kevin Laffan	16 February 1973
Settling in to her new apartment, Harriet gets involved with a case where a rich husband damages a portrait of his wife, nude, being painted by an arrogant young artist.
16	3	"A Libel Among Friends"	Tony Wharmby	Bill MacIlwraith	23 February 1973
After an engagement is broken, the fiance brings charges against the spinster for writing a letter to his council accusing him of trying to profit off a property belonging to her family.
17	4	"The Whole Truth?"	Alan Bromly	Bill MacIlwraith	2 March 1973
A police officer whose brother-in-law was supposedly hurt by a gangster, is accused of planting evidence on the gangster's person and in his car, to get him convicted on a break in charge.
18	5	"One For The Road"	Tony Wharmby	Bill MacIlwraith	9 March 1973
A diabetic who drank liquor by mistake kills three people behind the wheel. In a parallel story, Harriet's doctor friend tries to rehabilitate a frequently incarcerated thief, without success.
19	6	"Divorce"	Tony Wharmby	Kevin Laffan	16 March 1973
Paying a rare visit, Harriet's son, Michael, reminds her of the divorced husband she doesn't want to talk to.In a parallel story, the woman in a popular nostalgia singing duo avoids going to court to divorce her wayward husband. Dr. Moody's aunt Deborah comes down from Aberdeen.
20	7	"After All, What Is A Lie?"	Alan Bromly	John Batt	23 March 1973
The husband of one of Dr. Moody's patients brings charges against Moody that he has engaged in adultery with the man's wife.
21	8	"Harriet Peterson v Dr. Moody"	Tony Wharmby	Henry Cecil	30 March 1973
Harriet's relationship with Dr. Moody hits an impasse. After a close call, stopped for reckless driving, she's asked to sit on a panel sentencing a railroad worker for similar thoughtless behaviour. Meanwhile her QC application waits.
22	9	"For Those In Peril"	Alan Bromly	Bill MacIlwraith	6 April 1973
The work load and the increased tension with Dr. Moody are starting to take a toll on Harriet's health. Nevertheless she helps a captain win a judgment in a trawler case.
23	10	"Dummy Scoular Against The Crown"	James Ormerod	Kevin Laffan	13 April 1973
Harriet defends a militant communist head of a pipe fitters union, who takes his men into a strike to gain pay parity with members of a rival union. The trade union leader is not afraid to be charged with contempt of court.
24	11	"Nobody's That Good"	Alan Bromly	John Batt	20 April 1973
The school-age son of the barristers' clerk is ready to start a stint in the office when he is arrested for participating in a mugging, with three other youths, of a pompous and reactionary military man.
25	12	"Covenant For Quiet Enjoyment"	James Ormerod	John Batt	27 April 1973
Harriet finds herself trying to secure an appeal for her clerk's son, and protecting a couple of young tenants from an out-of-control landlord.
26	13	"Trespass To The Person"	James Ormerod	John Batt	4 May 1973
Sir John tries to succeed his late uncle as Member of Parliament while promised quick promotion to Attorney General, while his local party chairman, a man burgled repeatedly, builds a gun trap at his door which wounds a youth who Harriet had just obtained bail for.

=== Series 3 (1974) ===
No. overall	No. in series	Title	Directed by	Written by	Original release date	Prod. code
27	1	"Trial For Murder"	John Frankau	David Ambrose	17 May 1974	1734
A wife is accused of feeding cheese to her ailing elderly husband, after a doctor had supposedly warned her it was one of the foods that might not agree with her husband's medications. Harriet's office has a flashy, young new partner.
28	2	"The Price of Innocence"	Mark Cullingham	John Batt	24 May 1974	1736
With news Sir John is becoming a judge, the barristers vote on a new Head of Chambers. Meanwhile Harriet defends a feisty truck driver accused of killing a pedestrian, before an openly biased judge.
29	3	"Duty of Care"	Mark Cullingham	John Batt	31 May 1974	1735
Dr. Moody's partners want him out. Meanwhile Harriet goes up against a former Attorney General in a case in which a drug manufacturer is accused of not offering proper warning of side effects, after a man's wife dies from taking one of their tablets.
30	4	"Growing Up"	Tony Wharmby	Ian Curteis	7 June 1974	1739
Harriet defends the troubled 19 year old son of the chief constable who sent her ex-husband down. The boy is accused of rape but refuses to speak up to help his case.
31	5	"The Fine Line of Duty"	John Frankau	David Ambrose	21 June 1974	1733
A politician friend of Dr. Moody is in the spotlight, with a tribunal Harriet assists, over an industrial plant the parliamentarian helped get built, from which a chemical leak has taken three victims.
32	6	"It's Always a Gamble"	David Farnham	David Ambrose	28 June 1974	1737
James argues strenuously for a worker disabled by "contributory negligence" while Harriet helps a disturbed young lady who neglected her nanny job to leave a baby alone in a carriage.
33	7	"Matrimonial Malice"	Mark Cullingham	Bill MacIlwraith	5 July 1974	1732
A surgeon is charged by his wife of "malicious wounding" whereas he calls her psychologically disturbed. Bill feels pressured by work-obsessed Harriet's increased demands for accounting paperwork
34	8	"Persona Non Grata"	Tony Wharmby	Bill MacIlwraith	12 July 1974	1740
James tries to help an Indian student threatened with deportation, while in a parallel case Harriet helps a nosy American tycoon prove that his daughter was part of a plot to steal his favourite painting, a Modigliani.
35	9	"Twice the Legal Limit"	Brian Farnham	John Batt	19 July 1974	1738
Justice Bebbington, who has given Harriet trouble with his mean spirited sentencing, asks her to defend him in a case of drunken driving. Something about the setup strikes her as suspicious.
36	10	"Under Suspicion"	Brian Farnham	David Ambrose	26 July 1974	1741
James is accused of bribing a policeman by another policeman who resents how James had challenged him in previous cases. But there is more to the story than meets the eye, including a witness hiding a prostitution ring scandal.
37	11	"Decisions, Decisions"	Brian Farnham	Eric Wendell	2 August 1974	1742
A spoiled aristocratic couple waste the Court's time staging a bickering fest for mercenary gain. James ponders a departure. The pushy US businessman Harriet had once helped returns with a proposal.
38	12	"Point of Death"	Tony Wharmby	Bruce Stewart	9 August 1974	1743
Harriet and Ian clash, when a doctor is accused of hastening the death of an accident victim, so the kidneys can be transferred to a woman who needs them, with whom the doctor has a suspicious connection.
39	13	"Collision Course"	Tony Wharmby	Bill MacIlwraith	16 August 1974	1744
Harriet has to become an expert on maritime law to defend a Greek ship owner who had chartered out his boat but is still accused of responsibility for an accident with another vessel. But what of her future with Ian?

== DVD release ==
The complete series is available on DVD in the UK in three series sets.
