= The Hanged Man (TV series) =

- Genre: Crime Drama
- Created by: Edmund Ward
- Starring: Colin Blakely; Michael Williams; Gary Watson
- Country of origin: United Kingdom
- No. of episodes: 8

Production
- Producer: Yorkshire Television
- Running time: 50 minutes

Original release
- Network: ITV
- Release: 15 February – 5 April 1975

The Hanged Man is a British crime drama series that aired on ITV in 1975. It was created and written by Edmund Ward.

== Cast ==
- Colin Blakely – Lew Burnett
- Michael Williams – Alan Crowe
- Gary Watson – John Quentin
- David Daker – Piet Hollander
- John Rees – Brian Nelson
- Angela Browne – Elizabeth Hayden
- Brian Croucher – Sammy Grey
- William Lucas – George Pilgrim
- Frank Wylie – David Larson
- Julian Glover – Joe Denver
- Jenny Hanley – Druscilla
- Peter Halliday – Jean-Claud de Salle
- John Bay – Sam Lambert
- William Russell – Peter Kroger
- Michael Coles – Hans Ericksen
- Gareth Hunt – Eddie Malone
- Jack Watson – Douglas McKinnon
- Bill Mitchell – Harry Friedman
- Alan MacNaughtan – Charles Galbraith
- Naomi Chance - Jane Cowley
- Tenniel Evans - Joseph
- Victor Brooks - Nightwatchman
- Fred Feast - Josef
- John F. Landry - Turtle
- Eric Mason - Kenny Simpson

== Plot ==
Lew Burnett is a self-made man who owns a huge construction company. However, his success has bred resentment and after his wife is killed in a plane crash a third attempt is made on Lew's life. He then decides to pretend to be dead to avoid any more attempts on his life and find out who is trying to kill him and why. He is helped by Alan Crowe, an old friend. Burnett travels around the world to trace the nine potential suspects. In each episode, Burnett is caught up in a fight of some sort.

== Episodes ==
1. "Wheel of Fortune" (15 February 1975)
2. "Tower of Destruction" (22 February 1975)
3. "Knave of Coins" (7 March 1975)
4. "Chariot of Earth" (14 March 1975)
5. "The Bridge Maker" (14 March 1975)
6. "Grail and Platter" (21 March 1975)
7. "Laws of Fortune" (28 March 1975)
8. "Ring of Return" (5 April 1975)

== Turtle ==
The series also introduces a shady thief called Turtle played by John F. Landry. This character would later have his own series called Turtle's Progress.

== Music ==
Music for the show was written by Alan Tew. The same score would turn up on such programmes like The Two Ronnies, The People's Court, SpongeBob SquarePants and the 2009 film Black Dynamite.
