= Jane Slaughter (actor) =

British actress

- Born: England
- Education: Elmhurst Ballet School
- Occupation: Actress
- Years active: 1975–present
- Known for: Role of Tracey in EastEnders (1985–present)
- Children: 2

Jane Slaughter is an English actress. She is known for portraying the background role of Tracey in BBC soap opera EastEnders. Slaughter has portrayed Tracey since the initial episode of EastEnders on 19 February 1985, making her the longest serving character on the show, with no breaks or temporary exits.

== Early life ==
As a child, Slaughter trained at Elmhurst Ballet School.

== Career ==
Slaughter made her debut television appearance as Petrova in Ballet Shoes in 1975, and in 1976, she appeared as Bella in three episodes of Katy. In 1981, she portrayed the role of Joanna in The History Man.

In 1985, Slaughter began portraying the role of Tracey in the BBC soap opera EastEnders. In an interview with Radio Times, she stated "As a child, I was lucky and worked continually. Then I got in to my late teens and I lost my way. I wanted to play it safe, didn't want to be brave, and never made that leap to adult actress." Slaughter is currently the longest serving character on EastEnders, since Adam Woodyatt took a break from the show between 2021 and 2023.

== Personal life ==
Slaughter has two sons.

== Filmography ==
Year	Title	Role	Notes
1975	Ballet Shoes	Petrova Fossil	Main role
1976	Katy	Bella	3 episodes
1980	Dr. Jekyll and Mr. Hyde	Gwen	Television film
1981	The History Man	Joanna	2 episodes
1985–present	EastEnders	Tracey	1300+ episodes
1993	Dimensions in Time	Tracey	Television special
1999	Pudding Lane	Tracey	Television special
2014	The Ghosts of Ian Beale	Tracey	Television special
2024	Tracey: A Day in the Life	Tracey	Online spin-off series, 5 episodes
