= Edmund Ward (screenwriter) =

British novelist and screenwriter (1928–1993)

Edmund Ward (23 February 1928 – 12 July 1993) was a British novelist and screenwriter.

Before he was 20 he had read every book in the library in his determination to "master all aspects of the written word". To further this aim he graduated from the London School of Printing and Graphic Arts with diplomas in print production and typography as well as with a diploma in Scandinavian language and literature from a Swedish Hogskola.

His first novel – Summer in Retreat – won the Author's Club Award in 1957. He also wrote The Gravy Train (1958) and The Private Tightrope (1960). He later moved into TV, writing for: A Prayer for the Dying, Amsterdam Affair, Bergerac, The Challenges, Front Page Story, Gentlemen and Players, Goodbye Gemini, Grady, The Hanged Man, Justice, Kings and Desperate Men, Man in a Suitcase, The Main Chance, Murder, The Plane Makers, The Power Game, The Professionals, Turtle's Progress (1990), The Violent Enemy, ITV Play of the Week. He produced The Hanged Man. In between these he wrote his last novel The Baltic Emerald (1980).
