= List of EastEnders characters introduced in 1986 =

EastEnders logo

The following is a list of characters that first appeared in the BBC soap opera EastEnders in 1986, by order of first appearance. All characters were introduced by the show's co-creator Julia Smith. The first character to be introduced during the year is John Fisher (Dave Dale), a drag queen hired for The Queen Victoria pub. Jan Hammond (Jane How), the long-term mistress of Den Watts (Leslie Grantham), was introduced in January. March sees the first appearances of The Firm mobster Brad Williams (Jonathan Stratt), Dot Cotton's (June Brown) husband Charlie Cotton (Christopher Hancock) and new brewery area manager James Willmott-Brown (William Boyde). The newborn daughter of Michelle Fowler (Susan Tully), Vicki Fowler (Emma Herry), was introduced in May.

In June, Judith Jacob and Pam St. Clement made their debuts as health visitor Carmel Jackson and Pat Butcher, the former wife of Pete Beale (Peter Dean). June also sees the beginning of a new storyline, The Banned, which introduces Harry Reynolds (Gareth Potter), Tessa Parker (Josephine Melville) and Eddie Hunter (Simon Henderson). Irene (Katherine Parr), the aunt of Lofty Holloway (Tom Watt), begins appearing from July. Michael Cashman and Donald Tandy joined the cast as middle-class yuppie Colin Russell and army war veteran Tom Clements respectively in August. New general practitioner Jaggat Singh (Amerjit Deu) and Barry Clark (Gary Hailes), a love interest for Colin, make their first appearances in November. Rezaul Kabir (Tanveer Ghani), the cousin of Naima Jeffery (Shreela Ghosh), is introduced in December. Additionally, multiple other characters appear throughout the year.

== John Fisher ==
John Fisher
- EastEnders character
- Portrayed by: Dave Dale
- First appearance: Episode 98; 28 January 1986
- Last appearance: Episode 108; 27 February 1986
In-universe information
- Occupation: Drag queen

John Fisher, played by Dave Dale, is a drag queen who is hired by publican Angie Watts (Anita Dobson) in January 1986 to perform for the premier drag night at The Queen Victoria public house. Following the publicity over Angie's drink driving case, she and her husband, Den (Leslie Grantham), worry that the brewery which owns the pub might find cause to cancel their tenancy, and 'free entertainment' is seen as a way to bolster the evening trade.

The first drag night is a success until Pete Beale (Peter Dean) starts heckling the performer. John mistakes Pete's intent, thinking he wants to join in with the act. John playfully takes Pete's pint on-stage and Pete leaps after it, causing a tussle to ensue. Seconds later, Den finds himself on the floor breaking up the pair. The surprise arrival of Den's mistress, Jan Hammond (Jane How), prompts Den to close the pub early, so the act is halted prematurely.

Sharon Watts (Letitia Dean) is quite impressed with the drag artiste and thinks him to be a caring and sensitive person. When he mentions that his other job is delivering 'kiss-o-grams', she hatches a plan for starting her own business. John performs several more drag evenings in The Vic. His last appearance is on 27 February 1986.

== Jan Hammond ==
Jan Hammond
- EastEnders character
- Portrayed by: Jane How
- Duration: 1986–1987, 2002–2003
- First appearance: Episode 100; 30 January 1986
- Last appearance: Episode 2594; 26 September 2003
In-universe information
- Occupation: Art gallery worker Pub landlady
- Husband: Dario Chimisso (1987–)

Jan Hammond, played by Jane How, appears in 1986 as the long-term mistress of Den Watts (Leslie Grantham). Jan is considered by the locals as a posh upper-class sort of woman and works at an art gallery. Den has an affair with her while he is still married to Angie Watts (Anita Dobson). She is always hated by Angie and Den's adopted daughter Sharon Watts (Letitia Dean) but she tries her best to get along with her. She moves into The Queen Victoria at one point on Den's insistence, but is not much of a landlady so moves out soon after. Den tries to leave Angie for Jan so he tells Angie he is leaving her. Angie grows desperate and to stop him from leaving her she tells him that she only has six months to live. Den believes her but discovers many months later that she is lying while they are on holiday in Venice. Den serves Angie divorce papers on Christmas Day 1986.

Eventually, Jan grows tired of Den not having a proper relationship with her, so she ends their affair after he refuses to leave Walford with her. She leaves Walford in 1987 and goes on to marry a man called Dario Chimisso (Marino Mase) on a gondola in Venice. She makes a brief return in 2002 for Angie's funeral. She returns to give Sharon a portrait that Den had left with her many years earlier. She briefly returns again in 2003 in a lead-up to Den's return 14 years since he has been shot and presumed dead by an employee of the gangland organisation The Firm. Den's long lost son Dennis Rickman (Nigel Harman) tracks Jan down and she reveals that Den had survived the shooting and came to her for help. With her help, Den was able to flee to Spain to protect himself and his family.

== Brad Williams ==
Brad Williams
- EastEnders character
- Portrayed by: Jonathan Stratt
- Duration: 1986–1989
- First appearance: Episode 109; 4 March 1986
- Last appearance: Episode 423; 23 February 1989
In-universe information
- Occupation: Gangster

Brad Williams, played by Jonathan Stratt, is a mobster heavy for the East End gangster organisation known as The Firm. He is of low importance within the organisation and is generally used as an errand boy. He is first seen in March 1986 and over the next two years he appears occasionally to inform Den Watts (Leslie Grantham) of his bosses' orders. Den works in league with the Firm on a variety of dodgy dealings.

Towards the end of 1987 Brad is instructed to scare graphic designer Colin Russell (Michael Cashman), who is a jury member in a trial for an associate of the Firm. Brad and Den put pressure on Colin to give a verdict of 'not guilty' at the trial, and when he refuses Brad steals his keys and vandalises his flat, causing all sorts of problems for Colin.

During 1988 Brad is seen more frequently, turning up to aid the running of the Firm's business in Walford, Strokes winebar, which is being managed by Den and is really a front for an illegal gambling den. The petty criminal Darren Roberts (Gary McDonald) manages to get on the wrong side of Brad when he tries to play him off against the owner of The Dagmar, James Willmott-Brown (William Boyde). The Firm's money lending business, 'Walford Investments', are in the process of securing the takeover of James' ailing winebar, albeit against his wishes. Darren, sensing an opportunity, promises to provide James protection against the Firm, whilst all the while attempting to get onto the Firm's payroll via Brad. Incensed by Darren's audacity, Brad takes him aside and gives him a severe beating, and Darren leaves Walford shortly after.

In July 1988, Den discovers Kathy Beale (Gillian Taylforth) after she had been raped by James Willmott-Brown, and instantly seeks revenge. He demands retribution from his contacts within the Firm, Brad and Joanne Francis (Pamela Salem), and is enraged when they refused to act. Den manages to persuade Brad to help him anyway by conning him into thinking that James' downfall will please his bosses and Den watches with glee as the Dagmar burns down in flames. However the resulting police investigation puts the Firm's business in serious jeopardy. They then decide that to put a halt to the investigation either Brad or Den have to take the blame for the arson attack. Neither Brad nor Den is willing to take the blame, and both are then involved in a personal war to persuade the other to take the rap.

Brad immediately calls on the services of Rod Norman (Christopher McHallem), via threats, and forces him to give the police a tip off about Den. The police begin questioning Den and realising that he has gotten in way over his head, he decides that he will accept the blame for the arson, but instead of serving time in prison, he decides to flee the country to avoid arrest. The Firm agree to this and Den is taken into hiding. However the Firm subsequently set up a hit on Den, which fails when he escapes from hiding and turns himself into the police to avoid the Firm's heavies.

As the Firm busy themselves with ways in which to silence Den from inside, Brad causes more grief by doing a bit of moonlighting; breaking into several people's houses on the Square with an accomplice who works as a cab driver for Ali Osman (Nejdet Salih). The burglaries result in a greater police presence in the area. The Firm are not impressed and Gregory Mantel (Pavel Douglas) – a superior member of the Firm – threatens Brad with serious repercussions should his deviance continue. Brad stops the burglaries, but his accomplice continues without him and is eventually caught by the police and is quick to implicate Brad. The investigating officer, D.I. Ashley, decides to use this piece of information to manipulate the dimwitted Brad. He threatens to put him in prison unless he acts as an informant. Brad is forced to relay information on The Firm. Strokes is closed down as a result and various members of the Firm are arrested. With the Firm under threat from the police, Gregory Mantel decides that Den has to be the informant and makes arrangements to have him eliminated.

On the day of Den's trial, Mantel's heavies break Den out of custody and take him to the Firm's headquarters, where he is greeted by Brad. Brad imprisons him in a room to await the arrival of Mantel. However, Den is not about to go down without a fight and knowing how easily influenced Brad is, he makes one last attempt to secure his freedom. He plays upon Brad's fears, relaying that he had heard that Brad is to be the next victim on the Firm's hit-list. Brad is easily swayed and he decides to help Den escape. He lures the other gang member, Marco, into the cell where an awaiting Den jumps him and throws him to the floor, whilst Brad locks him up in Den's place. The two then escape from the headquarters, and Brad speeds off in his car, leaving Den to fend for himself.

Brad immediately goes to the police and hands himself in. He promises to confess everything he knows regarding the arson, Den, and the Firm. Meanwhile, Mantel, who is furious with Brad's betrayal, tracks Den down, he is shot and presumed dead for over 14 years. However he returns to Walford in 2003, revealing that he had faked his own death to secure his survival. It is also revealed that a man named Brad has been charged for the arson attack of the Dagmar. Subsequently, Den is no longer wanted by the police.

== Charlie Cotton ==
Charlie Cotton, played by Christopher Hancock, is a recurring character, introduced in March 1986 as the estranged husband of Dot Cotton (June Brown). He appears in stints until producers made the decision to kill the character off-screen in 1991, to aid development of characters connected to him. June Brown was openly against the killing of Charlie. Charlie appears one last time, in October 2000, as an apparition, warning his son Nick to change his ways. Charlie comes and goes throughout his duration in the show; he is first seen 13 months after the soap's launch in 1986. Depicted as bigamous and a conman, Charlie typically reappears in the show whenever he needs money or temporary accommodation and, because of Dot's Christian ideals regarding forgiveness, Charlie always is permitted to return. According to Christopher Hancock, Charlie is "a truly revolting character, a loser" and the character has been described as a "despicable small-time villain [...] lazy and pathetic". Author Kate Lock has described Charlie as a "sly, shifty, weaselly man". To become the character of Charlie, Hancock wore stick-on sideburns.

== James Willmott-Brown ==
James Willmott-Brown, played by William Boyde, is an ex-army officer, arriving in Albert Square in March 1986 as the area manager for 'Luxford and Copley', the brewery that owns The Queen Victoria. By December, he decides to move to the square and buys Debbie Wilkins's (Shirley Cheriton) house at 43 Albert Square when she sells it following her fiancé, Andy's (Ross Davidson), death. He and Debbie later have a fling, but it doesn't progress into anything serious. Pat Wicks (Pam St. Clement) takes a shine to him and tries seducing him on several occasions, but is rebuffed each time. During the early years, he is friendly with Colin Russell (Michael Cashman).

== Vicki Fowler ==
Vicki Fowler, played by Emma Herry from the character's birth in 1986 to 1988, Samantha Leigh Martin from 1988 to 1995, and Scarlett Johnson from 2003 to 2004, is the daughter of Michelle Fowler (Susan Tully). The character is born in the serial, and was conceived in a controversial storyline about teenage pregnancy. Exploiting a whodunnit angle, at the time of the first showing, viewers were not initially told who was the father, and press interest in the fledgling show escalated as journalists attempted to guess. The audience finally discovered his identity in October 1985 in episode 66. Written by series co-creator/script-editor Tony Holland and directed by co-creator/producer Julia Smith, it was considered a landmark episode in the show's history. 4 possible suspects are seen leaving the Square early in the episode: Tony Carpenter (Oscar James), Ali Osman (Nejdet Salih), Andy O'Brien (Ross Davidson), and Den Watts (Leslie Grantham). As Michelle waits by their rendezvous point, a car pulls up and the fluffy white legs of the soap landlord's poodle Roly leap out of a car and give it all away: Den Watts is the father Michelle's baby. After this storyline the programme started to appear in newspaper cartoons as it moved more and more into the public mainstream. The character of Vicki was written out in 1995, after the actress who played Vicki's mother decided to leave the soap. After an 8-year absence, she was reintroduced by Executive Producer Louise Berridge in 2003 as a rebellious teenager.

== Carmel Jackson ==
Carmel Jackson (also Roberts), played by Judith Jacob, is a health visitor, introduced in a recurring, minor role in 1986. Producers saw potential in the character. Script writers were asked to develop more prominent storylines, and Carmel became a regular character. She is portrayed as a well-meaning, caring individual who is forever getting everyone's problems dumped on her. She is featured in storylines about domestic violence and various family and career upsets. Jacob remained in the role until 1989, when she opted to leave. Off-screen, the character has been the subject of criticism regarding the portrayal of her profession from the Health Visitors Association. In July 1984, before EastEnders went to air, the show's creators, Tony Holland and Julia Smith, attended an opening evening at the Anna Scher Theatre School in North London, to find actors for roles in their upcoming serial. According to Holland and Smith, Anna Scher's school was unlike many other drama schools, where students were "ironed out", all looking and sounding the same. At Anna Scher's school, students' natural personalities and accents were encouraged, "her students aren't taught how to act, they're helped to dig inside themselves and be." In Holland and Smith's own words, this was "just the sort of non-acting that [EastEnders] was looking for".

== Harry Reynolds ==
Harry Reynolds, played by Gareth Potter, is a college friend of Kelvin Carpenter (Paul J. Medford) who first appears along with Tessa Parker (Josephine Melville) in June 1986. Both Harry and Tessa have radical Marxist beliefs and it isn't long before they manage to recruit Kelvin to the same way of thinking.

== Tessa Parker ==
Tessa Parker, played by Josephine Melville, is a college friend of Kelvin Carpenter (Paul J. Medford) and Harry Reynolds (Gareth Potter) who first appears in June 1986. Both Harry and Tessa have radical Marxist beliefs and it isn't long before they manage to recruit Kelvin to the same way of thinking. Tessa soon discovers that she and Kelvin have more in common than their beliefs. She finds him attractive and they start dating.

== Pat Butcher ==
Pat Evans (also Wicks and Butcher) is played by Pam St. Clement from 1986 to 2012, with guest appearances in 2016 and 2025. Pat is also played by Emma Cooke in a soap 'bubble' Pat and Mo: Ashes to Ashes, delving into her past with sister-in-law Mo Harris (Laila Morse/Lorraine Stanley) which first aired in 2004. Pat is the third-longest-running character in the soap, coming after Ian Beale (Adam Woodyatt), who has featured in the soap since it first aired, and Dot Branning (June Brown). The character of Pat was conceived by the creators of EastEnders, Tony Holland and Julia Smith, in 1984. Although not one of the serial's original protagonists, Pat is referred to in the character outline of Pete Beale (Peter Dean), who appeared on-screen in EastEnders first episode, as written by Smith and Holland in their book, EastEnders: The Inside Story: "[Pete] married very young to Pat – it turned out to be a total disaster. They were too young, rushing into a difficult life for all the wrong reasons, and truthfully, [Pat] was a vicious shrew...[Pete] divorced [Pat] and married Kathy when he was 24...His two sons by his first marriage are nineteen and twenty and he hardly sees them..." On 7 July 2011, it was announced that St. Clement had quit EastEnders. The actress revealed that she wanted to try other things, saying "I have enjoyed 25 and a half wonderful years in EastEnders creating the character of Pat but feel it's time to hang up her earrings. Leaving the EastEnders 'family' will be akin to a bereavement. But I'm looking forward to the other work and life opportunities that I will have the time to pursue." Pat left later in the year and executive producer Bryan Kirkwood said her departure was a "fitting" storyline. Pat's son David Wicks (Michael French) returned for her departure.

== Eddie Hunter ==
Eddie Hunter, played by Simon Henderson, is a flamboyantly dressed friend of Simon Wicks (Nick Berry) and he is first seen in Albert Square in June 1986. Eddie and Simon were part of a band, and before Simon came to Walford, he had borrowed money from loan sharks and was left owing them huge amounts of money that he couldn't pay back. Eddie was happy to leave Simon with the debt and disappeared to work as a redcoat in Clacton, so the band dissolved. However, when the debts are finally repaid, Simon decides to regroup and he contacts Eddie to rejoin the band. The reformed group, known as "The Banned", consist of Simon, Eddie, Kelvin Carpenter (Paul J. Medford), Sharon Watts (Letitia Dean), Ian Beale (Adam Woodyatt) and Harry Reynolds (Gareth Potter). Eddie is the lead guitarist.

== Irene ==
Irene
- EastEnders character
- Portrayed by: Katherine Parr
- Duration: 1986–1987
- First appearance: Episode 144; 3 July 1986
- Last appearance: Episode 244; 16 June 1987
In-universe information
- Nephews: Lofty Holloway

Irene (credited as Aunty Irene), played by Katherine Parr, is the aunt of Lofty Holloway (Tom Watt) – his mother's sister. Lofty does not have a close relationship with his stern mother, but he dotes on his aunt Irene and she is the only relative he has contact with. Auntie Irene first appears in July 1986, when her nephew Lofty and his fiancée Michelle Fowler (Susan Tully) visit her in the nursing home where she lives. She has been told that she only had six months to live, as she has terminal cancer. She tells Michelle that she had been in love with a man in 1938, but he was killed in an accident and she had never married.

She attends Lofty and Michelle's wedding in September 1986, only to see her beloved nephew jilted at the altar. Later in the year Lofty and Michelle sort out their differences and finally get married. Irene worries that Michelle is merely using Lofty, but Michelle promises she will not hurt him. Satisfied, Irene gives their union her blessing and also pays for their honeymoon as a wedding gift.

Irene visits Lofty and Michelle in March 1987, giving Lofty instructions about her funeral. Irene worries that Lofty will not cope once she has gone and tries to make him accept that she will soon be dead. Lofty is distressed at the prospect of losing his aunt and cries into her lap. In June 1987 Lofty visits Irene at the hospital. She is in obvious pain and can no longer see. The following episode Lofty hears that his aunt has finally succumbed to the cancer that had been slowly killing her for years. He attends her funeral on 23 June 1987.

== Colin Russell ==
Colin Russell, played by Michael Cashman, is a middle-class yuppie described as an amiable chap with a kind heart who often ends up being used by the less considerate locals. He is Walford's first on-screen gay resident and when his sexuality is eventually revealed it causes shockwaves around the Square. Colin is EastEnders' first homosexual character. Introduced in August 1986, Colin was one of the more popular characters in the early years of the programme. At first the audience and the residents of Walford were kept in the dark about the fact that Colin was gay. This changed by the end of the year, at which time Colin acquired a young boyfriend named Barry Clark (Gary Hailes). Colin was one of the most controversial characters of his time – mainly because gay-orientated content was still relatively rare on prime-time television during the mid-1980s. Gay characters that existed were usually farcical, camp parodies, created purely for comic relief, such as Mr Humphries in the situation comedy, Are You Being Served?.

== Tom Clements ==
Tom Clements
- EastEnders character
- Portrayed by: Donald Tandy
- Duration: 1986–1988
- First appearance: Episode 159; 26 August 1986
- Last appearance: Episode 335; 21 April 1988
In-universe information
- Occupation: Potman

Tom Clements, played by Donald Tandy between 1986 and 1988, is an army war veteran. Tom is first seen in Albert Square in August 1986. He lives with his spinster sister in the council house at Number 25 Albert Square and he initially works for the council as custodian of the community centre. Tom accepts an offer to work as potman at The Queen Victoria public house. He is paid in pints and occasional cash-in-hand. He has an allotment and competes with Arthur Fowler (Bill Treacher) in the growing of leeks and marrows. Tom's leeks are damaged by Roly the dog, which Tom initially accuses Arthur of doing. Tom then takes Arthur's leeks and enters them into the Walford & District Allotment Society Show and wins first prize. After his sister dies, Tom seeks the female company of Dot Cotton (June Brown) and Pat Wicks (Pam St. Clement), but Dot remains faithful to her marriage vows and Pat thinks Tom is too old for her boisterous lifestyle. Later, Tom swaps lodgings with Dot and moves next door to the flat at Number 23A Albert Square. After feeling unwell, Tom stumbles into the pub toilets and dies of a heart attack on 21 April 1988. As he has no close relatives or friends surviving, Dot takes it upon herself to arrange his funeral and dispose of his personal belongings. She is named executor of his will, and is further shocked to find that Tom carried a small picture of her in his pocket. Dot asks Ian Beale (Adam Woodyatt) to cater for the wake. She is furious when she is the only one who attends Tom's funeral.

== Dr Singh ==
Dr Singh
- EastEnders character
- Portrayed by: Amerjit Deu
- Duration: 1986–1987
- First appearance: Episode 180; 6 November 1986
- Last appearance: Episode 303; 31 December 1987
In-universe information
- Occupation: General practitioner

Dr Jaggat Singh, played by Amerjit Deu, first arrives in Albert Square in November 1986. He is employed by Dr Harold Legg (Leonard Fenton) as a locum to cover the surgery for him several days a week.

Naima Jeffery (Shreela Ghosh) shows a romantic interest in Jaggat and they go on several dates. Naima's cousin Rezaul Kabir (Tanveer Ghani) is furious as Jaggat is a Sikh and Naima is Muslim, and he tries to provoke Jaggat into a fight in The Queen Victoria one night. However, Jaggat just laughs off Rezaul's aggression and they eventually become friends. In the end nothing serious ever develops between Jaggat and Naima anyway, as Naima ends the relationship to marry Farrukh – a suitor from Bangladesh.

Having Lou Beale (Anna Wing), Ethel Skinner (Gretchen Franklin) and Dot Cotton (June Brown) as patients sharpens his interest in the elderly and Jaggat leaves the Square in December 1987 for full-time work with old people in a Northern home. Shortly before leaving, he persuades Ethel to move into sheltered housing at Prosper Estate.

== Barry Clark ==
Barry Clark, played by Gary Hailes, is a cockney barrow-boy, and an unlikely partner for the gay, middle-class yuppie, Colin Russell (Michael Cashman). He is much younger than his middle-aged boyfriend and as such Colin's role is almost paternal. Barry is open about his sexuality to everyone except his volatile father – and when he is finally told he takes the news so badly that Barry turns straight just to appease him – although he is never very successful at it. Barry is one half of Walford's first homosexual couple. His boyfriend, Colin, had already been introduced to the show several months prior to Barry's arrival and he had proven to be an extremely popular addition to the cast. Both the audience and the residents of Walford had been kept in the dark about the fact that Colin was gay. This changed upon Barry's first scene on-screen, whereby the audience learnt that he had spent the night with Colin after picking him up the night before (off-screen) at a gay club. Colin and Barry were two of the most controversial characters of their time – mainly because gay-orientated content was still relatively rare on prime time television during the mid-1980s. Gay characters that existed were usually farcical camp parodies, created purely for comic relief, such as Mr. Humphries in the situation comedy, Are You Being Served?.

== Rezaul Kabir ==
Rezaul Kabir
- EastEnders character
- Portrayed by: Tanveer Ghani
- Duration: 1986–1988
- First appearance: Episode 190; 11 December 1986
- Last appearance: Episode 305; 7 January 1988
In-universe information
- Occupation: Shopkeeper
- First cousins: Naima Jeffery

Rezaul Kabir, played by Tanveer Ghani, arrives in Albert Square in December 1986. He is Naima Jeffery's (Shreela Ghosh) cousin and had been sent by Naima's family to help her run her grocery store, First Til Last. Naima is extremely angry about Rezaul's arrival, but her family are adamant that he has to stay, so she begrudgingly puts up with his presence. Rezaul is rather bossy, pretentious, chauvinistic and arrogant, and instantly tries to take over the running of the shop. On his first night, Rezaul puts forth a scheme to increase the shop's profits and asks for a month's trial. Naima agrees to the trial. Rezaul then proceeds to mark up the shop's items to unreasonably high prices as well as steal money from the till. Naima is furious and to make matters worse it soon becomes clear that Rezaul has amorous intentions towards her.

Naima isn't remotely interested in Rezaul so she sets about finding herself a new boyfriend to put him off. She starts dating the Square's new doctor, Jaggat Singh (Amerjit Deu). Rezaul, a Muslim, becomes very envious when he sees them together and tells Naima that she is making a fool of herself, smiling and fawning over a Sikh. This culminates in Rezaul trying to pick a fight with Dr. Singh in The Queen Victoria one night, almost getting himself barred in the process.

In April 1987, Naima and Rezaul get into a shouting match when he tells her that her family have decided she has to marry him. He is furious when she flatly refuses, but later admits that he is actually relieved and tells her he doesn't want to marry her either. Naima's defiance displeases her family and they subsequently break off all ties with her. Rezaul, it seems, is rather impressed with Naima and tells her that she is no ordinary Bengali girl as he'd first thought.

Things between Naima and Rezaul improve after this, and when Naima's family eventually send over another of her cousins for her to marry, he goes out of his way to help their blossoming romance. After Naima leaves England to live in Bangladesh, Rezaul runs The First Til Last in her place for a while. Whilst managing the shop, he catches Charlie Cotton (Christopher Hancock) shoplifting and makes a citizen's arrest. Charlie then has to appear at the Magistrates' Court and is given a £50 fine. When Naima's family sell the shop to Ashraf Karim (Aftab Sachak) at the end of the year, Rezaul leaves Walford to resume his studies. His last appearance is in January 1988.

== Others ==
Character	Date(s)	Actor	Circumstances
Mrs Woods	16 January–22 May (4 episodes)	Jennie Lee	A social worker assigned to pregnant Michelle Fowler.
Beresford	21–30 January	Winston Crooke	Members of the gang known as The Firm, targeting people for protection money, mostly Naima Jeffrey, Ali and Sue Osman and Tony Carpenter. Tony is able to fight off Beresford but several weeks later is menaced in the market.
Vic (aka "The Crusher")	21–30 January	Peter Corey	Members of the gang known as The Firm, targeting people for protection money, mostly Naima Jeffrey, Ali and Sue Osman and Tony Carpenter. Tony is able to fight off Beresford but several weeks later is menaced in the market.
Neville Agard	28 January	Gordon Case	A corporate lawyer who is in a relationship with Hannah Carpenter. Hannah and her daughter, Cassie Carpenter, live with Neville, but Cassie tells her father, Tony Carpenter, that Neville spanked her, but when Tony finds out she was looking for Christmas presents, he opines that Neville was right to spank her. Cassie later has a broken arm and tells Tony she fell but admits to Kelvin that Neville pushed her; when Tony threatens violence against Neville, Cassie goes back to saying it was an accident. Neville's only appearance is when Tony meets him and he insists that Cassie was injured in a fall and Cassie admits that she slipped while trying to get away from being smacked. Hannah still plans to marry Neville, but arrives in Walford in tears one day with Cassie and tells Tony that Neville was about to hit Cassie with a riding crop. Cassie reveals that he has hit her with the crop before and that her broken arm was not an accident. Tony confronts Neville off-screen and returns home with Hannah and Cassie's belongings and a cut lip but refuses to say what happened.
"Uncle"	13 February 1986– 28 July 1988 (6 episodes)	Leonard Maguire	A Jewish pawnbroker and friend of Albert and Lou Beale from the Second World War years, whose real name is never mentioned. He is a semi-regular character and his first appearance on screen is in February 1986, when he visits Lou after 20 years to return Albert's watch, which Lou had recently given to her grandson, Simon Wicks. Simon had pawned it to pay loan sharks after he borrowed £1,500 for his failed band and after he could pay no more, he came to Walford to hide from them. However, they followed him and he was subsequently forced to pay twice that amount. While Lou's son-in-law Arthur Fowler is in prison, Uncle loans his wife Pauline money and he later helps Lou with her will. Uncle appears again on Christmas Day 1987 and reminisies with Lou, Ethel Skinner, Dot Cotton and Doctor Legg about Christmases during the Second World War. He also brings a Christmas present for Lou. Uncle makes his penultimate appearance just prior to Lou's death, when she leaves him a pair of old spectacles. His last appearance is in July 1988 when he attends Lou's funeral. "Uncle" is an East End nickname for a pawnbroker.
Wilf	4 March 1986 – 16 July 1987 (4 episodes)	Uncredited	A member of The Firm and a colleague of Brad Williams. They take money from the café and shop and threaten Tony Carpenter and his children. Later, Wilf arrives at the Queen Vic with Brad disguised as gas men under the pretence of dealing with Den Watts's cooker. Actually they are there to get Trevor Smith out of the Vic and away to safety. Trevor changes clothes with Wilf, so Trevor leaves as one of the Gas Men, while Wilf remains upstairs for several hours to make it look right. Wilf returns in July 1987 with Brad as they have a task for Den, which involves Den having to travel immediately to Morocco to pick up some "gear" on behalf of the Firm, which Den then has to bring back to the UK. Den is promised that payment by the Firm will be enough to clear Den's large debts with the brewery and the bank.
Mr Pavasars	11–13 March (2 episodes)	Sydney Arnold	A lonely Latvian man who purchases Willy from a pet shop after he goes missing. One evening DS Quick spots Mr Pavasars walking Willy and takes Ethel Skinner, (Willy's real owner), to Mr Pavasars the following day to try and get Willy back. Mr Pavasars says the dog is called Rasputin and Lou Beale, who has also come along with DS Quick and Ethel offers Mr Pavasars money for Willy, after which, Ethel brings Willy home.
Jill	13 March	Beth Ellis	A marriage guidance counsellor who Angie Watts has been visiting. Angie's husband, Den Watts, visits her to let her know that Angie cannot make her scheduled appointment. Whilst there, Den opens up to her about his relationship with Angie and his mistress, Jan Hammond.
Paula	25 March	Uncredited	A customer in the café.
Mrs Andrews	10 April	Uncredited	A customer at the fruit and veg stall on the market.
Nigel Dean	17 April	Anthony Jackson	A carpet salesman who visits Pauline Fowler and her mother Lou Beale with carpet samples and they decide on a carpet to buy. Later, Nigel is in The Queen Victoria pub and engages Lofty Holloway in gambling in a card game. Lofty wins £1, so Ali Osman, who says he knows it is a con but knows how the con works, gambles with Nigel. Initially Ali keeps winning, but then starts losing. Ali then raises the stakes to £5, but Ali accuses Nigel of cheating and using a hidden card. Pete Beale finds the hidden card, and Sharon Watts breaks up their fight herself and throws Nigel out of the Vic. Nigel attempts to take the pot of money accumulated by the gambling, but Ali does not let him.
George	1 May	Uncredited	A man delivering beer barrels to Den Watts along with his unnamed colleague (played by Martyn Whitby), who offers Den an extra barrel for cash at half price. Den agrees, so he asks George to put the extra barrel in the basement of The Queen Victoria pub.
Mr Gill	6–8 May (2 episodes)	Raymond Brody	Mr Gill, although he is never named on screen, first appears in Naima Jeffrey's shop. He at first appears to be very friendly and compliments her on her shop's recent conversion. The atmosphere suddenly changes when Mr Gill tells Naima she has already had a visit from two of his representatives Beresford and Victor. It becomes clear very quickly that Mr Gill is there to obtain more protection money from Naima, although Mr Gill is more subtle about it. Mr Gill tells Naima that it would be terrible if there was fire in the shop, especially soon soon after the conversion. Naima is terrified when Mr Gill tells her that her business would suffer if Naima were to be permanently disabled. Naima eventually hands Mr Gill a wad of notes and he leaves. Later Naima speaks to Pete Beale and Kathy Beale on their stall while observing Mr Gill from distance and asks them if they recognise him. Pete says he does not know Mr Gill, but Kathy says she does know Mr Gill and so does Pete if he'll stop to think about it. Kathy tells Naima that Mr Gill is part of The Firm, that threatened Naima previously. Kathy says that Mr Gill is a lot closer to the top of the pile. Mr Gill next appears in the Vic and asks for Dennis Watts, who is not in. Mr Gill has a scotch, which is on the house at the behest of Angie Watts, as both she and Mr Gill know who each other are. Mr Gill doesn't leave a message for Den and tells Angie that he will be in touch. Mr Gill next appears in the Cafe and speaks to Sue Osman. He tells Sue that "Jasper Scannell sent me Mrs Osman. To have you fill an envelope". Sue challenges Mr Gill saying that she thought that that game was over. Mr Gill replies that it is over and that this is a new game called Double Your Money. Mr Gill next arrives in the Vic and encounters Angie. Mr Gill has a message for Den from Den's 'cousin', but Den is in the bath. Mr Gill refuses to leave Angie a message for Den and sits down at the bar saying he will wait for Den. After this Mr Gill is not seen again.
Mr Makepeace	8 May	John Grillo	Dot Cotton's bank manager, who she meets to talk about cheques of hers that have been cashed by someone else. He explains that cheques can be stolen by removing them from a chequebook at irregular intervals so they go unnoticed and that the cheques were cashed because the person presenting the cheques chose young and inexperienced cashiers who do not know who 'D Cotton' is, but says a fifth cheque was presented to a cashier who knows Dot. He describes the person who presented the cheque, and it matches the description of her son, Nick Cotton.
Trevor Smith	8–15 May (3 episodes)	George Irving	Wanted by the police for the armed robbery of a bank in Walford, Trevor has the protection of the East End criminal organisation known as The Firm. They contact publican, Den Watts, and instruct him to hide Trevor in his pub for several days, to escape the police. Den is against this, but he has little choice in the matter. When Trevor arrives he tries to take over and intimidates Den's wife, Angie Watts, and daughter, Sharon Watts, and also unnerves Den. Den tries to stand up to him but it has no effect as Den and Trevor do not get on. After Trevor leaves, a bet on the horses that Trevor had Den put down on his behalf wins and Den keeps the winnings of over £1200 for himself. It is later reported in the local newspaper that Trevor has been arrested in Basingstoke. DS Quick is suspicious since the police thought that Trevor was hiding in Walford and the arrest occurred due to a tip off the police received from someone in Walford. Later Den talks privately to Michelle Fowler and implies that he provided the tip off about Trevor.
Lizzie Burton	29 May	Sharon D. Clarke	A woman on the maternity ward along with Michelle Fowler who is having her fourth child. Michelle asks Lizzie if she had ever contemplated life with her children but without her husband. Lizzie says she had thought about it, but it scared her too much to dwell upon it.
Elaine	5 June	Michele Winstanley	A single mother on Michelle Fowler's maternity ward. She gave both her children up for adoption, and tells Michelle she is arrogant for thinking she can bring up a baby on her own.
Mr Adcock	17 June	Sebastian Abineri	An officer from the DHSS who comes to assess Debbie Wilkins to see if she is eligible for Social Security. Debbie prepares for his visit by labelling everything in the house separately between her and her former partner, Andy O'Brien, to prove they are not cohabiting as partners, as Debbie is claiming unemployment benefit. Mr Adcock first encounters Debbie in Naima Jeffrey's shop where she works, but neither he nor Debbie know who each other are. When he arrives at her home, he says he thinks he recognises her, but cannot remember from where. Debbie says Andy still lives in her home. Andy arrives and has a bag of laundry, and Mr Adcock sees a shop uniform in the bag. Mr Adcock then remembers Naima wearing the uniform and wonders if Debbie was wearing one as well. Debbie and Andy simultaneously give different explanations. Mr Adcock then continues the interview.
Dave	24 June	Christopher Karallis	A guitarist who auditions for the band that Simon Wicks, Kelvin Carpenter, Sharon Watts, Ian Beale and Harry Reynolds are forming. Dave plays the guitar badly and Harry rejects him.
Johnny Earthquake	24 June	G.B. (Zoot) Money	A man who auditions for the band that Simon Wicks, Kelvin Carpenter, Sharon Watts, Ian Beale and Harry Reynolds are forming. Johnny says he was once in a band called "Johnny Earthquake and the Tremors". His age puts Sharon off but they agree to give him a fair chance. He brings his own alcohol and performs "Be-Bop-A-Lula". The members of the band are unimpressed with Johnny's audition, his drinking and his sexist attitude, so he is asked to leave.
DC Dunningham	10 July	Uncredited	A detective constable who accompanies WPC Alison Howard when she visits Sue Osman to ask where her husband, Ali Osman, is, as he may know something about Dr Legg's stolen car.
Owen Hughes	22–31 July (4 episodes)	Philip Brook	Mark Fowler's Welsh friend who comes to Albert Square with Mark after they worked together on a farm in Wales. He is first seen sleeping rough in the Fowlers' doorway with Mark, waiting for the family to wake up and let them in. Mark's father, Arthur Fowler, is fascinated by Owen's strange conversations about marrows, and he also talks constantly about the band Pink Floyd. Mark and Owen stay with Lofty Holloway in his flat, but he complains about Owen's body odour. Owen and Mark are soon hounded out of Albert Square by Tony Carpenter, after he discovers his 11-year-old daughter Cassie Carpenter smoking cannabis, which she stole from Owen. They leave in a hurry on Owen's motorbike and Owen is never seen again.
Sam	14 August	Uncredited	A boy who runs out into the street after his ball, while his mother (played by Carol Harrison) attends to his brother, Joey. Sam runs out into the path of an oncoming truck and is saved by Andy O'Brien. Andy is knocked over by the truck and is killed.
Mr Barry	14–21 August (2 episodes)	Uncredited	The truck driver who causes Andy O'Brien's death. He arrives to apologise to Andy's fiancée, Debbie Wilkins, to say how bad he feels about it but this only makes Debbie angry and she orders him to leave. The character's face is not seen in his second appearance.
Staff Nurse Sandra Marsh	19 August	Érin Geraghty	A nurse who works at the same hospital as Andy O'Brien. After Andy dies, she appears at the home of Andy's fiancée, Debbie Wilkins, telling her that Andy was an organ donor and he has saved somebody's life. She also explains that she identified Andy's body and contacted his parents in Glasgow to inform them of his death. She is credited as Staff Nurse Marsh.
Ronnie	26 August	Uncredited	A woman who leads Pauline Fowler's creative expression classes.
Sam Sangers	4 September	Alan Ford	A conman who tries to con Debbie Wilkins out of her deceased boyfriend, Andy O'Brien's possessions, until Pauline Fowler gets involved and sends him away.
Monty Kreitman	16 September	Charles Rea	A solicitor who is blackmailed by Dr Legg to handle Dot Cotton's shoplifting case.
Wally Ashton	18 September	Unknown	Wally Ashton is a local councillor who appears on the judging panel at The Queen Victoria for a 'Glamorous Granny' competition. Sicily Barnes and Sonia Marples are competitors. Wally and his fellow judges, Dr Legg and James Willmott-Brown, declare Pauline Fowler the winner, Sicily second and Sonia third place. Sicily gets a trophy for coming second, and the compère, Den Watts, comments on Sicily's gold-coloured jacket. Sonia wins a bottle of wine.
Sonia Marples	18 September	Unknown	Wally Ashton is a local councillor who appears on the judging panel at The Queen Victoria for a 'Glamorous Granny' competition. Sicily Barnes and Sonia Marples are competitors. Wally and his fellow judges, Dr Legg and James Willmott-Brown, declare Pauline Fowler the winner, Sicily second and Sonia third place. Sicily gets a trophy for coming second, and the compère, Den Watts, comments on Sicily's gold-coloured jacket. Sonia wins a bottle of wine.
Sicily Barnes	18 September	Unknown	Wally Ashton is a local councillor who appears on the judging panel at The Queen Victoria for a 'Glamorous Granny' competition. Sicily Barnes and Sonia Marples are competitors. Wally and his fellow judges, Dr Legg and James Willmott-Brown, declare Pauline Fowler the winner, Sicily second and Sonia third place. Sicily gets a trophy for coming second, and the compère, Den Watts, comments on Sicily's gold-coloured jacket. Sonia wins a bottle of wine.
The Reverend Hodges	25 September – 2 October (3 episodes)	Vincent Pickering	The vicar who is due to conduct Michelle Fowler and Lofty Holloway's wedding ceremony, but Michelle jilts Lofty. The Reverend Hodges visits Michelle in the aftermath and offers support but Michelle tells him that she is handling everything and asks him to leave. He also visits Lofty to offer support and Lofty questions God's role with regard to how events at the wedding unfolded.
Mr Grant	9–28 October (2 episodes)	Graeme Eton	A psychiatrist who Angie Watts goes to see having been referred by Dr Legg following results of tests that show liver damage due to excessive alcohol consumption. Angie discusses her drinking problem and her reasons for drinking. Angie visits Mr Grant a second time and tells him that she has stopped drinking and that she has now got everything she ever wanted out of her marriage. Angie then gets very upset and reveals to Mr Grant that all this happening because she has lied to her husband, Den Watts, and has told him that she is dying.
Justine	30 October	Alisa Bosschaert	Justine is a prostitute who turns up at the café looking for Ali Osman. She was ordered to arrive at the Café as she was told that she and Ali would have a date. When questioned by Ali and Sue Osman, Justine says she gets all sorts of calls and demands and describes herself as "very much a social service". It finally dawns on Justine that the call that she received was a hoax. Sue and Ali know that Mary Smith was behind the hoax call, which is part of her revenge scheme against Ali and particularly Mehmet Osman. Justine then goes to The Queen Victoria, where she meets a lorry driver and his co-worker, Bri, and three Chinese men, all of whom were sent to the café as pranks, and she joins them for a drink. Alisa Bosschaert is uncredited in this episode.
Adele	6 November	Lisa Lancashire	Adele and Gina are girls that Kelvin Carpenter knows and he tells Ian Beale about them and invites them to his home. Adele quickly rebuffs Kelvin's advances and rejects his offer of alcohol, saying she knows about his amorous reputation. Kelvin's father, Tony Carpenter arrives home and Kelvin introduces Adele to him. Tony then finds Ian and Gina kissing in the kitchen.
Gina	6 November	Charlotte Edwards	Adele and Gina are girls that Kelvin Carpenter knows and he tells Ian Beale about them and invites them to his home. Adele quickly rebuffs Kelvin's advances and rejects his offer of alcohol, saying she knows about his amorous reputation. Kelvin's father, Tony Carpenter arrives home and Kelvin introduces Adele to him. Tony then finds Ian and Gina kissing in the kitchen.
DS West	11 November 1986 – 5 January 1989	Leonard Gregory	A police officer who investigates the report of a burglary at 45 Albert Square and interviews the Fowler family. The following day, he and his colleague PC Gifford take Arthur Fowler to the police station where they question him for five hours until Arthur admits to staging the burglary to cover his crime of stealing his Christmas Club's money to pay for his daughter Michelle Fowler's wedding. West then formally arrests Arthur, who is shocked by this as he never expected to be arrested. West is present at Arthur's trial in May 1987, where it is questioned by Arthur's solicitor about how Arthur cooperated when he was arrested. Arthur sentenced to 28 days' imprisonment for the theft. The following week, West apologises to Arthur's wife, Pauline Fowler, at Debbie Wilkins and Terry Rich's engagement party. West investigates money laundering at the Queen Vic and questions Frank Butcher (Mike Reid) and Pat Wicks (Pam St. Clement) about the thousands of pounds going through the pub's till. West then speaks to previous landlord Den Watts (Leslie Grantham) about the matter. Following the arson on the Dagmar, West continually visits Den Watts on remand at Dickens Hill in order to press him for further information, to which Den is resistant to volunteer.
Mrs McCabe	11 November	Yvonne Gilan	A woman works for The Samaritans and interviews Kathy Beale, who wants to volunteer for the charity. During the interview, Kathy answers her questions by opening up about her being raped at the age of 14, telling her what would make her a good listener and why she wants to volunteer.
PC Gifford	13 November – 16 December	Albert Welling	A police officer who is present while Arthur Fowler waits at the police station to talk to DS West about a burglary at his home. Arthur makes small talk with a largely silent Gifford who notices Arthur becoming increasingly stressed during the interview. Several weeks later, Gifford arrives at The Queen Vic and warns Den Watts about people pedalling dodgy merchandise on the market at the precise moment when Mandy, a contact of Den's, is about to bring boxes of cassette tapes into the pub to be sold. Den and Simon Wicks fabricate a story that the side door is stuck when Mandy knocks the door and Den asks Gifford to help him open it and they exit through the front door, buying enough time for Simon to let Mandy into the pub. Den tells Gifford the door has a habit of sticking and unsticking. Gifford leaves but before he does he tells Den to tell Mandy he will catch up with her later and that she ought to get herself a new van.
Dario Chimisso	18–20 November (2 episodes)	Marino Mase	An Italian lawyer who takes Jan Hammond to Venice, Italy, to attend the wedding of Dario's sister. Dario and Jan were once lovers but she ended their relationship when his parents wanted them to marry, though Dario hopes to rekindle their romance. In Venice, Jan accidentally bumps into Den Watts, from whom she has recently split; he is there on a second honeymoon with his wife Angie Watts. Den is jealous of Jan's friendship with Dario, even though she claims it is platonic on her part. However, in August 1987, Jan sends Den a letter informing him that she and Dario had got married on a gondola in Venice. This news upsets Den, although it amuses his ex-wife, Angie.
Gavin	25 November	Nick Orchard	A steward on the Orient Express, who serves Den Watts and Angie Watts when they board the train in Venice and during their entire journey, during their second honeymoon.
Mandy	16 December	Uncredited	A contact of Den Watts's who brings cassette tapes to The Queen Victoria for him to sell.
Eamon	30 December	Aaron Harris	A customer in The Queen Victoria who Pat Wicks points out to Mary Smith, saying that he is quite shy and telling her that if she sits with him, Eamon will probably buy her a drink and maybe her dinner. Mary sits with him and he offers her a drink. Later, when Mary suggests that Eamon come back to her flat he is reluctant. He tells her that he would like to see her again and gives her some money and tells her to buy herself something nice. Mary confirms to Pat that Eamon paid for her dinner.
