= Karim family =

- EastEnders family
- First appearance: Episode 255; 23 July 1987
- Last appearance: Episode 561; 21 June 1990
- Created by: Tony Holland and Julia Smith
- Introduced by: Julia Smith
- Duration: 1987–1990

The Karims are a fictional family that appear in the BBC soap opera EastEnders between July 1987 and June 1990.

== Creation and development ==
The Muslim Karim family are introduced as the owners of the soap's grocery store, the First til Last, following the departure of the character Naima Jeffery (Shreela Ghosh) in 1987, who runs the business since EastEnders' inception in February 1985.

The family includes father Ashraf Karim (Aftab Sachak), his wife Sufia (Rani Singh) and their two teenage children, eldest daughter Shireen (Nisha Kapur) and son Sohail (Ronnie Jhutti). The head of the family, Ashraf, is scripted as the second cousin of original character Saeed Jeffery (Andrew Johnson), who departs the serial in December 1985. A character named Ashraf Jeffrey appears briefly in July 1987, described as the brother of Saeed who owns the property above Naima and Saeed's shop; he comes to inform the occupants, Sue and Ali Osman (Sandy Ratcliff and Nejdet Salih), that he is selling the property. Ashraf at this time is played by Tony Wredden, but although he is referred to as Saeed's brother in this instance, when the character returns, played by Sachak, he is described as Saeed's second cousin. Various serial-accompanying, BBC books have since ignored the original description of Ashraf as Saeed's brother when retelling the character's history, assimilating his as a Karim from his first appearance. For instance, in an extract from the 1991 EastEnders Handbook, author Hilary Kingsley writes, "Sue and Ali learn they may be evicted by Saeed's cousin, Ashraf Karim, because the flat is to be sold." Whilst in EastEnders Who's Who, published in 2000, author Kate Lock lists Ashraf Karim's first appearance as July 1987, indicating that both Ashrafs were the same character with their backstory subsequently altered in the serial.

Collectively, the family were introduced by producer Mike Gibbon early in 1988. Scriptwriter Colin Brake has written in his book, EastEnders: The First Ten Years, that 1988 was a year of big change, "The year began in the way it intended to go on—with change. During January, Asraf [and his wife] Sufia took over the foodstore".

Ashraf has been described as heavy-handed, serious-minded and stern, while the children have been described as bright, Sohail "sneaky" and Shireen "pretty". Storylines concentrate on racial difficulties and Ashraf's struggles to maintain Muslim ideologies in his children's lives, while they are identifying with Western culture. A love triange storyline is integrated into the Karims' marriage in 1989, when Ashraf is revealed to be having a long-running affair with a white woman named Stella (Cindy O'Callaghan), causing many family problems. The culmination of this storyline sees the departure of the Karims in June 1990; they were among many to be axed by executive producer Michael Ferguson. It has been reported that the fate of Sufia was originally scripted differently. Prior to Ferguson's introduction, Gibbon had recruited writer David Yallop to devise ways to kill various members of the cast based, he claims, on their portrayer's acting ability. According to Yallop, Gibbon had agreed that Sufia would be gunned-down and killed in a shotgun raid. The plot never came to fruition, as Gibbon was demoted as head producer and then resigned.

== Family tree ==
second cousins
Ashraf Karim | Sufia | Saeed Jeffery
Shireen Karim | Sohail Karim

== Ashraf Karim ==
Ashraf Karim
- EastEnders character
- Portrayed by: Tony Wredden (1987); Aftab Sachak (1988–1990)
- Duration: 1987-90
- First appearance: Episode 255; 23 July 1987
- Last appearance: Episode 561; 21 June 1990
In-universe information
- Occupation: Shop proprietor
- Wife: Sufia Karim
- Sons: Sohail Karim
- Daughters: Shireen Karim
- Other relatives: Saeed Jeffery; Farrukh Jeffery

Ashraf Karim, played by Tony Wredden in 1987 and Aftab Sachak from 1988 to 1990, came to Britain from Bangladesh in 1968 and was already betrothed to Sufia (Rani Singh), who was still a child in Bangladesh. Before he returned to Bangladesh to be married to Sufia, he met and had a fling with Stella (Cindy O'Callaghan), a young hippy, and their relationship continued on and off after Sufia emigrated to Britain to be with her husband in 1973. Sufia knew about Stella, and suspected other affairs and found them all distressing.

In the beginning, Ashraf worked in a car manufacturing plant in the Midlands. Later on, relatives in Walford East London offered him a job in one of their corner shops and he, Sufia and their two small children, Shireen (Nisha Kapur) and Sohail (Ronnie Jhutti), came south to live. He saved enough money to open a business of his own, although racist taunts and attacks made life difficult for him. Even so, by putting in long hours he finally made a success of running his third shop in Walford High Street.

Ashraf is the second cousin of Saeed Jeffery (Andrew Johnson) and upon Saeed's return to Bangladesh in 1985 he takes over ownership of the flat above the Jeffery's grocery store, First Til Last. Ashraf first appears in July 1987, when he comes to inform the tenants, Sue and Ali Osman (Sandy Ratcliff and Nejdet Salih), that he is selling the flat. Ali wants to buy it but cannot afford it and so the flat is sold to Alan McIntyre (Pip Miller). In January 1988, Ashraf employs cousins in his shop in Walford, which leaves him free to buy and run First Til Last in Bridge Street, which is owned by Saeed's wife Naima (Shreela Ghosh) and has been run by her cousin Rezaul Kabir (Tanveer Ghani) until the Karims' arrival. The Karims then move into a house in Victoria Road, which was previously owned by the hairdresser, Julie Cooper (Louise Plowright) and Ashraf sends his two children to private school.

The first thing Ashraf does is hire Arthur Fowler (Bill Treacher) to work at the First Til Last. However problems arise when Arthur manages to offend one of their Asian customers by including a meat product in her delivery. Ashraf decides to punish Arthur by giving him the humiliating task of being the paper delivery boy. After much teasing from the Walford residents Arthur dumps the papers without delivering them, causing many angry complaints from irate customers. Ashraf then decides that Arthur has to write each customer a letter of apology and personally deliver them, further humiliating him. Animosity between the pair only worsens and by July that year Arthur is sacked.

The Karims keep themselves to themselves, and Ashraf is particularly protective of his daughter, Shireen. He becomes extremely concerned when she starts spending a lot of time with Ricky Butcher (Sid Owen) and he tries to nip their blossoming relationship in the bud. However Shireen continues to see Ricky behind his back and when her brother, Sohail, reveals the relationship, Ashraf is furious. He bans her from seeing him and bans Ricky from his shop. Ashraf decides that the only way to stop her from fraternising with undesirable men is to marry her off to an eligible Muslim suitor - much to Shireen's dismay. Muslim culture dictates that betrothed women must be virgins before marrying and so in the light of her dalliance with Ricky, Ashraf decides that Shireen has to have a virginity test performed. He marches her off to Dr. Harold Legg (Leonard Fenton) and demands that he performs one, but is refused. Ashraf becomes incensed at Dr Legg's refusal and is even more enraged when he has the audacity to suggest that he should put aside his traditional values and embrace western ones.

In November 1989 Sufia discovers that Ashraf is still carrying on with his mistress, Stella. Sufia decides to pack her things and threatens to leave. However Ashraf manages to talk her into staying and promises that his affair is over, which is true as Stella had grown tired of being his mistress and ended their relationship. Ashraf sets about arranging a marriage for his daughter. Despite Shireen's misgivings she is actually pleasantly surprised when she meets her suitor, Jabbar Ahmed (Gordon Warnecke) and they become genuinely attached. Meanwhile, Ashraf manages to talk Stella into reigniting their affair and he regularly sneaks away to be with her. Sometime later, though, Jabbar's uncle Parvez (Mohammed Ashiq) spots Ashraf with Stella, in a restaurant, and realises the Karim family are not as honourable as they seem. The Ahmed's cancel the engagement and Shireen is left mystified and upset, while Sufia feels angry and betrayed at Ashraf's renewed adultery. Ashraf then decides that the only solution is to leave their shop in the hands of his cousins and move the family to Bristol. Before they leave, Shireen's mother and the women of Jabbar's family help the young couple to meet secretly to keep the engagement going. Whether it took place or not is never stated as the Karims leave town soon after. The Karims' last appearance is in June 1990.

== Sufia Karim ==
Sufia Karim
- EastEnders character
- Portrayed by: Rani Singh
- Duration: 1988–1990
- First appearance: Episode 306; 12 January 1988
- Last appearance: Episode 561; 21 June 1990
In-universe information
- Occupation: Shop proprietor
- Husband: Ashraf Karim
- Sons: Sohail Karim
- Daughters: Shireen Karim

Sufia Karim, played by Rani Singh, married her husband Ashraf (Aftab Sachak) in an arranged marriage. He was older than her, and moved to Britain in 1968, when she was a child still living in Bangladesh. They married in Bangladesh and moved to Britain in 1973, and had two children; Sohail (Ronny Jhutti) and Shireen (Nisha Kapur).

Sufia makes her first appearance in the serial in 1988, when she moves to Walford with her family.

In 1989 she discovers that Ashraf is having an affair with a woman named Stella (Cindy O'Callaghan). Sufia decides to leave Ashraf, but he talks her round and she stays, as Ashraf and Stella's relationship had ended.

Ashraf and Sufia arrange a marriage for their daughter Shireen with a man named Jabbar Ahmed (Gordon Warnecke). Ashraf has started seeing Stella again, and Jabbar's family find out about his infidelity and call off the engagement. Sufia and Jabbar's mother help Jabbar and Shireen to secretly continue with the engagement as they have fallen in love. The Karims leave Walford to live in Bristol in June 1990.

== Shireen Karim ==
Shireen Karim
- EastEnders character
- Portrayed by: Nisha Kapur
- Duration: 1988–1990
- First appearance: Episode 352; 21 June 1988
- Last appearance: Episode 561; 21 June 1990
In-universe information
- Occupation: Student
- Father: Ashraf Karim
- Mother: Sufia Karim
- Brothers: Sohail Karim

Shireen Karim, played by Nisha Kapur, moves to Walford as a teenager in 1988, and grows friendly with the Butcher children, Diane (Sophie Lawrence) and Ricky (Sid Owen). She and Ricky begin dating for a brief period, until Shireen's stern father Ashraf (Aftab Sachak) finds out and forbids her from seeing Ricky. Ashraf then decides that Shireen will enter an arranged marriage, and he humiliates his daughter further by requesting that Dr Harold Legg (Leonard Fenton) perform a vaginal examination on his daughter, to confirm she is still a virgin; Dr Legg refuses. Ashraf removes Shireen from the local comprehensive and puts her in a boarding school to keep her away from undesirables. Shireen dislikes it so much that she runs away announcing she is being bullied by racists, so Ashraf removes her from the school.

Shireen has a brief date with Trevor Short (Phil McDermott) in 1989, but this ultimately leads nowhere as Shireen is betrothed to Jabbar Ahmed (Gordon Warnecke). Although Shireen is opposed to the idea of an arranged marriage, when she meets Jabbar she changes her mind. She falls in love with her suitor and is devastated when the marriage is called off due to the Ahmed family finding out about Ashraf's extra-marital affair with a white mistress. Before the Karims move away to Bristol, the women of the Karim and Ahmed families meet in secret, to discuss the possibility of Shireen and Jabbar marrying. Whether they reunite or not is not revealed, as the Karims leave Walford shortly after.

== Sohail Karim ==
Sohail Karim
- EastEnders character
- Portrayed by: Ronny Jhutti
- Duration: 1988–1990
- First appearance: Episode 354; 28 June 1988
- Last appearance: Episode 561; 21 June 1990
In-universe information
- Occupation: Student
- Father: Ashraf Karim
- Mother: Sufia Karim
- Sisters: Shireen Karim

Sohail Karim, played by Ronny Jhutti, arrives in 1988 and takes a liking to Diane Butcher (Sophie Lawrence). He tries to blackmail her into dating him, by threatening to expose his sister Shireen's (Nisha Kapur) secret relationship with Diane's brother Ricky (Sid Owen). Diane agrees until Sohail tries to molest her, and after the date ends abruptly, Sohail informs his father Ashraf (Aftab Sachak) about Shireen and Ricky.

Sohail later rebels against his father's heavy-handed manner, and reacts badly when he discovers that his father is having an affair. Sohail, along with the rest of his family, moves to Bristol in 1990.

== Reception ==
In 2003, Steve Pratt from The Northern Echo suggested that the Karim family were forgettable: "Few but the most fanatical soap fans will remember Albert Square's Karim family. They stayed in EastEnders for two years at the end of the 1980s, but were quickly forgotten after moving to Bristol in the wake of an arranged marriage that went wrong." He used the characters as an example of tokenism, negative stereotyping and a simplistic portrayal of ethnic minority communities in the UK, partly due to their installation as the owners of the soap's corner shop grocery store, typically associated with Asians in the UK.
