= Roly =

EastEnders character

- EastEnders character
- Portrayed by: Roly
- Duration: 1985–1993
- First appearance: Episode 1 "Poor Old Reg"; 19 February 1985
- Last appearance: Episode 909; 19 October 1993
- Species: Dog
- Breed: Standard poodle
In-universe information
- Owners: Den Watts; Sharon Watts; Frank Butcher; Mo Butcher; Pat Butcher; Grant Mitchell; Eddie Royle

Roly is a fictional dog from the BBC soap opera EastEnders. Roly is an apricot coloured standard poodle, who appears in the first episode of the programme on 19 February 1985 and remained in the show until 19 October 1993.

== Casting ==
Roly was cast less than a week before the filming of EastEnders began. From the beginning it was decided that the occupants of The Queen Victoria public house, Den, Angie and Sharon Watts, were to have a German Shepherd named Prince. However, finding an Alsatian that was light enough in colour not to merge into the background of the set proved to be difficult. Eventually, the co-creator/producer of the show, Julia Smith, was contacted by a company named Janimals, who specialised in providing and training animals for television and films. They had found a seven-month-old Poodle, called Roly, who might still be young enough to be trained. Training was said to take three weeks, and as the Poodle was a similar size to an Alsatian, Roly got the part. Roly was made the property of the BBC, given an ID card, and taken to live with Julia Smith at her home in London. Roly and Willy the pug shared a dressing room at Elstree studios. Smith hired a dog-sitter to care for Roly when she moved to Spain to create the soap opera Eldorado.

Roly departed the show in 1993. Off-screen, the real Roly was getting too old to appear regularly on television, so it was decided that he should retire to live with Julia Smith. On 2 August 1995, Roly died following an operation for breathing problems aggravated by the 1995 heatwave.

== Storylines ==
Roly was given to Sharon Watts (Letitia Dean) by her father, Den (Leslie Grantham). Sharon's mother, Angie (Anita Dobson), does not like the dog much and once even accuses him of deliberately causing her to trip and fall on the stairs. However, during Den and Angie's divorce in 1987, Angie is horrified to hear that Den is considering selling Roly. She storms round to The Queen Victoria public house and demands that Den give Roly to her.

Roly is involved in many storylines during his time in the show. He is often used by his owners as a silent sounding board, and is made privy to all their secrets and woes. It is Roly who first alerted viewers to the fact that his owner, Den, had got the 16-year-old schoolgirl Michelle Fowler (Susan Tully) pregnant in October 1985; one of the soaps most renowned 'whodunit' plots. Following months of speculation, Michelle goes to meet the father at a nearby canal, and Roly bounds out of the mystery man's car, showing the identity of the man to be Den.

Roly is a bit of a rogue from time to time. He tramples over Tom Clements' (Donald Tandy) prize leeks, which leads to Tom stealing Arthur Fowler's (Bill Treacher) leeks and winning first prize in the London in Bloom competition. He also bites Alan McIntyre (Pip Miller) on the bottom after he tries to evict Ali (Nejdet Salih) and Sue Osman (Sandy Ratcliff). He also tears apart Ethel Skinner's (Gretchen Franklin) Christening gown she'd been knitting for the Fowlers.

Roly gives everyone a fright when he eats some rat poison that Debbie Wilkins (Shirley Cheriton) had laid down in the First til Last grocery store. However, after being sick on the floor of James Willmott-Brown's (William Boyde) new carpet at The Dagmar, he makes a full recovery.

Roly is the first to find Pat Wicks (Pam St Clement) in the Albert Square gardens when she had been savaged by the Walford ripper. Pat later demands that he be kicked out of The Vic when the Butchers move in in 1988. Roly then runs away, but is found by Junior Roberts (Aaron Carrington), who returns him to the Butchers. Diane Butcher (Sophie Lawrence) and Ricky Butcher (Sid Owen) change Pat's mind, and Mo Butcher (Edna Doré), who at first suggests they get a kennel for Roly, warms to him so much that he goes to live with her at her flat for a while.

When Eddie Royle (Michael Melia) becomes the new landlord of The Vic in 1990, Roly lives with him and Sharon Watts, who lodges there as barmaid. It is whilst out walking Roly one evening that Eddie is stabbed and left to die in the middle of the Square. His body is only found after Roly begins barking. Roly then lives with his original owner, Sharon, and her husband Grant Mitchell (Ross Kemp).

Roly has several brushes with death over the years. He is injured in a car accident caused by a drunk Pete Beale (Peter Dean) and is nearly burnt alive (along with Sharon) when Grant torches The Vic in an insurance scam. However, in October 1993, Roly's luck finally runs out when Sharon asks Grant to take Roly for a walk, but he pays Mandy Salter (Nicola Stapleton) £10 to do it for him. A few hours later, Mandy returns to explain the circumstances of Roly's death to Grant and Sharon. According to Mandy, Roly slipped his lead to chase a cat and was run over by a lorry. Sharon is devastated. 14.8 million viewers watched Roly's last appearance on-screen. However, in the following episode, Mandy admits to her boyfriend, Aidan Brosnan (Sean Maguire), that she let go of Roly because he was pulling too hard and his lead was cutting into her hand. Grant tries to cheer Sharon up by giving her Freda, Nigel's greyhound, but she refuses to accept her.

== See also ==
- List of fictional dogs
