= Naima Jeffery =

Fictional character from Eastenders

- EastEnders character
- Naima as she appeared in 1987.
- Portrayed by: Shreela Ghosh
- Duration: 1985–1987
- First appearance: Episode 1 “Poor Old Reg” 19 February 1985
- Last appearance: Episode 289; 19 November 1987
In-universe information
- Occupation: Shopkeeper
- Husband: Saeed Jeffery (until 1986); Farrukh Jeffery (1987–present)
- First cousins: Saeed Jeffery; Rezaul Kabir; Farrukh Jeffery

Naima Jeffery is a fictional character from the BBC soap opera EastEnders, played by Shreela Ghosh from 19 February 1985 to 19 November 1987.

South Asian Naima tries to embrace Western culture, but this is not easy since her family constantly try to force her to adhere to their ancient customs. Sick of being forced to live in an arranged marriage with a husband she loathes, Naima makes a stand and shames her family by filing for a divorce.

== Creation and development ==
=== Creation ===
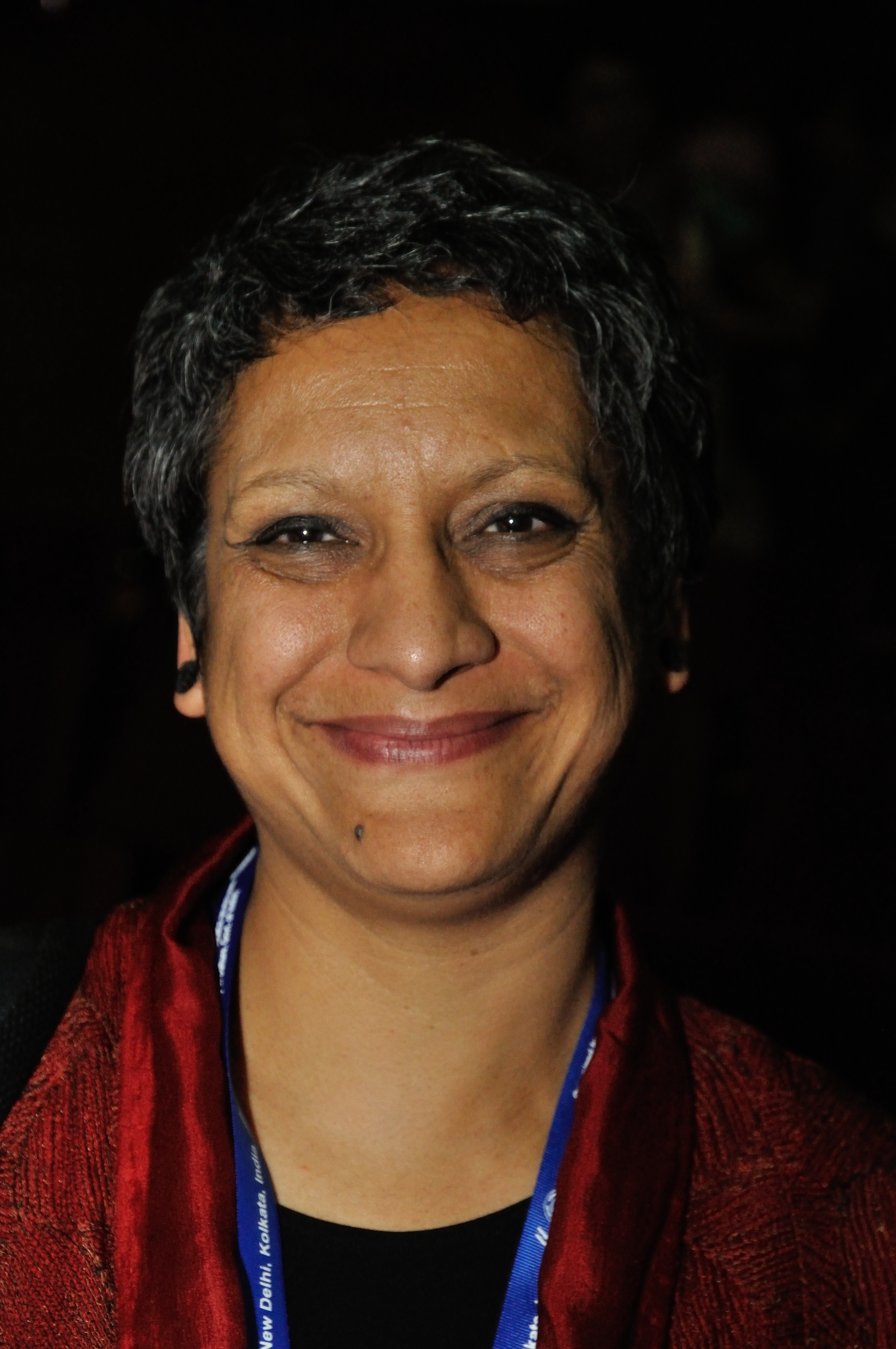
Shreela Ghosh (pictured) portrayed Naima for two years.

Naima Jeffery was one of the original twenty-three characters invented by the creators of EastEnders, Tony Holland and Julia Smith. Naima and her husband were the first Asian characters to appear in the soap. Black and Asian characters were two ethnic minorities that had previously been under-represented in British soap before EastEnders aired. Holland and Smith knew that for the soap to succeed there needed to be a varied group of characters, so that several different sections of the audience had someone to identify with. Additionally, if the programme was to be realistic, it had to reflect the cross-section of society that actually existed in the real location. For these reasons, different sexes, ages, classes, religions and races were all included in the original character line-up. Both Holland and Smith had been at the forefront of the move towards 'integrated casting' in television and had encountered an array of ethnic diversities in the process. Even though the ethnic minority groups were deemed the hardest to research, Holland and Smith called upon their contacts to relay information about their origins and lifestyles and were then able to portray Walford's most recent immigrants more realistically. Naima was originally intended to be named Najma; named after one of Tony Holland's Bengali friends, the wife of Saeed (who was also the character name of Naima's on-screen husband). Holland had attended their arranged marriage, and he thought the notion of an arranged marriage, particularly an unhappy one, would be an interesting and informative topic to tackle in the soap. Because of the similarities with his real-life friends, the name Najma was altered to Naima, in order to protect her identity.

Naima's original character outline as written by Smith and Holland appeared in an abridged form in their book, EastEnders: The Inside Story (In this passage, Naima will be referred to as Najma).

"He is quarter English, three-quarters Bengali and she is wholly Bengali. Their parents were originally from Bangladesh, formerly East Pakistan, and they are Muslims and cousins...Najma had an easier childhood...She became aware that she couldn't accept the traditional role of an Indian wife, but she wasn't enough of a rebel to leave home and adopt a totally different lifestyle...Saeed's mother's father became seriously ill. It was decided that Saeed's parents should return home to India, and a hasty marriage was arranged between Najma and Saeed so the young couple could then run the food store...They are in a confusing situation, accepting the customs of their parents, yet - because of having been born, brought up and educated in this country - feeling that they're slightly English...Neither of them is particularly docile, having lived through the jungle of the school playground, and the cut and thrust of working-class urban life...Saeed and Najma will make a big effort to mix, and most of the time, fail." (page 58)

=== Casting and development ===
Holland and Smith had much trouble casting the role of Naima, as barely any Muslim women responded to their advertisement, and those who did were all unsuitable. Shreela Ghosh, a non-Muslim Indian actress of Bengali ethnicity, was a late arrival. She was a comparatively inexperienced actor, but she was the right age, looked right and she also liked what the programme was trying to do with a young Asian couple. She was subsequently cast in the role.

Naima runs the corner shop, and her early storylines depict the problems of her arranged marriage and portray a character caught between two cultures. Despite being labelled as a stereotypical portrayal of Asian people today, at the time in the 80s such issues had not been widely covered, particularly on mainstream television.

The character lasted in the show for over two years, depicting an independent woman battling against her families wishes and striving to succeed even after her first marriage ended in divorce. The character eventually remarries and returns to her native Bangladesh in November 1987.

== Storylines ==
Original EastEnder Naima runs a corner shop on Bridge Street with her husband Saeed Jeffery (Andrew Johnson). Her parents were originally from Bangladesh, but she was born in England. Naima and her husband are on the receiving end of racial abuse and vandalism from the neo-Nazi group that includes Nick Cotton (John Altman), which make life in Walford particularly unpleasant for them both.

Naima was sent to Walford for an arranged marriage with Saeed. The two don't get on and Naima becomes unwilling to adhere to Muslim customs, regularly disobeying her husband's wishes and refusing to share his bed. Saeed starts visiting prostitutes and regularly goes to the strip-club where Mary Smith (Linda Davidson) works. He later makes obscene phone calls to Naima's good friend Debbie Wilkins (Shirley Cheriton). When Naima is tipped off by an anonymous letter from Dot Cotton (June Brown), she is disgusted with Saeed and decides to go against her family's wishes and divorce him.

After Saeed leaves in December 1985, Naima makes a determined effort to embrace Western culture and feminism. She stops wearing saris, learns to drive, cuts her hair short and moves in with Debbie. With her new look, Naima attracts much male attention on the Square and even dates Walford lothario, Simon Wicks (Nick Berry), as well as Dr Jaggat Singh (Amerjit Deu), but neither relationship develops into anything serious.

Naima's family persist in sending her more cousins to marry and in 1986, Rezaul Kabir (Tanveer Ghani) arrives in England. He lives and works with Naima, reporting her every move to her parents. Naima protests, but as her parents are funding her business, she has to put up with Rezaul. He is arrogant and pretentious, making him and Naima clash immediately. Naima realises her family are attempting to set Razaul up as her new husband and she refuses to oblige (pleasing Razaul as he isn't interested in Naima). Angered by their daughter's defiance, Naima's parents cut off all funds. This leaves Naima struggling to pay her rent and forces her to move into the Fowlers' home for a while.

In 1987, Farrukh (Sumar Khan), also her cousin, is sent over to woo Naima. Farrukh is an important politician in Bangladesh and despite Naima's initial protests, she is drawn to him. Farrukh is different from her other suitors, supporting her independence, so she agrees to marry him. They marry in Birmingham and leave Walford for Bangladesh in November 1987.
