= Debbie Wilkins =

Fictional British TV character

- EastEnders character
- Portrayed by: Shirley Cheriton
- Duration: 1985–1987
- First appearance: Episode 10; 21 March 1985
- Last appearance: Episode 235; 14 May 1987
- Created by: Tony Holland and Julia Smith
- Book appearances: Good Intentions
In-universe information
- Occupation: Bank clerk
- Father: Derek Wilkins
- Mother: Iris Wilkins
- Husband: Terry Rich

Debbie "Debs" Wilkins is a fictional character from the BBC soap opera EastEnders, played by Shirley Cheriton, from 21 March 1985 to 14 May 1987. Debbie is Walford's first upwardly mobile character. She has an on/off relationship with her ill-fated boyfriend Andy O'Brien (Ross Davidson) and she tends to be a bit too pretentious for the working class locals of Albert Square.

== Character creation and development ==
Debbie Wilkins was one of the original twenty-three characters invented by the creators of EastEnders, Tony Holland and Julia Smith. The character of Debbie along with her boyfriend Andy O'Brien (Ross Davidson) were an attempt by Holland and Smith to represent the influx of upwardly mobile people that were opting to move to the usually working-class areas of the East End of London. Gentrification of the East End was on the increase in the 1980s, and in Holland's experience, the new, wealthier residents were never welcomed or truly accepted within the community, and this was what he hoped to convey on-screen with these two characters.

Debbie's original character outline as written by Smith and Holland appeared in an abridged form in their book, EastEnders: The Inside Story.

"Debbie and Andy are living together, they're not married — but it's a serious relationship. The mortgage is in her name... Debbie is bossy and a planner... She and her mother decided at an early stage to beat the East-end at its own game, and get Debbie into a different environment... She wanted to work in a bank and do well... She became part of a household of six: three women, three men in a huge shared flat in Wandsworth... Andy used to come over and visit her... A strange stilted courtship began... They moved to the Square, so Debbie's back in the area that she came from... Partners, in love, and determined to make it the best home ever — they are not so much acquisitive, as lovers of their comfort... Her interfering manner upsets other occupants of the Square... Andy knows she has an unfortunate manner and tries to cover for her when he can. Debbie isn't a snob in the social sense, but as she's skilled labour — a professional woman — she's bound to feel sometimes slightly a cut above the others... Actually, not being accepted by others, being made to feel that they're "outsiders" will frequently prompt Andy and Debbie to consider moving out... Unlike Debbie, who's an ambitious woman working in a traditionally male world, Andy is a very unambitious man working in a traditionally female world... They became in love with the idea that everyone thought they were the perfect couple... The decision to attempt the experiment of living together: A "domestic" relationship, was a difficult one, and they agonised over it for months. Wouldn't they get bored? Would they feel imprisoned? How would they fill the hours, with only the two of them?... They want to knock down walls, put in double-glazing, and all the rest of it.... Forced to move into a different class... They're not habitat/Guardian East-end, and they're certainly not nouveau-riche, but they are, to a lot of people, a possible sign of a shape of things to come in the Borough..." (page 62)

Holland and Smith required the character of Debbie to be bossy, interfering and a definite outsider. They had both worked with the actress Shirley Cheriton on their previous television series about nurses, entitled Angels. Cheriton had proved an extremely popular addition to the cast of Angels and had secured herself a large number of fans. Both Holland and Smith perceived Cheriton to be a "rung or two up from her working-class origins", but she was not posh either, which was perfect for the part of Debbie. They initially worried that Cheriton would have reservations about playing a person who was not immediately liked by everyone, but Cheriton liked the role so she was instantly hired.

The characters of Andy and Debbie were created to represent a young couple with upwardly mobile pretensions, but it was decided that the formula did not work and both characters were eventually written out of the show. Andy ended up being the first main character to be killed off in 1986, just over a year after the show began. During this time, rumours began to circulate in the British press that Ross Davidson (Andy) was axed because Julia Smith disapproved of the off-screen relationship he was having with Shirley Cheriton. This was subsequently denied in EastEnders: The Inside Story. Debbie remained in the show for another year as the writers tried unsuccessfully to reintegrate the character after Andy's departure. Debbie eventually departed after being married off to a policeman played by Gary Whelan, which coincidentally happened to her character Katy in Angels years earlier; marrying a policeman also played by Gary Whelan.

== Storylines ==
Debbie moves to Albert Square with her boyfriend, nurse Andy O'Brien (Ross Davidson) in March 1985. At the time of their arrival, they are the only upwardly mobile residents. They throw cocktail parties, get involved in campaigns and protests, and jog in matching track suits, much to the bemusement of the locals. Many of Debbie’s working class neighbours find her stuck-up; none of them know that Debbie had actually been raised in a Walford council estate, not far from Albert Square. Debbie and Andy have a rocky relationship. Ambitious and determined, Debbie's interests focus upon success, whilst Andy wants to settle down and start a family. When Debbie leaves a steady job as a bank clerk in order to start her own business and make fast money, Andy is furious as they then have insufficient funds to repay their mortgage. Various rows erupt, and Debbie soon discovers that starting her own business is not as easy as she had expected. Without regular work, Debbie begins to struggle financially.

Andy asks Debbie to marry him and for Christmas 1985, he buys her an engagement ring; however, she is mugged on New Year's Eve and it is stolen. Andy subsequently becomes over-protective, which infuriates Debbie as it goes against her ideals of female equality. The situation between Debbie and Andy is complicated further by local policeman Roy Quick (Douglas Fielding), who begins wooing Debbie early in 1986. This leads to Debbie and Andy having an open relationship; dating other people, but living together. The situation is not ideal however, as Andy gets jealous seeing Debbie pursued. Roy is infatuated with Debbie and asks her to marry him several times, but Debbie declines when she realises she wants to marry Andy after all. Debbie and Andy's happiness does not to last as in August 1986 Andy runs in front of a truck to save a toddler from being hit and is killed. Debbie’s grief is compounded with guilt as her last words to Andy during a row are "drop dead". Debbie is unable to pay her mortgage after Andy dies so she moves in with her friend Naima Jeffery (Shreela Ghosh).

In 1987 the women of Walford are targeted by a man known as the "Walford attacker". Sharon Watts (Letitia Dean), Sue Osman (Sandy Ratcliff) and Pat Wicks (Pam St Clement) all have encounters with the attacker and in April that year, Debbie is attacked too. While she is alone in the launderette, the "Walford attacker" (Colum Gallivan) attempts to assault her. Debbie manages to ward him off using self-defence, which leads to his eventual capture. Debbie's heroic act leads to her meeting Detective Terry Rich (Gary Whelan), who is investigating the case. He asks Debbie to act as his girlfriend in an under-cover stake-out being held in a restaurant, and after getting to know each other they begin dating. When Terry is transferred to another division in Crawley, Debbie decides to leave with him. They get engaged and throw a celebratory leaving party in The Queen Vic, departing in May 1987. Debbie's last words to her friends and neighbours are a paraphrasing of Rhett Butler's famous line in the 1939 film Gone With The Wind, when she says "You know love, quite frankly I don't give a damn"! Two months after leaving Walford, Debbie writes to Naima to tell her that she is pregnant; Debbie and Terry marry off-screen.
