= Sue Osman =

Fictional character from the BBC soap opera EastEnders

- EastEnders character
- Portrayed by: Sandy Ratcliff
- Duration: 1985–1989
- First appearance: Episode 1 "Poor Old Reg"; 19 February 1985
- Last appearance: Episode 448; 23 May 1989
- Created by: Julia Smith and Tony Holland
- Introduced by: Julia Smith
In-universe information
- Occupation: Café owner
- Husband: Ali Osman
- Sons: Hassan Osman; Little Ali Osman

Sue Osman is a fictional character from the BBC soap opera EastEnders, played by Sandy Ratcliff. She is one of the serial's original characters, appearing in its first episode on 19 February 1985 and departing on-screen in May 1989. Created by Tony Holland and Julia Smith, Sue is portrayed as argumentative, insecure and tragic. A pivotal storyline in the character's narrative is the cot-death of her son, which was one of the show's first controversial plots. During her four years on-screen, the character contends with a phantom pregnancy, marital breakdown and finally insanity. Ratcliff left the role in 1989.

== Creation ==
Sue Osman was one of the original twenty-three characters invented by the creators of EastEnders, Tony Holland and Julia Smith. British Sue and her Turkish Cypriot husband Ali, were an attempt to portray a multi-cultural relationship, with an emphasis on conflicting customs, cultural and personality differences. Their marriage was scripted to be volatile, highlighting the problems that can occur when customs and beliefs are not shared in a relationship.

Sue's original character outline as written by Smith and Holland appeared in an abridged form in their book, EastEnders: The Inside Story.

Sue was the child of older parents. Affection was what was missing from the house. No real love, no fire and no closeness. She never saw her parents touch each other, or demonstrate tenderness ... Is Sue actually looking for a bad time in life? Is she a big martyr? Perhaps convinced that her parents had no affection for her, she can't understand anyone else doing so. She's a very insecure woman — furiously jealous and possessive and always accusing her husband of being unfaithful. She is always putting herself in the position of being the victim. Sometimes she nearly goads her husband into hitting her ... A gigantic, self-imposed, chip on her shoulder... She needs dramas — it's something she is good at. She is a poisonous bitch, but it is important that we understand why.

Holland and Smith required the character of Sue to appear 'hard', but also to be a 'loser' and a 'victim'. They initially considered casting the role of Sue to Gillian Taylforth, the actress who would go on to play Kathy Beale in the serial. In the end she was rejected because she had blonde hair and they had always envisioned Sue to be a brunette. Sandy Ratcliff (previously a model who was cast as Lord Snowdon's face of the seventies) was recommended for the role by the writer Bill Lyons. Ratcliff was invited in for audition. Holland and Smith were struck by her appearance, suggesting she had "one of the most photogenic faces on television". They suggested that she had a "toughness in her face and manner, a fiery gypsy-like quality." and that she sounded "East-end enough". Holland and Smith surmised that Ratcliff would clearly be competent at playing the "hard" aspect to Sue's character, but they were not originally certain that Ratcliff would be able to portray the loser and victim aspects as convincingly because, on the surface, Ratcliff appeared to be the exact opposite.

Ratcliff was renowned for being a staunch feminist and a political actress; Holland and Smith initially feared that her own personality and strongly held views would be at odds with the character. For instance, Ratcliff requested that they make the cafe that Sue was scripted to run into a "women's-only bookshop". Ratcliff was also not renowned for being the most disciplined actress, 'more the free spirit', which sparked fears over how she would react to the strict disciplines of a twice-weekly drama. However, it was eventually decided that Ratcliff did possess all the qualities that were needed to play Sue convincingly and, despite initial objections from Ratcliff's agent who did not approve of her artists appearing in soap operas, she become "hot favourite" for the role. Although auditioning for Sue was done first, the casting could not be confirmed until an actor was found to play her husband, Ali. Ratcliff was brought in at a later date to read scripts with two potential actors, Nejdet Salih and Haluk Bilginer (two out of only three working Turkish speaking actors in London at the time). The creators differed in opinion on which of the two they wanted to have the role; it was initially felt that Ratcliff would "make mincemeat" out of Salih, but following a successful reading, it was eventually decided that Salih and Ratcliff worked as the Osman partnership and were cast as Sue and Ali. Bilginer was cast as Ali's brother Mehmet.

== Development ==
Sue has been described as "highly strung" with a parlous emotional state. Author Hilary Kingsley has suggested that Sue was a character who was "dogged by tragedy". She suggested that Sue was a "moaner" but despite this she "did enjoy life a lot", making reference to her love for her husband Ali (despite his flaws) and her babies as evidence of this. Kingsley's summation of Sue stems around psychological problems however, with her suggesting that Sue was "always mentally unstable" and that she was never "that strong at the best of times". In her book Soapbox, Kingsley suggested that Sue, like many women in EastEnders, was "very much the power behind the throne. She virtually runs the cafe singlehanded. She fights with their [property] landlord, tells the customers (the other residents) the unvarnished truth about themselves and struggles to keep Ali from gambling away the profits."

Before the show aired, Holland and Smith had already decided that Sue and her husband would be parents to a young baby named Hassan. However, as further characters were invented they realised that there would be a total of four babies in the show: Annie Smith, Martin Fowler, Vicki Fowler and Hassan. It was decided that it would be impossible for the studios to cope with four babies, and so they invented a storyline to eliminate one of the young babies from the cast. During this time in the 1980s, the issue of cot death was prominent in the British press, partly due to an increase in casualties, but also because a doctor had gone public with the accusation that parents were to blame for the tragic occurrence. Holland and Smith decided that covering this issue in the soap would be a good way of 'setting the record straight', and so it was decided that Sue and Ali's baby would die from cot death in the early months of the show. This was the first of many controversial storylines in EastEnders' history. After the storyline aired in June 1985, the show was praised by audience and press alike for the sensitive and unsensational way the subject was treated. The sudden tragedy came as a surprise to the audience, especially since the bereaved parents were a couple whose feuding, fighting ways had made them appear rather comic in the early episodes of the show. The British Cot Death Foundation initially feared that a soap opera would trivialise the subject and frighten new parents. They tried to stop the episodes from airing, but in the end they were pleased with the way the subject was handled, and provided back-up support after transmission to many viewers who wanted more information on the subject.

In 1987, after a long period of being shown trying to conceive, scriptwriters finally decided to make Sue pregnant with her second child. Sandy Ratcliff was positive about the storyline: "It's going to be the making of Sue and Ali. Neither of them has ever got over the death of Hassan but hopefully the new baby will fill the void in their life." Discussing the ongoing storyline depicting marital problems with the Osmans, Nedjet Salih who said: "The marriage was going downhill. Ali is no angel, but he's had a lot to put up with and has been very tolerant about Sue's depressions. Sue hasn't been easy to live with, she's been such a misery. No wonder he's been looking at other women ... although to be honest it's all bravado. He'd get cold feet when it came to it. It's really only Sue he loves and wants."

According to Ratcliff, Sue getting pregnant put her in a dilemma because she worried that happiness for the Osmans would need to be curtailed if she decided to leave the programme; she felt this would be unfair on viewers because of all the misery Sue had been put through on-screen already. Discussing this in 1987, Ratcliff said, "I knew nothing about the baby plans until a few weeks ago when I came back from my holidays and was told that Sue was pregnant again. Sue has gone through enough in the last couple of years. I'm glad she's got her dearest wish [to have another baby]. I think she'll make a great mum and I'm sure Ali will be supportive. Hopefully, the storylines will open up for me, but it also means that if the pregnancy goes well and the baby is fine, it would be very difficult for me to leave without there being another tragedy in the Osman family. I don't think that would be fair on the show or the viewers."

Additionally, the turmoil that Sue had been through had led Ratcliff to consider quitting the serial prematurely. In 1987 she told the magazine Woman's Own, "[Sue]'s been such an unhappy woman since Hassan died. And it was beginning to rub off on me. I'd go to work, six days a week, be stuck in that grim little cafe and be permanently miserable. I got to the stage when I started to ask myself if I really wanted to spend all my working life playing a misery." However, according to Ratcliff, the scriptwriters decision to make Sue pregnant changed her mind about leaving. She said, "Now Sue is pregnant and happy I feel differently about the role. So maybe it would be fun to stick around for a couple more years – if I'm wanted."

The character of Sue lasted in the show for four years, and many of her storylines resulted from the after-effects of the cot death plot, including the deterioration of her mental health. The actress was said to have been exposed to "horrific invasions of privacy" by the media during her tenure, in particular when it was revealed to the press in 1987 that she had spent time in prison for conspiracy to sell cannabis. At this time Ratcliff reportedly offered to leave the programme; however, producer Julia Smith stood by her and Ratcliff remained in the role of Sue for a further two years. Sue was eventually written out of the serial in 1989 following further off-screen personal problems; Ratcliff admitted that she had been a heroin addict for eight years and was spending half her wages on drugs. On-screen, Sue's marriage to Ali broke down and she absconded with their baby, only to have a mental breakdown and be admitted to a psychiatric ward when Ali retrieved the child.

== Storylines ==
=== Backstory ===
Sue's parents had her late in life; they were not demonstrative towards each other or to her. In 1982, Sue married Ali Osman (Nejdet Salih), a Turkish Cypriot, and gave birth to their first baby Hassan Osman in May 1984. Together they lease and run the Bridge street cafè in Walford and are the first known owners of the premises.

=== 1985–1989 ===
Sue is shown to be a woman who does not shy away from speaking her mind. She has various altercations, particularly with dowager Lou Beale (Anna Wing), who accuses Sue of having no community spirit. Sue's suspicious, insecure nature also provokes arguments between her and Ali, whom she often accuses of cheating. She has rows with other female residents, including Kathy Beale (Gillian Taylforth), Angie Watts (Anita Dobson), Debbie Wilkins (Shirley Cheriton), Mary Smith (Linda Davidson) and Michelle Fowler (Susan Tully), whom she suspects are trying to seduce her husband, although in truth, all that ever occurs is flirtation.

In June 1985, tragedy strikes for the Osmans when Sue awakes to discover baby Hassan laying motionless in his cot. Sue and Ali rush his lifeless body to local nurse Andy O'Brien (Ross Davidson), but Hassan is already dead. A postmortem reveals no definitive cause of death, so it is concluded that he died during his sleep from cot death. After discovering Hassan's body, Sue goes into shock. She remains in a trance like state for weeks, refusing to eat, sleep, cry or acknowledge her own grief. She later begins blaming herself unfairly for her son's sudden and unexplainable death. Her mental health continues to deteriorate and she becomes despondent towards Ali; their marriage disintegrates in a welter of depression. Sue eventually manages to come to terms with Hassan's death with the help of Dr Legg (Leonard Fenton), who takes the desperate measure of placing Mary's baby, Annie, in her lap, allowing her, finally, to acknowledge her pent-up sadness.

Sue obsesses with the idea of having another child but no matter how hard she and Ali try, they cannot conceive. A phantom pregnancy in May 1986 leaves her heartbroken and she later tries to convince Michelle to let her adopt Michelle's daughter Vicki, culminating in Michelle slapping Sue. In September, Sue begins toying with the idea of adopting a Turkish child from Cyprus, which is met with indignation from Ali's family. She and Ali decide to apply to adopt in the UK instead. They meet a social worker to assess their suitability; however, their application is rejected because it is felt they are applying too quickly after the death of their child. Sue agonizes over this and in 1987, she faces more turmoil after finding a lump on her breast; she fears she has breast cancer. After much worrying, she is eventually persuaded to get the lump checked out and is subsequently given the all-clear. Later in the year, Sue grows attached to Ali's nephews and niece when they come to stay with her in Walford, and is saddened when they go home several months later. Still unable to conceive, Sue begins to crave a baby more than ever and Ali tires of her eternal broodiness. Sue decides she wants to move to the Isle of Dogs, thinking that the milder climate may increase her chances of conceiving. Ali refuses and in a fury, Sue packs a suitcase and disappears without word. Ali believes she has left him, but Sue is only visiting an old school friend and she returns in October 1987 to announce that she is expecting another baby. In March 1988, she gives birth to another son, "Little Ali", who is delivered by Lofty Holloway (Tom Watt) and Pauline Fowler (Wendy Richard). Sue's desperation to be a good mother means that she often excludes her husband from parental duties. She becomes so obsessed with her baby's welfare that she has no time for Ali and their relationship suffers. Feeling neglected and tired of his wife's nagging, Ali has sex with Donna Ludlow (Matilda Ziegler). However, Donna blackmails Ali, threatening to inform Sue about their tryst unless he pays her regularly. A fearful Ali pays, silencing Donna for a while, but in March 1989 Sue argues with Donna, banning her from the café. In retaliation, Donna informs Sue about the affair. Upset, Sue turns to Ali's brother Mehmet (Haluk Bilginer) for comfort and attempts to kiss an innocent Mehmet in front of Ali for revenge. Believing that Sue is having an affair with his brother, Ali assaults Mehmet then informs Mehmet's wife Guizin (Ishia Bennison) about the fabricated affair, causing the Osman family to fracture. Following threats from Ali, Sue takes their son and leaves Walford.

Ali spends months trying to track his estranged wife down. He eventually finds her visiting their dead son's grave. While she is distracted, Ali snatches his son and this is the final straw for Sue's fragile emotional state and losing Little Ali causes her to have a breakdown. Despondent and unresponsive, she is sectioned and admitted to a psychiatric hospital in May 1989. Just over three months later towards the end of August, Kathy Beale visits Sue off-screen and tells Ali that Sue wants contact with their son, but he refuses to allow her access.

== Reception ==
Hilary Kingsley has suggested that despite Sue's flaws, due to the skill of Sandy Ratcliff, "you can't help feeling sorry for her". She has added that "A lot of hearts were touched by Sandy Ratcliff when she played the tragic Sue Osman". Further, it has been suggested that "the tempestuous relationship between Sue and Ali Osman kept many an EastEnders viewer on the edge of their seat." They couple were described as a Diet Coke version of the popular EastEnders couple, Den and Angie "running the café rather than the Queen Vic".

In 1988, Journalist for USA Today, Matt Roush, described Sue and Ali as two of the serial's more colourful residents. Discussing the cotdeath storyline, which aired in 1985 in the UK, Roush said, "When tragedy strikes, as in the case of Ali (Nejdet Salih) and jealous wife [Sue] (Sandy Ratcliff), EastEnders becomes achingly believable. Try to remember the last time you saw soap stars deal with the bureaucracy of registering death certificates and canceling welfare benefits."

Ratcliff has been critical of her character. In a 1987 interview she commented, "Sue really annoys me sometimes because she's got no guts. I'd love to liven her up a bit, dress her in some of Angie's clothes, get her out of that cafe, set her up in a business of her own and allow her to make something of her life." Ratcliff was also critical that Sue was not more of a feminist: "I was under the impression she'd become more assertive. I had visions of a bunch of feminists walking into the cafe one day right in the middle of a typical Sue and Ali fight, and them asking her why she puts up with him. No doubt Sue would screw up her nose and ask: 'What do you mean?' But she'd think about it, want to hear more and gradually begin to change her ways to become stronger, more independent! I get cheesed off with Sue. She isn't me at all."

In 2011, an EastEnders' storyline aired featuring the character Ronnie Branning's baby dying of a cot death and the mother subsequently swapping her dead baby with another character's child. This plot has been compared unfavourably to the Osman cot death of 1985.
