= BiBi Crew =

British comedy troupe of Black actresses

BiBi Crew, founded in 1991, was the first British comedy troupe to consist entirely of Black actresses. Their work focuses on the Black British experience.

== History ==
In 1991, Joanne Campbell, Judith Jacob, Janet Kay, Suzette Llewellyn, Josephine Melville, Beverley Michaels and Suzanne Packer founded BiBi Crew in London. According to Jacob and Michaels, the group was founded in response to The Posse, a comedy group made up of Black actors. Michaels saw the troupe perform and thought "there should be a group of women doing this" and contacted the other women involved. Campbell has stated that the group formed after a memorial benefit at the Theatre Royal Stratford East to celebrate the life of actor Calvin Simpson, in which a few of the troupe members participated.

The troupe's name combines the word for lady in Swahili and Urdu, with the use of the word crew, which was popular with American music groups, and which the group thought gave them some "street cred". They were all of "Caribbean descent", and "devised and produced work with an African Caribbean perspective" that drew on their personal experiences.^{:74} They wrote, directed, produced and acted in their productions, which combined music, dance, drama and sketch comedy^{:44} They were regular performers at the Theatre Royal Stratford East and contributed to the theatre's mission to reflect the diversity of Newham where it was located.^{:305} They also toured throughout the United Kingdom and United States.^{:20}

== Reunion ==
BiBi Crew reunited in 2005 without Campbell, who died in 2002, and Kay, who was pursuing a career in music.

== Legacy ==
They contributed to the emergence of a black comedy circuit in Britain in the 1990s. Along with groups such as The Posse, they "introduced a new energized performance style into diasporic theatre in the early 1990s that was breaking away from old categories and attracting a black audience with sketch-like material, often highly political, rooted in common experience"^{:195} Additionally, their performances at the Theatre Royal Stratford East helped to inspire the subsequent Asian revue series.^{:20}

== Productions ==
- On A Level (1992), Theatre Royal Stratford East
- But Stop! We Got Work To Do (1995), Bloomsbury Theatre
- Shut Down (2017), Hackney Picturehouse
- Get Raunchy (2018), Bernie Grant Arts Centre

== See also ==
- The Real McCoy
- A Black Lady Sketch Show
