= Josephine Melville =

British actress, director and writer (1961–2022)

- Melville in BiBi Crew Parody Advert 2017
- Born: 4 December 1961; West Ham, [London], England
- Died: 20 October 2022 (aged 61); Nottingham Playhouse, Nottingham, Nottinghamshire, England
- Occupations: Actress, director
- Known for: EastEnders (1986)

Josephine Crawford Melville (12 April 1961 – 20 October 2022) was a British actress, director and writer who was best known for starring as Tessa Parker in the television soap opera EastEnders (1986).

Others credit include American Playhouse (1983), Empire State (1987), Prime Suspect (1992), Pie in the Sky (1994), The Bill (1995), Little Miss Jocelyn (2008), and Hold the Sunset (2019).

== Life and career ==
Melville was born in West Ham, London on 12 April 1961. After first appearing on television in 1983 in Luna, Essex-born Melville portrayed Tessa Parker in eight episodes of EastEnders in 1986, and Ellie Wright in one episode in 2005. She also had roles on television in The Bill, Prime Suspect, Casualty and Pie in the Sky, among others, and in early 2022 she appeared in the music video for Ella Henderson's "Brave".

In feature films, she had roles in Empire State (1987) and in Slammer (2022). In 2021 she produced and directed Assistance, a short thriller.

In 2021, Melville held workshops across Essex as part of the Know Your Roots project on preserving the stories of black women's hair. In Southend-on-Sea, where she lived, she founded the South Essex African Caribbean Association and organised the East Beach Festival.

On 20 October 2022, Melville collapsed backstage after performing in a production of Natasha Gordon's play Nine Night at the Nottingham Playhouse. She was treated by paramedics but died at the scene.

== Filmography ==
=== Film ===
| Year | Title | Role | |
|---|---|---|---|
| 1987 | Empire State | Secretary | |
| 2021 | Dead Of Night | Grandma | |
| 2022 | Slammer | Detective Russell | Film |

=== Television ===
| Year | Title | Role | Notes |
|---|---|---|---|
| 1983 | American Playhouse | Free Space Company | S2.E7: episode "The Files on Jill Hatch: Part III" |
| 1986 | EastEnders | Tessa Parker | 8 episodes |
| 1992 | Prime Suspect | Esta | S1.E1 & 2 "Operation Nadine" Parts 1 & 2 |
| 1994 | Pie in the Sky | Cass | |
| 1995 | The Bill | Viv Austin | S11.E94: episode: "Mother's Ruin" |
| 2005 | EastEnders | Ellie Wright | 1 episode |
| 2008 | Little Miss Jocelyn | | S2.E3: episode "Little miss Jocelin" |
| 2012 | L8r | Monique | Episode: "Youngers 2" |
| 2019 | Hold the Sunset | Rebecca | S2.E1: episode: "The Sale" |
