= Weekend Playhouse =

Television series

Weekend Playhouse is a one-hour British television anthology drama series produced by London Weekend Television (LWT) and airing on ITV from 8 July to 19 August 1984. There were seven episodes.

== Episodes ==
No.	Title	Directed by	Written by	Original release date
1	"You Don't Have to Fly"	Brian Parker	Gawn Grainger	8 July 1984
Bob Hoskins (Eddie Reed), David Beames (Jack), Janet Key (Anne Reed), Heather Tobias (Mother), Andrew O'Brien (Michael Reed), John Tams (Farmworker), Donald Tandy (Dave), Al Ashton (Joe), Trevor Butler (Keith), Barbara Peak (Teacher, Joyce), John Anton (Milkman).
2	"Singles Weekend"	John Reardon	David Cook	15 July 1984
Peter Jones (Arthur Saunders), Pat Heywood (Nancy Saunders), Brenda Blethyn (Jean Saunders), Griff Rhys Jones (Michael), Maria Charles (Rose), Robert Gillespie (Night Porter), Robert Longden (Robert), Jeff Rawle (Wilf), Sarah Thurstan (Mary), Mandy More (Vicky), Richenda Carey (Anita), Michael Crompton (Barman), Joan Scott (Gert), Stella Moray (Daisy).
3	"As Man and Wife"	John Bruce	Lesley Bruce	22 July 1984
Michael Kitchen (Ed), Dinah Stabb (Carol), Rhys Hopkins (Tom), Tricia George (Pam Davies), Wayne Jackman (Mick Yardley), Jenny Stallwood (Lucy), Gemma Jade Amass (Sophie)
4	"Grand Duo"	John Glenister	Freda Kelsall	29 July 1984
Prunella Scales (Olive Dodd), Judy Parfitt (Daphne Mayhew), Anthony Bate (Reverend V. J. Sinclair Dodd (Jack), Bernard Horsfall (Logan Mayhew), Richard Austin (Gregory Dodd), Daniel Moynihan (Julian Abbott), Pearl Hackney (Miss Bullivant), Luke Dolan (Patrick Lumsden), Joanna Dolan (Isabelle Lumsden), Hugh Dickson (Roger Barclay).
5	"Not That Kind of People"	David Tucker	Olwen Wymark	5 August 1984
Gwen Watford (Regina), Richard Pearson (Donald), Sarah Keller (Phil), Peter Chelsom (Kenny), Mark Wing-Davey (Roland), Mary Griffiths (Mrs Batsford), John Grillo (Neighbour), Michael Cule (Fat Man), Lockwood West (Solicitor).
6	"Change Partners"	John Davies	Julian Bond	12 August 1984
Peter McEnery (Dominic Hanson), Anna Carteret (Sarah Burns), Michael Byrne (Paul Burns), Heather Sears (Kate Hanson), Edward Hicks (Philip Hanson), Rebecca Morahan (Caroline Burns), Nathan Miller (Andrew Burns).
7	"Winter Break"	John Reynolds	Leigh Jackson	19 August 1984
Brenda Bruce (Margaret), Sharon Duce (Susan), Jason Savage (Kieran), Sid Owen (Patrick), Bradley Hardiman (Sean), Sarah Kerslake (Mary), Wayne Watkins (John), Phyllis McMahon (Sister Mary), Alan Surtees (Mr Loughrey), Elizabeth Bennett (Charlotte), Ian Mercer (Brian), Gilly Coman (Linda), Diane Healey (Janet).
