= Harold Legg =

Fictional character from EastEnders

- EastEnders character
- Portrayed by: Leonard Fenton
- Duration: 1985–1997, 2000, 2004, 2007, 2018–2019
- First appearance: Episode 1 "Poor Old Reg"; 19 February 1985
- Last appearance: Episode 5870; 15 February 2019
- Created by: Tony Holland and Julia Smith
- Introduced by: Julia Smith (1985); John Yorke (2000, 2018); Louise Berridge (2004); Diederick Santer (2007)
- Book appearances: Home Fires Burning
- Spin-off appearances: EastEnders: The Podcast (2019)
In-universe information
- Occupation: General practitioner
- Father: Gregory Legg
- Mother: Esther Legg
- Sisters: Hester Samuels; Miriam Legg
- Wife: Judith Legg (backstory)
- Uncles: Leon
- Nephews: David Samuels

Dr. Harold Legg is a fictional character from the BBC soap opera EastEnders, played by Leonard Fenton. Dr. Legg is Walford's original GP. He is widely trusted within the community, and is always on hand to dish out advice. Dr Legg appears as a regular character between 1985 and 1989, but continued to appear in a recurring role until 1997. He was officially retired in 1999 by executive producer Matthew Robinson, but made brief returns in 2000, 2004 and 2007. He returned for a longer storyline from 18 October 2018 and departed on 15 February 2019 when he died of pancreatic cancer.

== Creation and development ==
Dr Harold Legg was one of the original twenty-three characters invented by the creators of EastEnders, Tony Holland and Julia Smith. Dr Legg was an attempt to represent the successive wave of Jewish immigrants that had settled in the East End of London between 1881 and 1914 in order to avoid the persecution that they were being subjected to in the rest of Europe. The second generation of East End born Jews (as Dr Legg was meant to represent) prospered in the area until the 1930s when Oswald Mosley's British Union of Fascists was formed, and used violence to instil fear in the Jewish population. As the Jewish community grew wealthier, many moved out of the East End to more affluent areas of London, just as the character of Dr Legg had done on-screen when the show began; living in Islington, but commuting to his practice in Walford.

Dr Legg's original character outline as written by Smith and Holland appeared in an abridged form in their book, EastEnders: The Inside Story.

"His parents took the name Legg from the street they used to live in... the tough time came in the mid-thirties when the extreme right and Mosley on one hand, and the persecution of the Jews in Europe on the other, forced him as a bright teenager to become positively aware of racism, freedom and persecution. He didn't become a communist, he didn't start hating all Germans – but he did stop going to the Synagogue... he decided as he approached seventeen to become a doctor... perhaps he should have been a musician? Like his uncle Leon... He saw the air raid casualties... it reinforced his passion for the underdog... he met and fell in love with a young (non-Jewish) nurse - they were married when he was twenty-one... She was in the garden when a dog-fight took place overhead, and the German pilot dropped his bomb in order to get away. The corner of the Square went – so did she." (page 53)

Holland and Smith had difficulties in casting the role of Dr Legg, as they had problems finding an actor of the right age, intelligence, and class, who could also play a Jewish professional man. Jewish actor Leonard Fenton was suggested by the writer Bill Lyons and took a great interest in the role. Holland and Smith thought that he would be perfect and he was subsequently cast as Dr Legg. Fenton has since revealed that the character was based on him. He has commented, "It wasn't easy raising a family on theatre wages, so EastEnders couldn't have come at a better time. It was the first time I had played myself on television. I'm normally a character actor, but Dr Legg was based on me."

Dr Legg was conveyed as a man that was trusted within the community. A traditional GP with roots in the East End, who had a genuine concern for his loyal patients and the area. The majority of his storylines concerned other characters' problems (where he was seen as the first port of call should anyone need advice or fall ill), or they related to his own professional conduct. His personal life was largely kept hidden from viewers, although he would occasionally reminisce about his and Albert Square's history, mainly with other characters supposedly born in the area, such as Ethel Skinner (Gretchen Franklin), Lou Beale (Anna Wing) and later Benny Bloom (Arnold Yarrow). The character was also featured within a series of spin-off EastEnders novels by Hugh Miller, set prior to 1985. Within the novelisation entitled Home Fires Burning, readers were made privy to the character's history as a trainee doctor during World War II, and his blossoming relationship with his would be wife, Judith.

The character served as Walford's GP for 14 years. Although his first name of Harold was first spoken by the visiting DI Marsh (Harry Miller) in the final scene of the show's second episode in 1985, he has always been referred to by the majority of the other characters and in the closing credits as "Dr Legg". Though a regular character with his own storylines throughout the 1980s, for much of the 1990s he was a recurring character, making increasingly sporadic appearances, and only when other characters needed medical assistance. In 1998, the executive producer of EastEnders, Matthew Robinson, announced that he was officially retiring Dr Legg. The character was one of many axed by the producer, who was dubbed the "axeman" by the British press. Speaking of his decision, Robinson commented "Dr Legg is getting on a bit, so we're retiring him. He'll be going to a nice cottage in the country." His place was filled by a younger alternative medicine fan, Dr Fred Fonseca, played by Jimi Mistry. Leonard Fenton has since spoken about his frustration that Dr Legg did not get to practice enough, claiming that he "was frustrated for years by Dr Legg's sporadic appearances". In an interview in 2000, Fenton commented "I told them I wasn't happy about going on once every two months. That's why it ended...". Dr Legg was never given an official exit on-screen, his retirement is mentioned by Dr Fonseca in January 1999, when the character Ruth Fowler (Caroline Paterson) requests to see him.

Since his retirement, Dr Legg makes several brief cameos in the soap, his returns relating to storylines concerning other long-running characters. In 2000, executive producer John Yorke brought him back for the death of Ethel Skinner, in 2004 Louise Berridge brought him back for the funeral of Mark Fowler (Todd Carty), and he was brought back for one episode in 2007 by Diederick Santer, to provide counsel for the character Dot Branning (June Brown).

It was announced on 25 July 2018 that Yorke had reintroduced Dr Legg for an "emotional" storyline with Dot later that year, eleven years after his last appearance. Spoiler pictures of on-location filming featuring Dr Legg and Dot were also released. The pictures feature Dot and Dr Legg joyfully meeting again after a long time. Daniel Kilkelly of Digital Spy teased that the scenes would be emotional and warned viewers to "get the tissues ready!" Fenton expressed his excitement at reprising his role, while Brown said that it was "an utter delight" to work with Fenton again. On Dr Legg's return, Yorke commented, "It's a huge honour to have Leonard back in the show and to see him and June working together again for an exciting and emotional story."

== Storylines ==
=== Backstory ===
Dr Legg first appears in EastEnders when it begins on 19 February 1985. He is the local doctor for Walford, where he had lived most of his life, opening his practice there in 1947.

His Jewish family had moved out of the East End when Oswald Mosley began his fascist marches in the 1930s. (It was at the Battle of Cable Street that he met his wife Judith.) They moved to Finchley in North London, but young Harold commuted daily to his East End grammar school, to avoid any disruption to his education. He went to St Bartholomew's Hospital to start his medical training in 1940, treated air raid casualties, and met and married a non-Jewish nurse, named Judith Martin. They bought a small house in Albert Square. They lived there happily, but during the war a German bomb exploded near number 5 Albert Square and killed Judith. He never remarried, despite the hard work of matchmaking aunts and Dr Legg since devotes his life to keeping the residents of Albert Square healthy.

=== 1985–1997 ===
Dr Legg later moved to Islington, living there for several years, but continued to maintain his surgery in Albert Square, renting the flat upstairs to Ethel Skinner (Gretchen Franklin) and the barman Lofty Holloway (Tom Watt) among an array of other tenants.

As Walford's GP, Harold is forever getting called upon to treat the troubled residents, even when he is not on duty, including helping Sue Osman (Sandy Ratcliff) come to terms with the death of her son, and humouring hypochondriac Dot Cotton (June Brown).

In 1988, Harold's sister, Hester Samuels (Barbara Shelley), comes to Walford to visit and tells him that her son, David (Christopher Reich), is interested in joining him in Britain. As David is a doctor in Israel, Harold thinks it is a great idea and in April that year, David joins him in Walford and is made a partner in the practice. Harold even moves back to Walford and he and David live in the flat above the surgery. Despite being extremely fond of each other, the new partners argue about almost everything. David wants to modernize the surgery and bring in computers but Harold is set in his ways and is opposed to any obvious changes. Harold also disagrees with David's friendship with their secretary, Michelle Fowler (Susan Tully), particularly when the two get drunk at a Christmas party, leave together and share the same bed. David awakes the next day not remembering a thing, but is reassured when Michelle informs him that he had been too drunk to do anything untoward anyway. Harold is not convinced however and berates David for the degradation he brought upon himself and the surgery. Later, David and Harold fall out over Harold's treatment of patients when he discovers that Colin Russell (Michael Cashman), is showing early symptoms of multiple sclerosis. He decides not to tell Colin as worrying about his condition could bring on another attack although Colin may not have another attack for 20 years or so, choosing instead to tell Colin that he is overworked and anemic. This highly unethical move appalls David but despite this, Harold continues to refuse to tell Colin about his illness. However, in January 1989, he finally tells Colin the truth. Colin is furious that Harold had kept this information from him and refuses to listen when he tries to explain his reasons. He threatens to report Dr Legg to the authorities and is mortified at how unethical he has been. Although Dr Legg is sorry, he stands by his decision to lie, feeling that Colin benefited from not knowing - when in fact, the opposite is true.

David later becomes incensed by his uncle's lack of persistence concerning Donna Ludlow's (Matilda Ziegler) heroin addiction and blames him for her death later in the year. Things reach a climax in May 1989 when Dr Legg fails to diagnose Vicki Fowler's (Samantha Leigh Martin) meningitis and Vicki almost dies, consequently his practitioners no longer trust him and makes him question his abilities as a doctor, sending him into early retirement. This leaves the medical practice in the hands of his nephew but David's more modern methods prove unpopular with the older residents so Harold comes out of retirement. David tries to fight his decision but his Israeli girlfriend, Ruth (Nitza Saul) makes him see how futile the arguing has become. David and Harold manage to sort out their differences before David returns to Israel in September that year.

Dr Legg's appears semi-regularly from this time, usually only when another character needs medical assistance or advice. However, he remains Walford's GP. He officially retires and leaves after February 1997 and is replaced with a younger, trendier doctor named Fred Fonseca (Jimi Mistry).

=== 2000–2008 ===
He makes several brief appearances after this time however, attending Ethel's funeral in September 2000 and Mark Fowler (Todd Carty)'s in April 2004.

In June 2007, Dot visits him seeking advice. He sends wreaths to the funerals of Pauline Fowler (Wendy Richard) in January 2007 and Frank Butcher (Mike Reid) in April 2008 but does not attend them. In December 2008, he telephones Dot with news of Janine Butcher (Charlie Brooks), now known as Judith Bernstein, and her upcoming wedding to an elderly Jewish man.

=== 2018–2019 ===
In October 2018, Dot experiences dizziness and she thinks she is dying despite the fact that two doctors tell her she is healthy. Dot then visits Dr Legg, who reassures her about her health. He goes to the Vic with Dot and tells her that he is dying of pancreatic cancer. Dr Legg asks Dot to help him plan his funeral, so they consult funeral director Jay Brown (Jamie Borthwick). Dr Legg mentions Judith's death in the war and tells Jay and Dot he wants to be buried next to her, but feels that his parents would want him to be buried next to them. Dr Legg then moves in with Dot.

On New Year's Day, Dr Legg has a drink with Dot and her lodger, Stuart Highway (Ricky Champ). Dr Legg had a photo of Judith in his wallet, which Stuart stole. After Dot has gone to bed, Dr Legg tells Stuart he got the wrong impression of him and apologises. Stuart gives him his wallet back and realises Stuart stole the photo of Judith.

Dr Legg and Dot visit his parents' grave but discover that their gravestone has been vandalised with antisemitic graffiti. Dr Legg and his Rabbi meet with the gang of youths who were responsible for the graffiti, they apologise. When Dr Legg returns home, he sees Stuart scrubbing a graffitied Swastika on the door. After this, Dr Legg goes into hospital as his cancer progresses.

On 15 February 2019, Sonia, who comes to bring Dr Legg home is shocked to hear him say that he does not want to return to Dot's house, however, he later changes his mind and returns though very frail. Later, Dot and Dr Legg watch a programme about the Battle of Cable Street, where Harold tells Dot how he met Judith there. As he reminisces about his time with Judith, he peacefully passes away with Dot by his side. As per Jewish customs, Dr Legg is buried the next day and Dot leads a memorial service for him with many, including Lofty and Mary, arriving to pay their respects to him.

== Reception ==
In 2020, Sara Wallis and Ian Hyland from The Daily Mirror placed Dr Legg 72nd on their ranked list of the best EastEnders characters of all time and called his 2019 send-off "special and well-deserved".

== See also ==
- List of fictional doctors
