= Donald Tandy =

English actor (1918–2014)

- Tandy in Scotland Yard, "The Square Mile Murder" (1960)
- Born: Donald Eric Tandy; 20 December 1918; London, England
- Died: 9 May 2014 (aged 95)
- Occupation: Actor
- Years active: 1948–1991
- Spouse: Diana Buckland (1947–2014; his death)
- Children: 1

Donald Eric Tandy (20 December 1918 – 9 May 2014) was an English actor who appeared in over a dozen films (usually in minor or uncredited roles) and several dozens of televisions shows during his career. He played potman Tom Clements in EastEnders from 1986 to 1988.

== Career ==
Tandy started his career in 1950 in the low-budget film Chance of a Lifetime.

He appeared in many television programmes including Man from Interpol, Scotland Yard, You Can't Win, The Avengers, The Saint, Danger Man, Sergeant Cork, Sherlock Holmes, The Troubleshooters, and Colditz.

Starting in 1986, he appeared in EastEnders as the Queen Vic potman Tom Clements. His last appearance was in 1988.

== Partial filmology ==
=== Film ===
- Chance of a Lifetime (1950)
- Hand in Hand (1960)
- Scotland Yard: Crossroads to Crime (1960), "The Square Mile Murder" (1960)
- The Middle Course (1961)
- Doomsday at Eleven (1962)
- Farewell Performance (1963)
- Edgar Wallace Mysteries: Playback (1962), Game for Three Losers (1965)
- Twenty-One (1991) – Bobby's father (last appearance)

== Television ==
- Sunday Night Theatre (2 episodes, 1950–1959)
- Redgauntlet (1 episode, 1959)
- Man from Interpol (2 episodes, 1960)
- ITV Play of the Week (1 episode, 1960)
- The Winter's Tale (1962)
- The Avengers (1 episode, 1962)
- Hancock (1 episode, 1963)
- The Saint (1 episode, 1963)
- Suspense (2 episodes, 1963)
- Dr. Finlay's Casebook (1 episode, 1963)
- Sergeant Cork (2 episodes, 1966)
- Sherlock Holmes (1 episode, 1968)
- Mogul (1 episode, 1969)
- Softly Softly (2 episodes, 1966–1970)
- Dixon of Dock Green (2 episodes, –1974)
- Out of the Past (1 episode, 1974)
- Brendon Chase (2 episodes, 1981)
- Weekend Playhouse (1 episode, 1984)
- EastEnders (1986–1988)
