= Aftab Sachak =

British actor

- Born: July 16, 1952 (age 73)

Aftab Sachak (born 16 July 1952) is a British actor. He went to an English public school before studying acting.

He made his television debut in King of the Ghetto in 1986 and played the serious minded shop keeper, Ashraf Karim, in the BBC soap opera, EastEnders (1988–1990). Since leaving EastEnders he has appeared in the BBC comedy Waiting for God (1993), Brothers in Trouble (1995), Call Red (1996), Out of Sight (1996–1998), The Bill (1999), Hope & Glory (2000), The League of Extraordinary Gentlemen (2003) and Second Generation (2003) among others. On stage, Sachak's has appeared in Ayub Khan-Din's production of East Is East at the Octagon Theatre, Bolton, in 2005.

Whilst appearing in EastEnders, Sachak was declared bankrupt after incurring gambling debts, which led to him being evicted from his home.
