= Philip Brook =

British tennis administrator

Philip Brook CBE (born 18 February 1956) is a British tennis administrator. He served as chairman of the All England Lawn Tennis and Croquet Club from 2010 to 2019.

== Biography ==
He attended the Queen Elizabeth Grammar School in Wakefield, before studying mathematics at Fitzwilliam College of the University of Cambridge. Following university Brook became a trainee actuary in 1977 with M&G Reinsurance before joining R. Watson and Sons (later Watson Wyatt Worldwide, now Willis Towers Watson) in 1991. He became a partner of the firm in 1992. He retired from Willis Towers Watson in June 2009 having been a Global Practice Director of their Insurance and Financial Services Practice since 2003. He has been a Fellow of the Institute of Actuaries since 1984. Brook resides in Woldingham in Surrey. He is married to Gill with whom he has two daughters. He was appointed a CBE in the 2019 Queen's Birthday Honours for services to tennis.

== Tennis ==
He was part of the University of Cambridge team in the Varsity Match in 1975-77 and captained the side in 1977. In 1976 Brook played in the Prentice Cup in 1976 and was the Yorkshire men's singles champion in 1978 and represented Yorkshire in competitions until 1990. Since 1977 he has been a member of the International Lawn Tennis Club of Great Britain and was the club's Teasurer from 1986 to 2001. Brook served as Captain of the International Club of Great Britain in 1993 and has been a member of the Prentice Cup Committee.

=== All England Lawn Tennis and Croquet Club ===
Brook helped operate the scoreboards at the Wimbledon Championships at the All England Lawn Tennis and Croquet Club as a student in his summer holidays. He was elected a member of the club in 1989. He joined the Club Committee and Committee of Management of the Championships in December 1997. He served as vice-chairman of the club before being appointed chairman in 2010. His tenure as chairman concluded in December 2019. Brook helped develop the club's Wimbledon Master Plan which was launched in 2013. His tenure saw the creation of a three-week break between the French Open and the championships at Wimbledon to create a longer grass court season. The Wimbledon Foundation charity was launched during his chairmanship and the club bought their broadcasting, retail and hospitality in-house. Brook's tenure saw the prize money to players who exit in the first round of the championships greatly increased from £11,000 to £45,000. A retractable roof was built over No. 1 Court as part of his development plans.

Brook was accidentally hit by Andy Murray's wristbands that he threw into the crowd at the end of his second round match against Robin Haase at the 2015 championships. Brook then gave them to Queen Camilla who was sat next to him. Marion Bartoli credits a comment by Brook who was concerned for her health in being pivotal in her recovery from anorexia. Brook had told her that he was worried about her playing in a masters event at Wimbledon as he feared she might have a heart attack on court. In May 2017 Brook condemned Ilie Năstase who was accused of racism after comments he made about the unborn child of Serena Williams. Brook confirmed that Năstase would not be invited to the Royal Box on Centre Court that year. On 6 July 2019 in the Royal Box, Brook presented Rod Laver with a half-size replica of the Challenge Cup to mark the 50th anniversary of Laver's second Grand Slam in 1969.

The All England Club bought Wimbledon Park Golf Club in 2018 for £120 million as part of their long term expansion plans. Brook described the sale as a "hugely significant moment" for the All England Club and the Championships. The All England Club had acquired the freehold of the golf club site in 1993 from Merton Council and were due to own the site outright in 2041 before the 2018 sale. Brook had told the members of the golf club that if the £65 million offer had been rejected the All England Club had no intention of making another offer. He also said that the golf club should not assume it would receive £1 million in exchange for being used as a car park during the duration of the Championships. The Masterplan for the future development of the club and the championships was launched in 2019. In his introduction for the prospectus for the masterplan Brook wrote that "standing still is not an option" and that the club was "widely regarded as the finest stage in world tennis" due to the work of the club's initial Long Term Plan.
