= Ross Davidson =

Scottish actor (1949–2006)

- A publicity photo of Davidson as Andy in EastEnders, 1985
- Born: William Russell Davidson; 25 August 1949; Airdrie, Lanarkshire, Scotland
- Died: 16 October 2006 (aged 57); Frinton-on-Sea, Essex, England
- Years active: 1979–2005
- Agent: Keith Bishop
- Spouse(s): Elizabeth Ross (1972–1975); Barbara Black (2005–2006)

William Russell "Ross" Davidson (25 August 1949 – 16 October 2006) was a Scottish actor best known for his role as Andy O'Brien in the BBC soap opera EastEnders.

== Career ==
Davidson started his working life as a physical education teacher in Scotland in the early 1970s. He also played water polo at international level for Scotland. He left teaching to run a pub and disco in Glasgow, but furthered his ambitions to act by attending night classes.

He made his screen acting debut on television in A Degree of Uncertainty (1979), a BBC Play for Today set in a Scottish university, then appeared as a kilted dancer in Stanley Baxter on Television (1979). He also had small parts as a member of a mime troupe in The Comedy of Errors ("BBC Television Shakespeare", 1983) and a photographer in Widows II (1985), as well as appearing in the film The Pirates of Penzance (1983) and the Monty Python short The Crimson Permanent Assurance (1983), made to accompany the group's feature The Meaning of Life. In Spain, the Netherlands and Germany he was seen in commercials for products ranging from chewing gum to beer.

In 1985 he became one of the original cast of the BBC's flagship soap opera EastEnders. He played the altruistic nurse Andy O'Brien for 18 months, after which his screen alter-ego was the first main character to be killed off, dying in a road accident in August 1986.

Just before he left EastEnders Davidson recorded a pop single, "Jigsaw Puzzle", that failed to chart. He then returned to acting in stage plays (he had previously appeared in Guys and Dolls at the National Theatre) and returned to the small-screen in 1987 as a television presenter. He presented the BBC lunchtime magazine show Daytime Live (1987–88) and the sports challenge series Run the Gauntlet (1989–90).

Davidson later returned to acting and appeared in the Channel 4 soap opera Brookside and in the Welsh soap Pobol Y Cwm. He also played the role of Peter O'Dell in the Scottish soap Take the High Road for three years. He starred as Andy Morgan in the Channel 4 soap opera Hollyoaks from 1999 to 2002.

== Personal life ==
Davidson's first marriage was to a primary school teacher, but it ended within three years. He took his ex-wife's maiden name, Ross, as his stage name.

While he was working on EastEnders Davidson began a relationship with Shirley Cheriton, who played his on-screen girlfriend Debbie Wilkins. The couple separated after five years. He had a son with his second wife, Barbara Black, before they married in 2005. They lived together in the Essex resort of Frinton-on-Sea. Black had three children from her previous marriage.

== Illness and death ==
In February 2005 Davidson was diagnosed with a brain tumour, and swiftly underwent surgery. It was unsuccessful and a month later he was readmitted to the Oldchurch Hospital in Romford, where he was told that he had a glioblastoma Grade 4, the fastest-growing and most invasive form of brain tumour. In July 2005 Davidson went public with the news that his tumour was inoperable and that his life expectancy was 12–18 months. He died on 16 October 2006, aged 57.

== Filmography ==
Year	Title	Role	Notes
1983	The Pirates of Penzance	Pirate	
1983	Monty Python's The Meaning of Life		(segment The Crimson Permanent Assurance)
