= Tanveer Ghani =

British actor

Tanveer Ghani is a British actor. He has appeared in various British television programmes and British films.

One of his first roles was in the BBC hospital drama, Angels (1982). He is perhaps best known for playing the role of Rezaul Kabir in the BBC soap opera EastEnders from 1986–1987.

Other credits include Boon (1986); How to Get Ahead in Advertising (1989); Bhaji on the Beach (1993); Goodnight Sweetheart (1993); Love Hurts (1994); The Knock (1997); playing Ron in Gimme Gimme Gimme (2000); Bend It Like Beckham (2002); The Bill (2002); The Inspector Lynley Mysteries (2003); Steel River Blues (2004); The Golden Hour (2005), Dracula (2006) and Badla(2019)

== Filmography ==
- Badla (2019)
- Viceroy's House (2017)
- Amar Akbar & Tony (2015)
- Rules of the Game Part One (2008)
- The Bill [02/10/2002] (2002)
