= Shreela Ghosh =

British actress

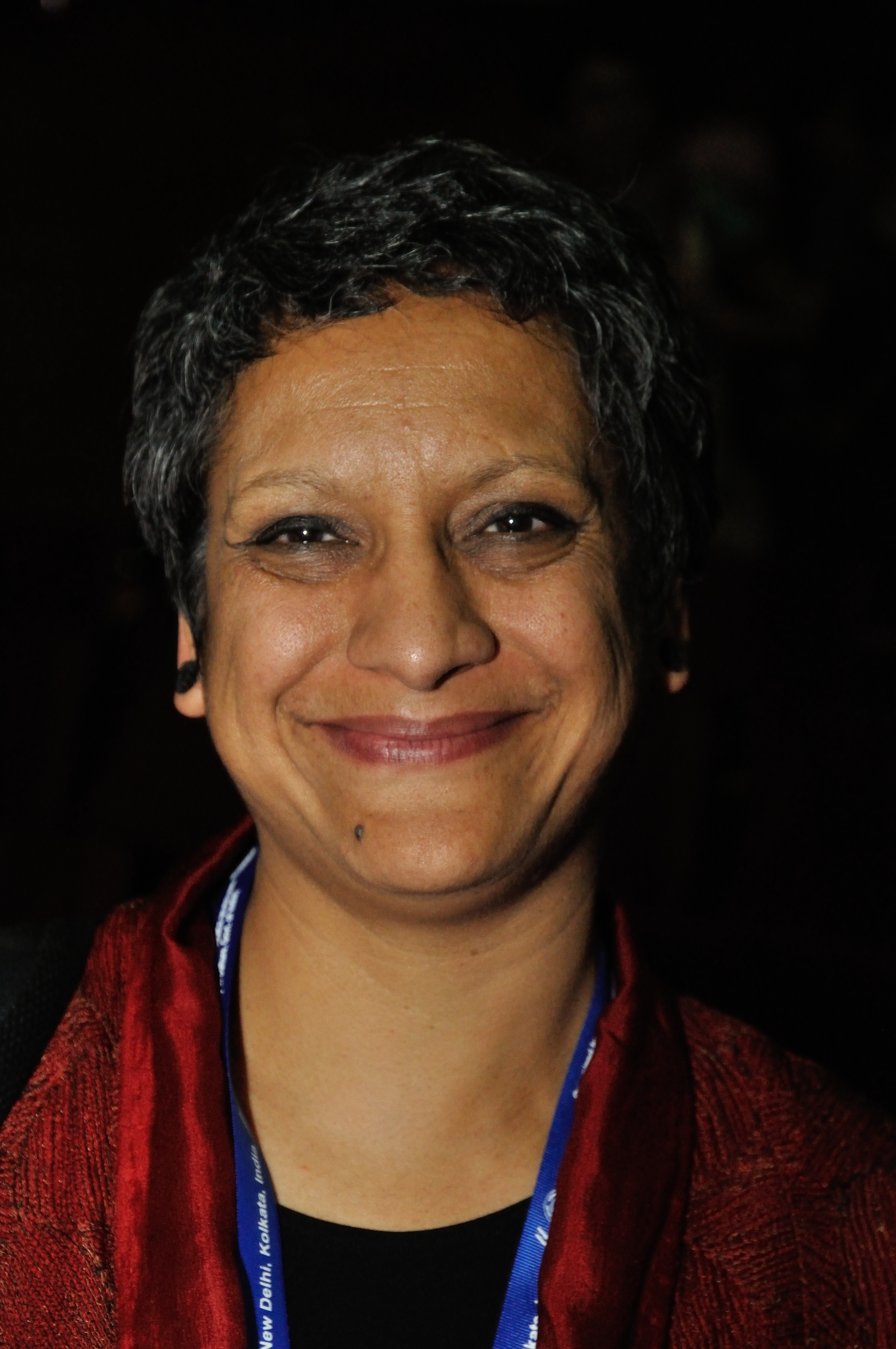
- Born: 25 September 1962 (age 64); Shillong, Assam, India
- Occupations: Former actress, dancer and reporter
- Years active: 1981-1987
- Known for: Role of Naima Jeffery in EastEnders
- Television: EastEnders

Shreela Ghosh (born 25 September 1962) is a former dancer, actress and reporter, became publicly known in the United Kingdom when she was cast as Naima Jeffery in 1985, one of the original characters in the BBC soap opera EastEnders. She has since given up performing to work as an arts executive. She was the first programme director for Arts and Heritage at the Esmee Fairbairn Foundation, and went on to become the deputy director for the Institute of International Visual Arts (InIVA). She now is the Director of the Free Word Centre.

== Career ==
Ghosh began her working life as a performer, a classical (Bharatanatyam and Kathak) Indian dancer and singer. At the age of seventeen – after acquiring an agent and an equity card — she worked extensively in theatre, which included work with leading organisations such as Max Stafford-Clark's Joint Stock Theatre Company where she was also working as Marketing and Publicity Officer. Television work followed with roles in Play for Today productions The Garland in 1981, and Moving on the Edge in 1984. She also had roles in the BBC nursing drama Angels (1982) and played Minnie in the successful televised ITV mini-series The Jewel in the Crown in 1984. Although Ghosh was not trained as an actor in a conventional sense, her coaching in voice and the dramatic techniques she had learnt from Indian dance came into play for many of her roles.

Ghosh continued her television career in 1985 when she was cast as Naima Jeffery, one of the original characters in the BBC soap opera EastEnders. Naima and her husband Saeed (Andrew Johnson) were the first Asian characters to appear in the programme, an ethnic minority that had previously been under-represented in British soap. Their inclusion was also a well-intentioned attempt to reflect the cross-section of multi-cultural society that existed in the East End of London. Ghosh remained in the series till 1987.

After leaving EastEnders, Ghosh grew disillusioned with acting, partly due to the frustration of being typecast in stereotypical Asian roles. She re-trained as a reporter through a successful application to an action scheme run by the BBC News and Current Affairs department in Pebble Mill, Birmingham. Throughout 1990 and 1991, she reported on programmes such as Midlands Today, Newsroom South East and South Today, and she then went on to make documentaries.

Two years later, she became the director of a national dance agency named Aditi (then the national organisation for South Asian dance), which was based in Yorkshire, before moving from arts management to arts funding by joining the Arts Council of England when the Capital Programme was rolled out in 1994.

Five years later, Ghosh was appointed Head of Arts for the London Borough of Tower Hamlets. She then moved to the Esmee Fairbairn Foundation, which is one of the largest independent grantmaking foundations in the UK. Ghosh became the foundation's first programme director for Arts and Heritage. From 2003 to 2005, she served on the Fellowship Committee at NESTA (National Endowment of Science Technology & Arts), and she took a position as a Trustee of the European Cultural Foundation.

In October 2006, Ghosh worked on the launch exhibition for the Louise T Blouin Institute in west London, which boasts 35,000 square feet (3,300 m^{2}) of galleries, studios and space for community projects and held an inaugural exhibition by renowned contemporary artist James Turrell. She also became a board member on the Cultural Leadership Programme – a two-year £12 million initiative to promote excellence in management and leadership within the cultural sector – launched by Chancellor of the Exchequer Gordon Brown in June 2006 and chaired by the M&C Saatchi founding director David Kershaw.

In 2007, Ghosh worked as deputy director for the Institute of International Visual Arts (InIVA). The organisation focuses on introducing the public to artists from culturally diverse backgrounds, by way of exhibitions, publications, multimedia, education and research projects.

As of 2009, Ghosh has moved on to work as the Director of the Free Word Centre, which works to promote literature, literacy and freedom of expression.

== Personal life ==
Although born in South Asia, Ghosh left Bengal when she was eleven and moved to England, where she has lived ever since. She has several children and has admitted to being a sufferer of post-natal depression. One of her children was born in 1985, and her character, Naima, was written out of EastEnders for a few months in order for her to have the baby. In the on-screen story, Naima walked out on Saeed after she learnt a few unsavoury things about his character.

While she was working as a liaison officer at the Arts Council she undertook an MA degree in European cultural policy and administration at the University of Warwick on a part-time basis and in 2005 she began a course in history of art at Birkbeck University.

== Filmography ==
Filmography
Year	Title	Role	Notes
1981	Play For Today	Amina	Episode: "The Garland"
1982	Angels	Yasmin	
1984	Play For Today	Amina	Episode: "Moving on the Edge"
1984	The Jewel in the Crown	Minnie	
1985	Me and My Girl	Female Doctor	Episode: "Dangerous Corner"
1985–1987	EastEnders	Naima Jeffery	
