= Leonard Fenton =

British actor (1926–2022)

- Fenton as Harold Legg in EastEnders
- Born: Leonard Finestein; 29 April 1926; Stepney, London, England
- Died: 29 January 2022 (aged 95); Hillingdon, London, England
- Education: King's College London; Webber Douglas Academy of Dramatic Art
- Occupations: Actor; director; painter
- Years active: 1958–2019
- Television: EastEnders (1985–1997, 2000, 2004, 2007, 2018–2019)
- Spouse: Madeline Thorner (m. 1967, separated)
- Children: 4

Leonard Fenton (né Finestein; 29 April 1926 – 29 January 2022) was an English actor, director and painter, best known for his role as Harold Legg in EastEnders.

== Early life ==
Fenton was born Leonard Finestein in Stepney, the son of Fanny (Goldberg) and Morris Feinstein, a women's garment maker. His parents were Ashkenazi Jews with ancestral roots in Eastern Europe (Riga in Latvia and Lithuania). He attended Raine Foundation Grammar School from 1937 to 1944. Fenton originally trained to be a civil engineer at King's College London and during World War II he was conscripted as an army engineer. He worked in this profession for five years after leaving the army, but eventually decided on a career change. He took up acting and won a scholarship to attend the Webber Douglas Academy of Dramatic Art in London.

== Career ==
His career in acting spanned over sixty years. One of his earliest acting breaks came when he was offered a role by Orson Welles in his play Chimes at Midnight. Subsequent acting credits include: Studio Four (1962); Colditz (1974); Secret Army (1977); Z-Cars (1978); Play for Today (1981); Auf Wiedersehen, Pet (1983), and Shine on Harvey Moon (1982), where he played the Austrian Jew, Erich Gottlieb. In the theatre, Fenton played the role of Willie to Billie Whitelaw’s Winnie in Samuel Beckett’s Happy Days at the Royal Court Theatre in 1979, directed by Beckett himself.

Fenton was best known for playing Harold Legg, one of the original characters in the BBC soap opera, EastEnders. The character appeared from the show's inception in 1985 until 1997, returning for brief stints in 2000, 2004, 2007 and 2018 until 2019. The character was originally one of the main focal points of the programme, but after 1989 he became less central. After the character's retirement in 1997, Fenton's appearances in EastEnders were infrequent. He made a single appearance in 2004 at the funeral of Mark Fowler, and in June 2007 to counsel Dot Branning regarding her concerns about Romanian 'foundling' baby, Tomas.

Fenton's subsequent television credits included Rumpole of the Bailey; So You Think You've Got Troubles (1991); Love Hurts (1993) and The Bill (1985; 2001; 2005), among others. In the West End, he performed in two productions by Lindsay Anderson, Anton Chekhov's The Seagull and Ben Travers' last play, The Bed Before Yesterday. He performed in many radio plays, including The Hobbit as the Elvenking, and The Lord of the Rings as Daddy Twofoot, both for BBC Radio 4. Amongst Fenton's other broadcasting work was the BBC webcast of the Doctor Who story Death Comes to Time. On 17 February 2006, he made a personal appearance on the Channel 4 entertainment show, The Friday Night Project. His film credits included roles in Up the Creek (1958), The Devil-Ship Pirates (1964), Robin Hood Junior (1975), Give My Regards to Broad Street (1984), Morons from Outer Space (1985), and the British horror movie The Zombie Diaries (2006).

In December 2004, at the age of 78, Fenton made his directorial debut with After Chekhov, written by four contemporary writers Allen Drury, Martin Jago, Andrew Neil and Olwen Wymark in the 100th anniversary year of Chekhov's death. The piece, produced by Little London Theatre Company was performed in the Soho Theatre Studio. In 2012 and again in 2013, Fenton appeared in a production of Cross Purpose, directed by Stephen Whitson at the King's Head Theatre, London.

On 25 July 2018, it was confirmed that Fenton would reprise his role as Dr. Harold Legg in EastEnders in late 2018. This stint lasted until 15 February 2019, when the character died after a long battle with pancreatic cancer.

== Personal life ==
Fenton and cellist Madeline Thorner married in 1967. They had four children and later separated. Aside from acting, he was also a professional painter and held several exhibitions. Before the 2010 general election, Fenton came out in support of the Labour Party, after appearing in their election broadcast.

== Death ==
He died in Hillingdon, London, on 29 January 2022, at the age of 95. His former co-star June Brown memorialised him as "a charming man in all ways, first as a person and then as an actor, extremely polite and kind".

== Filmography ==
=== Film ===
| Year | Title | Role | Notes |
|---|---|---|---|
| 1958 | Up the Creek | Policeman | |
| 1959 | Breakout | Prison Officer | Uncredited |
| 1959 | Third Man on the Mountain | | Uncredited |
| 1964 | The Devil-Ship Pirates | Quintana | |
| 1974 | Brown Ale with Gertie | Charles Gubbins | Short film |
| 1975 | Robin Hood Junior | Messenger | |
| 1975 | The Virtuoso | Hazard | Television film |
| 1978 | Panic | Policeman | Short film |
| 1984 | Give My Regards to Broad Street | Company Accountant | |
| 1985 | Morons from Outer Space | Commissionaire | |
| 1998 | Miracle at Midnight | Magnus Abrams | Television film |
| 2005 | The Bridge | Simon | Short film |
| 2005 | Shalom | Grandad | Short film |
| 2006 | The Zombie Diaries | Bill | |
| 2007 | Underground | Terry Page | |

=== Television ===
| Year | Title | Role | Notes |
|---|---|---|---|
| 1960 | Hotel Imperial | Porter | Episode: "The Leopardess in 424" |
| 1960 | Scotland Yard | Detective Sergeant Halloran | Episode: "Interpol" |
| 1960 | Here Lies Miss Sabry | Cabbie | Episode: "The Right People" |
| 1962 | Studio 4 | Police Superintendent | Episode: "The Intrigue" |
| 1962 | BBC Sunday-Night Play | Mr. Johnson | Episode: "A Child in the House" |
| 1963 | Moonstrike | Gendarme | Episode: "The Factory" |
| 1964 | Catch Hand | Brickie | Episode: "It's Only Bricks and Mortar" |
| 1966 | Mrs Thursday | Vincent | Episode: "The Sitting Tenant" |
| 1967 | Half Hour Story | Tom | Episode: "Hawks and Doves" |
| 1967 | The Gamblers | Max | Episode: "Oil and Water" |
| 1970 | Diamond Crack Diamond | Taxi Driver | Episode: "Not for Sale" |
| 1971 | Owen, M.D. | Reporter | Episode: "A Country Pursuit" |
| 1972 | The Brothers | Walpole | Episode: "A Worm In The Bud" |
| 1973 | Play for Today | Maths Master | Episode: "Speech Day" |
| 1973 | New Scotland Yard | Station Sergeant | Episode: "Property, Dogs & Women" |
| 1973 | Second City Firsts | Hymie | Episode: "Patrons" |
| 1973 | Beryl's Lot | Milkman | Episode: "Entente Cordiale" |
| 1973 | Jackanory Playhouse | King | Episode: "The Long-Nosed Princess" |
| 1974 | Colditz | Unterfeldwebel Ernst Krueger | Episode: "The Gambler" |
| 1974 | Justice | Sidney Ryman | Episode: "Duty of Care" |
| 1974 | Fall of Eagles | Mirkov | Episode: "The Secret War" |
| 1974 | The Early Life of Stephen Hind | Edouard | Episode: "Episode 1" |
| 1975 | A Legacy | Friedrich Merz | Miniseries; 5 episodes |
| 1977 | Secret Army | Driver | Episode: "Child's Play" |
| 1978 | The Law Centre | Superintendent | Episode: "Fly Away, Peter, Fly Away, Paul" |
| 1978 | Z-Cars | Detective Superintendent Holiday | Episode: "Prey" |
| 1979 | Play for Today | Hostage | Episode: "A Hole in Babylon" |
| 1979 | The Fourth Arm | Corporal Jack 'Miff' Moffat | Recurring role; 7 episodes |
| 1979 | Blue Peter Special Assignment | Lockwood Kipling | Episode: "Rudyard Kipling at Bateman's" |
| 1980 | Maria Marten, or The Murder in the Red Barn | Doctor | Miniseries; 3 episodes |
| 1981 | Play for Today | Mr. Smith | Episode: "A Brush with Mr. Porter on the Road to El Dorado" |
| 1984 | Auf Wiedersehen, Pet | German Proprietor | Episode: "The Fugitive" |
| 1984 | The Brief | Herr Braun | Episode: "And Then Where Do You Go?" |
| 1984–1985 | Shine on Harvey Moon | Erich Gottlieb | Recurring role; 11 episodes |
| 1985 | The Bill | Mr. Lee | Episode: "The Sweet Smell of Failure" |
| 1985–1997, 2000, 2004, 2007, 2018–2019 | EastEnders | Harold Legg | Series regular; 279 episodes |
| 1988 | Armada | Quotation Narrator | Miniseries; 2 episodes |
| 1991 | So You Think You've Got Troubles | Rabbi Glick | Recurring role; 2 episodes |
| 1993 | Love Hurts | Rabbi Zeidel | Episode: "For a Few Dollars More" |
| 1998 | Wogan's Web | Doctor | Episode: "Episode 14" |
| 2001 | The Bill | Archie Dodds | Episode: "Lifelines" |
| 2005 | The Bill | Sammy Pearl | Episode: "Closing Ranks" |
| 2011 | Doctors | Mr. Mendelson | Episode: "The Last Angel Cake" |
