= Nej Adamson =

British actor

- Born: Nejdet Salih; 23 December 1958 (age 67); London, England
- Occupation: Actor

Nej Adamson (born 23 December 1958), also credited as Nejdet Salih, is a British actor.

== Career ==
Born in London, Adamson is of Turkish Cypriot descent. He played Ali Osman in the BBC soap opera, EastEnders, a role he played from the series' inception in 1985 until 1989. During his time on the show his character battled with the loss of a child, gambling addiction, the breakdown of his marriage to Sue (Sandy Ratcliff) and her subsequent mental health problems. During EastEnders he was credited as Nejdet Salih, but after his departure in 1989, he changed his name to Nej Adamson.

Other television credits include Auf Wiedersehen, Pet, Doctor Who, Wall of Silence and in 2004 he appeared in the comedy sketch show Bo' Selecta!, where he played his EastEnders alias, Ali Osman, in a spoof sketch. He also featured in the 1992 film Carry On Columbus and in 2003 he played a short sailor in the Disney film Pirates of the Caribbean: The Curse of the Black Pearl and its sequel Pirates of the Caribbean: Dead Man's Chest (2006).

Adamson believes he has been typecast due to his role in EastEnders. On the show's 25th anniversary in 2010, he commented, "I have had to live with Ali for 25 years. I'm just trying to get on with my life. I don't give interviews. I am still acting but it is hard when to everyone I'm still Ali from the cafe."

== Personal life ==
During the 1980s, he dated Linda Davidson, his co-star on EastEnders who played Mary Smith. Adamson married his drama school sweetheart, Susan Stevens, in 1989. The marriage ended in 1990 when Adamson briefly moved to Hollywood.

== Filmography ==
=== Film ===
Year	Title	Role	Notes
1992	Carry On Columbus	Fayid	
2004	Wall of Silence	Mustafa	Television film
2006	Pirates of the Caribbean: Dead Man's Chest	Short Sailor	
2017	American Assassin	Turkish Operative	
2018	Sleep Warm	Grandpa	Short film
2020	Heckle	Stage Manager	

=== Television ===
Year	Title	Role	Notes
1983	Auf Wiedersehen, Pet	Turkish Site Worker	Episode: "Home Thoughts from Abroad"
1984	The Brief	Sergeant	Episode: "Can Kill, No One to Kill"
1984	Big Deal	Taxi Driver	Episode: "Some You Win..."
1985	Doctor Who	Juan	Episode: "The Two Doctors"
1985–1989	EastEnders	Ali Osman	Series regular; 363 episodes
1992	The Bill	Nico Theodorakis	Episode: "A Nice Little Line in Plastic"
2004	Bo' Selecta!	Ali Osman	Episode: "The Bear Takes Over"
