= Shirley Cheriton =

British actress (born 1955)

- Born: 28 June 1955 (age 71); London, England
- Occupation: Actress
- Notable work: Debbie Wilkins in EastEnders

Shirley Cheriton (born 28 June 1955) is an English actress. She is best known for her roles as Debbie Wilkins in the BBC soap opera EastEnders and her portrayal of Miss Prescott in the Are You Being Served? follow up, Grace & Favour. She played Pat, a pupil, in series 6 of Please Sir!.

Cheriton was born in London. Her EastEnders role ran from her arrival in the Square in March 1985 until her character's departure with Detective Terry Rich (Gary Whelan) in May 1987. Her character was Walford's original middle-class yuppie, and was known for her stormy relationship with the Scottish nurse, Andy O'Brien (Ross Davidson). Cheriton left her first husband for Davidson, but their relationship ended after five years.

Her other television credits include Angels, in which she played Katy Betts/Smart in one of EastEnders creator Julia Smith's earlier projects and M.I.T.: Murder Investigation Team in 2003. She also appeared as schoolgirl Pat in 3 episodes of Please Sir! in 1971, and as Naomi Grant in the 1977 ATV TV series Raven, opposite Phil Daniels. Her other TV appearances included roles in Granada Television's Crown Court in 1974, in The Woman Least Likely, the 1974 TV series Rooms, 2 episodes of Softly, Softly: Task Force in 1975, the Special Offer episode of the 1976 horror anthology series Beasts, the 1978 miniseries Will Shakespeare, and episodes of The Cuckoo Waltz, Sykes,Three Up, Two Down, and FM.
