= Sandy Ratcliff =

English actress, model, and counsellor (1948–2019)

- Ratcliff as Sue Osman in EastEnders
- Born: Alexandra Margaret Ratcliff; 2 October 1948; Islington, England
- Died: 7 April 2019 (aged 70); London, England
- Occupations: Actress; model; counsellor
- Years active: 1970–1994

Alexandra Margaret Ratcliff (2 October 1948 – 7 April 2019) was an English actress, model and counsellor. She made an impression as a model and film actress in the 1970s, but she became known for being one of the original cast members of the BBC soap opera EastEnders in the 1980s. She portrayed the role of Sue Osman but left the role in 1989. In 2010, she revealed that she had retired from acting to train as a counsellor.

== Early life ==
Alexandra Margaret Ratcliff was born on 2 October 1948 in Islington, London. The daughter of an insurance salesman, had a turbulent youth. After being expelled from school at the age of 12, within two years she was heavily smoking cannabis, and she later went on to serve time in prison for selling it. She had numerous jobs before she took up acting, including waitressing, disc-jockeying and performing as a guitarist in the rock groups Tropical Appetite and Escalator.

== Career ==
Ratcliff's career changed direction at 23, when she made a big impression as a model and was cast as "The face of the '70s" by royal photographer Lord Snowdon. This later facilitated a move into film. Her first major role was in the Ken Loach BAFTA-nominated film Family Life (1971), in which she played a schizophrenic teenager. This was followed by roles in slightly less well-received films including The Final Programme (1973), Yesterday's Hero (1979) and Hussy (1980) with Helen Mirren. She also appeared in Chris Petit's British road movie Radio On (1979). Ratcliff subsequently acted in several television productions including Minder, Couples, Play for Today, Target, The Sweeney, Shoestring and Shelley, and on stage in 1981 in the Ray Davies/Kinks musical, Chorus Girls.

She became a household name in 1985, as Sue Osman in the BBC serial EastEnders. She played the long-suffering wife of highly-strung cafe owner and mini-cab boss Ali Osman (Nejdet Salih). During her four years in the series, her character contended with cot death, infidelity and finally insanity. Off-screen Ratcliff was struggling with a publicised heroin addiction and she was written out of the show in 1989.

Her television appearances after EastEnders were in 1992's Maigret opposite Michael Gambon, and in the BBC2 productions A Box of Swan (1990) and Men of the Month (1994).

In later life, Ratcliff retrained as a counsellor, and drove ambulances; in 2010, it was reported she "eke(d) out a living doing part time jobs", and was living "in a run-down ground floor flat on a busy road in North London".

== Personal life ==
Ratcliff married photographer Peter Wright in Kensington, London in 1968. They broke up and by 1973 she had her only son, William, by theatre director Terence Palmer.

In 1991, her then boyfriend Michael Shorey stood trial at the Old Bailey after he was accused of killing two women. Despite Ratcliff giving him an alibi (she claimed in the witness box that they were making love at the time) he was found guilty and is now serving two life sentences for murder. His court case was to be her last public appearance.

In later life, Ratcliff no longer used heroin and lived on a £70 a week disability allowance. She suffered three strokes and was diagnosed with cancer.

== Death ==
Ratcliff died in her sleep and her body was found on 7 April 2019. She was 70 years old. In October 2019, the coroner's court attributed her death to taking an excessive amount of morphine due to a terminal lung condition.

== Filmography ==
Year	Title	Role	Notes
1971	Family Life	Janice Baildon	Film
1973	The Final Programme	Jenny	Film
1973	Centre Play	Girl	1 episode
1974	Crossroads	Barbara Wells	7 episodes
1974	Marked Personal	Paula Barry	2 episodes
1975	Whodunnit?	Rikki Howard	1 episode
1975	The Sweeney	Liz Jenner	1 episode
1976	Couples	Sally Knott	9 episodes
1976	BBC2 Playhouse	Mimi	1 episode
1977	ITV Playhouse	Lana Cork	1 episode
1977	Target	Angie Dawson	1 episode
1978	Hazell	Mrs O'Rourke	1 episode
1978	Play for Today	Mum	1 episode
1978	Touch and Go	Charmaine	Main role
1979	Radio On	Kathy	Film
1979	Danger UXB	Rosalyn	1 episode
1979	Kids	Carmen Fox	1 episode
1979	Shoestring	Mel Shepherd	1 episode
1979	Yesterday's Hero	Rita	Film
1979	Premiere	Muriel	1 episode
1980	Hussy	Olympia	Film
1980	The Gentle Touch	Ruby	1 episode
1982	Minder	Barbara	1 episode
1982	Doll's Eye	Maggie	Film
1982	Shelley	Sandra	1 episode
1982	BBC2 Playhouse	Alice	1 episode
1983	The Balance of Nature	Julie	Television film
1985–1989	EastEnders	Sue Osman	Series regular; 271 episodes
1990	Debut on Two	Patricia	1 episode
1992	Maigret	Ernestine Jussiaume	1 episode
1994	Screen Two	Meg	1 episode
