= List of EastEnders characters introduced in 1985 =

EastEnders' logo

A photo of most of the main characters and animals who first appeared in EastEnders in 1985

The following is a list of characters that first appeared in the BBC soap opera EastEnders in 1985, by order of first appearance. They were all introduced by executive producer Julia Smith. The first episode of EastEnders was broadcast on 19 February 1985, and twenty-three main characters were already created for their first appearance. The first character to be seen was Den Watts, followed by Ali Osman and then Arthur Fowler, all of whom find Reg Cox dying in his flat. Ethel Skinner, Harold Legg and Pauline Fowler appear, after Den alerts them of Reg's death. With Ethel is her pug Willy along with Lou Beale. Saeed and Naima Jeffery are seen working in the local shop whilst Angie Watts is seen in The Queen Victoria, Walford's local pub. Nick Cotton and Sue Osman are next seen, whilst Pete and Kathy Beale work at the fruit and veg stall and Hassan Osman is seen with his parents in the café. Sharon Watts, Ian Beale and Michelle Fowler are next seen and Mark Fowler is seen going into the bookies. Lastly, Roly the dog is seen in the pub when a fight breaks out.

Lofty Holloway is introduced on 26 February along with Terry Rich, and Tony Carpenter is introduced on 28 February. Mary Smith and her daughter Annie are introduced on 5 March. Tony's son Kelvin is introduced on 12 March. Andy O'Brien is introduced on 21 March along with Debbie Wilkins. Chris Smith was introduced on 7 May and Mehmet Osman was introduced on 13 June as a recurring character. Hannah Carpenter arrived on 25 June as Tony's wife and Dot Cotton was introduced on 4 July followed by Ernie Mears on 16 July. Detective Sergeant Roy Quick was introduced on 20 August as Walford's detective. Martin Fowler was born on 30 July and Simon Wicks arrived on 5 October. Lastly, the wife of Mehmet, Guizin Osman arrived on 22 October, and Cassie Carpenter arrived as the daughter of Hannah and Tony.

== Den Watts ==
Den Watts, played by actor Leslie Grantham, is the original landlord of The Queen Victoria. He became well known for his tabloid nickname, "Dirty Den". He is perhaps best remembered for his stormy love-hate relationship with his alcoholic first wife Angie (Anita Dobson), as well as his devoted interaction with their adopted daughter Sharon (Letitia Dean). After nearly 20 years of marriage, he hands divorce papers to Angie in the 1986 Christmas Day episode that was watched by a record-breaking 30.15 million viewers, more than half of the UK population at the time. The character soon departed from the show after getting involved with his local's criminal organization, The Firm – which sparked the events of an attempt on Den's life. For 14 years, it was believed that he had been killed, but he returns to Walford in September 2003. Seventeen months later, his character is killed off again – this time for good – at the hands of his manipulative second wife Chrissie (Tracy-Ann Oberman), on the show's 20th anniversary episode that was watched by over 1/3 of the UK population at the time. Den was described by EastEnders executive producer Louise Berridge as being arguably one of the most iconic characters ever portrayed in a soap opera.

== Ali Osman ==
Ali Osman, played by Nejdet Salih, is a happy-go-lucky, easy-going chap, in stark contrast to his highly strung wife, Sue (Sandy Ratcliff). He has a compulsive addiction to gambling, which gets him into trouble on more than one occasion and his marriage ends in disaster after he has his wife sectioned. He is a member of the original EastEnders cast, appearing in the first episode on 19 February 1985, and remains with the show for nearly five years afterwards, making his final appearance on 10 October 1989. Ali Osman was one of the original twenty-three characters invented by the creators of EastEnders, Tony Holland and Julia Smith. Ali, a Turkish Cypriot, was originally intended to be named Chris. His name was changed to Ali when it dawned on Holland that he had given a Christian name to a Muslim. Ali was a well-intentioned attempt to represent the proportion of Turkish Cypriots who had immigrated to England and settled in the East End of London. Holland and Smith knew that for the soap to succeed there needed to be a varied group of characters, so that several different sections of the audience had someone to identify with.

== Arthur Fowler ==
Arthur Fowler, played by Bill Treacher, is the father of the Fowler family. Arthur is essentially a good man, but makes some foolish choices and always ends up paying dearly for them. Bossed to the brink of insanity by his wife Pauline (Wendy Richard) and mother-in-law Lou Beale (Anna Wing), Arthur falls into the arms of another woman. During his time in Albert Square he suffers with a mental disorder, is sent to prison twice and eventually dies of a brain haemorrhage in 1996. Arthur Fowler was one of the original twenty-three characters invented by the creators of EastEnders, Tony Holland and Julia Smith. Arthur is a member of the first family of EastEnders, the Beales and Fowlers, and Holland took the inspiration for some of the series' earliest characters from his own London family and background. Arthur's original character outline as written by Smith and Holland appeared in an abridged form in their book, EastEnders: The Inside Story.

== Reg Cox ==
Reg Cox
- EastEnders character
- Portrayed by: Johnnie Clayton
- Appears in: Episode 1 "Poor Old Reg"; 19 February 1985
- Book appearances: Home Fires Burning, Swings and Roundabouts
- Spin-off appearances: "CivvyStreet"

Reg Cox, played by Johnnie Clayton, is a resident of Albert Square. The first episode of EastEnders on 19 February 1985 centres upon pensioner Reg's death. According to scriptwriter Colin Brake, the creators of EastEnders, Tony Holland and Julia Smith, wanted to start the serial "with a bang, throwing the audience into the middle of life in [the fictional setting of] Walford". The Reg Cox storyline was deemed as a good starting point, allowing various members of the community to be involved with or comment on the circumstances of the old man's murder.

In the first ever scene of the programme, the characters of Den Watts (Leslie Grantham), Arthur Fowler (Bill Treacher), and Ali Osman (Nejdet Salih) are shown breaking down the door of Reg's flat. In Holland and Smith's book, The Inside Story, the authors have outlined their original interpretation of the scene: "[EastEnders] starts with a bang, as a size ten boot kicks down the door that's locked from the inside. The tiny, dirty and foul-smelling council-flat behind the battered door belongs to Reg Cox (known locally as "the-old-boy", and a cantankerous bastard at the best of times) who hasn't been seen around [Albert Square] for days.... Once the door's down, three men rush into the gloomy main-room.... They find the old boy sitting in his favourite armchair beside the gas fire (which isn't on) – and he's very nearly dead.... By the end of the episode the old boy will have been removed from the square and taken to Intensive Care, and the entire community will be rife with gossip, which spreads round the houses like the plague. Via the gossip we're able to piece together the events leading up to the discovery of Reg."

Reg lived alone at 23b Albert Square. On the morning of 19 February 1985, Naima Jeffery (Shreela Ghosh), who runs the shop on Bridge Street, becomes concerned about Reg after he has failed to make his daily milk purchase for the past three days, and her husband, Saeed Jeffery (Andrew Johnson), mentions this to Den Watts (Leslie Grantham), publican of the pub next door. Den and Arthur Fowler (Bill Treacher) rouse Ali Osman (Nejdet Salih), who lives downstairs from Reg, to let them into the house and the three of them kick in the door to Reg's room when he fails to answer their knocking. Den speaks the opening lines of the first episode, "Stinks in here, dunnit?", followed by the discovery of an unconscious Reg slumped in his armchair in the lounge of his neglected flat. Den runs to get the local doctor, Harold Legg (Leonard Fenton), and calls for an ambulance. On 21 February 1985, they learn that Reg had been severely beaten and died from injuries which had gone unnoticed when he was found. It is eventually revealed that Nick Cotton (John Altman) was behind the beating when he was attempting to steal Reg's war medals.

Reg, who was 59 years old when he died, was not a popular figure in Albert Square. He is referred to as a 'cantankerous old man' by Arthur, called a 'miserable so and so' by Ethel Skinner (Gretchen Franklin) and a 'nasty old man' by his downstairs neighbour, Sue Osman (Sandy Ratcliff). However, despite this, Lou Beale (Anna Wing) causes havoc around the Square, accusing Sue of neglect for allowing him to lie dying in his flat for days, without checking up on him. The character also appears in the Christmas special "CivvyStreet", set during the Second World War, shown on 22 December 1988.

In 2014, Reg's murderer, Nick, uses the name 'Reg Cox' as an alias after faking his own death. In 2015, Nick dies in the same place that Reg died exactly 30 years earlier, after admitting to his mother, Dot Branning (June Brown), that he killed Reg.

== Ethel Skinner ==
Ethel Skinner played by Gretchen Franklin, is an elderly resident of Walford. An EastEnders original character, Ethel came in the soap's early years often found wandering the square with her adored pug Willy. She and Dot Cotton (June Brown) are lifelong friends, and although they wind each other up they are dependent on each other. In fact Ethel trusts Dot so much that she even asks her to help her die in 2000, after she is diagnosed with inoperable cancer. Ethel's original character outline states that she was born in 1920. However, during the series this was altered to 1916 and for many years her birthday fell on 19 February. When Ethel comes back to Walford to die in 2000, she reveals to Dot that she had lied about her age for many years.

Ethel, like Reg Cox, also features in the 1988 "CivvyStreet" special, in which the character is played by Alison Bettles.

== Pauline Fowler ==
Pauline Fowler played by Wendy Richard between 1985 and 2006 is the wife of Arthur Fowler (Bill Treacher). Pauline was created by scriptwriter Tony Holland and producer Julia Smith as one of EastEnders' original characters. She makes her debut in the soap's first episode on 19 February 1985, and remains for twenty-one years and ten months, making her the second longest-running original character, surpassed only by Ian Beale (Adam Woodyatt). Pauline was a staple in the UK press during her time in EastEnders, representative of the symbiosis between Britain's soaps and tabloid newspapers. Widely read tabloids, such as The Sun and Daily Mirror, would routinely publish articles about forthcoming developments in Pauline's storylines. Critical opinion on the character differs. She has been described as a "legend" and a television icon, but was also voted the 35th-"most annoying person of 2006" (being the only fictional character to appear on the list). The character is well known even outside the show's viewer-base, and away from the on-screen serial, Pauline has been the subject of television documentaries, behind-the-scenes books, tie-in novels and comedy sketch shows.

== Harold Legg ==
Dr. Harold Legg, played by Leonard Fenton, is Walford's original GP. He is widely trusted within the community, and is always on hand to dish out advice. Dr Legg appears as a regular character between 1985 and 1989, but continues to appear in a recurring role until 1997. He was officially retired in 1999 by executive producer Matthew Robinson, though he has made cameos since this time in 2000, 2004 and 2007 and returned one final time in late 2018, before the character was killed off in early 2019. Dr. Harold Legg is one of the original twenty-three characters invented by the creators of EastEnders, Tony Holland and Julia Smith. Dr. Legg is an attempt to represent the successive wave of Jewish immigrants that had settled in the East End of London between 1881 and 1914 in order avoid the persecution that they were being subjected to in Europe. The second generation of East End-born Jews (as Dr. Legg was meant to represent) prospered in the area until the 1930s when Oswald Mosley's British Union of Fascists was formed, and used violence to instil fear in the Jewish population. As the Jewish community grew wealthier, many moved out of the East End to more affluent areas of London, just as the character of Dr. Legg had done on-screen when the show began; living in Islington, but commuting to his practice in Walford.

== Saeed Jeffery ==
Saeed Jeffery, played by Andrew Johnson, is the original owner of the First til Last grocery store. He is never truly accepted in Walford, and his arranged marriage ends in divorce after it is discovered that he had been making obscene phone calls to women. He leaves Walford in disgrace, leaving his business to his wife. Saeed Jeffery is one of the original twenty-three characters invented by the creators of EastEnders, Tony Holland and Julia Smith. Saeed and his wife Naima (Shreela Ghosh) are the first Asian characters to appear in the soap. Black and Asian characters were two ethnic minorities that had previously been under-represented in British soap before EastEnders aired. Holland and Smith knew that for the soap to succeed there needed to be a varied group of characters, so that several different sections of the audience had someone to identify with.

== Pete Beale ==
Pete Beale, played by Peter Dean, makes his first appearance in the programme's first episode, on 19 February 1985. The character was created by Tony Holland, one of the creators of EasEnders; he was based on a member of Holland's family. Pete features in the soap for eight years as the local fruit and veg trader of Albert Square; he is a member of the original focal clan in the serial, the Beales and Fowlers. Pete is portrayed as a macho and somewhat insensitive individual who struggles to cope with emotion. Pete was axed from the soap in 1993 and departed in May that year after over eight years on-screen. The character was killed off-screen later that year following Peter Dean's public criticism of the BBC.

== Lou Beale ==
Lou Beale played by Anna Wing, is the matriarch of the Beale family. Lou Beale was the first EastEnders character to be created by series co-creator Tony Holland, taking the inspiration for some of the series' earliest characters from his own London family and background. Lou is the archetypal East End matriarch throughout EastEnders first three years. An intimidating force within the local community, she is the dowager of Albert Square's central family, the Beales and Fowlers. Never afraid to speak her mind, and woe betide anyone who manages to get on her wrong side, Lou has the respect of her friends and family, even if they do find her a bit of a nuisance at times. Born in the East End, Lou lived in Walford all her life. Albert and Lou came to their house on the corner of Albert Square, number forty-five, on getting married during the 1930s. Lou remained in the house throughout the Second World War and brought up her children there. Her affinity and ties with the area mean that she tends to view Albert Square as her own and that gives her an excuse to intrude into people's business as she sees fit.

The character is played by Karen Meagher in the 1988 EastEnders special, "CivvyStreet", set during the Second World War.

== Naima Jeffery ==
Naima Jeffery, played by Shreela Ghosh, is the wife of Saeed Jeffery (Andrew Johnson). Naima tries to embrace Western culture, but this is not easy since her family constantly try to force her to adhere to their ancient customs. Sick of being forced to live in an arranged marriage with a husband she loathes, Naima makes a stand and shames her family by filing for a divorce. Naima Jeffery is one of the original twenty-three characters invented by the creators of EastEnders, Tony Holland and Julia Smith. Naima and her husband are the first Asian characters to appear in the soap. Black and Asian characters were two ethnic minorities that had previously been under-represented in British soap before EastEnders aired. Holland and Smith knew that for the soap to succeed there needed to be a varied group of characters, so that several different sections of the audience had someone to identify with.

== Angie Watts ==
Angie Watts played by Anita Dobson, appears from the first episode of the show until 1988 when the actress decided to quit and the character was written out. Angie is well known for her cheeky banter, her huge shaggy perm and turning to alcohol during her stormy marriage to cheating Den (Leslie Grantham) which ends when he hands her divorce papers on Christmas Day, in an episode watched by a record-breaking 30.1 million viewers. Despite being the loud and feisty lady of Walford, and having a close relationship with her beloved adopted daughter Sharon (Letitia Dean), she has little real happiness during her time in Albert Square and alcoholism finally claims her life in 2002 when she dies of cirrhosis of the liver. Angie Watts is one of the original twenty-three characters invented by the creators of EastEnders, Tony Holland and Julia Smith. The character of Angie was originally going to be named Pearl and she, her husband and adopted daughter were to be the occupants of the soap's local pub, now famously known as The Queen Vic. Holland, who had worked as a barman in his youth, called upon his own personal experiences to invent the Watts family and the pub they lived in. Holland and Smith had always been critical of the way pubs had been portrayed on television feeling they lacked vitality and life, so they were determined that their pub and occupants were going to be more 'real'. The Watts were seen by Holland as integral to the show's success, partly because he had already guessed that the pub was going to be a monstrous battleground where emotions would run high on a regular basis, and also because the occupants would be providing the majority of the drama.

== Willy ==
Willy is a Pug, who appears in the first episode of the programme and remained in the show until 1992. Willy was cast less than a week before the filming of EastEnders began. From the beginning it was decided that the pensioner Ethel Skinner (Gretchen Franklin) was to have a Yorkshire Terrier named Willy (after her dead husband). The company Janimals, who specialised in providing and training animals for television and films, was contacted by EastEnders co-creator/producer Julia Smith, and informed her that they could provide an experienced pug for the part (he had previously starred in an adaptation of Swallows and Amazons). The dog was brought to the studio to meet Gretchen Franklin, the actress who played Ethel. She took a shine to him straight away and so the pug was cast as Willy. Willy and Roly the poodle shared a dressing room at Elstree Studios.

== Roly ==
Roly is an apricot-coloured Standard Poodle, who appears in the first episode of the programme and remains in the show until 1993. Roly was cast less than a week before the filming of EastEnders began. From the beginning it was decided that the occupants of The Queen Victoria pub, Den, Angie and Sharon Watts, were to have an Alsatian named Prince. However, finding an Alsatian that was light enough in colour not to merge into the background of the set proved to be difficult. Eventually, the co-creator/producer of the show, Julia Smith, was contacted by a company named Janimals, who specialised in providing and training animals for television and films. They had found a seven-month-old Poodle, called Roly, who might still be young enough to be trained. Training was said to take three weeks, and as the Poodle was a similar size to an Alsatian, Roly got the part. Roly was made the property of the BBC, given an ID card, and taken to live with Julia Smith at her home in London. Roly and Willy the pug shared a dressing room at Elstree studios.

== Tracey ==
Tracey (known to fans as Tracey the barmaid) is played by Jane Slaughter. She has appeared as a background character since the first episode on 19 February 1985, when she was seen working on the flower stall in Bridge Street Market. Slaughter was not credited in the role until episode 126 (1 May 1986), which was the first episode in which she spoke. She is the longest-serving character and cast member in the show as Slaughter has been part of the show from the beginning without taking any breaks. She is also the longest-serving female member of the cast in terms of continuous appearances, as other original female cast members who are still in the cast as of 2024 have taken long-term breaks from the show.

== Nick Cotton ==
Nick Cotton, played by John Altman, is a recurring character who appears in the soap's debut episode in February 1985, through to his last appearance, in which he dies, in 2015. Nick is the son of characters Charlie (Christopher Hancock) and Dot Cotton (June Brown), and the father of Charlie Cotton, Ashley, and Dotty Cotton (Molly Conlin). His storylines saw him twice committed murder of Reg Cox and Eddie Royle respectively, succumb to a heroin addiction, and attempt to poison his own mother, causing the death of his son Ashley amongst numerous other misdemeanors. Nick is also the subject of a special spin-off episode, The Return of Nick Cotton, which aired in October 2000. He has been voted one of television's all-time most villainous characters in a Channel 4 poll. He is seen as the show's original villain. Nick dies of a heroin overdose on 13 February 2015 in the house in which he killed Reg Cox 30 years earlier.

== Sue Osman ==
Sue Osman, played by Sandy Ratcliff, is the wife of Ali Osman (Nejdet Salih). Sue is one of the serial's original characters, appearing in its first episode on 19 February 1985 and departing on-screen in May 1989. Created by Tony Holland and Julia Smith, Sue is portrayed as argumentative, insecure and tragic. A pivotal storyline in the character's narrative is the cot-death of her son, which is one of the show's first controversial plots. During her four years on-screen, the character contends with a phantom pregnancy, marital breakdown and finally insanity.

== Kathy Beale ==
Kathy Beale (also Mitchell, Sullivan and Cotton), played by Gillian Taylforth between 1985 and 2000, and then from 2015 onwards, is the mother of Ian Beale (Adam Woodyatt). Though it was never used on screen, in 2010 the BBC website named the character as Kathy Sullivan due to a marriage after she left the show in 2000. Kathy Beale is one of the serial's original characters, appearing in the first episode of EastEnders on 19 February 1985. One of the longest-running original characters, Kathy remains in a prominent role, covering issues such as rape and domestic violence until April 1998, when Taylforth quit. A year later, in 1999, Taylforth returned for a temporary stint to aid the departure of actor Ross Kemp who played her brother-in-law Grant Mitchell, and later in December 1999 for the wedding of her screen son Ian. She made her final appearance in January 2000. Despite various rumours of a possible return for Kathy in the press, this did not occur and the character was supposedly killed off-screen in a road accident in late February 2006 in a storyline to facilitate the return of her son Ben to his father Phil (Steve McFadden). In tribute to the character, the soap's café is named "Kathy's". Kathy returned for the 30th anniversary episode in February 2015, when it was revealed that Kathy never died in a surprise showdown with her ex-husband, Phil.

== Hassan Osman ==
Hassan Osman
- EastEnders character
- Portrayed by: Michael Evangelou
- First appearance: Episode 1 "Poor Old Reg"; 19 February 1985
- Last appearance: Episode 36; 20 June 1985
In-universe information
- Father: Ali Osman
- Mother: Sue Osman
- Brothers: Little Ali Osman
- Uncles: Mehmet Osman
- Aunts: Ayse Osman

Hassan Osman, played by Michael Evangelou, is the first son of Ali Osman (Nejdet Salih) and Sue Osman (Sandy Ratcliff), who is only a baby during his short time in EastEnders. Hassan dies in his sleep on 20 June 1985; no official causes of death are given. Sue is left in a state of shock after her son's death. She remains in a trance-like state for weeks and refuses to eat, sleep, cry or acknowledge her grief. She later begins blaming herself unfairly for her son's sudden death. Her mental health continues to deteriorate and she becomes despondent towards Ali and their marriage disintegrates in a welter of depression. Sue eventually manages to come to terms with Hassan's death with the help of Harold Legg (Leonard Fenton), who takes the drastic measure of placing Mary Smith's (Linda Davidson) baby, Annie Smith (Zara Posener), in her lap, finally allowing her to acknowledge her pent-up sadness.

=== Development ===
Before EastEnders initially aired, creators Tony Holland and Julia Smith had already decided that Sue and Ali Osman would be parents to a young baby named Hassan. However, as further characters were invented they realised that there would be a total of four babies in the show: Annie Smith (Zara Posener), Martin Fowler (Jon Peyton Price), Vicki Fowler (Emma Herry) and Hassan. It was decided that it would be impossible for the studios to cope with four babies and so they invented a storyline to eliminate one from the cast. During this time, the topic of sudden infant death syndrome was prominent in the British press, partly due to an increase in casualties, but also because a doctor had gone public with the accusation that parents were to blame for the tragic occurrence. Holland and Smith decided that covering this issue in the soap would be a good way of 'setting the record straight', and so it was decided that Sue and Ali's baby would die from cot death in the early months of the show. This was the first of many controversial storylines in EastEnders' history. After the storyline aired in June 1985, the show was praised by audience and press alike for the sensitive and unsensational way this harrowing subject was treated. The sudden tragedy came as a surprise to the audience, especially since the bereaved parents were a couple whose feuding, fighting ways had made them appear rather comic in the early episodes of the show. The British Cot Death Foundation initially feared that a soap opera would trivialise the subject and frighten new parents. They tried to stop the episodes from airing, but in the end they were pleased with the way the subject was handled, and provided back-up support after transmission to many viewers who wanted more information on the subject.

== Sharon Watts ==
Sharon Watts (also Mitchell, Rickman and Beale), played by Letitia Dean, is the daughter of Den (Leslie Grantham) and Angie Watts (Anita Dobson). Sharon is a regular character in the first 10 years of the programme, after which she leaves and returns several times. Sharon is the adoptive daughter of the popular 'supercouple'; Den and Angie. She was known to Den as his "princess" and he made sure suitors watched their step around the teenage Sharon. Even though she disapproved of her father's dodgy deals and his constant fighting with binge-drinker Angie, she loved them both nonetheless. She made a permanent return to the show in 2012.

== Ian Beale ==
Ian Beale, played by Adam Woodyatt originally appeared as a main character between 1985 and 2021. Woodyatt took an extended break from the show in 2021 and, after a couple of guest appearances in December 2022 and June 2023, he made a full time return in August 2023. He is the longest-serving main character and the only remaining original character to have appeared fairly continuously since the first episode on 19 February 1985. The character appeared in his 2,000th episode in the show on 26 March 2007. Ian Beale is one of the original twenty-three characters invented by the creators of EastEnders, Tony Holland and Julia Smith. Ian is a member of the first family of EastEnders, the Beales and Fowlers, and Holland took the inspiration for some of the series' earliest characters from his own London family and background. Ian's original character outline as written by Smith and Holland appeared in an abridged form in their book, EastEnders: The Inside Story.

== Michelle Fowler ==
Michelle Fowler (also Holloway), played by Susan Tully from 1985 to 1995 and Jenna Russell from 2016 to 2018, is the daughter of Arthur Fowler (Bill Treacher) and Pauline Fowler (Wendy Richard). Although she is one of the brighter people in Walford, that does not stop Michelle making some huge mistakes during her time in Albert Square. Michelle has a habit of choosing the wrong men and her stubborn nature means that she rarely accepts anyone's help or listens to good advice. She is tough, feisty, determined, outspoken and never afraid to defend herself or her beliefs. Early on in the series, the character of Michelle becomes central to the programme and is the focus of a controversial storyline involving her teenage pregnancy. Press interest in the show escalated to "record levels" as journalists continuously tried to predict who had fathered Michelle's baby. In whodunnit fashion, the audience had been kept in the dark as to the real identity of the father and were given teasers implicating several residents on The Square. The audience finally discovered the culprit in episode 66 of the programme, October 1985. The episode was written by series co-creator/script editor Tony Holland and directed by co-creator/producer Julia Smith, and was considered to be a landmark episode in the show's history. Four possible suspects are seen leaving the Square in the early half of the episode: Tony Carpenter (Oscar James), Ali Osman (Nejdet Salih), Andy O'Brien (Ross Davidson) and Den Watts (Leslie Grantham). As Michelle waits by their rendezvous point a car pulls up and finally the fluffy white legs of Roly the poodle bound out of the car, and give it all away: Den Watts is the man meeting Michelle and it was he who had fathered her baby. The rest of the episode consists of just one long scene, where Den and Michelle discuss whether or not to keep the baby. Up to that time it was the longest scene ever done in a soap opera, lasting fifteen minutes.

== Mark Fowler ==
Mark Fowler is an original regular character in the series starting February 1985 but becomes a semi-regular after his original portrayer David Scarboro was written out of the role in April 1985. Scarboro made brief returns to the role in 1986 and 1987; he committed suicide in April 1988. The role was recast with Todd Carty in 1990. From this point the character, played by Carty, became a permanent fixture in the series until being written out of the series in early 2003. Mark starts out as a delinquent teenager, but returns to Walford a changed man when he was 22. Contracting HIV forces him to grow up fast and accept his responsibilities. He frequently finds it difficult to accept the restrictions of the illness, which finally claims his life in April 2004.

== Lofty Holloway ==
Lofty Holloway, played by Tom Watt, is one of the serial's original characters, making his first appearance in the third episode, 26 February 1985. Lofty is generally depicted as a meek, luckless and hapless victim. A long-running storyline concerns his relationship with the character Michelle Fowler (Susan Tully). Their unhappy marriage finally disintegrates after Michelle has an abortion, and Lofty leaves Walford for a new start. The character's final appearance is in the episode first aired on 19 April 1988. Lofty was one of the original twenty-three characters invented by the creators of EastEnders, Tony Holland and Julia Smith. Both felt that to help complete the community there was a need for a character in his early twenties. He had to be someone a bit different – not brash and confident like a lot of the older men, and not boisterous like the younger ones; a loner, maybe someone forced to be a loner, a person who "stuck out like a sore thumb" – someone that was happiest in a group but still could not find one in which he fitted. Tony Holland had previously been in the army and found that ex-soldiers had these problems when they tried to reintegrate as civilians. So they decided that Lofty would be an ex-soldier, forced to quit because of his asthma. He was happiest in the army and felt incomplete without the group setting, the all-male camaraderie and even the security of the uniformity that the army provides.

== Terry Rich ==
Terry Rich
- EastEnders character
- Portrayed by: Gary Whelan
- Duration: 1985, 1987
- First appearance: Episode 3; 26 February 1985
- Last appearance: Episode 235; 14 May 1987
In-universe information
- Occupation: Detective
- Wife: Debbie Wilkins

DS Terry Rich, played by Gary Whelan, first appears in the series on 26 February 1985 and makes his last appearance on 14 May 1987. He investigates the death of Reg Cox (Johnnie Clayton), who died the previous week, and his death is believed to be a murder. Rich, of the Walford CID, arrives in Albert Square to conduct an inquiry.

The following week, a badge that Lofty Holloway (Tom Watt) is wearing on his jumper catches the eye of Dr Legg (Leonard Fenton), who recognises it as one that he saw in Reg's collection of Nazi badges from the war. A few hours later, Rich arrives at The Queen Victoria where Lofty is tending bar and questions him about how he got the badge. Lofty reluctantly admits that he bought it from Mark Fowler (David Scarboro) for five pounds. When questioned by Rich, Mark insists that he found the badge on the street. However, a month into the investigation, Rich learns that Mark had obtained the badge from Nick Cotton (John Altman) and ransacked Nick's home to find the remains of Reg's collection along with other incriminating evidence. Nick then flees Walford, but is arrested the following month for Reg's murder, although he is never charged.

Rich returns in 1987 to investigate the case of the 'Walford attacker', who has assaulted several female inhabitants of Albert Square. In April of that year, Debbie Wilkins (Shirley Cheriton), averts an attack using self-defence, which leads to the attacker's arrest. Rich is impressed with the way Debbie conducted herself so he asks her if she would help him out on some police business. Rich asks Debbie to go to a French restaurant with him on an undercover operation to expose French restaurants using English waiters. Debbie agrees, but whilst on their mock date they bond and when they return to The Queen Victoria they make a dinner date for the next night to a Chinese restaurant and they are soon inseparable. Debbie's flatmate, Naima Jeffery (Shreela Ghosh), seems to dislike Rich immensely, but this does not perturb Debbie, and when Rich asks her to marry him, she gleefully accepts. The following month Rich is transferred to another division in Crawley, so Debbie decides to leave Walford with him.

== Tony Carpenter ==
Tony Carpenter, played by Oscar James, is a jovial character, who tries to establish a successful business and steady home for his family, but nothing he does is ever good enough for his nagging wife. Tony is one of the original twenty-three characters invented by the creators of EastEnders, Tony Holland and Julia Smith. Tony was originally intended to be named Alan, and his son Kelvin Carpenter was originally named Kevin. They are the first black characters to appear in the soap. Black and Asian characters were two ethnic minorities that had previously been under-represented in British soap before EastEnders aired. Holland and Smith knew that for the soap to succeed there needed to be a varied group of characters, so that several different sections of the audience had someone to identify with. Additionally, if the programme was to be realistic, it had to reflect the cross-section of society that actually existed in the real location. For these reasons, different sexes, ages, classes, religions and races were all included in the original character line-up. Both Holland and Smith had been at the forefront of the move towards 'integrated casting' in television and had encountered an array of ethnic diversities in the process. Even though the ethnic minority groups were deemed the hardest to research, Holland and Smith called upon their contacts to relay information about their origins and lifestyles and were then able to portray Walford's most recent immigrants more realistically.

== Mary Smith ==
Mary Smith, played by Linda Davidson, is a punk, and Walford's original wild child. She often makes life difficult for herself due to her stubborn, defensive nature and she tends to feel that everyone around her is out to get her. In fact, Mary is her own worst enemy and most of her misfortune is down to her irresponsible behaviour and her inability to heed good advice. Mary Smith is one of the original twenty-three characters invented by the creators of EastEnders, Tony Holland and Julia Smith. Mary's original character outline as written by Smith and Holland appeared in an abridged form in their book, EastEnders: The Inside Story. As Holland and Smith wanted a diverse cross-section from the East End community, it was decided that one of the main cast had to be a young, single mother, and as punk music was prominent in British culture at the time, they decided to use a punk image for the character. Holland and Smith decided to cast an unknown actress in the role. They chose Linda Davidson, who was the right age and had been brought up in northern England and therefore had an accent that would befit the character's background.

== Annie Smith ==
Annie Smith
- EastEnders character
- Portrayed by: Zara Posener (1985–1986); Jenna Alembick (1985–1986); Samantha Crown (1986–1988); Marilyn O'Brien (2019)
- Duration: 1985–1988, 2019
- First appearance: Episode 5; 5 March 1985
- Last appearance: Episode 5871; 19 February 2019
- Created by: Tony Holland and Julia Smith
- Introduced by: Julia Smith (1985); John Yorke (2019)
In-universe information
- Occupation: Police officer
- Mother: Mary Smith
- Grandfathers: Chris Smith
- Grandmothers: Edie Smith
- Uncles: Brendan Smith

Annie Smith, played by Zara Posener and Jenna Alembick from 1985 to 1986 and by Samantha Crown from 1986 to 1988, is the young daughter of punk Mary Smith (Linda Davidson). Her father was a member of a punk group of which Mary was a groupie, and had no contact with her. Annie returned in 2019, played by Marilyn O'Brien.

Annie, who was born prematurely, is three months old when she arrives, along with Mary, on 5 March 1985 and initially resides with her mother at 23b Albert Square. Mary is an incredibly irresponsible mother and Annie is always getting lumbered on neighbours when Mary gets tired of looking after her. Dot Cotton (June Brown) and Sue Osman (Sandy Ratcliff) are the usual victims, but almost everyone on Albert Square has a turn of looking after Annie. Sue, in particular, grows extremely fond of Annie following the death of her son, Hassan Osman. After bottling up her grief for months, she is forced to hold little Annie, which finally allows her to acknowledge her pent-up sadness.

Annie is once left alone in the launderette by accident while Mary goes drinking in The Queen Victoria pub. Debbie Wilkins (Shirley Cheriton) finds her and returns her to her mother, along with a few choice words for Mary. Mary also has a tendency to leave Annie home alone whilst she goes out to prostitute herself at night. On one such occasion, Annie throws her blanket at the electric fan heater, causing a fire. Arthur Fowler (Bill Treacher) rescues her but as a result, Annie is removed from Mary's care and given to her grandparents, Chris Smith (Allan O'Keefe) and Edie Smith (Eileen O'Brien), who live in Stockport. With the help of Mary's boyfriend, Rod Norman (Christopher McHallem), and Carmel Jackson (Judith Jacob), Annie is eventually reunited with her mother, although it takes a lot of persuading to make Edie return her, as she feels that Mary is not capable of caring for a young child. Annie spends Christmas Day 1987 in hospital after Chris, who is drunk, abducts her in an attempt to take her back to Stockport and crashes his car into a wall, though Annie is unharmed. Eventually, Mary decides to leave Albert Square for good with Annie in May 1988.

Nearly 31 years later, Mary returns to Walford with Annie who is now 34 years old to attend the funeral of Dr Legg (Leonard Fenton). Whilst reminiscing with Dot, Lofty Holloway (Tom Watt) and Sharon Mitchell (Letitia Dean), Mary states that Annie works for the police force. They later light a candle in Dr Legg's memory before leaving Walford again.

== Kelvin Carpenter ==
Kelvin Carpenter, played by Paul J. Medford, is an original EastEnders character. A bright spark and full of initiative, he opens several businesses in Albert Square and even forms a band. He is a bit of a heartbreaker in the early years of EastEnders, but he eventually has his heart broken in return, when his middle-aged girlfriend jilts him. Always a bit too intelligent for Walford, Kelvin eventually leaves for university and has since married a model wife and has become a songwriter. Kelvin Carpenter was one of the original twenty-three characters invented by the creators of EastEnders, Tony Holland and Julia Smith. Kelvin was originally intended to be named Kevin, and his father Tony Carpenter was originally named Alan. They are the first black characters to appear in the soap.

== Andy O'Brien ==
Andy O'Brien, played by Ross Davidson, is one of the original characters created for the series. Andy makes his appearance one month after the show first broadcast in March 1985. Portrayed as altruistic and middle-class, Andy and his partner Debbie (Shirley Cheriton) are an attempt to represent gentrification of the East End. Despite Davidson claiming that there had been plans for his character, Andy became the first regular character in EastEnders to be killed off. Davidson claims this was due to an altercation between himself and Executive Producer and show creator Julia Smith. His death scene aired in August 1986.

== Debbie Wilkins ==
Debbie Wilkins, played by Shirley Cheriton, is Walford's first upwardly mobile character. She has an on/off relationship with her ill-fated boyfriend Andy O'Brien (Ross Davidson). Andy and she tend to be a bit too pretentious for the working class locals of Albert Square. Debbie Wilkins is one of the original twenty-three characters invented by the creators of EastEnders, Tony Holland and Julia Smith. The character of Debbie along with her boyfriend Andy are an attempt by Holland and Smith to represent the influx of upwardly mobile people that were opting to move to the usually working-class areas of the East End of London. Gentrification of the East End was on the increase in the 1980s, and in Holland's experience, the new, wealthier residents were never welcomed or truly accepted within the community, and this was what he hoped to convey on-screen with these two characters.

== Big Ron ==
Big Ron
- EastEnders character
- Portrayed by: Ron Tarr
- Duration: 1985–1997
- First appearance: Episode 18; 18 April 1985
- Last appearance: 2 December 1997
In-universe information
- Occupation: Market trader
- Nieces: Tina

Big Ron, played by Ron Tarr, works in Walford market and appears as a background character from 1985 to 1997. Ron's first line in the series is, "All right, Den?", said to Den Watts (Leslie Grantham), five months after Ron first appears. His first credited appearance is episode 177, dated 28 October 1986, when he witnesses Ali Osman (Nejdet Salih) and his brother, Mehmet Osman (Haluk Bilginer), arguing and asks Ali's wife, Sue Osman (Sandy Ratcliff), if she needs any help. He is credited in the episode as "stall holder" and this is also the first time he is named as Ron in dialogue. Ron is involved in a few storylines, including helping his friend Pete Beale (Peter Dean) to intimidate rapist James Willmott-Brown (William Boyde) into leaving the area, and having a heart attack after he is pushed by a mugger in the market. Richard Cole (Ian Reddington) gives Ron's pitch away, leading the other stall holders to rebel against him, until his boss orders him to give it back to Ron. In August 1994, Ron sells cheap wallpaper to Arthur Fowler (Bill Treacher), which falls off the walls overnight, so Arthur makes Ron help him put up new wallpaper. Ron joins The Queen Victoria football team as goalkeeper. He makes three saves during their first match, which they go on to win 2–0.

The actor Ron Tarr died of cancer in October 1997 and was appearing in pre-recorded episodes several weeks after his death. To explain the character's absence, he was given an off-screen storyline in early 1998 where he wins £500,000 on the National Lottery and emigrates to Spain. In a report about Tarr's death in the Daily Mirror, journalist Chris Hughes stated the character had "a cult following". Ron could have appeared in a special episode of the popular science fiction series Doctor Who, entitled Dimensions in Time (1993). The episode was specially created as part of BBC's annual fund-raising event, Children in Need. Viewers were asked to phone in and vote which EastEnders character, Mandy Salter (Nicola Stapleton) or Ron, would appear in the show and save The Doctor from certain death. Two versions were filmed for each voting outcome, but the Mandy version won with 56% of the vote.

== Chris Smith ==
Chris Smith
- EastEnders character
- Portrayed by: Allan O'Keefe
- Duration: 1985, 1987–1988
- First appearance: Episode 23; 7 May 1985
- Last appearance: Episode 364; 2 August 1988
In-universe information
- Occupation: Lorry driver
- Wife: Edie Smith
- Sons: Brendan Smith; Gary Smith
- Daughters: Mary Smith; Bridey Smith
- Granddaughters: Annie Smith

Chris Smith (initially credited as 'Man', then as Mary's father), played by Allan O'Keefe, is the father of Mary Smith (Linda Davidson). A haulage driver from Stockport, he is first seen in Walford in May 1985 when he comes to visit his wayward daughter. Mary (or Theresa as she was known to Chris) had left Stockport to escape her family, so she is not pleased when Chris arrives and tries to persuade her to return with him so he can help bring up her young daughter. After several ill-fated attempts, Mary sends him away.

In 1987, Mary begins prostituting herself. She leaves her young baby, Annie Smith, at home alone while she works. On one occasion, Annie throws a blanket out of her cot straight on to an electric fan heater, causing a fire. Annie is rescued but Mary's neighbour, Dot Cotton (June Brown), phones Chris, who returns to Walford and takes Annie to live with him and his wife, Edie Smith (Eileen O'Brien), in Stockport.

Mary's boyfriend, Rod Norman (Christopher McHallem), tries to help Mary sort her life out so she can get her daughter back. Even though Mary seems to be better, Edie has grown so attached to Annie that she is unwilling to relinquish care. By December, Chris finally decides that Annie should be reunited with Mary. Edie is unhappy about this and tells Chris that he can only come home when he brings Annie back. On Christmas Eve 1987, after desperately trying to convince Mary to return to Stockport, a very drunk Chris abducts Annie and tries to drive her home, only to crash into a wall at the local bed and breakfast on Bridge Street. Mary is forced to spend Christmas Day in hospital so Annie can be monitored. Chris desperately tries to make amends for his mistake, but she cannot forgive him until Annie is given the all clear later that day, so a jubilant Mary accepts her father's apology.

In early 1988, Chris makes plans to open up a haulage company at a disused tyre shop in Albert Square, but finds out that his driving licence is to be suspended for 18 months following his drink driving accident. Nevertheless, he contacts his friend, Harry Jameson (Anthony Dutton) to go into partnership and even manages to persuade Ali Osman (Nejdet Salih) to provide some capital. However, Ali pulls out of the deal and Chris turns to alcohol, regularly drinking himself into a stupor to drown his sorrows. A concerned Mary then decides to contact her mother, who returns to Walford to help her husband. By May, Chris succeeds in opening the haulage company open by borrowing money from Walford Investments – the money lending organisation of The Firm – but the antics of his daughter, who starts to use drugs again and neglect Annie, cause further family strife. In a bid to help Mary out, Chris offers her a job at the haulage company but Mary gets annoyed by her parents' interference, and after sabotaging her father's office with paint, she and Annie leave Walford.

Chris stays in Walford to run his business, employing Rod as a bookkeeper and Charlie Cotton (Christopher Hancock) as lorry driver, although he is extremely unreliable. However, Chris is still short of drivers, so he starts doing deliveries himself, despite having a suspended licence. Darren Roberts (Gary McDonald), who had had several run-ins with Chris regarding the theft of his JCB earlier that year, informs the police that he is driving illegally and Chris is fined £1000. This severely cripples his business and he is unable to repay his loan. Gregory Mantel (Pavel Douglas), a member of The Firm, then arrives on the Square, looking for Chris and forces him to sign the business over to The Firm, leaving Chris no choice but to return to Stockport. His last appearance is in August 1988. The premises of the haulage company are eventually bought by Frank Butcher (Mike Reid), who converts it into the car lot.

== Mehmet Osman ==
Mehmet Osman, played by Haluk Bilginer, is a recurring character appearing from 1985 to 1989. Mehmet is portrayed as a charmer, rogue and a serial womaniser. He was conceptualised by the creators of EastEnders, Tony Holland and Julia Smith. Mehmet, the brother of original character Ali Osman (Nejdet Salih), is part of a well-intentioned attempt to represent the proportion of Turkish Cypriots who had immigrated to England and settled in the East End of London. Holland and Smith knew that for the soap to succeed there needed to be a varied group of characters, so that several different sections of the audience had someone to identify with. Additionally, if the programme was to be realistic, it had to reflect the cross-section of society that actually existed in the real location. For these reasons, different sexes, ages, classes, religions and races were all included in the original character line-up. Both Holland and Smith had been at the forefront of the move towards 'integrated casting' in television and had encountered an array of ethnic diversities in the process. Even though the ethnic minority groups were deemed the hardest to research, Holland and Smith called upon their social contacts to relay information about their own origins and lifestyles, which they say allowed them to portray Walford's most recent immigrants more realistically.

== Hannah Carpenter ==
Hannah Carpenter
- EastEnders character
- Portrayed by: Sally Sagoe
- Duration: 1985–1987
- First appearance: Episode 37; 25 June 1985
- Last appearance: Episode 211; 19 February 1987
In-universe information
- Husband: Tony Carpenter
- Sons: Kelvin Carpenter
- Daughters: Cassie Carpenter

Hannah Carpenter, played by Sally Sagoe, is the former wife of Tony Carpenter (Oscar James). She is a religious woman who is active in the Pentecostal Church but lost all tolerance for her fun-loving husband. After they agreed to divorce, their son, Kelvin Carpenter (Paul J. Medford), moves to the Square to live with his father in February 1985, while their daughter, Cassie Carpenter (Delanie Forbes), stays with her mother. Hannah's first appearance in Walford is in June 1985 and throughout the year she shows up occasionally to converse with Tony about issues concerning their children. Hannah constantly looks down on Tony's lifestyle and career, so their meetings are never pleasant.

When Hannah meets the smooth talking corporate lawyer, Neville Agard (Gordon Case), she invites him to move into her house. Eventually, Neville buys the house and they announce their intention to wed. However, when she discovers that Neville has a violent temper and has beaten her daughter with a riding whip, she confronts him and after a row results in violence she leaves him and turns up on Tony's doorstep at number 3 Albert Square in April 1986. Tony is furious and goes to confront Neville, returning later covered in blood. Hannah is adamant that she will not return to Neville, so she and Cassie come to live with Tony and they decide to try to give their marriage another chance.

Their reconciliation is not a happy one and it is not long before Hannah had returns to her nagging ways. She is unhappy to be living in a house that is in the throes of renovation and she constantly harangues Tony to do better and try harder. She also manages to upset her children by trying to put a stop to her son's relationship with Carmel Roberts (Judith Jacob) and forcing Cassie to go to boarding school.

In 1987 Hannah begins to become disillusioned with Walford after getting accosted by both Rezaul Kabir (Tanveer Ghani) and Mehmet Osman (Haluk Bilginer). She is also stalked one night by a man known as the Walford attacker, who is guilty of assaulting several female inhabitants of the Square. Hannah is shaken but unharmed. She later relays to Tony that she fears that Mehmet is the culprit, because he had made a pass at her previously. Tony is furious, and he along with Den Watts (Leslie Grantham) and Pete Beale (Peter Dean) go to track Mehmet down and teach him a lesson. After Hannah witnesses her husband attacking Mehmet, she takes the moral high-ground and denounces his barbaric actions, despite previously being happy for Tony to resort to violence against Neville. Hannah then decides that their marriage is over and so she leaves Walford in February that year to go and live with her sister in another part of London. She is not seen again.

In 2022, Luke Weir from Surrey Live called Hannah the "nagging wife" of Tony.

== Dot Cotton ==
Dorothy "Dot" Branning (also Cotton), played by June Brown, is the mother of original character Nick Cotton (John Altman). In a special episode entitled "Dot's Story" (2003), a young Dot is played by Tallulah Pitt-Brown in flashbacks. Dot first appears in EastEnders in July 1985, and worked as a launderette assistant for most of that time along with original character Pauline Fowler (Wendy Richard). Dot moved away with her son and his family in 1993. In reality, Brown left the show in 1993, unhappy with the development of her character. Brown returned to the role in April 1997, and on 28 April 2017, Dot overtook Pat Butcher (Pam St Clement) as the second-longest-serving character in EastEnders, surpassed only by original character Ian Beale.

In April 2012, Brown took a six-month break from the show to write her memoirs. Dot temporarily departed on 18 May 2012. She returned on 14 January 2013. In February 2015, Dot began appearing less frequently due to Brown gradually losing her eyesight; this aspect of her life was written into her character the following year. In February 2020, Brown announced that her appearance in the previous month would be the character's last, as she was dissatisfied with the storylines being given to her. Following Brown's death on 3 April 2022, the character's off screen death was announced in the Queen Vic on 1 December 2022, following the character's death the previous night.

== Ernie Mears ==
Ernie Mears
- EastEnders character
- Portrayed by: Ken Wynne
- First appearance: Episode 43; 16 July 1985
- Last appearance: Episode 52; 15 August 1985
In-universe information
- Occupation: Boxing coach

Ernie Mears, portrayed by Ken Wynne, wooed Ethel Skinner (Gretchen Franklin) during the Second World War but after she married his good friend William Skinner (Ian Brimble), he disappeared from their lives. Many years later, Ernie confesses to Ethel that he fled because he feared that he would either go insane being around an unobtainable Ethel, or that they would do something to hurt William if their association had continued.

When Ian Beale (Adam Woodyatt) becomes interested in learning to box in July 1985, Ethel joins him on his first trip to the gym, as boxing is her favourite sport. Ian's boxing coach, a retired light heavyweight champion, turns out to be Ernie, who at first thinks Ethel was Ian's mother.

Upon learning that it is Ethel and that she is now widowed, Ernie asks her on a date and a few weeks later asks her to marry him. However, the offer is conditional. Ernie is allergic to dogs and Willy the pug, Ethel's constant companion for the past 9 years, would have to go. Ethel seriously considers Ernie's offer but gently declines, after which Ernie departs broken hearted again. His last appearance is on 15 August 1985.

== Martin Fowler ==
Martin Fowler, played by Jon Peyton Price from 1985 to 1996, James Alexandrou from 1996 to 2007 and James Bye since 2014, is the younger son of Pauline Fowler (Wendy Richard) and Arthur Fowler (Bill Treacher), born in July 1985. His considerably older siblings are Mark Fowler (David Scarboro and later Todd Carty) and Michelle Fowler (Susan Tully and Jenna Russell). Martin is the first baby to be born in the serial. His grandmother Lou (Anna Wing) is extremely fond of him, and insists that he is named after her late husband Albert. Pauline and Arthur are against this, and for several months the baby remains unnamed, although Lou continues to refer to him as Albert. The baby's name is finally revealed as Martin Albert Fowler at his christening in October 1985, which satisfies Lou. Martin grows up facing numerous family upsets, including his father's mental breakdown and imprisonment and his parents' temporary separation in 1993, which Martin takes badly. As Martin ages he becomes surly and increasingly troublesome.

== Detective Sergeant Quick ==
Detective Sergeant Quick
- EastEnders character
- Portrayed by: Douglas Fielding
- Duration: 1985–1986
- First appearance: Episode 53; 20 August 1985
- Last appearance: Episode 146; 10 July 1986
In-universe information
- Occupation: Detective Sergeant

Detective Sergeant Roy Quick, played by Douglas Fielding, is a police detective who appears in 51 episodes from episode 53, first shown on 20 August 1985, to episode 146, originally broadcast on 10 July 1986. The character was EastEnders's first regular character to be police officer.

He arrives in Albert Square to put his old adversary, Nick Cotton (John Altman), in prison. He fails at this, but finds the woman he wants to marry, Debbie Wilkins (Shirley Cheriton), who is seeing Andy O'Brien (Ross Davidson) in an open relationship. Quick tries to woo Debbie, sending her bouquets of flowers. Andy becomes jealous of their friendship and tries to make them feel as uncomfortable as possible.

After a few months of platonic dating, Quick asks Debbie to marry him. Wanting to stay independent, Debbie turns him down, but Quick continues to pester her, saying that if he was married, it would improve his career. Eventually, Debbie ends the relationship and reunites with Andy. Quick then investigates a burglary at Dr Legg's (Leonard Fenton) surgery, for which he blames the victim for leaving a window open, and he angers the locals when he appears to be accusing innocent people, especially teenagers, of taking drugs. Debbie's rejection adds to Quick's dissatisfaction with the course his life has taken. He feels he is in a dead-end career with the police force and so he decides to leave to work for a security firm. Dr Legg then questions Quick's priorities, pointing out that the crime rate never went down since he arrived, so Quick accuses them of not helping the police, and his parting remarks to the citizenry in The Queen Victoria pub are, "You lot deserve each other, and you deserve what you've got, and what you've got is only the start!" His last appearance is in July 1986.

== Simon Wicks ==
Simon Wicks, generally known as Wicksy, played by Nick Berry, appears between 1985 and 1990. Wicksy was introduced to take on some of the more adult storylines that had been scripted for another character, Mark Fowler; Mark's actor David Scarboro had left the serial prematurely due to personal problems. Wicksy was the soap's first male pin-up, and proved extremely popular with female fans. An early storyline sees Wicksy perform a song in the serial, "Every Loser Wins", which was subsequently released as a single in 1986 and reached number one in the UK singles chart. One of Wicksy's most prominent storylines is Cindy Beale's (Michelle Collins) adultery with him, and a subsequent feud with Cindy's husband Ian (Adam Woodyatt). Nick Berry quit the role in 1990, fearful of typecasting, and after five years on-screen, Wicksy departed in December that year. Berry briefly reprised the role on 13 January 2012 following Pat's death.

== Sheena Mennell ==
Sheena Mennell
- EastEnders character
- Portrayed by: Dulice Liecier
- First appearance: Episode 69; 15 October 1985
- Last appearance: Episode 81; 26 November 1985
In-universe information
- Occupation: Stripper

Sheena Mennell, played by Dulice Liecier, first appears on 15 October 1985 when her taxicab breaks down in Bridge Street and she wanders into the café and asks Sue Osman (Sandy Ratcliff) where she might find another one. Sue tells her that her husband, Ali (Nejdet Salih), might be able to take her where she needs to go and so Mary Smith (Linda Davidson), who is in the café at the time, offers to show her the way to Number 23 Albert Square in search of Ali.

When Ali cannot be found, Mary invites Sheena to wait in her flat above and they quickly become friends. Sheena had once been in a similar situation to Mary when she found herself pregnant and alone, although she opted to abort the baby, which she had always regretted. Mary is impressed that Sheena earned £150 per week as a stripper. Weary of trying to live on the DSS payments she receives, Mary eagerly accepts Sheena's offer to help her find work as a stripper. Sheena also gives Mary dancing lessons.

Whilst out working, Mary leaves her daughter, Annie, in Sheena's care, but she is caught by Sue 'entertaining' a man in Mary's room with Annie in close proximity. Sheena then leaves Annie alone while she goes for a drink in The Queen Vic with her guest. When Mary finds out about Sheena's behaviour she calls her a "sluttish bitch" and tells her that Annie could end up in care because of her irresponsible actions. This is the last time Sheena was seen.

== Guizin Osman ==
Guizin Osman
- EastEnders character
- Portrayed by: Ishia Bennison
- Duration: 1985–1989
- First appearance: Episode 71; 22 October 1985
- Last appearance: Episode 430; 21 March 1989
In-universe information
- Occupation: Café owner
- Husband: Mehmet Osman
- Sons: Rayif Osman; Murat Osman
- Daughters: Emine Osman

Guizin Osman, played by Ishia Bennison, is the long suffering wife of the philandering Turkish Cypriot, Mehmet Osman (Haluk Bilginer). She first arrives in Albert Square in October 1985 when she comes to inform her sister-in-law, Sue (Sandy Ratcliff), that her husband, Ali (Nejdet Salih), had gambled away the mortgage money for the home they were planning to buy.

Guizin and her three children, Emine (Pelin Ahmet), Rayif and Murat, later move in with her brother-in-law and his family in 1987, after her husband gambles away their home and deserts them. She works for Ali and Sue in the café for a few months until her husband returns and she becomes a partner in the business. As part owner of the café, she hires Ian Beale (Adam Woodyatt), who later becomes the sole owner.

Guizin and Mehmet's marriage is highly turbulent and they are always involved in intense arguments, mainly concerning money and gambling. Guizin is well aware of Mehmet's flaws and adultery, but unlike Sue, she is willing to turn a blind eye to most of her husband's dealings to keep the marriage together because, in her community, that's what a wife is expected to do. Guizin may put up with a lot from Mehmet, but she is certainly no pushover, and is more than willing to defend herself and her family if anyone should cross her. She has numerous rows with Sue over the years and she nearly comes to blows with Donna Ludlow (Matilda Ziegler) after she informs her that Mehmet had been trying to seduce her on New Year's Eve 1987. Yet more animosity arises when she discovers that Mehmet has been sleeping with prostitute Mary Smith (Linda Davidson), but although Guizin gets extremely angry, she ends up forgiving Mehmet for the sake of the family. However, there is one affair that Guizin is not willing to forgive Mehmet for, and it happens to be the only one that he did not actually have. After Sue discovers that Ali had slept with Donna Ludlow, she kisses Mehmet in front of Ali for revenge, causing a huge fight between the brothers. Ali tells Guizin about Sue and Mehmet's suspected affair, making Guizin furious. She viciously attacks Mehmet in the middle of the Square and leaves for Northern Cyprus, taking her children with her. Her last appearance is in March 1989. Mehmet leaves England soon after to attempt to patch up their relationship.

Bennison has "mixed memories" about her role in EastEnders, commenting in 2003: "it was the start of the soap and the fame was very instant for everybody. You're in everybody's front room and everyone feels they own a bit of you. I'll never forget having to sign people's sickbags on the hovercraft to France. My daughter wouldn't walk down the street with me at the time. She would stay 10 paces behind. I still get recognised from EastEnders. I can't believe it."

== Cassie Carpenter ==
Cassie Carpenter
- EastEnders character
- Portrayed by: Delanie Forbes
- Duration: 1985–1986
- First appearance: Episode 78; 14 November 1985
- Last appearance: Episode 195; 25 December 1986
- Book appearances: Growing Pains
In-universe information
- Occupation: Student
- Father: Tony Carpenter
- Mother: Hannah Carpenter
- Brothers: Kelvin Carpenter

Cassie Carpenter, played by Delanie Forbes, made her first appearance on 14 November 1985. She is the daughter of Hannah Carpenter (Sally Sagoe) and Tony Carpenter (Oscar James) and the younger sister of Kelvin Carpenter (Paul J. Medford). In an early episode, before Cassie appears, she is referred to as being 14 years old, but when Cassie is introduced, she is 11 years old.

Cassie's parents are separated and she initially resides with her mother and her mother's new boyfriend, a corporate lawyer named Neville Agard (Gordon Case). Cassie first appears in November 1985 when she comes to visit her father in Albert Square. Cassie loves her father and finds her parents' separation difficult, particularly as she does not get on with Neville.

In April 1986, Hannah and Cassie arrive on Tony's doorstep with the disturbing news that Neville has been beating Cassie with a riding whip. After Tony fights with Neville, both Hannah and Cassie then come to live in Walford with Tony and Kelvin, and Cassie is delighted when her parents have decided to give their marriage another chance.

Cassie is a mischievous youngster who, like her brother, is bright. In May 1986 she gets into trouble with her school for bullying another girl, and is in even more trouble with her parents for trying to hide it from them. Tony later catches her smoking cannabis, which she has stolen from Owen Hughes (Philip Brook), a friend of Mark Fowler's (David Scarboro). Tony is furious and the Carpenters refuse to speak to any of the Fowler family because of it. After a subsequent meeting with Cassie's headmaster, Hannah decides that the only solution is to send Cassie away to boarding school. Cassie is against the idea but nevertheless, she is sent away in September that year. A few weeks later the Carpenters hear news that Cassie has run away from school and is nowhere to be found. She is discovered the following day, stealing food from Michelle Fowler (Susan Tully) and Lofty Holloway's (Tom Watt) kitchen in Albert Square, and returns to the school.

Cassie appears infrequently after this, and plays a Herald Angel in the Walford Nativity play on Christmas Eve 1986 and the following day when she, Kelvin and his friends play charades. This is her last appearance, but after her parents attempt at a reconciliation fails, Hannah leaves Walford and Cassie goes to live with her. Tony visits her occasionally, before leaving Walford, too, in 1987.

== Winston ==
Winston
- EastEnders character
- Portrayed by: Ulric Browne
- Duration: 1985–present
- First appearance: Episode 81; 26 November 1985
- Spin-off appearances: Pudding Lane (1999); Tracey: A Day in the Life (2024)
In-universe information
- Occupation: Market trader
- Nieces: Keisha

Winston is an extra character who is portrayed by Ulric Browne, with his first on-screen appearance being in episode 81, originally shown on 26 November 1985. However, he is not credited for his role until later on in the series. His first line is "Bloody pedestrians", said to Den Watts (Leslie Grantham), who gets in Winston's way when he is riding a bicycle. Winston owns the music stall in Walford's Bridge Street Market, and over the years he proves to be a great friend to his fellow long-standing stall-holder, Mark Fowler (Todd Carty). His highlights include shaving his tuft of hair off for charity and helping Ethel Skinner (Gretchen Franklin) arrive at her birthday party on the night she dies. He is angry when Ian Beale's (Adam Woodyatt) car crashes into his stall in October 2006.

Winston is always willing to help when other market traders are called away, for example, to appear in a key development of a current plot, for example when Stacey Slater (Lacey Turner) needs someone to guard her clothing stall while she and Max Branning (Jake Wood) slip into an unguarded bedroom to continue the next episode in their illicit affair. Winston generally appears at events held by other Walford residents, such as weddings, funerals and parties or briefly in the background of a scene. He attends the funerals of Pauline Fowler (Wendy Richard), Pat Evans (Pam St Clement) and Archie Mitchell (Larry Lamb), stag parties for Garry Hobbs (Ricky Groves), Lucas Johnson (Don Gilet) and Ricky Butcher (Sid Owen), Jean Slater's (Gillian Wright) birthday party and Ricky and Bianca Jackson's (Patsy Palmer) wedding. Sometimes characters steal DVDs or CDs from his stall, including Jay Brown (Jamie Borthwick).

In April 2008, Winston's niece Keisha (Suzie McGrath) arrives in Walford, and leaves a month later with Gus Smith (Mohammed George). Winston wins a Children in Need raffle in The Queen Victoria in November 2008, and in July 2009, Stacey Slater offers him a flower but he refuses. He also appears with Shirley Carter (Linda Henry) getting drunk in Ian's chip shop in June 2009 and is seen drunk again in August 2009. He is seen with Tracey (Jane Slaughter) in August 2009 talking about Max and Tanya Branning (Jo Joyner), and in November 2009 Ian invites him for drinks at The Queen Vic but he refuses.

On 15 June 2010, Winston has a speaking role as he is seen engaging in a minor conversation with Max. On 2 November 2010, he has another minor speaking role asking for 3 drinks at the newly reopened Queen Vic. In April 2011, during the screening of the wedding of Prince William and Catherine Middleton in The Queen Vic, Winston accidentally rips the cord from the television electrical plug, much to the dismay of the patrons. In January 2012, Winston is distracted by Kim Fox (Tameka Empson) in a bright outfit and accidentally knocks over a ladder, which nearly hits her. In May 2012, Lauren Branning (Jacqueline Jossa) buys a CD from Winston for her mother Tanya. However, Lauren's grandmother Cora Cross (Ann Mitchell) misinterprets the exchange and believes that Lauren is buying alcohol from Winston. In July 2012, Winston is chosen as the defender in The Queen Vic's football team. In August 2013, he locks market inspector Tamwar Masood (Himesh Patel) in a portable toilet as a joke, but Bianca and Kat Moon (Jessie Wallace) are blamed. He has a speaking role in April 2014 when he asks Alfie Moon (Shane Richie) for a black armband, as a mark of respect for the recently deceased Lucy Beale (Hetti Bywater) (see Who Killed Lucy Beale?) and another in June 2023 when he talks to Whitney Dean (Shona McGarty) about the new Vic owner and former boxer George Knight (Colin Salmon). On 6 March 2024, Winston celebrates his 60th birthday.

In 2020, Sara Wallis and Ian Hyland from The Daily Mirror placed Winston 97th on their ranked list of the best EastEnders characters of all time, calling him a "faithful extra" and referring to him as a legend due him once to yelling "Bloody pedestrians" at Den.

== Other characters ==
Character	Original episode date(s)	Actor	Circumstances
Michael	19 February 1985– 23 September 2016	Michael Leader	Michael is the milkman in Albert Square, whose first line is episode 122 (17 April 1986) when Ethel Skinner (Gretchen Franklin) gives him a palm reading. His first major line is 15 years later, when he brings a drunk Kat Slater (Jessie Wallace) home on his milk float, delivering her to her father, Charlie Slater (Derek Martin). In 2016, he is seen welcoming Peggy Mitchell (Barbara Windsor) back to Walford after giving her a ride around the square on his milk float. Before Peggy's funeral, Michael salutes The Queen Victoria public house sign to honour Peggy. Leader died on 22 August 2016.
Martha	19 February 1985– November 2006	Martha Ross	A woman who works on Bridge Street Market.
Mr Chumley	21 February	Brian Hoskin	The brewery area manager who visits Den Watts (Leslie Grantham) and Angie Watts (Anita Dobson) to discuss proposed alterations to the pub. When Ethel Skinner (Gretchen Franklin) fails to tell Den to leave whiskey he bought from elsewhere to sell in the car, Den lies to Mr Chumley they are having a private party. Den invites Mr Chumley and on the night of the party, Den learns that Mr Chumley never intended to come.
DI Marsh	21 February	Harry Miller	A police officer who visits Dr. Harold Legg (Leonard Fenton) to ask him questions about Reg Cox (Johnnie Clayton) as he is in charge of the murder case. Dr. Legg is shocked that Reg's death is being treated as a murder.
Fat Harry	28 February	Uncredited	The landlord of The Duke of York pub, who Den Watts (Leslie Grantham) invites to a private party at The Queen Victoria public house.
Jean Hancock	14 March	Isabelle Lucas	A health visitor, assigned to the single mother Mary Smith (Linda Davidson). She visits Mary to check on her and her daughter Annie Smith (Zara Posener), but Mary refuses to open the door until her neighbour Ali Osman (Nejdet Salih) convinces her. Mary tells Jean she has had nightmares about blood because she has discovered that Reg Cox (Johnnie Clayton) was murdered in her flat a month earlier and thinks there is blood in the flat that she cannot see. Jean tries to convince Mary to go to a clinic and mother-and-baby club. Jean then talks to Dr. Harold Legg (Leonard Fenton) about Mary, telling him that she needs to come to terms with what happened in the flat instead of moving out.
Alice	23 April–18 June (6 episodes)	Uncredited	A woman who lives on Albert Square and appears in various places such as The Queen Victoria public house, Albert Square gardens, the launderette and the café. She is always seen wearing a green hat with flowers on it.
WPC Alison Howard	30 April 1985– 18 April 1989	Elaine Donnelly	A local police officer for Walford, who first appears in April 1985 to take down details from the Fowler family about Mark Fowler (David Scarboro) running away from home. She says that the police do not have the resources to look for him and that he will likely return. She appears in June 1985 following the cot death of Hassan Osman (Michael Evangelou). In January 1986, she appears when Angie Watts (Anita Dobson) gives a statement about a car accident, and in May, she appears when Sharon Watts (Letitia Dean) runs away from home. In July, she visits Sue Osman (Sandy Ratcliff) when she suspects her husband, Ali Osman (Nejdet Salih), may know something about the theft of Dr. Harold Legg's (Leonard Fenton) car. W.P.C. Howard reappears over two years later following Donna Ludlow's (Matilda Ziegler) death following a drug overdose and talks to Dr. Legg about Donna's death and the fact that drug related deaths such as Donna's are becoming more common.
Gary aka "Spotty" aka "Chas" aka "Carlo"	9 May	Peter Laxton	Gary (nicknamed Spotty, credited as "Chas") is a friend of Kelvin Carpenter's (Paul J. Medford) who pretends to be an Italian waiter called Chas, also known as Carlo, someone who Michelle Fowler (Susan Tully) met on holiday in Clacton. He pretends to be Chas because of a prank call Ian Beale (Adam Woodyatt) made to Sharon Watts (Letitia Dean), pretending to be Chas, saying he would be visiting on Saturday, because he thinks Chas does not really exist. Michelle is humiliated, so Ian suggests finding someone to pose as Chas, so that Sharon will be none the wiser. He shows up at Ian's flat at Walford Towers, to watch Footloose on video, which Ian has bought from a friend. Gary does not know who Michelle is, and Michelle dislikes him as he has acne. Sharon seems to guess that he is a fake and finds the whole situation extremely amusing. As the group sits down to watch their video, they are startled to discover that Ian's friend has mistakenly given him a pornographic movie. Gary later lends a moped to Kelvin and Michelle.
Eric	21 May	Uncredited	A local paper boy who inadvertently causes Naima Jeffery (Shreela Ghosh) and Saeed Jeffery (Andrew Johnson) to crash Saeed's van into Ali Osman's (Nejdet Salih) taxicab during a driving lesson when he entices Roly with food so that Roly runs across the road into the path of the van.
Mustapha	13 June 1985– 5 August 1986 (3 episodes)	Vic Tablian	Mustapha is an associate of Ali Osman (Nejdet Salih) and his brother Mehmet Osman (Haluk Bilginer), who they invite for an after-hours poker game at the café, which runs well into dawn. Ali bets his business and car against him and wins. Mustapha is furious and accuses Ali of hustling him and reaches for a knife but is restrained by Mehmet and Den Watts (Leslie Grantham) then removed from the café. The following summer, Mustapha attends an after-hours poker game at The Queen Victoria public house along with Ali, Mehmet, Den and Arthur Fowler (Bill Treacher).
Ayse Osman	20 June	Mine Keylan	The Turkish Cypriot sister of Ali Osman (Nejdet Salih), who comes to care for his wife Sue Osman (Sandy Ratcliff) after their baby, Hassan Osman (Michael Evangelou), dies from cot death. She only speaks Turkish.
Lil	30 July 1985 – 12 July 1994	Jeannie Taylor	A woman who works on the market on the clothes stall.
Maude	1 August 1985 – 26 October 2004	Doreen Taylor	A woman who works on the market on the book stall. She is also often seen in The Queen Victoria public house. In September 1986, she enters a glamorous granny competition in the pub.
Dave	22 August	Uncredited	A delivery man who brings boxes to The Queen Victoria pub.
Stuart	29 August–17 September (2 episodes)	Kieran Parkes	A young patient who nurse Andy O'Brien (Ross Davidson) cares for. Andy grows very attached to the boy and brings him to Walford on several home visits. Andy's girlfriend, Debbie Wilkins (Shirley Cheriton), is initially against this, but Stuart soon charms her by telling her that she has pretty hair. Stuart's health worsens and as the hospital has insufficient funds, they cannot afford the correct equipment to save him. Stuart dies on 26 September 1985. Andy is extremely upset and scolds himself for getting emotionally attached to a patient. He breaks down and cries in the café one afternoon, blaming Stuart's death on the government, who, in Andy's opinion, believe that the purchasing of weapons is more important than the health care needs of children.
Alan Grout	29 August	Jon Glentoran	A man who works for the housing department of Walford Council. He visits 45 Albert Square after an application from Pauline Fowler (Wendy Richard) and Arthur Fowler (Bill Treacher) to have their home assessed, to see if they can be rehoused following the birth of a baby. They want to keep the meeting with Alan secret from Pauline's mother, Lou Beale (Anna Wing), but she is there when Alan arrives, and she is furious about the potential rehousing, tears up the Fowlers' application form and orders Alan out of her house. Pauline and Arthur arrive and Alan says they can make another appointment before leaving.
Mr Papadopolous	17 September 1985, 6 November 1986	Uncredited	The owner of the launderette. Dr. Harold Legg (Leonard Fenton) talks to him about the rubbish outside the launderette. He also appears in 1986 to let Ian Beale (Adam Woodyatt), Sharon Watts (Letitia Dean), Kelvin Carpenter (Paul Medford) and Sue Osman (Sandy Ratcliff) into the building when the business is late to open. He is the father of another Mr. Papadopolous (Lee Warner), who appears in 1992 as the new owner, following his death.
Danny Owen	7 November	Danny Owen	Danny Owen (credited as Singer) is a singer who sings at Angie Watts' (Anita Dobson) ladies' night before the eventual appearance of Fabulous Frankie. The drag artist compere (played by Lori Lee) names the singer as Danny Owen.
Fabulous Frankie	7 November	Frank Jakeman	Fabulous Frankie is a stripper, hired for the ladies night at The Queen Victoria public house. During his act, Frankie grabs an outraged fleeing Dot Cotton (June Brown), much to her shock and the amusement of the regulars.
Adam Steadman	21 November	Uncredited	Ian Beale's (Adam Woodyatt) opponent in a boxing match. He represents West Walford Boys Club. Ian wins the match by a KO in the first round, and after Adam loses the fight he attacks Ian again off-screen and is floored for a second time. Ian is upset when everyone credits his coach, Simon Wicks (Nick Berry), for the win. He gives up boxing directly after.
Ruth Lyons	28 November 1985– 6 February 1986	Judy Liebert	A social worker, who offers Pauline Fowler (Wendy Richard) advice on caring for her ailing mother, Lou Beale (Anna Wing). She did so at the request of her good friend, Dr. Harold Legg (Leonard Fenton). Upon seeing Ruth and Dr. Legg drinking together or playing darts in The Queen Victoria public house a few times, some locals are led to imagine that a romantic link exists between them. When Pauline mentions this to Dr. Legg, he finds the idea amusing and explains that Ruth is already 'married' – to the woman she lives with.
George	17 December 1985	Uncredited	A customer of Pete Beale's (Peter Dean) on the fruit and veg stall.
Raymond	19 December 1985	Mark White	A representative from the company responsible for collecting money from the jukebox at The Queen Victoria public house. Raymond has previously sold Den Watts (Leslie Grantham) a key to the jukebox so Den can take half the money as long as he leaves enough so the jukebox company do not realise. However, when Raymond empties the jukebox, he finds only one coin in it and accuses Den of trying to get him the sack and Raymond also believes that Den is dishonest and a thief. After Raymond leaves, Den accuses his employees of the theft.
Ingrid	31 December 1985– 2 January 1986	Sally Faulkner	Ingrid is an older woman who Mark Fowler (David Scarboro) has been living with in Southend-on-Sea for four months. They live with Ingrid's two children, John and Melanie, who call Mark "daddy". Mark later introduces Ingrid, John and Melanie to his sister, Michelle Fowler (Susan Tully) after she locates him. All three characters are not named in their first appearance and the Short children are not credited for their appearances.
John	31 December 1985– 2 January 1986	Anthony Short	Ingrid is an older woman who Mark Fowler (David Scarboro) has been living with in Southend-on-Sea for four months. They live with Ingrid's two children, John and Melanie, who call Mark "daddy". Mark later introduces Ingrid, John and Melanie to his sister, Michelle Fowler (Susan Tully) after she locates him. All three characters are not named in their first appearance and the Short children are not credited for their appearances.
Melanie	31 December 1985– 2 January 1986	Vanessa Short	Ingrid is an older woman who Mark Fowler (David Scarboro) has been living with in Southend-on-Sea for four months. They live with Ingrid's two children, John and Melanie, who call Mark "daddy". Mark later introduces Ingrid, John and Melanie to his sister, Michelle Fowler (Susan Tully) after she locates him. All three characters are not named in their first appearance and the Short children are not credited for their appearances.
