= Kelvin Carpenter =

Fictional character from the BBC soap opera EastEnders

- EastEnders character
- Portrayed by: Paul J. Medford
- Duration: 1985–1987
- First appearance: Episode 7; 12 March 1985
- Last appearance: Episode 267; 3 September 1987
- Created by: Tony Holland and Julia Smith
In-universe information
- Occupation: Student
- Father: Tony Carpenter
- Mother: Hannah Carpenter
- Sisters: Cassie Carpenter

Kelvin Carpenter is a fictional character from the BBC soap opera EastEnders, played by Paul J. Medford from 12 March 1985 to 3 September 1987.

Kelvin is a bright spark and full of initiative. He opens several businesses in Albert Square and even forms a band. He is a bit of a heartbreaker in the early years, but eventually he has his heart broken in return, when his middle-aged girlfriend jilts him. Always a bit too intelligent for Walford, Kelvin eventually leaves for university.

== Creation and development ==
Kelvin Carpenter was one of the original twenty-three characters invented by the creators of EastEnders, Tony Holland and Julia Smith. Kelvin was originally intended to be named Kevin, and his father Tony Carpenter was originally named Alan. They were the first black characters to appear in the soap. Black and Asian characters were two ethnic minorities that had previously been under-represented in British soap before EastEnders aired. Holland and Smith knew that for the soap to succeed there needed to be a varied group of characters, so that several different sections of the audience had someone to identify with. Additionally, if the programme was to be realistic, it had to reflect the cross-section of society that actually existed in the real location. For these reasons, different sexes, ages, classes, religions and races were all included in the original character line-up. Both Holland and Smith had been at the forefront of the move towards 'integrated casting' in television and had encountered an array of ethnic diversities in the process. Even though the ethnic minority groups were deemed the hardest to research, Holland and Smith called upon their contacts to relay information about their origins and lifestyles and were then able to portray Walford's most recent immigrants more realistically.

Kelvin's original character outline as written by Smith and Holland appeared in an abridged form in their book, EastEnders: The Inside Story (In this passage, Kelvin will be referred to as Kevin and his father as Alan).

"Kevin wants to stay with his dad...How would Alan react to the discovery that Kevin's visiting his mother? How would Kevin react to his father trying to smuggle a woman for the night? And, how would dad react to son doing the same thing? What happens when they're competing for the same woman? As he wants to leave his mark - physically - on the walls of the building, so he wants to leave his mark on his son. Will Kevin take it, or leave it?" (page 58).

The actor Paul Medford had been recommended for the role by four separate agencies. He was London born, and they deemed him good-looking, fashionable and street-credible, making him ideal for their vision of Kelvin. After a subsequent and successful reading with the actor Oscar James (who played his father), Medford was cast in the role. James was physically much bigger than Medford, and Holland and Smith thought it was a good idea for Tony and Kelvin to be not only different in ages, but different physical types as well. Storywise it was felt it would be possible to build on this and also give them different attitudes and beliefs.

Kelvin became one of the most popular young characters in the show's early years. Several of his early storylines were actually intended for the character Mark Fowler, but following the impromptu departure of actor David Scarboro (the original Mark, who left after refusing to play a scene where the character delivered racist abuse to Kelvin), his storylines were subsequently given to Kelvin, Michelle Fowler and Ian Beale. The character of Kelvin remained in the show for over two years, and was eventually written out when Paul Medford decided to follow his ambition of becoming a singer/dancer on stage in 1987.

In his final scene, Kelvin left the square without attending his leaving party. The real reason for this is because 'lot recordings' (scenes recorded on site in Albert Square) for each week's episodes normally occur two weeks before the studio recordings for the same episodes. When the leaving party was recorded in the studio, Paul Medford was already out of contract and had left the show.

== Storylines ==
Kelvin Carpenter as he appeared in 1985

Kelvin lives on the Square with his Trinidadian father, Tony Carpenter (Oscar James). Kelvin's parents had separated and he chose to live with his father, whilst his sister Cassie Carpenter (Delanie Forbes) lived with his mother, Hannah Carpenter (Sally Sagoe). His family are reunited later that year when Hannah arrives, telling her father and brother, that her mother's current boyfriend Neville Agard (Gordon Case) has been beating them both. Hannah had always looked down on Tony's way of life and although they try to make their marriage work, they bicker regularly so Kelvin is often forced to take on the role of mediator.

Kelvin spends most of his spare time with the other youngsters of Albert Square: Ian Beale (Adam Woodyatt), Sharon Watts (Letitia Dean) and Michelle Fowler (Susan Tully). Sharon and Michelle are both attracted to Kelvin and they spent most of 1985 fighting for his affections. Kelvin has flings with both of them, leading to more fighting but in the end Kelvin jilts them both in order to concentrate on his exams. Kelvin and Ian then compete for the attentions of Mary Smith (Linda Davidson), who briefly drops her punk image. However, she is interested in neither. Later that year, Kelvin starts a knitting business with Ian and Lofty Holloway (Tom Watt), which is named 'Loftelian' (a portmanteau of the three owners' names). Despite a huge effort from all involved, the business is doomed from the start and doesn't last long.

During the latter part of 1986, Kelvin attends college and makes some new friends, including Harry Reynolds (Gareth Potter) and Tessa Parker (Josephine Melville). He dates Tessa briefly and his new friends' radical political beliefs and influence seems to have an effect on the way Kelvin views life too. He begins moving away from his old friends and none of them like the way he has changed but following an argument with Michelle, he sees the error of his ways. Soon after, Kelvin is instrumental in starting a band with the other Walford youths, including Ian, Sharon, Simon Wicks (Nick Berry), Harry Reynolds and Eddie Hunter (Simon Henderson). Tessa wants to join too but is refused membership on the grounds that she is an awful musician - Kelvin's relationship with her ends soon after. The group name themselves The Banned and write a song entitled "Something Outta Nothing", but after a disastrous few gigs, they realise they are terrible and split up.

In 1987, Kelvin faces more family problems when his parents' ill-fated reunion finally results in divorce. In order to escape the constant rows at home, Kelvin spends a lot of time with Carmel Roberts (Judith Jacob) and eventually the two start dating, much to his parents' dismay. Carmel is a health visitor who is considerably older than Kelvin (who has just turned 17) but he moves in with Carmel but their age difference soon begins to take its toll. She soon gets tired of Kelvin's immature behaviour and asks him to move out after publicly dumps him in The Vic. Kelvin then makes a play for Ian's girlfriend, Tina Hopkins (Eleanor Rhodes), but she shuns his advances. With nothing left in Walford to hold him back, Kelvin decides to leave for Norwich university in September 1987, to take a course in computer studies. His friends throw a leaving party for him but Kelvin shuns it 'as he hates goodbyes'. He departs Walford without a farewell from anyone.

In 2010, Ian finds Kelvin on a social networking website and Kelvin tells Ian that he is now a songwriter with a model girlfriend, living in Shoreditch. However, after failing to meet up with Ian, Kelvin admits that this is a lie. In 2017, Michelle (now played by Jenna Russell) mentions Kelvin to her brother Martin Fowler (James Bye), so he contacts him on social media on Michelle's behalf and later arranges a reunion. Michelle waits to meet him, but he does not turn up.

== Reception ==
Kelvin Carpenter has been described by author Hilary Kingsley as one of the most popular young characters in the show's early years. However, the way that EastEnders treated their black characters during the 1980s has been criticized by Robert Clyde Allen, author of the book To be Continued--: Soap Operas Around the World. He has commented that "none of the black families [in EastEnders] rivaled the Fowler/Beale [family's] position at the heart of the programme's structure, and black characters were pushed to the margins of the storylines." The author goes on to say that although the character of Kelvin Carpenter mixed with characters such as Ian, Sharon and Michelle, "his personal life got little attention and he disappeared from the programme while the other young characters [were] able to grow up in it."

Before he was written out of the serial in May 1987, actor Oscar James, who played Kelvin's father Tony, controversially criticised EastEnders and the BBC for not promoting their black characters. He commented, "The powers that be do not think I am interesting enough. Is it because I am a member of an ethnic minority? How often do you see [Kelvin's actor] Paul J. Medford being publicised?...It's as though the BBC are playing us down. I can't believe the white majority of the public are against blacks being stars. They don't give a damn."

Conversely, in The Black and White Media Show Book, edited by John Twitchin of BBC TV's Continuing Education Department (published in 1988), the author praises EastEnders for portraying black people on mainstream television, and for giving them "respectable, fleshed-out parts which allow them to be the most difficult of things — 'normal people'." In a school-based study (1986) examining black representation on television from 1985 to 1986, a storyline featuring Kelvin Carpenter was used to assess how the character was perceived. The aim was to measure whether Kelvin was being portrayed as "normal" as opposed to a "trouble-maker", a category black people on television were typically labelled as prior to the 1980s. For the study, a storyline was used in which Kelvin began behaving like a "newly-converted revolutionary". Both groups, white students and black/Asian students, felt that Kelvin was not a trouble-maker, or menace, but was being portrayed as an eccentric, and both groups agreed that the Carpenter family were seen as having troubles as opposed to causing trouble, akin to the white families in the serial. However, the black/Asian group felt that the Carpenter family's problems were "less subtlety explored than those of their white counterparts, giving rise to possible racist misinterpretations."
