= Rod Norman =

Fictional character from EastEnders

- EastEnders character
- Portrayed by: Christopher McHallem
- Duration: 1987–1990
- First appearance: 28 July 1987
- Last appearance: 27 February 1990
- Introduced by: Julia Smith
In-universe information
- Occupation: Roadie; Market trader Cleaner

Rod Norman is a fictional character from the BBC soap opera EastEnders, played by Christopher McHallem from 28 July 1987, to 27 February 1990. Rod is depicted as a roadie and a modern-day vagabond, regularly squatting and never staying anywhere for long periods. However, he returned to Albert Square in several episodes. Rod is attracted to rebellious women and tries to help out several 'women in need' throughout the series.

== Development ==
McHallem was cast after auditioning for a bit part as a "dodgy drugs runner". The serial's co-creator and producer Julia Smith noticed his "punky clothes" and ear studs and thought he was the right actor to play Rod, a roadie who was going to help punk Mary Smith (Linda Davidson) get on "the straight and narrow." He secured the role a year after leaving acting college, and he was initially contracted for six months. McHallem admitted that it was "the BIG break" into acting and said it was "quite daunting" joining the cast, having previously watched the omnibus showing on Sunday afternoons. Pauline McLeod of the Daily Mirror thought he was well suited to the role, as he had been a roadie for three years. McHallam said it was "a good part", calling Rod "streetwise, but still quite a gullible, caring character who retained a faith in human nature." Three months after his first appearance, McHallem's mother told him that he was mumbling his lines, which he agreed with. He told Graham Young of the Birmingham Mail that appearing on television had "taken some adjustment" and he realised that he had been almost inaudible for the first three months.

McHallem described Rod as being "contradictory in a way many people are in real life." He said he had "a great integrity and a basic honesty but at the same time he is not naïve. Rod knows the way of the world but he still thinks there is hope..." McHallem told McLeod that he had always liked the character of Mary, describing her as "guileless" and someone he wanted to slap, but not in a malicious way. He explained that he had been in a similar situation to his character, but felt that he was not as capable as Rod is, saying "He's strong and I don't think I'm a good person to lean on." McHallem was unsure in which direction Rod and Mary's relationship was going to go, as it was early days and they did not trust one another yet. He also pointed out that Rod was sleeping on her floor and not in her bed. However, McLeod reckoned that they were going to become "a steady couple" for some time. Rod and Mary often disappeared for a number of episodes when Rod was said to be off touring with a band. McHallem felt that this gave "credence" to the character and showed that people who live unorthodox lives were still caring people. He believed Rod was "a good person, who gave the impression he has been around and seen the world, even if it was from the back of a Transit van." Davidson was "a steadying influence" on McHallem and she spent some of her spare time helping him to develop their character's relationship.

Following Mary's departure, Rod takes "pity" on drug addict Donna Ludlow (Matilda Ziegler). He saves her by chance from being sexually assaulted, and attempts to "straighten her out". He grows "quite fond" of Donna and tries to help her get clean from drugs, but his efforts prove to be unsuccessful. EastEnders: 20 Years in Albert Square author Rupert Smith quipped that he was "less successful with Donna than he had been with Mary." After a three month on-screen absence, Rod returns to Albert Square and learns Donna has died after overdosing. A Shields Daily Gazette critic used this storyline as an example of how the soap stretches tension and credibility to the limit, as it took "a whole half hour" to tell Rod about Donna's death.

McHallam decided to leave EastEnders after two and a half years in order to find new and different roles. He felt Rod had gone "full-circle", explaining "He had embarked on another fraught relationship and his character seemed to have stopped developing so I decided to go." He admitted that he would have liked the producers to have done some "grovelling", but they let him go. He filmed his final scenes in January 1990. On-screen, Rod goes to India and McHallem was happy that he finally got there, as he knew people in real life who often said they were going to go someplace and years later, they were still saying that. He was pleased Rod did not turn out like them. McHallam also said that he would recommend going into a soap to any actor, although it was hard work.

McHallem told Jenny Byrne from Chelsea News and General Advertiser that he lived a nomadic lifestyle while appearing in EastEnders. He tried to avoid being recognised outside of work by socialising in the West End. McHallem claimed that his acting work on the show was mostly "low-key" because most of the cast were playing characters similar to themselves. He added that "the turnover is fast you couldn't possibly do a Robert DeNiro however much we'd all like to." He was also embarrassed of the attention from the public that the role brought him, and recalled that a fan once snatched the earring he always wore from his ear.

== Storylines ==
Rod arrives in Albert Square as an acquaintance of fellow punk, Mary Smith (Linda Davidson). Rod is portrayed as a greasy loafer with a heart of gold. Mary was arrested for solicitation, lost her baby, Annie, to social services due to neglect, engaged in prostitution, and uses recreational drugs. Seeing how desperate Mary has become, Rod makes it his mission to help her out of the mess she has found herself in. He moves in with her, gets her a job as a cleaner at The Dagmar, and weans her off drugs and prostitution. He also helps in getting Annie back from Mary's parents in Stockport, who are reluctant to give her up. However, at the end of the year, Mary's father Chris (Allan O'Keefe) arrives in Walford with Annie.

When Rod accidentally forgets to pick Annie up from the playground, Mary is furious and evicts him. Rod disappears and goes on a road trip. After returning, he refuses to move back in with her and starts squatting in an abandoned flat on the Square. Mary spirals, and Rod's attempts to help fail. He leaves her alone and Mary eventually flees Walford.

Rod remains in Walford, as does Mary's father, who employs Rod as his bookkeeper and organiser of his haulage company. Later Rod takes over Barry Clark's (Gary Hailes) market stall. Rod acts against his principles when he is threatened by Brad Williams (Jonathan Stratt), a dodgy member of The Firm, and stitches up local publican Den Watts (Leslie Grantham). The Firm wants Den to take responsibility for the torching of The Dagmar, so they coerce Rod into providing false testimony to the police, which implicates Den. Den flees Walford and manages to escape arrest. When The Firm decides they want Den dead, Rod later gets his whereabouts from Den's best friend Pete Beale (Peter Dean), which leads to Den's arrest and time spent in prison.

Rod starts to become close to Donna Ludlow (Matilda Ziegler), who has become homeless, and she comes to live with him in his squat. Donna is widely disliked, and Rod decides to help her become stable. Donna becomes addicted to heroin. Rod tries to get Donna off the drug, in retaliation she plants heroin on him to frame him for drug dealing. Rod continues to help Donna. He rescues her from a vicious gang rape and contacts her parents. Donna later overdoses on heroin and dies.

Rod lodges with Dot Cotton (June Brown) and becomes involved with Hazel (Virginia Fiol), the girlfriend of Dot's son, Nick Cotton (John Altman). Hazel had arrived in Albert Square under the pretence that her baby was Nick's. This later turns out to be a ploy to extort money from Dot. Dot is devastated to learn she has been conned, but comes to forgive Hazel and allows her to live with her. When Nick discovers Hazel's deception, he beats her close to death, and she spends time in the hospital. While there, Rod visits her regularly. They briefly become a couple. Rod leaves her, and Walford, to follow a hippy trail in India.

== Reception ==
Johnathon Hughes from Radio Times called Rod a "kind-hearted rock'n'roll roadie" and believed that he was the closest that Mary got to a "functional adult relationship". In his book EastEnders: 20 Years in Albert Square, Rupert Smith described "Rod the Roadie" as being "a one-man social services for the lost girls of Walford in the early days of EastEnders." Margaret Forward of the Daily Express criticised his style, but praised him for his actions, saying "Despite wearing an annoying beret, Rod turned out to be a saint in scruffy clothing who stopped Mary going down the path of prostitution." Roy Bailey from Cheshunt and Waltham Mercury believed that Rod was attired in "weird clothes". The Birmingham Mail's Graham Young included Rod in his EastEnders rogues gallery. He called the character a layabout and a "sometime drug addict with a heart of gold – or was that guilt?" He also stated that Rod "was blown around Albert Square like living litter", before remarking that he had "unkempt hair and scruffy clothes". Jo Davison from the Hull Daily Mail branded Rod a "scrawny misfit" and stated that the show's fans "looked beyond the matted locks and the earring and, like the characters, took him into their hearts."
