= Carmel Jackson =

Fictional character from the BBC soap opera EastEnders

- EastEnders character
- Portrayed by: Judith Jacob
- Duration: 1986–1989
- First appearance: Episode 136; 5 June 1986
- Last appearance: Episode 475; 24 August 1989
- Created by: Tony Holland
- Introduced by: Julia Smith
In-universe information
- Occupation: Health visitor
- Mother: Mrs Roberts
- Brothers: Darren Roberts
- Sisters: Maxine Roberts
- Husband: Matthew Jackson (1989–90)
- Uncles: Josh
- Aunts: Nancy
- Nephews: Junior Roberts
- Nieces: Aisha Roberts

Carmel Jackson (also Roberts) is a fictional character from the BBC soap opera EastEnders, played by Judith Jacob from 5 June 1986 to 24 August 1989. Carmel, a health visitor, was initially introduced in a recurring, minor role in 1986, when she is credited as "health visitor". Producers saw potential in the character, and script writers were asked to develop more prominent storylines, and Carmel became a regular character. She is portrayed as a well-meaning, caring individual who is forever getting everyone's problems dumped on her. She is featured in storylines about domestic violence and various family and career upsets. Jacob remained in the role until 1989, when she opted to leave. Off-screen, the character was the subject of criticism regarding the portrayal of her profession from the Health Visitors Association.

== Character creation ==
In July 1984, before EastEnders went to air, the show's creators, Tony Holland and Julia Smith, attended an opening evening at the Anna Scher Theatre School in North London, in order to find actors for roles in their upcoming serial. According to Holland and Smith, Anna Scher's school was unlike many other drama schools, where students were "ironed out", all looking and sounding the same. At Anna Scher's school, students' natural personalities and accents were encouraged, "her students aren't taught how to act, they're helped to dig inside themselves and be." In Holland and Smith's own words, this was "just the sort of non-acting that [EastEnders] was looking for".

Often, former students who were already working in the acting profession attended Scher's classes, and on the night Holland and Smith attended, actress Judith Jacob performed. Holland and Smith described Jacob as "an old friend", as they had previously worked with her on their medical drama Angels, where Jacob had played nurse Beverley Slater between 1979 and 1981. Following the end of the class, Holland and Smith concluded that Judith Jacob "had been as good as ever", but that "there wasn't really a part for her" in the original character line-up.

However, in 1986, a year after the soap had first aired, Jacob was recruited by Julia Smith and offered a part in the serial, the minor role of Carmel Roberts, a health visitor who tended to the character Michelle Fowler (Susan Tully) after the birth of her baby Vicki. In his book, EastEnders: The First 10 Years, author and EastEnders scriptwriter Colin Brake has used Carmel as an example of the way minor characters can develop in EastEnders: "Often a new character is introduced for a limited number of episodes, to serve a particular storyline or the story function. If the casting is good and the character 'works' on the screen, then the writers may be asked if there is potential in the character for further appearances." This occurred with the character of Carmel, and later in 1986 she was reintroduced as a regular character, moving to the soap's focal setting of Albert Square.

== Character development ==
As Walford's health visitor, Carmel's principal purpose was to act as an advisor to the troubled residents of Albert Square. In the EastEnders Handbook, author Hilary Kingsley describes Carmel as "saintly by nature", adding "if anyone deserved a medal for patience it was Carmel Roberts when she was working as Albert Square's health visitor".

In 1987, an extended family was introduced for Carmel, including her brother Darren (Gary McDonald), and his two children Junior (Aaron Carrington) and Aisha (Aisha Jacob). According to the EastEnders Handbook, parents of young child actors were sometimes upset unavoidably during filming of EastEnders. For instance, the parents of the baby who played Hassan Osman were affected when their baby was used in a storyline about cot death, as they had not been warned. This problem was avoided with the two-year-old girl who played Carmel's niece, Aisha Roberts, as she was the real-life daughter of actress Judith Jacob. The writers "obligingly" called the young character Aisha, to make it less confusing for the actors. The idea to use Jacob's real daughter had come from the serial's co-creator Julia Smith. Jacob was initially against the idea. In an interview she commented, "Children on the set can be so horrible", due to awkwardness inherent in disciplining someone else's child in the workplace. However, she has said that she found it hard to turn Julia Smith down, and realised that she would get to spend more time with her daughter if she also was working on the set of EastEnders. This caused a problem once on-screen, when Aisha referred to Carmel as "mummy", even though Aisha's character was not Carmel's daughter. Despite the inconsistency, the producers left the scene in.

Carmel's storylines included a brief relationship with a toyboy, Kelvin Carpenter (Paul Medford), and numerous family and career-based problems. In 1988, Carmel gained a new partner, a white man named Matthew Jackson, played by Steven Hartley. The characters were shown to marry in a register office in January 1989, beginning a domestic violence storyline. By March 1989, Matthew was beating Carmel. This was the first time that EastEnders had dealt with the issue of domestic violence. After several months of abuse, a "particularly violent" incident ended with Junior stabbing Matthew with a kitchen knife to protect his aunt. By July 1989, the marriage "was as good as dead". Jacob has commented, "It was a great part to play. People couldn’t understand how a professional woman can stay with someone who beats her. That shows the durability of the character."

Jacob opted to leave the serial in 1989, and she has since commented that "They didn’t want me to leave, and made me a couple of offers to stay", but leaving seemed like the right thing to do at the time. On-screen Carmel's marriage collapsed, and the following month her father died, so she left Walford to tend to her grieving mother. She last appeared in August 1989.

== Storylines ==
Carmel is first seen in Walford in June 1986 when she is assigned as Michelle Fowler's (Susan Tully) health visitor. West Indian by origin, British by education, Carmel is unmistakable with her long dreadlocks and colourful clothing. Carmel is kept extremely busy in Walford as she has all the difficult cases - Mary Smith (Linda Davidson), a prostitute, whose baby, Annie, has been removed; Sue Osman (Sandy Ratcliff), a mentally unstable mother who is obsessed with her baby, Ali's, welfare; Donna Ludlow (Matilda Ziegler), a self-destructing heroin addict, and jobless Arthur Fowler (Bill Treacher), among others.

In December 1986, Carmel starts dating Kelvin Carpenter (Paul J. Medford), much to his parents' dismay. Carmel later moves into the ground floor flat at number 3 Albert Square and she and Kelvin live together for a while. However, their age difference takes its toll on Carmel, who grows tired of Kelvin's immature behaviour. She eventually throws Kelvin out after publicly dumping him in The Queen Victoria public house.

Shortly after Carmel moves to the Square, her brother Darren (Gary McDonald) and his children, Junior (Aaron Carrington) and Aisha (Aisha Jacob), join her. Darren and Carmel are complete opposite of each other; Darren is inconsiderate and often dabbles on the wrong side of the law with dodgy scams, such as porn video laundering and instigating a counterfeit money ring. Carmel despairs over his thoughtless behaviour and criminal antics, but he ignores her and she regularly takes over caring for his two young children. Junior proves to be troublesome, and after Carmel discovers that he has been playing truant from school for some time, she reports Darren to the truancy officer as an irresponsible parent. This does not please Darren and he is even more annoyed when Carmel refuses flatly to put up with his behaviour any longer. Animosity between the two increases when Carmel starts dating Matthew Jackson (Steven Hartley) later that year; Darren is unhappy about his sister dating a white man. Carmel defends Matthew against her brother's racism, and after Darren cons Ian Beale (Adam Woodyatt), she throws him out. Darren then leaves alone, leaving his children so Carmel sends them to her parents as she only has a one bedroom flat.

In September 1988, Matthew moves into Carmel's flat and the two are soon engaged. Matthew is well liked in the community, even convincing Carmel's skeptical father that he is genuine and Carmel begins planning their wedding. She wants to invite Matthew's mother, Lynna, but he is opposed to this as Lynna abandoned him at 15 and has had no subsequent contact. Carmel and Matthew marry in January 1989, but the day is ruined when Matthew sees his mother there. Carmel contacted her regardless, thinking Matthew would be pleased, but he is furious. After shunning their reception party, Matthew threatens to leave Carmel and when she tries to stop him, he grabs her by the throat, holds her up against a wall and berates her for her interference. Carmel is petrified and upon seeing her fear, Matthew releases her and begins apologising profusely. Carmel is shaken up, but Matthew convinces her that his apology is sincere, so she drops the matter.

More problems arise for the newlyweds when Carmel's sister, Maxine (Ella Wilder), announces that their parents cannot cope with Junior and Aisha. She states that if Carmel does not take the children, they will be put into care. Matthew is unwilling but after Carmel's father has a stroke, Maxine brings the children to Carmel so they move in with her and Matthew. He resents them as Carmel's time is being diverted from him; finding Junior, in particular, difficult to cope with. They regularly clash, causing further animosity between Matthew and Carmel and Matthew becomes violent again, punching Carmel during an argument about Junior. She has some nasty bruises but once again a tearful Matthew convinces her to forgive him. Matthew's behaviour alternates between contrite and caring to hot-tempered and violent, for seemingly no reason. Nevertheless, Carmel loves him and stays with him as she believes she can help him combat and contain his rage but Junior soon realises why his aunt is constantly bruised and tries to stop the violence by telling people about the abuse but this only makes matters worse. Matthew becomes irrationally jealous of Carmel's friendship with Dr. David Samuels (Christopher Reich), and during a family meal, he turns violent again and attempting to protect Carmel, Junior stabs Matthew with a kitchen knife and he is rushed to hospital, where he tries to convince Carmel that he has changed. She allows him to come home and tries to get him professional help but Matthew refuses, appalled by the idea and begins smashing up the house and threatening Carmel with more violence. Finally realising that she cannot help Matthew, Carmel ends their relationship. She throws Matthew out and he leaves Walford in July 1989. The following month, Carmel's father dies, so she leaves Walford with Junior and Aisha to look after her mother. Her last appearance is in August 1989.

== Reception ==
Co-creator of EastEnders, Julia Smith, has been quoted as saying, "Our EastEnd setting was chosen for the diversity of its past — the strong culture it has and the multi-racial community that has developed." However, the way that EastEnders treated their black characters during the 1980s has been criticized. Stephen Bourne, author of Black in the British Frame: The Black Experience in British Film and Television has commented that "[EastEnders'] black characters have rarely been as interesting as their white counterparts, or been given storylines of any substance...Viewers were more likely to tune in to watch the antics of Dirty Den, his wife Angie and bad boy Nick Cotton, than [black characters like] the Carpenter family and Carmel." In Robert Clyde Allen's book, To be Continued--: Soap Operas Around the World, Christine Geraghty has added "none of the black families [in EastEnders] rivaled the Fowler/Beale [family's] position at the heart of the programme's structure, and black characters were pushed to the margins of the story-lines. Carmel and [her brother] Darren clearly had an extended family along the lines of the Fowler/Beale nexus but its other members were rarely seen."

Conversely, in The Black and White Media Show Book, edited by John Twitchin of BBC TV's Continuing Education Department (published in 1988), EastEnders is praised for portraying black people on mainstream television, and for giving them "respectable, fleshed-out parts which allow them to be the most difficult of things — 'normal people'." Additionally, actress Judith Jacob has said that she looks back on her three years in EastEnders only with "delight". She has also said that she disagrees with the criticism EastEnders gets for paying "token lip service to blacks and minorities, who are usually depicted stereotypically." In 2006, she commented to the Walford Gazette, "EastEnders was the only show to [regularly employ] black actors. [Rival soap] Coronation Street just recently started bringing in black characters. There has always been a good flow of people in EastEnders."

Further criticism has been aimed at Carmel's portrayal as a health visitor. In the late 1980s, a specialist nursing magazine called Nursing Times had a feature on the character, remarking that she "has come in for quite a bit of stick from HVA [Health Visitors Association] members who haven't felt that the character gives a good impression of their role". HVA members expressed disappointment that the character "has not developed in a way which promotes the role of health visitors more positively." Roma Iskander, who had discussed the role with EastEnders scriptwriters on behalf of the HVA, said that "Carmel isn't a positive image of a black woman or a health visitor." The magazine article suggested that Carmel's personal problems with family and clients served her right "for moving to Albert Square in the first place. Health visitors be warned — don't live on your work patch". However, in Dominic Strinati's book, Come on Down?: Popular Media Culture in Post-War Britain, Christine Geraghty has argued that "the credibility of Carmel's character in the soap depended on her being part of the life of the Square, regularly and unproblematically available as a source of advice and support in her professional capacity as well as the focus of interest in terms of her personal life." Geraghty has said that tension arose from conflict in the 1980s soaps "between a desire to be positive about a particular issue and a commitment to credibility in terms of character and setting. The HVA, it would appear, want Carmel to be a model health visitor, demonstrating a wide range of skills in a professional manner. But the credibility of Carmel's character in the soap depends on her being a character who is part of the life of the Square, a professional who makes mistakes and whose personal life is almost a source of interest. Quite clearly, the demands for a positive image for health visitors as a profession are less pressing than the necessity to be able to deploy Carmel as a soap opera character. Those making the programme are quite certain that this is the way it must be."
