= Mehmet Osman =

Fictional character from the BBC soap opera EastEnders

- EastEnders character
- Portrayed by: Haluk Bilginer
- Duration: 1985–1989
- First appearance: Episode 34; 13 June 1985
- Last appearance: Episode 431; 23 March 1989
- Created by: Tony Holland and Julia Smith
In-universe information
- Occupation: Café owner Minicab firm owner
- Father: Hassan Osman
- Brothers: Ali Osman
- Sisters: Ayse Osman
- Wife: Guizin Osman
- Sons: Rayif Osman; Murat Osman
- Daughters: Emine Osman
- Uncles: Ahmet Osman
- Nephews: Hassan Osman; Little Ali Osman

Mehmet Osman is a fictional character from the BBC soap opera EastEnders, played by Haluk Bilginer. Mehmet is portrayed as a charmer, rogue and a serial womaniser, and makes recurring appearances in EastEnders from 1985 to 1987, and then regularly until 1989.

== Character creation and development ==
=== Background ===
Mehmet Osman was conceptualised by the creators of EastEnders, Tony Holland and Julia Smith. Mehmet, the brother of original character Ali Osman (Nejdet Salih), was part of a well-intentioned attempt to represent the proportion of Turkish Cypriots who had immigrated to England and settled in the East End of London. Holland and Smith knew that for the soap to succeed there needed to be a varied group of characters, so that several different sections of the audience had someone to identify with. Additionally, if the programme was to be realistic, it had to reflect the cross-section of society that actually existed in the real location. For these reasons, different sexes, ages, classes, religions and races were all included in the original character line-up. Both Holland and Smith had been at the forefront of the move towards 'integrated casting' in television and had encountered an array of ethnic diversities in the process. Even though the ethnic minority groups were deemed the hardest to research, Holland and Smith called upon their social contacts to relay information about their own origins and lifestyles, which they say allowed them to portray Walford's most recent immigrants more realistically.

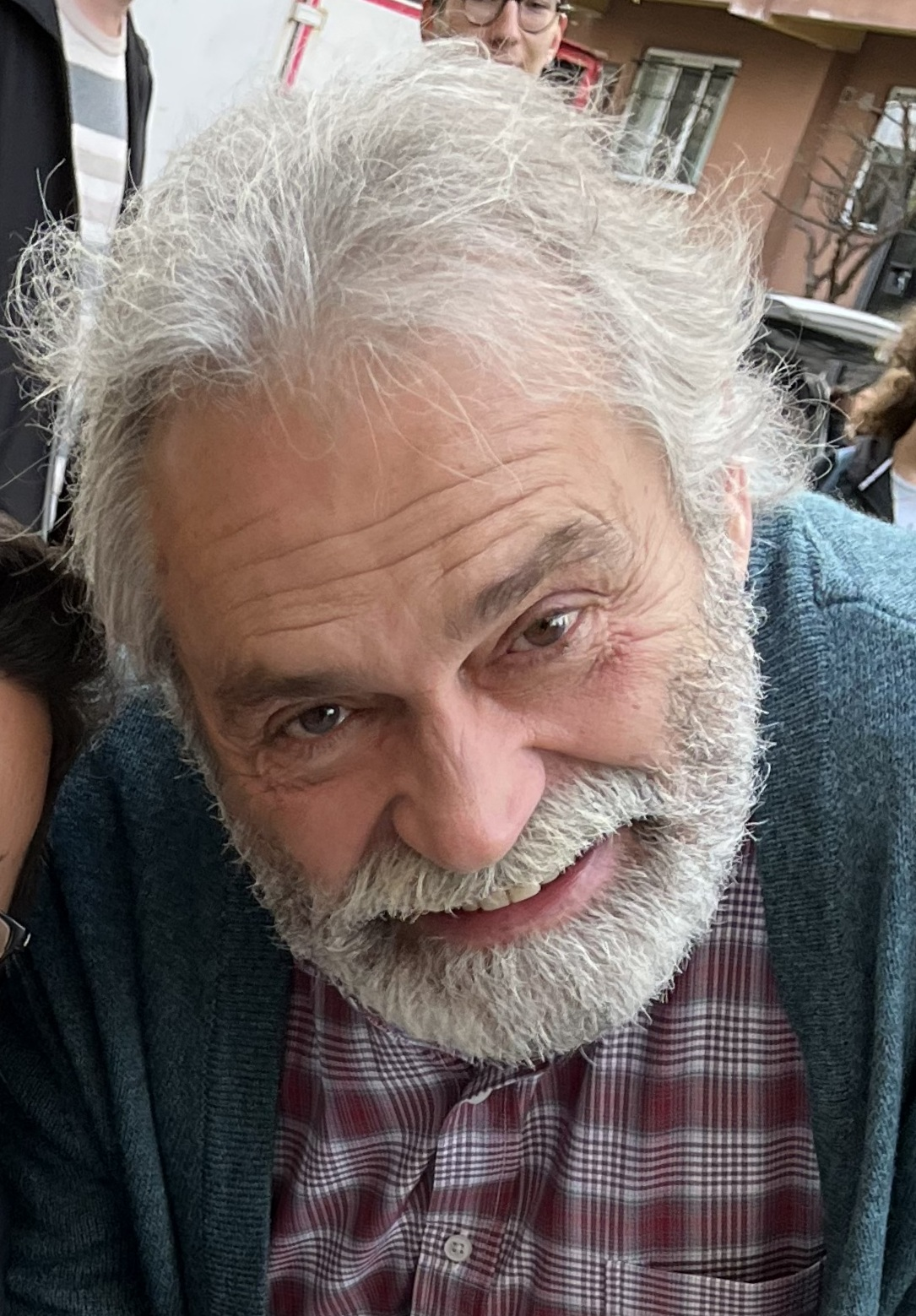
Haluk Bilginer (pictured) originally was considered to play Mehmet's brother, Ali, before he was cast.

=== Casting ===
Actor Haluk Bilginer was one of only three London-based, Turkish-speaking actors available at the time of casting in 1984. He was originally put forward for the role of Ali Osman along with another actor, Nejdet Salih. Bilginer was Turkish, and Holland and Smith have commented that he "was almost type-casting for the 'peacock' they were looking for', right down to the Bandito moustache and hairy chest!" However, Salih was actually Turkish-Cypriot and had a background "surprisingly similar" to Ali's.

Holland and Smith disagreed about which actor should have the part of Ali; Holland preferred Bilginer, while Smith preferred Salih. Holland believed Bilginer possessed the right "look" and that Salih was not tall or tough-looking enough, "he didn't have the sort of physical presence that put you on your guard." He also believed that Sandy Ratcliff, the actress playing Ali's wife Sue, would have "made mincemeat of [Salih]". Additionally, Holland visioned Ali with a moustache, and unlike Bilginer, Salih was unable to grow one. Conversely, Smith felt that Salih was "the genuine article. Not Turkish, but Turkish-Cypriot. He would have so much actual knowledge to bring to the character [...] He wouldn't have to act the part, he was the part." Both actors were given a script reading with the actress who would play Ali's wife, Sandy Ratcliff, who arrived for the reading 45 minutes late. Bilginer read with Ratcliff first, and Holland and Smith have commented that he "had obviously thought about the part [...] because there was much more physical power in his performance. At one stage Julia and Tony were worried that he might even hit Sandy!" Salih read next, and after being introduced to Ratcliff who apologised for her tardiness, to which Salih replied "Not to worry. Typical bloody woman!" His quip impressed Holland and Smith; they have since commented that Salih almost got the part on the strength of that line alone, as the felt it typified the character perfectly. Salih was eventually given the part of Ali, but as there were only two suitable Turkish speaking actors available, and as Ali would need a brother, Bilginer was given the part of Mehmet Osman.

=== Development ===
Mehmet Osman makes his first appearance on-screen in June 1985, four months after the show originally aired. His arrival coincides with a cot death storyline of Sue and Ali's baby, Hassan Osman. Mehmet appears as a recurring character from 1985 to 1987, setting up a cab firm named Ozcabs from inside Ali's café; however, he becomes a regular in 1988, when both he and his wife Guizin Osman (Ishia Bennison) are made partners in Ali's café, which is renamed Café Osman.

Mehmet is portrayed as a charmer, a rogue and a womaniser. Author of The EastEnders Handbook, Hilary Kingsley, has said of him, "he tries it on with every woman he meets and sometimes succeeds through a combination of good looks and sheer audacity." A serial gambler, Mehmet was shown to steer Ali into various money-losing ploys, and had a combustible marriage to Guizin, who put up with his philandering, as in the Turkish community, that's "what a wife was expected to do".

Described as "the Terrible Turk", Haluk Bilginer was one of the more popular male cast members on EastEnders during the 1980s, and he reportedly received sackfuls of fan mail, "despite playing a villain and a womanising snake". Hilary Kingsley has said that what made the character so popular was Bilginer's Omar Sharif-style good looks and charm. Following the departure of Holland and Smith, Mehmet was eventually written out of the serial in May 1989, in a storyline that signified the disbandment of the Osman family. On-screen, Mehmet returns to his native Cyprus after a fight with Guizin regarding her suspicions about Mehmet's fabricated affair with Sue. The Osman family were among many characters to leave the serial that year. Writer Colin Brake has commented, "the pace of comings and going was fast and furious during 1989, as the programme tried to find a new direction." Bilginer went into musical theatre after leaving EastEnders.

== Storylines ==
Mehmet is a Turkish Cypriot and the older brother of the original owner of the Bridge street café, Ali Osman (Nejdet Salih). He is first seen in Albert Square in June 1985 when he takes part in one of Ali's regular late-night poker games. Like his brother, Mehmet is a serial gambler and whenever he gambles the stakes are often foolishly high. Unlike his brother, Mehmet doesn't live in Walford but Stoke Newington.

In June 1986 Mehmet and Ali start a cab firm called 'OzCabs' from a corner table in Ali's Café. Mehmet is married with three children, but monogamy is one sanctity of marriage that he is more than willing to overlook. Later that month punk Mary Smith (Linda Davidson) catches his eye, and so he bets his sceptical brother £10 that he can get Mary to have sex with him. Mary is well aware that Mehmet's intentions are dishonourable and initially refuses to have sex with him, but Mehmet persists and she finally relents and spends the night with him. A triumphant Mehmet then collects his winnings and gloats to his brother in the café. However, Mary overhears their entire conversation and she then sets about trying to get revenge on him by hoax calling his cab-firm and vandalising his car. Later in the year Mehmet acts as Pat Wicks's (Pam St. Clement) pimp, setting her up with clients on a regular basis and he even persuades Pat to convince Mary to go prostitute herself too. He also gets involved in Kathy Beale's (Gillian Taylforth) Knitting business, later conning her and disappearing with all her profits. After he gets into more trouble with his customers for overcharging on fares and then trying to seduce Hannah Carpenter (Sally Sagoe) — the wife of his employee — the residents of Albert Square decide to confront him. Den Watts (Leslie Grantham), Pete Beale (Peter Dean) and Tony Carpenter (Oscar James) find him and give him a severe beating which involves having his arms pinned behind his back whilst taking a number of blows to the stomach.

Mehmet proceeds to make things infinitely worse for himself soon after, when he stakes his house and business on a bet, loses and swiftly disappears leaving his wife, Guizin Osman (Ishia Bennison), to face up to the consequences. A then homeless Guzin arrives at Ali and his wife Sue's (Sandy Ratcliff) doorstep with the news that Mehmet had beaten her, and she isn't ever returning to him. Ali and Sue are forced to take Guizin and her three children, Murat, Rayif and Emine (Pelin Ahmet) into their one bedroom apartment. Mehmet returns to Walford in May 1987 and he manages to persuade his long suffering wife to give their marriage another chance. However, his promises to Guizin prove to be hollow as soon after he decides that the barmaid Donna Ludlow (Matilda Ziegler) is to be the next sexual conquest. Donna refuses his advances, but can't resist informing Guizin about his offer and Guizin and Donna nearly fight on New Year's Eve that year. Guizin and Mehmet's marriage is highly turbulent and they are always involved in intense arguments, mainly concerning money and gambling. In 1988 Mehmet and Guzin become partners in Ali's café after Sue gives up working to look after her baby. Mehmet often clashes with his wife about the amount of time he takes off to gamble and the way the café is run. Later in the year Mehmet and Ali run up huge gambling debts to Joanne Francis (Pamela Salem), manageress of Strokes wine bar, and who is also a member of the criminal underworld known as The Firm. Desperate for money the two turn to their café employee, Ian Beale (Adam Woodyatt), for a loan. He agrees, but charges his employers 10 percent interest and later, when they cannot meet the repayments, he demands a stake in the café. The brothers refuse, but the debt eventually leads to Ali losing the café to Ian the following year.

Mehmet's marriage goes through some more trouble in 1989, when Ali's wife, Sue, discovers that her husband had been having sex with prostitute, Donna Ludlow. Sue is traumatised by this news and turns to Mehmet for comfort. Seeing her chance for revenge Sue makes a pass at Mehmet, purposefully kissing him in Ali's view. For once Mehmet is innocent, but Ali refuses to believe this and the brothers have a massive fight. Ali divulges Sue and Mehmet's fabricated affair to Guzin, who is unable to forgive her husband's latest infidelity with her sister-in-law. After viciously attacking Mehmet she leaves Walford to return to Northern Cyprus, taking their three children with her. After another huge argument with Sue, Mehmet decides to return to Northern Cyprus in order to win his wife back. His last appearance is in March 1989.

== Reception ==
In 2022, Luke Weir from Surrey Live called Mehmet a "Serial womaniser".

== See also ==
- List of soap opera villains
