= David Scarboro =

British actor (1968–1988)

- Scarboro as Mark Fowler in EastEnders
- Born: 3 February 1968; Sidcup, London, England
- Died: 27 April 1988 (aged 20); Beachy Head, East Sussex, England
- Occupation: Actor
- Years active: 1984–1987
- Television: EastEnders (1985–1987)

David Timothy Scarboro (3 February 1968 – 27 April 1988) was an English actor, best known for portraying Mark Fowler in the British television soap opera EastEnders from the programme's inception until April 1985, and intermittently between December 1985 and December 1987.

== Career ==
=== Early years ===
Scarboro made his acting debut in Good Neighbours, a television drama that aired on BBC in 1984 as part of a series of standalone teleplays for the anthology series Scene.

In the same year, he appeared as a member of troublemaker Gluxo Remington's gang in episodes of the school drama series Grange Hill. The script in his first episode called for both Gluxo and Scarboro's character to chase Samuel "Zammo" McGuire across a children's playground in a park, and at one point during the pursuit jump over a see-saw. Following the jump, Scarboro accidentally stumbled and nearly fell — but somehow managed to right himself and keep going. He was really pleased that the scene was thought to look good and retained in the finished programme.

=== EastEnders ===
From its inception in February 1985 until April of that same year, Scarboro semi-regularly played the part of Mark Fowler in the BBC soap opera EastEnders. The actor did not respond well to the sudden fame the role brought him, and later became very concerned when the writers decided that the character of Mark should become a racist.

Things came to a head one day when the script called for a scene where Mark was to deliver racist abuse to Paul J. Medford's character, Kelvin Carpenter. Scarboro refused to play the scene. After this, it was decided that Scarboro should leave EastEnders. His character was abruptly written out of the programme; one morning, Mark's family arose to discover he had secretly moved away during the night. Mark was neither seen nor heard from for several months.

In December 1985, Scarboro briefly returned to the series in a storyline that saw Mark reunite with his family. His parents had travelled to visit him in Southend-on-Sea, where he had settled with an older woman who had children from an earlier relationship. Scarboro subsequently returned for brief stints in 1986 and 1987, but never returned to the series on a permanent or on-going basis. Scarboro's last EastEnders appearance aired on Christmas Day, 1987.

== Personal life ==
Elements of the tabloid press reported that Scarboro had been fired from the show for turning up late for filming and being uncooperative on set. Away from the series, Scarboro initiated libel proceedings after several national papers published inaccurate stories about his private life, but the press continued to pursue him and his family. The News of the World discovered that Scarboro was in a psychiatric unit, and published photographs of the place. Scarboro subsequently left the unit because he could no longer get adequate treatment, and inaccurate stories about his condition were being published.

== Death ==
Scarboro was found dead at the bottom of Beachy Head on 27 April 1988. He was buried at St Mary's Church, Tatsfield, Surrey. At the inquest into his death, the coroner gave an open verdict. In 1989, David's brother Simon Scarboro presented a documentary about David's life, titled My Brother David.
