= Allan O'Keefe =

British actor

Allan O'Keefe is a British actor, known mostly for his work on British television.

One of his first roles was playing Quando in The Villains (1964), a series of unrelated televised plays, which only have the subject of villainy in common. He later went on to have roles in the Adam Faith television series Budgie (1971) and the supernatural television series What's Next? (1974).

O'Keefe's most notable role was playing PC Fred Render in the successful police drama Z-Cars. He remained in that role from 1971 til the series' went off air in 1978. He went on to play a role in the hospital drama Maybury (1981) and in 1985 he joined the cast of the BBC soap opera EastEnders. O'Keefe played Chris Smith, the father of the wayward punk Mary Smith, played by Linda Davidson. O'Keefe appeared periodically until 1987, when he was introduced as a main cast member. He remained in the role until 1988.

Since his departure O'Keefe has appeared in Emmerdale and Last of the Summer Wine.
