= Douglas Fielding =

British actor (1946–2019)

Douglas Fielding in 2019

Brian Douglas Fielder (6 June 1946 – 26 June 2019) known professionally as Douglas Fielding was a British actor of film and television, best known for playing the role of Sergeant Alec Quilley, previously Police Constable, in the police procedural drama Z-Cars (1969–1978). He later played the first regular policeman Roy Quick in the BBC soap opera EastEnders from 1985 until 1986.

== Career ==
Fielding completed a three-year acting course at the London Academy of Music and Dramatic Art from 1965 to 1968.

He made his television debut in 1968 playing Young Hodge in an episode of Mystery and Imagination. He also appeared in other successful television shows including Softly, Softly, Callan, Blake's 7, Angels, Juliet Bravo, The Bill, ChuckleVision, Family Affairs, and Doctors. In 2000 he returned to EastEnders playing a private investigator called Will.

Fielding appeared opposite Clive Owen in the video game Privateer 2: The Darkening (1996) and his film credits include the drama Holding On (1997) and the drama Hooligan Legacy (2016).

In 2018, it was announced that Fielding would guest star in Series 21 of Silent Witness.

He was the nephew of the sports administrator Dame Marea Hartman.

Fielding died on 26 June 2019, aged 73.
