= Ishia Bennison =

British actress (born 1949)

- Born: 11 August 1949 (age 76)
- Occupation: Actress

Ishia Bennison (born 11 August 1949) is a British actress, best known for her television appearances, although she is also a veteran stage actress. Bennison is originally from Hull in Yorkshire.

== Career ==
One of her earliest roles was a nurse in the 1980 Charlton Heston film The Awakening. She also had roles in the television drama The Chinese Detective (1981) and she played Ruth Lieberman in the BBC drama Kessler (1981). Other notable television credits include Bergerac (1981) and Ursula in a BBC Television Shakespeare adaptation of Much Ado About Nothing (1984).

In 1985 Bennison became a household name whilst playing Guizin Osman, the long-suffering wife of the womanising Turkish Cypriot Mehmet (Haluk Bilginer) in the BBC soap opera EastEnders. She remained in the role until 1989. Bennison has "mixed memories" about her role in EastEnders, commenting in 2003: "It was the start of the soap and the fame was very instant for everybody. You're in everybody's front room and everyone feels they own a bit of you. I'll never forget having to sign people's sickbags on the hovercraft to France. My daughter wouldn't walk down the street with me at the time. She would stay 10 paces behind. I still get recognised from EastEnders. I can't believe it."

Other television credits include The Storyteller (1988); The Bill (1988); Denise Skidmore in the popular ITV drama At Home with the Braithwaites (2000); Mrs. Mawdsley in the long-running soap opera Coronation Street (2000); Holby City (2000); Cath Foxton in Burnside, a spin-off to The Bill (2000, 2001); Casualty (2006); and Hollyoaks: In the City (2006).

In 2004 she starred in the Doctor Who audio series Dalek Empire III and in January 2007 she joined the cast of the successful ITV soap opera Emmerdale as Jackie Stiles – mother of vet receptionist Jo Stiles. She also played the character of 'Doris' in two episodes of the CBBC series Little Howard's Big Question. She played Joyce, a civilian employee at the police station, in the 2014 crime drama Happy Valley.

Bennison has had numerous roles on stage, including Mistress Overdone in the Royal Shakespeare Company's production Measure for Measure, performed at the Theatre Royal in 2003. She also appeared at the Playhouse as the Queen in The Tragedy of Cymbeline (2003). Bennison's previous Shakespearean roles have been with the company Northern Broadsides, which "specialises in performing classical plays in north country accents".

== Personal life ==
While in a relationship with actor Terence Wilton, Bennison gave birth to a daughter, Kate (b. 1969), who would follow in her parents' footsteps by becoming an actress.
