= Marea Hartman =

British athletics sports administrator

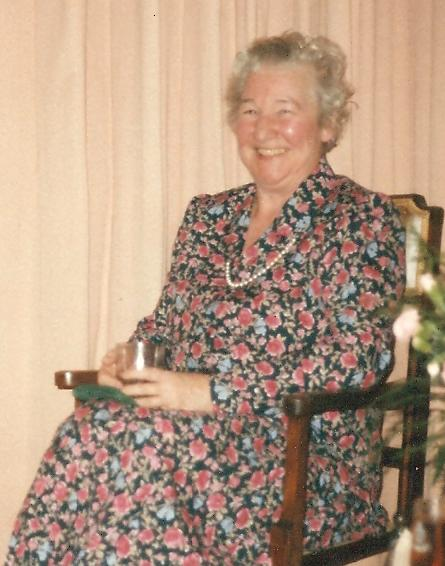
Marea Hartman, Cheam, south London, February 1988

Dame Gladys Marea Hartman DBE (22 June 1920 – 29 August 1994) was a British athletics sports administrator. She was one of the longest-serving and most influential sports administrators in 20th century British athletics. Marea Hartman is credited with the post-World War II integration of British women athletes into full competition and parity with that of their male counterparts. Internationally well respected, she was for thirteen years the chairwoman of the Women's Commission of the International Amateur Athletic Federation. She was also the first woman to serve as president of the Amateur Athletic Association of England, from 1991 to 1994.

== Early life ==
Hartman was born in Clapham in London. Her father was Swiss and had left Switzerland to work in London where he found a position as a caterer. Marea possessed natural ability as a runner and in the early 1930s as a member of Spartan Ladies Athletic Club she was representing her club and her county of Surrey. She left home at an early age lodging in Clapham in south London and working for the paper manufacturers Bowater as a human resources officer devoting her non-work time to women's athletics. Any chances that Hartman would become an International athlete were ended by the onset of war during which conflict she served in the Welfare Division based in London.

== Eminent sports administrator ==
Hartman was one of the few women, along with Dorothy Nelson Neal and Vera Searle, who reached senior positions in the male-dominated world of post-war British athletics. She started off in 1945 as Hon. Treasurer of Spartan Ladies and early in 1950, aged 29, she was elected Hon. Treasurer of the national governing body, the Women's AAA.

She was appointed team manager of the British women's team for the Melbourne Olympic Games of 1956, holding this position until 1978, a period that encompassed five Olympic Games and a host of other important meetings including the European championships and the Commonwealth Games. In the 1950s female athletics had little or no media profile, and it is to Hartman's credit that she was able to secure sponsorship deals with a number of manufacturers of well-known brands, including Unilever products Bovril and Sunsilk.

Hartman was insistent on equality for women athletes, energetically arguing for their participation in a range of events that had previously been denied to them, and she successfully navigated the (sometimes) reactionary world of British amateur athletics with skill and sociability. In latter years some athletes saw her as a conservative figure, and in the late 1970s she and fellow sports administrator Arthur Gold were the subject of some fierce criticism from sections of the press primed by elements within British athletics. It was essentially the new guard versus the old, with Hartman seen by some as part of the reactionary old guard. (Note: Tom McNab, a contemporary coach refers to the old guard as the 'Blazerati' A Brief History of Handicaps- Tom McNab England Athletics East Region Coaching Journal, volume 1.)

Throughout her various tenures Hartman discharged her duties within the sport in an honorary capacity without financial remuneration. A supporter of Pierre de Coubertin's first principle of participation she nevertheless, navigated the growing demands for althletes to benefit from financial remuneration. Once it was clear that the sport at the elite level was entering a professional era she argued for equality for women athletes.In her younger years she was well suited to her role as Team Manager, where she often had to reassure nervously strung international athletes. She was closely associated with the historic triumphs of Mary Rand and Ann Packer at the 1964 Tokyo Olympics. when Lillian Board, the 400-metre silver medalist at the 1968 Mexico Olympics, was diagnosed with terminal cancer, Hartman was instrumental in the setting up a memorial trophy, the Lillian Board Trophy, awarded annually to the winner of the England Senior Championships 800m.

Hartman was selected Chairwoman of the Women's Commission of the IAAF in 1968, a post she held until 1981. As Honorary Secretary of the Women's AAA she campaigned against the use of stimulants and performance-enhancing drugs, and was a founder member of the Drugs Abuse Sub-Committee as early as 1968. When British athletics administration received a much needed overhaul in 1991, Hartman became President of the British Athletics Federation. She never married or had children. Actor Douglas Fielding was her nephew.

== Honours ==
She was appointed Member of the Order of the British Empire (MBE) in the 1966 New Year Honours and later advanced to Commander of the same Order (CBE) in the 1978 New Year Honours. In 1993, she was awarded the Prince Chichibu Award for her impact on women's athletics in Japan.

She was promoted to Dame Commander of the Order of the British Empire (DBE) in the 1994 New Year Honours, "for services to Sport, particularly Athletics"; she died in Caterham, Surrey eight months later following a long illness.

== Positions held ==
Her official positions included:

- Hon Treasurer, Women's Amateur Athletics Association (AAA), 1950–60
- Hon Secretary, Women's AAA, 1960–91; Vice-Chairman 1980–91
- Team Manager English and British Women's Athletics Teams, 1956–79
- Member, Women's Commission of IAAF 1958 – 94, Chairwoman, 1968–81
- Hon Treasurer, British Amateur Athletics Board, 1972–84, Chairwoman 1989–91
- President Amateur Athletic Association of England, 1991–94
- President of the British Athletics Federation, 1991–94

== Cultural references ==
- Marea Hartman was one of five "Women of Achievement" selected for a set of British stamps issued in August 1996. The others were Dorothy Hodgkin (scientist), Margot Fonteyn (ballerina/choreographer), Elisabeth Frink (sculptor) and Daphne du Maurier (writer).
- The Dame Marea Hartman Award is awarded annually to the English female athlete who is adjudged to be the outstanding athlete of the year. In 1997 the Award was made to Christine Ohuruogu of Newham and Essex Beagles. Others to hold the award include Becky Lyne of Hallamshire Harriers, a recipient in 2006 and Jessica Ennis of the City of Sheffield Athletic Club who won the award in 2010 and 2012.
