= Tony Carpenter =

Fictional character from the BBC soap opera EastEnders

- EastEnders character
- Portrayed by: Oscar James
- Duration: 1985–1987
- First appearance: Episode 4; 28 February 1985
- Last appearance: Episode 239; 28 May 1987
- Created by: Tony Holland and Julia Smith
In-universe information
- Occupation: Builder; Minicab driver
- Wife: A wife (backstory); Hannah Carpenter
- Sons: Kelvin Carpenter
- Daughters: Cassie Carpenter

Tony Carpenter is a fictional character from the BBC soap opera EastEnders, played by Oscar James, from 28 February 1985 until 28 May 1987.

Tony tries to have himself a successful business and steady home for his family, but nothing he does is ever good enough for his wife.

== Character creation and development ==
Tony Carpenter was one of the original twenty-three characters invented by the creators of EastEnders, Tony Holland and Julia Smith. Tony was originally intended to be named Alan, and his son Kelvin Carpenter was originally named Kevin. It was a creative decision. They were the first black characters to appear in the soap. Black and Asian characters were two ethnic minorities that had previously been under-represented in British soap before EastEnders aired. Holland and Smith knew that for the soap to succeed there needed to be a varied group of characters, so that several different sections of the audience had someone to identify with. Additionally, if the programme was to be realistic, it had to reflect the cross-section of society that actually existed in the real location. For these reasons, different sexes, ages, classes, religions and races were all included in the original character line-up. Both Holland and Smith had been at the forefront of the move towards 'integrated casting' in television and had encountered an array of ethnic diversities in the process. Even though the ethnic minority groups were deemed the hardest to research, Holland and Smith called upon their contacts to relay information about their origins and lifestyles and were then able to portray Walford's most recent immigrants more realistically.

Tony's original character outline as written by Smith and Holland appeared in an abridged form in their book, EastEnders: The Inside Story (In this passage, Tony will be referred to as Alan).

"Alan is Caribbean: one of the "came here when ten" from an idylic life in Trinidad with his gran....A confusing childhood and, at first, he hated England. He felt different, felt coloured, suffered abuse from the white kids...He met Hannah. She was several cuts above him socially. He liked the idea of a "princess" and she liked the idea of a "a bit of rough". In the beginning this made their marriage all the more exciting...But he was short on staying power...In and out of jobs...Boredom always setting in early...A constant desire for change at any price...Hannah meanwhile became more and more stubborn...They set themselves on a collision course...Hannah became too housebound, houseproud, too disciplined with the two children, too rigid, not seeing the wood for the trees. Alan became too anarchic, too sleeping-around, too devil-may-care and up-yours, frequently not seeing the wood for the booze...Perhaps if they split, they could find themselves again?...Alan has bought a house in the Square. His sixteen year old son Kevin wants to stay with his dad...How would Alan react to the discovery that Kevin's visiting his mother? How would Kevin react to his father trying to smuggle a woman for the night? And, how would dad react to son doing the same thing? What happens when they're competing for the same woman? As he wants to leave his mark - physically - on the walls of the building, so he wants to leave his mark on his son. Will Kevin take it, or leave it?...The house is the framework. The container...It will change its personality as the owners find theirs..." (page 58-59).

Alan's name was later changed to Tony following the development of the character of Ali Osman and Holland and Smith decided they couldn't have two male characters with such similar-sounding names.

Oscar James, an experienced television and theatre actor, was chosen to play the role. James was physically much bigger than they'd originally had in mind, however they felt that his interpretation of Tony would be expansive and get noticed. They also thought it was a nice idea for father and son to be not only different in ages, but different physical types as well. Storywise it was felt it would be possible to build on this and also give them different attitudes.

Tony's storylines mainly centred on his developing relationship with his son, and marital issues with his wife. Before the series began it was decided that Hannah (Tony's wife) plus their other child, would come back into Tony's life for the sake of the family - but not stay around too long because the neighbourhood would appal her. This was eventually recreated on-screen.

James had initially been full of praise for the way the team had chosen to depict a black family. However, shortly before he left the series in 1987, he controversially criticised EastEnders and the BBC for not promoting their black or other ethnic minority characters:

The powers that be do not think I am interesting enough. Is it because I am a member of an ethnic minority? How often do you see Paul J. Medford being publicised?...It's as though the BBC are playing us down. I can't believe the white majority of the public are against blacks being stars. They don't give a damn.

Tony Carpenter lasted in the show for two years and was the fourth of the original twenty three characters to leave the show after Saeed Jeffery, Andy O'Brien and Debbie Wilkins. Tony returned to Trinidad to search for his roots.

== Storylines ==
Trinidadian born Tony is married to his second wife, Hannah Carpenter (Sally Sagoe), with whom he has two children, Kelvin (Paul J. Medford) and Cassie Carpenter (Delanie Forbes). However, Tony and Hannah are separated and Hannah is in a relationship with another man. Kelvin lives with Tony, while Cassie stays with Hannah.

Tony has various altercations with the local villain Nick Cotton (John Altman), and is understandably furious when he discovers that Nick has joined a racist organisation. After Nick taunts Kelvin about the colour of his skin, Tony teaches him a lesson, which at least manages to scare him out of spreading his racial hatred for a while.

In February 1985, Tony secures himself a job renovating The Queen Victoria public house and gives the unemployed Arthur Fowler (Bill Treacher) a job as his aid. It is whilst he is working here that Tony gains the interest of the married landlady Angie Watts (Anita Dobson). Angie has grown tired of her cheating husband, Den Watts (Leslie Grantham), and whilst he is on a holiday in Spain with his mistress, Angie seduces Tony and they embark on an affair. Tony takes the relationship seriously, but Angie is only using him to get back at Den and make him jealous. The affair is conducted in secret, but after Angie initiates a kiss in The Queen Vic with Tony, she is caught by her adoptive daughter, Sharon Watts (Letitia Dean). Angie is forced to use bribery to keep her daughter from informing her husband. Upon Den's return, Angie calls off the affair but it is not long before Sharon tells her father that Angie has been unfaithful. However, Den cares more about his reputation than her and tells her that he does not care about the affair, so long as it is done discreetly. Tony is very hurt by the whole ordeal, but he is even more concerned for his own safety, should Den find out that it was he whom his wife was seeing. Tony's identity is never disclosed to Den, though Den later works it out.

Later, Hannah arrives at Tony's house with the disturbing news that her new lover, Neville Agard (Gordon Case), had been beating both her and their daughter Cassie. Tony is furious and promptly confronts Neville, returning later with Hannah and Cassie's belongings and a cut lip. Tony and Hannah reunite and she and Cassie move in, however, Tony is confused when Hannah wants to live in the flat above Tony's instead of with him. Problems still persist, however, and Hannah regularly nags Tony and makes it clear to him that Walford is not good enough for her. Things reach a climax when Tony hits Mehmet Osman (Haluk Bilginer) the following year for making a pass at Hannah. Hannah is furious and cannot condone Tony's violent actions. Hannah subsequently decides that the marriage is over and she leaves Walford to live with her sister.

Tony spends the rest of the year doing odd-jobs and driving a car for Ali Osman's (Nejdet Salih) cab firm. He gets himself into trouble when he buys some stolen silverware from Nick, who later tries to blackmail him. Tony tires of life in Walford and a few months later he departs Albert Square for Trinidad, leaving Kelvin in charge of his property.

== Reception ==
In 2022, Luke Weir from Surrey Live noted how the character "struggled to do anything that was good enough for nagging wife".
