= Delanie Forbes =

English actress

- Born: May 1976 (age 50); Sidcup, London, England
- Occupation: Actress
- Notable work: EastEnders

Delanie Forbes (born May 1976 in Sidcup, London) is an English actress based in East Sussex. She is best known for her childhood role of Cassie Carpenter in BBC's EastEnders.

Forbes attended a secondary school in Eltham, South East London, and she was also a full-time student at the Sylvia Young Theatre School. She made her first appearance on television at the age of three, in a BBC play. In 1985 she was cast in her most notable role to date. She played the character Cassie—the daughter of Tony Carpenter (Oscar James)—in the BBC soap opera EastEnders. She remained in the role until December 1986.

In 1989 she appeared in an episode of the ITV drama, The Bill, and in 2001 she appeared as Anne-Marie in Love Is Not Enough, a film about perseverance in the face of adversity, written and directed by Mark Norfolk.
