= Christopher McHallem =

British actor, writer, musician and director (born 1960)

- Born: 1960 (age 65–66); Mercedes, Uruguay
- Occupations: Actor; director; musician; writer
- Notable work: EastEnders

Christopher McHallem (born 1960) is a British actor, writer, musician and director.

== Early life ==
McHallem was born to Scottish parents in Mercedes, Uruguay, where his mother was working as a geologist. His birth was registered in Uruguay, but his father, who was in England registered it there with a different date. However, a third different date was entered on his birth certificate giving him three birth dates – two for May 1960 and one for November 1961. McHallem moved to London when he was two years old and he lived in various places in the city, including Ealing, Acton, Shepherd's Bush, and Brixton.

He had 70 different jobs before undertaking a three-year course at the Central School of Speech and Drama.

== Career ==
McHallem began his career in 1977 with the punk rock/post-punk band the Transmitters under the pseudonym "Dexter O'Brian", but left the band shortly after its formation to pursue a career in acting.

From 1987 to 1990, he played the role of Rod Norman, the kind-hearted roadie in the BBC soap opera, EastEnders. After leaving EastEnders, he starred in a stage production of A Clockwork Orange in the West End. He then played Hal in a touring production of Joe Orton's Loot, alongside Peter O'Brien.

McHallem appeared in the 1991 film Edward II; the ITV drama Heartbeat (1993); in the Steve Coogan comedy sketch show Coogan's Run (1995); the 1998 film St. Ives; the 2003 film Girl with a Pearl Earring - a screenplay adapted from the Tracy Chevalier novel of the same name; and the 2005 film Breakfast on Pluto among others.

In 2007, he appeared in Becoming Jane, followed by House of Boys in 2009.

In addition to acting, McHallem is also a script writer. In 1997, he co-wrote television film Black Velvet Band for his former EastEnders co-stars Todd Carty and Nick Berry to appear in. In 2001, he wrote and directed the short film This Little Piggy about two police officers in Dublin, who try to find a missing finger at a cab rank. He was also one of the writers on the Liza Tarbuck comedy Linda Green (2001) and was the writer of the television comedy Big Dippers in 2005, which starred James Nesbitt.

McHallem is a singer and songwriter with Five Mile Family. A keen football fan and player, he has played at the home of many clubs in charity games.

His radio play, Farkham Hall at Christmas, was broadcast in December 2015 on Ireland's RTE Radio 1.
