= Judith Jacob =

British actress (born 1961)

- Born: 13 December 1961 (age 64)
- Education: Anna Scher Theatre
- Occupation: Actress
- Known for: Founding member of the BiBi Crew
- Notable work: Carmel Roberts in EastEnders
- Television: No Problem! (1983–85); EastEnders (1986–89); The Real McCoy (1991)

Judith Jacob (born 13 December 1961) is a British actress best known for her role as the health visitor Carmel Roberts in the BBC soap opera EastEnders, a role she played from 1986 to 1989. During her period in Albert Square, her character suffered from severe marital abuse and her husband's attempted murder and eventual separation. She was a founding member of BiBi Crew, Britain's first comedy troupe made up entirely of Black actresses, founded in 1991. She also launched at the Hackney Empire the live talk show Judith Jacob Yabba Yabbas With Friends.

== Career ==
Jacob attended London's Anna Scher Theatre, first going there at the age of 12, and making her first appearance on television at the age of 13 in the BBC series Play for Today. Two of her drama school classmates were also future EastEnders actors, Susan Tully (who played Michelle Fowler) and Phil Daniels (as Kevin Wicks). Before landing her role on EastEnders, Jacob was a founding member of the Black Theatre Co-operative (BTC), a London collective that developed opportunities for actors, writers and directors to reflect a multi-cultural Britain through both stage work and television.

Before her role in EastEnders, Jacob had been a regular cast member in the hospital drama Angels (1979–81) and the Channel 4 sitcom No Problem! (1983–85). Her other television credits include roles in the comedy sketch-show The Real McCoy (1991); The Queen's Nose (1995); Holby City (2003); Doctors (2003); and My Family (2004).

In 1991, she was a founding member of BiBi Crew, Britain's first comedy troupe made up entirely of Black actresses.

She featured as a prison guard in the 2006 drama Provoked (2006), which told the true story of a Punjabi woman named Kiranjit Ahluwalia, who left India to marry a London-based man, only to be badly abused, subsequently ending up in prison for murdering her abusive husband.

In May–June 2009, Jacob hosted Judith Jacob Yabba Yabbas with Friends in the Marie Lloyd Bar at the Hackney Empire, interviewing performing friends "to find out what makes them tick". The singers, actors and comedians participating included Felix Dexter, Janet Kay, Curtis Walker, Wayne Marshall, Victor Romero Evans, Tameka Empson and Noel McKoy. Explaining her reason for launching the show, Jacob has said: "I wanted to find out the backstories of some of the people that I admired. People tend to see success, but they rarely get to see the work that people put in that enabled them to get to where they are."

Her recent stage credits include joining the cast of Barry Reckord's play White Witch, at the Bloomsbury Theatre in 2021.

Jacob's daughter Aisha worked with her mother on EastEnders during her time on the series in the 1980s, playing her young niece Aisha Roberts. She followed her mother's career path by also becoming an actress, and is now known as Aisha Jacob Williams.
