= Sally Sagoe =

English former actress

Sally Sagoe (born 1953 in London) is an English former actress.

She made her stage debut in Zigger Zagger in 1967 with the National Youth Theatre. She first entered showbusiness on a cruise liner in the Pacific, later working extensively as a singer with her Sally Sagoe Band.

One of her first notable acting roles was playing Celia in the 1985 Joseph Losey film Steaming. That same year she was offered a role in the BBC soap opera EastEnders. She played Hannah Carpenter, the religious and stern wife of the Trinidadian carpenter Tony (played by Oscar James). She remained in the role until 1987.

Her one television role since leaving EastEnders was in the futuristic children's television series The Tomorrow People (1994–1995) about a group of teenagers with the ability to teleport. She played Hasana Jackson, whose daughter Ami (Naomie Harris) is one of the titular teenagers.

On stage Sagoe has played Rose Maxson in the play Fences at the Garrick Theatre in 1990 and Carrie in the play Nine Hundred Oneonta at the Lyric Studio, Hammersmith in 1994.

Since these appearances Sagoe has retired from acting. In 2002 she became the entertainments manager for Thomson's Holidays cruise ship "The Emerald". By 2007 she was cruise director on P&O with some time spent on Arcadia. More recently she is entertainment director on Cunard, where she served on the Queen Victoria between 2013 and 2018.
