= Paul J. Medford =

British actor

- Born: Paul Junior Medford; London, England
- Education: Italia Conti Academy of Theatre Arts
- Occupations: Actor, performer
- Years active: 1977–present
- Notable work: Kelvin Carpenter in EastEnders, Little Mo in Five Guys Named Moe, Blake Wordsworth in The Story Makers

Paul Junior Medford is a British actor. He is best known for playing the role of Kelvin Carpenter in the BBC soap opera EastEnders from 1985-87. His character Kelvin was one of the original characters on the show, and Medford has since appeared in numerous West End musicals, including a long stage show Five Guys Named Moe.

== Early life ==
Medford is from Ealing, west London and is of Barbadian descent. He attended the Barbara Speake Stage School and the Italia Conti Academy for ten years.

== Career ==
Medford appeared in several feature films and television programmes, including Return of the Saint (1978) and The Professionals (1983).

In 1985, Medford became one of the original cast of the BBC's new soap opera, EastEnders. He played Kelvin, the son of Tony Carpenter (Oscar James), for over two years. During his time on EastEnders Medford managed minor musical chart success with fellow EastEnders actor Letitia Dean, who played Sharon Watts. A song written for the pair as part of a storyline on the programme prompted them to release a single entitled "Something Outa Nothing", which reached #12 in the UK singles chart in November 1986.

Kelvin was one of the characters in the show's early years and Medford remained in the serial following the departures of all of his on-screen family. He eventually quit the role in 1987 in order to follow his ambition of becoming a singer/dancer. His character left Walford to attend a computing course at college, but was not present for his own leaving party; as Medford's contract had already ended and the reason given for this on-screen was that Kelvin "dislikes goodbyes".

Kelvin has been mentioned several times over the years but has never reappeared on the show since his departure.

Medford is a trained singer with a "high baritone" range and his dancing repertoire includes tap, ballet, jazz, contemporary and Latin. After leaving EastEnders, he appeared in several West End musicals, including The Lion King as Banzai the Hyena; as Little Mo in Five Guys Named Moe; as Fitzroy in The Queen And I and as Hud in Hair among others.

He played Mr Beauregarde in Charlie and the Chocolate Factory the Musical at Drury Lane in May 2013.

Medford's other television credits include: This Life (1997), Invasion: Earth (1998); Casualty (2003) and as the presenter 'Blake Wordsworth' in the children's BBC programme The Story Makers (2004).

In June 2019, Medford was named Vice President of Unscripted, Current Series at Nickelodeon.

== Bibliography ==
- Holmstrom, John. The Moving Picture Boy: An International Encyclopaedia from 1895 to 1995. Norwich, Michael Russell, 1996, p. 369.
