= Linda Davidson =

Canadian-British former actress and writer (born 1964)

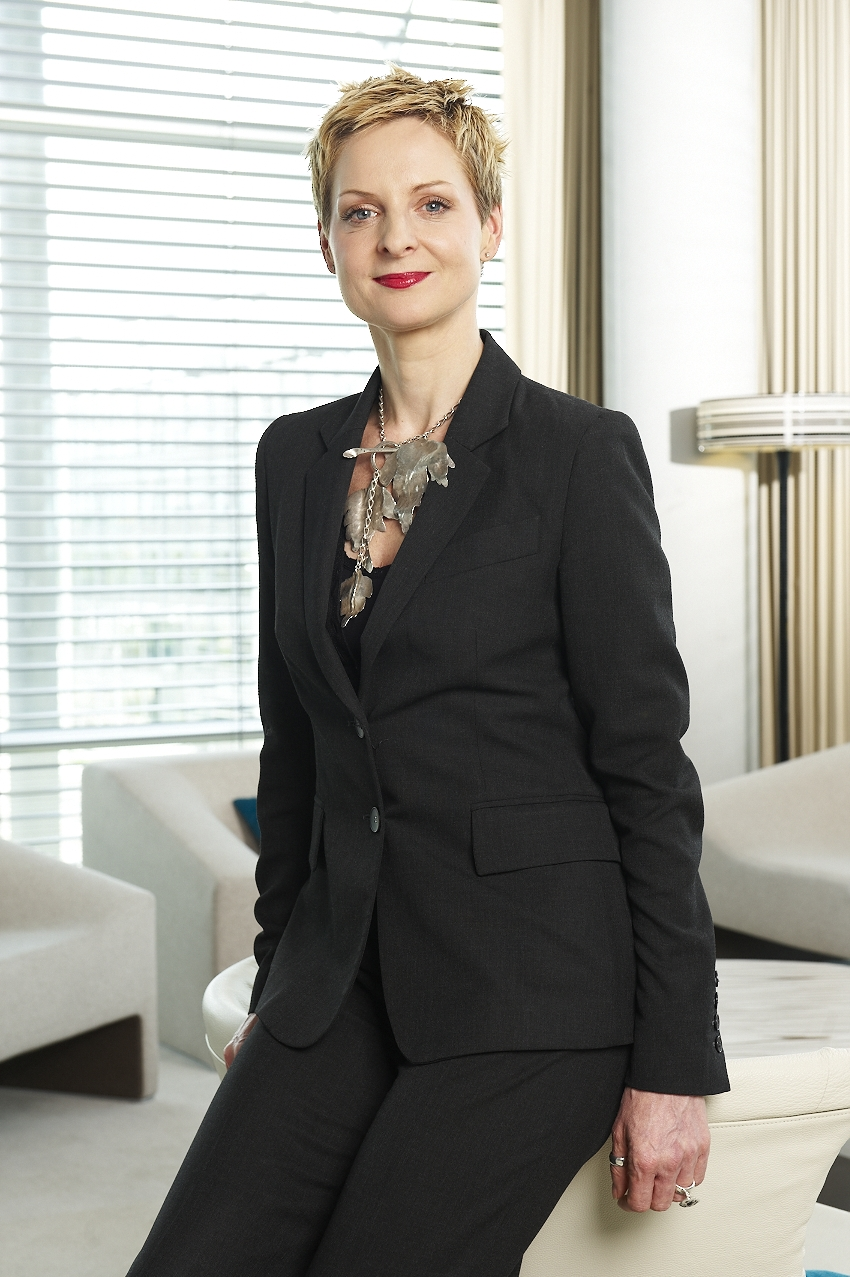
- Born: Linda Davidson; 18 June 1964 (age 62); Toronto, Ontario, Canada
- Occupation: Actress • writer
- Years active: 1984–1998, 2019, 2022
- Known for: Role of Mary Smith in EastEnders (1985–1988, 2019, 2022)
- Children: 1

Linda Davidson (born 18 June 1964) is a Canadian-British former actress and writer, who is best known for playing the wayward punk Mary Smith in the BBC soap opera, EastEnders. Mary was one of the serial's original characters; Davidson played her from March 1985 to May 1988 and again for two episodes in 2019 and 2022 respectively. Away from EastEnders, Davidson appeared in various television programmes and on stage. However, she stopped performing in the late 1990s. She went on to work in digital media for the BBC and Channel 4 and later joined Discovery Communications.

== Career ==
=== Performing ===
Davidson began as an actress and dancer. She attended drama school, the Italia Conti Academy in London, and moved into television acting.

Her big television break came in 1984, when she secured the role of Mary Smith, in the fledgling BBC serial drama, EastEnders; she first appeared on-screen as Mary in March 1985. During Davidson's time on the show her character was involved in storylines about prostitution, unemployment, drugs and the taking into care of her child, Annie, by social services. She quit EastEnders in 1988, when she was offered a Steven Berkoff play.

Davidson went on to act in First of the Summer Wine (1988); Bulman; Casualty (1990); The House of Eliott (1992); Maria's Child (1992); The Bill (1993); and 10 x 10: The Guinea Pig (1998). She also appeared in various theatre productions; notably, she played the role of Columbia in the first West End revival of The Rocky Horror Show (1990).

Despite retiring from acting, Davidson agreed to reprise her role of Mary Smith in EastEnders for a single episode in 2019, and then for the funeral of Dot Branning (June Brown) in 2022.

=== Media career ===
Davidson developed an interest in writing and worked as a TV sit-com writer, director and voiceover actress. Some of her stories were published and she had several scripts for film and television optioned, but ultimately the projects did not go ahead.

Her interest in writing and the internet signified the next stage of her career. She wrote for BBC Online, making contributions to Tomorrow's World and Good Homes online. In the mid 90s she was in charge of all the BBC's drama websites, including the EastEnders website. She also worked as the editor of E4 Interactive in the 2000s.

== Personal life ==
Davidson emigrated from Canada to Southport, Lancashire, England as a child. She now resides in London. During the 1980s, she dated Nejdet Salih/Adamson, her co-star on EastEnders who played Ali Osman. She now has a partner with whom she has a son.

== Filmography ==
Year	Title	Role
1985–1988, 2019, 2022	EastEnders	Mary Smith (241 episodes)
1988–1989	First of the Summer Wine	Anita Pillsworth
1990	Casualty	Melissa
1992	Screen Two	Danielle
1993	The Bill	Sarah Wallace
