= Charlie Cotton =

Fictional character from the BBC soap opera EastEnders

- EastEnders character
- Portrayed by: Christopher Hancock
- Duration: 1986–1990
- First appearance: Episode 110; 6 March 1986
- Last appearance: Episode 559; 14 June 1990
- Introduced by: Julia Smith (1986); Mike Gibbon (1989); Michael Ferguson (1990)
- Book appearances: The Baffled Heart
- Spin-off appearances: Return of Nick Cotton (2000)
In-universe information
- Other names: Tommy Leggett
- Occupation: Lorry driver; Con artist; Handler of stolen goods
- Wife: Dot Colwell (until 1991); Joan Leggett (void); Rose Taylor (void)
- Sons: Nick Cotton; Tom "Rocky" Cotton; Andrew Cotton
- Grandsons: Ashley Cotton; Charlie Cotton
- Granddaughters: Dotty Cotton
- Uncles: Bill Cotton
- First cousins: Nell Cotton; Ron

Charlie Cotton is a fictional character from the BBC soap opera EastEnders, played by Christopher Hancock. Charlie is a recurring character, introduced in March 1986 as the estranged husband of established character Dot Cotton (June Brown). He appears in stints until producers made the decision to kill the character off-screen in 1991 in order to aid development of characters connected to him. June Brown, who plays Dot, was openly against the killing of Charlie. Charlie appears one last time in the October 2000 spin-off, Return of Nick Cotton, as an apparition, warning his son Nick (John Altman) to change his ways.

== Creation and development ==
Charlie Cotton, the husband of Dot Cotton (June Brown), is a semi-regular character who comes and goes throughout his duration in the show; he joined in 1986, 13 months after the soap's launch. Depicted as bigamous and a conman, Charlie typically reappears in the show whenever he needs money or temporary accommodation and, because of Dot's Christian ideals regarding forgiveness, Charlie is always permitted to return.

According to Christopher Hancock, Charlie is "a truly revolting character, a loser" and the character has been described as a "despicable small-time villain [...] lazy and pathetic". Author Kate Lock has described Charlie as a "sly, shifty, weaselly man". In order to become the character of Charlie, Hancock wore stick-on sideburns.

Producers decided to kill Charlie off in 1991; Charlie died off-screen after having a motor accident in his lorry. The decision to kill Charlie was taken in order to reintroduce Charlie's son, Nick (John Altman). Nick had been involved in a storyline that saw him attempt to poison Dot in 1990, and producers felt that in order for Dot to allow Nick back into her life again, something major had to occur in her narrative, that being the death of her husband. Storyline editor, Andrew Holden, has discussed this in the EastEnders Handbook publication in 1991: "We wanted to bring Nick Cotton back and we also wanted to push Dot forward and change her life. But the problem was how? The last time we saw Nick he was attempting to kill his mother. Dot isn't a fool so we knew getting them back together was like a three card trick. How do we get out of this? So we made [Nick] a heroin addict. That made him vulnerable, in a mess and needing his mother to get money for him. We then had to kill Charlie because I figured that only in a state of shock and uncertainty about her belief in God would Dot contemplate forgiving Nick and attempting to reform him. She decides to believe that she can make a decent human being of Nick. She feels it's her last chance. As a widow Dot enters new territory. Dot's snobbery is based on ludicrous misconceptions, one of which is that she is better than [her friend] Ethel because she has a husband. She is going to have a lot of scope [...] Dot's life is going to change."

Actress June Brown was opposed to the killing of Charlie and she attempted to get the programme makers to change their minds. She comments, "I was very unhappy to learn that Charlie would be killed off. I would have preferred if they'd left the door open for him to possibly return one day. I went to see the writers and put this forward. I suggested that there could be some uncertainty about the body. Charlie may have picked up a hitch-hiker and he was the one who died. John Altman, who plays Nick, was also sorry about Charlie. We weren't thinking just about Christopher Hancock, who played Charlie so well, it was that we liked the character and it seemed a waste. But I was too late, I couldn't change their minds. In the past I have talked things through and I was listened to". The episode Dot is told about Charlie's death, written by Linda Dearsley, aired on 11 July 1991, and was dominated by Dot's reaction to Charlie's death and her trip to identify his body. It is selected by writer Colin Brake as one of 1991's episodes of the year.

The character appears one last time, brought back as an apparition/ghost, in a dream sequence experienced by Nick in 2000. The episode is entitled EastEnders: Return of Nick Cotton. Christopher Hancock, the actor who portrayed Charlie, died four years later.

== Storylines ==
Charlie deserted Dot Cotton (June Brown) in the late 1950s after two years of marriage when she was expecting their son, Nick (John Altman). He then had an affair with her sister, Rose Taylor (Polly Perkins) and fathered another son, Andrew (Ricky Grover) with her.

He returns to the Square in 1986 after nearly 30 years away and cons Dot into believing he has come back for good and changed his ways and then disappears as soon as he has some of her money. In 1987, he meets Nick (now in his late twenties) for the first time when they both coincidentally visit Dot. Charlie and Nick hate each other and both try to get rid of each other so they can con Dot. Charlie discovers Nick has cheated some of his friends out of money and has been involved in some house burglaries and that is why he is hiding at Dot's house. He uses this to try to get rid of him by teaming with Graham Clark (Gary Webster), an old friend of Nick, and wants to get back at him for going to prison for Nick's crime. Graham forces Nick to leave Walford but before Nick leaves, he tells Dot that Charlie grassed him to the people who were looking for him. Dot gets angry and tells Charlie to leave too.

Charlie resurfaces in 1989 after breaking his leg and imposes himself on Dot once again. During this time, he exposes Hazel's (Virginia Fiol) deception about being married to Nick and having his child, which devastates Dot who is enjoying being a grandmother. Joan Leggett (Rhoda Lewis) comes looking for Charlie several weeks later and tells Dot about their bigamous marriage. Charlie's double life is exposed and it is revealed he had told Joan his name was Tommy. After being confronted by both women and humiliated in the pub, Charlie flees. He returns the next year to con Dot out of her bingo money and he finds that Nick is already plotting to steal her winnings by poisoning her, but Nick soon backs out with the persuasion of Charlie. Unfortunately just when Charlie is trying to tell Dot that Nick is going to poison her and he stops him, Dot tells him to leave once again, not believing that Nick would do such a thing. Nick then leaves the Square after saying goodbye to Dot and her and Charlie have one final drink in the Vic before he gets his things at the B&B and leaves the Square for good.

In July 1991, Dot receives news that Charlie has died in a lorry accident but his death is not shown on-screen. However, in October 2000 he returns briefly as a ghost in Nick's dream in a special spin-off episode The Return of Nick Cotton. He warns Nick that something terrible is about to happen. This proves somewhat prophetic as Nick's teenage son, Ashley (Frankie Fitzgerald), is killed in a motorcycle accident some months later. More than a decade later, Rose reveals to Dot she married Charlie and confirms he was the father of her son, Andrew, meaning Charlie was a polygamist. Dot blames Rose for Charlie's disloyalty and initially refuses to speak to or acknowledge her, but Rose convinces Dot that Charlie was lying to both of them and he is not worth wasting her energy on. In 2021, it is revealed that Charlie has yet another son, Tom "Rocky" Cotton (Brian Conley).
