= Dot Cotton =

Fictional character from EastEnders

- EastEnders character
- June Brown as Dot Cotton (2013)
- Portrayed by: June Brown; Tallulah Pitt-Brown (flashback)
- Duration: 1985–1993, 1997–2020
- First appearance: Episode 40; 4 July 1985
- Last appearance: Episode 6066; 21 January 2020
- Created by: Julia Smith and Tony Holland
- Introduced by: Julia Smith (1985); Jane Harris (1997)
- Book appearances: The Baffled Heart
- Spin-off appearances: Dot's Story (2003); EastEnders: E20 (2011); Dorothy Branning: The Next Chapter (2013)
- Dot in EastEnders: Dot's Story, played by Tallulah Pitt-Brown.
In-universe information
- Other names: Dorothy Colwell; Dot Branning
- Occupation: Launderette assistant and manager Waitress; Taxicab controller
- Family: Branning
- Father: Bob Colwell
- Mother: Martha Taylor
- Half-brothers: Gerry Colwell; Tim Taylor
- Half-sisters: Rose Cotton
- Husband: Charlie Cotton (until 1991); Jim Branning (2002–2015)
- Sons: Nick Cotton
- Stepsons: Derek Branning; Max Branning; Jack Branning
- Stepdaughters: April Branning; Carol Jackson; Suzy Branning
- Grandsons: Charlie Cotton; Ashley Cotton
- Granddaughters: Dotty Cotton
- Nephews: Andrew Cotton
- Other relatives: Matthew Mitchell Cotton; Reiss Colwell

Dot Cotton (also Branning) is a fictional character from the BBC soap opera EastEnders, portrayed by June Brown. In a special episode entitled EastEnders: Dot's Story (2003) a young Dot was played by Tallulah Pitt-Brown in flashbacks. A tragicomic character, Dot was known for her devout Christian faith, gossiping, chain smoking, hypochondria, and motherly attitude to those in need.

Dot first appeared in EastEnders in July 1985 as the mother of notorious criminal and original character Nick Cotton (John Altman). The character worked as a launderette assistant for most of that time, along with original character Pauline Fowler (Wendy Richard), and was close friends with original characters Ethel Skinner (Gretchen Franklin) and Lou Beale (Anna Wing). Dot moved away with her son and his family in 1993. In reality, Brown left the show in 1993, unhappy with the development of her character and unhappy with the producer's decision to axe her friend Peter Dean, who played Pete Beale. Brown returned to the role in April 1997, and on 28 April 2017, Dot overtook Pat Butcher (Pam St Clement) as the second-longest-serving character in EastEnders, surpassed only by original character Ian Beale (Adam Woodyatt). In April 2012, Brown took a six-month break from the show to write her memoirs. Dot temporarily departed on 18 May 2012. She returned on 14 January 2013. In February 2015, Dot began appearing less frequently due to Brown gradually losing her eyesight; this aspect of her life was written into her character the following year. Brown departed the serial in January 2020 without a proper exit storyline. The following month, Brown announced that her appearance in January would be the character's last, as she was dissatisfied with the storylines being given to her. Following Brown's death on 3 April 2022, the character of Dot died off-screen on 1 December 2022. A special episode centring on Dot's funeral was broadcast on 12 December 2022, with past and present characters paying their respects to the character. On 17 April 2025, archival audio of Dot was used to tie in with the exit of her step-granddaughter Sonia Fowler (Natalie Cassidy).

A recurring storyline in the serial was Dot's continuous forgiveness of her son's villainous crimes. Initially married at the start of the series to conman Charlie Cotton (Christopher Hancock), Dot married again in 2002 to pensioner Jim Branning (John Bardon) and the union proved to be popular with fans. Brown and Bardon won awards for their on-screen partnership. On 31 January 2008, Dot became the first character ever to appear in a monologue episode of a British soap opera, "Pretty Baby....". The acclaimed episode saw Dot reminiscing about her years of loss and grief into a tape recorder as a message to her ailing husband Jim. Dot was used to explore topical and controversial issues such as euthanasia, cancer, immigration, and homophobia.

Dot was generally well received by critics: she has been referred to as a cultural archetype and Brown won multiple awards for her portrayal. However, aspects of the character, such as her smoking and her religious beliefs, have been criticised, with religious groups suggesting Dot's faith is used in a pejorative manner. The character has also made an impact on popular culture; she has been spoofed, most notably by Alistair McGowan, and has been credited as inspiration for catwalk collections.

== Creation ==
Although Dot had been referred to since the very early episodes of the programme as the mother of villain Nick Cotton (John Altman), she did not actually appear on-screen until episode 40 in July 1985. Dot was conceptualised by show creators, Tony Holland and Julia Smith, along with the other original characters. Introduced as the "bible thumping arch-gossip" of the launderette, Dot was a character who bridged the generations. The actress June Brown was given the role after being recommended by actor Leslie Grantham, who played original character, Den Watts.

Brown was offered the part of Dot Cotton for a period of three months initially and in her own words, she was brought in "merely to be Nick Cotton's mother because Nick was coming back again". Brown has told Decca Aitkenhead of The Guardian in 2009 that she was wary of joining a soap opera as she had seen EastEnders once on television, "and there was an argument going on, and I thought, 'Oh, I don't want to watch all that,' so I switched it off. I didn't watch it again until I was asked to be in it." The role was extended and the character has become one of the longest-running to have featured in EastEnders.

=== Becoming Dot; characterisation ===
==== Appearance ====
Dot as she appeared in July 1985. The image shows Dot's traditional "Italian Boy" hairstyle, a key characteristic of the character's appearance. During the early years of the programme, June Brown's hair was styled to create the look; however, Brown later started using a wig for Dot's hair.

To become the character of Dot Cotton, Brown is required to wear a wig to replicate Dot's 1950s "Italian Boy" hairstyle that has remained in a largely unchanged style since she first appeared in 1985. Originally, the hair sported by Dot actually belonged to the actress, but Brown later started wearing a wig. Brown has stated that as soon as Dot's hairpiece is on, she becomes the character. The unchanged style of Dot was deemed so important by the programme makers, that when Brown requested to have dental work carried out to improve her prominent front teeth, the producers refused to allow it, arguing that Dot could not afford expensive tooth capping. Brown was not permitted to alter her teeth until early 1991 when they became loose. Brown has indicated that she does not want Dot's style altered. She claimed in 2002 that Dot had the same coats in her wardrobe that she was given in 1985. The fur-collared coat Dot wears for special occasions was donated by the character Angie Watts (Anita Dobson) in 1988 when she left the serial. Brown commented, "I like the older clothes [...] I don't want new clothes, I'm happy the way she is. She thinks she looks really smart. She's got a terrible opinion of herself that woman!"

==== Personality and religion ====
Brown has said that when she was cast as Dot, she was given a list of illnesses the character had. She added, "It meant she was a hypercondriac [sic] because she had nobody to care about her. She was quite a selfish woman [initially]." Dot has been described by author Hilary Kingsley as a "born victim." She adds that "with each blow that life delivers [Dot] bobs back up again, almost asking for more trouble, more pain, more suffering." Dot is renowned for being a hypochondriac, her Christian faith and quoting from the Bible. She has been described by Rupert Smith, author of 20 Years in Albert Square, as "God-bothering" and self-righteous. According to Kingsley, "nothing shakes Dot's view that the world is good because the creator made it so. Her faith sustains her through the most appalling ordeals." The character once expressed part of the reason for her faith on-screen in 2000, commenting to a vicar, "I couldn't manage without my faith, not with the life I've had"; former executive producer of EastEnders, John Yorke, has stated that this is his favourite line of EastEnders' entire existence. Author Antony Slide has noted that Dot's religious beliefs have given her solace, but has given her an excuse to be prejudiced against her neighbours, and to deal with the criminal antics of her wayward son. He described her as a "simpleminded woman whom one loved to hate".

In Kathryn and Phillip Dodd's published essay, From EastEnd to EastEnders, Dot has been used as an example of the media's representation of the working-class as community-orientated, but defensive: "evangelist-cum-launderette supervisor. Eagle-eyed, she patrols the Square, confronting evil and despair and asking those stricken with doubt to trust God, while simultaneously organizing the local Neighbourhood Watch scheme."

The character has taken on a matriarchal role in the absence of her own family, taking on the burdens of numerous waifs and strays throughout the show's history, including Donna Ludlow (Matilda Ziegler), Rod Norman (Christopher McHallem), Disa O'Brien (Jan Graveson), Nigel Bates (Paul Bradley) and Clare Bates (Gemma Bissix). Author Christine Geraghty asserts that Dot's role in the mothering structure of the serial has been confirmed.

Describing Dot, Brown has said, "I love playing her – she's a strong character. Dear old Dot, she's got strong moral views and odd religious beliefs, but her heart's in the right place. She has that awful worried expression on her face the whole time". Brown has noted the changes within Dot since the show's inception, saying that initially Dot was sharp and selfish, but since her character remarried in 2002, she has gained security and has "no reason to have the hypochondria she had in the past [...] She's become more caring over the years. She enjoys the company of young people. She loves her church. She can get in an anxious state – I like it when Dot's hysterical! She's also amusing, mostly because she doesn't realise she is".

==== Comedic role ====
As well as being tragic, Dot is scripted as a comic character. Brown has discussed the humour she incorporates into her performances: "I think Dot would be awfully boring if she weren't a bit comic [...] I always thought I had to put an edge on it, an edge of comedy, which just means doing it more seriously than you would do. If you want to play comedy then you have to be very intense about it [...] very, very serious." Some of Dot's catchphrases are used for humour, such as "Ooh I say!", uttered when she is "stuck for words". In 2004, Brown discussed the origin of the saying: "It was written once in the script and I quite enjoyed it, so I used to say it occasionally when it wasn't in the scripts. It was useful because it could be said in all different ways. Dot's very straight-laced, so it helped to express her horror at what went on." Brown revealed in 2008 that she has tried to cut down the use of this, along with the mispronunciation of her employer, Mr Papadopolous, as she has become a little embarrassed by them now they are so known. Mr. Papadopolous is the owner of the launderette where Dot works. In a long-running joke, Dot has difficulty pronouncing his surname, and for much of the show's history he has been referred to as Mr. Oppodopolus, Oppydoppy, or varying other mispronunciations. Brown has said she enjoys playing the comical aspects of Dot, stating, "She's not dreadfully funny but she's amusing and I like that because it lightens it up a bit."

==== Smoking ====
Smoking menthol cigarettes has become synonymous with Dot, and Brown has suggested that the habit is "intrinsic" to the character. Dot's smoking was criticised by private healthcare company Bupa in 2008, when they rated her television's most unhealthy character. They suggest that, in order to spread a public message, Dot should appear breathless, not with "implausibly good health". They added, "Though Dot Cotton has a smoker's voice – deeper than you might expect, she does not seem to be short of breath or wheezy" and that viewers would be influenced by this. However, Dot's smoking has been described by broadcasting watchdogs Ofcom as "justified in the context of the programme as a representation of an East End character" and they therefore stipulate that enforcement of broadcast smoking-sanctions would be unlikely on EastEnders.

== Development ==
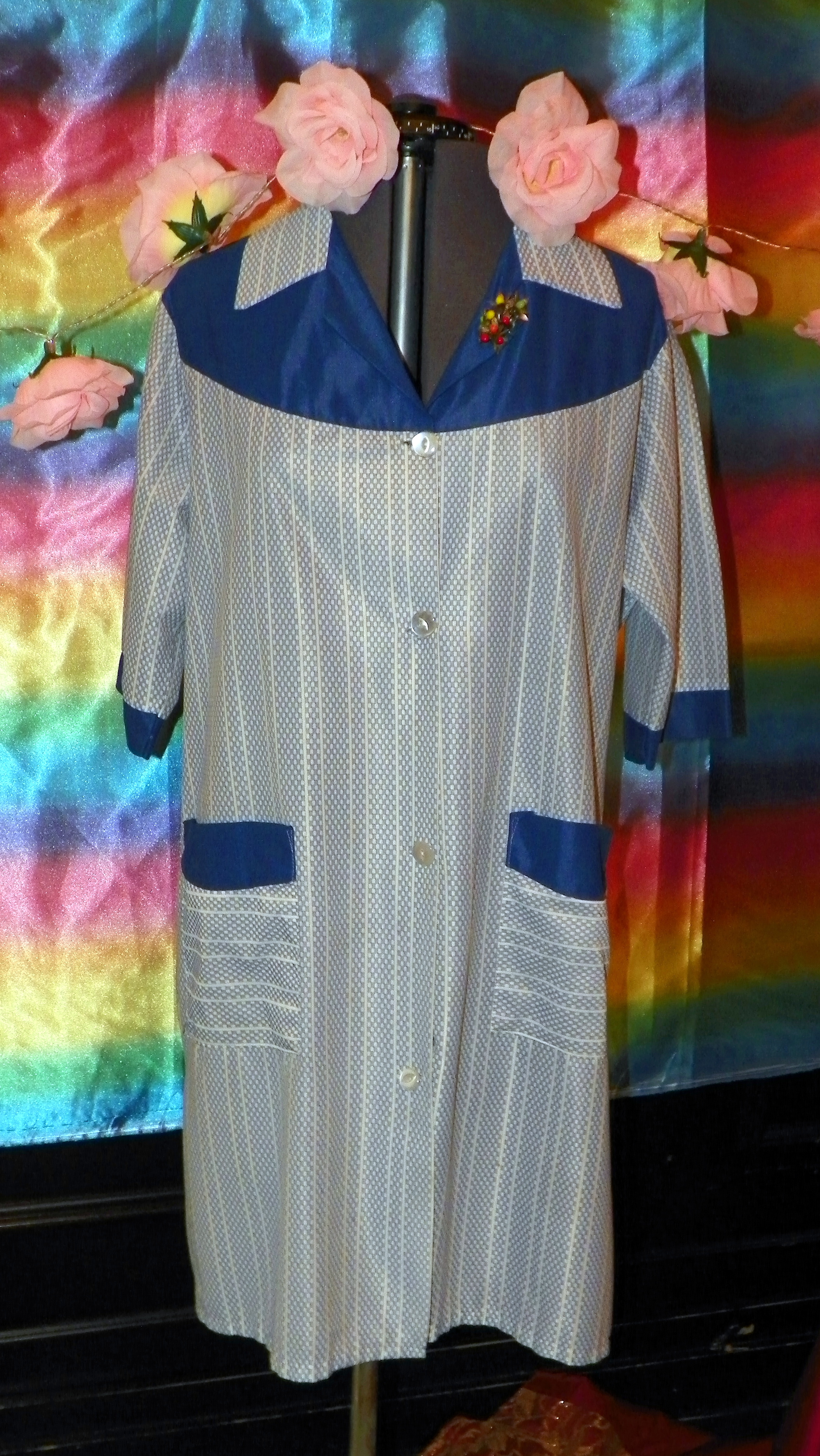
Dot's launderette uniform

=== The gossip ===
Upon her arrival, Dot Cotton was quickly established as the gossip, whose purpose, as author Anthony Slide sees it, was "that of a Greek chorus, commenting on the foibles of her fellow residents of Albert Square, from her vantage point as manager of the local launderette". The "gossip" is a soap opera role that author Christine Geraghty has described as "crucial to the audience's engagement with a serial and provides both a source of information and a means of speculation for the viewer." She asserts that a fundamental aspect of British soap is the idea of supporting members of community, based on the sharing of intimate knowledge, allowing "practical and emotional needs to be met" within the enclosed community. However, according to Geraghty, there is nevertheless "an unease about the price paid for such support and an acknowledgement of the fine-line between neighbourliness and nosiness. The 'gossip' personifies this unease and though her task of passing on information and ferreting out problems is crucial to the community, she [...] is frequently the butt of mockery and criticism [...] The avidity with which Dot Cotton seeks out news is the subject of some embarrassment to her more restrained neighbours but the exchange of information she provides is essential if the community is to provide support to its members [...] the very process of exchanging information makes her an essential yet mistrusted figure."

Indeed, it has been noted that, throughout the soap's early years, Dot was portrayed as a "lovable bigot", prejudiced against her neighbours and only happy when others were not. During the 1980s, Dot was shown to exhibit both racism and homophobia to members of the Walford community. In 1987, Dot was shown to respond negatively to Colin Russell (Michael Cashman) upon learning he was gay, reacting in "horror and ignorant self-righteousness" and spreading rumours that Colin had AIDS. According to Gary Loach from GaydarNation, Dot was being used by the programme makers to expose the bigotry of the "moral majority" in the real world following a public and media backlash over EastEnders' screening of its first homosexual kiss. However, while Dot has portrayed bigotry, author Anthony Slide has noted that the character can typically be "relied upon to drop her prejudices – she learned to accept both blacks and homosexuals in Albert Square."

Despite Dot's remaining penchant for gossip, it has been noted by Cole Moreton of The Independent in 2008 that the character has "evolved from a nasty gossip into a strong character for whom viewers feel warmth". Author Dorothy Hobson has discussed this in her book Soap Opera, suggesting that Dot, while providing a narrative function as a gossip, has in turn been the subject of other people's gossip, with her own problems, troubles and vulnerability.

=== Notable relationships ===
==== Nick ====
Dot's relationship with her wayward son Nick (John Altman), has been a feature of the character's narrative since her inception. Unlike Dot, Nick is scripted as a semi-regular character, one who comes and goes sporadically and, as authors Jill Marshall and Angela Werndly have observed, "we know heartache is in store for Dot Cotton every time her son, 'Nasty Nick', turns up [...] The recurrence of generic elements means we derive pleasure from expectation and prediction."

Executive producer Diederick Santer has discussed the "wonderfully dysfunctional mother-son relationship" Nick shares with Dot and her perpetual willingness to give Nick another chance regardless of his history of wrongdoing. Santer explained: "There's that thing where you sort of dare to hope that someone's changed, which is really tragic. They've let you down a hundred times, and yet you still hope that the hundred and first time they'll have changed." Actor Leslie Grantham has stated that Dot is the "one friend in [Nick's] life", while series story producer Dominic Treadwell-Collins has affirmed: "Dot's always going to forgive him. And that's the beauty of Nick and Dot." Concurring with this sentiment, John Altman (Nick) agreed: "No matter what he does, she'll forgive him. So did a lot of gangsters' mothers throughout history. Probably Al Capone's mother thought he was a sweet lad, you know."

One of Nick's most notable returns to the series occurred in 1990. Nick returned to his mother's life with the claim that he was a born-again Christian, which happened to coincide with her £10,000 win on the bingo. EastEnders writer Sarah Phelps explained: "For Dot, the idea that Jesus had finally spoken to Nick, that was all her Christmases coming at once! Nick knew that. It was sort of obvious that Nick could be saying 'Jesus walks with me' and then just go out and kick somebody or nick their wallet." With the help of a fake priest, Nick managed to convince his mother of his new-found faith and then began a slow campaign to control her eating habits and poison her in order to claim her money. Discussing the storyline, scriptwriter Colin Brake has indicated that at first it was not clear to the audience whether Nick had reformed or not, but as the weeks passed it became obvious that he did intend to kill his mother, as he was shown practising a fake suicide note in Dot's handwriting – a foil to cover the intended murder; according to Brake, Dot remained blithely and perhaps purposefully ignorant to his wrongdoing. The episode which culminated the storyline, written by P.J. Hammond, was set solely in Dot's house and featured an unusually small cast consisting of Nick, Dot, Nick's estranged father Charlie (Christopher Hancock), Dot's close friend Ethel Skinner (Gretchen Franklin) and Alistair the fake priest. At the last moment, in what Altman has called the "one time we saw a glimmer of Nick's good side", Nick backed out of his plan and stopped Dot from eating the poisoned meal he had intended to kill her with. Once again Dot was left alone, broken-hearted at what her own son had been prepared to do to her.

Other storylines have concentrated on Dot's various attempts to reform Nick, such as in 1991, when Nick returned with a heroin addiction. As the plot unfolded, Dot tried to curtail Nick's addiction by locking him in his room and forcing him to go cold turkey. His resulting paranoia and cravings led him to escape and murder the first person he encountered, The Queen Victoria landlord Eddie Royle (Michael Melia). The episode where Eddie was murdered was the big autumn launch episode for 1991. Nick stood trial in January 1993; however, "he got away with murder" for a second time in the serial. Other scams have included Nick's attempt to con Dot by claiming he had AIDS in 1998 after escaping from prison, which ultimately led to Dot having him re-imprisoned. Then followed a plot that saw him largely responsible for the death of his son Ashley (Frankie Fitzgerald) in June 2001, ultimately leading Dot to disown Nick and prompting to leave the Square again. He is not seen for more than seven years after this, although he was mentioned in 2006 when recovering from cancer off-screen.

Following pleas from Brown to resurrect Nick, John Altman returned to the serial again in December 2008, in a storyline that saw Nick attempt to con Dot again, this time aided by a previously unheard of daughter, Dotty (Molly Conlin), who was born in 2002 after Nick's previous exit. Altman explained: "Nick needed something, because I think if he didn't have little Dotty, for him to walk through that door, she would just have treated him as a complete outcast." As the storyline progressed, it was revealed that Nick and Dotty had intentions to kill Dot for her inheritance; they concocted a plan to make her think she had developed dementia then overdose her with sleeping pills, which fails when Dotty has a change of heart and Nick flees once again after causing an explosion and being disowned by Dot.

In March 2014, Dot is told by the police that Nick has died of respiratory failure from a heroin overdose the previous week. One of the police officers who breaks the news to Dot is Nick's son Charlie Cotton (Declan Bennett) although it is later revealed that he is impersonating a police officer. Charlie explains that he was conceived from a brief marriage Nick had with his mother Yvonne (Pauline McLynn). During the funeral, Charlie and undertaker Les Coker (Roger Sloman) prevent Dot from looking in the coffin. Dot is suspicious and invites Yvonne to tell the truth and she assures Dot that Charlie is her grandson. A few weeks later, Dot's stepdaughter Carol Jackson (Lindsey Coulson) asks Charlie for advice, when he leaves his phone at her house, she answers a call and discovers that Nick is still alive.

Nick reappears in Albert Square seven months after his faked death. Charlie's fiancée Ronnie Mitchell (Samantha Womack) takes an instant dislike to him and tries to bribe him to leave, but Nick returns for Charlie and Ronnie's wedding. Nick decides to get revenge on Ronnie and cuts the brakes of her car. After the wedding, Charlie, Ronnie and her sister Roxy (Rita Simons) are involved in a car accident which hits and later kills Emma Summerhayes (Anna Acton), while Ronnie ends up in a coma but survives. Yvonne discovers that Nick cut the brakes of the car. Yvonne tells Charlie but he does not believe her until he catches Nick with some of the money Ronnie used to bribe him. Then Nick implicates Yvonne in Ronnie's accident, so Charlie asks them both to leave. Dot hides Nick next door and obtains heroin for Nick. Later she finds him unconscious, Nick regains consciousness briefly but later dies in Dot's arms, in the same location that Reg Cox was discovered 30 years earlier.

==== Charlie ====
Like Nick, Dot's first screen husband, Charlie Cotton (Christopher Hancock), was also a semi-regular character who came and went throughout his duration in the show. Depicted as bigamous and a conman, Charlie typically would reappear in the show whenever he needed money or temporary accommodation and, because of Dot's Christian ideals regarding forgiveness, Charlie would always be permitted to return. According to Christopher Hancock, Charlie was "a truly revolting character, a loser."

Producers decided to kill Charlie off in 1991; Charlie died off-screen when crashing his lorry on a motorway. The decision to kill Charlie was taken in order to reintroduce Charlie's son, Nick. Nick had been involved in a storyline that saw him attempt to poison Dot in 1990, and producers felt that in order for Dot to allow Nick back into her life again, something major had to occur in her narrative, that being the death of her husband. Storyline editor, Andrew Holden, has discussed this in the EastEnders Handbook publication in 1991: "We wanted to bring Nick Cotton back and we also wanted to push Dot forward and change her life. But the problem was how? The last time we saw Nick he was attempting to kill his mother. Dot isn't a fool so we knew getting them back together was like a three card trick. How do we get out of this? So we made [Nick] a heroin addict. That made him vulnerable, in a mess and needing his mother to get money for him. We then had to kill Charlie because I figured that only in a state of shock and uncertainty about her belief in God would Dot contemplate forgiving Nick and attempting to reform him. She decides to believe that she can make a decent human being of Nick. She feels it's her last chance. As a widow Dot enters new territory. Dot's snobbery is based on ludicrous misconceptions, one of which is that she is better than [her friend] Ethel because she has a husband. She is going to have a lot of scope [...] Dot's life is going to change." Brown was opposed to the killing of Charlie and she attempted to get the programme-makers to change their minds. She comments, "I was very unhappy to learn that Charlie would be killed off. I would have preferred if they'd left the door open for him to possibly return one day. I went to see the writers and put this forward. I suggested that there could be some uncertainty about the body. Charlie may have picked up a hitch-hiker and he was the one who died. John Altman, who plays Nick, was also sorry about Charlie. We weren't thinking just about Christopher Hancock, who played Charlie so well, it was that we liked the character and it seemed a waste. But I was too late, I couldn't change their minds. In the past, I have talked things through and I was listened to".

Charlie's funeral episode, written by Linda Dearsley, was aired on 11 July 1991, and was dominated by Dot's reaction to Charlie's death and her trip to identify his body. It is selected by writer Colin Brake as one of 1991's episodes of the year.

==== Jim ====
Jim proposes to Dot, 21 December 2001. The scenes were filmed on-location in one of the carriages on the Millennium Eye in central London away from the soap's typical set. The coat worn by Dot here was given to her in the soap by Angie Watts in the 1980s, and Brown has suggested that it's a rarely used part of her costume which only appears on very special occasions.

Dot's second significant romance was built upon by scriptwriters in 2000 on the behest of producer John Yorke. Dot was paired romantically with pensioner Jim Branning, played by John Bardon and a slow courtship was featured, with Dot often shown to be outraged by Jim's advances, resulting in numerous rejections. Dot finally succumbed and accepted his marriage proposal in an episode that aired in December 2001; the scenes were filmed inside one of the carriages of the London Eye on the South Bank of the River Thames. Their wedding aired on 14 February 2002, Valentine's Day. The Guardian critic, Nancy Banks-Smith, described the wedding as "uniquely uneventful [...] For Dot and Jim 'In sickness and health... till death do us part' seemed to carry more resonance than for most."

Bardon has revealed that both he and Brown were sceptical about their characters marrying. In an interview with American fan-based newspaper, Walford Gazette, he commented, "No way did the pair of us want to get married because we thought if we got married, we'd sit indoors and watch the telly every night. As it happened, we've had some nice things to do. And we are married, and it's worked out all right." Brown has reiterated that she feared Dot would become boring if she married Jim, but that producers persuaded her that the marriage might be a good thing. On-screen, Dot had just suffered the death of her grandson Ashley (in which Nick had played a part), and Brown felt that a traumatic event like that would have changed her character. In her opinion, the only way Dot would have got over Ashley's death "would be to have someone else to care for and when it happened there was nobody [but] with marrying Jim she gets a family – that's what persuaded me. That house will become a house again – it will have a central point, they will be able to use the house as a central point, as Dot will be there."

Critic Grace Dent has likened Dot and Jim to Coronation Street's Hilda and Stan Ogden, comparing a scene in EastEnders where Dot nags Jim and he prays for a quiet life to a similar one from Coronation Street, that aired decades before. Brown discussed Dot's relationship with Jim in 2004: "Initially, Jim wasn't the sort of person that Dot approved of. He drank, he gambled, he lied – he wasn't reliable at all. But Jim decided that he quite fancied Dot – heaven knows why! I think that you always have to work out for yourself how you can make the character work in a new situation. I could see that Jim was kind to Dot [...] His kindness drew her towards him. [...] Dot's definitely in control of Jim. She quite enjoys bossing him around." Brown stated that she enjoys her screen partnership with John Bardon, saying "We work very well together – he's got great timing and he can be very tender too."

The on-screen relationship between Dot and Jim was halted in 2007 when Jim was hastily written out of the soap due to John Bardon suffering a major stroke. In the script Jim suffered a stroke and was placed in the care of off-screen relatives. Dot and Jim remained together, with Jim making sporadic appearances between 2008 and 2009 to visit Dot. A more permanent return for the character was announced in 2009. However, it was reported in April 2011 that Bardon had filmed his exit from the series, and that the show's staff believed it marked the end of the character. A source told the Daily Mirror: "Dot's been struggling for a while and realises that she can no longer give Jim the care and attention he deserves and is forced to make the heartbreaking decision that he should move into a home. [...] It was very emotional on the set for the scenes where Dot discusses her decision and talks to Jim about him going into care for good. There were a lot of tears. [...] The feeling is that this is the end of Jim as a character because he won't leave the home and won't ever be a regular in Albert Square again." It was reported that Jim could still appear in the care home if Bardon's health permitted it, although ultimately this did not happen, as Bardon never recovered enough to make any further appearances. Jim left the show on 26 May 2011. Brown opined that Dot would feel lonely without Jim, saying, "I think she'll be very lonely and feel she doesn't have much purpose in life. It was really important to tell this story because there are so many people in a similar situation to Dot. It was moving to act out, too — not just because of Dot and Jim's relationship, but because I'm really good friends with John Bardon in real life." Jim died off-screen four years later, shortly after the death of actor John Bardon.

==== Rose ====
In May 2011, it was reported that Dot's estranged half-sister Rose would join the series, played by Polly Perkins. Reports stated that the sisters fell out when Rose had an affair with Dot's husband Charlie, but after suffering a bout of hypochondria, Dot would decide to track Rose down, feeling it is time to put things right, but Rose will not be pleased to see Dot again after so many years.

==== Friendships ====
An enduring friendship featured in EastEnders was the one shared between the characters Dot Cotton and Ethel Skinner (played by Gretchen Franklin), first shown on-screen in 1985 and ending with Ethel's death in 2000, though the characters shared a backstory set prior to 1985 and were scripted as neighbours who grew old together in East London, along with Lou Beale (Anna Wing). BBC News has described Dot and Ethel as an "incomparable double-act [...] Occasionally spiky and often hilarious". Dot and Ethel shared few similarities in personality. During an episode that aired in 2008, just under 8 years after Ethel died in the serial, Dot discussed the differences between them: "Ethel was a free spirit, not like me. All bottled up. I remember sitting on the step of the Vic, waiting for me mother. I caught a glimpse of her through the door. Sitting on top of the piano, her legs spread, showing next week's washing and bawling out "Roll Out the Barrel". Just like a navvy. She didn't seem to have a care in the world. I had enough for both of us. I loved Ethel." Critic for The Guardian, Nancy Banks-Smith, discussed the characters' relationship in 2008, comparing them to the girls written about by Dylan Thomas: "There was always one pretty and pert [Ethel], and always one in glasses [Dot]." Banks-Smith adds that theirs was "a symbiotic relationship in which the pretty one looks even prettier by contrast and the plain one is popular by proxy. Which is not to say it is not a real and enduring friendship."

Their bickering and personality differences were often used for comic effect; however, in episode 248 of the show, scriptwriter Colin Brake notes that viewers were shown a different side to Ethel and Dot's friendship in the soaps second two-hander episode. The episode aired in July 1987 and featured just the two old ladies. Brake has described the episode as a "mini-play about nostalgia and growing old", adding that "some viewers found it too unusual, but many others were charmed by the change of pace". According to Brake, the episode gave Franklin and Brown the opportunity to show the sadness behind the often comical characters of Ethel and Dot. The episode was written by Charlie Humphreys and directed by Mike Gibbon, a future producer of the show. Author Christine Geraghty has used the episode as an example of the fact that "female conversation is the backbone to traditional soap".

Author Dorothy Hobson has discussed the use of older female characters in British soap opera as a means of providing comedy. She compares Ethel and Dot's function in EastEnders to the trio of Ena Sharples, Minnie Caldwell and Martha Longhurst from Coronation Street with regard to providing humour. She has noted that following Ethel's retirement from the serial, the production team at EastEnders attempted to replicate Dot and Ethel's friendship by introducing a number of "'friends' to fulfill the same function of a female friend for Dot and the series." An example of this was the character Lilly Mattock (Barbara Keogh) who appeared between 1998 and 1999. The author goes on to note that Ethel's role in Dot's narrative was difficult to replace because "far from being complete stereotypes, their relationships depend on them being long-standing friends with the ability to share stories and reminisce. For the characters to 'work', there is a need for unspoken intimacy and a shared knowledge for each other's lives. They carry the internal knowledge of the narratives and share that knowledge with the audience." Brown has spoken about the "wonderful rapport" she had with Gretchen Franklin who played Ethel. She added, "I do miss Ethel, it was great with Dot and Ethel. They did try and stop us working together at one time, but the producer changed and it all went back to where it started."

Throughout her time in EastEnders, many of Dot's scenes have been set in Walford's launderette, where the character has worked as an assistant for almost the entire duration of her time in EastEnders. Here, Dot was frequently featured with another long-running protagonist, fellow launderette colleague, Pauline Fowler, played by Wendy Richard from 1985 to 2006. Author Christine Geraghty has discussed the working environment the women inhabited, indicating that because the owner of the launderette is barely present, the "working relationship hinges on the friendships (or otherwise) of the women who work in it". As with Ethel, Dot and Pauline's friendship was often used for comedic purposes; emphasis was placed on their differences, leading to numerous petty squabbles and in 2004 saw them "buried alive" underneath a collapsed fairground ride, in the midst of a cake-selling war. However, Pauline and Dot were most frequently shown gossiping, reminiscing about the past, or sharing their woes in the launderette. The duo has been described by television personality Paul O'Grady as a "fabulous double-act": "Dot's probably Pauline's one and only confidant. Pauline eventually will break down and tell Dot things that she'd never tell anybody else." On the episode marking the screen death of Pauline on 25 December 2006, Dot remarks to Pauline, "You're the only real friend I've got", in a scene that Tim Teeman of The Times has described as "one of the most moving scenes in a soap [in 2006]".

=== 1993 exit and 1997 return ===
In 1993, Brown decided to quit EastEnders after becoming "discontented" with the way Dot was portrayed. The character departed on-screen in August 1993, when Dot moved away from the soap's setting to live with her son Nick and his family in Gravesend. Of her departure, Brown told Donna Hay from What's on TV that "I love her, she appealed to me because she was so funny. If she'd been straight, she would have been boring to play. Instead she took her problems too seriously and dramatised everything." In 1997 she revealed to the Daily Mirror: "I always felt Dot was one of those characters who should stay the same. She's a simple creature. There are some people who the same things happen to them again and again. They never learn [...] When I left, there was all that rubbish about it getting too much for me [but] I stopped because I wasn't being used very much. I thought, 'It's a part-time job'. It wasn't being written properly. Instead of finding the gossip and passing it on, [Dot was hearing the gossip from others]. [Dot] was living on a reputation. [viewers] said to me, 'I loved it when [Dot] had [...] varicose veins.' I thought: 'What?! That was in 1985, it's 1993!'. I was getting so tetchy, so I thought I'd go. I'd had enough. They were a bit shocked, because apparently there were some good stories coming up." Expanding on this in 2008, Brown stated that she "didn't like what they were doing with Dot – she was meant to spread the gossip. Originally she was a fountain of knowledge then next thing I know, people are telling Dot what had been happening and I thought, 'No, this just won't do'. I was very annoyed, I felt like they had completely changed my character."

In October 1996, newspapers reported that BBC bosses had approached Brown about reprising her role as Dot Cotton and, according to the Daily Mirror, Brown had been in negotiations with EastEnders for several months prior. Brown is quoted by the paper as saying, "I have always been reluctant to go back because I thought Dot's character was not being portrayed properly. I thought it had faded. I always said if Dot comes back it must be as Dot." Brown secured a deal to return and began filming on-location in Gravesend in February 1997. The episode saw Dot's former lodger, Nigel Bates (Paul Bradley), visiting Dot to discover that Nick was once again in prison, leaving Dot alone. Her return episode aired in April 1997. Brown has since revealed that she opted to return to EastEnders to raise her profile again. She had originally only intended to return for a 3-month stint, but was persuaded to stay when a project she had been working on was cancelled. In July 1997, she commented, "I've decided to stay in EastEnders. They asked me, and in the end I thought: 'Oh well, I might as well.' Everyone, including Barbara Windsor, Wendy Richard and Adam Woodyatt, was saying: 'Don't leave'. And people were coming up in the street saying: 'It's lovely to have you back.' Anyway, I find playing the old dear quite fun." After a 5-month break, following Dot being held hostage in her flat by the escaped convict friend of her son, Brown returned to filming in October 1997 on a permanent contract.

=== Issues ===
==== Euthanasia ====
In 2000, Dot was featured in a storyline about euthanasia, when her oldest friend Ethel, who had terminal cancer, asked her to help her die. The storyline allowed the production team to present all sides of the debate about euthanasia, from the perspective of the sufferer and from the person who is asked to assist in the mercy killing, religious and moral opposition. According to author Dorothy Hobson, "Dot suffered torment as she struggled with her conscience and she tried to resist the request [...] to assist [Ethel] in the ultimate sin". In the storyline, Ethel enjoyed the last days of her life and chose her final evening. Assisted by Dot, she took an overdose of her medication and died. Written by Simon Ashton and directed by Francesca Joseph the episode ended with a scene in which Ethel tells a weeping Dot "you're the best friend I ever had". Alternative credit music replaced the typical drum beats and theme tune at the end of the episode. The 1931 song used instead of the usual theme was "Guilty" by Al Bowlly. Ben Summerskill from The Observer has suggested that Dot's part in the euthanasia storyline was "one of the most moving dramatic sequences shown in recent years on British TV". The episode was voted the most emotional soap death in a Radio Times poll of 4,000 readers in 2006.

The repercussions of the euthanasia for Dot's character have been described as "extremely serious" as she suffered from "untold guilt and felt that she needed to be punished for the action." The Executive Producer overseeing this storyline, John Yorke, has discussed the storyline in a speech given at the Bishops' Conference for clergy and other ministers in the Diocese of St Albans: "Dot, as a good Christian, refused to help, until her love for her friend overcame her own fear of damnation. Riddled with an intolerable burden of guilt, she felt there was only one person she could talk to [Jesus] The Dot and Ethel storyline played out in over four months with many similar scenes, to an average audience of 16 million viewers. Dot [...] explored the full panoply of religious belief before coming back to terms with her maker. When Alan Bookbinder took over as head of religious broadcasting at the BBC he described EastEnders for the weeks the Dot and Ethel story ran as 'the best religious programme on television' and compared [it] to Graham Greene. While we felt a little uncomfortable in such exalted company, what it did show is that handled properly an audience is able to engage in, and relate to profound ethical debate."

Deborah Annetts, CEO of the Voluntary Euthanasia Society (VES), has praised the storyline. In 2004 she commented, "It was a sympathetic portrayal. It demonstrated to a lot of people their own experiences. Lots of us have had conversations with someone, particularly our mothers and fathers, where they have said to us: 'If I get really ill, you will end it, won't you?' The Dot/Ethel storyline showed just what that conversation can entail and what happens to the other person after – the guilt and pain they have to live with."

Such was the controversy surrounding this storyline that the University of Glamorgan uses the plot as part of their new approach to the study of British criminal law. Part of the law foundation course involves studying the soap opera and giving students the chance to decide if Dot Cotton's character is guilty of murder. The storyline is also featured in GCSE Religious Studies textbooks. In 2008, All About Soap included Ethel's euthanasia in their list of "top ten taboo" storylines of all time. They described it as one of the "taboos which have bravely been broken by soaps."

==== Kidney cancer ====
In a 2004 plot, Dot was diagnosed with kidney cancer. The programme makers sought advice from health care professionals when devising the storyline, including specialist information nurses from CancerBACUP. Nurse Martin Ledwick said, "We drew on our experience of talking to the thousands of people who call our helpline, to help advise the EastEnders scriptwriters. Many people react to a cancer diagnosis as Dot does in the BBC serial – with confusion and fear. We also speak to family and friends affected by the illness and those living with continuing uncertainty. EastEnders explores all these issues, and hopefully will help improve people's understanding of what it's like to be affected by a cancer diagnosis."

According to Macmillan Cancer Support, "Dot's experience [increased] people's understanding of the emotional impact of a cancer diagnosis; how the illness affects family and friends; and what it's like to live with uncertainty. It also [helped] to raise awareness of a comparatively rare cancer and the fact that cancer is a disease most often affecting older people."

Brown herself has confessed that she was unhappy with the storyline as she felt playing illness was not productive at her age. Discussing Dot's reluctance to reveal her illness to anyone, Brown said "[it's] ironic because I've played her as a hypochondriac, longing for attention, for 20 years. Now something's wrong, she doesn't want anyone to know."

==== Abandoned baby ====
In the Easter 2007 episode, Dot takes an abandoned baby she finds in a church. This was filmed in Kent at Stansted, St. Giles Church in Wormshill, The Ringlestone Inn near Harrietsham and Court Lodge Farm. After being contacted by the child's Ukrainian mother Anya, Dot offers to care for both of them, however Jim turns Anya in to the authorities for being an illegal immigrant. Roz Laws of the Sunday Mercury questioned the plausibility of the storyline, observing: "Babies aren't abandoned in the real world very often. But you can barely cross [Albert] Square [...] without tripping over poor tots who their mothers don't want." Laws also felt that the speed at which the immigration department operated was "amazingly on-the-ball", when in reality many illegal immigrants "slip through the net".

=== Monologue ===
In January 2008, Dot became the first soap opera character to be featured in a monologue episode, known as a "single-hander". Written by Tony Jordan, the episode features Dot recording a message for Jim, who is in hospital recovering from a stroke. The episode is entitled "Pretty Baby....", named after the song of the same name by Tony Jackson, which replaced the drumbeats and EastEnders' theme tune that typically accompanies the end credits of episodes. Brown was nominated in the Best Actress category at the 2009 British Academy Television Awards for her performance in the episode, becoming the first soap actress nominated in the category since 1988, when Jean Alexander was shortlisted for her role as Hilda Ogden in Coronation Street.

=== 2020 departure and off-screen death ===
On 20 February 2020, it was reported that Dot's appearance on 21 January 2020 was her last and that Brown had announced that she would "never go back" when she told the Distinct Nostalgia podcast, "I don't want a retainer for EastEnders, I've left. I've left for good. I've sent her off to Ireland where she'll stay. I've left EastEnders." A BBC statement said: "We never discuss artists' contracts, however as far as EastEnders are concerned the door remains open for June, as it always has if the story arises and if June wishes to take part." It was also reported that Brown was due to attend a gathering of the cast and crew for the show's 35th anniversary in February 2020, that her dressing room was intact and that there were no plans, to the production team's knowledge, for Brown to leave the role permanently. Brown died in April 2022 without returning to the role of Dot.

In August 2022, it was announced that a storyline around Dot's death, including the character's funeral, would take place later in the year. The executive producer of EastEnders, Chris Clenshaw, stated: "Everyone at EastEnders was truly heartbroken when June passed away earlier this year and, for quite a while, no-one could even think about saying goodbye to Dot – an iconic character who will go down in television history and be cherished forever. June was always adamant that she never wanted Dot's time to end while she was still with us, but she also knew that EastEnders would rightly say their farewells to Dot when the time was right. Sadly, that time has come and we are determined to give the audience, who treasured Dot for so many years, the fitting tribute that she so deeply deserves." Dot died on 1 December 2022, and her funeral, complete with a glass hearse drawn by black horses, was broadcast on 12 December, somewhat "later than advertised" after being delayed by the Qatar football World Cup.

== Storylines ==
=== Backstory ===
Dot's backstory states that she was born in Walford and was evacuated to Wales as a child during World War II. Her guardians, Gwen (Eve Myles/Gwenllian Davies) and Will (Dafydd Emyr), wished to adopt her, but Dot returned to Walford after Will's death and spent the rest of her childhood helping her neglectful mother care for her younger half-siblings: Gerry, Tim and Rose (Polly Perkins). Aged 18, Dot married Charlie Cotton (Christopher Hancock). The following year, he forced her to have an abortion, threatening to leave her if she did not; in desperation, Dot approached Dr. Harold Legg (Leonard Fenton), who reluctantly performed the procedure by inducing birth. Dot bore a stillborn daughter, who she planned to name Gwen, presumably after the lady she lived with during the war. As she recovered from the stillborn, Dr Legg found Charlie in a pub and hit him for his callousness. Charlie soon left after Dot fell pregnant again, and as Dot was giving birth to their son Nick (John Altman), Charlie was having an affair with her sister, Rose, in Liverpool, whom he later bigamously married. She raised Nick alone, with Charlie making unannounced returns and departures sporadically, and although Dot doted on Nick, she was not an affectionate mother.

=== 1985–2020 ===
Dot is introduced as the gossiping, chain smoking, Christian friend of Ethel Skinner (Gretchen Franklin) and Lou Beale (Anna Wing) who works with Pauline Fowler (Wendy Richard) at the Walford launderette. After Nick is cleared of murder, his girlfriend Zoe Newton (Elizabeth Chadwick) arrives in Walford and introduces Dot to their nine-year-old son, Ashley Cotton (Rossi Higgins). Dot becomes close to Ashley and eventually Zoe asks her to move to Gravesend with them. Dot then leaves Albert Square.

Dot returns nearly four years later when Nigel Bates (Paul Bradley) tracks her down. She reveals that Nick has been arrested for drugs possession and that Zoe and Ashley have moved away. After being held hostage by a convict friend of Nick, she returns to the square and is shocked when Nick returns unexpectedly. He tries to steal her money by claiming he has AIDS and needs money to pay for illegally imported medication. Dot believes him but later discovers it is a lie and he is on the run from the police. She contacts the police and he is arrested.

Dot moves in with fellow senior citizen Lilly Mattock (Barbara Keogh) and is arrested for the illegal use of cannabis, which she confuses for herbal tea. When Lilly leaves after she is mugged, Dot moves in with Pauline. Her oldest friend Ethel also comes to stay with the Fowlers for a time, having become terminally ill. Ethel begs Dot to help her end her life. Torn between her Christian beliefs against euthanasia and her best friend's wishes, she helps Ethel to die, but later feels she should be jailed for murder. When the police do not believe her story, Dot demands retribution in another form and she ends up in court for shoplifting. She initially avoids a prison sentence but is imprisoned for 14 days for contempt of court following an outburst in the courtroom.

When Dot reappears on the square after serving her sentence, she learns that Nick has also been released from prison. She goes to stay with Pauline's son Mark Fowler (Todd Carty) for a while and encounters Ashley (now played by Frankie Fitzgerald) after he runs away from home. Eventually, Nick himself returns to the square and reunites with Dot – who is shocked to see her son once more. Initially sceptical over Nick's previous criminality, Dot is pleased to have her family around and moves out of the Fowler household to live with them. Mark, however, is unimpressed and the two end up clashing with each other on multiple occasions. Nick's feud with Mark leads him to cut the brakes on Mark's motorbike in an attempt to kill his rival. However, Ashley ends up crashing the motorbike at the launderette in front of his family and the Fowlers. Ashley is confirmed to have died and Dot is devastated. On the night before Ashley's funeral, Dot is horrified to learn that her son is responsible for Ashley's death upon overhearing Nick telling Mark about this during another confrontation between them. The following day, Ashley's funeral takes place and Dot disowns Nick, telling him that he is no longer her son, and he leaves Albert Square in disgrace.

Dot establishes a relationship with neighbour Jim Branning (John Bardon). He soon proposes to her, but she is overwhelmed and leaves Walford in response to this. Jim perseveres and when they go on the London Eye one Christmas Eve, he proposes again and she accepts. They decide that they will have a platonic marital relationship. Dot is diagnosed with kidney cancer and decides not to tell anyone except friend Dennis Rickman (Nigel Harman). She initially refuses treatment and plans to die quietly, but is eventually persuaded to undergo chemotherapy and makes a full recovery. Jim suffers a stroke, leaving him seriously ill. He is placed in a nursing home, but Dot struggles with this decision and tries at a later date to care for Jim at home. However, she finds being a full-time carer exhausting and lonely. Eventually, after Dot experiences ill-health brought on by stress, Jim moves back to a nursing home. Shortly after Jim leaves, Dot hears a doorbell ring and assumes that it is Jim has come back to collect his hat. She opens the door and is surprised to find Nick waiting outside. He claims that he has changed and is now a plumber. Dot believes Nick when he introduces her to his six-year-old daughter Dotty (Molly Conlin). Although Dot promptly bonds with Dotty, she is apprehensive towards Nick and learns that he is once again exploiting their reconciliation for her. She refuses to pay him, so Nick responds by telling his mother that she either relents or cannot see Dotty again, which makes her pay. It soon transpires that Nick is plotting to kill Dot for her life insurance and that Dotty is secretly involved with the plan. They work to convince Dot that she has symptoms of dementia, but their plan backfires when Dotty exposes the plot. Months later, Dotty is retrieved by her mother, Sandy Gibson (Caroline Pegg).

Dot receives a police visit informing her that Nick has died. One of the police officers returns later to tell her that he is actually her grandson Charlie (Declan Bennett), whose existence she never found out about. A devastated Dot holds a funeral for Nick and grows close to Charlie in the aftermath as he moves in with Dot. However, it is revealed that Charlie is not a policeman, but a caretaker who has helped Nick stage his own death to avoid being arrested following a robbery. Nick reappears in Walford to Dot's shock and persuades his mother to hide him at her house. Although horrified that Charlie and Nick lied to her, she forgives Charlie and agrees to aid Nick's escape from the UK, this time for good. Dot, unwilling to give up on her son, hides Nick in a derelict neighbouring house. Unable to leave the premises, Nick starts using heroin again but cannot feed his drug addiction and asks Dot to obtain drugs for him. Dot later finds Nick unconscious, having had a bad reaction to the drugs, and she realises that Nick is dying. Once he awakens, Nick accuses Dot of raising him wrong. Dot remains adamant to see the best in Nick until he confesses to the one crime he never told her about; the murder of her old friend Reg Cox (Johnnie Clayton), who was alleged to have died by accident nearly three decades ago. Horrified to have learned that it was Nick who killed Reg, Dot brands her son evil and slaps him when he insults her. Nick then endures another effect of his drugging and requests his mother to phone an ambulance. She does not phone for one, instead praying to let the circumstances decide whether Nick should live or die. As he takes his last breaths, Nick apologises to Dot for all the trouble he caused for her and asks her to forgive him; Dot tells Nick to seek Jesus for forgiveness and watches as Nick dies in front of her.

Dot confesses to the police and is charged with Nick's murder and subsequently imprisoned. Dot initially decides to plead guilty, believing she should atone for her sins in prison, but when Jim dies, she attends his funeral and realises how much her family needs her. She changes her plea and is cleared of murder at the court hearing; however, she is found guilty of manslaughter and sentenced to prison for 14 months. She is released four months later. Dot reveals that she thinks she is going blind to Patrick Trueman (Rudolph Walker); he books Dot a doctor's appointment and the doctor suspects age-related macular degeneration, which is later confirmed. Dot starts treatment but she is annoyed that her eyesight does not improve much. Dot is told that she is being let go from the launderette, which closes on Christmas Eve and everyone is too busy to visit her. She finds a Christmas mixtape recorded by her dead friend Heather Trott (Cheryl Fergison), and takes in a stray cat, which she eventually names Dave. She spends Christmas Day alone, but when Patrick realises, he invites her to the Queen Victoria public house and her neighbours present her with the gift of a washing machine.

Dot trips over Dave and falls awkwardly onto a chair. Nobody knows she is injured until her step-granddaughter, Sonia Fowler (Natalie Cassidy), finds her. Dot is then taken to hospital and Sonia blames her neighbours for not looking out for her. Dot is worried when the doctor tells her that she will need an operation on her hip but she refuses physiotherapy. Dot goes to stay with Dotty for three months, returning when she hears that Abi Branning (Lorna Fitzgerald) is brainstem dead after falling from a roof. Dot is surprised to see the launderette had reopened and Karen Taylor (Lorraine Stanley) is working there. After Dr Legg's death, she inherits his entire estate and goes away to visit her family. Dot returns with Dotty and she buys her council house with her inherited money. After Sonia cons her out of money, Martin Fowler (James Bye) takes the blame. She convinces Dot to visit Charlie again in Ireland and Dot leaves Sonia a message asking her to find out why Martin took the money and to let her know. Over a year later, Sonia receives news from Charlie that Dot has died peacefully in her sleep. The residents of Walford honour her in the Queen Vic where they toast her. Many Albert Square residents, past and present, gather at her funeral to pay their respects and share their memories of Dot whilst Sonia delivers a eulogy. She is then buried next to best friend Ethel.

== Reception ==
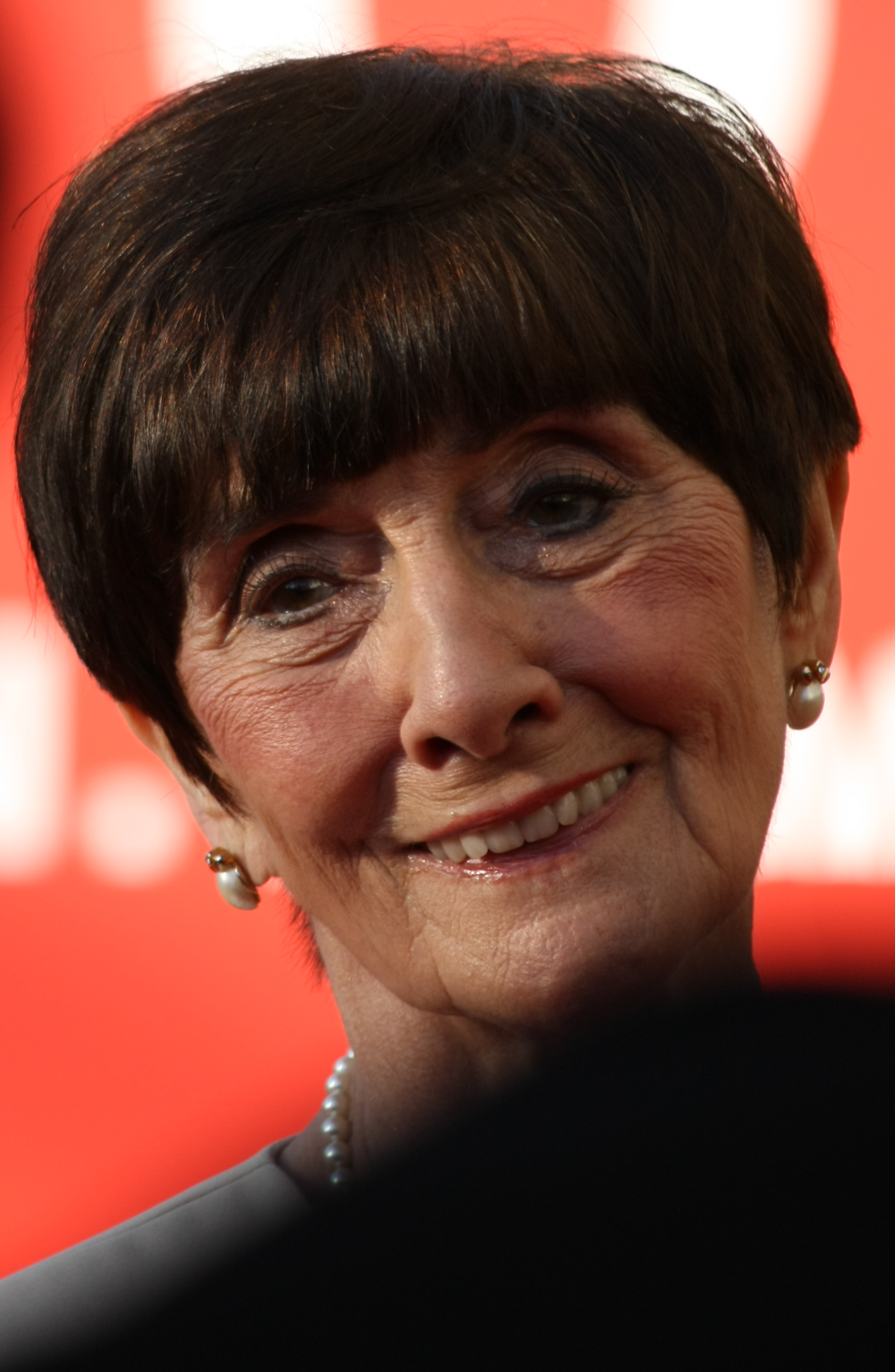
June Brown won multiple awards for her portrayal of Dot.

According to author Pauline Frommer, Dot has been embraced by the viewing British population as a cultural archetype. Brown has suggested that Dot has universal appeal because everybody knows a person like Dot. In 2009, a poll by magazine Inside Soap named Dot as the UK's 'greatest gossip' in a soap opera.

Brown was nominated for the 'Best Actress' BAFTA award for Dot's single-hander EastEnders episode in 2009; she became the first soap actress nominated in the category since 1988, when Jean Alexander was shortlisted for her role as Hilda Ogden in Coronation Street. The show's executive producer, Diederick Santer, described Brown's BAFTA nomination as his proudest moment of 2009, saying: "I'm not one to complain to the referee, but it's beyond me why she didn't win. Week in, week out, she turns out amazing performances. The audience knew it and we knew it. With the greatest respect to the actress who won, you could hear the audience in the Royal Festival Hall that night sigh with disappointment. It was a missed opportunity by BAFTA – of which I'm a member – to connect with a big audience." Brown has also won 'Best Actress' for her role as Dot at the Inside Soap Awards in 2001 and 2004, as well as the 'Outstanding Achievement' award in 2003, and 'Best Couple' in 2005 with John Bardon, as Dot and Jim Branning. She and Bardon also won 'Best On-Screen Partnership' at The British Soap Awards in both 2002 and 2005, while in 2005, Brown won a 'Lifetime Achievement' award for her role, again at the British Soap Awards. The role also resulted in several award nominations including a 'Most Popular Actress' nomination at the National Television Awards in 2005, and a 'Best Actress' nomination at the 2007 TV Quick and TV Choice Awards among others. Dot was also voted the 46th best television character in a television poll entitled The 100 Greatest Television Characters.

At the time of the 2005 general election, Labour chiefs feared that an episode of EastEnders in which Dot learned to drive could distract viewers from voting. In the same year, Dot was criticised as revealing an anti-religious bias on the part of the BBC. Dr Indarjit Singh, editor of the Sikh Messenger and patron of the World Congress of Faiths suggested that Dot's endless quoting from the Bible served to ridicule religion. The character has been cited as an example of anti-Christian bias in the media. The BBC were accused of portraying Christians as old-fashioned in 2008 after an episode aired in which Dot asked a gay, male couple to stop kissing. The BBC responded, "EastEnders aims to reflect real life, and this means including and telling stories about characters from many different backgrounds, faiths, religions and sexualities." In a report to the BBC's Board of Governors in July 2004 regarding religion, Dot was used as an example of how religion can be portrayed as stereotypical "out-of-date and occasionally offensive" in drama and entertainment output, that Christian figures are highlighted because of their faith "rather than seen as normal people who also have a religious belief". It was suggested that some Christians think Dot "is made deliberately unappealing to audiences by her eccentric traits and hypocritical behaviour". However, it was also suggested that others think she is convincing.

Brown's single-hander episode of EastEnders received much critical acclaim. The Guardian' Nancy Banks-Smith deemed Brown possibly the only member of the cast with the exception of Barbara Windsor (Peggy Mitchell) capable of carrying such a monologue. Robert Hanks for The Independent wrote that "I don't ever remember hearing anybody on a soap talk like this before. I mean, like a real person, with real feelings, such as self-pity and a desperate urge for self-preservation. Brown conveyed the seedy gloom of it all beautifully, as well." Conversely, Tim Teeman posed the question in The Times: "I know she's a national institution and June Brown plays her like a dream, but was last night's Dot Cotton extravaganza really that great? Or even necessary?" Teeman opined that: "Quite rightly, the producers want to eke as much gold out of the character and actress as possible: both are fantastic. But this was much-loved character overkill." He deemed Dot a "soap icon", however he also assessed that:

This was a tour de force for sure – but an indulgent one. It didn't unlock anything substantially new to Dot. [...] Far from making us care more about Dot – we do anyway, it was preaching to the converted – it was a little, well, dull. Boring even. [...] [T]he episode revealed a nagging weakness: Coronation Street has a fine repertory of older characters and actors which gives the show its wonderful link to the past. In EastEnders, the same gatekeeping roles are played by Dot and Ian Beale: she is a jewel but, as she said, an all-too lonely one. Cherish her, absolutely, but don't turn her into a drag act.

The Daily Telegraph's Gerard O'Donovan agreed that "June Brown, as Dot, was mesmerising", but was similarly critical of the episode as a whole, concluding: "Overall [...] the feeling couldn't be avoided that in the greater scheme of things this was a fuss over nothing. Had it been a swan song, it would have been a worthy one. But doubtless Dot will be out and about again tonight, fag in hand, quoting from the Good Book. Enjoyable as this Albert Square indulgence was, I suspect that most fans will be hoping this one-hander remains a one-off." Leigh Holmwood for The Guardian suggested that viewers may have agreed with O'Donovan's assessment, highlighting the fact that the episode received only 8.7 million viewers, compared to 9.4 million watching EastEnders the previous week. A 2003 episode centred on Dot also resulted in a notable ratings slump. The New Year episode, which detailed her childhood evacuation to the countryside, received just 8.1 million viewers, compared with 12.2m the previous evening and 16m on Christmas Day. Prior to this, however, a 2002 two-hander episode featuring just Dot and Sonia Jackson (Natalie Cassidy) was watched by 11.5 million viewers, with an almost 60% share of viewers in the timeslot. In 2020, Sara Wallis and Ian Hyland from The Daily Mirror placed Dot sixth on their ranked list of the best EastEnders characters of all time, calling her a "Legendary, perfectly-coiffed, chain-smoking busybody" and a "tragicomic icon" who had "put up with plenty over the years".

== In popular culture ==
The character of Dot Cotton has been spoofed in the cartoon sketch show 2DTV. She was also impersonated by Alistair McGowan in his television series Big Impression. As part of the sketch, Dot and her son Nick were morphed into a version of the sitcom duo Steptoe and Son. McGowan stated in 2001 that Dot was his favourite impression, because he "looks a bit like her".

Dot's old-fashioned style of dress has been likened to the clothing collection of Prada's designer, Miuccia Prada. Dot has been said to have inspired clothing and hairstyles and has been quoted by various fashion professionals as a style icon. She has also inspired catwalk themes, such as that of aspiring designer Hollie Luxton in 2007, who stated, "I wanted to capture the nostalgia of the bygone days and play with the idea of clothing coming out of the wash misshapen and faded."

Dot's long-suffering, luckless life has also led to her being labelled as a gay icon by Tim Lusher of the Evening Standard. The monthly Dot Cotton Club, a gay club night in Cambridge, is named in her honour.

Dot is a notable smoker on British television as she regularly appears on-screen smoking. The character is so synonymous with smoking that the term "Dot Cotton syndrome" is used within the health industry to: "describe the elderly population who continue to smoke heavily without registering the health problems they are or will soon suffer from, seeing it as their only pleasure left in life".

Impressionist Francine Lewis performed an impression of Dot Cotton in the seventh series of Britain's Got Talent. During 2003, a promotional advertisement for the BBC featuring a character, Fizz, from the children's television programme The Tweenies pulling off a mask and morphing into Dot received complaints. Parents complained that their children were having nightmares and the BBC subsequently moved back the screening times.

In the BBC drama Line of Duty one of the prominent detectives in series 1–3, Matthew Cottan, is nicknamed "Dot", on account of his surname.

== See also ==
- List of EastEnders characters (1985)
