= List of EastEnders television spin-offs =

EastEnders is a British soap opera that has aired on BBC One since 19 February 1985. Several spin-off shows have been made, some of which use the narrative of flashbacks to explore the history of the show's characters, such as "CivvyStreet". Others have been a lead-up for a character's eventual return to the show, like the "Return of Nick Cotton", and some have followed characters who had departed from the show in another setting, such as the 2017 spin-off series Kat & Alfie: Redwater. With the exception of "CivvyStreet", which was set within the show's fictional location of Albert Square during the Second World War, these spin-offs take place in a different setting.

Documentaries have also aired, particularly for the anniversaries of the show, looking back at the history of the show's inception, its characters and storylines.

== Spin-off series ==
=== EastEnders: E20 ===
In October 2009, a 12-part Internet spin-off series entitled EastEnders: E20 was announced. The series was conceived by executive producer Diederick Santer "as a way of nurturing new, young talent, both on- and off-screen, and exploring the stories of the soaps' anonymous bystanders." E20 features a group of sixth-form characters and targets the "Hollyoaks demographic". It was written by a team of young writers and was shown three times a week on the EastEnders website from 8 January 2010. A second ten-part series started in September 2010, with twice-weekly episodes available online and an omnibus on BBC Three. A third series of 15 episodes started in September 2011.

=== Kat and Alfie: Redwater ===
On 4 April 2015, plans for a BBC One series featuring Kat Moon and Alfie Moon were announced. The six-part drama, Kat and Alfie: Redwater, was created by executive producer Dominic Treadwell-Collins and started in May 2017. In the series, the Moons visit Ireland where they "search for answers to some very big questions."

=== Tracey: A Day in the Life ===
A 5-part spin-off miniseries featuring long-running character Tracey (Jane Slaughter) was released on 2 December 2024 as part of the BBC Studios Talentworks initiative. The plot revolved around Tracey reuniting with her son Tom (Oliver Llewellyn Jenkins) after they lost contact for years, during her 60th birthday celebrations. Linda Carter (Kellie Bright), Elaine Peacock (Harriet Thorpe) and Ian Beale (Adam Woodyatt) make guest appearances in the miniseries.

== EastEnders "bubbles" ==
=== "CivvyStreet" ===
"CivvyStreet" is a spin-off episode of EastEnders broadcast on BBC1 on 26 December 1988. The episode is a flashback to World War II and is set at Christmas 1942. It was watched by 7 million viewers.

=== "Return of Nick Cotton" ===
This episode first aired on 1 October 2000 and was a lead-up to the return of Nick Cotton as a regular character later that year, more than two years after his last appearance. It was written by Matthew Graham and directed by Chris Bernard. The episode followed Nick as he has just been released from prison. Fast forward to 10 weeks later and he was living in a squat in North London. He then had a dream where his dead father Charlie appeared and warned him that something terrible is about to happen to him. He was told by a black gay couple living in the squat with him that seeing your own dead relatives in your dreams was a bad sign but Nick was not worried. He then decided to meet up with his son Ashley and ex-wife Zoe and went to Zoe's brother Eddie to ask for her address. He also had some mean-looking thugs on his trail, a father and son named Colin and Little Col, who had a score to settle with him from their time in prison. He met up with Ashley who revealed he and Zoe were living with Zoe's new boyfriend. The thugs discover Nick's whereabouts and show up at Zoe's house trying to break in. The police arrive and arrest Colin and Col. To escape them Ashley and Nick got into a stolen convertible car and drove off. Zoe pleaded with Ashley not to go with Nick knowing he would be a bad influence but Ashley did not listen. Then just before the end of the episode Nick and Ashley were discussing where to go from here and Nick says "Let's hit the road for a bit, and then just maybe...we'll go and see Ma," and they decided to travel around for a bit before their eventual return to Walford.

=== "Ricky & Bianca" ===
This two-part episode aired on 13 and 20 May 2002, originally these episodes were planned to air over the Christmas period in 2001 but filming was delayed due to Patsy Palmer's pregnancy.

This two part special was a lead-up to Ricky Butcher's return later that year as a regular character. It was written by Simon Ashdown. The episode saw Ricky reunite with his ex-wife Bianca Jackson and son Liam in Manchester. Bianca had been in Manchester doing an arts degree for the past two and a half years and was struggling to look after Liam.

Ricky discovered she had been working in a nightclub and had stolen money from the manager Vince. Ricky ended up getting caught in the middle of all of this along with his new girlfriend Cassie. After he got Bianca out of trouble, they had a one-night stand during which Bianca conceived their daughter Tiffany. Ricky told Cassie he didn't really love her, he was still in love with Bianca. Cassie managed to manipulate Bianca into thinking that she and Ricky would never be happy together, and Bianca made the difficult decision to leave Liam with Ricky, feeling that he'd be a better parent than she would, and left in a taxi.

Nancy Banks-Smith of The Guardian described the episodes as, "A cynical way of shooing Ricky back into Albert Square. [...] These let's-do-the-show-somewhere-else specials tend to be tiresome. This one seems to be a way of easing Ricky back into EastEnders. Pete Shelley of the Daily Mirror said, "A shot of a pasty-faced, grumpy-looking orang-utan told us that this episode marked the return of Bianca... I won't bore you with the details of Simon Ashdown's plot, suffice to say that it was worthy of a Brookside Christmas video starring Lindsey Corkhill." Simon Edge of the Daily Express said "EastEnders spin-offs usually set off the cringe alarm. But this one is a hoot, mainly because Patsy Palmer is sending herself up something rotten – normally only drag queens can manage a falsetto squeal that high – and because she and Sid Owen look so pleased to be there."

Tina Baker, for GMTV said "The Ricky and Bianca spin-off didn't quite work, It just wasn't quite as good as when they were in Albert Square with all the other characters. It's a bit of a danger when characters have already left the soap and then they return in a spin-off."

=== "Dot's Story" ===
This episode first aired on 2 January 2003 and followed Dot Branning (June Brown) to Wales to visit the family she stayed with during World War II. Through a series of flashbacks, we see Dot being evacuated, and her experiences of evacuation. Her guardians Gwen and Will are featured in the episode.

=== "Perfectly Frank" ===
This episode aired on 21 September 2003 and followed Frank Butcher as he set up a seedy nightclub and a car valeting service in Somerset after returning from Spain where he was last seen in 2002. When Frank is sent a car to valet by the local gangster named Reg Priest, his assistant finds a dead body in the boot. Frank and his club staff try to find a way to avoid the police asking questions and fall foul of Reg so they throw the body into the water over the side of the pier. The episode was written by Tony Jordan.

=== "Pat and Mo" ===
This feature-length episode first aired on 1 April 2004 and revealed what caused the feud between Pat Evans and Mo Harris that lasted until Pat's death in 2012. Pat and Mo meet at the grave of Pat's brother and Mo's husband, Jimmy, and reminisce about old times through a series of flashbacks. Mo's brother, Stan Porter, also appeared in the episode. Young Pat was played by Emma Cooke and young Mo was played by Lorraine Stanley, who would go on to play Karen Taylor thirteen years later.

== Red Button episodes ==
=== "Phil On Remand" ===
After being sent to prison for his wrongful involvement in the death of Stella Crawford, Phil Mitchell finds himself the reluctant mentor to a new prisoner when he runs afoul of the top dog.

=== "Dorothy Branning: The Next Chapter" ===
This episode first aired on BBC's Red Button service on 11 January 2013. Abi Branning (Lorna Fitzgerald) tracks down her step grandmother Dot Branning (June Brown), who has been living away from Walford with her granddaughter Dotty Cotton (Molly Conlin), following the revelation that her father Max (Jake Wood) has a secret wife, Kirsty (Kierston Wareing) and the fallout it had caused for her family, including Max's current fiancé/ex-wife and Abi's mother Tanya (Jo Joyner). She convinces Dot to return home to Walford when she recognises how she is lonely, starting the 'next chapter' in Dot's life. It acted as the return of June Brown to the role of Dot after six months away.

=== "T & B 4 Eva" ===
This episode first aired on BBC's Red Button service on 8 November 2013. Bianca Butcher (Patsy Palmer) is studying to become a beautician in Manchester for six weeks, away from her family in Walford. She meets the charming Terry Spraggan (Terry Alderton) and they fall for each other and eventually start a relationship. The episode led to the eventual introduction of Terry and his family when they returned to Walford with Bianca when the six-week course ended.

== Documentaries ==
Several documentaries have been made about EastEnders, usually broadcast on BBC Three. Since February 2010, Watch started repeating various EastEnders documentaries. Since then, they occasionally show documentaries on Saturdays and Sundays.

=== EastEnders Revealed ===
EastEnders Revealed is a factual entertainment programme that looks back at the storylines, characters and stars of EastEnders. It first aired in December 1998 as part of the new BBC digital channel (BBC Choice) line-up and last aired in March 2011. EastEnders Revealed was the only BBC Choice programme to last the entire life of the channel, and was carried over to its replacement BBC Three where it continued until 2011. It has been presented by Gail Porter, Harriet Saxton, Jayne Middlemiss, Edith Bowman, Colin Murray, Melanie Sykes and Tracy-Ann Oberman.

The episodes are 30 or 60 minutes in length and, on occasions, have been broadcast on the BBC's flagship channel, BBC One. This is usually after a major storyline has been taking place in EastEnders, for example when Leslie Grantham (Den Watts) returned to the show in 2003, when Wendy Richard (Pauline Fowler) left and when Barbara Windsor (Peggy Mitchell) left.

EastEnders Revealed finally returned in February 2025 for the 40th Anniversary of the show.

==== List of titled episodes ====
Title	Subject(s) of episode	Original release date
"Behind the scenes"	N/A	4 February 1999
"Grant Mitchell Revealed"	Grant Mitchell	25 October 1999
"Ricky Butcher Revealed"	Ricky Butcher	20 April 2000
"Frank Butcher Revealed"	Frank Butcher	2 November 2000
"Sharon Watts Revealed"	Sharon Watts	19 July 2001
"Dot to Dot"	Dot Cotton	24 August 2001
"Slaters Revealed"	Slater family	8 October 2001
"Truemans Revealed"	Trueman family	12 November 2001
"Mel Revealed"	Mel Owen	3 December 2001
"The Jacksons Revealed"	Jackson family	14 January 2002
"Being Peggy Mitchell"	Peggy Mitchell	11 February 2002
"Trouble Man: A Steve Owen Special"	Steve Owen	1 March 2002
"The Fowlers"	Fowler family	1 April 2002
"Mel Leaving Special"	Mel Owen	12 April 2002
"Angie And Me"	Angie Watts	22 April 2002
"Janine Butcher"	Janine Butcher	27 May 2002
"Through Kat's Eyes"	Kat Slater	9 September 2002
"Jamie Mitchell"	Jamie Mitchell	10 October 2002
"And Sparks Will Fly"	Trevor Morgan	4 November 2002
"A Year in the Life of Sam Mitchell"	Sam Mitchell	17 January 2003
"Mark Fowler's Story"	Mark Fowler	15 February 2003
"Laura Beale Unravelled"	Laura Beale	18 February 2003
"Being Barry Evans"	Barry Evans	17 March 2003
"The Coming of Age of Sonia Jackson"	Sonia Fowler	6 May 2003
"Walford's Brat Pack"	Vicki Fowler, Gus Smith, Spencer Moon, Kelly Taylor, Zoe Slater, Martin Fowler	20 June 2003
"The Dr. Trueman Show"	Anthony Trueman	11 July 2003
"Dirty Den Returns"	Den Watts	26 September 2003
"The Life and Crimes of Martin Fowler"	Martin Fowler	14 October 2003
"In Bed with Garry Hobbs"	Garry Hobbs-Laura Beale	18 November 2003
"Mean, Lean and Deadly Janine"	Janine Butcher	1 January 2004
"Alfie's Story"	Alfie Moon	2 February 2004
"Blood Feud: The Watts vs. The Mitchells"	Watts and Mitchell families	12 February 2004
"The Real Billy Mitchell"	Billy Mitchell	20 February 2004
"The Rise and Fall of Janine Butcher"	Janine Butcher	26 February 2004
"Natalie Evans"	Natalie Evans	22 March 2004
"Squaring up to the Ferreiras"	Ferreira family	26 March 2004
"The Growing Pains of Spencer Moon"	Spencer Moon	4 May 2004
"Sonia and Martin – Love Conquers All"	Martin Fowler and Sonia Fowler	11 June 2004
"Kelly Taylor – Working Girl"	Kelly Taylor	1 July 2004
"The Real Paul Trueman"	Paul Trueman	23 July 2004
"Sam Mitchell – Happy Ever After?"	Sam Mitchell	16 September 2004
"The One and Only Dot Cotton"	Dot Cotton	30 September 2004
"Andy Hunter – Hunter's Prey"	Andy Hunter	9 December 2004
"Little Mo's Big Story"	Little Mo Mitchell	26 December 2004
"Ian Beale – The Real Deal?"	Ian Beale	3 February 2005
"The New Moons"	Alfie Moon, Spencer Moon and Nana Moon	17 February 2005
"The Growing Pains of Zoe Slater"	Zoe Slater	17 March 2005
"The Curse of the Queen Vic"	The Queen Victoria public house	31 March 2005
"The Make-up of Kat Moon"	Kat Slater	27 May 2005
"Meet the Millers"	Miller family	31 May 2005
"Growing up in Walford"	Walford's youths	14 June 2005
"Jim & Dot – When Opposites Attract"	Jim Branning and Dot Cotton	16 August 2005
"Chrissie Watts: Victim or Villain?"	Chrissie Watts	22 September 2005
"The Duchess Returns"	Peggy Mitchell	4 October 2005
"Goodbye, Pauline"	Pauline Fowler	1 January 2007
"The Secret Mitchell"	Danielle Jones and Ronnie Mitchell	3 April 2009
"The Sins of Archie Mitchell"	Archie Mitchell	26 December 2009
"Whitney's Story"	Whitney Dean	22 March 2011
"The Murder"	Heather Trott and Ben Mitchell	22 March 2012
"The Lock-In"	40th Anniversary Special	19 February 2025

=== EastEnders Xtra ===
EastEnders Xtra was an interactive entertainment series based on EastEnders. It was first available to viewers in February 2005, which coincided with the 20th anniversary of EastEnders. Television viewers could watch the show by pressing the red button on their television remote, at 8.30pm on Monday nights. The programme was presented by CBBC presenter Angellica Bell and was approximately 15 to 20 minutes in length. It was primarily aimed at younger fans of EastEnders. It featured games and interviews with cast members, looked behind the scenes and allowed viewers to take part in quizzes on their mobile phones. The series was produced by Simon Hall. The theme and music used within the show was a rocked up version of the EastEnders theme tune.

The series ran for ten weeks, featuring ten episodes. Each episode featured an EastEnders star as a co-presenter. In the first episode, Tracy-Ann Oberman who played Chrissie Watts explained that The Queen Victoria pub uses exterior and interior sets for filming. Perry Fenwick who plays Billy Mitchell took part in "Extractor", a part of EastEnders Xtra which asks cast members a series of questions. The other co-presenters were Nabil Elouahabi (Tariq Larousi), Pooja Shah (Kareena Ferreira), Jemma Walker (Sasha Perkins), Natalie Cassidy (Sonia Fowler), Ameet Chana (Adi Ferreira), Cliff Parisi (Minty Peterson), Joe Swash (Mickey Miller) and Mohammed George (Gus Smith).

=== EastEnders: Back to Ours ===
EastEnders: Back to Ours is a series which aired on BBC iPlayer and BBC Red Button. The first series contains six episodes, made available over the course of 27 January–12 February 2015 as part of the show's 30th anniversary celebrations. On 18 September 2015, a second run of two episodes was announced, to be shown on 28 September and 2 October 2015. It returned for a third time on 1 January 2016 for a one-off special. It features several cast members, past and present, looking over their greatest moments on the show, in a format similar to Gogglebox. The first series attracted 2.8 million requests.

#	Stars	Original release date
Series 1
1	Shane Richie and Jessie Wallace (Alfie Moon and Kat Slater)	27 January 2015
2	Samantha Womack and Rita Simons (Ronnie and Roxy Mitchell)	29 January 2015
3	Nitin Ganatra and Himesh Patel (Masood Ahmed and Tamwar Masood)	3 February 2015
4	Diane Parish, Rudolph Walker and Tameka Empson (Denise Fox, Patrick Trueman and Kim Fox)	5 February 2015
5	Adam Woodyatt and Laurie Brett (Ian and Jane Beale)	10 February 2015
6	Barbara Windsor and Pam St Clement (Peggy Mitchell and Pat Butcher)	12 February 2015
Series 2
7	Jake Wood, Jacqueline Jossa and Lorna Fitzgerald (Max, Lauren and Abi Branning)	28 September 2015
8	Lindsey Coulson and Natalie Cassidy (Carol Jackson and Sonia Fowler)	2 October 2015
9	Danny Dyer and Kellie Bright (Mick and Linda Carter)	1 January 2016

=== EastEnders: The Real Stories ===
EastEnders: The Real Stories is a series of six short episodes that was made available on BBC Three from 6 July 2018 to tie in with episode 5737, in which Shakil Kazemi's (Shaheen Jafargholi) funeral takes place after he is stabbed and killed. The episodes feature real people talking about their family members who were murdered.

#	Title
1	"Godwin's story"
Yvonne Lawson, mother of Godwin Lawson (1993–2010) talks about when her son was stabbed in Amhurst Park in Stamford Hill and the effect it had on her. Godwin was a 17-year-old promising footballer who witnessed two of his friends being attacked and tried to stop the fight. Yvonne went on to set up a foundation to tackle gun and knife crime.
2	"Jay's story"
Caroline Shearer mother of Jay Whiston (1995–2012), talks about the last time she saw her son before he was attacked by five people who gatecrashed a party as he begged to be let go, how she was told about his death and the effect it has had on her life. Caroline worked to promote awareness of weapons among young people.
3	"Dwayne's story"
Dwayne Simpson (1993–2014) was a caring, sensitive person who looked after people and tried to help them. His mother, Lorraine Jones, talks about his life and how he was stabbed through the heart with a sword while trying to help someone who was being chased, and how she was with him when he died. She continues to run a project that Dwayne started to support and empower people living in Lambeth.
4	"Jason's story"
Angela Spencer and John Greensmith, mother and stepfather of Jason Spencer (1989–2007), talk about the day Jason went to see a friend with an idea he had, and then they saw a commotion outside. John was told by a police officer that Jason was dead, killed because he refused to pay for a torn jacket. In the video, Angela urges viewers to cherish their loved ones. The couple set up a trust to support families who suffered bereavement through violent crime.
5	"Shaquan's story"
Jessica Plummer, mother of Shaquan Sammy-Plummer (1998–2015), speaks about her loving son who she brought up to be respectful. He went to a party where a boy denied knowing him and asked for Shaquan's bag; Shaquan refused and decided to leave, but the boy took a knife and stabbed Shaquan in the chest. Jessica was informed of his death by a surgeon. The following week, she received calls from five universities saying Shaquan had been accepted into them all. She since set up a foundation to educate people about the effects of knife crime.
6	"Eugene's story"
Eugene Bergan (1975–2002) was an aspiring DJ. His mother, Trish Bergan, speaks about the day Eugene came home and called her to say he would use the back door instead of the front; Trish waited but five minutes later he had not arrived. A neighbour then informed her that he had been stabbed in the neck, and Trish was told he had died at the hospital. She found a national support group for victims of murder and manslaughter and went on to volunteer for them and became a committee member.

=== EastEnders: Secrets from the Square ===
EastEnders: Secrets from the Square is a documentary series hosted by Stacey Dooley on BBC One. The programme was broadcast as a response to the COVID-19 pandemic which led to the suspension of production on EastEnders. The series includes Dooley interviewing cast members such as Adam Woodyatt, Letitia Dean, Diane Parish, Kellie Bright and Danny Dyer about their experiences on EastEnders.

#	Title	Original release date
1	"Mick and Linda"	22 June 2020
Featuring on-screen husband and wife Danny Dyer (Mick Carter) and Kellie Bright (Linda Carter) and visiting the set of The Queen Victoria public house.
2	"Ian and Sharon"	29 June 2020
Featuring original cast members Adam Woodyatt (Ian Beale) and Letitia Dean (Sharon Watts) and visiting the set of the café.
3	"Martin and Kush"	6 July 2020
Featuring on-screen best friends James Bye (Martin Fowler) and Davood Ghadami (Kush Kazemi).
4	"Ben and Callum"	13 July 2020
Featuring on-screen couple Max Bowden (Ben Mitchell) and Tony Clay (Callum Highway).
5	"Denise and Kim"	20 July 2020
Featuring on-screen sisters Diane Parish (Denise Fox) and Tameka Empson (Kim Fox) and visiting the set of the hair salon.
6	"Kathy and Ian"	27 July 2020
Featuring on-screen mother and son Gillian Taylforth (Kathy Beale) and Adam Woodyatt (Ian Beale) and visiting the set of the Beale family home, No. 45 Albert Square.
7	"Max and Jack"	3 August 2020
Featuring on-screen brothers Jake Wood (Max Branning) and Scott Maslen (Jack Branning) and visiting the set of Jack's flat.
8	"Tiffany, Keegan and Karen"	10 August 2020
Featuring Maisie Smith (Tiffany Butcher), Smith's on-screen husband Zack Morris (Keegan Baker) and Morris's on-screen mother Lorraine Stanley (Karen Taylor).
9	"Landladies Special"	17 August 2020
Featuring Letitia Dean (Sharon Watts) and Kellie Bright (Linda Carter), discussing the various landladies of The Queen Victoria public house, including Angie Watts (Anita Dobson), Pat Butcher (Pam St Clement) and Peggy Mitchell (Barbara Windsor).
10	"Shirley and Tina"	24 August 2020
Featuring on-screen sisters Linda Henry (Shirley Carter) and Luisa Bradshaw-White (Tina Carter) and visiting the set of the upstairs of The Queen Victoria public house.
11	"Karen, Chantelle and Gray"	25 August 2020
Featuring Lorraine Stanley (Karen Taylor), Stanley's on-screen daughter Jessica Plummer (Chantelle Atkins) and Plummer's on-screen husband Toby-Alexander Smith (Gray Atkins) and visiting the set of Chantelle and Gray's home, No. 1 Albert Square.
12	"Whitney and Sonia"	1 September 2020
Featuring on-screen niece and aunt Shona McGarty (Whitney Dean) and Natalie Cassidy (Sonia Fowler) and visiting the set of Dot Cotton's (June Brown) house.
13	"Kat and Stacey"	3 September 2020
Featuring on-screen cousins Jessie Wallace (Kat Slater) and Lacey Turner (Stacey Slater) and visiting the set of the Slater family's home, No. 31 Albert Square.
14	"Unseen"	4 September 2020
Stacey Dooley presents a compilation of unseen moments from the previous episodes.

=== EastEnders: The Six ===
EastEnders: The Six is a two-part documentary series hosted by Joe Swash, who previously played Mickey Miller on the soap from 2003 to 2008 and 2011. The programme was broadcast in response to the build-up and resolution to the overarching 2023 storyline, dubbed The Six, where a flashforward took place in February 2023 which saw Linda Carter (Kellie Bright), Suki Panesar (Balvinder Sopal), Kathy Beale (Gillian Taylforth), Stacey Slater (Lacey Turner), Denise Fox (Diane Parish) and Sharon Watts (Letitia Dean) gathered among a dead body of a man on Christmas Day 2023. The documentary series highlighted the potential motives of each of the six characters and the revelation of who committed the murder.

#	Title	Original release date
1	"Revealed"	11 December 2023
The six women involved in the Christmas storyline are questioned by Joe Swash on their individual storylines and their potential motives for murder.
2	"Whodunnit"	25 December 2023
The Christmas killer is revealed to be Linda Carter who murders Keanu Taylor (Danny Walters). Executive producer Chris Clenshaw meets with Kellie and reveals to her that her character would be the murderer.

=== Other documentaries ===
Just Another Day was a six-part documentary series presented John Pitman that looked at places which are part of the British way of life. The first episode, broadcast on 14 November 1986, went behind the scenes of EastEnders.

EastEnders Family Album was a special documentary which first aired on 13 February 2000 to celebrate the upcoming 15th anniversary of EastEnders. Narrated by Linda Robson, the documentary looked back at some of the most memorable storylines and characters in the show and featured interviews with past and present cast members.

EastEnders: The Whole Truth was a series of five documentary episodes, three pre-recorded and two live, broadcast every day from 2–6 April 2001, presented by Gaby Roslin. The first three, pre-recorded episodes were broadcast at 12:00pm, whereas the two live episodes were broadcast before the main EastEnders shows on those days. EastEnders: The Whole Truth examined the "Who Shot Phil?" storyline, including interviews with several cast members. Episode 5 was broadcast before the assailant, Lisa Fowler (Lucy Benjamin), was revealed to the public, and episode 6 gauged the reaction the following evening.

A-Z of EastEnders was a documentary broadcast on the twentieth anniversary of EastEnders in 2005 and presented by Jonathan Ross.

Since 1 December 2006, a new style of behind-the-scenes programmes have been broadcast on BBC Three, and on BBC Red Button following the closure of BBC Three. These are all documentaries related to current storylines in EastEnders, in a similar format to EastEnders Revealed, though not using the EastEnders Revealed name. The include clips from the series and interviews with the show's cast and crew as well as TV critics such as Sharon Marshall. Documentaries have included:

- EastEnders Unveiled: A Weddings Special, 1 December 2006, giving an insight into how the show's weddings are produced, and took a look at the past weddings of Walford. It was broadcast straight after the wedding of Ian Beale (Adam Woodyatt) and Jane Collins (Laurie Brett).
- EastEnders Sweethearts: The Story of Martin and Sonia, on 2 February 2007, following the departure of Martin (James Alexandrou) and Sonia Fowler (Natalie Cassidy).
- EastEnders Scandals: The Wicks Family, 8 March 2007, coinciding with Kevin Wicks' (Phil Daniels) return to Walford.
- EastEnders Feuds: The Beales vs. The Mitchells, 18 May 2007, examining the feud between Ian Beale (Adam Woodyatt) and Phil Mitchell (Steve McFadden) and going behind the scenes of episodes broadcast on 17–21 May.
- EastEnders Vixens: The Rise and Fall of Stella, 20 July 2007, following the death of Stella Crawford (Sophie Thompson) and looking at the various female characters in EastEnders past and present.
- EastEnders Affairs: Max and Stacey, 1 November 2007, looking at the relationship between characters Stacey Slater (Lacey Turner), her fiancé Bradley Branning (Charlie Clements) and his father Max Branning (Jake Wood).
- EastEnders Christmas Fall Outs, 26 December 2007, looking back at Christmas episodes and going behind the scenes of 2007's Christmas episodes.
- EastEnders Ricky and Bianca, 4 April 2008, constructed in aid of the return to EastEnders by Ricky Butcher (Sid Owen) and Bianca Jackson (Patsy Palmer), looking back on the relationship of the two characters.
- EastEnders: Whodunnits, 31 October 2008, showing infamous whodunnit storylines such as the murder of Reg Cox (Johnnie Clayton), following the whodunnit of Max Branning (Jake Wood) being run over by an unknown assailant.
- EastEnders: Comebacks, 30 December 2008, celebrating the return of Nick Cotton (John Altman).
- EastEnders: The Return of Sam Mitchell, 11 September 2009, in conjunction with the return of character Sam Mitchell (Danniella Westbrook).
- EastEnders: The Two Faces of Lucas, 26 November 2009, looks at the character of Lucas Johnson (Don Gilet) as well as other characters who have had a "turning point" in their storyline.
- EastEnders: The Greatest Cliffhangers, a three-part series on BBC Three, featuring 100 cliffhangers from the first 3918 episodes to find out which character had the most endings. It aired as part of the show's 25th anniversary celebrations. The first part aired on 26 January 2010, the second on 2 February 2010 and the third on 16 February 2010. The character turned out to be Phil Mitchell (Steve McFadden).
- EastEnders Live: The Aftermath, 19 February 2010, a special show hosted by George Lamb after the show's first live episode on the 25th anniversary.
- EastEnders: Christian and Syed, 26 April 2010, following the reveal of Syed Masood's (Marc Elliott) affair with Christian Clarke (John Partridge) and the departure of his wife Amira (Preeya Kalidas). The programme also looked at other gay, lesbian and bisexual characters from EastEnders' history (see List of LGBT characters in soap operas).
- EastEnders: The Murders of Lucas Johnson, 30 July 2010, looked at the story of Lucas Johnson (Don Gilet) and other character deaths from EastEnders' history.
- Peggy Mitchell – Queen of the Vic, 10 September 2010, looked at ten moments from Peggy Mitchell's (Barbara Windsor) time in the show. The episode was broadcast on BBC One following Peggy's departure.
- EastEnders: Kat and Alfie's Return, 24 September 2010, followed the return of Shane Richie and Jessie Wallace as Alfie and Kat Moon. It looked at their history as well as Kat's family, the Slaters, and also went behind the scenes of the fire at The Queen Victoria public house (see Queen Vic Fire Week).
- EastEnders: The Greatest Weddings, 11 and 12 November 2010, a two-part documentary counting down the top 50 weddings from EastEnders history. This episode aired following the screen wedding of Ronnie Mitchell (Samantha Womack) and Jack Branning (Scott Maslen).
- EastEnders: Farewell Stacey, 28 December 2010, documenting the story of Stacey Slater (Lacey Turner) following her departure.
- EastEnders: Greatest Exits, 7 July 2011, discussing the ways characters leave the series, ending with the five best. This episode was broadcast following the departure of Ronnie Branning (Samantha Womack).
- EastEnders: The New Moons, 6 October 2011, followed the storyline involving Michael (Steve John Shepherd) and Eddie Moon (David Essex) following Eddie's departure. It also looked at the arrivals of the new members of the Moon family, and the other fathers that have been on the Square.
- EastEnders: Farewell Pat, 2 January 2012, following Pat Evans (Pam St Clement) departure this programme looks back at Pat's greatest moments and celebrates her 25 years on the Square.
- EastEnders: 30 Years of Cliffhangers, an updated three-part series on BBC Three, airing as part of the show's 30th anniversary celebrations. The first part aired on 27 January 2015, the second on 5 February 2015 and the third on 12 February 2015.
- EastEnders: Backstage Live, 20 February 2015, a special show hosted by Zoe Ball, Joe Swash, and Ore Oduba after the full live episode which ended EastEnders Live Week.
- Stacey Branning – On the Edge, 11 January 2016, followed the development of Stacey Branning's (Lacey Turner) postpartum psychosis storyline. The 13-minute documentary was first broadcast on BBC iPlayer following the episode in which Stacey climbs onto the roof of The Queen Victoria public house.
- Peggy Mitchell: Last Orders, 17 May 2016, broadcast on BBC Red Button following the episode in which Peggy Mitchell (Barbara Windsor) dies.
- EastEnders Investigates: The Manosphere, 9 October 2025, follows Joel Marshall's (Max Murray) incel storyline and the culture of the manosphere. The 30-minute documentary featured Murray, as well as Diane Parish and Ellie Dadd, who portray Denise Fox and Amy Mitchell respectively.

== Charity specials ==
In 1993, a Children in Need charity special crossover between EastEnders and the science fiction television series Doctor Who, Dimensions in Time, was transmitted for the 30th anniversary of Doctor Who. It ran in two parts on 26 and 27 November 1993 and was filmed on the EastEnders set. It featured several of the stars of the programme at the time. Another Children in Need special, Pudding Lane, was broadcast in a series of five-minute instalments throughout the 26 November 1999 telethon. It relocated the then current EastEnders characters to Pudding Lane in 1666, during the events leading to the Great Fire of London.

In 2003, a three part special was made for Children in Need named OzEnders, which saw the characters in a spoof remake of The Wizard of Oz. June Brown starred as Dorothy Cotton, Jon Culshaw as Ozzy Osbourne, and Adam Woodyatt as Ian Beale, and employed the rest of the cast of EastEnders, Merseybeat and Casualty.

In 2005, the characters Peggy Mitchell (Barbara Windsor), Stacey Slater (Lacey Turner) and Little Mo Mitchell (Kacey Ainsworth) appeared alongside Catherine Tate's character Lauren Cooper for a Children in Need sketch. Various EastEnders cast members have also appeared in sketches for Children in Need, performing songs with various themes. In 2007, they sang songs from The Beatles' Sgt. Pepper's Lonely Hearts Club Band, in 2008 they performed songs from West End musicals and in 2009 they performed renditions of classic songs produced by Motown Records. In 2011, they performed songs by Queen and recreated famous scenes from their videos. In 2013, the cast performed various styles of dance to different versions of "Get Lucky" by Daft Punk.

In EastEnders get Mile Ready on 15 March 2010, the cast of Eastenders do a fun run around Albert Square.

EastEnders and rival soap opera Coronation Street took part in a crossover episode for Children in Need on 19 November 2010, called "East Street". The EastEnders cast who took part in the mini-episode were Laurie Brett (Jane Beale), Charlie G. Hawkins (Darren Miller), Kylie Babbington (Jodie Gold), Nina Wadia (Zainab Masood), John Partridge (Christian Clarke), Diane Parish (Denise Johnson), Nitin Ganatra (Masood Ahmed), Jamie Borthwick (Jay Brown), Shane Richie (Alfie Moon), Jessie Wallace (Kat Moon), Ricky Norwood (Fatboy) and Shona McGarty (Whitney Dean).

In 2014, EastEnders made two specials for Children in Need; one being Grease-Enders and the more well known episode "The Ghosts of Ian Beale". The short followed Ian Beale (Adam Woodyatt) in a coma-like state exploring Albert Square and enchanting the women who had died from his past. Pat Butcher (Pam St Clement) was in The Queen Vic, Kathy Beale (Gillian Taylforth) was working at the café, and Cindy Beale (Michelle Collins) was cooking in the kitchen of Ian's house. It ended with him finally getting to say "Goodbye" to his daughter Lucy Beale (Hetti Bywater), part of the "Who Killed Lucy Beale?" storyline, which was still being broadcast at the time of the special being aired.

For Children in Need 2017, the cast took part in "EastEnd meets WestEnd", a performance of West End songs including "Step in Time" (Mary Poppins) and "Who Will Buy" (Oliver!). The special was shot differently to standard episodes of EastEnders which are filmed in high definition, instead it was filmed in ultra-high definition to give a cinematic feel. It was filmed on a Saturday in a single day and choreographed by Matt Flint.

For The Big Night In in April 2020, most actors who were in lockdown due to the COVID-19 pandemic in the United Kingdom appeared in a sketch via webcam in character ready to play a virtual quiz night hosted by Ian Beale (Adam Woodyatt). The sketch also received a cross over appearance from Coronation Street character Liz McDonald (Beverley Callard) who appeared to have been connected to the wrong video chat. This marked her second appearance in a sketch with some of the EastEnders cast as she had previously appeared in East Street. In another sketch, Prince William also declares that he is "missing EastEnders" due to episodes being cut.

== Other specials ==
On 10 August 2001, the BBC threw a gala party at the Television Centre in West London, which was attended by many EastEnders cast members. Part of the event was documented by the hour-long television show EastEnders: It's Your Party, hosted by Jonathan Ross. It featured several interviews with the cast. This was in celebration of the series' incoming fourth weekly episode.

Two musical themed Christmas specials, both titled EastEnders Christmas Party, aired on Christmas Eve 2003 and 2004, which had the cast and crew, both current and former of EastEnders singing, dancing and performing short comedy sketches.

== EastEnders-themed game shows ==
A one-off special episode of the quiz show A Question of Sport called A Question of EastEnders was broadcast on BBC One on 15 February 2000 to mark EastEnders' 15th anniversary on 19 February 2000. The special was hosted by Gaby Roslin, and had two teams, each led by a team captain; Wendy Richard (Pauline Fowler) and Adam Woodyatt (Ian Beale). On Richard's team were Blue Peter presenter Katy Hill and stand-up comedian Harry Hill. Woodyatt's team consisted of Michelle Collins, who previously played Cindy Beale in EastEnders, and Jeremy Spake, who became famous for appearing in the television docusoap Airport. There were eight rounds and Woodyatt's team won with 36 points to Richard's 16.

There have been three special editions of The Weakest Link relating to EastEnders, on 1 March 2001, 26 June 2008, and in February 2010 for EastEnders's 25th anniversary, which featured past and present EastEnders cast including Adam Woodyatt (Ian Beale), Larry Lamb (Archie Mitchell) and John Partridge (Christian Clarke). It was won by Laurie Brett, who plays Jane Beale.

An EastEnders-themed episode of Pointless Celebrities aired on 8 September 2018, featuring cast members Natalie Cassidy (Sonia Fowler), Dean Gaffney (Robbie Jackson), Perry Fenwick (Billy Mitchell), Emma Barton (Honey Mitchell), Lisa Hammond (Donna Yates), Luisa Bradshaw-White (Tina Carter), Jamie Borthwick (Jay Brown) and Madhav Sharma (Arshad Ahmed).

== See also ==
- List of EastEnders spin-off characters
