= Nick Cotton =

Fictional character from EastEnders

- EastEnders character
- Portrayed by: John Altman
- Duration: 1985–1991, 1993, 1998, 2000–2001, 2008–2009, 2014–2015
- First appearance: Episode 1 "Poor Old Reg"; 19 February 1985
- Last appearance: Episode 5017/5018 "Look Back in Anger"; 19 February 2015
- Created by: Julia Smith and Tony Holland
- Introduced by: Julia Smith (1985–1988); Michael Ferguson (1990–1991); Leonard Lewis (1993); Mike Hudson (1998); John Yorke (2000); Diederick Santer (2008); Dominic Treadwell-Collins (2014)
- Book appearances: The Baffled Heart; An Eye for Business
- Spin-off appearances: Return of Nick Cotton (2000)
- Crossover appearances: Noel’s House Party (1992); Bo Selecta (2004)
In-universe information
- Other names: Nasty Nick; Nicholas Charles Cotton
- Occupation: Handyman; Drug dealer; Waiter; Plumber; Con artist; Career criminal
- Father: Charlie Cotton
- Mother: Dot Cotton
- Half-brothers: Andrew Cotton; Tom "Rocky" Cotton
- Wife: Yvonne Cotton (backstory)
- Sons: Charlie Cotton; Ashley Cotton
- Daughters: Dotty Cotton
- Grandsons: Matthew Mitchell Cotton
- Aunts: Rose Cotton

Nick Cotton is a fictional character from the BBC soap opera EastEnders played by John Altman on a semi-regular basis from the soap's debut episode on 19 February 1985. He became well known for his tabloid nickname, "Nasty Nick". Altman has stated that his initial exit was due to producer Julia Smith demanding he was written out after he opposed a decision to make his character gay. Following Smith's departure, the character made numerous brief or more protracted stints until his onscreen death in February 2015, which was written to coincide with the 30th anniversary of EastEnders.

Nick's primary function was as an antagonist, a drug-user and a murderer. He was notably responsible for the death of Reg Cox (Johnnie Clayton), who was discovered unconscious in the first scene of the programme in 1985, and revealed in the following episode to have died. Nick's death was partly scripted as a re-enactment of Reg's death, as Nick died in the same spot where Reg had died, exactly 30 years prior. He was conceived by the show's creators, Tony Holland and Julia Smith. A late inclusion to the original cast line-up, Nick was included based on writer feedback to Holland and Smith's original script, which centred on Cox's murder, whose killer they had not originally intended to reveal. Nick was created to be the assailant and to provide the show with more dramatic storyline potential. During his time on the show, Nick embarked on multiple feuds with Phil (Steve McFadden) and Billy Mitchell (Perry Fenwick), Michelle (Susan Tully), and Mark Fowler (David Scarboro/Todd Carty), Lisa Fowler (Lucy Benjamin), Tony Carpenter (Oscar James), Ali Osman (Nedjet Salih), Pete Beale (Peter Dean), Kathy Beale (Gillian Taylforth), Clyde Tavernier (Steven Woodcock), Nigel Bates (Paul Bradley), Den Watts (Leslie Grantham), Eddie Skinner (Richard Vanstone), his father Charlie Cotton (Christopher Hancock) and Ronnie Mitchell (Samantha Womack).

Nick is used as an "out and out villain". It was suggested by executive producer Dominic Treadwell-Collins that unlike other soap characters who behaved badly and required a more nuanced characterisation and redemption, it was possible to use Nick as a complete "bad guy". A television critic for The Guardian suggested that, for this reason, the character's dastardly motives were rarely questioned by viewers, as his primary function is that of "an agent of chaos". It was also suggested that Nick's appearances on the show needed to be brief because the level of malevolence he portrays could not be sustained in a character over longer periods.

Nick's most prominent relationship is with his mother Dot Cotton (June Brown). It is portrayed as complex, dysfunctional and somewhat cyclical, with Nick perpetually entering his mother's life, her forgiving him for past misdemeanours (including an attempt to kill her to steal her bingo winnings), then being let down when Nick's true intentions are revealed, often ending in his banishment, albeit temporarily, before the cycle repeats. Nick's eventual demise in 2015 pays homage to this relationship, with Dot – finally realising the extent of Nick's villainous behaviour and accepting his inability to change – ultimately deciding to allow Nick to die, rather than seeking medical assistance after he has a fatal reaction to heroin, her motive being to let Jesus decide whether Nick should live or die.

== Creation ==
Nick Cotton was the twenty-fourth character invented by the creators of EastEnders, Tony Holland and Julia Smith. Nick was not part of Holland's and Smith's original vision for EastEnders, and his creation came about as an afterthought. The first episode of the series was to include the death of an elderly resident, Reg Cox, who had been brutally attacked in his home, and left to die. During the first writers' meeting, where the writers were introduced to the intended characters and early scripts, each independently wanted to know which character had killed Reg. However, Holland and Smith had never intended for the murderer to be unveiled. They had no idea who had killed Reg Cox, and they had felt that "the who" was not important. The fact that he was dead following an attack was the important issue, and Reg's murder was not intended to be solved, it was only there to tell the audience, from the outset, that Walford was a rough and tough place. The writers opposed this. They accused Holland of throwing away a great opportunity and suggested that a murder hunt would provide an array of dramatic possibilities that would captivate the audience. After deciding that all of the twenty-three original characters were incapable of committing the crime, Holland decided to invent an entirely new character, in the form of Nick Cotton. The original character outline for Nick read: "His image is exclusively macho. Vanishes for weeks on end. Mum doesn't ask questions... Unlike Den, Nick is a real crook. Worms his way into people's confidentiality and homes. From then on, lives on his wits. Waiting for the moment to strike; to nick the cash and disappear...Usually chooses his victims who, for one reason or another, are frightened to report him...Nick's a heroin addict". As Nick was only intended to be a semi-regular character, Julia Smith was not involved in his casting and the actor John Altman was chosen by the directors. However, she requested he was axed, after he refused to portray Nick having a gay relationship with Lofty Holloway (Tom Watt) because he thought it was out of character.

== Development and storylines ==
Nick has been described by EastEnders' executive producer Diederick Santer as "the show's premier villain". An EastEnders Revealed documentary chronicling the character's time on the show deemed him a liar, a thief and a murderer who "thrived on the pain and the misery of those near to him". Co-star Charlie Clements (Bradley Branning) has stated: "You think of soap bad guys, Nick Cotton is definitely up there with the best of them", while Leslie Grantham (Den Watts) opined that "There is no redeeming feature about Nick Cotton whatsoever". This assessment is shared by series story producer Dominic Treadwell-Collins, who has explained: "It's good to have an out and out villain. I think sometimes you can get a character and go 'Oh, they should have a good side as well, and maybe we should redeem them a little bit.' With Nick, it doesn't matter. You can go full pelt, foot-on-the-accelerator bad guy." John Altman has discussed the fact that he cannot remember his character ever once being nice, blaming Nick's unruliness on his father's absence during his childhood. Santer has discussed the "wonderfully dysfunctional mother-son relationship" Nick shares with his mother, Dot Cotton (June Brown), and her perpetual willingness to give Nick another chance, regardless of his history of wrongdoing. Santer explained: "There's that thing where you sort of dare to hope that someone's changed, which is really tragic. They've let you down a hundred times, and yet you still hope that the hundred and first time they'll have changed." Grantham has stated that Dot is the "one friend in [Nick's] life", while Treadwell-Collins has affirmed: "Dot's always going to forgive him. And that's the beauty of Nick and Dot." Concurring with this sentiment, Altman agreed: "No matter what he does, she'll forgive him. So did a lot of gangsters' mothers throughout history. Probably Al Capone's mother thought he was a sweet lad, you know."

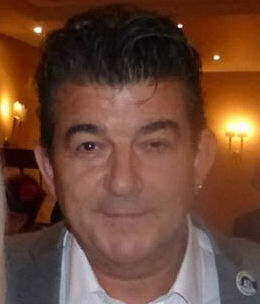
John Altman (pictured) first portrayed Nick in the serial's debut episode.

The debut episode of EastEnders began with the discovery of elderly resident Reg Cox (Johnnie Clayton) unconscious in his flat. Reg later dies and in later episodes it is revealed that he was murdered by Nick. Holland and Smith wanted to introduce the series in a dramatic fashion, and believed the Reg Cox storyline to be a good starting point, allowing various members of the community to be involved with or comment on the circumstances of the old man's murder. Santer has explained that Nick was established as a "kind of spitting, snarling beast right from the outset", with the end of the first episode seeing Nick granted EastEnders' first drum roll ending as he punched through the glass door window of The Queen Victoria pub after a fight with Ali Osman (Nejdet Salih). After a few weeks of the police investigation, prime suspect Nick left the Square after attempting to mug Ethel Skinner (Gretchen Franklin), and in April it was reported that he had been arrested. After Nick's mother, Dot, was introduced to the cast in July, she informed the audience that Nick had managed to get off on probation, and the following month, he returned to Albert Square. Upon his return, he broke into Dr. Harold Legg's (Leonard Fenton) surgery and came across Kathy Beale's (Gillian Taylforth) medical records, discovering she had a child at 14 years old. Nick threatens to reveal this to Kathy's husband, Pete (Peter Dean) unless she gives him regular payments. Kathy soon tells Pete the truth, resulting in him giving Nick a beating in the middle of the street. Following this, Den warns Nick to leave the square for good, with the exception of visiting Dot occasionally, or he will face fatal consequences.

Nick appears briefly throughout the next few years and eventually meets his father, Charlie (Christopher Hancock) in October 1987 when they both coincidentally turn up to visit Dot. Nick and Charlie make it clear to each other that they don't want each other around. Charlie discovers that Nick is hiding from some criminals after he stole from them and also discovers Nick is hiding from Graham Clark (Gary Webster), an old friend of Nick's who went to prison for Nick's crimes. Charlie lets Graham into the house to confront Nick, and forces him to leave, or else he will hand him over to the criminals he is hiding from.

In 1988, Nick ends up doing prison time for drug offences in Dickens Hill Prison where, coincidentally, Den is being held for arson. It is during this period that the mystery of Reg's murder is finally solved when Nick confessed to Den that he had been responsible. In 1989, Dot learns, through off-screen visits to Nick, that he has married a woman called Hazel (Virginia Fiol), and has a young daughter; Nick had avoided telling her beforehand due to his and Dot's strained relationship. Hazel tracked Dot down in May 1989 and visited her with the child, Dorothy Nicola; Dot was so pleased they visited that she pulled out of attending a Brownie march with Mo Butcher (Edna Doré) and Marge Green (Pat Coombs). This was later revealed to be a lie, and the baby turned out to be Hazel's niece.

Although Nick was only a semi-regular character, his intermittent appearances were always scripted to make a big impact on the show, as well as all the characters involved in his storylines. He reappeared and left several times during the first few years of the show, causing maximum havoc every time, and it wasn't long before the tabloids had begun to brand the character "Nasty Nick". Altman has commented: "I think they keep bringing Nick back because he's one of the characters on British TV that people just love to hate". This dislike of the character by the public was shared by the fictional residents of Walford, with Altman explaining: "Every time he comes back he gets shunned by one and all. It's like being the bad cowboy come riding into town - everybody puts down the shutters and locks up the bar."

The character's appearance was tailored to suit this unlikable, "nasty" image, with EastEnders series consultant Simon Ashdown commenting; "When he comes on, you know this guy is bad. He's got the black hair and the scowl and the leather jacket. He is like that, he is a Dickensian baddy." Frankie Fitzgerald, who played Nick's son Ashley Cotton from 2000 to 2001, agreed: "The look of Nasty Nick, you know, he was a bad guy. Even when he gets dressed up in a suit, he's still got the earring, he's still got the rings, he's still got the tattoo on his neck."

One of Nick's most notable returns to the series occurred in 1990. Nick returned to his mother's life with the claim that he was a born-again Christian, which happened to coincide with her £10,000 win on the bingo. EastEnders writer Sarah Phelps explained: "For Dot, the idea that Jesus had finally spoken to Nick, that was all her Christmases coming at once! Nick knew that. It was sort of obvious that Nick could be saying 'Jesus walks with me' and then just go out and kick somebody or nick their wallet." With the help of a fake priest, Nick managed to convince his mother of his newfound faith and then began a slow campaign to control her eating habits and poison her in order to claim her money. The episode which culminated the storyline, written by P.J. Hammond, was set solely in Dot's house and featured an unusually small cast composed of Nick, Dot, Charlie, Ethel and Alistair, the fake priest. At the last moment, in what Altman has called the "one time we saw a glimmer of Nick's good side", Nick backed out of his plan and stopped Dot from eating the poisoned meal he had intended to kill her with. Once again, Dot was left alone, broken-hearted at what her own son had been prepared to do to her.

Nick's heroin addiction (1991)

Nick was not away from Walford for long. In 1991, he returned with a heroin addiction but Dot initially shunned him and ignored his pleas for help. It was only after discovering Charlie had died that Nick was her only family left and was determined to reform him. Discussing the storyline, Altman has said: "I found the heroin addiction quite exhausting actually, because I grew a really thick beard and my hair was always really filthy. When I was shooting those scenes I met with a guy who was an addict, and he told me things that you go through, like you can't relax when you're trying to come off it. You can't sleep so you drink loads of alcohol to try and kill the pain. The clock barely seems to move. For me as an actor, they really let me go as far as I could on that. We had letters as well from people saying how it's put them off heroin for life, so I guess we did a good job." As the plot unfolded, Dot tried to curtail Nick's addiction by locking him in his room and forcing him to go cold turkey with the help of Pete. During this period, The Queen Victoria's landlord Eddie Royle (Michael Melia) was murdered. The murder was the key storyline of the show during the autumn of 1991. The episode in which Eddie was murdered was written by Tony McHale; it finished with a cliffhanger featuring Clyde Tavernier (Steven Woodcock) in the gardens standing over Eddie's body and holding a knife, which Nick witnessed from his bedroom window. Nick tells the police what he saw, leading to Clyde going on the run with the help of Michelle Fowler (Susan Tully).

Joe Wallace (Jason Rush) eventually came forward, saying he saw Nick out on the square on the night of Eddie's murder, having escaped his room and climbed down a drain pipe. Nick confesses to Dot that he was responsible but insists that it was an accident. Nick is subsequently arrested and charged with Eddie's murder and he stands trial in January 1993. A week's worth of episodes were devoted to the trial, and were all written by Tony Jordan. To present the story of Nick's trial, the programme-makers themselves had to review the evidence and watch the episodes leading up to the death of Eddie. In the end, although it was clear that Nick was responsible for stabbing Eddie, it was not clear that it was murder, and the jury returned a verdict of not guilty. Altman summarised: "Through having a really good defence and lying his head off once again, he got away with murder".

Nick was written out of the show, along with Dot, when June Brown (who plays Dot) decided to depart from the series in August 1993. Their departing storyline introduced his girlfriend, Zoe (Elizabeth Chadwick) and young son, Ashley (Rossi Higgins) to Dot, who was initially convinced that Zoe was attempting to con her, as she remembered the incident with Hazel several years before. Once Dot was convinced Nick was being truthful, however, she quickly grew close to Ashley, and the family moved to Gravesend together. This would be the last time Dot and Nick would be onscreen for several years until 1997, when June Brown was persuaded to reprise her role as Dot.

Upon her return, Dot explained that Nick had been arrested yet again off-screen for drugs possession, and that Zoe and Ashley had moved away, tired of his criminal acts. Shortly after her return, she was informed by police that Nick had escaped prison with his cellmate, Damion Spinks. Damion comes looking for Dot, telling her that Nick cheated him out of money. He keeps her hostage overnight and soon leaves after finding her money. The following day, the police reveal that Damion is in intensive care, put there by Nick.

John Altman reprised his role as Nick after a five-year absence in March 1998. Nigel Bates (Paul Bradley) discovers Nick spying on Dot's house late at night and after telling him to stay away, Nick warns Nigel that he will be back. Nick returns a few weeks later, after Dot discovers him hiding in her house. Nick tells Dot that he is dying of AIDS, caused by his heroin addiction, which she disbelieves at first but is later convinced. Nick reveals that he is planning an armed robbery to pay for his medication. Not wanting Nick to go through with it, Dot decides to arrange the money for Nick. Dot later visits Mark Fowler (Todd Carty) and asks if he has heard of the drugs in question, which Mark denies. Dot then looks up the drug on Clare Bates' (Gemma Bissix) computer and discovers that the drugs are simply sleeping pills. Realising Nick has been lying about his illness all along, Dot calls the police before confronting him, having him rearrested and sent back to prison.

In October 2000, a special 'soap-bubble' titled Return of Nick Cotton aired. The episode centred on Nick's release from prison, his reconciliation with his son, and even featured Nick's father Charlie, making a brief cameo appearance as a ghost almost a decade after his character was killed off. The episode paved the way for Nick's subsequent return to Walford, where he reignited an old feud with Mark Fowler after he discovered Nick was supplying his younger brother Martin Fowler (James Alexandrou) with ecstasy. On New Year's Day 2001, Mark spikes Nick's drink and lures him to the top of the viaduct in Bridge Street and watches as an intoxicated Nick falls, severely crippling himself. Following this, Nick orders Ashley to set fire to Mark's house but he cannot go through with it and leaves Walford after Nick disowns him. Following this, Nick temporarily departs to a spinal unit in February 2001.

Mark gets his revenge on Nick

After three months away, he returned in May 2001; he was able to walk, but still needed crutches. This comeback was going to be even shorter than his previous one, and followed by a much longer absence from the show. Determined to continue the feud with Mark, Nick starts making threats to Mark's pregnant girlfriend Lisa Shaw (Lucy Benjamin) and soon causes the death of Ashley after sabotaging the brakes on Mark's motorbike, only for Ashley to steal and crash it. Following Ashley's death, Dot overhears an argument between Nick and Mark and realises that Nick had tampered with the brakes on Mark's motorbike. After Ashley's funeral, Dot banishes Nick from her life and tells him to leave and never return, as she would never be able to forgive him.

In September 2004, Dot wrote a card to Nick letting him know that she had kidney cancer on the day she was going to have her cancer operation at the hospital, the reason why Dot needed to reach out to him in a card, despite that Dot disowned him three years previous due to the fall out of his son Ashley's death, and also despite everything that happened between them both, it was because at a time like this, there were things that Dot wanted Nick to know, just in case if her cancer operation went wrong, Dot was letting Nick know that she was thinking of him, and didn't mean anything by not telling him about her cancer treatment before hand, which this eventually ended up leading up to Nick getting back in contact with Dot two years later, when he had his own cancer in 2006.

However, Santer explained: "There will always be a way back to Dot for Nick", a position supported by EastEnders writer James Payne, who stated: "[Dot] believes, I think, deep down, that he has the potential for change, that he can be a good boy. I think that she'll keep wishing that." The first steps towards reconciliation were made in 2006 when Jim Branning (John Bardon) received a phone call from Nick who was in a prison hospital with cancer. Jim and his grandson, Bradley (Charlie Clements) initially kept this a secret from Dot, but Bradley told his girlfriend, Stacey Slater (Lacey Turner), who let it slip to Dot. Dot went to visit Nick, but when he was cleared of his cancer, he refused to let Dot see him.

"Nick Cotton is an EastEnders legend. His complex relationship with Dot, his criminal tendencies, and his addiction to heroin, violence, and everything else that's bad have made him one of the show's best-remembered and best-loved villains. We're very excited that he - and the talented John Altman who plays him - will be returning to the Square."

— Executive producer Diederick Santer on Nick's 2008 return to EastEnders.

On 2 October 2008 it was reported that Nick would return to EastEnders on Christmas Day that year after more than seven years away. Executive producer Diederick Santer spoke of his excitement at Nick's return, hailing the character as an "EastEnders legend" and "one of the show's best-remembered and best-loved villains". Altman stated: "After an absence of seven years, I am thrilled to return to Albert Square. The BBC have always given me great storylines as Nick Cotton and I look forward to seeing if Nick will once again spread fear and loathing throughout the Square!" June Brown revealed that she had been asking producers to bring Altman back to the soap for six or seven years, as the two of them shared such a good working relationship. After spending time in Walsall, Cotton returned; walking normally again, he was accompanied by his seven-year-old daughter, Dotty (Molly Conlin). He explained that he had met Dotty's mother Sandy Gibson (Caroline Pegg) while living in a squat, and that she was an alcoholic who had recently died, leaving him with custody of Dotty. Altman explained: "Nick needed something, because I think if he didn't have little Dotty, for him to walk through that door, she would just have treated him as a complete outcast." The actor described other changes to his character since his last appearance, detailing how he had become a plumber, begun dressing more smartly, stopped gelling his hair back and no longer wore an earring.

Although suspicious to begin with, Dot accepted them both into her home, believing that Nick truly had changed this time. Asked whether Nick really was a reformed character, Altman remained ambiguous: "Nick's back, he's got a cute little daughter. He's become a plumber, he's a changed man. ...Or is he?" As the storyline progressed, Nick's true agenda was revealed when he blackmailed his mother into giving him money for custody of Dotty. In a further plot twist, it was revealed to the audience in 2009, that Dotty (real name Kirsty) was colluding with her father all along. In the storyline, Dotty suggested killing Dot for her life insurrance policy. Nick leaves following this, allowing Dotty to work on Dot. He returns three months later, whereupon they begin their plan to convince Dot and her friends that she is suffering with dementia, Nick's aim being to kill Dot and blame her death on her deteriorating mental state.

During Nick's brief stay in the square, he overheard Billy Mitchell (Perry Fenwick) telling Dot how he let Jase Dyer (Stephen Lord) die and Nick blackmailed Billy by demanding regular payments or he would tell Jase's son Jay Brown (Jamie Borthwick) what Billy did. When Billy's cousin, Phil Mitchell (Steve McFadden), found out about this, he led Nick into the barrel store of The Queen Victoria public house, where he beats him up and ties him to a chair. Phil gave Billy the opportunity to scare Nick off and end this, however, Billy let him go and told Jay the truth himself. The plot with his own daughter to kill his beloved mother climaxes on-screen in June 2009: Nick's plan goes awry after Dotty has a change of heart and ultimately rescues her grandmother from being poisoned, instead drugging Nick. This leads to a series of events whereby Nick, in a bid to escape once his plan has been exposed, holds various members of the community hostage in the café and an accidental fire is started after Heather Trott (Cheryl Fergison) pushes Nick into the chip pan. The hostages manage to escape due to a fight between Nick and Ryan Malloy (Neil McDermott), who was one of the hostages. This results in an explosion at the café with Nick and Bradley Branning inside. The storyline marked Altman's departure from the show once again. His departing episode was scripted as a cliffhanger, as it was not revealed whether Nick had survived the explosion at the end of the episode. However, in the following episode, on 4 June 2009, Nick is shown to survive the explosion and Bradley is hospitalised with injuries to his eye. Nick departs after once again being disowned by Dot. Dotty is left in Dot's care despite Nick explaining to his mother that Dotty is evil.

In January 2014, Dot's lodger Poppy Meadow (Rachel Bright) receives a phone call from Nick, who wants to speak to Dot. After being told by Sharon Rickman (Letitia Dean) that Nick is bad news, she refuses to let him talk to her. Two months later, Dot is told by the police that Nick has died of respiratory failure from a heroin overdose the previous week. One of the police officers who breaks the news to Dot is Nick's son Charlie Cotton (Declan Bennett). Charlie explains that he was conceived from a brief marriage Nick had with his mother Yvonne (Pauline McLynn) back in the 1980s. During the funeral, Charlie and undertaker Les Coker (Roger Sloman) prevent Dot from looking in the coffin. Dot is suspicious and invites Yvonne to tell the truth and she assures Dot that Charlie is her grandson. A few weeks later, Carol Jackson (Lindsey Coulson) asks Charlie for advice, when he leaves his phone at her house, she answers a call and discovers that Nick is still alive. Following this, it is revealed that Charlie has been impersonating a police officer and is actually a caretaker at a care home where Yvonne works. Charlie leaves work to find his car windows have been smashed, with a message from Nick, confirming he'd done it.

"After a five year break, I'm very pleased and much looking forward to returning to EastEnders. With the promise of some hard-hitting and gritty storylines, I'm sure the residents of Albert Square will be none too pleased to see Nick Cotton back on the streets of Walford. I'm also looking forward to working alongside Declan Bennett and Pauline McLynn and of course, being reunited and working once again with my 'dear old Ma,' the wonderful June Brown."

— John Altman on Nick's 2014 return to EastEnders.

In October 2014, Nick re-appears in Albert Square, seven months after his faked death. Executive producer Dominic Treadwell-Collins promised to deliver the "Ultimate Nasty Nick" storyline and it would be the Nick story to end all Nick stories. Charlie and his fiancé Ronnie Mitchell (Samantha Womack) are horrified to find Nick in Dot's house. Nick blackmails them for £10,000 by the end of the day, or he will reveal to Dot that he is alive. Charlie asks Phil for a loan, he agrees but unbeknown to Charlie, he gives him a bag full of paper and when Charlie gives it to Nick he finds out there is no money. On Halloween night, Charlie reveals to Dot that Nick is alive, he goes to find him but while he is gone, Dot finds him in her house. Nick reveals that he was involved in a robbery at a jewellery shop and Charlie convinced him to fake his death. Dot agrees to hide Nick until they can raise enough money for him to leave. During this time, Dot is once again manipulated by Nick and starts to become happy that he is there, believing she can finally have a mother-son relationship with him. Fed up being stuck in Dot's house, Nick decides to go outside but is spotted by Ian Beale (Adam Woodyatt), who tells Phil and Sharon that Nick is alive. Phil goes round to Dot's house to attack Nick but is stopped by Ronnie. Ronnie tries to bribe Nick to leave by stealing £100,000 of Phil's money but he returns for Charlie and Ronnie's wedding. Having overheard Ronnie and Phil talking about killing him to get rid of him once and for all, Nick decides to cut the brakes on Ronnie's car. After she goes into labour at the wedding reception, Ronnie, Charlie and her sister Roxy Mitchell (Rita Simons) are involved in a car accident which later kills Emma Summerhayes (Anna Acton), while Ronnie is left in a coma. Yvonne discovers that Nick cut the brakes of the car but he convinces her to frame Phil by planting the oily rag in his coat pocket. Yvonne tells Charlie what Nick has done but he does not believe her until he catches Nick with some of the money Ronnie used to bribe him. Then Nick implicates Yvonne in Ronnie's accident so Charlie tells them both to leave. Dot hides Nick in the derelict house next door and obtains heroin for Nick. Dot's lodger Fatboy (Ricky Norwood) finds out and urges her to stop so when she sees Nick she urges him to confess to the police about framing Phil for Ronnie's sake but he says he does not care about Ronnie, telling her he hopes she rots. Later, Dot finds Nick unconscious but he regains consciousness briefly and reveals to Dot that he was responsible for Reg Cox's death in 1985. Dot decides not to call an ambulance and instead lets fate decide if Nick should survive. Dot accepts that she is to blame for Nick becoming a monster as she saw what he was turning into but turned a blind eye to it in the vain hope he'd change. In his final moments, Nick sincerely apologises for everything he put Dot through and asks for forgiveness. Dot refuses and tells him to ask Jesus instead, seconds before Nick dies in her arms, in the same location that Reg was discovered thirty years prior. Dot confesses to letting Nick die to Charlie who plans to get rid of Nick's body with Les Coker's help to save Dot from going to prison.

In the live episode aired on 19 February 2015 to coincide with the show's 30th anniversary, the very first scene from the show's first episode was recreated. Stacey, Martin and Kush Kazemi (Davood Ghadami) find Nick's body in the same way Den, Ali and Arthur Fowler (Bill Treacher) found Reg Cox thirty years earlier. Dot confesses to killing Nick and is taken away by police. His body is removed from the house the following day. Three months later, Dot receives 14 months in prison for Nick's manslaughter but she is later released after four months. Nick's funeral takes place in June 2015 with only Charlie, Roxy and his grandson, Matthew in attendance.

In 2021, nearly eight years after Nick's death, it is revealed that Dotty (now played by Milly Zero) is not his daughter and that her father is Nick's half-brother, Tom "Rocky" Cotton (Brian Conley). However, in 2022, it is revealed that this is a lie and that Nick is indeed Dotty's father.

Altman revealed that in the early/mid 80's, producers were told to 'write him out' of the show by executive producer and show creator Julia Smith after he opposed a decision to make his character gay along with fellow character Lofty Holloway.

== Reception ==
Nick Cotton has become one of EastEnders' most renowned villains. His 'nastiness' was voted the 25th "Greatest Soap Moment" in a Five poll in 2004, and he has also been voted the 4th most villainous television character in a Channel 4 poll. The Guardian columnist Charlie Brooker has denied Nick's villainous characterisation, however, writing: "The man simply isn't menacing; he's half as terrifying as an Argos catalogue. Whereas [Coronation Street villain] Jez Quigley (Lee Boardman) looked as though he'd enjoy riding an onyx stallion through a field full of groaning, recently-impaled victims before galloping home to bathe in the blood of the fallen, Nick Cotton merely looks like he might, at a push, dispute the price of a dented tin of custard with a supermarket checkout girl while you wait behind him, wondering when he last washed his hair." The Times's Fiona McCade satirised the character when Altman appeared on the children's TV show Balamory, advising parents to: "be prepared to cover your little ones' eyes as the bad boy of soap strides into the colourful, fictional paradise, no doubt goosing Miss Hoolie, upsetting PC Plum and making Josie jump. I also fear for the safety of Archie, the chubby, cheerful posh boy who wears a pink kilt and lives alone in a big pink castle. With Nick in town, he doesn't stand a chance." In February 2025, Radio Times ranked Nick as the 6th best EastEnders villain, with Laura Denby calling him a "blight on the life" of Dot, and wrote that, as Nick was the show's first villain, "Altman's work certainly stands the test of time".

John Altman was nominated for "Villain of the Year" at the 2015 British Soap Awards, but lost out to Hollyoaks actor, Jeremy Sheffield, who portrays Patrick Blake.

== See also ==
- List of soap opera villains
