= Ashley Cotton =

Fictional character from the BBC soap opera EastEnders

- EastEnders character
- Frankie Fitzgerald as Ashley Cotton (2000)
- Portrayed by: Rossi Higgins (1993); Frankie Fitzgerald (2000–2001)
- Duration: 1993, 2000–2001
- First appearance: Episode 886; 29 July 1993
- Last appearance: Episode 2122; 14 June 2001
- Introduced by: Leonard Lewis (1993); John Yorke (2000)
- Spin-off appearances: Return of Nick Cotton (2000)
In-universe information
- Other names: Ashley Nicholas Cotton
- Father: Nick Cotton
- Mother: Zoe Newton
- Half-brothers: Charlie Cotton
- Half-sisters: Dotty Cotton
- Grandfathers: Charlie Cotton
- Grandmothers: Dot Cotton
- Uncles: Eddie Newton; Andrew Cotton; Tom "Rocky" Cotton

Ashley Cotton is a fictional character from the BBC soap opera EastEnders, the son of Zoe Cotton (Elizabeth Chadwick/Tara Ellis) and established character Nick Cotton (John Altman) and the grandson of Dot Cotton (June Brown). He was played by Rossi Higgins in 1993, and then by Frankie Fitzgerald from 2000 to 2001.

== Casting ==
Writing for The People in July 2000, Sharon Marshall revealed Ashley would be returning to EastEnders now played by Frankie Fitzgerald. Fitzgerald was appearing in a variety show when he was spotted by a talent scout who suggested he send some photos to the BBC's casting department. A few months later, Fitzgerald was asked to audition for the role of Ashley. While on his way home from the audition, Fitzgerald was told he had won the part. Marshall revealed Fitzgerald was hired after producers noted his resemblance to John Altman, who plays his on screen father, Nick. An EastEnders spokesperson said "They could easily be father and son. They've got the same brooding dark-haired looks." Marshall said Fitzgerald was set to "steal the show - as well as a few young Walford hearts" as Ashley. She also stated the character would be a chip off the old block, spelling trouble for the residents of Albert Square. Of his casting, Fitzgerald said "I am thrilled and honoured to be playing Nick Cotton's son and can't wait to work with John. People keep asking me what the storylines are but I am as eager as everyone to know." Fitzgerald made his debut as Ashley on 27 July 2000.

== Development ==
Ashley's first scene back in Albert Square saw him stealing pineapples from the fruit and veg stall, showing the character was similar to his father. In September 2000, Martyn Leek of the Sunday Mercury reported Nick Cotton would be returning to EastEnders to find his son. Nick's return scenes were filmed in Birmingham, with a BBC spokesperson saying "We were filming in Moseley and Winson Green all week. Nick is trying to get his son Ashley back on the straight and narrow so it is a bit of a turnaround from how he used to be." Lisa Perrott, the publicist for EastEnders said Birmingham was chosen as they needed to film scenes away from the Albert Square setting and the location suited the storyline. Ashley and Nick meet during a special spin-off episode, entitled Return of Nick Cotton, which was broadcast on 1 October 2000. Nick comes face to face with Ashley after he catches him trying to steal his car. Sue Smith of Daily Mirror said "A chip off the old block, their reunion is bound to wreak havoc."

In June 2001, Fitzgerald was axed from EastEnders and his character died following a motorbike accident. Fitzgerald told Ian Woodward of the Daily Mirror that he was shocked and disappointed when he learned he was being axed from the show. The actor said "I was dumbstruck. I thought I was going to be in Albert Square for a long, long time." Fitzgerald found filming Ashley's deaths scenes difficult and he said he thought about death a lot before they filmed his last scene. He explained "I went over and over in my mind the whole aspect of dying. Even though I knew it was pretend time, it had a big impact on me. It freaked me out. I felt utterly drained."

== Storylines ==
=== 1993 ===
Ashley first appears after his mother Zoe (Elizabeth Chadwick) arrives in Walford to inform his grandmother, Dot (June Brown) of his existence. Dot goes to meet 9-year-old Ashley where he becomes close to his grandmother. Dot is eventually persuaded to leave Walford to live with Zoe, Ashley and her son Nick (John Altman) in Gravesend.

Dot leaves Gravesend and returns to Walford in 1997 without Ashley or his parents and reveals that Ashley and Zoe have moved to London to get away from Nick, after he was sent to prison for drug offences.

=== 2000–2001 ===
Ashley (now played by Frankie Fitzgerald) returns to the square briefly in July 2000 to visit Dot for a few days. It is obvious he has taken after his father when he gets up to mischief and constantly butts heads with Martin Fowler (James Alexandrou) when they share a room. Nick is later released from prison and reunites with Ashley and Zoe (now played by Tara Ellis) in the special spin-off episode titled "Return of Nick Cotton". Ashley leaves to go with Nick despite Zoe's reluctance so he and Nick get into a stolen car and decide to travel before returning to Walford. When they return to Walford and settle in with Dot, Ashley is under the influence of his villainous father Nick by taking drugs and gets involved in robberies with Nick. After Nick falls off some scaffolding, due to Mark Fowler (Todd Carty) spiking his drink, he orders Ashley to set fire to Mark's house, but Ashley cannot go through with it and leaves after Nick disowns him. Nick contacts Ashley a few months later and they reconcile. Their bond resumes until a fateful summer evening in June 2001 when Ashley steals Mark's motorbike after an argument with him in The Queen Vic, unaware that Nick had cut the bike's brakes the previous night in hope of killing Mark. While driving the motorbike through the Square, he swerves to avoid a pedestrian after being unable to apply the brakes, resulting in Ashley being ejected from the motorbike and into the walls of the laundrette, killing him instantly. After his funeral, Dot discovers Nick was responsible for cutting the brakes to the motorbike after overhearing an argument between him and Mark, resulting in her banishing Nick from her life due to this.

== Reception ==
In March 2001, a major storyline saw Phil Mitchell (Steve McFadden) shot by unknown assailant. William Hill took bets on who shot Phil and Ashley came third with the odds of 13–2. Shortly before the character's departure, the Daily Mirror's Ian Woodward said Ashley had clearly become "one of the more popular teenagers in EastEnders."
