= John Altman (actor) =

English actor and singer (born 1952)

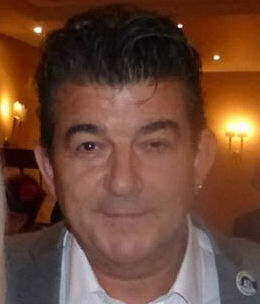
- Altman in 2014
- Born: John Clarkson Stewart; 2 March 1952 (age 74); Reading, Berkshire, England
- Occupations: Actor and singer
- Years active: 1976–present
- Notable work: See below
- Television: EastEnders (1985–1991, 1993, 1998, 2000–2001, 2008–2009, 2014–2015)
- Spouse: Bridget Poodhun (m. 1986; div. 1997)
- Children: 1

John Clarkson Stewart (born 2 March 1952), known as John Altman, is an English actor and singer. He was among the original cast members of the BBC soap opera EastEnders, playing Nick Cotton, appearing in the first episode in February 1985 and remaining on the show as a recurring character. His character was killed off in the 30th anniversary episode of the show which aired in February 2015. Altman has also appeared in several films, television series and stage productions. In 2010, he became the new frontman of the band Heavy Metal Kids following the death of former frontman Gary Holton in 1985.

== Early life ==
Altman was born in Reading, Berkshire, elder son of Cecil Clarkson Stewart (1921–1995), a first-class clerk at the Bank of England, and Tina Florence (1920–2016), daughter of actor Johnnie Schofield. He and his younger brother William were raised in Herne Bay, Kent.

== Career ==
Altman made his acting debut with a minor part in the 1979 film The First Great Train Robbery. That same year, he portrayed musician George Harrison in the biographical television film Birth of the Beatles. He made brief appearances in several other films including Quadrophenia (1979), An American Werewolf in London (1981) and Memoirs of a Survivor (1981). In 1980, Altman worked as a model in creating prototypes of the Hawkmen that appear in the Dino De Laurentiis–produced film, Flash Gordon but did not appear in the film itself. In 1982, Altman played the role of a Royal Navy rating alongside Timothy Spall in the Channel 4 film Remembrance. Altman also featured in a 1982 short public information film, "Stupid Git", part of the British government's campaign against drink-driving.

In 1985, he began appearing as Nick Cotton in the new BBC television soap opera EastEnders, appearing in the first episode on 19 February that year. Altman was axed from the show the following year after executive producer Julia Smith told writers to "write him out" of the show after he opposed a decision to make his character gay.After Julia Smith left the show as a producer, he went on to make recurring appearances on the show over a span of nearly 30 years. He has had a major role in many famous storylines in the show including the murders of Reg Cox (whose body was found in the first episode) and Eddie Royle, his attempt to kill his own mother by poisoning her, and his various feuds with characters including Pete Beale, Den Watts and Mark Fowler. He also contributed towards the death of his own son Ashley by sabotaging a motorbike, which Ashley ended up stealing and crashing. His character was also given his own television spin-off episode titled Return of Nick Cotton which completely centred around his character and aired in October 2000.

His character was killed off in the episode that aired on 13 February 2015 and he made his final appearance as a corpse in the episode that marked the 30th anniversary of the show on 19 February 2015. His body was found in the same way as his victim Reg Cox was found in the first episode 30 years earlier. A year earlier, his character's death had been announced in the show, only for it to emerge within a few months that Nick had faked his own death.

In 1991, he played Thomas De Quincey in Malcolm McLaren's The Ghosts of Oxford Street in which he appeared outside a purported subterranean "Boots Apothecary", the origin of an urban myth that there is a parallel abandoned Victorian shopping street "under" Oxford Street, London. This was actually the under-pavement storage vaults of 20–22 Stratford Place.

Away from television, he also appeared in an adult pantomime, which released on video in 1994 titled Pussy in Boots. In the pantomime he appeared alongside fellow EastEnders cast members Mike Reid and Barbara Windsor. In 2001 he won the Rear of the Year Award alongside Claire Sweeney. In the same year, he also performed in the Leiber and Stoller tribute evening at the Hammersmith Apollo, singing "Trouble", originally performed by Elvis Presley.

In 2002, he toured around the UK playing Billy Flynn in the long-running musical Chicago. He also appeared in the John Godber written stage play Bouncers opposite fellow soap actor Nigel Pivaro, who is best known for playing a similar style of character, Terry Duckworth in Coronation Street. Both Terry and Nick are the sons of long-running established characters, both are estranged from their mothers, both have committed criminal acts and both have made sporadic appearances on their respective shows.

In 2004, he made an appearance in the comedy sketch series Bo' Selecta! as his EastEnders character. In 2006, Altman was set to appear in an upcoming British film called It's Been Real, the trailer can be seen on YouTube. It still has yet to be released in cinemas. Altman also appeared on the 18 July 2009 episode of Totally Saturday by climbing out of the boot of a car.

In August 2010, he joined a band called Heavy Metal Kids. From late 2010, until early 2011, Altman appeared in adverts for Daz along with actors (Michael Starke and Amanda Barrie), from rival soap opera Coronation Street. In February 2011, he appeared on Live from Studio Five. In January 2012, he appeared as one of the first five couples in the third series of Celebrity Coach Trip partnering fellow actor Derek Martin.

In February 2015, he appeared as a guest on The Graham Norton Show as part of an EastEnders special episode alongside June Brown, Adam Woodyatt, Letitia Dean, Danny Dyer, Kellie Bright, Shane Richie, Jessie Wallace and Pam St. Clement.

In February 2017, he appeared in June Brown at 90 – A Walford Legend, a special BBC documentary that aired to celebrate June Brown's 90th birthday.

In April 2020, he appeared with 7 other celebrities in the 4th series of the BBC travel documentary series The Real Marigold Hotel, filmed in Pondicherry, India.

In July 2025, he appeared in a show about his life onboard the cruise ship MSC Virtuosa.

== Personal life ==
In 1986, Altman married Bridgette Poodhun. They divorced in 1997. He has one daughter.

Altman released his autobiography, In the Nick of Time, which was published on 30 June 2016.

== Filmography ==
=== Films ===
Year	Film	Role	Notes
TBA	I am Khama	Rev. William Willoughby (voice)	Pre-production
TBA	1066	Earl Leofric	pre-production
2020	Sphere of Fear 2	Demon Football (voice)	
2019	Lucas and Albert	Charlie	
2017	Is This Now	Johnny	
2016	Essex Vendetta	Marine Police Officer	
2016	Perfect Break	Michael	
2015	My Lonely Me	Tom	
2009	Photo Shoot	Wayne Wilson	
2006	The Insane	John Vincent Narration	Short Film
2006	1969	Matt	Short Film
2005	Hell to Pay	Policeman	
2005	It Could Be You	Tony Mantana	
1994	To Die For	Dogger	
1993	The Higher Mortals	Mr. Thomas	
1983	Return of the Jedi	Rebel Pilot	Uncredited
1982	Remembrance	Steve	
1981	Memoirs of a Survivor	Gerald's Courtier	
1981	An American Werewolf in London	Assorted Police	
1979	Birth of the Beatles	George Harrison	
1979	Quadrophenia	John	
1979	The First Great Train Robbery	First Pickpocket	

=== TV ===
Year	TV Show	Role	Notes
2022	Good Morning Britain	Himself	Paying tribute to June Brown
2020	The Real Marigold Hotel	Himself	
2017	June Brown at 90 – A Walford Legend	Himself	One Off Special Documentary
2015	The British Soap Awards 2015	Himself	
2015	The Graham Norton Show	Himself	1 episode
2014–2016	Lorraine	Himself	2 Episodes: 15 December 2014/30 June 2016
2012	Pointless Celebrities	Himself	1 episode (S03E03)
2012	Celebrity Coach Trip	Himself	
2011	Live from Studio Five	Himself	1 episode
2010	Fern Britton Meets	Himself	1 episode : June Brown
2010	The Wright Stuff	Himself – Guest Panelist	1 episode: Episode No.14.52
2010	EastEnders: The Murders of Lucas Johnson	Himself	One Off Special Documentary
2010	Loose Women	Himself	1 episode: Episode No.14.141
2010	EastEnders: The Greatest Cliffhangers	Himself	3 episodes
2007–2010	The Weakest Link	Himself	2 episodes: Goodies and Baddies/'EastEnders' Special 3
2009	The Alan Titchmarsh Show	Himself	1 episode
2009	Hole in the Wall	Himself	1 episode
2009	Totally Saturday	Himself	1 episode
2009	The British Soap Awards 2009	Himself	
2009	The Podge and Rodge Show	Himself	1 episode
2008	EastEnders: Comebacks	Himself	One Off Special Documentary
2008	GMTV	Himself	1 episode
2008	EastEnders: Whodunnits	Himself	One Off Special Documentary
2007	No. 1 Soap Fan	Himself	
2007	Granada Reports	Himself	1 episode
2007	Soapstar Superchef	Himself	2 episodes
2005	Balamory	Mick Morris	1 episode : The Game Show
2004	100 Greatest Christmas Moments	Himself	TV documentary
2004	Win, Lose or Draw Late	Himself	2 episodes
2004	Simply the Best	Himself	1 episode: Episode No.1.5
2004	Celebrity Fear Factor UK	Himself	1 episode: Episode No.1.1
2004	Bo' Selecta	Nick Cotton	1 episode: Episode No.3.4
2003	EastEnders: Christmas Party	Himself	TV film
2003	Loose Lips	Himself	1 episode
2002	Kelly	Himself	1 episode
2002	Top Ten	Himself	1 episode: Soap Queens
2001	Liquid News	Himself	1 episode
2000	EastEnders: The Return of Nick Cotton	Nick Cotton	(TV film)
1998	Lenny Goes to Town	Unknown Role	1 episode : Cambridge
1997	Adam's Family Tree	Angus the Caveman	1 episode: I'm the Urban Caveman
1996	Chef!	Pianist	1 episode : Lessons in Talking
1996	The Famous Five	Simmy	1 episode: Five Fall into Adventure
1996	Cold Lazarus	Restaurant Policeman	1 episode: Episode No.1.1
1995–1996	Blackhearts in Battersea	Midwink	6 episodes
1994	Pussy in Boots	The Wicked Giant	TV: Mike Reid Live
1992	Noel's House Party	Nick Cotton	1 episode: Episode No.1.13
1991	The Ghosts of Oxford Street	Thomas De Quincey	TV
1991	The Adventures of Scragtag and Toddles, Ace Detectives	Unknown Role	TV series
1990	The Paradise Club	Eddie	1 episode: Rock and Roll Roulette
1985–2015	EastEnders	Nick Cotton	Series regular, 1985–1991, 1993, 1998, 2000–2001, 2008–2009, 2014–2015 (277 episodes)
1984	Minder	Cabbie	1 episode: The Car Lot Baggers
1983	Pictures	Lance Repton	1 episode: Episode No.1.1
1982	The New Adventures of Lucky Jim	Vic Slater	1 episode: The Apartment
1982	Play for Today	Young man on tube	1 episode: Life After Death
