= Horns and Halos (film) =

2002 American documentary film

- Directed by: Suki Hawley; Michael Galinsky
- Written by: Suki Hawley (screenplay)
- Release date: 2002
- Running time: 90 minutes
- Country: United States
- Language: English

Horns and Halos is a 2002 documentary film directed by Suki Hawley and Michael Galinsky. The film is primarily about the difficult road the author (James Hatfield) and publisher (Sander Hicks at Soft Skull Press) travelled to bring Fortunate Son, a controversial biography of George W. Bush to bookshelves again. The film began when the filmmakers got a press release saying that Sander Hicks would be republishing the discredited bio. They followed the process of trying to bring the book back to the shelves. After seeing the film at the Rotterdam Film Festival, Matthew Tempest wrote in the Guardian, "With stunning revelations of presidential misdeeds, and the Watergate-style forces at hand to see the book is discredited, this documentary is a rolling masterclass on the disturbing complicity of media, money and mendacity."

The final day of shooting on the documentary followed Sander Hicks as he moved out of the basement he had squatted as an office of his publishing company. The move out date was Sept 10, 2001. The film had its first screening at the Rotterdam Film Festival in February 2002. It played a number of small festivals and was then invited to play at the Toronto Film Festival. The filmmakers self-distributed the film getting it qualified for Oscar consideration and it was shortlisted for that award. It played theatrically in over 25 cities in the US.
