= Gary Hailes =

British actor

- Born: 4 November 1965 (age 60); London, England
- Occupation: Actor
- Notable work: EastEnders

Gary Hailes (born 4 November 1965) is a British actor from London. He played Barry Clark in EastEnders regularly from 1986 until 1989.

He started acting after attending the Anna Scher Children's Theatre in Islington in 1978.

Hailes attended Holloway School.

== Early career ==
During the 1980s he appeared in "Woodentop", and starred in several television series, including Sorry!, The Witches and the Grinnygog, Nobody's Hero and Grange Hill.

== EastEnders ==
Hailes joined the BBC soap opera EastEnders, playing Barry Clark from 1986 to 1989. He originally auditioned for the role of Mark Fowler when the series began in 1985, but the role went to David Scarboro instead. Hailes' character was notable for being one half of the soap's first gay couple, introduced as the partner of the yuppie graphic designer, Colin Russell (played by Michael Cashman).

In 1987, Hailes' character Barry Clark caused a great deal of controversy after EastEnders screened the first male-to-male kiss on a UK, prime-time soap. The kiss prompted a multitude of complaints from angry viewers and a backlash from the right-wing press. Despite the fact that Hailes is heterosexual, he suffered from severe homophobia because of the homosexual role he played in EastEnders. He was attacked several times by members of the public, which included being assaulted in a supermarket by a disapproving woman and strangled by a man at a petrol station. Even after he left the show he lost a job as a children's television presenter because of the so-called "gay tag".

Although he left EastEnders in 1989 he returned in 2022 to reprise his role as Barry.

== Later work ==
Over the years he has appeared in films such as The Killing Zone (1999), Murder with Mirrors, Waiting for a Killer, Small Time Obsession and 60 Seconds to Die, amongst others. Television appearances include ITV police drama The Bill (2001–02), Horizon, Luther and Casualty.

Theatre appearances include Strip Poker, Doctor on the Boil, Gollocks and numerous pantomimes. He has also performed several plays for BBC radio and voice-overs.

In the late 1990s, Hailes passed the London knowledge and for a while drove a London taxi. In addition to his work as an actor, Hailes also works as a funeral celebrant.

Hailes is involved with the worldwide Star Wars costuming group, 501st Legion. He was Commanding Officer of the UK Garrison until 2024. Hailes spends much of his time traveling the country helping to raise money for charities. Hailes, along with five other members of the 501st Legion, appeared as a Stormtrooper in Star Wars: The Force Awakens.
