= Battle for Brooklyn =

- Directed by: Michael Galinsky; Suki Hawley
- Produced by: Michael Galinsky; Suki Hawley; David Beilinson
- Cinematography: Michael Galinsky
- Music by: David Reid, Derek Bermel, Tristeza, DJ Angola
- Production company: RUMUR. Inc with support from the Moving Picture Institute
- Release date: April 30, 2011
- Running time: 93 minutes
- Country: United States
- Language: English

Battle for Brooklyn is a 2011 documentary that follows the stories of a Brooklyn neighborhood as the residents fight to save their homes from being destroyed by an impending real estate project. The film attempts to show the unjust outcomes that are possible when moneyed interests partner up with government entities to outweigh the rights of citizens.

== Film content ==
Set in the years between 2003 and 2011, the story follows graphic designer Daniel Goldstein, the last defiantly remaining homeowner in his building, as he battles Bruce Ratner's Forest City real estate company and their plans to complete the Atlantic Yards Project in the Prospect Heights neighborhood of Brooklyn. The massive building project – according to the filmmakers, the densest real estate development in U.S. history – required the procurement of 22 acres of land, and would bring a sports complex to house the New Jersey Nets along with 16 high-rise buildings to the heart of Brooklyn. Initially tasked with filling the behemoth 22 acre complex was architect Frank Gehry, who NPR calls "American architecture's prince of wasted space". The film documents that the land was obtained by the developers through various means including the controversial declaration of the buildings in the area as "blighted", and the utilization of eminent domain to seize land from businesses and homeowners in the proposed project area.

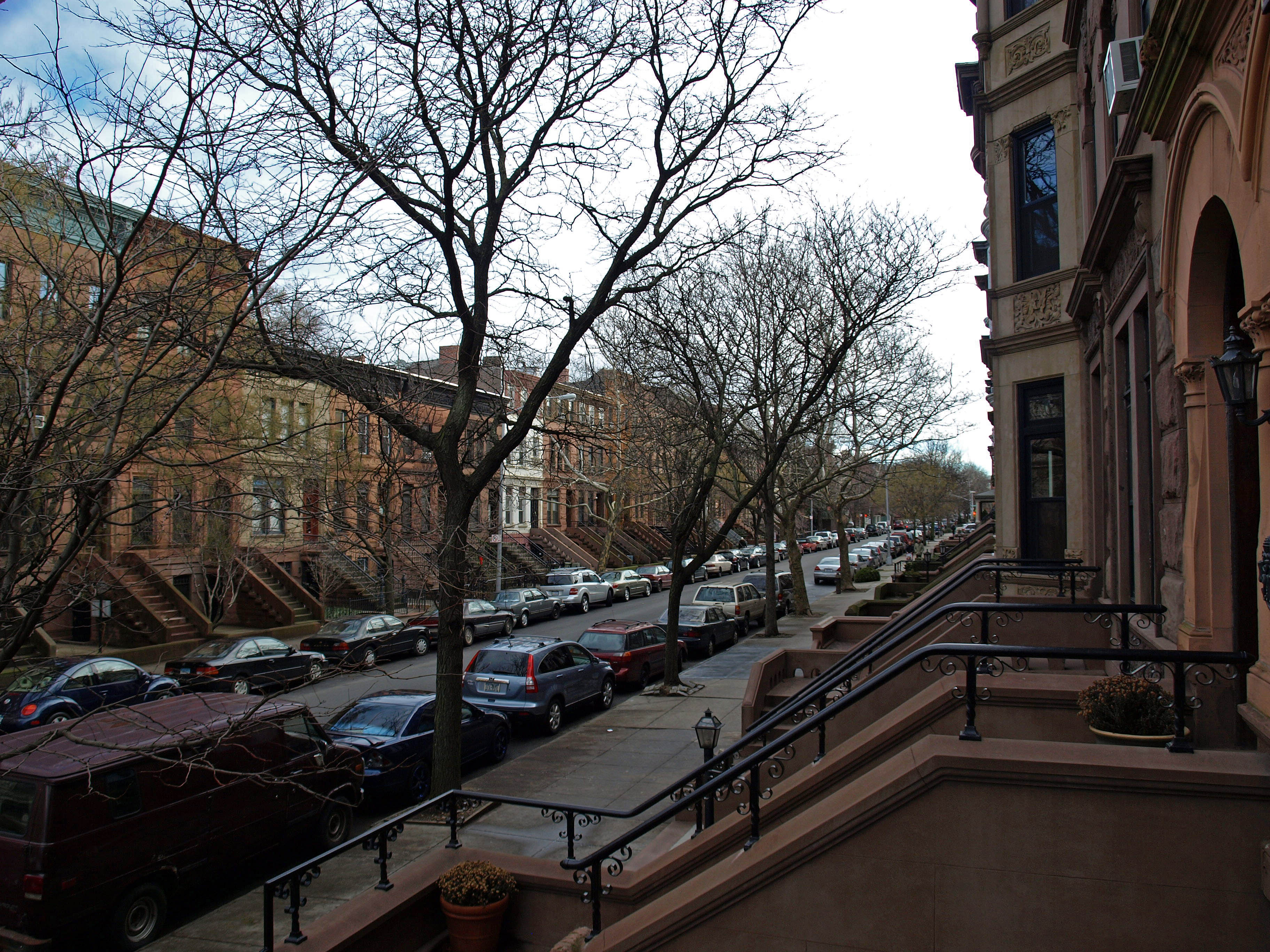
Late 19th century brownstones in Prospect Heights, not affected by the Atlantic Yards project.

Director Michael Galinsky explained that it was their intention to create an immersive experience devoid of excessive commentary by "talking heads" in order to allow the viewer some latitude to experience the events of the film for themselves. The result of this immersive experience after 7 years of filming can be seen as a character study of Daniel Goldstein – in the background of the story of the formation of Develop Don't Destroy Brooklyn and the fight against the development, Goldstein, through the course of the filming, experiences personal triumphs and great sadness, including the death of his mother, the breakup with his fiancée, the formation of a new relationship, and the birth of his child. The film documents his "evolution from a bewildered property owner to sophisticated spokesman and property rights activist."

The formation of the community activism group Develop Don't Destroy Brooklyn (DDDB) with the help of NYC Councilmember Letitia James helped bring Goldstein's cause into the public eye, quickly gaining the support of Brooklyn-based actors like Steve Buscemi, Rosie Perez and John Turturro, and conservative columnist George Will.

== Production ==
The film, which was shortlisted for an Academy Award in 2012 for the 84th Academy Awards, was produced and directed by Michael Galinsky and Suki Hawley. Hawley and Galinsky began production in 2003, when they came across a flyer explaining the protest. Galinsky started shooting the very same afternoon. The film's importance extends beyond Goldstein's fight against the abuse of eminent domain, Galinsky describes the film as being "really about the people retaking narratives from the media which is faltering ... in these situations." The film received its initial financing from the New York-based non-profit Moving Picture Institute.

In a 2011 interview, Galinsky described the events that led to the start of filming:

I saw an article in the paper that said, "A development project is coming to Brooklyn. Hooray!" I thought, "This seems a little bit weird." I knew the area it was coming to. It seemed it was impossible. It's in the middle of playgrounds and neighborhoods. My daughter went to daycare a block from there. So, when I saw a flyer saying, "stop the project," I immediately picked it up, called the number on the flyer, and the woman who answered was Patti Hagan, who I could tell right away was an interesting character. So I started shooting that afternoon. That was eight years ago.

On April 30, 2011, Battle for Brooklyn premiered in Toronto at the HotDocs Film Festival.

== Critical reception ==
Andrew O'Hehir of Salon says of the film's appeal, "No doubt "Battle for Brooklyn" will be of most interest to New Yorkers, and particularly to people who live or work in the city's most populous borough. But the film's basic situation — local residents and community activists vs. the development schemes of major politicians and big business — is an archetypal element of urban life, one that can be found in almost any city, large or small, from Maine to California."

S. James Snyder of Time Out New York writes, "Nothing propels a documentary like injustice, and Michael Galinsky and Suki Hawley's infuriating chronicle of an outer-borough David-versus-Goliath saga plays like a marathon of inequity."

Gary Goldstein of the Los Angeles Times said that although the film is "not exactly even-handed, the movie proves a deft look at a reluctant crusader and how financial sway and political override can so effectively trump the power of the average citizen."

=== Awards and recognition ===
- 2011 Best Documentary & Best Film – Brooklyn Film Festival
- New York Times Critics' Pick

=== Film Festivals ===
- 2011 Chicago Underground Film Festival
- 2011 Rooftop Films Summer Series
- 2011 Brooklyn Film Festival (United States Premiere)
- 2011 HotDocs (World Premiere)
