= All the Rage =

All the Rage may refer to:

== Books ==
- All the Rage (novel), a 2000 novel by F. Paul Wilson
- All the Rage, novel by Courtney Summers (2015)
- All the Rage, poetry criticism by William Logan (1998)
- All the Rage, memoir by Ian McLagan (2000)
- All the Rage, novel by Paul Magrs (2001)
- All the Rage, play by Keith Reddin (2006)

== Film and TV ==
- All the Rage (1997 film), a film by Roland Tec, released by Jour de Fete and Strand Releasing
- All the Rage (2016 film), a documentary film directed by Michael Galinsky
- It's the Rage (film), a 1999 film, also known as All the Rage
- "All the Rage", an episode of the fourth season of Eureka
- "All the Rage", a season 6 episode of The Loud House

== Music ==
=== Albums ===
- All the Rage (General Public album), 1984
- All the Rage (Blood on the Dance Floor album), 2011
- All the Rage (EP), a 2004 EP by Cary Brothers
- All the Rage (Kronos Quartet/Bob Ostertag album), 1993
- All the Rage (Rhonda Vincent album), 2016

=== Songs ===
- "All the Rage", a song by Elvis Costello, from the 1994 album Brutal Youth
- "All the Rage", a song by Funeral for a Friend, from the 2005 album Hours
- "All the Rage", a song by Allie X, from the 2017 album COLLXTION II: Unsolved
- "All the Rage", a song by The Rolling Stones, from the 2020 deluxe edition of Goats Head Soup
