= Barry Clark (EastEnders) =

Fictional character from the BBC soap opera EastEnders

- EastEnders character
- Portrayed by: Gary Hailes
- Duration: 1986–1989, 2022
- First appearance: Episode 183; 18 November 1986
- Last appearance: Episode 6608; 13 December 2022
- Introduced by: Julia Smith (1986); Chris Clenshaw (2022)
In-universe information
- Occupation: DJ
- Father: Mr Clark
- Brothers: Graham Clark
- First cousins: Terry

Barry Clark is a fictional character from the BBC soap opera EastEnders, played by Gary Hailes from 18 November 1986 to July 1988, returning for one episode on 23 February 1989. Hailes reprised the role in December 2022 for the funeral of Dot Cotton (June Brown).

Barry is a cockney barrow-boy, and an unlikely partner for the gay, middle classed yuppie, Colin Russell (Michael Cashman). He is much younger than his middle-aged boyfriend and as such Colin's role is almost paternal. Barry is open about his sexuality to everyone except his volatile father — and when he is finally told he takes the news so badly that Barry tries to unsuccessfully suppress his homosexuality just to appease him.

== Creation and development ==
Barry was one half of Walford's first homosexual couple. His boyfriend, Colin, had already been introduced to the show several months prior to Barry's arrival and he had proven to be an extremely popular addition to the cast. Both the audience and the residents of Walford had been kept in the dark about the fact that Colin was gay. This changed upon Barry's first scene on-screen, whereby the audience learnt that he had spent the night with Colin after picking him up the night before (off-screen) at a gay club.

Colin and Barry were two of the most controversial characters of their time — mainly because gay-orientated content was still relatively rare on prime time television during the mid-1980s. Gay characters that existed were usually farcical camp parodies, created purely for comic relief, such as Mr. Humphries in the situation comedy, Are You Being Served?. Although EastEnders was not the first UK, televised soap to include a gay character — Channel 4's Brookside had that distinction — the portrayal of an openly gay male — let alone a homosexual relationship — on a prime time, pre-watershed BBC programme was unheard of before Colin and Barry's introduction. The licence-funded BBC held a far greater audience share than the commercially-funded Channel 4, thus public reaction to EastEnders' gay characters was much stronger and more widely documented in the British press.

Colin was a middle-classed, well-meaning, slightly uptight yuppie, so the makers of EastEnders decided that his partner needed to be in stark contrast in order to prevent him from becoming too rarefied (up until this point middle-classed characters had been relatively unsuccessful and had failed to fully integrate into EastEnders predominantly working-class community). Barry was scripted to be much more down-to-earth in comparison: working class instead of middle-class; openly gay instead of 'in the closet'; loud and brash instead of shy and retiring and in addition the age difference between the two was substantial — Colin being roughly fifteen years Barry's senior. The actor Gary Hailes was chosen to play the role. Hailes was known to EastEnders co-creators, Tony Holland and Julia Smith, as he had previously attended auditions in 1984 for the role of Mark Fowler, but had been unsuccessful - the role went to David Scarboro instead.

A relationship between Colin and Barry was quickly developed and the residents of Albert Square gossiped in hushed voices about the true nature of their friendship. In 1987 EastEnders was responsible for screening the first ever gay kiss in a UK soap, much to the outrage of the viewing public. A small kiss on the forehead, given to Barry from Colin, received a record number of complaints from angry viewers. In addition, the right-wing British press reacted with fury. They began a smear campaign, branding the programme "filth" and, for a while, dubbed the show "EastBenders". There were even questions in parliament about whether it was appropriate to have gay men in a family show when AIDS was sweeping the country.

Despite the initial negativity, the storyline had a powerful impact on public attitudes and the show's handling of Colin and Barry's relationship was deemed by many gay activists as something of a breakthrough. Not only did EastEnders brave the wrath of many viewers and journalists, but they also explored anti-gay bigotry through the characters in the show - most notably via Albert Square's local gossip Dot Cotton (June Brown), who erupted into horror and ignorant self-righteousness upon discovering Colin and Barry's secret, and even spread rumours that Colin had AIDS. The episode featuring the kiss was watched by over 17 million viewers, and Colin and Barry remained on-screen for several years, accessing millions of viewers each episode — the gay community were finally being represented on mass audience mainstream television. Gradually, negative assumptions began to lessen, public opinion began to shift in Colin and Barry's favour and even Dot got used to the idea of having gay neighbours. Michael Cashman, the actor turned politician who played Colin, has commented: "This was a flagship BBC show, the most popular series in the country, and Colin and Barry were there day in, day out. The relationship wasn't sensationalised, and the public devoured it."

Barry remained on-screen as a full-time character until 1988. His character was used to highlight many other gay issues, such as homophobia, gay legal inequality — the legal age of gay sexual consent (which at the time was 21 instead of 16 as it is today) — and most notably the hardship that many young gay men face when "coming out" to their parents. The plot saw Barry forced into "outing" himself to his father, who reacted badly, and this subsequently led to Barry living the remainder of his stay in Walford as a heterosexual in order to appease him — thus highlighting the pressure to conform that many young gay people face. Although the scenes where Barry was disowned by his father (as a result of his sexuality) were filmed, they never made it to air. In an interview featured in EastEnders Handbook by Hilary Kingsly, Michael Cashman expressed how sorry he was that these particular scenes were cut, although no reason for their exclusion was given. As such, Barry's confrontation with his father occurred off-screen. Eventually, the differences between Colin and Barry became too great for them to overcome, they split and Barry left Walford for a job on a cruise ship, but returned briefly in February 1989 to aid the departure of Colin.

== Storylines ==
Barry is introduced in November 1986 as a love interest for graphic designer, Colin Russell (Michael Cashman). Barry works on Bridge Street market, selling records and other paraphernalia. His family has a reputation for being thuggish; Barry keeps his homosexuality a secret from them, fearing his father's reaction.

Personality differences between Barry and Colin causes friction in their relationship. Having been imprisoned in 1983 for motor theft, Barry gets involved in crime again in 1987 under Nick Cotton's (John Altman) influence. This goes against Colin's morals and he is invariably left to clean up Barry's blunders. When Dot Cotton (June Brown) discovers Colin and Barry are in a relationship, she worries they will infect her with AIDS. Her rumours evoke hostility from some members of the community but gradually, they get used to the idea of having gay neighbours and Barry is relieved when his older brother, Graham Clark (Gary Webster), gives his blessing too.

Differences between Colin and Barry become too great to overcome; Barry's inconsiderate behaviour exasperates Colin and their age gap causes further problems when the police discover that Barry had been under the legal age of sexual consent for homosexuals (21 at the time) when he began living with Colin. The police decide it is their duty to inform Barry's parents. Petrified of his homophobic father, Barry ultimately decides to end his relationship with Colin on New Year's Eve 1987.

To prevent his father disowning him, Barry attempts to live a heterosexual existence and begins dating a girl named Judy (Joanna Bright), to Colin's dismay. He sets up a mobile disco with Ian Beale (Adam Woodyatt), purchasing the equipment from a petty criminal named Darren Roberts (Gary McDonald). However, the equipment turns out to be borrowed via Hire Purchase, and when the repayments are not made, the finance company repossesses it all. When Barry is evicted from his flat, he decides to take a job as a DJ on a cruise liner in July 1988. Colin is saddened to see him leave. Barry returns briefly in February 1989 on the day that Colin leaves Walford. Colin departs saying a particularly heartfelt goodbye to Barry. More than thirty years later, Barry returns in December 2022 for Dot's wake. It is revealed that he has reunited with Colin after the death of Colin's husband, Eddie Tsang (Kevin Shen).

== See also ==
- List of LGBT characters in television and radio
- List of soap operas with LGBT characters
