= All the Rage (2016 film) =

2016 documentary film by Michael Galinsky

All the Rage: Saved by Sarno
- Directed by: Michael Galinsky; Suki Hawley; David Beilinson
- Produced by: Michael Galinsky; Suki Hawley; David Beilinson
- Production company: RumuR Inc.
- Release dates: 12 November 2016 (DOC NYC); 23 June 2017
- Running time: 94 minutes
- Country: United States
- Language: English

All the Rage: Saved by Sarno is a 2016 documentary film directed by Michael Galinsky. It focuses on physician John E. Sarno.

The film interviewed Howard Stern and Larry David who had previously spoken for Sarno's theories and books.

== Reception ==
Ken Jaworoski of The New York Times wrote a positive review of the film, writing, "“All the Rage” overrides most of its shortcomings by keeping a breezy tone and by showing Dr. Sarno to be a convincing speaker, as well as an affable and somewhat crusty character." David Klein of Indy Week also wrote a positive review of the film, calling it "rich and multilayered".

Sam Fragoso of TheWrap was more critical of the film, calling it "a movie about two people that ends up being about no one at all." Walter Addiego of SFGATE gave the film a mixed review, writing, "The film was clearly a labor of love, for good or ill. At one point, Galinsky jokingly refers to the production as “semi-unprofessional.” This is unusual and welcome frankness from a moviemaker." The film received mixed reviews in the Los Angeles Times and The Village Voice.
