= Larry David =

American comedian, writer and actor (born 1947)

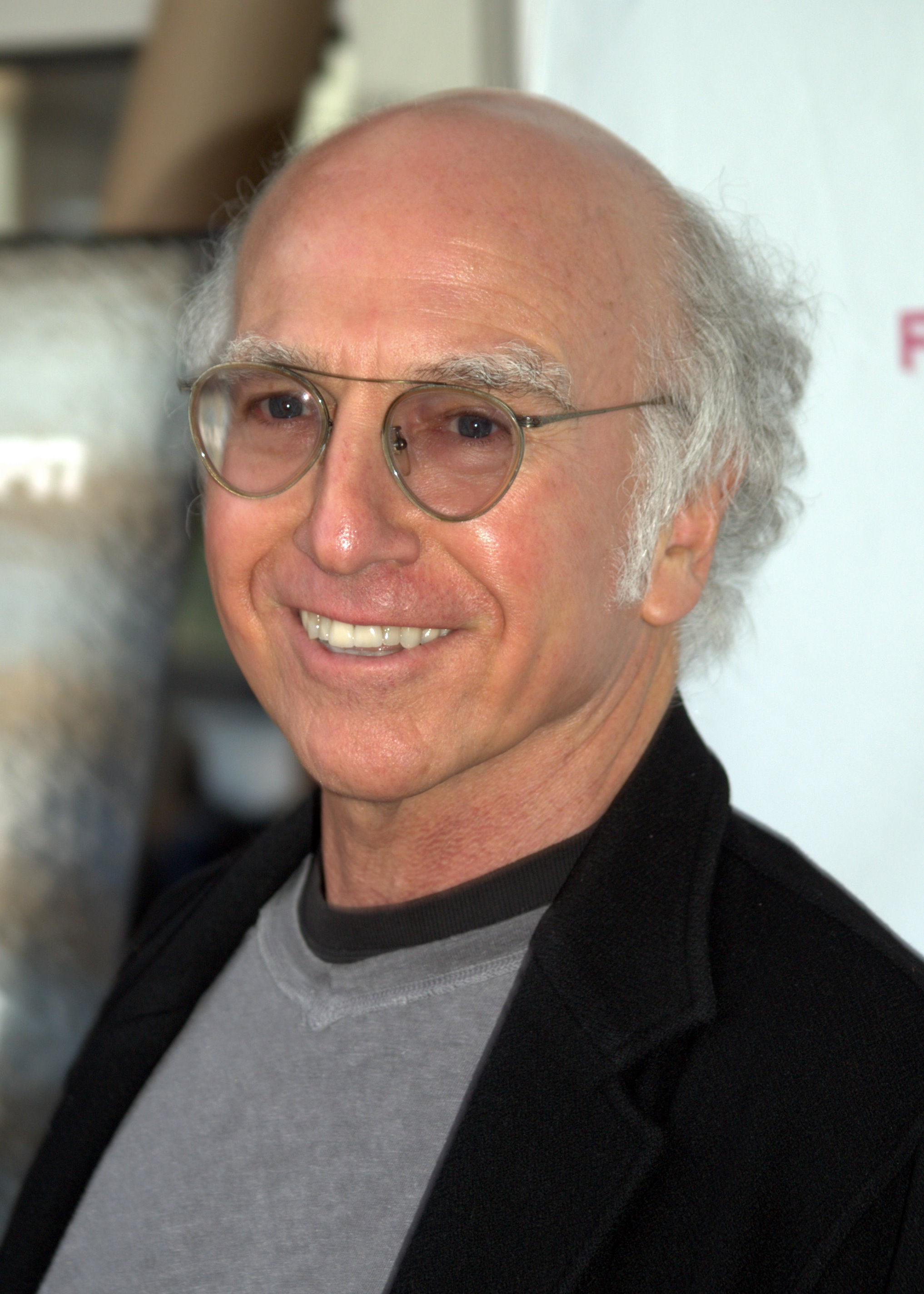
- David in 2009
- Born: Lawrence Gene David; July 2, 1947 (age 79); New York City, U.S.
- Education: University of Maryland (BA)
- Spouses: Laurie Lennard (m. 1993; div. 2007); Ashley Underwood (m. 2020)
- Children: 2, including Cazzie
- Relatives: Julie Claire (niece)

Comedy career
- Years active: 1977–present
- Medium: Stand-up; television; film
- Genres: Observational; improvisational; black comedy; blue comedy; insult comedy; deadpan; cringe; satire
- Subjects: Jewish culture; everyday life; human behavior; social awkwardness; pop culture; current events
- Military career
- Allegiance: United States
- Branch: United States Army Reserve
- Service years: 1970–1975

Lawrence Gene David (born July 2, 1947) is an American comedian, writer, actor, and television producer. He is known for his dry wit, portrayals of awkward social situations, and observations on everyday life. He has received various accolades, including two Primetime Emmy Awards, three Producers Guild of America Awards, and four Writers Guild of America Awards (including a Laurel Award for TV Writing Achievement), in addition to nominations for six Actor Awards and three Golden Globes.

David started his career as a stand-up comedian before transitioning into television comedy, where he wrote and starred in ABC's Fridays (1980–1982) and wrote briefly for Saturday Night Live (1984–1985). He gained prominence and acclaim when he and Jerry Seinfeld created the NBC sitcom Seinfeld (1989–1998), winning Primetime Emmy Awards for Outstanding Comedy Series and Outstanding Writing for a Comedy Series. He gained further recognition for creating, writing, and starring in the HBO series Curb Your Enthusiasm (2000–2024).

Since 2015, David has made guest appearances on Saturday Night Live impersonating Bernie Sanders. He has acted in three films directed by Woody Allen, including Radio Days (1987) and Whatever Works (2009). He also wrote and starred in the HBO movie Clear History (2013). On stage, he made his Broadway debut writing and starring in the comedic play Fish in the Dark (2015). David has also written several comedic pieces for The New Yorker and The New York Times.

== Early life and education ==
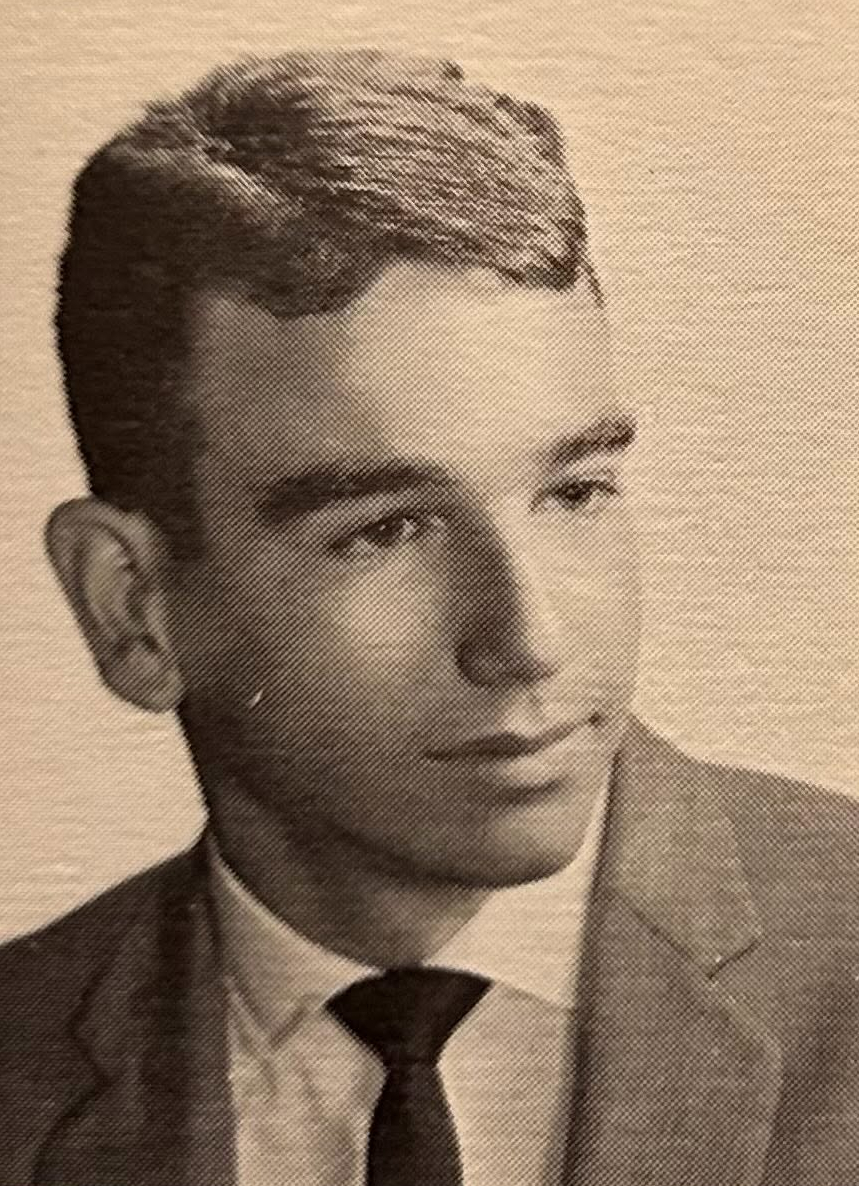
David in the Sheepshead Bay High School yearbook, 1965

David was born on July 2, 1947, in the Sheepshead Bay neighborhood of Brooklyn, New York City. His parents were Rose (née Regina Brandes) and Mortimer Julius "Morty" David, a men's clothing manufacturer, and he has an older brother, Ken. David's family is Jewish. His American Jewish father's family moved from Germany to the U.S. during the 19th century. David's mother was born into a Polish-Jewish family in Ternopil, now in Ukraine; her mother's family name was Superfein.

David graduated from Sheepshead Bay High School, now defunct and operating as Frank J. Macchiarola Educational Complex, in 1965. A sign with his photo is displayed in one of the complex's hallways. He then attended the University of Maryland, College Park, where he was a brother in Tau Epsilon Phi. He graduated in 1970 with a Bachelor of Arts in history. At college, he discovered that he could make people laugh simply by being himself. After college, David joined the United States Army Reserve and received training as a petroleum storage specialist. To avoid the final year of his six-year enlistment, he paid a psychiatrist to write a letter declaring him unfit for duty.

== Career ==
=== 1980–1987: Stand-up and SNL ===
While a stand-up comedian, David also worked as a store clerk, limousine driver, and historian. He lived in Manhattan Plaza, a federally subsidized housing complex in Manhattan's Hell's Kitchen neighborhood, across the hall from Kenny Kramer, the inspiration for the Cosmo Kramer character in Seinfeld. From 1980 to 1982, David was a writer and cast member for ABC's Fridays, where he worked with Michael Richards, who later played Kramer on Seinfeld.

From 1984 to 1985, David was a writer for NBC's Saturday Night Live (SNL), where he met cast member Julia Louis-Dreyfus. During his time at SNL, he was able to get only one sketch on the air, which aired at 12:50 a.m., the show's last time slot. David quit his job at SNL in the first season, angrily disparaging the quality of the show to producer Dick Ebersol, only to show up to work two days later as if nothing had happened. That event inspired the second-season Seinfeld episode "The Revenge". He can be heard heckling Michael McKean when McKean hosted SNL in 1984, and can be seen in the sketch "The Run, Throw, and Catch Like a Girl Olympics" when Howard Cosell hosted the season finale in 1985. In 1987, David was a writer and performer for Way Off Broadway, a variety talk show on Lifetime hosted by Joy Behar.

=== 1989–1998: Breakthrough with Seinfeld ===
In 1989, David teamed up with comedian Jerry Seinfeld to create a pilot for NBC called The Seinfeld Chronicles, which became the basis for Seinfeld, one of the most successful shows in television history, reaching the top of TV Guide's list of the 50 greatest TV shows of all time. Entertainment Weekly ranked it the third-best US TV show of all time. David made occasional uncredited appearances on the show, playing such roles as Frank Costanza's cape-wearing lawyer and the voice of George Steinbrenner. He was also the primary inspiration for the show's character George Costanza. David left Seinfeld amicably after the show's seventh season and returned two years later to write the series finale in 1998. He also continued to voice Steinbrenner.

David wrote 62 Seinfeld episodes, including 1992's "The Contest", for which he won a Primetime Emmy Award and which TV Guide ranked as episode No. 1 on its list of "TV's Top 100 Episodes of All Time". He has also been involved in other films and television series. David wrote and directed the 1998 film Sour Grapes, about two cousins who feud over a casino jackpot. It was neither a commercial nor a critical success. He has also appeared in bit roles in Woody Allen's Radio Days (1987) and New York Stories (1989).

=== 1999–2024: Curb Your Enthusiasm and acclaim ===
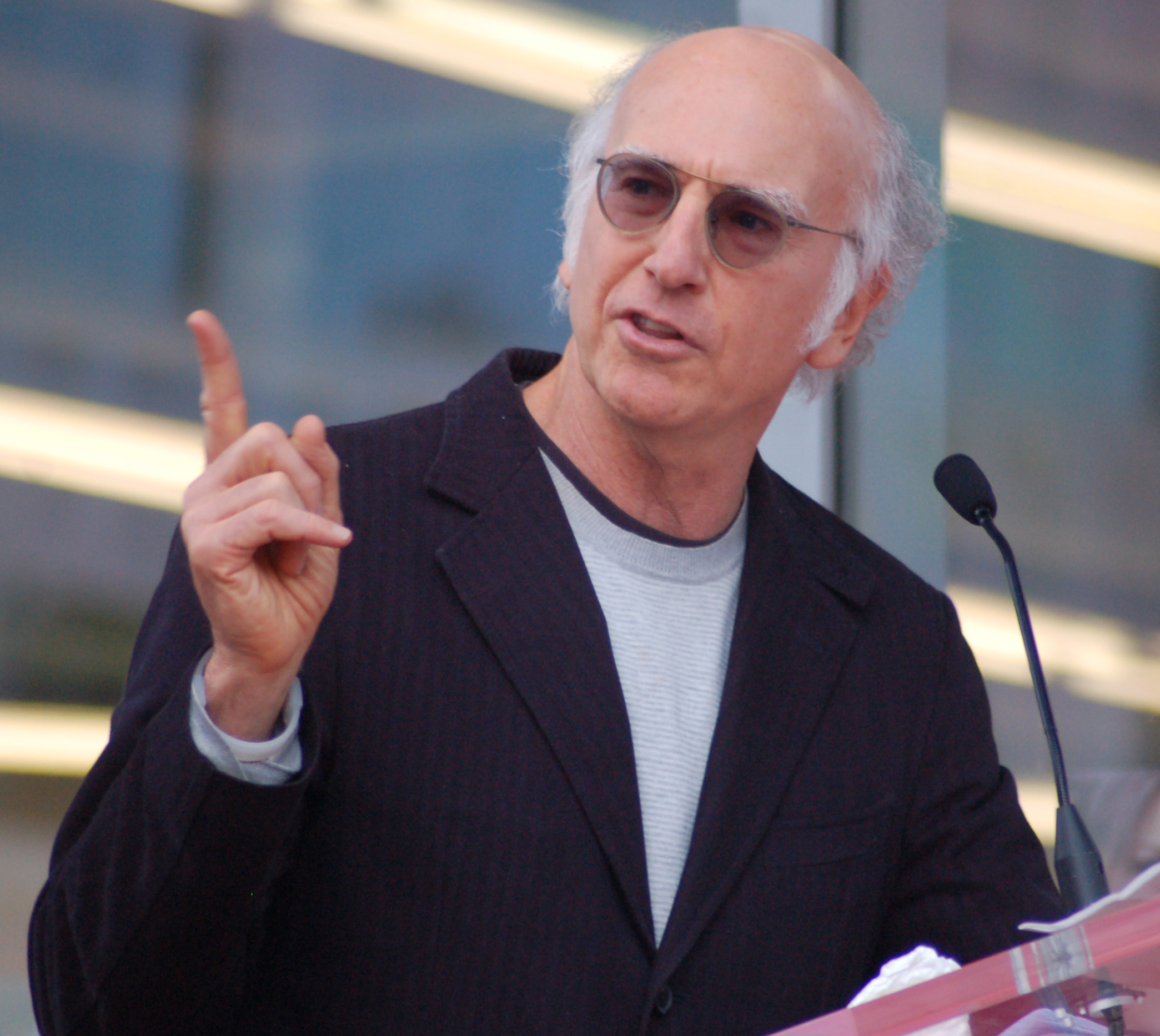
David in December 2009

The HBO cable television channel aired David's one-hour special, Larry David: Curb Your Enthusiasm, on October 17, 1999. This was followed by Curb Your Enthusiasm, an HBO television series whose first episode aired on October 15, 2000. The show revisits many of the themes of Seinfeld and is improvised from a story outline only several pages long written by David (and, from the fifth season onward, additional writers).

The actors improvise their dialogue based on the outline and direction. David has said that his character in the show, a fictionalized version of himself, is what he would be like in real life if he lacked social awareness and sensitivity. The character's numerous and frequent social faux pas, misunderstandings, and ironic coincidences are the basis of much of the show's comedy and have led to the entry into the American pop culture lexicon of the expression "Larry David moment", meaning an inadvertently created socially awkward situation. Curb Your Enthusiasm has been described as depicting "the things nobody wants to say, but wish they could".

The show is based on David's life following the fortune he earned from Seinfeld; semi-retired, he strives to live a fulfilled life. Alongside David is his wife Cheryl (Cheryl Hines), his manager and best friend Jeff (Jeff Garlin), and Jeff's wife Susie (Susie Essman). Celebrities, including comedians Richard Lewis, Wanda Sykes, and Bob Einstein, appeared on the show regularly. Actors Ted Danson and Mary Steenburgen have had recurring roles as themselves.

The show is critically acclaimed and has been nominated for 30 Primetime Emmy Awards, with one win, as well as a Golden Globe win. In the first six seasons, Julia Louis-Dreyfus and Jason Alexander appear in several episodes, and Jerry Seinfeld has a cameo. In season 7, the cast of Seinfeld, including Michael Richards, return in a story arc involving David's attempt to organize a Seinfeld reunion special. On June 2, 2010, the series premiered on the TV Guide Network, its network television debut. TV Guide Network also produced a series of related discussions with high-profile guest stars, media pundits, and prominent social figures called "Curb: The Discussion" debating the moral implications of each episode. David is quoted as saying "Finally, thanks to the TV Guide Network, I'll get a chance to watch actual, intelligent people discuss and debate the issues addressed on 'Curb'. Now if only someone could tell me where this alleged 'Network' is, I might even watch it." The show's 12th and final season premiered in January 2024.

David played the leading role in Woody Allen's 2009 comedy film Whatever Works alongside Evan Rachel Wood. He had a cameo appearance on the HBO series Entourage as a client of Ari Gold, and because his daughters were Hannah Montana fans, David and his daughters guest-starred as themselves in the episode "My Best Friend's Boyfriend", in which they wait for a table at a fancy restaurant. David appeared as a panelist on the NBC series The Marriage Ref and also played Sister Mary-Mengele in the 2012 reboot of The Three Stooges. He co-wrote and starred in the 2013 HBO television film Clear History. David wrote and starred in the Broadway play Fish in the Dark. Also appearing were Rita Wilson, Jayne Houdyshell, and Rosie Perez. The play centers on the death of a family patriarch. It opened on March 5, 2015. Jason Alexander took over David's role in July. The play closed in August. As of February 1, 2015, its advance sale of $13.5 million had broken records for a Broadway show.

==== Portrayal of Bernie Sanders ====
Since 2015, David has made multiple guest appearances portraying 2016 and 2020 United States presidential election candidate Bernie Sanders on Saturday Night Live; he also hosted the show on February 6, 2016, with musical guest The 1975 and a cameo by Sanders himself, and on November 4, 2017, with musical guest Miley Cyrus.

In 2017, PBS's Finding Your Roots discovered through genealogical research that David and Sanders are distantly related. Sanders told David the news. "I was very happy about that," David said, according to Variety. "I thought there must have been some connection." The comedian explained that Sanders is "a third cousin or something". He is in fact David's sixth cousin once removed.

On January 8, 2020, David joked on The Late Show with Stephen Colbert, "I would say, I would beg him [Bernie] to drop out so I don't have to keep flying in from Los Angeles to do SNL. I thought when he had the heart attack that would be it, I wouldn't have to fly in from Los Angeles. But, you know, he's indestructible. Nothing stops this man!" He later added, "If he wins, do you know what that's going to do to my life? Do you have any idea? I mean, it will be great for the country—great for the country, terrible for me."

==== "My Dinner With Adolf" essay (2025) ====
On April 21, 2025, The New York Times published an opinion essay by David titled "My Dinner With Adolf". Framed as a fictional 1939 dinner between the narrator and Adolf Hitler, the satirical piece uses dark humor to explore how personal charm can dangerously obscure the true nature of monstrous people. Without directly naming any contemporary figures, the essay mirrors the language Bill Maher used when describing his dinner with Donald Trump. Despite being a longtime critic of Trump, Maher characterized Trump as "gracious and measured" in private.

=== 2025–present: Return to television ===
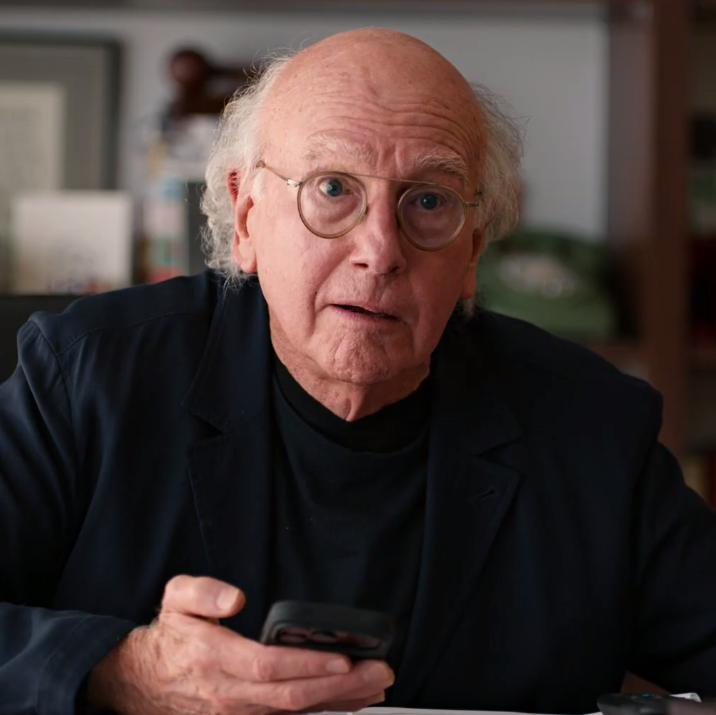
David in a 2026 commercial

In July 2025, David announced his return to television with a seven-episode sketch comedy limited series for HBO, centered on overlooked figures and absurd moments in U.S. history. The series is co-written and executive produced by David and longtime collaborator Jeff Schaffer, who will also direct. The series is produced in collaboration with Barack and Michelle Obama's Higher Ground Productions. David, who said he was returning to TV "with a heavy heart" following the end of Curb Your Enthusiasm, will star alongside several familiar faces from Curb and guest appearances. The project coincided with the 250th anniversary of the United States. Titled Life, Larry and the Pursuit of Unhappiness, it premiered on June 26, 2026.

== Influences ==
David has named Woody Allen, Mel Brooks, Phil Silvers, Abbott and Costello, Jackie Mason, Alan King, Don Rickles, and Mad magazine as influences.

== Personal life ==
David lives in the Pacific Palisades neighborhood of Los Angeles, California. He was married to Laurie Lennard from 1993 to 2007. They have two daughters, Cazzie David and Romy David. Larry and Laurie became contributing bloggers at The Huffington Post in 2005. In 2017, David was introduced to producer Ashley Underwood at a birthday party for Sacha Baron Cohen. They married in 2020. David's niece is actress Julie Claire, who appears in Seinfeld and Curb Your Enthusiasm.

David is an atheist and an avid sports fan. A native New Yorker, he supports the New York Jets, Yankees, Knicks, and Rangers. David is also a supporter of the Democratic Party. In 2010, he wrote an article for The New York Times criticizing the extension of the Bush tax cuts for the wealthy. He ended the article by sarcastically thanking then-President Barack Obama for approving the extension. In October 2026, David published a satirical essay in Air Mail mocking the platform and policies of the Democratic Socialists of America as naive, oversensitive, and antisemitic.

=== Wealth ===
In 2013, Charlie Rose estimated David's net worth at around $500 million. Two years later, two other estimates put the number between $400 million and $900 million. In 2020, National Review offered an estimate of about $400 million.

Most of David's wealth originates from syndication deals of Seinfeld and Curb Your Enthusiasm, the former having netted $3.1 billion in rerun fees as of 2013. The syndication of Seinfeld earned David an estimated $250 million in 1998 alone. In 2008, David was reported to have grossed $55 million, mostly from Seinfeld syndication and work on Curb Your Enthusiasm.

David's net worth was parodied in a 2001 episode of Curb Your Enthusiasm, "The Shrimp Incident", in which HBO executive Allan Wasserman yells at David: "If you want shrimp, take your $475 million, go buy a shrimp boat."

In a 2015 interview with CBS, David confirmed that his 2007 divorce reduced his wealth by half in the community property state of California. "I have a lot of money", he said, but added that the "figures out there are crazy".

=== Cryptocurrency promotion lawsuit ===
David was among several celebrities who appeared in television commercials for the cryptocurrency exchange FTX that aired during Super Bowl LVI in February 2022. In November 2022, FTX filed for bankruptcy, and David, alongside other spokespeople, was sued in a class action lawsuit. In January 2024, David expressed some regret over appearing in the ad, and said of the class action suit, "I would love to be part of [it], 'cause part of my salary was in crypto, so I lost a lot of money". In May 2025, a federal court dismissed most claims in the lawsuit.

== Works ==
=== Film ===
Year	Title	Role	Notes
1977	It Happened at Lakewood Manor	Extra in crowd near hotel	
1983	Can She Bake a Cherry Pie?	Mort's Friend	
1983	Second Thoughts	Monroe Clark	
1987	Radio Days	Communist Neighbor	
1989	New York Stories	Theater Manager	
1998	Sour Grapes	Studio Executive/Annoying Doctor/Singing Bum	Also writer and director
2009	Whatever Works	Boris Yelnikoff	
2012	The Three Stooges	Sister Mary-Mengele	
2015	Misery Loves Comedy	Himself	
2016	The First Monday in May	Himself	
2016	All the Rage	Himself	
2017	Where Have You Gone, Lou diMaggio?	Himself	
2017	Miracle on 42nd Street	Himself	
2017	Long Shot	Himself	
2021	The Super Bob Einstein Movie	Himself	
2023	Albert Brooks: Defending My Life	Himself	

=== Television ===
Year	Title	Role	Notes
1980–1982	Fridays	Various	54 episodes; also writer
1984–1985	Saturday Night Live	Various	7 episodes; also writer
1987	It's Garry Shandling's Show		Wrote episode: "Sarah"; Credited as Mac Brandes
1987	Way Off Broadway	Various	Also writer
1989–1998	Seinfeld	George Steinbrenner / Newman (voices) (Note: David voices an offscreen Newman in "The Revenge". After that, Newman was played by Wayne Knight.) / various	180 episodes; co-creator, writer and producer
1993	Love & War	Himself	Episode: "Let's Not Call It Love"
1999	Larry David: Curb Your Enthusiasm	Himself	One-hour special; also creator, writer and executive producer
2000–2024	Curb Your Enthusiasm	Himself	120 episodes; also creator, writer and executive producer
2004	Entourage	Himself	Episode: "New York"
2007	Hannah Montana	Himself	Episode: "My Best Friend's Boyfriend"
2011	The Paul Reiser Show	Himself	Episode: "The Father's Occupation"
2012	Comedians in Cars Getting Coffee	Himself (guest)	Episode: "Larry Eats a Pancake"
2013	Clear History	Nathan Flomm	Television film; also writer and producer
2014	TripTank	Himself (voice)	Episode: "Roy & Ben's Day Off"
2015	The League	Future Ruxin	Episode: "The Great Night of Shiva"
2015–2020	Saturday Night Live	Himself (host) / Bernie Sanders	15 episodes
2015	SNL40: The Anniversary Special	Himself	Television special
2016	Maya & Marty	Himself	Episode: "Jimmy Fallon & Miley Cyrus"
2016–2026	Last Week Tonight with John Oliver	Himself	3 episodes
2022	Toast of Tinseltown	Sola Mirronek	Episodes: "Anger Man" and "The Scorecard"
2025	SNL50: The Anniversary Special	Himself	Television special
2025	SNL50: Beyond Saturday Night	Himself	Episode: "Written By: A Week Inside the Writers Room"
2026	Life, Larry and the Pursuit of Unhappiness	Various	Sketch comedy miniseries, also creator, writer and producer

=== Theater ===
Year	Title	Role	Theatre	Notes	Ref.
2015	Fish in the Dark	Norman Drexel	Cort Theatre, Broadway	Also writer	

=== Bibliography ===
- David, Larry (January 1, 2006). "Cowboys Are My Weakness". The New York Times.
- David, Larry (December 20, 2010). "Thanks for the Tax Cut!". The New York Times.
- David, Larry (July 23, 2018). "The Most Important Meal of the Day". The New York Times.
- David, Larry (August 10, 2018). "What Really Happened at Trump Tower". The New York Times.
- David, Larry (November 18, 2019). "On the First-World Campaign Trail". Shouts & Murmurs. The New Yorker. Vol. 95, no. 36. p. 29.
- David, Larry (November 22, 2019). "Imagining What Keeps Trump Up at Night". The New York Times.
- David, Larry (November 29, 2021). "Larry David's Notes for His Biographer". The New Yorker.
- David, Larry (April 21, 2025). "Larry David: My Dinner with Adolf". The New York Times. (Note: An opinion piece parodying Bill Maher's opening monologue "Mr. Maher Goes to Washington" describing his White House dinner with Donald Trump.)

== Awards and nominations ==
David has received numerous awards, including two Emmy Awards, three Producers Guild of America Awards, and three Writers Guild of America Awards. He has been nominated for three Golden Globe Awards and six Actor Awards. Fellow comedians and comedy insiders voted David the 23rd-greatest comedy star ever in a poll to select The Comedian's Comedian.

== See also ==
- List of atheists in film, radio, television and theater
- List of Primetime Emmy Award winners
