= Half-cocked =

Half-cocked may refer to:

- half-cock, the position the hammer of a firearm that is partially cocked
- Halfcocked, a hard rock band
- Half-Cocked (film), a 1994 film
