= List of awards and nominations received by Larry David =

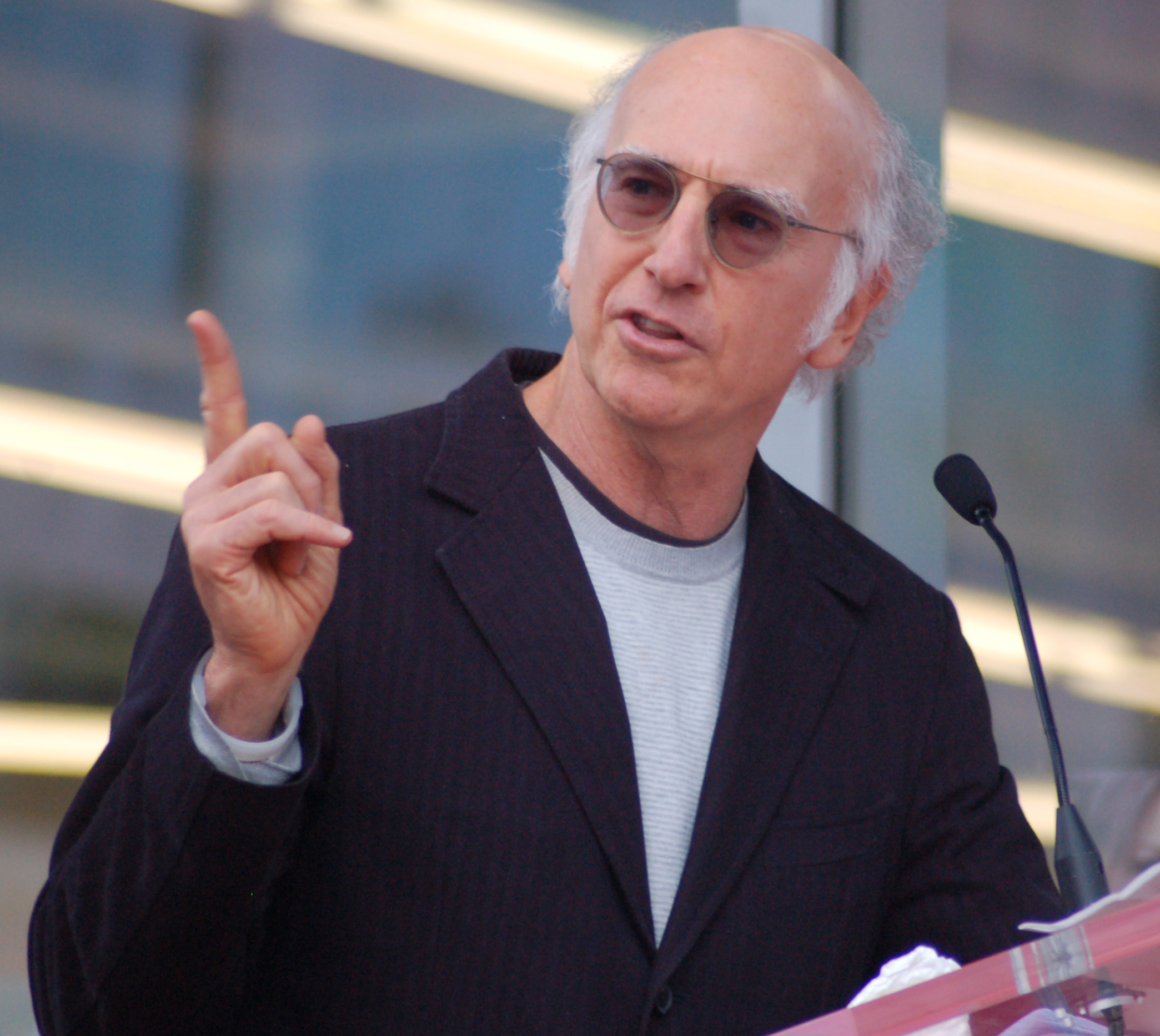
David in 2009

This article is a List of awards and nominations received by Larry David.

Larry David is an American comedian and writer. He is known for creating the NBC sitcom Seinfeld (1989–1998), and creating and starring in the HBO comedy series Curb Your Enthusiasm (2000–2023). He has received numerous awards including two Emmy Awards, three Producers Guild of America Awards and three Writers Guild of America Awards as well as nominations for three Golden Globe Awards and six Screen Actors Guild Awards.

== Major associations ==
=== Critics' Choice Awards ===
Year	Category	Nominated work	Result	Ref.
Critics' Choice Television Awards
2012	Best Actor in a Comedy Series	Curb Your Enthusiasm	Nominated	
2016	Best Guest Performer in a Comedy Series	Saturday Night Live	Nominated	

=== Emmy Awards ===
Year	Category	Nominated work	Result	Ref.
1991	Outstanding Writing for a Comedy Series	Seinfeld (episode: "The Deal")	Nominated	
1991	Outstanding Writing for a Comedy Series	Seinfeld (episode: "The Pony Remark")	Nominated	
1992	Outstanding Comedy Series	Seinfeld (season 3)	Nominated	
1992	Outstanding Writing for a Comedy Series	Seinfeld (episode: "The Tape")	Nominated	
1992	Outstanding Writing for a Comedy Series	Seinfeld (episode: "The Parking Garage")	Nominated	
1993	Outstanding Comedy Series	Seinfeld (season 4)	Won	
1993	Outstanding Writing for a Comedy Series	Seinfeld (episode: "The Contest")	Won	
1994	Outstanding Comedy Series	Seinfeld (season 5)	Nominated	
1994	Outstanding Writing for a Comedy Series	Seinfeld (episode: "The Mango")	Nominated	
1994	Outstanding Writing for a Comedy Series	Seinfeld (episode: "The Puffy Shirt")	Nominated	
1995	Outstanding Comedy Series	Seinfeld (season 6)	Nominated	
1996	Outstanding Comedy Series	Seinfeld (season 7)	Nominated	
2002	Outstanding Comedy Series	Curb Your Enthusiasm (season 2)	Nominated	
2003	Outstanding Comedy Series	Curb Your Enthusiasm (season 3)	Nominated	
2003	Outstanding Lead Actor in a Comedy Series	Curb Your Enthusiasm (episode: "The Special Section")	Nominated	
2004	Outstanding Comedy Series	Curb Your Enthusiasm (season 4)	Nominated	
2004	Outstanding Lead Actor in a Comedy Series	Curb Your Enthusiasm (episode: "Opening Night")	Nominated	
2006	Outstanding Comedy Series	Curb Your Enthusiasm season 5)	Nominated	
2006	Outstanding Lead Actor in a Comedy Series	Curb Your Enthusiasm (episode: "The Ski Lift")	Nominated	
2008	Outstanding Comedy Series	Curb Your Enthusiasm (season 6)	Nominated	
2010	Outstanding Comedy Series	Curb Your Enthusiasm (season 7)	Nominated	
2010	Outstanding Lead Actor in a Comedy Series	Curb Your Enthusiasm (episode: "Seinfeld")	Nominated	
2012	Outstanding Comedy Series	Curb Your Enthusiasm (season 8)	Nominated	
2012	Outstanding Lead Actor in a Comedy Series	Curb Your Enthusiasm (episode: "Palestinian Chicken")	Nominated	
2016	Outstanding Guest Actor in a Comedy Series	Saturday Night Live (episode: "Larry David / The 1975")	Nominated	
2018	Outstanding Comedy Series	Curb Your Enthusiasm (season 9)	Nominated	
2018	Outstanding Lead Actor in a Comedy Series	Curb Your Enthusiasm (episode: "Fatwa!")	Nominated	
2020	Outstanding Comedy Series	Curb Your Enthusiasm (season 10)	Nominated	
2022	Outstanding Comedy Series	Curb Your Enthusiasm (season 11)	Nominated	
2024	Outstanding Comedy Series	Curb Your Enthusiasm (season 12)	Nominated	
2024	Outstanding Lead Actor in a Comedy Series	Curb Your Enthusiasm	Nominated	

=== Golden Globe Awards ===
Year	Category	Nominated work	Result	Ref.
2002	Best Actor – Television Series Musical or Comedy	Curb Your Enthusiasm	Nominated	
2004	Best Actor – Television Series Musical or Comedy	Curb Your Enthusiasm	Nominated	
2005	Best Actor – Television Series Musical or Comedy	Curb Your Enthusiasm	Nominated	

== Guild awards ==
=== Producers Guild of America Awards ===
Year	Category	Nominated work	Result	Ref.
1993	Most Promising Producer in Television	Seinfeld	Won	
2002	Outstanding Producer of Episodic Comedy	Curb Your Enthusiasm	Won	
2004	Outstanding Producer of Episodic Comedy	Curb Your Enthusiasm	Won	
2006	Outstanding Producer of Episodic Comedy	Curb Your Enthusiasm	Nominated	
2008	Outstanding Producer of Episodic Comedy	Curb Your Enthusiasm	Nominated	
2010	Outstanding Producer of Episodic Comedy	Curb Your Enthusiasm	Nominated	
2012	Outstanding Producer of Episodic Comedy	Curb Your Enthusiasm	Nominated	
2017	Outstanding Producer of Episodic Comedy	Curb Your Enthusiasm	Nominated	
2020	Outstanding Producer of Episodic Comedy	Curb Your Enthusiasm	Nominated	

=== Actor Awards ===
Year	Category	Nominated work	Result	Ref.
2005	Outstanding Ensemble in a Comedy Series	Curb Your Enthusiasm	Nominated	
2005	Outstanding Actor in a Comedy Series	Curb Your Enthusiasm	Nominated	
2009	Outstanding Ensemble in a Comedy Series	Curb Your Enthusiasm	Nominated	
2009	Outstanding Actor in a Comedy Series	Curb Your Enthusiasm	Nominated	
2017	Outstanding Ensemble in a Comedy Series	Curb Your Enthusiasm	Nominated	
2017	Outstanding Actor in a Comedy Series	Curb Your Enthusiasm	Nominated	

=== Writers Guild of America Awards ===
Year	Category	Nominated work	Result	Ref.
1990	Best Episodic Comedy	Seinfeld: "The Stake Out"	Nominated	
1992	Best Episodic Comedy	Seinfeld: "The Stranded"	Nominated	
1992	Best Episodic Comedy	Seinfeld: "The New Friend"	Nominated	
1992	Best Episodic Comedy	Seinfeld: "The Parking Space"	Nominated	
1993	Best Episodic Comedy	Seinfeld: "The Contest"	Won	
1994	Best Episodic Comedy	Seinfeld: "The Mango"	Won	
2005	Best Comedy Series	Curb Your Enthusiasm	Won	
2006	Best Comedy Series	Curb Your Enthusiasm	Nominated	
2007	Best Comedy Series	Curb Your Enthusiasm	Nominated	
2009	Best Comedy Series	Curb Your Enthusiasm	Nominated	
2009	Laurel Award for TV Writing Achievement		Received	
2011	Best Comedy Series	Curb Your Enthusiasm	Nominated	
2017	Best Comedy Series	Curb Your Enthusiasm	Nominated	
2020	Best Comedy Series	Curb Your Enthusiasm	Nominated	
2021	Best Comedy Series	Curb Your Enthusiasm	Nominated	

== Miscellaneous awards ==
=== Gold Derby Awards ===
- 2004 – Best Lead Comedy Actor – Curb Your Enthusiasm – nominee
- 2010 – Best Lead Comedy Actor – Curb Your Enthusiasm – nominee
- 2012 – Best Lead Comedy Actor – Curb Your Enthusiasm – nominee
- 2016 – Best Guest Comedy Actor – Saturday Night Live – nominee
- 2020 – Best Lead Comedy Actor – Curb Your Enthusiasm – nominee

=== Satellite Awards ===
- 2004 – Best Actor in a Comedy Series – Curb Your Enthusiasm – nominee
- 2005 – Best Actor in a Comedy Series – Curb Your Enthusiasm – nominee

=== Television Critics Association ===
- 2003 – Individual Achievement in Comedy – Curb Your Enthusiasm – nominee
- 2004 – Individual Achievement in Comedy – Curb Your Enthusiasm – nominee

=== US Comedy Arts Festival ===
- 1999 – AFI Star Award – Winner

=== OFTA Awards ===
- 2003 – Best Actor in a Comedy Series – Curb Your Enthusiasm – nominee
- 2004 – Best Actor in a Comedy Series – Curb Your Enthusiasm – nominee
- 2010 – Best Actor in a Comedy Series – Curb Your Enthusiasm – nominee
- 2016 – Best Male Actor in a Variety Series – Saturday Night Live – nominee
- 2018 – Best Actor in a Comedy Series – Curb Your Enthusiasm – nominee
- 2020 – Best Actor in a Comedy Series – Curb Your Enthusiasm – nominee
