= Colin Russell (EastEnders) =

- EastEnders character
- Portrayed by: Michael Cashman
- Duration: 1986–1989, 2016, 2022
- First appearance: Episode 153; 5 August 1986
- Last appearance: Episode 6608; 13 December 2022
- Introduced by: Julia Smith (1986); Sean O'Connor (2016); Chris Clenshaw (2022)
- Book appearances: A Single Man
In-universe information
- Occupation: Graphic designer
- Mother: Ena Russell
- Brothers: Bill Russell
- Husband: Eddie Tsang (2016-; his death)
- Aunts: Joan Russell

Colin Russell is a fictional character from the BBC soap opera EastEnders, played by Michael Cashman. The character appears between 5 August 1986 and 23 February 1989 and on 8 and 9 September 2016. Colin is originally portrayed as a middle-class yuppie with a kind heart. The character is Walford's first on-screen gay resident and he featured in the UK's first homosexual kiss on a soap opera, which caused controversy in the British press. Cashman reprised the role of Colin for the funeral of Dot Cotton (June Brown) for two episodes broadcast on 12 and 13 December 2022.

== Character creation and development ==
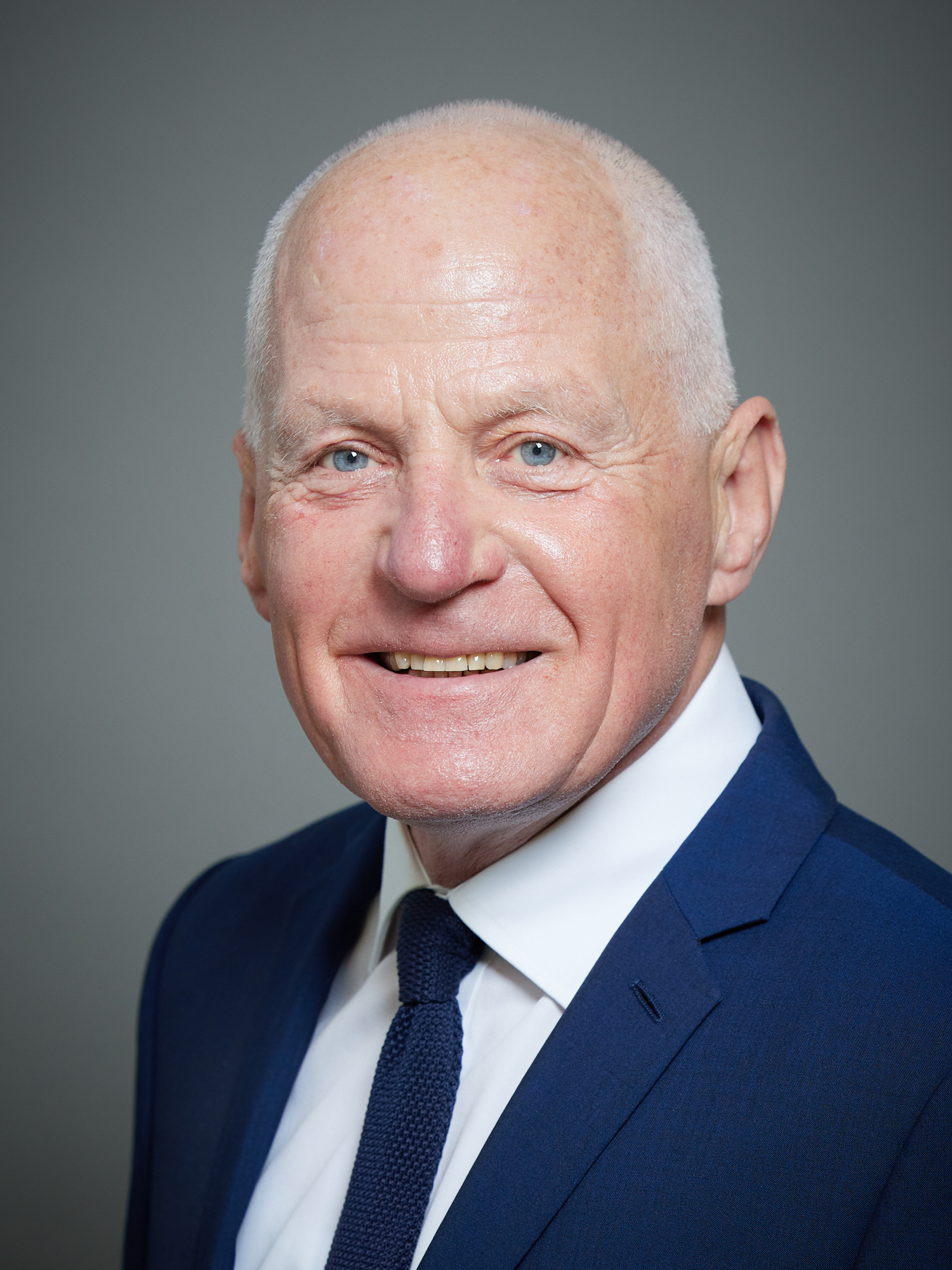
Colin was portrayed by Michael Cashman (pictured).

Colin is EastEnders' first homosexual character. Introduced in August 1986, Colin was one of the more popular characters in the early years of the programme. At first the audience and the residents of Walford were kept in the dark about the fact that Colin was gay. This changed by the end of the year, at which time Colin acquired a young boyfriend named Barry Clark (Gary Hailes).

Colin was one of the most controversial characters of his time — mainly because gay-orientated content was still relatively rare on prime-time television during the mid-1980s. Gay characters that existed were usually farcical, camp parodies, created purely for comic relief, such as Mr Humphries in the situation comedy, Are You Being Served? Although EastEnders was not the first UK televised soap to include a gay character (Channel 4's Brookside had that accolade), the portrayal of an openly gay male, let alone a homosexual relationship, on a prime-time, pre-watershed BBC programme was unheard of before Colin and Barry's introduction. The licence funded BBC held a far greater audience share than the commercially funded Channel 4, thus public reaction to EastEnders' gay characters was much stronger and more widely documented in the British press.

Colin was a middle-class, well-meaning, slightly uptight yuppie, and his inclusion was an attempt to portray the gentrification of the East End of London. The openly gay actor and gay activist Michael Cashman, who had roots in the East End, was chosen to play the role. Cashman initially resisted playing Colin, but was persuaded by his boyfriend, Paul Cottingham, and after receiving his parents' backing, he accepted the part. During his audition, Cashman was not aware of his character's sexual orientation.

The makers of EastEnders decided that Colin's partner needed to be in stark contrast in order to prevent Colin from becoming too rarefied (up until this point middle-classed characters had been relatively unsuccessful and had failed to fully integrate into EastEnders predominantly working-class community). Barry was scripted to be much more down-to-earth in comparison: working-class instead of middle-class; openly gay instead of 'in the closet'; loud and brash instead of shy and retiring, and in addition the age difference between the two was substantial — Colin being roughly fifteen years Barry's senior.

A relationship between Colin and Barry was quickly developed and the residents of Albert Square gossiped in hushed voices about the true nature of their friendship. In 1987 EastEnders was responsible for screening the first ever gay kiss in a UK soap opera, much to the outrage of the viewing public. A small kiss on the forehead, given to Barry from Colin, received a record number of complaints from angry viewers. In addition, the right-wing British press reacted with fury. They began a smear campaign, branding the programme 'filth' and, for a while, dubbed the show EastBenders. There were even questions in Parliament about whether it was appropriate to have gay men in a family show when AIDS was sweeping the country.

Despite the initial negativity, the storyline had a powerful impact on public attitudes and the show's handling of Colin and Barry's relationship was deemed by many gay activists as something of a breakthrough. Not only did EastEnders brave the wrath of many moralistic viewers and bigoted journalists, but they also exposed that bigotry through the characters in the show — most notably via the inane naivety of local gossip Dot Cotton (June Brown), who erupted into horror and ignorant self-righteousness upon discovering Colin and Barry's secret, and even spread rumours that Colin had AIDS. The episode featuring the kiss was watched by over 17 million viewers, and Colin and Barry remained on-screen for several years, accessing millions of viewers each episode — the gay community were finally being represented on mass audience mainstream television. Gradually, negative assumptions began to lessen, public opinion began to shift in Colin and Barry's favour and even Dot got used to the idea of having gay neighbours. Michael Cashman has commented: "This was a flagship BBC show, the most popular series in the country, and Colin and Barry were there day in, day out. The relationship wasn't sensationalised, and the public devoured it." The importance of Colin was so great in the gay community at the time that Cashman was asked to lead a march against Section 28, which prohibited local authorities from promoting homosexuality or the acceptability of homosexuality.

Barry and Colin remained an on-screen couple until the end of 1987. Their characters were used to highlight many other gay issues, such as homophobia, gay bashing and gay legal inequality — i.e. the legal age of gay sexual consent (which at the time was 21 instead of 16 as it is today). Eventually, the differences between Colin and Barry became too great for them to overcome, they split and Barry left Walford for a job on a cruise ship.

Colin had a health scare during the autumn of 1988 and for a moment it looked like EastEnders might have been about to do an AIDS storyline. The press speculated that Colin was showing early signs of the disease and the possibility was even briefly indicated too on-screen when Colin himself began to fear that his symptoms were AIDS related. In fact giving Colin AIDS was never the programme's intention — it was felt that the most simplistic and unhelpful message that the programme could give out would be to have its only homosexual character become HIV positive — particularly as it happened at a time when misconceptions and fear about AIDS were rife. Colin was eventually diagnosed with multiple sclerosis, although this fact was kept from him by his doctor for the remainder of the year and he lived out 1988 with the belief that he was in perfect health.

Towards the end of 1988 Colin found new love, with a fellow yuppie — Guido Smith (Nicholas Donovan) — whom he met through his work. Colin's gay relationship was once again the cause of much controversy in January 1989 when EastEnders aired the first homosexual mouth-to-mouth kiss on a British television soap opera. The chaste peck on the lips between Colin and Guido resulted in a front page denunciation in The Sun newspaper, written by then Sun writer Piers Morgan, who described it as "a homosexual love scene between yuppie poofs... when millions of children were watching". The kiss was watched by twenty million people and came at a time when Margaret Thatcher’s government had set forward a moral agenda that urged a return to traditional family values. The Sun printed the assertion that "Furious MPs last night demanded a ban on EastEnders as the BBC soap showed two men kissing full on the lips".

Cashman decided to quit the show in the early part of 1989. While still on the cast of EastEnders, Cashman had founded the influential gay campaign group Stonewall and has now given up acting to become a Labour MEP. He was elected to the European Parliament in 1999 where he was the Labour spokesperson on human rights. He is also an active campaigner across a wide range of issues. On screen, Colin finally learned he had multiple sclerosis and decided to leave Walford to live with his brother and face a rapid decline in health. In an interview featured in EastEnders Handbook by Hilary Kingsly, Michael Cashman looked back fondly on Albert Square and his character, commenting: "Quite a few gay activists thought Colin too nice, but I thought he was just right. There was a fuss about his kiss with Barry which was sad — people should be upset by demonstrations of hate, not love".

On 25 August 2016, it was announced that Cashman had reprised the role for two episodes to air the following month. Colin shared scenes with Dot Cotton (Brown), but full details of the storyline were initially held back. Of his return to EastEnders, Cashman stated: "It was a real joy, indeed a privilege, to return to my old home of Albert Square. To be amongst so many friends again, and to be back in the place where 30 years ago I started an amazing journey. An amazing journey which incredibly helped to change the country, and certainly its attitude to lesbian, gay and bisexual people."

== Storylines ==
=== 1986–1989 ===
Colin and Guido were responsible for the first mouth-to-mouth gay kiss on a British television soap opera (24 January 1989). The Sun newspaper writer Piers Morgan branded it a "love scene between yuppie poofs".

Colin, a graphic designer, moves to Albert Square in August 1986. Colin is gay but he initially keeps this secret from the other residents of Walford. Debbie Wilkins (Shirley Cheriton) befriends Colin and they have dinner together. He comforts her when she cries for her dead fiancé, but stops her when she attempts to kiss him. In November, Colin acquires a younger boyfriend named Barry Clark (Gary Hailes). They move in together and when Dot Cotton (June Brown) discovers they are sharing a bed, she is mortified and spreads rumours that Colin has AIDS. Some of the community shun Colin, refusing to speak to him as a result. Despite this altercation, Colin and Dot forge a close friendship when Colin supports Dot following her husband Charlie Cotton's (Christopher Hancock) bigamy.

Colin and Barry. Their gay relationship was one of the more controversial storylines in 1987. Colin's kiss on Barry's forehead (17 November 1987) caused numerous complaints.

Barry causes Colin problems by interfering with his work, deliberately making him jealous, and engaging in criminal antics with villainous Nick Cotton (John Altman) leaving Colin to pay for the damages. Further problems arise when Colin is called for jury service in 1987. The defendant is a member of the gangster organisation known as The Firm, and when Colin refuses to give a verdict of not guilty at the trial, Colin's flat is vandalised by Brad Williams (Jonathan Stratt). Colin calls the police, but they are more concerned about Colin's relationship with Barry than actually catching the vandals. They discover that Barry was under the age of legal sexual consent for homosexual sex when he and Colin began living together, and the police decide to inform Barry's parents (in 1987 the legal age of sexual consent for gay men was 21). Barry is petrified of his homophobic father and decides to end his relationship with Colin.

Colin grows depressed, which worsens when he is mugged in an alley and beaten up, and he suffers a spell of poor health in 1988 after his eyesight starts giving him trouble, he gets unexplained dizzy spells and occasionally cannot move his legs. Colin fears he has AIDS, however tests confirm that he has multiple sclerosis. Colin's GP, Harold Legg (Leonard Fenton), decides that it is in Colin's best interests not to tell him the diagnosis, fearing the worry may bring on another attack prematurely. He tells Colin he is overworked and anaemic. Colin starts enjoying a social life again. At a party he meets a new business contact, Guido Smith (Nicholas Donovan), who becomes a romantic interest and moves in with Colin.

However, in January 1989, Colin's health deteriorates, and Legg finally reveals that he has MS. Colin is furious at Dr. Legg for lying and threatens to report him to the authorities. Colin spends weeks coming to terms with the news, but Guido stands by him and Colin eventually accepts his condition. Problems arise in Colin and Guido's relationship in 1989; Colin begins to believe that Guido is only staying with him out of pity. Colin decides to move to his brother's house in Bristol. He opts not to tell Guido that he is going, but a surprise visit from Barry stalls his departure and Guido comes home to see Colin packed and ready to leave. Colin tells Guido that he needs some space and asks him to look after his flat whilst he sorts himself out. He then leaves Walford whilst his friends wave him goodbye.

=== 2016–2022 ===
Twenty-seven years later, in September 2016, Dot discovers that Colin is marrying a man called Eddie Tsang (Kevin Shen) and has invited her to his wedding, which she accepts, but then has doubts as she still believes that same-sex marriage is wrong, due to her religious beliefs; despite accepting gay relationships. Colin arrives at Dot's house, saying he had a feeling she would not go to the wedding. Colin visits The Queen Victoria public house and witnesses the funeral of Paul Coker (Jonny Labey), who was killed in a homophobic attack, and laments to another gay man, Johnny Carter (Ted Reilly), of the homophobia in the world, but is comforted by the majority of gay acceptance. After exchanging memories, Dot agrees to attend the wedding, much to Colin's delight. He attends Dot's funeral in December 2022 and reunites with Sharon Watts (Letitia Dean). He reveals that Eddie has since died from cancer, and that he has reunited with Barry.

== Reception ==
In 2020, Sara Wallis and Ian Hyland from The Daily Mirror placed Colin 85th on their ranked list of the best EastEnders characters of all time, commenting on how he was the soap's first gay character and how his storylines highlighted homophobia, as well as his kiss with Barry being the first gay kiss on a British soap opera.

== See also ==
- List of LGBT characters in television and radio
- List of soap operas with LGBT characters
