= James Hatfield =

American writer (1958–2001)

James Howard Hatfield (January 7, 1958 – July 18, 2001) was an American author.

== Fortunate Son and controversy ==
Hatfield was the author of Fortunate Son, a book published in 1999 during the George W. Bush presidential campaign, 2000 that made serious allegations about George W. Bush. Published by the highly regarded St. Martin's Press, the book was revealed as allegedly fraudulent and recalled by the publisher within days of publication.

Soon after the book's release, The Dallas Morning News reported that Hatfield was a paroled felon who had been convicted in 1988 of paying a hit man $5,000 to murder his former boss with a car bomb. It was also revealed that Hatfield pleaded guilty to embezzlement in 1992. Hatfield at first denied the allegations when his publisher confronted him, but he eventually owned up to his criminal history.

This was the second time that a book of Hatfield's had been challenged. In 1985 he had written an unofficial James Bond novel, The Killing Zone, which – although purporting to be officially sanctioned by Glidrose, Bond's literary copyright holder – was a vanity novel.

Due to the revelations of Hatfield's criminal past and the damage to his credibility, in October 1999, Hatfield's publisher, St. Martin's Press, recalled 70,000 copies of Fortunate Son and left an additional 20,000 books in storage. Even so, the book had already reached the New York Times bestseller list. Hatfield responded that before the Bush campaign brought pressure to bear, St. Martin's had publicly stated that the book had been "carefully fact-checked and scrutinized by lawyers."

The book was later republished by Soft Skull Press. The relationship between Sander Hicks, founder of Soft Skull Press, and Hatfield was explored in the movie Horns and Halos, an award-winning documentary film directed by Suki Hawley and Michael Galinsky. In one scene from the DVD extra disc, Hatfield says to the camera, "If anything happens to me, get it out to the press."

== Death ==
According to Detective John Hubbard of the Bentonville, Arkansas Police Department, on July 17, 2001, the Police went to Hatfield's house to arrest him on charges of credit card fraud but they were unable to locate him.

On July 18, 2001, Hatfield's body was found by a hotel housekeeper in room 312 at a Days Inn in Springdale, Arkansas, an apparent suicide by prescription drug overdose. According to the police, notes were left listing alcohol, financial problems and Fortunate Son as reasons for killing himself.

== Bibliography ==
- Fortunate Son: George W. Bush and the Making of an American President. (1999). Soft Skull Press. ISBN 1-887128-84-0 (third edition, 2002)
