= Suki Hawley =

American filmmaker (born 1969)

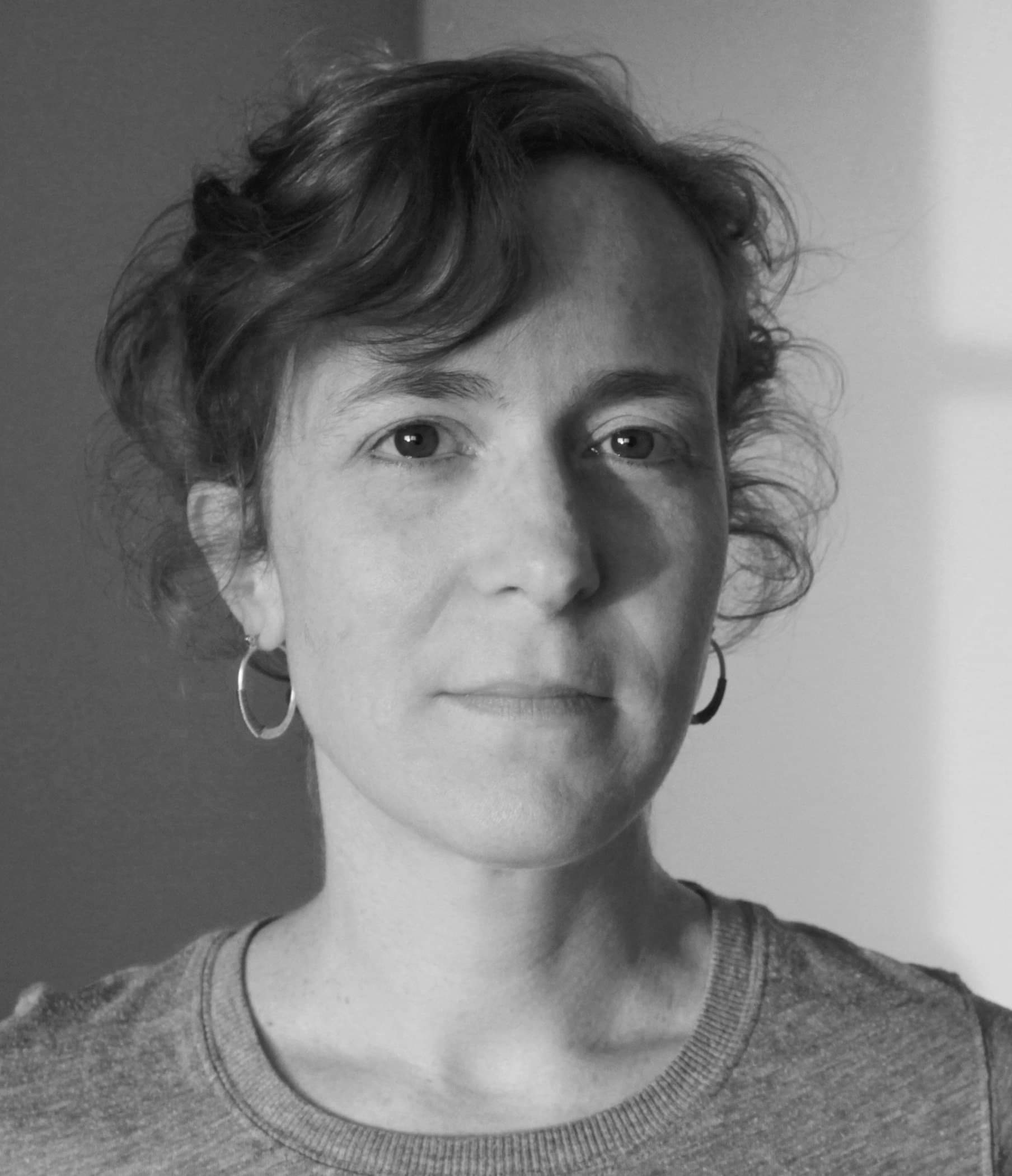
- Born: 1969 (age 56–57); Dallas, Texas
- Education: Wesleyan University
- Occupations: Filmmaker, Editor
- Relatives: Michael Galinsky (husband), Adam Galinsky (brother in law)

Suki Hawley is an American indie filmmaker and a partner in the production and distribution company RUMUR. Either solo or with Michael Galinsky, she has directed low-budget fictional narratives but has mostly concentrated on documentaries in recent years.

== Early life and education ==
Hawley is a native of Dallas, Texas, where she was born in 1969. In her youth, she enjoyed playing video games. She has referred to her interest in filmmaking as an extension of her early interest in video games. “They involve the same skills – rhythm, pushing buttons, fast thinking to solve problems.” Hawley attended The Hockaday School in Dallas where she began video editing in high school. “I knew I was hooked, so I chose a school that had a strong film department and took as many film classes as I could, both theory and production – probably more classes just watching movies. The school I chose had a heavy bent toward the old Hollywood Classics – comedy, noir, dramas.” That school was Wesleyan University where Hawley studied under the tutelage of film historian Jeanine Basinger.

== Career ==
After graduating from college, Hawley moved to Los Angeles where she worked as an assistant editor in the cutting room of Roger Corman’s Venice studio. In 1992 and ’93, she worked at the Sundance Film Festival in the box office and as a director of housing at the 1992 Summer Director and Screenwriters Labs. Moving to New York to attend film school, Hawley worked as an intern in the office of Christine Vachon and Todd Haynes’ company Apparatus Films. She was assistant to the director Daisy von Scherler Mayer on the production of the indie film Party Girl (1995 film). It was at a lunch break on set one day that Galinsky “talked her into dropping out [of film school] so that [they] could make a film instead.”

Hawley has been making films with Michael Galinsky since 1994. Their first two films, Half-Cocked (film) (1994) and Radiation (1999), were narrative features. They were followed by the documentary Horns and Halos (2002), which they made in partnership with David Beilinson. Soon after, they formed Rumur, a collaborative production studio. Hawley served as co-director and editor of Half-Cocked (film) (1994), Radiation (1999), Lee Hazlewood in New York (2001), Horns and Halos (film) (2002), Code 33 (2005), Miami Manhunt (2008), Battle for Brooklyn (2011), Who Took Johnny (2013), 30 for 30 Shorts: The Sweat Solution (2015), All the Rage: Saved by Sarno (2016), Working in Protest(2017), and The Commons (2019). She served as an editor on American Cannibal: The Road to Reality (2006) and co-producer on Trouble on the Corner (1997). She received a writing credit on Half-Cocked (1994) and Radiation (1999).

Hawley's and Galinsky's films have screened at scores of festivals around the world, including South by Southwest, International Film Festival Rotterdam, Toronto International Film Festival, Sundance Film Festival, Slamdance, and the New York Underground Film Festival. Their film Who Took Johnny (2014) was included in Artforum International’s annual top 10 by John Waters who called it “An amazing, lunatic head-scratcher of a documentary about missing children with plot twists that will leave you creeped out, surprised, and excited. As good as Capturing the Friedmans!" Mr. Waters also invited the film to screen at The 60th Thessaloniki Film Festival in a special program of his 10 favorite films.

Two of their films have been on the Academy Award shortlist for Best Documentary Feature, Battle For Brooklyn in 2011 and Horns and Halos in 2003

Since 2017, Suki has been a programmer on the Narrative Feature Programming Committee at the Slamdance Film Festival.

In 2020, Suki and partners Michael Galinsky and David Beilinson executive produced their first podcast series with “Relative Unknown,” produced by C13Originals, in partnership with Rumur Inc.

== Filmography ==
- The Commons (2019, Documentary Feature)
- Working in Protest (2017, Documentary Feature)
- All the Rage (2016, Documentary Feature)
- Who Took Johnny (2014, Documentary Feature)
- Battle for Brooklyn (2011, Documentary Feature)
- Miami Manhunt (2006, Documentary Feature)
- American Cannibal: The Road to Reality (2006, Documentary Feature) Editor
- Code 33 (2005, Documentary Feature)
- Horns and Halos (2002, Documentary Feature)
- Lee Hazlewood in New York (2001, Documentary Short) Director/Editor
- Insound Presents (2000-2001, Documentary Musical Shorts) Editor
- Radiation (1999, Narrative Feature)
- Half-Cocked (1995, Narrative Feature)
