= The Killing Zone =

Book by James Hatfield

- Author: Jim Hatfield
- Language: English
- Series: James Bond (unofficial)
- Genre: Spy novel
- Publisher: "A Charter Book"
- Publication date: 1985
- Publication place: United States
- Media type: Print (paperback)

The Killing Zone is an unauthorised James Bond novel by Jim Hatfield. It was privately published in paperback in 1985 under the guise that it was officially sanctioned by Glidrose Publications (later Ian Fleming Publications), the company that held the rights to publish James Bond literary works. At the time, the official author of the Bond series was John Gardner who wrote from 1981 to 1996.

It was first published in the United Kingdom as "A Charter Book" but is no longer in print.

== Plot ==
The novel begins with the murder of Bill Tanner by Klaus Doberman, a German-South American drug lord. Enraged by his friend's death, Bond disobeys his official orders to get revenge. According to the cover blurb on the back of the book, "In this new high voltage spy thriller, Secret Agent 007 must "liquidate" ruthless billionaire kingpin Klaus Doberman. But James Bond has his hands full as he battles a luscious lady assassin who offers lethal love Russian style and a slit-eyed Oriental sadist who is an elusive and deadly Ninja. Aided by his confederate Lotta Head and his old CIA buddy Felix Leiter, 007 is pitted against Klaus Doberman in his heavily armed fortress high in the Mexican Sierra Madres ... in the most bloodcurdling death duel in the great Bond saga."

== See also ==
- Outline of James Bond
