= Fortunate Son (Hatfield book) =

2000 biography of George W. Bush by J.H. Hatfield

- Author: J. H. Hatfield
- Language: English
- Genre: Biography
- Publisher: St. Martin's Press
- Publication date: 1999
- Publication place: United States

Fortunate Son is a controversial biography of the former American president George W. Bush by J.H. Hatfield. The book was published in 1999 during the run-up to Bush's candidacy in the United States 2000 presidential election by St. Martin's Press, and retracted by the publisher.

The book alleges that Bush received preferential treatment throughout his life, from his early schooling at Andover, Yale and Harvard, to his business connections in Midland, Texas, and his personal ownership interest in the Texas Rangers baseball team, to his candidacy for Governor and President. Hatfield argues that Bush succeeded in life not on merit, but on family connections alone, as a member of a modern oligarchy.

Soon after the book's release, The Dallas Morning News reported that Hatfield was a paroled felon who had been convicted in 1988 of paying a hit man $5,000 to murder his former boss with a car bomb. It was also revealed that Hatfield pleaded guilty to embezzlement in 1992. Hatfield at first denied the allegations when his publisher confronted him, but he eventually owned up to his criminal history.

Bush stated, regarding Hatfield:

Obviously if he's a convicted felon, his credibility is nothing, but his credibility was nothing with me to begin with because his story was totally ridiculous...

Hatfield stated in a later interview that the book had been "carefully fact-checked and scrutinized by lawyers" before the Bush campaign brought pressure to bear, as publicly stated by St. Martin's Press.

Due to the revelations of Hatfield's criminal past, and the damage to his credibility, in October 1999, Hatfield's publisher, St. Martin's Press, recalled 70,000 copies of Fortunate Son and left an additional 20,000 books in storage. Even so, the book had already reached the New York Times bestseller list. The book was later republished by Soft Skull Press.

Hatfield died on July 18, 2001, in what was apparently a suicide, dying of an overdose of prescription drugs. Police reports cited the events occurring in the aftermath of Fortunate Son's publication as a reason for taking his own life.

== Bibliography ==
- Fortunate Son: George W. Bush and the Making of an American President. (1999). Soft Skull Press. ISBN 1-887128-84-0 (3rd edition, 2002)
