= Michael Cashman =

British politician and actor (born 1950)

The Right Honourable The Lord Cashman CBE
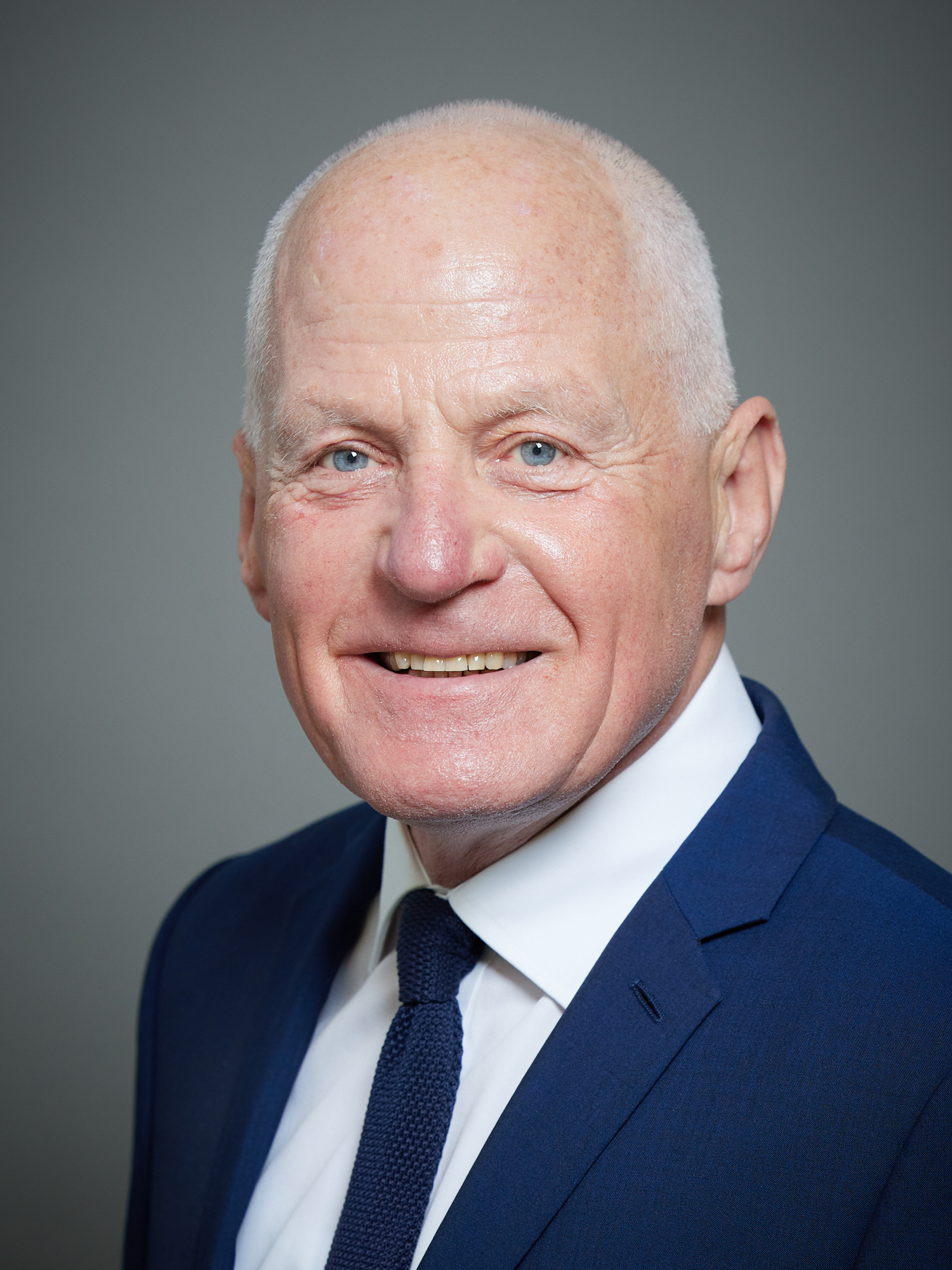
- Official portrait, 2022

Member of the House of Lords
- Lord Temporal
- Life peerage 23 September 2014

Member of the European Parliament for West Midlands
- In office 10 June 1999 – 26 May 2014

Personal details
- Born: 17 December 1950 (age 75) Limehouse, London, England
- Party: Non-affiliated (May 2019–January 2022, since June 2024)
- Other political affiliations: Labour
- Domestic partner: Paul Cottingham (1983–2014; his death)
- Profession: Actor

Colin Michael Maurice Cashman, Baron Cashman (born 17 December 1950) is a British actor, dancer, politician, and LGBTQ rights activist. A member of the Labour Party, he served as a Member of the European Parliament for the West Midlands from 1999 to 2014. He has been a member of the House of Lords since 2014. He is a patron of Humanists UK.

== Acting ==
A former child actor, Cashman had a long career, principally on television in supporting roles. His first television appearance was in the 14th episode "The Tin God" of the ITC series Gideon's Way filmed in 1964 and aired in 1965. He appeared with the National Youth Theatre in Zigger Zagger at the Strand Theatre in the West End in March 1968. In 1980, Cashman was a regular in series two and three of ITV's The Sandbaggers as Mike Wallace, codenamed Sandbagger 2 (initially Sandbagger 3). He also played First Officer Bilton in the Doctor Who serial Time-Flight in March 1982.

Cashman had been in the business for more than 20 years when he landed the role of Colin Russell in the BBC's soap opera EastEnders in 1986. In 1989, the character had the first same-sex mouth-to-mouth kiss in a British soap, watched by an estimated 17 million people and leading to some MPs calling for EastEnders to be taken off-air. He remained a regular character in the series until 1989. He also appeared at the National Theatre in Martin Sherman's play Bent with Ian McKellen, where his understudy was Christopher Eccleston. It was announced on 25 August 2016 that Cashman would reprise his role as Colin Russell in EastEnders for two episodes in September. Cashman briefly reprised the role again in 2022 for the funeral of Dot Branning (June Brown).

== Politics ==
Cashman is a founder of Stonewall, an honorary associate of the National Secular Society, a patron of The Food Chain, a London-based HIV charity, and a patron of LGBT Labour.

In the European Parliament, he was Labour spokesman on human rights. A member of the Civil Liberties Committee, Cashman was rapporteur on several key initiatives including an initiative on funerals of those who die in third countries.

He is a trenchant critic of discrimination against minorities within the European Union. He led a cross-party coalition to tackle the rise in homophobia throughout Europe. He has in the past supported the gay pride march in Warsaw, which he attended. He was also the president of the European Parliament's Intergroup on gay and lesbian issues. Cashman was a member of the ACP–EU Joint Parliamentary Assembly. In 2014, he criticised McDonald's, Coca-Cola and Visa Inc. during a session of parliament in protest at their sponsorship of the 2014 Winter Olympics taking place in Sochi, Russia, despite Vladimir Putin having recently introduced legislation against the LGBTQ community. Cashman cut up his Visa card during the session.

In 2007, he was awarded an honorary doctorate from the University of Staffordshire for his human rights work. That same year he was elected MEP of the Year for Justice and Fundamental Rights by his peers. Cashman was appointed Commander of the Order of the British Empire (CBE) in the 2013 New Year Honours for public and political service.

It was reported on 8 August 2014 Cashman was to be among 22 new life peers announced by the government. On 23 September 2014, he was created a life peer taking the title Baron Cashman, of Limehouse in the London Borough of Tower Hamlets, which is also his birthplace. On the same day, Cashman was appointed Labour's special envoy on LGBTQ issues worldwide.

In June 2015, Cashman announced his involvement and investment in SuitLink Ltd., a global LGBTQ and ally professional social network.

In 2007, Cashman supported Alan Johnson for the deputy leadership of the Labour Party. In 2010, he supported David Miliband for the leadership of the party. In 2015, Cashman supported Yvette Cooper for the leadership. He supported Sadiq Khan in his bid for Mayor of London.

Cashman released his memoir One of Them: From Albert Square to Parliament Square with Bloomsbury Publishing in February 2020. It was shortlisted for the 2021 RSL Christopher Bland Prize.

He resigned from the Labour Party on 22 May 2019 in opposition to Brexit, and offered his support to the Liberal Democrats. He sat in the Lords as a non-affiliated peer, before returning to Labour on 11 January 2022.

In June 2024, he apologised on X after a tweet in which he mocked "anti-trans" Labour MP Rosie Duffield's claimed concerns for her own security during the general election campaign. Shortly afterwards, he lost the Labour whip with Sir Keir Starmer saying Cashman's comments were "totally inappropriate".

== Personal life ==
Cashman registered a civil partnership with Paul Cottingham, his partner of more than twenty years, on 11 March 2006. They were together a total of 31 years before Cottingham died. They were introduced in 1983 by Barbara Windsor. A fellow actor and humanitarian activist, Cottingham also worked for the Labour Party as High Value fundraiser and for Britain in Europe, and became Cashman's researcher during his time in the European Parliament. In March 2011, he was diagnosed with a very rare cancer, angiosarcoma, and died on 23 October 2014 at the Royal Marsden Hospital, London. He was cremated in a humanist service at the City of London Crematorium on 7 November 2014.

Party political offices
Preceded by New position	European Parliamentary representative on the National Executive Committee of the Labour Party; 2001 – 2012	Succeeded by Glenis Willmott
Orders of precedence in the United Kingdom
Preceded by The Lord Lennie	Gentlemen; Baron Cashman	Followed by The Lord Callanan
