= Michael Galinsky =

American filmmaker (born 1969)

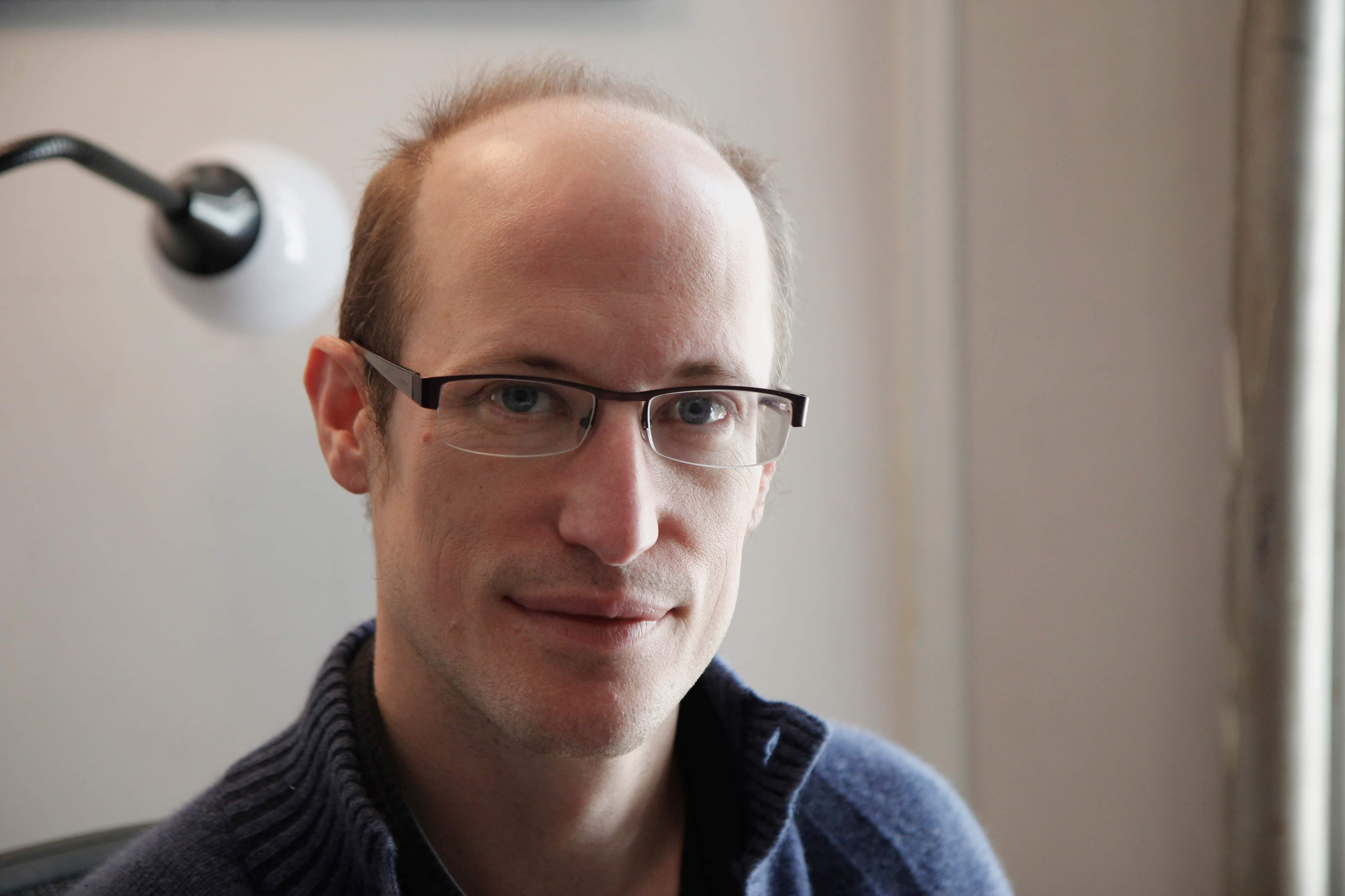
- Born: 1969 (age 56–57); Chapel Hill, North Carolina
- Education: New York University (BA)
- Occupations: Filmmaker, cinematographer, photographer
- Relatives: Suki Hawley wife and partner, Adam Galinsky (brother)

Michael Galinsky (born 1969) is an American filmmaker, cinematographer, photographer, and musician who has produced and directed a number of documentaries, several of them in collaboration with his now-wife, Suki Hawley. With their partner David Beilinson, they run a production and distribution company called Rumur.

== Early life and education ==
Galinsky is a native of Chapel Hill, North Carolina, where he was born in 1969. In his youth he enjoyed basketball, biking, reading, and eventually found interest in photography. His twin brother is the noted social psychologist, Adam Galinsky.

He attended New York University, from which he graduated Phi Beta Kappa in religious studies. “I was interested in photography,” he later told an interviewer, “but felt odd about going to art school, so I went to a college that had a lot of photography classes and took 1 a year” while pursuing a religious studies major. “So I basically minored in photo....I ended up auditing a film production class after college for a few weeks. At the time I was working as a production assistant on films”.

== Career ==
After graduating from college, he was “working as a PA and basic all-around grunt” and “was also doing some photo work and wanted to make films.” When he met Hawley at a party, she was a film-school student, and he “talked her into dropping out so that [they] could make a film instead. [He] knew that no one else would give [him] the chance to shoot.”

Galinsky has been making films with Suki Hawley since 1994. Their first two films, Half-Cocked (1994) and Radiation (1999), were narrative features. They were followed by the documentary Horns and Halos (2002), which they made in partnership with David Beilinson. Soon after, they formed Rumur, a collaborative production studio.

Galinsky served as producer and director or co-director of Radiation (1999), Horns and Halos (2002), Code 33 (2005), Miami Manhunt (2008), Battle for Brooklyn (2011), and Who Took Johnny (2013).

He has worked as a cinematographer, cameraman, or director of photography on all of the above films, as well as on Half-Cocked (1994), Texas Gold (2005), August in the Empire State (2006), Lucky Lake (2006), and Repeat Attenders (2014).

He received a writing credit on Half-Cocked (1994), Radiation (1999), and Knives in My Throat: The Year I Survived While My Mind Tried to Kill Me (2005).

He was also credited with sound and sound design on Code 33 and as composer of the musical score for Half-Cocked.

Galinsky's and Hawley's films have been screen at scores of festivals around the world, including South by Southwest, Rotterdam, Toronto, Sundance, Slamdance, and the New York Underground Film Festival.

Galinsky has said that he considers it important for a filmmaker “to have a good understanding of how images get made because then you have a certain amount of control over how a project will look.” He also believes that “good filmmaking requires a combo of intuition and knowledge. Without intuition, the film will lack heart and without at least some knowledge it won’t cut together. At the same time, if the knowledge of craft overwhelms the intuition one ends up with something that looks and feels like a commercial.” He has cited the Maysles brothers and John Cassavetes as major influences. As for his collaboration with Hawley, he has described them as having “very different – complementary strengths. Suki is a very good editor and organizer of thoughts and I have a bunch of crazy ones. She’s the one who really pulls things together.”

== Rumur ==
The Rumur team consists of Galinsky, Hawley, and Beilinson, who formerly worked at PBS and Miramax. In addition to producing and distributing Galinsky and Hawley's films, Rumur has created music videos for such performers as Alana Newman and Jacob Miller. Rumur also made the 2005 Iraq War documentary Occupation: Dreamland, directed by Ian Olds and Garrett Scott.

== Films ==
=== Half-Cocked ===
Half-Cocked (1994) is a documentary-style fictional film that was written by Galinsky and Hawley, directed by Hawley, and filmed by Galinsky. It featured the music of several rock groups, including Galinsky's own band, Sleepyhead, in which he played bass. Galinsky has explained that he had taken classes in documentary photography and Hawley had “studied classic Hollywood film at Wesleyan,” and in Half-Cocked they “were trying to...kind of marry the two...to make a narrative film that had that kind of humor of Billy Wilder but that was also capturing something that wasn't going to be there.”

Although the film was not picked up for film festivals at the time, it was screened in rock clubs around the world and has since gained admiring attention in many quarters. It has been described as a “cult indie music film.” Reviewer Mike Everleth called it “a right-on piece of genius” and “the definitive early ’90s indie rock film...a fictional story starring real life indie rock musicians, many playing either themselves or characters based on themselves.” A writer for the Austin Chronicle described Half-Cocked as a “tasty nugget of mid-Nineties apathy,” noting that “this isn't some preachy flick of finicky teens making it in the world” but, rather, “a time capsule full of heart and hope, and underneath all the drama, right there in grainy black and white, is the real documentary of coming of age in the transition time between angst and responsibility.”

=== Radiation ===
Like Half-Cocked, Radiation (1999) is a fictional narrative shot in a documentary style. Filmed in Madrid and Barcelona, it is about the mishaps of a Spanish music promoter named Unai. The film was shown at over 40 festivals in the U.S. and abroad, including Sundance, New York Underground, and South by Southwest.

=== Horns and Halos ===
Directed by Galinsky and Hawley, Horns and Halos (2002) is a documentary about “the intrigue surrounding the publication of the controversial book Fortunate Son, a biography of George W. Bush,” which its first publisher, St. Martin's Press, withdrew from sale “after controversy arose over a passage accusing Bush of being a convicted drug user”; the book was then re-published by a small publishing house, Soft Skull Press. The film, which opened the 9th New York Underground Film Festival, was praised in the Underground Film Journal for “remaining amazingly unbiased towards the subject matter.” It is discussed in some detail in the book Cinema Wars: Hollywood Film and Politics in the Bush-Cheney Era by Douglas M. Kellner.

On September 11, 2011, article, Galinsky recalled that on September 10, 2001, “my partners and I shot the final scene of our film, Horns and Halos,” and “stayed up late that night working with the footage.” The next morning, when the first plane hit the World Trade Center, “the impact caused our cats to jump off the bed and our dog to sit up, which roused us.” After finding out what was happening, they walked to Fort Greene Park to “see it for real from the top of the hill.” Galinsky had “consciously not taken my camera that morning as I left the house” because he felt “that taking pictures would take me out of the moment, or that it would be exploitative in some way.” He then made his way to Downtown Brooklyn to donate blood.

During the next few days, they returned to work on the film. “On Sept. 10 George W. Bush was seen as something of a clown by many people. On Sept. 11 he didn’t fare too well either. However, by Sept. 14 or 15 the drumbeat of patriotism had become deafening.” As a result, Galinsky and Hawley “had a hard time getting anyone interested in a documentary that was even mildly critical of Bush....We finished the film on March 5, 2002 and our daughter was born five hours later.” Galinsky closes by lamenting the “outsized sense of patriotism” that ended up costing America “thousands of young men and women” and “trillions of dollars in resources.”

=== Code 33 ===
Code 33 (2005) is set in the summer of 2003 and follows two Miami cops' pursuit of a serial rapist in Little Havana.

=== August in the Empire State ===
Galinsky co-directed and photographed August in the Empire State (2006), a documentary about events surrounding the 2004 Republican National Convention.

=== Miami Manhunt ===
Galinsky co-directed and photographed Miami Manhunt (2008), a true-crime special for the A&E Network. It followed the investigation of a serial rapist.

=== Battle for Brooklyn ===
Battle for Brooklyn (2011) is a documentary directed by Galinsky, Suki Hawley, and Beilinson. It depicts the long-term legal battle waged by owners and residents whose property was at risk of being condemned to make way for the Atlantic Yards project, a plan to build 16 skyscrapers and a basketball arena for the New Jersey Nets in Brooklyn. The filmmakers raised $25,000 on Kickstarter in the fall of 2009 to make the film.

A writer for the Underground Film Journal called it an “insanely epic documentary” and “a classic American tale of the underdog fighting entrenched moneyed and political interests.” It has also been described as “powerhouse documentary” and “a ’70s Sidney Lumet film made real” that “gives us the perfect everyman hero to root for at its center....If there ever were a film to inspire the seemingly powerless masses to rise up and fight back against big business and the politicians who lie in bed with them, it would be Battle for Brooklyn.” The Chicago Reader called the film “valuable for its cold-eyed look at how real estate interests work the levers of power in state and city government, dangling the vague promise of job creation in exchange for sweetheart deals that drain the public coffers.” Hawley told IndyWeek that “conservatives love the movie and liberals love the movie, because everybody hates kleptocracy....They hate corruption. And that's what this movie tells.” It was shown at the 2012 Revelation Perth International Film Festival and the 2011 Chicago Underground Film Festival, played at venues in over twenty cities, including the Laemmle Music Hall in Los Angeles, and was aired on PBS. It won many awards, was named one of the fifteen notable films of 2012 by the American Library Association, and was shortlisted for an Oscar.

=== All the Rage ===
All the Rage (2016) is a documentary about Dr. John Sarno and his philosophy that back pain is caused by mind-body interactions.

=== The Commons ===
The Commons (2019) is a documentary about protests concerning the controversial Silent Sam monument at the University of North Carolina at Chapel Hill.

After a screening at the 2019 True/False Film Festival, Courtney Symone Staton, filmmaker, and UNC student, came on stage during the Q&A to read a statement from the activists leading the protest captured in The Commons. The statement read that several of the activists featured in the film were not aware of the film's existence nor were they aware that it was finished and screening at a major festival. The statement also read that Galinsky and co-director Hawley mentioned the existence of a "student film" multiple times at a previous Q&A. Staton and other activists directed this film titled Silence Sam.

== Writings ==
=== Malls across America ===
In 1989, when Galinsky was 20 years old, he and a friend spent six weeks driving across the U.S., taking pictures in malls. “At the time, the mall was the new public space, the new community center where people would interact,” Galinsky later said. “This was pre-Internet, pre-cellphone, there was smoking in malls, it was before the Gulf War. It was this weird moment in time where things were getting ready to change.” Over the years, many of these pictures have been reproduced in various publications and on a number of websites. One critic has commented that Galinsky captured, in these pictures, “in a beautifully off-kilter high-flash way, the cool ugliness of suburban style.” Another has written that “What makes these photos so appealing and oddly touching is the nostalgia bound up in them....They are from a not so distant past....The collection is imbued with a sense of the everyday melancholy but also manage to be a pop-anthropological feast.” A collection of some of these photographs, Malls Across America, was published by Steidl in October 2013.

=== Other Writings ===
In May 2013, Galinsky wrote a detailed appraisal of the films at that year's Tribeca Film Festival.

Since June 2009, Galinsky has regularly contributed articles and videos to The Local, a New York Times sub-website about Fort Greene news. He has reported on community meetings, done restaurant reviewing, discussed school reform, and addressed various other local issues. In September 2012 he posted a video of the ribbon-cutting at the Barclays Center this morning for the arena's formal ribbon-cutting and Michael Galinsky, filmmaker and contributor to The Local, captured the scene on camera. He has also contributed an update on the Atlantic Yards project.

== Other professional activities ==
Galinsky took part in a festival called The Art of Social Justice at the American University of Iraq, which addressed the question: “how can artistic expression help to foster social justice in Iraqi society?”

Galinsky is a contributing editor for International Documentary Magazine, for which he writes about filmmaking and film distribution.

== Honors and awards ==
Battle for Brooklyn won the Grand Chameleon Award (Best Film) and Best Documentary Award at the 2011 Brooklyn Film Festival.

The American Library Association named Battle for Brooklyn one of fifteen notable films of 2012

Galinsky won a Guggenheim Foundation fellowship in 2012. He and Hawley planned to use the grant money to make a film entitled Conception, about family.

Battle for Brooklyn was shortlisted for an Academy Award for Best Documentary.

Battle for Brooklyn was named runner-up for the Underground Film Journal’s Movie of the Year for 2011.

== Future projects ==
Reportedly, Galinsky and Hawley are currently working on Story of Pain, a film about the work of Dr. John E. Sarno.

== Personal life ==
Galinsky and Hawley lived for many years on the Lower East Side of Manhattan, then moved to Bedford Avenue in Williamsburg, Brooklyn. They were married in the late 1990s and in 1999 bought a house in the Brooklyn neighborhood of Clinton Hill. They have two daughters. They currently reside in Chapel Hill, NC in the house that he grew up in.

Galinsky's twin brother Adam is a professor at Columbia Business School.
