= Donna Ludlow =

Fictional character from EastEnders

- EastEnders character
- Portrayed by: Matilda Ziegler
- Duration: 1987–1989
- First appearance: Episode 265; 27 August 1987
- Last appearance: Episode 437; 13 April 1989
- Introduced by: Julia Smith
In-universe information
- Occupation: Shop assistant Prostitute; Barmaid
- Father: Marcus Duffy
- Mother: Kathy Beale
- Adoptive father: Gerald Ludlow
- Adoptive mother: Mrs Ludlow
- Stepfather: Pete Beale
- Half-brothers: Ian Beale; Ben Mitchell
- Uncles: Ted Hills
- Nephews: Peter Beale; Bobby Beale; Steven Beale (adoptive)
- Nieces: Lucy Beale; Lexi Pearce
- First cousins: Tony Hills; Sarah Hills
- Other relatives: Louie Beale; Jimmy Beale

Donna Ludlow is a fictional character from the BBC soap opera EastEnders, played by Matilda Ziegler. She appears between episodes 265 and 437 of EastEnders, originally appearing on screen from 27 August 1987 to 13 April 1989. Donna was scripted as a deeply troubled individual, desperate for love and attention, but shunned by almost all who encountered her. In her storyline, after finding out she was conceived from rape and then rejected by her biological mother, Kathy (Gillian Taylforth), Donna sets herself on a path of self-destruction. She turns to manipulation, blackmail and prostitution to fund her drug-habit, before suffering a heroin overdose and choking to death on her own vomit in 1989.

== Creation and development ==
Introduced in August 1987, Donna was brought in as an apparent stranger, seemingly unrelated to any other characters in the Square. However, Donna was actually the illegitimate daughter of one of the regular characters, Kathy Beale (Gillian Taylforth). According to Kathy's backstory, which was scripted prior to the events of the programme's beginning, she had been raped as a teenager and gave her baby up for adoption: Donna was this child, now grown. Donna's first appearance had been primed by her godmother visiting Kathy on Donna's behest as she hoped to meet her estranged mother. Kathy's response was that she wanted no contact with Donna, leading viewers into thinking Kathy would not meet her daughter. When Donna first appeared months later, her identity as Kathy's daughter was not divulged to viewers. According to writer Colin Brake, Donna's entrance was meticulously planned to avoid giving away the secret of her identity too soon, with actress Ziegler asked by producers to dye her naturally fair hair dark to avoid any perceived resemblance to Kathy. Scriptwriters quickly established Donna as a compulsive liar, telling different people different versions of her past—never the truth. Despite this, Brake has claimed that "some quick viewers still guessed the truth" earlier than had been hoped. When Donna's real identity was revealed onscreen the following year, in April 1988, Kathy's immediate rejection of her sent her narrative spiraling downward.

Author Hilary Kingsley has described Donna as "the complete reverse of her mother. Cunning and dishonest, she was ready to steal, cheat, and prostitute herself to gain some sort of place in Albert Square society". Kingsley added: "Donna used everyone" and was a "good manipulator". Author Kate Lock branded Donna "pinched-faced [...] a proficient liar and cheat [who] became truly evil." Writer Rupert Smith has classified Donna as a "Lost Girl" who could not "take the rough and tumble of life in the East End... [a] broken blossom [...] tragic and a loon."

One of the issues the character of Donna dealt with was drug abuse. Brake stated that, for the first time, EastEnders told a complete drugs story "with the sad tale of Donna's descent into heroin addiction". He suggested that Matilda Ziegler's acting "gave the story credibility". The storyline featured Donna's eventual death: following months of manipulation and other antisocial behavior in Walford, Donna became unhinged by addiction as well as Kathy's rejection, taking an overdose of heroin. She was found dead, covered in her own vomit. Brake has hailed these final death scenes as "the most powerful anti-drugs images ever screened in the programme" up until that time. Kate Lock lamented that some characters felt guilty after Donna's death, "but the truth was that Donna's fate seemed to have been sealed from the moment of her disastrous conception." Rupert Smith suggested that Donna was "almost universally unmourned [...] even Kathy seemed to get over her pretty quickly".

== Storylines ==
Donna's godmother, June Watkins (Madaline Blakeney), visits Donna's biological mother, Kathy Beale (Gillian Taylforth), who gave Donna up for adoption because she was raped at the age of 14 by a man called Marcus Duffy. Donna hopes to meet Kathy and June tells Kathy this and about her life. Kathy refuses to meet her but will not say why. Undeterred, Donna moves to Walford to be near her mother.

For the first year she keeps her identity a secret and works as a barmaid at The Queen Victoria pub and takes to anonymously calling the Samaritans, where Kathy volunteers, but Kathy starts to suspect the caller's identity. Kathy becomes more concerned when Donna shows interest in her son, Ian Beale (Adam Woodyatt), and Ian seems to be attracted to her, unaware that she is his half-sister. When Kathy tells Donna to stay away from Ian, Donna finally tells her who she is. Mortified, Kathy orders Donna to leave, telling her she gave her away and wants nothing to do with her.

Hurt by such rejection, Donna retaliates by causing as much trouble for Kathy as she can. She continues to flirt with Ian, forcing Kathy to tell him who she is, and hints to Kathy's husband, Pete Beale (Peter Dean), that Kathy might be having an affair with James Willmott-Brown (William Boyde). Finally Kathy tells Donna that the reason she gave her up was because she was the product of rape. Unhinged by this bombshell, Donna goes into a downward spiral. She stalks Simon Wicks (Nick Berry) who only uses her for sex, and when he pits her against his new fling, Cindy Williams (Michelle Collins), the subsequent fights mean she loses her job at the pub; by August 1988, she is homeless. Michelle Fowler (Susan Tully) and Sharon Watts (Letitia Dean) take pity and allow her to stay with them, but after Donna tries to come between them, they throw her out. By September, she is living in an abandoned squat on the Square. After Donna's manipulations are discovered, the community shuns her. Depressed, she starts using heroin and is soon addicted and stealing to fund her habit; by December 1988, she turns to extortion.

One day, Ali Osman (Nejdet Salih) comes into the Vic to celebrate his win at the horses. His boasting attracts Donna's attention and she takes advantage of his inebriation to seduce him and threatens to tell his wife Sue Osman (Sandy Ratcliff) about the one-night stand unless he pays her regularly. But by February 1989 that well runs so dry that Donna resorts to prostitution, agreeing to sleep with her drug-dealer, Spike Murphy, in exchange for heroin. Spike brings his sleazy friends along and a vicious gang rape is only stopped by Rod Norman's (Christopher McHallem) chance appearance. Following this, Rod tries unsuccessfully to get Donna off heroin.

When Donna tells the community that her adoptive parents have been killed in a car crash, the residents of Walford take pity, donating money to help her but are incensed when her adoptive mother (Yvonne D'Alpra) arrives shortly after. Dot Cotton (June Brown) takes her in but everyone else shuns Donna; she promptly spreads rumours that Colin Russell (Michael Cashman) has AIDS and tells Sue about her affair with Ali, effectively destroying their marriage. These are hollow victories, and after Rod abandons her to go on tour, Ali attacks Donna, and Kathy rejects her yet again. Donna later overdoses on heroin and chokes to death on her own vomit. Dot finds her body on the living room floor a couple of hours later. In the months following her death, Rod and Dot blame themselves. Kathy too is left wracked with guilt for rejecting Donna.
