= Ali Osman =

- EastEnders character
- Portrayed by: Nejdet Salih
- Duration: 1985–1989
- First appearance: Episode 1 "Poor Old Reg"; 19 February 1985
- Last appearance: Episode 488; 10 October 1989
- Created by: Tony Holland and Julia Smith
- Introduced by: Julia Smith
- Book appearances: Hopes and Horizons
- Crossover appearances: Bo Selecta (2004)
In-universe information
- Occupation: Café and mini cab owner
- Father: Hassan Osman
- Brothers: Mehmet Osman
- Sisters: Ayse Osman
- Wife: Sue Osman
- Sons: Hassan Osman; Little Ali Osman
- Uncles: Ahmet Osman
- Nephews: Rayif Osman; Murat Osman
- Nieces: Emine Osman

Ali Osman is a fictional character from the BBC soap opera EastEnders, played by Nejdet Salih. He was a member of the original EastEnders cast, appearing in the first episode on 19 February 1985. He remained with the show for nearly five years afterwards, making his last appearance on 10 October 1989. Ali was scripted as happy-go-lucky, which was in stark contrast to his highly strung wife, Sue Osman (Sandy Ratcliff). Central to his storylines were his penchant for gambling, his tempestuous marriage, and the loss of his son to cot death, which was one of the first controversial storylines covered by the soap. He was created by Julia Smith and Tony Holland, the creators of EastEnders.

== Creation ==
Ali Osman was one of the original twenty-three characters invented by the creators of EastEnders, Tony Holland and Julia Smith. Ali, a Turkish Cypriot, was originally intended to be named Chris. His name was changed to Ali when it dawned on Holland that he had given a Christian name to a Muslim. Ali was a well-intentioned attempt to represent the proportion of Turkish Cypriots who had immigrated to England and settled in the East End of London. Holland and Smith knew that for the soap to succeed there needed to be a varied group of characters, so that several different sections of the audience had someone to identify with. Additionally, if the programme was to be realistic, it had to reflect the cross-section of society that actually existed in the real location. For these reasons, different sexes, ages, classes, religions and races were all included in the original character line-up. Both Holland and Smith had been at the forefront of the move towards 'integrated casting' in television and had encountered an array of ethnic diversities in the process. Even though the ethnic minority groups were deemed the hardest to research, Holland and Smith called upon their contacts to relay information about their origins and lifestyles and were then able to portray Walford's most recent immigrants more realistically.

Ali's original character outline as written by Smith and Holland appeared in an abridged form in their book, EastEnders: The Inside Story. In this passage Ali is referred to as "Chris".

"Chris is a Turkish Cypriot, his wife Sue is English, and they run the cafe just off the Square. In the evenings, Chris is also a minicab driver. They have a nine-month-old son named after Chris' dad - Hassan - and they are devoted to him....Chris was born in Cyprus in 1957. But, as it turned out in 1974, he was a Turk in a Greek zone. A refugee-camp followed. Then, the family was resettled in a Turkish zone. But, it never felt like home, and there was no money so, in 1975 they came to London...Chris married Sue in 1982...Chris is basically lazy, and a gambler. Not (yet) a compulsive gambler - but he is a passionate one...He's a bit of a peacock. He expects to be waited on hand and foot...Chris is always having to prove himself." (page 59)

The casting of Ali was a huge problem for Holland and Smith. During that time in the 80s only three Turkish-speaking actors could be located in London, and one of those was considered unsuitable. The other two, Haluk Bilginer and Nejdet Salih, were possibilities. Deciding which to cast caused major rows between Holland and Smith. Holland favoured Bilginer as he looked the part. He felt Salih did not have the physical presence needed and also believed that Sandy Ratcliff (the actress playing his on-screen wife) would "make mincemeat out of him". Smith disagreed. As Salih was actually an East Londoner whose parents were Turkish Cypriots (whilst Bilginer was Turkish) she felt he would have actual knowledge to bring to the character and wouldn't have to act the part as "he was the part". He also lived in the East End, as did his large family. To resolve the conflict both actors were given readings with Sandy Ratcliff and Salih eventually won the role following a cheeky, sexist remark aimed at Ratcliff and her tardy time-keeping. Both Holland and Smith felt this typified the character perfectly. Ironically, both actors eventually featured in the series, as Bilginer was brought back to take on the role of Ali's older brother.

Peter Batt, one of EastEnders' original scriptwriters, has alleged that he created the character of Ali, and that he was based on himself: "a lunatic fucking gambler".

== Development ==
Before the show aired, Holland and Smith had already decided that Sue and her husband would be parents to a young baby named Hassan. However, as further characters were invented they realised that there would be a total of four babies in the show: Annie Smith, Martin Fowler, Vicki Fowler and Hassan. It was decided that it would be impossible for the studios to cope with four babies, and so they invented a storyline to eliminate one of the young babies from the cast. During this time in the 1980s, the issue of cot death was extremely prominent in the British press, partly due to an increase in casualties, but also because a doctor had gone public with the accusation that parents were to blame for the tragic occurrence. Holland and Smith decided that covering this subject in the soap would be a good way of 'setting the record straight', and so it was decided that Sue and Ali's baby would die from cot death in the early months of the show. This was the first of many controversial storylines in EastEnders' history. After the storyline aired in June 1985, the show was praised by audience and press alike for the sensitive and unsensational way this harrowing subject was treated. The sudden tragedy came as a surprise to the audience, especially since the bereaved parents were a couple whose feuding, fighting ways had made them appear rather comic in the early episodes of the show. The British Cot Death Foundation initially feared that a soap opera would trivialise the subject and frighten new parents. They tried to stop the episodes from airing, but in the end they were pleased with the way the subject was handled, and provided back-up support after transmission to many viewers who wanted more information on the subject.

The character of Ali lasted in the show for over four years, remaining after the mental breakdown of his highly strung wife and depicting the plight of a single-parent father. Ali was eventually written out of the serial in 1989 following the departure of Smith and Holland from the series and the introduction of a new producer, Mike Gibbon.

== Storylines ==
Ali, a Turkish Cypriot, runs Bridge Street Café in Walford with his wife, Sue Osman (Sandy Ratcliff), and also drives a taxicab. He is a gambler and frequently holds poker games in the café after closing time and wages bets at the bookies, which is a huge source of concern for Sue. Ali rashly decides to wager his business on a bet in 1985 and wins a substantial amount of money. The Osmans are overjoyed but the next day their infant son, Hassan Osman (Michael Evangelou), is found dead in his cot. Ali and Sue spend months coming to terms with their son's death. The marriage is tested further when they try for another baby but Ali suffers impotence and questions his masculinity, resulting in him attempting to seduce other women; the desperation for a baby causes problems until Sue learns that she is pregnant again in 1987. Their second son, Little Ali Osman (Omer Mustafa Salih), is born in 1988.

When Sue begins to tire of life in Walford, Ali tries to get funds together to facilitate their move. In doing so, he runs up huge gambling debts to Joanne Francis (Pamela Salem), manager of Strokes wine bar, also a member of the criminal underworld known as The Firm. Desperate for money to hide his losses from Sue, Ali asks Ian Beale (Adam Woodyatt) for a loan. Ian agrees and charges him 10 per cent interest. Ali continues to gamble, struggling to pay Ian until he manages to win. Pleased with himself, Ali's boasting catches the attention of Donna Ludlow (Matilda Ziegler); she seduces Ali and after they have sex, Donna blackmails Ali, threatening to tell Sue unless he pays her. Ali pays but Donna tells Sue regardless when Sue insults her. Devastated, Sue turns to Ali's brother, Mehmet Osman (Haluk Bilginer), for comfort and wanting revenge, she kisses him in front of Ali. Thinking that his brother has been sleeping with his wife, Ali attacks Mehmet and banishes him from his life and after much rowing, Sue and Little Ali leave. Ali searches for Sue and eventually finds her visiting Hassan's grave and snatches Little Ali back. Losing another son makes Sue have a breakdown and she is sectioned. Now a single father, Ali struggles to keep his businesses afloat. He cannot afford the rent increase and attempts an insurance scam by torching his cafe. Ian works out that Ali started the fire deliberately and uses the situation to his advantage, forcing Ali to sign the cafe over to him. This causes a feud between them when Ali neglects to mention that the kitchen utilities were bought on hire purchase and are later repossessed. Ali struggles with juggling work and parental responsibilities. He has to resign from Frank Butcher's (Mike Reid) car lot when he discovers his child-minder is neglecting his son. He takes up mini-cabbing but when his car is stolen, he can't work so he is forced to send Little Ali to live with his parents. With no money, Ali attends a game of poker but loses to his landlord Alan McIntyre (Pip Miller), whom Ali had feuded with since 1987. As a result, Ali is evicted when he can't pay the rent. In a fury, Ali smashes up the flat with a crowbar, breaking all the windows and doors, until his family send him and Little Ali to Northern Cyprus in October 1989.

== Reception ==
It has been suggested by Comedy Central that "the tempestuous relationship between Sue and Ali Osman kept many an EastEnders viewer on the edge of their seat." The couple were described by the website as a Diet Coke version of the popular EastEnders couple, Den and Angie "running the café rather than the Queen Vic".

In 2011, an EastEnders' storyline aired featuring the character Ronnie Branning's (Samantha Womack) baby dying of a cot death and the mother subsequently swapping her dead baby with another character's child. This plot has been compared unfavourably to the Osman cot death of 1985.

In 2020, Sara Wallis and Ian Hyland from The Daily Mirror placed Ali 92nd on their ranked list of the best EastEnders characters of all time and commented that his gambling "ruined" his "rocky" marriage to Sue.
