= List of EastEnders characters introduced in 1988 =

EastEnders logo

The following is a list of characters first appearing in the BBC soap opera EastEnders in 1988, by order of first appearance.

== Sufia Karim ==
Sufia Karim is played by Rani Singh. Sufia makes her first appearance in Walford in 1988, when she moves to Walford with her husband Ashraf (Aftab Sachak) and their children Shireen (Nisha Kapur) and Sohail (Ronnie Jhutti). In 1989 she discovers that Ashraf is having an affair with a woman named Stella (Cindy O'Callaghan). This affair is eventually exposed to the community, leading to the family leaving Walford for Bristol in June 1990.

== Melody ==
Melody
- EastEnders character
- Portrayed by: Lyanne Compton
- Duration: 1988–1989
- First appearance: Episode 312; 2 February 1988
- Last appearance: Episode 495; 2 November 1989
In-universe information
- Occupation: Student

Melody (initially credited as Junior's Girlfiend), played by Lyanne Compton, is introduced in 1988 as the troublesome school friend of Junior Roberts (Aaron Carrington), on whom she has a crush. They are mischievous, doing things such as stealing dogs from their owners and then claiming rewards when they return the dogs, professing to have found them, or charging children to see a free Punch and Judy show. Melody attends the local Brownies, where she is particularly troublesome for the Brown Owl, Marge Green (Pat Coombs).

During her time in Walford, Melody is approached by a potential paedophile, who offers her sweets and a ride in his car; Melody responds by biting his hand. She reports the man to the police, but subsequently, her father prohibits her from seeing Junior for a while, though this does not last.

Melody is upset when Junior and his family move away in August 1989; they think about running away together, but are unable to set their plan in motion. Junior still visits Melody occasionally and on Halloween 1989, she and Junior dress as ghosts and throw eggs at Dot Cotton (June Brown) for refusing to offer anything desirable during their game of Trick or Treat. Following a chastising from Dot for this, Melody disappears with no explanation. Off-screen, the show acquired a new executive producer, Michael Ferguson, and many characters were dropped. According to writer Colin Brake, the storyline involving Melody and the unruly Brownies was intended to be fun, but references to Brownies behaving badly caused great offence to the Brownie movement, and an official complaint was made and upheld. The broadcasting commission said the EastEnders Brownie episodes "came near to parody," were unfair to the Brownies and harmed the Girl Guides' image. The BBC had to make a public apology for the misinterpretation of the movement. Brake has suggested that the mishap was a "salutary lesson to those [...] in the script department to be very vigilant in ensuring, as far as possible, that no group or individual was offended by an unintentional slight in a script."

== Kenny Beale ==
Kenny Beale
- EastEnders character
- Portrayed by: Michael Attwell
- First appearance: Episode 314; 9 February 1988
- Last appearance: Episode 323; 10 March 1988
- Book appearances: Home Fires Burning; Swings and Roundabouts
- Spin-off appearances: "CivvyStreet" (1988)
In-universe information
- Occupation: Swimming pool salesman
- Family: Beale
- Father: Albert Beale
- Mother: Lou Beale
- Brothers: Harry Beale; Ronnie Beale; Pete Beale
- Sisters: Maggie Flaherty; Dora Beale; Norma Beale; Pauline Fowler
- Wife: Barbara Beale
- Daughters: Elizabeth Beale
- Nephews: Ian Beale; Mark Fowler; Martin Fowler; David Wicks
- Nieces: Michelle Fowler
- Other relatives: Vicki Fowler

Kenny Beale, played by Michael Attwell, is the older brother of Pauline (Wendy Richard) and Pete Beale (Peter Dean). He had a guest stint in 1988. He was born and raised in Walford, 1941, to Albert (Gary Olsen) and Lou Beale (Anna Wing), where he lived with his family at number 45 Albert Square.

Kenny was banished from Walford in 1965, at the age of 24, when his mother caught him in bed with his brother's wife Pat (Pam St. Clement). He went to live in New Zealand, set up a business selling swimming pools, and married a New Zealander named Barbara. He didn't speak to any of his family for five years after emigrating, and after that it was only Pauline who corresponded with him.

He returns to Walford in 1988 with his daughter Elizabeth (Lucy Bayler), after his marriage has hit a rocky patch. He visits his ill mother and finds out that he has been named as the father of Pat's younger son, Simon Wicks (Nick Berry). After a month in Walford, he returns to New Zealand, saying goodbye to Simon, whose paternity has come into doubt again. He tells Simon that he hopes he is his father, although it is later revealed that Pat believes Brian Wicks (Leslie Schofield) is Simon's father.

Kenny remains off-screen following his 1988 departure and has a car accident in June 1992, prompting Pauline to travel to New Zealand and care for him. Upon Pauline's death in 2006, he sends a wreath to commemorate.

It is revealed in "CivvyStreet" that Kenny is named after his paternal grandfather, Kenneth Beale.

== Elizabeth Beale ==
Elizabeth Beale
- EastEnders character
- Portrayed by: Lucy Bayler
- First appearance: Episode 314; 9 February 1988
- Last appearance: Episode 330; 5 April 1988
In-universe information
- Occupation: Apprentice engineer
- Family: Beale
- Father: Kenny Beale
- Mother: Barbara Beale
- Grandfathers: Albert Beale
- Grandmothers: Lou Beale
- Uncles: Pete Beale
- Aunts: Pauline Fowler
- First cousins: Ian Beale; Mark Fowler; Michelle Fowler; Martin Fowler; David Wicks
- Other relatives: Vicki Fowler

Elizabeth Beale, played by Lucy Bayler, was born in New Zealand to Kenny (Michael Attwell) and Barbara Beale, and comes to Walford with Kenny when they visit her sick grandmother Lou (Anna Wing).

Elizabeth arrives in Walford with Kenny when Kenny's brother, Pete Beale (Peter Dean), finds out he is not the biological father of Simon Wicks (Nick Berry). Kenny had an affair with Pete's ex-wife, Pat Wicks (Pam St. Clement), and could be Simon's father, however, neither of them are Simon's father. Elizabeth begins an unlikely, but brief liaison with her cousin Ian (Adam Woodyatt). She stays with Pete and her aunt, Kathy Beale (Gillian Taylforth), when her father returns to New Zealand. She soon angers Ian by flirting with other men, and Pete, who is in a bad mood after arguing with Kathy, throws her out of his house when she tries to bring a friend home to stay. She returns to New Zealand and Kathy contacts Elizabeth and Kenny when Lou dies.

Lewis Knight from Radio Times opined that Elizabeth had a "regrettable romance" with Ian.

== Little Ali Osman ==
Little Ali Osman
- EastEnders character
- Portrayed by: Omer Mustafa Salih
- Duration: 1988–1989
- First appearance: Episode 327; 24 March 1988
- Last appearance: Episode 476; 29 August 1989
In-universe information
- Father: Ali Osman
- Mother: Sue Osman
- Brothers: Hassan Osman
- Uncles: Mehmet Osman
- Aunts: Ayse Osman
- First cousins: Emine Osman; Rayif Osman; Murat Osman

"Little" Ali Osman, played by Omer Mustafa Salih, is the second son born to café owners Sue and Ali Osman (Sandy Ratcliff and Nejdet Salih). He is born in March 1988 and is delivered in his parents' flat, 47B Albert Square, by Lofty Holloway (Tom Watt) and Pauline Fowler (Wendy Richard).

Following his parents' split, he and his mother leave Walford in April 1989 but Ali snatches him in May, causing Sue to have a breakdown and be sectioned. Little Ali lives with his father, who struggles as a single parent and employs an unregistered child minder to look after Little Ali while he works. When health visitor Carmel Jackson (Judith Jacob) notices that Little Ali is not being looked after properly, she investigates and finds that the child minder is neglecting the children in her care, leaving them alone all day. Unable to look after his son, Ali sends Little Ali to live with relatives.

Ali's financial problems continue and he leaves Walford in October 1989 when he loses his home and business. Little Ali now lives in Northern Cyprus with his father.

== Brian Wicks ==
Brian Wicks
- EastEnders character
- Portrayed by: Leslie Schofield
- Duration: 1988–1989
- First appearance: Episode 337; 28 April 1988
- Last appearance: Episode 445; 11 May 1989
In-universe information
- Occupation: Painter and decorator
- Brothers: John Wicks
- Wife: Pat Beale (until 1989)
- Sons: Simon Wicks
- Adoptive sons: David Wicks
- Grandsons: Steven Beale
- Nephews: Kevin Wicks
- Other relatives: Abi Branning

Brian Wicks, played by Leslie Schofield, is the second husband of Pat Wicks (Pam St Clement). He only appears twice on-screen, but the character's history is heavily intertwined with several other key characters within the series, and he is mentioned regularly for the first three to four years. The character is involved in one of EastEnders most complicated storylines: the paternity of Simon Wicks (Nick Berry).

Brian began an affair with Pat around 20 years earlier, while she was married to her first husband, Pete Beale (Peter Dean). During this time Pat became pregnant with her second son Simon, and claimed that Pete was the father. When Pat and Pete eventually divorced, Pat latched on to Brian. They married and Brian adopted Simon, and he and Pat's older child David Wicks (Michael French) both took on Brian's surname. They moved from Walford to Romford, after David was beaten up by Derek Branning (Terence Beesley), for getting his sister Carol (Lindsey Coulson) pregnant resulting in the birth of David and Carol's daughter, Bianca (Patsy Palmer).

Brian was mostly absent and used to beat Pat and her children, so she eventually left him after several years and returns to Walford. Pat causes havoc by revealing to Simon that Pete is not his father. Several other men are put in the frame, including Brian, Den Watts (Leslie Grantham), Frank Butcher (Mike Reid) and Pete's brother Kenny Beale (Michael Attwell). Furious rows erupt between all concerned, but Pat ominously refuses to divulge the father's true identity.

Brian first appears in April 1988. He has been informed that Pat has settled down with Frank Butcher, and is running The Queen Vic pub. Brian is interested in Pat's monetary affairs and their brief reunion is not pleasant. After calling Pat a slag and almost getting into a fight with Frank, Brian leaves. It isn't until a dying Lou Beale (Anna Wing) pressurises Pat in July 1988 to give Simon peace of mind regarding his paternity, that Pat finally reveals that Simon's biological father is Brian, the mentally unstable man Simon grew up assuming was his stepfather. Simon and Brian never appear on-screen together, although later plots imply that they do correspond with each other, despite Simon (who left Walford in December 1990) claiming regularly that he hates him and describing to Frank that growing up with Brian was like "living with a nutter".

Aside from this plot, Brian continues to remain a menacing off-screen presence, continuously pestering Pat for money. Brian isn't seen again until May 1989. Pat has decided that she wants to marry Frank, and to do this she needs to divorce Brian. She meets Brian and asks for the divorce, but he makes it clear that he will only divorce her if she gives him either £1000 or one of Frank's cars as pay-off. Pat has no choice but to get Brian the car. She deceives Frank by claiming that her aunt Mabel's car has been written off and asks if he can provide one for her. Frank agrees to get her the car free of charge. He manages to get hold of a mini, and Pat telephones Brian to tell him of her success. Although he is slightly annoyed that the car he is getting is only a mini, he nevertheless agrees to give Pat a divorce.

In 2006, Brian's nephew Kevin Wicks (Phil Daniels) and his stepchildren Deano (Matt Di Angelo) and Carly (Kellie Shirley) come to live with Pat.

== David Samuels ==
David Samuels
- EastEnders character
- Portrayed by: Christopher Reich
- Duration: 1988–1989
- First appearance: Episode 337; 28 April 1988
- Last appearance: Episode 479; 7 September 1989
In-universe information
- Occupation: Doctor
- Father: Maurice Samuels
- Mother: Hester Samuels
- Wife: Ruth Samuels (from 1989)
- Uncles: Dr. Harold Legg

Dr David Samuels is played by Christopher Reich. David first appears in April 1988 as Dr. Harold Legg's (Leonard Fenton) nephew who is visiting from Israel. David has fallen on hard times in Israel. He was being shunned by the locals because he had treated a wounded terrorist, who was guilty of bombing a bus that had killed his best friend. He had also split from his fiancée Ruth (Nitza Saul), and wanted a new start. When his mother Hester (Barbara Shelley) comes to visit Harold she asks him if it would be possible for David to join him in England for a while. Dr. Legg thinks it is a great idea, and David comes over the following month. On his arrival, he tends to Colin Russell (Michael Cashman) when he is attacked. David helps his uncle out with the practice and lives in the flat above the surgery.

Despite being extremely fond of each other, the new partners argue about almost everything. David wants to modernise the surgery and bring in computers, but Harold is set in his ways and is opposed to any obvious changes. Dr. Legg also disagrees with David's friendship with their secretary, Michelle Fowler (Susan Tully). Particularly when the two get drunk one night at a Christmas party, leave together and end up in the same bed. David awakes the next day not remembering a thing, but is reassured when Michelle informs him that he had been too drunk to do anything untoward anyway. Harold is not convinced however, and berates David for the degradation he'd brought upon himself and the surgery.

Later David and Dr. Legg fall out over Dr. Legg's treatment of patients. David is appalled that Dr. Legg has decided to lie to Colin and withhold vital information from him about his depleting health. He is also angry over Dr. Legg's lack of persistence concerning Donna Ludlow's (Matilda Ziegler) drug problem, and later blames himself for not providing sufficient help following her suicide in May 1989. Soon after David has stern words for Dr. Legg when he fails to diagnose Vicki Fowler with meningitis. Their altercation leads to Dr. Legg retiring and leaving the running of the surgery to David. However, David's contemporary methods alienate the older residents of Walford and after much protesting Dr. Legg eventually decides to rethink his retirement. David initially tries to fight this, but in August 1989, Ruth, arrives in Albert Square to reconcile with David, and she makes David and Harold realise how petty their arguing has become. The two doctors manage to patch up their differences, whilst David and Ruth put their past behind them and get back together. The following month they decide to marry and return to Israel together.

It is revealed in January 1990 that David and Ruth got married in Israel and Dr. Legg attended the wedding.

In 2019, David contacts Dot Branning (June Brown) from Israel to say that he cannot make it back to England for Dr. Legg's funeral.

== Matthew Jackson ==
Matthew Jackson
- EastEnders character
- Portrayed by: Steven Hartley
- Duration: 1988–1989
- First appearance: Episode 339; 5 May 1988
- Last appearance: Episode 466; 25 July 1989
In-universe information
- Occupation: Shop manager
- Mother: Lynne Jackson
- Wife: Carmel Roberts (1989–1990)

Matthew Jackson, played by Steven Hartley, is the manager of the local music store. He is first seen on screen in May 1988 as a new love interest for the social worker, Carmel Roberts (Judith Jacob). Matthew had had an unhappy childhood. His mother Lynne Jackson (Patricia Ford) had become pregnant at 16 and after bringing him up for 15 years, she had been forced to put him into custody. Matthew was fostered by another family and he had subsequently refused all contact with his mother and rather resented her for abandoning him.

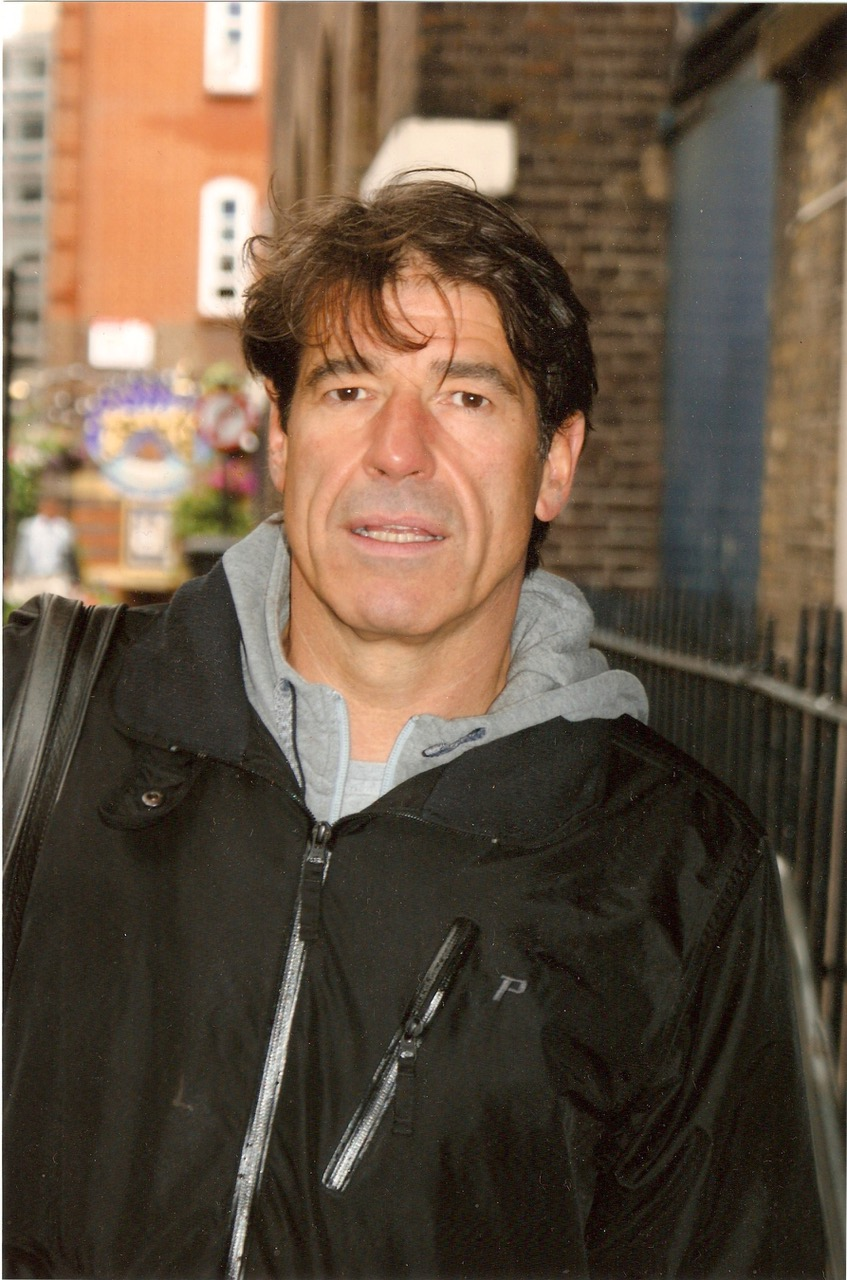
Actor Steven Hartley (pictured in 2009) was cast in the role of Matthew.

Matthew is initially a kind, easy-going man. Everyone loves him, except Carmel's brother, Darren (Gary McDonald), who objects to his sister dating him because he is white. His racial hatred eventually leads to Carmel kicking him out of her flat and Matthew later moves in instead. Darren subsequently flees Walford, leaving Carmel and Matthew to look after his two children, Junior (Aaron Carrington) and Aisha (Aisha Jacob).

Carmel is really besotted with Matthew, so when he proposes marriage in November that year, she gleefully accepts. Carmel wants to invite Lynne to the wedding, but Matthew is totally opposed to the idea. His ire rises at her mere mention, but Carmel pursues it, which causes Matthew to blow his top and viciously scream at her. Carmel is left dumbstruck at the sudden outburst, but this is only a small taster of what is to come in the following months.

The two marry in January 1989, but the day is ruined when Matthew sees his mother is in attendance. Carmel had got in contact with her, thinking that Matthew would be pleased to have her at the wedding. She is wrong and Matthew is furious. After shunning their reception party, he threatens to pack his things and leave. Carmel cannot understand his reaction and when she attempts to stop him leaving he grabs her by the throat, holds her up against a wall and berates her for her interference. Carmel is petrified, and upon seeing her fear Matthew immediately releases her and begins apologising profusely for his violent outburst. Carmel is shaken, but is convinced that his apology is sincere, so she drops the matter.

Things do not go much better for the newly weds in the following months. Matthew is finding it increasingly difficult to put up with Junior's presence in his life. The two regularly clash and this in turn causes major animosity between him and Carmel. This eventually evokes Matthew back into violence and he punches Carmel in the face one night during an argument about Junior. Carmel is left with a heavily bruised face, but yet again a tearful Matthew manages to convince her to forgive him. Matthew's behaviour continues to alternate from contrite and caring to hot-tempered and violent, for seemingly no reason. Nevertheless, Carmel remains with him as she believes she can help him combat and contain his rage. Despite his despicable behaviour, she still deeply loves him.

It isn't long before Junior had works out why his aunt is constantly covered in bruises. He tries to put a stop to it by informing various people about the abuse, which doesn't impress Matthew and this only makes his temper worse. Matthew begins to grow irrationally jealous over Carmel's friendship with Dr. David Samuels (Christopher Reich), and during a family meal one night, he begins to get violent towards her in front of Junior. In a desperate bid to protect his petrified aunt, Junior stabs Matthew with a kitchen knife. Matthew spends time in hospital, but once again he manages to convince Carmel that he has changed and she allows him to come home when he recovers. She tries to get Matthew to seek professional help, but Matthew is appalled by the idea, and true to form, he begins smashing up the house and threatening her with more violence. This is the last straw for Carmel and she wisely decides to end their relationship. She throws Matthew out and he leaves Walford in July 1989.

== Cindy Beale ==
Cindy Beale (also Williams) is played by Michelle Collins from 1988 to 1990 and from 1992 to 1998 and reprising her role in 2023. Cindy has an eye for the lotharios of Walford and despite trying to settle down repeatedly with the more reliable Ian Beale (Adam Woodyatt), she is unable to remain faithful to him. She has a selfish streak, and is often more concerned about her own needs than her family's. She often lies and schemes, particularly where men are concerned.

== Ricky Butcher ==
Ricky Butcher is played by Sid Owen. Introduced as a school boy in 1988, Ricky is one of the longest-running, male protagonists to feature in EastEnders. Owen originally left the role in 2000 to pursue a music career. However, he reprised the role in 2002 before being axed by producer Louise Berridge in 2004. In 2008, producer Diederick Santer reintroduced the character for a third time, along with his wife Bianca Jackson (Patsy Palmer). Ricky is portrayed as unintelligent, simplistic, easily led and bossed around by dominant personalities. On 26 February 2011, it was announced that Owen would take a temporary break from the show. The character exited on 19 July 2011, returning five months later on 13 December 2011. Ricky left EastEnders on 17 January 2012. Ricky made a brief return to EastEnders in June 2012, and returned again for a short stint between December 2022 and January 2023.

== Diane Butcher ==
Diane Butcher is played by Sophie Lawrence. Diane appears as a regular character between 1988 and 1991, when Lawrence decided to leave. The character makes several brief returns in 1993, 1994, and 1997. In 2008, Diane returns for the funeral of her father Frank (Mike Reid), and at the end of June 2012 for the wedding of her sister, Janine (Charlie Brooks).

Over the years, Diane develops from a rebellious teenager who runs away from home, to a free-spirited single mother having difficulty looking after her young son. In her most recent stint on EastEnders Diane is portrayed as a more mature character than previously seen, settled in France and, in a departure from a character previously depicted as heterosexual, she is stated to be in a long-term relationship with another woman.

== Gregory Mantel ==
Gregory Mantel
- EastEnders character
- Portrayed by: Pavel Douglas
- Duration: 1988–1989
- First appearance: Episode 351; 16 June 1988
- Last appearance: Episode 423; 23 February 1989
In-universe information
- Occupation: Gangster

Gregory Mantel is played by Pavel Douglas. Mantel is a well-spoken, sharp-suited gangster, an employee of The Firm.

He is introduced in June 1988, as a character claiming to be from "Walford Investments", who tries to persuade James Willmott-Brown (William Boyde) to let him buy into The Dagmar. When Willmott-Brown refuses, he soon finds that his suppliers are refusing to do business with him. The bar's business suffers dramatically as a result. The Firm financially ruin The Dagmar for the purpose of drawing in its custom for their own wine bar, Strokes, which is in fact a front for illegal gambling reluctantly run by Den Watts (Leslie Grantham). Den later uses his Firm connections to arrange for The Dagmar to be firebombed in retaliation to Willmott-Brown raping Kathy Beale (Gillian Taylforth), which angers Mantel and The Firm's bosses, the unseen Mr. Vinnicombe and Jack Dalton (Hywel Bennett). Mantel and Vinnicombe are good friends, and Mantel reports directly to him. Mantel later establishes the Portakabin office on Albert Square as a base of operations for "Walford Investments".

Mantel is also responsible for leading the operation to kill Den, after it is thought that he had grassed up The Firm for the Dagmar fire. Gregory is an intelligent man, and is able to work out the connection between Den and Michelle Fowler (Susan Tully), and that she might be the key to finding him. He orders that Michelle be tailed, and she was followed to the Walford canal. Mantel then co-ordinates the assassination via a walkie-talkie. Mantel gives the order to shoot Den, but 14 years later it is revealed that his attempt to kill Den was unsuccessful and he promptly returns to Walford in September 2003, and that the body found in the canal in May 1990 was that of Mr Vinnicombe, who had been killed on the orders of Jack Dalton after discovering that Den had survived.

== Joanne Francis ==
Joanne Francis is played by Pamela Salem. She first appears in Albert Square in June 1988 as a member of the gangster organisation known as The Firm, sent to Walford to manage Strokes Winebar, which is actually a facade for an illegal gambling den.

== Shireen Karim ==
Shireen Karim, played by Nisha Kapur, is the daughter of Ashraf and Sufia Karim (Aftab Sachak and Rani Singh). When she moves to Walford in 1988, she grows fond of Ricky (Sid Owen). They begin dating for a brief period, until Shireen's father finds out and forbids her from seeing Ricky. In 1989 Shireen in betrothed to Jabbar Ahmed (Gordon Warnecke), and although she is at first opposed to the idea of an arranged marriage, the pair soon fall in love. However the marriage is called off by the Ahmed family after they find out about Ashraf having an extra-marital affair. The women of the Karim and Ahmed families meet in secret, to discuss the possibility of Shireen and Jabbar marrying. Whether they reunite or not is not revealed, as the Karims leave Walford shortly after.

== Sohail Karim ==
Sohail Karim, played by Ronny Jhutti, is the son of Ashraf and Sufia Karim (Aftab Sachak and Rani Singh). He arrives in 1988 and takes a liking to Diane Butcher (Sophie Lawrence). Diane agrees to go on a date with him, but Sohail tries to molest her, and after the date ends abruptly. Sohail, along with the rest of his family, moves to Bristol in 1990.

== Benny Bloom ==
Benny Bloom
- EastEnders character
- Portrayed by: Arnold Yarrow
- Duration: 1988–1989
- First appearance: Episode 371; 25 August 1988
- Last appearance: Episode 413; 19 January 1989
In-universe information
- Occupation: Bricklayer
- Wife: Golda Bloom (widowed)
- Daughters: Margaret Stone

Benny Bloom is played by Arnold Yarrow.

Benny is a Jewish bricklayer who lived with his wife, Golda, at 5 Albert Square during World War II, later retiring to Clacton, where Golda died. Benny first appears visiting his old friend Dr Harold Legg (Leonard Fenton), and begins spending time with Ethel Skinner (Gretchen Franklin), who is also an old friend of his. As Benny and Ethel spend more time together, their friendship blossoms into a romance. A very drunk Benny later propositions Ethel, asking her to move in with him. Ethel initially thinks the offer is for a proposal of marriage, but when she realises that his motives are less than honourable, she is furious, and smashes his Issy Bonn records over his head. When relaying her concerns to her friend Dot Cotton (June Brown), Ethel confesses that she does love Benny, which angers Dot as she feels that Benny is an old pervert and she tells Ethel to stay well clear of him.

Ethel and Benny reconcile, and over lunch Benny decides to propose marriage to Ethel. However, Dot has heard that Benny plans to propose, and in a bid to prevent her best friend from accepting, she turns up at their luncheon and brands Ethel stupid for considering marriage, saying she could never be happy with a Jew, as they were "different". Ethel accuses Dot of anti-Semitism, and, just to spite Dot, she agrees to marry Benny. However, Ethel becomes unsure when Benny relays all the domestic duties he expects from her. The final straw comes when Benny informs Ethel that her pug Willy will not be able to stay at the manor where he lives, due to a "no pets" rule. Ethel cannot consider parting with her dog, so the engagement is called off.

This is Benny's last appearance on the Square, but a few months later the residents hear news that Benny has died, and left Ethel £2000 in his will.

== Mo Butcher ==
Mo Butcher is played by Edna Doré between 1988 and 1990. She is introduced as the matriarch figure of the Butcher family, Frank Butcher's (Mike Reid) elderly mother. She is portrayed as a battle-axe, tough and interfering. Her most notable storyline first aired in 1990, when the character is used to portray descent into Alzheimer's disease. Doré opted to leave the serial that same year; Mo was written out of the soap making her last appearance in November. Mo was killed off in 1992, but her death was not screened.

== Barnsey Barnes ==
Barnsey Barnes, played by John Hallam, is the initial cellmate of Den Watts (Leslie Grantham) at Dickens Hill prison, and he and Den soon became friends. When Den is branded a "grass", all the prisoners turned against him except Barnesy, who serves as his protector. When Barnsey leaves Dickens Hill to stand trial in January 1989, Den is deeply sorry to see him go. Den is shot in February 1989 and presumed dead. A body is wrongly identified as Den's the following year, and Barnes attends the funeral in May 1990.

== Queenie Price ==
Queenie Price, played by John Labanowski, is an inmate in Dickens Hill prison along with Den Watts (Leslie Grantham). It is revealed that Queenie is on The Firm's payroll, and The Firm believed that Den is trying to frame them. However, after The Firm discover Den is not the informant, Den discovers that it is Queenie. Den stuns Queenie with his discovery, but instead of turning him in to The Firm he uses him to provide information on them.

== Trevor Kellow ==
Trevor Kellow, played by Peter Doran, is an inmate at Dickens Hill prison. He has been imprisoned on remand for the mugging of an old lady, and though he claims to be innocent, the other prisoners take against him and bully him mercilessly. His solicitor instructs him to plead guilty to the crime to ensure a shorter sentence, but Trevor feels he cannot cope with imprisonment for a crime he didn't commit. His mental health swiftly deteriorates, and shortly after, he is found dead in his cell, having hanged himself on the morning of his trial.

== Victor Hampton ==
Victor Hampton, played by Michael Brogan, is an inmate at Dickens Hill prison. He is married to Gillie, but the marriage has come under strain due to Vic's continuous infidelities. He becomes severely depressed and is segregated from the other prisoners when he is tested and told that he is HIV positive. However Gillie is supportive, and promises to stay with him.

Victor is the first character in EastEnders to be diagnosed as HIV positive, paving the way for the controversial virus to feature in a storyline surrounding a much higher profile character – Mark Fowler (Todd Carty) – a couple of years later.

== Gillie Hampton ==
Gillie Hampton, played by Clare James, is married to prisoner Victor Hampton (Michael Brogan). Their marriage has come under strain due to Vic's adulteries. Gillie visits and asks him to get tested for any STDs he may have. Vic eventually does and it turns out he is HIV positive. Gillie (who tests negative for the virus) is supportive, and promises to stay with him no matter what.

== Guido Smith ==
Guido Smith
- EastEnders character
- Portrayed by: Nicholas Donovan
- Duration: 1988–1989
- First appearance: Episode 383; 6 October 1988
- Last appearance: Episode 426; 7 March 1989

Guido Smith, played by Nicholas Donovan, is first seen in October 1988 as a business contact of the graphic designer, Colin Russell (Michael Cashman). Over subsequent meetings, allegedly to discuss business, it becomes clear that Colin and Guido are attracted to each other. Eventually Colin plucks up the courage to make a pass at him, but has his hopes dashed when he discovers that Guido is already involved with another man named Des.

After seeking the advice of his friends in Walford, Colin decides to play things cool with Guido, by not actively chasing him and instead becoming the chased. The plan works and it isn't long before Guido has invited himself back to Colin's to spend the night. Soon after, Guido splits with his boyfriend and moves in with Colin. Colin has been scarred by past relationships, so he is adamant that he is not going to be used by Guido as a mere stop gap. He wants assurances that the relationship has a future and he begins to demand more commitment from Guido. Guido on the other hand, is far more relaxed and wants to take the relationship one stage at a time. Petty arguments erupt between the pair, instigated by Colin, whose demeanour is constantly changing from mild-mannered to belligerent, for no apparent reason. Guido is left bemused by this, but eventually Colin divulges that he is suffering from poor health and the worry is having a negative effect on his behaviour. Guido manages to persuade Colin to get a check up, after which it is revealed that he has been suffering from the early symptoms of multiple sclerosis.

The following weeks are tough for Guido, as he tries to help his boyfriend come to terms with his illness. Colin assumes that Guido will now want nothing more to do with him, but Guido assures him that he is there for the long haul. However, over the following months, major differences in the pair's political view points begin to surface. Colin's liberal opinions clash with Guido's more conservative ones. Colin is furious when Guido reports Junior Roberts (Aaron Carrington) to the police for stealing some of his CDs. He feels that police involvement will only worsen any anti-social behaviour, whilst Guido feels that punishment is the only way to curtail the problem. Meanwhile, Guido is becoming annoyed with Colin's tendency to worry more for others than himself, namely Donna Ludlow (Matilda Ziegler), the unappreciative heroin addict who Colin is trying to reform. Their opposing opinions bring to the fore how little they share in common. In addition, Colin cannot shake the feeling that Guido is only staying with him out of pity and so in February 1989 he decides to leave Walford to stay with his brother in Bristol. Colin decides not to tell Guido he is going, but a surprise visit from his ex, Barry Clark (Gary Hailes), stalls his departure, and Guido arrives home to see Colin packed and ready to leave. Guido is furious that Colin was planning on leaving without saying goodbye, but Colin says that he needs some space and he asks Guido to look after his flat while he sorts his head out. He then leaves a perplexed Guido to ponder on where he went wrong, and despite claiming that he will return, he never does.

After Colin's departure Guido leaves as well but rather mysteriously. Guido allows Donna to stay in his flat for one night, only to throw her out for overstaying her welcome. In the following episode his only appearance is when he encounters Donna outside Dot Cotton's front door, after Dot took Donna in. He last appears in the episode after this when he has an argument with Donna in the Vic. Guido storms out and is never seen again. Guido's exit scenes were filmed and planned to air. However, due to time constraints, the scenes were cut and his exit was never shown.

Writer Colin Brake has joked that when Ian (Adam Woodyatt) and Cindy (Michelle Collins) moved into the flat some time later, many viewers expected them to find Guido still inside.

Colin and Guido's gay relationship was the cause of much controversy in January 1989 when EastEnders aired the first homosexual mouth-to-mouth kiss on British television. The chaste peck on the lips between Colin and Guido resulted in a front page denunciation in The Sun newspaper, who described it as "a homosexual love scene between yuppie poofs [...] when millions of children were watching". The kiss was watched by twenty million people and came at a time when Margaret Thatcher's government had set forward a moral agenda that urged a return to traditional family values. The Sun printed the assertion that "Furious MPs last night demanded a ban on EastEnders as the BBC soap showed two men kissing full on the lips".

== Others ==
Character	Date(s)	Actor	Circumstances
Debbi Jansen	19 January	Shelley Thompson	Debbi is a Canadian counsellor Michelle Fowler (Susan Tully) sees when she wants an abortion. After Michelle becomes emotional when explaining her reasons for wanting an abortion, such as feeling sorry for her husband Lofty Holloway (Tom Watt), Debbi realises Michelle has made her mind up.
Clinic Receptionist	21 January	Ann Coombes	The clinic receptionist who handles Michelle Fowler's (Susan Tully) paperwork and payment at the abortion clinic.
Nurse	21 January	Janie Booth	The nurse who discusses anaesthetic options with Michelle Fowler (Susan Tully) for when she has an abortion and who looks after her after the procedure.
Catrina	21 January	Kerryann White	Catrina is a 16-year-old girl, who has an abortion on the same day as Michelle Fowler (Susan Tully).
Carol Sibley	28 January	June Page	Carol Sibley is a parent who doesn't agree with Michelle Fowler (Susan Tully) having an abortion. Michelle's aunt Kathy Beale (Gillian Taylforth) defends Michelle's decision, telling Mrs Sibley it's nobody else's business.
Judy	2 February– 19 April (8 episodes)	Joanna Bright	Judy briefly dates Barry Clark (Gary Hailes). Their relationship does not last as Barry is gay and is trying to appease his father in order to avoid being disowned.
Mrs Min Burrows	3 March– 26 May (3 episodes)	Carol MacReady	Mrs Burrows, alongside Angie Watts (Anita Dobson), was a patient at Walford General. Mrs Burrows annoyed Angie by constantly chatting to her about her long list of ailments, and bullying Angie into having a book from the library trolley. On a visit, Den Watts (Leslie Grantham) remarked that she should meet Dot Cotton (June Brown), and was not surprised to learn that Dot and Mrs Burrows were close friends. In May, Mrs Burrows showed up to visit Dot at work, and later drank with her and Dot's husband Charlie (Christopher Hancock) in The Queen Vic.
Harry Jameson	10 March– 26 May (3 episodes)	Anthony Dutton	An old business associate of Chris Smith (Allan O'Keefe) from Stockport, who provides Chris with money for his new haulage firm, Smith & Jameson Haulage.
Hester Samuels	29–31 March (2 episodes)	Barbara Shelley	Hester is the sister of Harold Legg (Leonard Fenton). Following the death of her husband, Maurice, Hester returns to Walford with Harold and informs him that her son David (Christopher Reich) in Israel is interested in joining Harold's practice in Walford. She also catches up with Lou Beale (Anna Wing) and reminisces about old times.
Ree	3 May	Uncredited	A friend of Angie Watts (Anita Dobson) from Spain. Angie frequently visits her and her partner Sonny. Angie's husband Den Watts (Leslie Grantham) telephones Ree and they meet in an undisclosed location. It is later revealed that Ree had confirmed Den's suspicions about Angie and Sonny having an affair.
Sonny	12–19 May (2 episodes)	Uncredited	A friend of Angie Watts (Anita Dobson) from Spain. Angie frequently visits him and his partner Ree. In 1988, Angie greets Sonny at the airport when he arrives. It becomes clear that the two have been having affair and have planned to move to Spain together. However, on the day of their departure, Angie's ex-husband Den Watts (Leslie Grantham reveals that he knew all along. Sonny and Angie then leave for Spain but within months break up and Angie moves to Florida.
Mrs Roberts	17 May	Cynthia Powell	The mother of Darren (Gary McDonald), Carmel (Judith Jacob) and Maxine Roberts (Ella Wilder). She arrives in Walford to visit Carmel looking for answers about Darren and they have a conversation. Following Carmel's engagement to Matthew Jackson (Steven Hartley), Mrs Roberts and her husband begin caring for their grandchildren Junior (Aaron Carrington) and Aisha (Aisha Jacob). In January 1989, Mrs Roberts couldn't attend Carmel and Matthew's wedding because her own mother had "a turn" on the day of the ceremony, and sent her prayer book with Maxine in lieu. Later that month, it became apparent that she and her husband could not cope with Junior and Aisha, and Maxine send them to live with Carmel. In August 1989, Mr Roberts dies and Carmel and the children leave Walford to help Mrs Roberts with her grief.
Richard	7 June–23 August (5 episodes)	Christopher Matthews	A friend of Colin Russell's (Michael Cashman) from Ealing, who visited him for a catch-up in The Dagmar. They went back to Colin's flat, where Richard admired Colin's work and listened as Colin opened up about his past relationship with Barry Clark (Gary Hailes). He told him of his recent ill health and sight problems, which Richard said were signs of stress and age; it later turns out they are signs of multiple sclerosis. He visits again in August, having heard about the firebomb attack on The Dagmar. A week later, he convinces Colin to take an overnight break, staying with Richard, his partner Tom and their new Doberman Pinscher puppy, Sophie.
Gerald Ludlow	7 June 1988– 18 April 1989 (2 episodes)	John Burgess	Gerald is Donna Ludlow's (Matilda Ziegler) adoptive father. He and his wife arrive in the Square when Donna's birth mother, Kathy Beale (Gillian Taylforth), contacts them. Gerald appeared to be more sympathetic to Donna than his wife, defending her lies as playfulness and claiming she had only started acting up once she discovered she was adopted. He and his wife were surprised to learn that Donna was a barmaid at The Queen Vic, and not living in a bedsit and working in a solicitor's office as she had told them; Gerald was particularly upset about it, and voiced his disapproval to Donna in a conversation after her shift in Ali Osman's (Nejdet Salih) café. Donna storms out of the conversation, and the Ludlows admit to each other that, although they don't approve of her lifestyle, they are comforted by the fact she is not taking drugs or living with a strange boy. When Donna dies in April 1989, he attends her funeral and thanks Dot Cotton (June Brown) for looking after her, revealing that he knew Donna was on drugs because she had stolen his chequebook and taken his money to fund her habit.
Mrs Ludlow	7 June 1988– 14 February 1989 (3 episodes)	Yvonne D'Alpra	Mrs Ludlow is Donna Ludlow's (Matilda Ziegler) adoptive mother. She and her husband arrive in the Square when Donna's birth mother, Kathy Beale (Gillian Taylforth), contacts them. Unlike her husband, Mrs Ludlow is aware that Donna tells frequent lies, telling Kathy that Donna once said in school that she was dying of an incurable disease; she agrees with Kathy that they must talk to Donna about her behaviour. She and her husband were surprised to learn that Donna was a barmaid at The Queen Vic, and not living in a bedsit and working in a solicitor's office as she had told them. In Ali Osman's (Nejdet Salih) café, Mrs Ludlow told Donna that they wanted her to return home, and that she had heard from Dot Cotton (June Brown) about the many lies Donna had told about her life. Donna storms out of the conversation, and the Ludlows admit to each other that, although they don't approve of her lifestyle, they are comforted by the fact she is not taking drugs or living with a strange boy. In February 1989, Rod Norman (Christopher McHallem) calls Mrs Ludlow and summons her to Walford, to try and break Donna from her heroin addiction; however, her arrival coincides with Donna telling the community that her adoptive parents had been killed in a car accident, and receiving a collection from patrons of The Queen Vic which she intends to use to fund her habit. Donna asks her for money, ostensibly for food, escapes from Colin Russell's (Michael Cashman) flat during their conversation, much to her dismay. She did not attend Donna's funeral in April 1989, as she was under sedation.
Mr Ballard	14 June	Peter Meakin	The area manager for Gladstone Breweries, who visits James Willmott-Brown (William Boyde) at The Dagmar for a conversation. He is critical of The Dagmar's theme nights, the fact that the clientele are not drinking enough alcohol, the defunct 5-a-side football team and the loss of Angie Watts (Anita Dobson) as manageress.
P.C. Willis	28 June–19 July (3 episodes)	John Blundell	A police colleague of DS West (Leonard Gregory). They question Pat Wicks (Pam St. Clement) and Frank Butcher (Mike Reid) about suspected money laundering at the Queen Victoria pub, where they have recently acquired the tenancy. Several weeks later, Willis is called to question Kathy Beale (Gillian Taylforth) following her rape at the hands of James Willmott-Brown (William Boyde). His questioning was hampered by Michelle Holloway's (Susan Tully) criticisms of his heavy-handed manner, despite Michelle's parents Pauline (Wendy Richard) and Arthur (Bill Treacher) telling her to quieten down. Willis later says to Arthur that he acts in such a way to help discern between genuine cases and adulterous housewives that are afraid of being caught out, before taking Kathy and Michelle to the police station for an examination. Willis is present when James is questioned by WPC Lyn Baxter (Eryl Maynard) in after being held overnight following his arrest.
Ingrid	7–12 July (2 episodes)	Caroline Redl	Ingrid is a Swedish au pair, who Simon Wicks (Nick Berry) invites to his birthday party. To try and put off the attentions of Mehmet (Haluk Bilginer) and Ali Osman (Nejdet Salih), she kisses him but he is quick to hide her from Cindy Williams (Michelle Collins) and Donna Ludlow (Matilda Ziegler). Simon gives Ian Beale (Adam Woodyatt) £10 and tells him to keep her company, and this works. However, shortly after Cindy and Donna leave, Ingrid and Ian leave to get a Kebab, much to Simon's irritation.
D.I. Gray	14 July–18 August (5 episodes)	Christopher Driscoll	Gray investigates Kathy Beale's (Gillian Taylforth) rape by James Willmott-Brown (William Boyde), and tells her to make full statement a statement and offers her the choice of submitting the statement to him or Lyn Baxter (Eryl Maynard). Several days later, Gray questions Arthur Fowler (Bill Treacher) about the arson attack on Willmott-Brown's Wine Bar, The Dagmar and also questions Willmott-Brown himself regarding the rape. He and Baxter then visit Kathy at home and talk to her again.
W.P.C. Lyn Baxter	14 July– 2 May 1989 (4 episodes)	Eryl Maynard	Baxter takes a statement from Kathy Beale (Gillian Taylforth) at Walford police station following Kathy being raped by James Willmott-Brown (William Boyde). She and DI Gray later interview Willmott-Brown. Baxter appears at the trial, where Willmott-Brown is found guilty.
Nigel Fenshaw	19 July– 29 September (2 episodes)	Tim Bannerman	Fenshaw is the solicitor representing James Willmott-Brown (William Boyde) when he is charged with raping his employee Kathy Beale (Gillian Taylforth). He also appears at the pre-trial hearing in September.
Flo	28 July	Uncredited	Flo is the arrogant aunt of Kenny Beale (Michael Attwell), Pauline Fowler (Wendy Richard) and Pete Beale (Peter Dean). She appears at her sister Lou Beale's (Anna Wing) funeral but is uncredited. However, Linda Robson portrayed a young Flo in the 1988 special episode "CivvyStreet", set in 1942 during the war. Upon Lou's death, she is the last surviving of Lou's siblings.
Christine	16 August – 6 September (8 episodes)	Cheryl Hall	The owner of a house in Manchester that Den Watts (Leslie Grantham) hides out in while on the run from Walford. While she was welcoming, encouraging Den to send her out for food and videos, Christine is annoyed at his restlessness, telling him that Mr Vinnicombe would rather Den did as he is told. Christine reveals that she got involved with The Firm through her time as a prostitute.
Eric "Chalkie" Whiting	8 September	Terry Molloy	An associate of Den Watts (Leslie Grantham) in Manchester, a former publican from Walford who seemed worried about Den dropping in on him. Chalkie is unwilling to help Den, but after being threatened with violence he reluctantly allowes Den to escape in his car; however, they are caught by Jerry (Aran Bell) and Mervyn (Christopher Whitehouse) sent to find Den by The Firm, who ripped a door off Chalkie's car. Pete Beale (Peter Dean) was also friends with him, and had his telephone number. After leaving Walford, Chalkie bought a pub in Moss Side.
Jerry	8 September	Aran Bell	Two heavies sent by The Firm to watch Den Watts (Leslie Grantham) in Manchester.
Mervyn	8 September	Christopher Whitehouse	Two heavies sent by The Firm to watch Den Watts (Leslie Grantham) in Manchester.
Ms. Martin	13 September 1988– 21 February 1989	Karen Archer	Main article: Dickens Hill § Ms. Martin A solicitor from The Firm, posted to monitor Den Watts' (Leslie Grantham) court case.
Potter	13 September	Harry Jones	A prisoner in the police station that tells Den Watts (Leslie Grantham) that Elliot Brownlow was not arrested for receiving stolen goods but for a nonce case.
Elliot Brownlow	13–15 September (2 episodes)	David Janes	A prisoner transferred to Dickens Hill alongside Den Watts (Leslie Grantham). He was arrested for hanging around outside a children's playground, although Brownlow tried to convince Den that he was arrested for receiving stolen goods; it wasn't long before Brownlow was exposed as a "nonce case", and Den treated him with contempt. On his first day in prison, Brownlow is assaulted in the toilets by fellow inmates, who defecate and urinate on him.
Jessie Williams	20 September	Uncredited	A friend of Ethel Skinner (Gretchen Franklin), who has her handbag stolen by a mugger as they shop in Walford Market on the way to visiting her daughter, which contained £3 and her pension book. Pete Beale (Peter Dean) gives chase, but doesn't get the bag back. A whip-round is held to replace the money, to which Dot Cotton donates 20p.
Sergeant Thomas	20 September	Leon Tanner	A policeman summoned by Sue Osman (Sandy Ratcliff) to oversee the first Neighbourhood Watch meeting.
Crown Barrister	29 September	Richard Cordey	The prosecuting official at the pre-trial hearing against James Willmott-Brown's (William Boyde) rape of Kathy Beale (Gillian Taylforth).
Spike Murphy	22 November 1988– 12 January 1989 (5 episodes)	Uncredited	Spike is a local drug dealer who supplies Donna Ludlow (Matilda Ziegler) with drugs. Brad Williams (Jonathan Stratt) roughs him up and warns him to stay off The Firm's patch. Spike reappears when Donna begs him for a fix. When Donna becomes desperately dependent on Heroin and has no money, she offers sex in exchange. Spike accepts but he invites a number of his friends much to Donna's horror. They attempt to gang-rape Donna but Rod Norman (Christopher McHallem)) is quick to foil the attack.
DI Bob Ashley	24 November 1988– 30 March 1989 (19 episodes)	Robin Lermitte	A police Detective Inspector who is determined to shut down The Firm. He arrests Den Watts (Leslie Grantham) for arson on The Dagmar. He also arrests James Willmott-Brown (William Boyde) when he tries to bribe Kathy Beale (Gillian Taylforth) into dropping her statement to the police about raping her. Ashley appears again questioning Junior Roberts (Aaron Carrington) about the racist graffiti found on Ashraf Karim's (Aftab Sachak) shop. Later he informs Sharon Watts (Letitia Dean) and Michelle Fowler (Susan Tully) that he and the police are 99% certain that Den is dead despite not yet being able to find his body in the canal. DI Ashley keeps Sharon up to speed with any progress in the investigation regarding Den.
