= Pete Beale =

Fictional character from Eastenders

- EastEnders character
- Portrayed by: Peter Dean
- Duration: 1985–1993
- First appearance: Episode 1 "Poor Old Reg"; 19 February 1985
- Last appearance: Episode 864; 13 May 1993
- Created by: Tony Holland
- Book appearances: Home Fires Burning; Swings and Roundabouts
- Crossover appearances: Bo Selecta (2004)
In-universe information
- Occupation: Market trader
- Family: Beale
- Father: Albert Beale
- Mother: Lou Beale
- Brothers: Harry Beale; Ronnie Beale; Kenny Beale
- Sisters: Pauline Fowler; Maggie Flaherty; Dora Beale; Norma Beale
- Wife: Pat Harris (backstory); Kathy Hills (until 1991)
- Sons: David Wicks; Ian Beale
- Stepsons: Simon Wicks
- Stepdaughters: Donna Ludlow
- Grandsons: Steven Beale (adoptive); Peter Beale; Bobby Beale; Joe Wicks
- Granddaughters: Bianca Jackson; Karen Wicks; Lucy Beale
- Nephews: Mark Fowler; Martin Fowler
- Nieces: Elizabeth Beale; Michelle Fowler
- Other relatives: Liam Butcher; Tiffany Butcher; Morgan Butcher; Whitney Dean (adoptive); Louie Beale; Jimmy Beale; AJ Branning (adoptive); Holly Wicks; Vicki Fowler; Mark Fowler Jnr

Pete Beale is a fictional character from the BBC soap opera EastEnders, played by Peter Dean. He makes his first appearance in the programme's first episode, on 19 February 1985. The character was introduced by Tony Holland, one of the creators of EastEnders; he was based on a member of Holland's family. Pete is featured in the soap for eight years as the local fruit and veg trader of Albert Square; he is a member of the original focal clan in the serial, the Beales and Fowlers. Pete is portrayed as a macho and somewhat insensitive individual who struggles to cope with emotion. Pete was axed from the soap in 1993 and departed in May that year after over eight years on-screen. The character was killed off-screen later that year, following Peter Dean's public criticism of the BBC.

== Creation and development ==
=== Background and casting ===
Pete Beale was one of the original twenty-three characters invented by the creators of EastEnders, Tony Holland and Julia Smith. Holland took the inspiration for some of the series' earliest characters from his own London family and background. Pete was based on one of his cousins, the twin brother to Pauline and son of Holland's aunt Lou; a family set-up that would eventually be recreated on-screen and would go on to be forever hailed as the first family of EastEnders, the Beales and Fowlers.

Pete's original character outline as written by Smith and Holland appeared in an abridged form in their book, EastEnders: The Inside Story: "Pete runs a fruit and veg stall in the market....married very young to Pat (Pam St Clement) - It turned out to be a total disaster. They were too young, rushing into a difficult life for all the wrong reasons, and truthfully, his wife was a vicious shrew ... he divorced his wife and married Kathy Beale (Gillian Taylforth) when he was 24 ... Ian (Adam Woodyatt) was born a year later. It took Kathy and Pete about ten years to woo [Pete's mother] Lou (Anna Wing) round to the idea of their marriage, and she can still sometimes be a bit cutting about it.... She doesn't believe in divorce ... He did have crazy dreams of making something of himself, he was going to be singer, a red-coat, run his own hotel ... On special occasions it's always Pete who's the life and soul of the party.... His two sons by his first marriage are nineteen and twenty and he hardly sees them.... If it wasn't for Thatcher, he'd consider voting Tory.... Never works on the anniversary of his dad's death, and with [his sister] Pauline (Wendy Richard), escorts his mum to the cemetery. He has a good relationship with Kathy, emotionally and sexually (Maybe he's a little concerned that she's keeping her good looks a bit longer than he is?).

Peter Dean was an actor known to Smith and Holland for his role in the crime drama Law and Order. Dean was from the East End of London and his family owned a stall in the market, just as the character he auditioned for did. Holland and Smith have said that despite the fact that Dean gave a disappointing reading at his audition, his tremendous enthusiasm for the part and for the show made up for it. He was subsequently offered the part. Adam Woodyatt, the actor playing Pete's son Ian, suggested in 2010 that Dean, along with Wendy Richard (Pauline Fowler), Susan Tully (Michelle Fowler) and Shirley Cheriton (Debbie Wilkins) were "the big names" of the original cast, all formerly known to the public; therefore, media interest in them was greater initially.

=== Characterisation ===
Pete Beale as he appeared in 1985.

Author Hilary Kingsley has described Pete as "rough and ready [...] Rough with his tongue and his fists, and ready to jump into an argument whether he knows anything about it or not. Act first, think later, if at all, is Pete's attitude." She implied that he was unintelligent suggesting that he would not get into Mensa and that he seems "thick as a brick". It has been suggested by writer Dorothy Hobson that the character of Pete was a portrayal of a typical East End male, "macho and mouthy". Author Christine Geraghty has suggested that Pete was seemingly intolerant of difference, but that his position was always undermined "by his blustering espousal of an excessively masculine position. Pete's [homophobic jokes for instance], like much else he does, are not followed through." Discussing the character's other qualities, author Kate Lock has suggested that Pete was "a simple, amiable sort of chap [who] left others to get on with the complicated things in life." Lock added that complications were beyond Pete's grasp and that he had trouble articulating emotions. Meanwhile, author Rupert Smith has classified Pete as a "soft touch" character. He added that Pete started off as "a cheery chappy" but became "hard to like", using his failure to support his wife Kathy through her rape ordeal in 1988 as a reason why he lost public sympathy.

David Buckingham, author of Public Secrets: EastEnders and its Audience, has discussed the writers use of Pete, specifically to show masculinity in an innovative way - as a problem. He suggested that with Pete, the programme questioned the traditional definition of masculinity: "Pete clearly regards himself as a 'real man' and as 'the boss' of his family [...] He also feels he is an expert on women [but] on the other hand, however, Pete's masculine self-image has been repeatedly undermined. The arrival of his ex-wife Pat Wicks [in 1986], for example, provided a view of Pete which had not hitherto been heard in the serial: she told Pauline that Pete was 'boring, selfish and terrible in bed', and went on to torment him by revealing that he was not in fact the father of his son Simon - 'you're not man enough to make Simon'." Buckingham also suggests that Pete was also publicly humiliated on a number of occasions, with the most "remarkable example" being shown in 1987, after he was victim to a practical joke and attended an alleged cross-dressing party at The Queen Victoria public house as the only person in full drag. The episode ended with a close-up of Pete's "tear-stained, luridly made-up face". Buckingham suggested that Pete's definition of his own masculinity regularly came into question in the serial, and the connection between masculinity and violence - shown occasionally with Pete - "far from being celebrated, has been seen as a problem".

Pete's catchphrase was "Alright treacle?" pronounced "awight treacle", often used when addressing female characters. Peter Dean has discussed why the catchphrase came into existence: "I had this saying - treacle. There was this long scene with Den and his mistress and I had to ask her for a drink, but I completely forgot her name, so said 'Give us a drink, treacle'. And after the episode came out, the actress said her children kept calling her treacle! A couple of scriptwriters wanted to stop it - they didn't want any catchphrases. But one lovely writer put it in so I could say it was in the script! And it stuck. Poor people couldn't afford sugar so put treacle in their tea. And it just means someone sweet and nice. I always said it and my granddad said it. Even now people come up to me and ask if I'll say 'Awight treacle' down their mobile phone to someone."

A prop regularly used by Pete was a metallic pewter tankard; Pete had his own tankard kept at the soap's public house, which Pete allegedly drank beer from. However, Peter Dean, who is a Buddhist in real life, would only drink lemonade in pub scenes; and therefore the tankard had to be used to disguise the fact that he was not really supping beer.

=== Development ===
Pete Beale was initially scheduled to be a short-term character. It had been decided way in advance that the big New Year cliffhanger of 1986 would be the killing-off of a character and the chosen person had to have the greatest effect on the remaining characters. Pete Beale was the obvious choice as his death would leave Kathy a widow and Ian (his son) would have to take over as head of the house. Lou was his mother, Pauline his sister and Den Watts his best friend, and everyone knew him from the fruit and veg stall, so storylines were planned in which Pete would have a heart-attack; a shock tactic to revive interest in the show after the excitement of Christmas. At the last minute, Julia Smith got "cold feet" and decided that Pete was too useful a character to lose so early in the programme's history; like Pauline he was considered a linchpin character. A new shock storyline was needed and so it was decided to introduce Den's mistress Jan Hammond into the show instead.

One of the most notable storylines featuring Pete revolved around the paternity of his alleged son, Simon Wicks (Nick Berry). Pete was shell-shocked to discover that Simon, was not really his child, and that he was possibly the son of his brother Kenny (Michael Attwell). The storyline spanned several years, since the arrival of Pete's first wife Pat (Pam St Clement) in 1986, until the long-awaited showdown between Pete, Pat and Kenny in February 1988. The episode written by Tony McHale contained shocking revelations that would affect several relationships on the Square for years to come. In the on-screen events, Simon was shown to bond with Kenny, despite Pat admitting that she did not know which of the Beale brothers had fathered Wicksy. A final plot twist mid-1988 saw Pat finally reveal what she thought was the truth, that Simon's real father was Brian Wicks (Leslie Schofield), Pat's second husband and Wicksy's adoptive father. Despite this revelation on-screen, writer Colin Brake stated in an official EastEnders' book in 1994 that the true parentage of Simon was still uncertain in the minds of the producers. He stated, "At various times over the years the story has been amended, until the only certainty is that we will never be certain about the actual facts." He added that, at the time of writing the book for EastEnders' 10th anniversary in 1994, "the current producers believe that Pete was the father of [Simon's older brother] David and may have been the father of Simon."

The character of Pete lasted in the show for eight years, and was eventually written out in 1993 when the writers felt that the character had come to a natural end. There was initially talk of Pete getting back together with his ex-wife Kathy, but it was felt that it would have been a retrogressive step, and it was dismissed. The character was killed in an off-screen car crash in December 1993 and brought back to Walford to be buried. The press reported at the time that Pete was killed off because he spoke negatively about EastEnders in the press following his axing. There was also speculation that he had not got along with Gillian Taylforth, who played his ex-wife Kathy. Dean commented, "When they wrote me out of EastEnders, they said they had run out of storylines. I was a naughty boy and said if the wheel falls off the cart, get rid of the cart. But they got rid of me, not the scriptwriters [...] What gets me is the way it was done. It's all politics and backstabbing."

== Storylines ==
=== Backstory ===
Pete and his twin sister, Pauline Fowler (Wendy Richard), were born to Albert (Gary Olsen) and Lou Beale (Anna Wing). They were born and raised in number 45 Albert Square. Albert owned a fruit and veg stall on Walford market. Pete used to help out on the stall as a boy, and when Albert died, Pete inherited the stall.

Pete schooled with his neighbour and friend, Den Watts (Leslie Grantham); they remained close in adulthood. In his mid-teens, Pete had a one-night stand with prostitute Pat Harris (Pam St Clement) who informed Pete she was pregnant. Pete did the chivalrous thing and married Pat in 1961 when he was 16; however it transpired that the pregnancy was a false alarm and Lou always felt that it was a ploy to trap her son. During the marriage, Pat gave birth to two sons, David (Michael French) and Simon (Nick Berry), the latter of whom Pete believed to be his. Yet Pat could not settle down. She had various affairs, including a tryst with her former lover Frank Butcher (Mike Reid), a one-night stand with Den, and an affair with Pete's older brother Kenny (Michael Attwell). Lou found Pat and Kenny in bed together and banished Kenny abroad, but Pete was unaware of the affair. Pat was also having an affair with another man named Brian Wicks (Leslie Schofield). When Pete found out he left Pat - she was six months pregnant with Simon at the time - and then went into a relationship with local girl, Kathy Hills (Gillian Taylforth). There was a messy divorce and soon after, Pat married Brian in 1966 and he took on responsibility of her two sons. Pete had little contact with his children following this.

Three years after leaving Pat, Pete married Kathy in 1968, although there was strong opposition from Lou, who would not condone her son's divorce. A year later they had their only son Ian (Adam Woodyatt). The family did reasonably well financially and enjoyed a more luxurious lifestyle than Pete's extended family.

=== 1985–1993 ===
Pete enjoys a simple life, but his old-fashioned views about masculinity cause rifts between him and Ian. Pete is thrilled when his other son Simon appears in Walford, which excludes Ian further. Pete grows attached to Simon, but Pat's disclosure in 1986 that Pete is not Simon's father threatens to ruin their relationship. Lou attempts to persuade Pete that Pat is lying, all the while believing that she is actually telling the truth and that Kenny is Simon's father. When Pauline discovers this, she informs Pete, leading to numerous confrontations between him and Pat. When Pat is assaulted in 1987, Pete becomes prime suspect and is interrogated. It is not until the real attacker tries to assault Debbie Wilkins (Shirley Cheriton) that Pete's name is cleared.

When Kenny returns to Walford in 1988, the brothers fight about Simon's paternity until Pat suggests that neither of them are Simon's dad. Pat enjoys the upset she has caused for the Beales, and it is not until a dying Lou pleads with her to finally name the father that Pat succumbs and tells Simon that his father is Brian Wicks, whom she had been having an affair with during her marriage to Pete.

Marital problems arise in 1988 when Kathy gets a job as a barmaid at "The Dagmar" winebar, working for James Willmott-Brown (William Boyde). Pete grows jealous of Kathy and James's working relationship. Kathy ignores his protests and confides in James about Pete after work one night; however, James gets the wrong idea, attempts to seduce Kathy and, when she turns him down, rapes her. Pete struggles to come to terms with this and begins entertaining the idea that the sex was consensual and not rape. Kathy grows depressed and isolates herself from Pete, who begins drinking heavily. Following various drunken binges, Kathy finally makes the decision to leave him. Later she is courted by Laurie Bates (Gary Powell), another fruit and veg stall owner who opens in direct competition to Pete; Pete and Laurie are regularly at loggerheads. Pete tries to retaliate towards Kathy's new relationship by producing his own love interest in the shape of Barbara (Alannah O'Sullivan), a woman he meets in New Zealand. It is a bluff however, as Pete still wants Kathy back but she makes it abundantly clear that she has moved on.

When the market's future is threatened by a possible development, Pete and the other traders campaign to save it. Pete refuses when a corrupt man from the council, Stuart Kendle (Mark Sprotson), tries to bribe him into dropping his opposition to the new development and his stall is demolished by a JCB in response. Newcomers Grant (Ross Kemp) and Phil Mitchell (Steve McFadden) are impressed by Pete's bravery; they break into the council's offices and steal evidence proving Kendle is corrupt. When this information is given to the Borough Surveyor, the development plans are dropped and the market is saved.

1992 sees the reappearance of James Willmott-Brown, released from prison. He hopes to rebuild his life on the Square, but Pete rounds together a mob who take James to a high-rise flat building, where Pete threatens to throw him off the top unless he signs a paper stating he will never return to Walford. Willmott-Brown takes out an injunction on Pete and moves back to Walford regardless and harasses Kathy. Eventually Kathy and Pete confront James and persuade him to leave Walford. At the same time, Kathy finally convinces Pete — that their marriage is over.

Following a long period of loneliness, Pete gains a new love interest in 1993, when a chance meeting reunites him with an old school friend of his sister's, Rose Chapman (Petra Markham). Their romance continues despite Rose revealing she is married to Alfie Chapman, who has a reputation for extreme violence. She is unable to stay away from Pete even when she discovers her husband has a terminal illness and she is beaten by Alfie's violent family as a result. In order to be with Rose, Pete decides they have to leave the area. He and Rose depart in May 1993 and go into hiding.

Pauline is distraught by her brother's sudden disappearance and, when she hears that Alfie Chapman has died in prison, she advertises for Pete's return. Pete replies and the residents of Albert Square plan a party to celebrate his comeback. However, on the day he is due back, the police inform Pauline that Pete and Rose have died in a car accident in Leicester. It is later revealed that the Chapman family are responsible for their deaths. Pete's twin grandchildren are born the same day as his death; a girl called Lucy Beale and a boy, Peter Beale, who Ian names in honour of his father. His body is returned to Walford and buried.

== Reception ==
Despite lasting in the serial for eight years, during his tenure in EastEnders, producers appeared to differ in their opinions of Pete's importance in the programme; some referenced the character's value, while others deemed him disposable and there were several attempts to cull the character. It was revealed in 1987 that Pete was originally only intended to be a short-term character. Show creator and series producer Julia Smith had considered killing him off in 1986, but she vetoed this idea, ultimately deciding that Pete was too much of an asset to lose. When producer Mike Gibbon took the helm as head of the serial in 1989, he employed writer David Yallop to pen storylines that controversially killed off various characters in the show. According to Yallop, the decision to axe the characters was dependent of the talent of the actors portraying them. Yallop stated that Pete Beale was among the characters to be killed. The storyline never came to fruition because Gibbon's controversial plots were not sanctioned by the BBC and Yallop's storylines were not used; Yallop sued the BBC for termination of contract, at which time the finer details of the proposed plots were disclosed to the media. Despite this, in 1991, EastEnders' storyline editor Andrew Holden described Pete as "almost synonymous" with the programme because he had been there since day one. He added, "[Characters like Pete] carry a lot of history. Original characters are very precious things. [Pete] has always seen himself as a family man and in the future we see him making a determined effort to put his family back together. Whatever happens he'll always carry a torch for Kathy". According to Holden at that time, Pete was "an untouchable", not in danger of being killed off.

However, this opinion apparently altered by 1993, when script-writers decided that Pete's storyline had come to a "natural end" and he was written out. Peter Dean went public with his criticism of the show, believing there was a lot more his character had to offer and that the failure to come up with decent material for Pete was due to unimaginative scriptwriters. His exposé to The Sun newspaper included his suspicions of set secrets, such as earlier plans to write Pete out and his opinions about former co-stars. Following Dean's exposé, Pete was killed off-screen seven months after his initial exit. Peter Dean speculated that Pete's off-screen killing was a result of the exposé. Although this accusation has never been confirmed by the BBC, show creator Julia Smith had publicly decreed that derogatory stories sold by cast members to the press about the show's production would not be tolerated, and any cast member doing so would not return to the show.

Discussing Pete's demise, Gillian Taylforth who played his ex-wife Kathy Beale, has stated that although she and actor Peter Dean had problems "now and then", she found it really hard when he left, and that Pete's death was "an end of an era for EastEnders." The tankard that Pete was often seen drinking from in pub scenes was allegedly so popular that Peter Dean reported it was stolen twice by fans and he had to replace it on both occasions.

In 2020, Sara Wallis and Ian Hyland from The Daily Mirror placed Pete 54th on their ranked list of the best EastEnders characters of all time, calling him "a charmer in a sheepskin coat".
