= Angie Watts =

Fictional character from EastEnders

- EastEnders character
- Portrayed by: Anita Dobson
- Duration: 1985–1988, 2025
- First appearance: Episode 1 "Poor Old Reg"; 19 February 1985
- Last appearance: Episode 7069; 19 February 2025
- Created by: Tony Holland and Julia Smith
- Introduced by: Julia Smith (1985); Chris Clenshaw (2025)
- Book appearances: Swings and Roundabouts; Blind Spots
In-universe information
- Other names: Angie Shaw
- Occupation: Pub landlady Barmaid
- Family: Watts
- Husband: Den Watts (until 1987)
- Adoptive daughters: Sharon Watts
- Grandsons: Dennis Rickman Jnr (adoptive); Albie Watts (adoptive)

Angie Watts is a fictional character from the BBC soap opera EastEnders, played by Anita Dobson from the first episode of the series in 1985 until 1988, when Dobson decided to leave, and the character was written out.

Angie is well known for her cheeky banter, her perm and turning to alcohol during her stormy marriage to cheating Den Watts (Leslie Grantham), which ended when he handed her divorce papers on Christmas Day 1986, in an episode watched by a record-breaking 30.1 million viewers.

Despite being the loud and feisty lady of Walford, and having a close relationship with her beloved adopted daughter Sharon Watts (Letitia Dean), she does not have much real happiness during her time in Albert Square. Alcoholism claimed her life in April 2002 when she died off-screen from cirrhosis of the liver, 14 years after her last appearance prior to that date. Angie made an unannounced appearance as an apparition on 19 February 2025 during the show's 40th anniversary, reprising the role for the first time in 37 years.

== Creation ==
=== Background ===
Angie Watts was one of the original twenty-three characters invented by the creators of EastEnders, Tony Holland and Julia Smith. The character of Angie was originally going to be named Pearl and she, her husband and adopted daughter were to be the occupants of the soap's local pub, now famously known as The Queen Vic. Holland, who had worked as a barman in his youth, called upon his own personal experiences to invent the Watts family and the pub they lived in. Holland and Smith had always been critical of the way pubs had been portrayed on television feeling they lacked vitality and life, so they were determined that their pub and occupants were going to be more 'real'. The Watts were seen by Holland as integral to the shows success, partly because he had already guessed that the pub was going to be a monstrous battleground where emotions would run high on a regular basis, and also because the occupants would be providing the majority of the drama.

Angie's original character outline as written by Smith and Holland appeared in an abridged form in their book, EastEnders: The Inside Story. In this passage, Angie will be referred to as Pearl, her husband as Jack, her daughter as Tracey and her dog as Prince (known now as Den, Sharon and Roly respectively).

"Jack and Pearl are not criminals. They're not angels either. Villains perhaps? Well, he certainly is. They've been married for fifteen years, and haven't had sex with each other for thirteen of them. The marriage is a front for the sake of the pub's image. The daughter, Tracey is adopted – maybe for the same reason. They have a dog too – Prince – an Alsatian...Pearl met Jack at school, and they were sweethearts from the word go. Money and things are what interest her. Jack didn't give her these fast enough in the early stages of their marriage, which is partly why it turned sour. It also went wrong because of sex: he just didn't turn her on...or didn't turn her on enough. And she never stops reminding him of how much of a man he isn't. She is basically a scrubber, trying to reform herself. "Nobody turns me on like Jack" she says loudly in public, "I can't make it with another man." But she does, often...Class is what Pearl wants, and something she'll never pull off. Yes, she's attractive. She's also flash...Pearly the worker is no fool. She can keep two sets of books with the best of them, hire with skill and fire without mercy. Sexual innuendo is the key to her character. The wink. The tease..."Have you seen the Honda 750? Take me for a ride any time!"...Her pub is spotless. And the customer's always right. Except when he isn't. Then she can be so polite, he'll wish he'd gone to a wine-bar...Sometimes Pearl gets so legless that Jack has to throw her over his shoulder and fireman's lift her upstairs to their flat, where they have separate bedrooms...She's fun, she tries and she's trapped. She's also larger than life." (page 63)

=== Casting ===
The actress Jean Fennell was recommended for the part by the director Matthew Robinson. Fennell was born in the East End of London and both Holland and Smith considered her to have unique qualities to her personality, which combined "vitality and vulnerability, and an almost desperate nervous energy" – all of which were perfect for Angie. Fennell was given the role, however during rehearsals Holland and Smith began to realise that Fennell was wrong for the part, and Smith made the decision to re-cast the role of Angie. With only four days to the first studio recording of EastEnders, Smith set about finding a suitable actress. Smith had taught the actress Anita Dobson many years earlier and remembered her as "sharp, brittle, very theatrical, with a vitality that was almost intense and a range of emotions that were alarming considering her youth", but was worried she was too young for the part. However, when Dobson was brought in for an audition it was noted she was "exactly the right age" after all. Following a very successful reading Dobson was cast as Angie.

== Character development ==
The Watts were the surprise hit characters of the show. Angie and Den were a live-wire couple whose on/off relationship made the Queen Vic pub exciting and unpredictable and millions of viewers tuned in to watch the destruction of their relationship on-screen. Den's clashes with Angie brought EastEnders to a peak of popularity and toppled rival soap Coronation Street from the top of the ratings chart. Angie and Den were used to advertise the show abroad in countries such as America.

=== Den and Angie mania ===
During 1986, the series became dominated by Angie and Den's storylines, and the focus of the programme was very much concentrated on their combustible relationship. The emphasis began early in 1986 with the arrival of Den's mistress Jan Hammond. Jan had been a powerful off-screen presence for the first year. Her menacing voice at the end of the telephone severely affected the mood of both Den and Angie and kept the audience on edge every time the phone rang. Jan's physical arrival at the Vic in January 1986 was one of the show's dramatic highlights. Her invasion of Angie's territory was a springboard to future emotional fireworks and a precursor to Angie's further dependence on alcohol and her attempted suicide.

Dobson had been opposed to the suicide storyline from the beginning; she fought hard to get the scripts changed, but she was eventually persuaded to play the scenes, and was applauded for a "brilliant performance". However, Angie's suicide attempt provoked a massive reaction, not all of it being favourable. There was a public outcry about the last two shots of the suicide episode, and Julia Smith subsequently had to cut one of them for the omnibus edition. Some accused the programme of sensationalising suicide and giving ideas to copy-cats. The buildup to Angie's desperate action and its aftermath were intended to demonstrate the full despair of her situation. Holland and Smith have maintained that the horror of its on-screen depiction was meant to deter, not encourage, the act.

Den and Angie's traumatic two-hander episode in October 1986 was a risky experiment. A thirty-minute episode with only two people in it had never been attempted in a soap before. Holland and Smith feared that the episode would not hold up, however press and audience alike were in agreement that it did. Once it was done, it set a precedent, and the programme has featured two-handers ever since. The episode was structured like a "tennis match" between Angie and Den, with a non-speaking window-cleaner forever strolling innocently into the action. It began with Den trying to tell Angie that he wanted a divorce, but not before Angie tries in vain to continue with life as normal; within the opening moments of the episode she switches on the washing machine and throughout the "tennis match" the audience hears the cycle progress almost as a soundtrack. The thundering spin cycle often playing alongside Angie or Den screaming and shouting and the gentle wash action playing alongside the more tender moments. Angie was shocked, and for a moment defeated, but she then dropped her bombshell, and told Den that she only had six months to live. At first, Den did not believe her, but eventually Angie's hysterical performance convinced him. He crumbled and promised to stay with her, and only after he left did Angie smile in triumph, letting the audience in on her secret that it was all a big lie. Written by Jane Hollowood and directed by Antonia Bird, this episode is considered to be one of the finest episodes in EastEnders catalogue.

The Den/Angie/Jan triangle was to continue for many months. The climax was a trip to Venice when Angie, convinced that Den had finished with his mistress, was taken there for a second-honeymoon, returning to London on the Orient Express. This gave the writers and producers an opportunity to open the show up from the confines of Albert Square. However the trip to Venice was fraught with problems and Dobson, Leslie Grantham (Den) and Jane How (Jan) were hounded by the press at all times. Their photographs appeared in British newspapers, thus ruining the shock surprise that Tony Holland had created, by including Den's mistress in the episode. Despite huge efforts from all involved, the Venice episodes were only moderately successful, although the revelations discovered by Den in the episode set the scene for one of EastEnders most renowned episodes, which aired on Christmas Day that year. After over-hearing his wife confess that her illness was fabricated, Den filed for divorce. 30.1 million viewers tuned in on Christmas Day in 1986 to witness Den handing Angie her divorce papers, giving the soap its highest ever episode rating, which has yet to be beaten by any other plotline from any other soap in the UK.

30.1 million viewers watched Den serve Angie divorce papers (Christmas 1986).

This storyline saw the separation of Den and Angie. Holland and Smith had anticipated that Den and Angie would be popular, but they had not guessed how hysterical the reaction to them would be. It was decided that Den and Angie would have to be played down for a while so that other characters would have the opportunity to shine through. The next few years saw Den and Angie struggle to get by without each other, and eventually they reunited as business partners.

=== Departure and legacy ===
In 1988, Anita Dobson decided that she wanted to move on after three years playing Angie, and she left in May 1988. Despite many alleged attempts at getting Dobson to reprise the role, she never accepted, commenting: "Why tarnish the gorgeous creation that was Angie Watts?". The character of Angie Watts was subsequently killed off-screen in 2002 (dying of a drink related illness) and brought home to be buried by her on-screen daughter Sharon in order to facilitate the return of the actress Letitia Dean. In 2010, Dobson said she was glad her character was killed off, as it was unrealistic that the character would ever return. Despite this, Dobson did return to the role 37 years later during the show's 40th anniversary episodes in February 2025, appearing as an hallucination by Sharon on the staircase of the Vic.

In February 2011, Dobson said that she had no regrets being in EastEnders, as it propelled her to fame, and said she believed that people were drawn to Angie because she is a survivor and funny, qualities that drew Dobson herself to Angie. She said "[Angie] could be on the floor, drunk, weeping buckets, mascara everywhere, then drag herself up the next morning in that old blue dressing gown, tidy herself up and be in the bar that night telling jokes and looking a million dollars."

Kellie Bright has said that she has based her portrayal of Linda Carter on Angie.

== Storylines ==
Alcoholic Angie shares a stormy marriage with her womanising husband, Den Watts (Leslie Grantham), and refuses to let him go even during their rockiest times. They run and live in The Queen Victoria public house on Albert Square. Angie and Den doted on their teenage adopted daughter, Sharon (Letitia Dean) – who carries on loving them despite her resentment of Den's affairs and Angie's binge drinking. Angie is good at putting on a front for the customers, dressing to kill, screeching outrageously with the girls, but inside she is crippled with depression. Despite all her bravado, all she really wants is a happy marriage with Den, even though he treats her terribly and has endless affairs with other women.

During 1985, Den and Angie celebrate their 17th wedding anniversary but it soon becomes clear that their marriage is a sham. Behind the scenes of their great business partnership, there is not much of a relationship. Den has a posh mistress Jan Hammond (Jane How), a fact that Angie is all too aware of. Early in the year, Den even manages to get on holiday to Spain with Jan, telling Angie that he is checking out a possible time-share holiday home purchase. With Den gone, Angie does what she always does in times of trouble, and turns to alcohol to drown her sorrows. She also sets about trying to seduce the men of Walford in a bid to get back at her philandering husband. Lofty Holloway (Tom Watt), Simon Wicks (Nick Berry) and even Arthur Fowler (Bill Treacher) are all subject to Angie's not-so-subtle flirting, but her only successful conquest is local builder, Tony Carpenter (Oscar James). Tony falls for Angie, but she is only using him to get back at Den. The affair is conducted in secret, but they are caught in a passionate clinch in the middle of The Queen Vic by Sharon. Angie has to bribe Sharon to ensure her silence, and even informs her about Den's infidelity. Sharon is disgusted that both her parents are guilty of adultery. Upon Den's return from his holiday with Jan, Angie calls off the affair with Tony, but it is not long before Sharon gives Den the impression that Angie has been unfaithful. Den confronts Angie, and she admits to her and Tony's affair, but unfortunately for her, Den is not concerned about her infidelity, more about his reputation, which upsets Angie even more.

Although Angie tries to stop drinking, her attempts always fail dismally and by the end of the year, she is arrested for drink-driving when she crashes Den's car on the way home from a darts match. In 1986, Den's mistress, Jan, starts to frequently visit The Queen Vic. The physical arrival of Jan sends Den and Angie's marriage into further decline as she is unable to contain her jealousy and anger. Angie becomes so depressed that she takes a near lethal cocktail of alcohol and pills in an attempted suicide. By chance, Den returns home early following an argument with Jan, discovers Angie and rushes her to the hospital where she has her stomach pumped. Angie recovers, but is left shaken when she discovers how close to death she actually came. Upon recovering, Angie decides to play Den at his own game and so she begins another affair, this time with Andy O'Brien (Ross Davidson). Den is furious when he discovers them in bed together, but his rage is short-lived as he has more pressing matters on his mind, such as the birth of his illegitimate daughter, Vicki Fowler (Emma Herry), following an affair with Sharon's best friend, Michelle Fowler (Susan Tully). Angie's affair with Andy only lasts a month, ending when Andy reunites with his ex-girlfriend Debbie Wilkins (Shirley Cheriton). Andy dies after being struck by a lorry shortly afterwards.

As the year moves on, Den decides that he wants to leave Angie so he can marry Jan. He finally gets round to telling Angie his intentions in October, after which Angie becomes distraught. Desperate to hold on to her husband, she announces that she is terminally ill and only has six months to live. Upon hearing this, Den becomes wracked with guilt, and so decides to revise his plans and stay with Angie. He sets about organising a second honeymoon for them in Venice. However, their holiday is ruined when Jan arrives, and upon seeing her and Den together, Angie starts drinking again, having not long given up. On the way home from Venice on the Orient Express, a drunk Angie tells the barman all about her big lie. Unfortunately for Angie, Den overhears every word, and from that moment on he reverts to his original plan to leave her, although he decides to wait a while before letting Angie know that he knows about her lie. On Christmas Day 1986, Den decides to get his revenge. Thinking that her marriage is safe, Angie is happier than ever – until Den informs her that he overheard her conversation with the barman, and he then serves her divorce papers as a Christmas present. This episode had the highest number of viewers the show has ever seen – with more than 30 million viewers (more than half of the British population) tuning in to see it. In response, Angie and Sharon pack their bags and walk out of the pub, choosing to take the route through the public area to cause Den the most embarrassment possible.

Angie and Den have dinner together on the Orient Express (1986).

In 1987, Angie secures herself a job as the manager of The Queen Vic's rival drinking establishment, The Dagmar. Owner, James Willmott-Brown (William Boyde), is only too happy to have Angie's expertise on board for his new, suave wine bar. Angie and Den continue to row constantly and in a bid for revenge, Angie vows to take Den "to the cleaners" for her divorce settlement. In retaliation, Den installs Jan as the new landlady of The Queen Vic, which only infuriates Angie even more. However, Den and Jan's cohabitation eventually leads to the end of their relationship, when Den decides that Jan is too posh for him, and so by the summer of that year orders her to leave.

The Queen Vic is floundering without Angie, a fact that she seems to delight over, and the sheer pleasure of watching Den suffer is all she needs to make her "grin and bear" The Dagmar's yuppie clientele. However, behind her front, Angie is a wreck, drinking more heavily than ever and going on "over the top" shopping sprees. By May 1987, the divorce papers finally come through, but it seems that neither Den nor Angie are coping without each other, and although they both profess to be pleased about the divorce, it is obvious to everyone else that they are far from happy. Seeing her parents' misery, Sharon decides to intervene by setting up a dinner date between them, which ends with them having sex. Angie and Den decide to keep their brief reconciliation quiet. By the end of the year, Angie finally loses her patience with The Dagmar clientele, and after punching one of the customers in the face, she leaves town for a couple of days. Upon her return, she is in great pain, but hides it and marches over to The Queen Vic during the New Year's Eve celebrations and offers to come back to work, but only as Den's business partner and not his wife.

In 1988, Angie is rushed to hospital with kidney failure brought on by her excessive alcohol abuse. Upon her recovery, Angie decides to take a well-earned holiday to Spain with her friends, Sonny and Ree. This leads to Angie and Sonny falling in love and embarking on an affair. Sonny makes arrangements for them to start a new life together, running a bar in Spain.

Angie returns to Walford, with her plans still secret, and tries to show interest in Den's plan to move the location of The Queen Vic, but it is plain to see that her mind is elsewhere. Den soon realises that she is seeing someone else, and although he does not care that she is with another man, he is concerned for the state of his business. Den visits a solicitor and returns with papers protecting himself and his business should Angie decide to leave him again. Angie decides to leave in May 1988, still under a cloak of secrecy and only divulging her plan to leave on the night of her departure. Unfortunately for Angie, Den cruelly informs her that he has arranged things so that she won't be able to get a penny out of him. Following their final showdown, Angie gets into her taxi and leaves Walford. This is Angie's last appearance.

Later in 1988, while Den is in prison for his role in torching the Dagmar in revenge for Kathy Beale's rape at the hands of Willmott-Brown, Sharon decides to join Angie in Spain and arrives unannounced, only to learn from Sonny that Angie has left him and moved to the United States. It is subsequently revealed that she moved to Miami where she remarries in February 1991. Sharon joins Angie in 1995 following the breakdown of her marriage to Grant Mitchell (Ross Kemp).

In May 2001, Sharon returns to Walford, and in April 2002, news reaches Walford that Angie has died. Sharon brings Angie's body back to Walford to be buried in the local cemetery. After the funeral ceremony, Sharon confides in Angie's closest surviving friends, Pauline Fowler (Wendy Richard) and Pat Evans (Pam St Clement), that years of heavy drinking finally caught up with Angie and she died a slow painful decline due to cirrhosis of the liver, having also experienced alcohol-related dementia. Sharon emotionally explains Angie asked her to give the pretence of a heart attack when the time came. Despite having remarried, Angie had requested to be buried next to Den, which Sharon does for her when she returns the body to London in order to reunite her two deceased parents. Sharon's new club is renamed Angie's Den in honour of her parents.

Den was supposedly shot dead by a mystery hitman in February 1989. However, the body thought to be Den's is actually that of the mysterious Mr. Vinnicombe, the boss of The Firm, who ordered Den's assassination. Fourteen years after Den's disappearance, it is revealed that he had not died after all, but had faked his own death in order to escape the gangsters who had been employed to kill him. However, Den does die at the hands of his second wife Chrissie Watts (Tracy-Ann Oberman) in February 2005, after being bludgeoned to death with Pauline's doorstop. A body found under the basement of The Queen Vic six months later is quickly identified as Den's, and he is buried in the grave next to Angie.

In February 2025, Sharon becomes trapped on the staircase in the Vic hallway after an explosion in the pub caused by Reiss Colwell (Jonny Freeman) and Cindy Beale (Michelle Collins). While stuck, she hallucinates Angie, who tells her that she misses her and that Sharon is doing brilliantly without her. Angie encourages Sharon to call for help before fading away, prompting Sharon's ex-husband Grant to come to her rescue.

== Reception ==
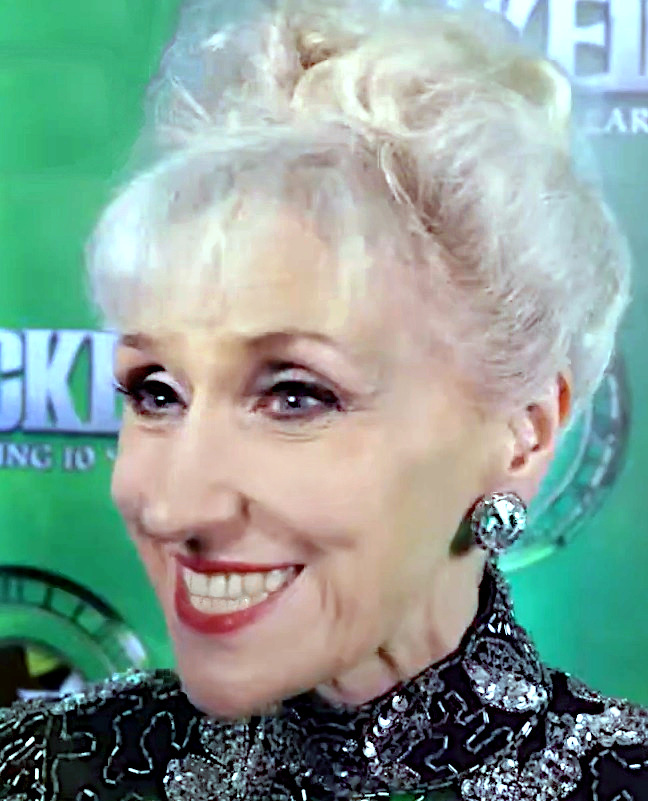
Anita Dobson's (pictured) portrayal of Angie was well received and has been described as a "phenomonon".

Angie became one of the most iconic and popular characters in EastEnders' history. The character was said to become such a "phenomenon" that when Anita Dobson announced she would be leaving in 1988, her departure was reported on the BBC Six O'Clock News. She was voted the number one television barmaid, the fifth most popular Queen of soaps and the 75th greatest television character of all time in separate Channel 4 polls. The moment that Den served Angie divorce papers was voted the number one soap moment of all time in a 2004 poll. In a 2021 Radio Times poll, Angie and Den were voted as the joint fourth best "soap pub landlord", receiving 8% of the votes. In 2020, Sara Wallis and Ian Hyland from The Daily Mirror placed Angie 25th on their ranked list of the Best EastEnders characters of all time, calling her a "Permed pub landlady" who "spent three years in Walford battling alcoholism and her feckless husband Den." In 2023, Lewis Knight from Radio Times wrote that Angie was the "original brassy and bold landlady of the Queen Vic pub".

Angie's 2025 return was shortlisted for "Scene of the Year" at the 2025 British Soap Awards. It was also longlisted for "Best Showstopper" at the 2025 Inside Soap Awards.

== See also ==
- List of soap opera villains
