= James Willmott-Brown =

Fictional character from EastEnders

- EastEnders character
- Portrayed by: William Boyde
- Duration: 1986–1989, 1992, 2017
- First appearance: Episode 114; 20 March 1986
- Last appearance: Episode 5626; 28 December 2017
- Introduced by: Julia Smith (1986); Leonard Lewis (1992); Sean O'Connor (2017)
- Book appearances: Taking Chances
In-universe information
- Occupation: Army officer Brewery manager Pub landlord Businessman
- Father: Denis Willmott-Brown
- Wife: Elizabeth Willmott-Brown (backstory)
- Sons: Luke Browning; Josh Hemmings
- Daughters: Fi Browning

James Willmott-Brown (also credited as Willmott-Brown and Mr Willmott-Brown) is a fictional character from the BBC soap opera EastEnders, played by William Boyde. The character originally appeared in Albert Square from 1986 to 1989, where he established the square's second pub – "The Dagmar" – and embarked on a conflict with his business rival Den Watts (Leslie Grantham). It was then Willmott-Brown then developed a romantic obsession with central protagonist Kathy Beale (Gillian Taylforth), who started out as his employee up until their relationship took a disturbing turn of events when he raped Kathy in 1988; this led to Willmott-Brown becoming hated on the square, getting embroiled in a feud with Kathy's husband Pete (Peter Dean) in the process.

Following his imprisonment for Kathy's rape, Willmott-Brown made a brief comeback in 1992 after he moved back into Albert Square until both Kathy and Pete forced him to leave after confronting him over the impact of his past actions towards them. Following an absence of 25 years, Willmott-Brown returned on 22 September 2017 as the show's overarching antagonist upon being revealed to be the boss of Max Branning (Jake Wood) in their vengeful plot to destroy the square; with Willmott-Brown serving as the true mastermind behind the events in Max's revenge story arc carried out by his company, Weyland & Co. The character departed once again on 28 December 2017 after his scheme to recoup his so-called romance with Kathy by controlling the Square had ultimately failed, and he was left bedridden upon being disowned by both his son and daughter for his actions.

== Development ==
=== Initial stints and rape ===
In 1988, the character of Willmott-Brown raped Kathy Beale (Gillian Taylforth) in a "prolific and controversial [...] deplorable" rape storyline. Taylforth was apprehensive about the storyline when it was pitched to her, commenting that she "didn't think it was a great idea at first" as her character had already been raped and "didn't think Wilmott-Brown was a very likely rapist." Taylforth said she "loved working" with Boyde, saying he played the part "brilliantly" as well as it being his own idea "to step up Wilmott-Brown's drinking in order for the rape to make some sense." Writer Colin Brake has commented that "all the pieces [were] in place [...] Pete [Kathy's husband] was away [...] Willmott-Brown asked Kathy to stay after work for a drink. The situation got out of hand and what began as seduction ended in rape." The episode, which aired on 7 July 1988 was watched by 19 million viewers. This was 2 million more than the average viewership at the time.

The storyline has generally been received well by critics. The Guardian newspaper described the storyline as "a slow-burn as the tension rose over weeks and months [...] which culminated in rape and then followed Kathy sensitively through the aftermath." This included the consequences for Willmott-Brown; the BBC maintains that with their rape storylines, "the consequences of the crime are always explored, both for the attacker and the victim." However, one prominent critic of the storyline was Mary Whitehouse of the National Viewers' and Listeners' Association. Following the airing of the rape episode in 1988, Whitehouse branded it "totally unsuitable for family viewing". She wrote to the then Home Secretary, Douglas Hurd, to try to stop the episode being repeated in the soap's weekly Sunday omnibus, suggesting that it violated the BBC's own code of practice.

Boyde departed the role in 1989, when his character was found guilty of rape. The storyline "had massive repercussions for the residents of Walford", notably for Den Watts (Leslie Grantham), as the storyline resulted in his imprisonment for "taking the rap" over The Dagmar fire caused by The Firm. Boyde returned in 1992 for a short stint, which saw Willmott-Brown "try and reintegrate in Walford" but a "lack of remorse saw him receive significant backlash."

=== Reintroduction (2017) ===
Boyde reprised his role as Willmott-Brown in September 2017 and the actor expressed his delight at returning to the serial. Willmott-Brown returns to overpower Albert Square, the show's setting, and destroy "everything and anyone in their way". Duncan Lindsay of the Metro reported that his return storyline would centre around "power, control, money and revenge" as well as confronting Kathy, who Willmott-Brown cites as the person who destroyed his life.

The characters of Fi Browning (Lisa Faulkner) and Josh Hemmings (Eddie Eyre), who joined the show in 2017, were revealed as Willmott-Brown's children. Faulkner's character was explained as Willmott-Brown's daughter, Sophie Willmott-Brown, who appeared in the serial in 1987 and 1992 as a child, portrayed by Natasha Knight. Adam Astill was recast in the role of Willmott-Brown's son, Luke Willmott-Brown, (now Luke Browning), who previously appeared, portrayed by Henry Povey, alongside his sister. The build-up to Willmott-Brown's return began when Max Branning (Jake Wood) returned to the serial after being falsely imprisoned for the murder of Lucy Beale (Hetti Bywater). Max agrees with Willmott-Brown's plans as he is unaware of his past and understands that he is a "wronged man". Of his return, Boyde said: "I'm delighted to immerse myself once more in the fascinating world of soap land." Willmott-Brown made an unannounced departure on 28 December 2017, alongside Fi and brother-in-law Hugo Browning (Simon Williams) at the conclusion of their storyline.

== Storylines ==
=== 1986–1989 ===
James Willmott-Brown first arrived in Albert Square in March 1986 as an area manager for 'Luxford and Copley', the brewery that owns The Queen Victoria public house within the square's borough Walford.

Soon enough Willmott-Brown decides to move to the square and buys the 43 Albert Square house that was formerly owned by bank clerk Debbie Wilkins (Shirley Cheriton); she had just sold the property following the death of her fiancé Andy O'Brien (Ross Davidson) death. For a short while he dated Debbie, but it doesn't last for too long. Willmott-Brown then had a short-lived romance with fellow neighbour Pat Wicks (Pam St Clement), but they broke up after she tried to seduce him unsuccessfully. During the early years, he is friendly with Colin Russell (Michael Cashman).

Originally an ex-army officer many years ago, Willmott-Brown became a brewery manager before arriving in the square. He soon gives up his job and ends up buying a disused pub on Turpin Road, refurbishing it as a wine bar called "The Dagmar". In turn this sparked a competitive rivalry with The Queen Vic as its landlord owner, Den Watts (Leslie Grantham), is unhappy about the competition. Willmott-Brown soon begins a conflict with Den when the latter's estranged wife, Angie (Anita Dobson), is hired to work as manageress of the former's bar; Willmott-Brown further antagonizes Den by allowing Angie and their adopted daughter, Sharon (Letitia Dean), to live in the flat above. The Dagmar opens for business and both Willmott-Brown and Den compete for best decorated pub in 'The London In Bloom' competition and in a five-a-side football match, and constantly try to poach each other's staff.

The following year, however, the Dagmar begins to lose business as the residents of Walford never really take to the upper-class establishment; Willmott-Brown soon finds himself in further competition with another winebar called "The Strokes", which Den takes over after giving up tenancy of The Queen Vic. It was then Gregory Mantel (Pavel Douglas), a notorious gangster who is herald of Walford's criminal organization called "The Firm" arrives and demands that Willmott-Brown allow his company, 'Walford Investments', to buy into the business. Willmott-Brown refuses, and as a result none of his creditors will trade with him; so consequently The Dagmar business suffers even more. Later on, Willmott-Brown learns that Den is in league with the Firm and reports him to the police for shady dealings at the Strokes wine bar. However, this backfires when Pat's son and barman Simon Wicks (Nick Berry) overhears Willmott-Brown talking to the police and tells Den. When the residents learn that Willmott-Brown has informed the police, he loses all his customers and in turn Willmott-Brown crumbes to the brink of financial ruin. This makes him frantic and his behaviour becomes erratic.

By then, Willmott-Brown has become closely acquainted with local resident Kathy Beale (Gillian Taylforth). It all started when he gave a job as a barmaid, but this causes problems with Kathy's husband Pete (Peter Dean) when he opposes her decision. The rift worsens when it becomes clear that Willmott-Brown has a romantic interest in Kathy. With everyone now ignoring him, Kathy soon becomes his only friend. He buys her presents and confides in her about the sorry state of his business, the break-up of his marriage and how it affected his two children, Sophie (Natasha Knight) and Luke (Henry Power), respectively. Soon enough Pete grows jealous and is furious about the amount of time Kathy spends with Willmott-Brown, but their constant arguing only drives her away. One night, after Kathy argues with Pete again, Willmott-Brown invites her to his place for a glass of wine after work. When it becomes clear that he is trying to seduce her, she tries to leave but he refuses to take no for an answer and the seduction ends in rape. Den finds Kathy an emotional wreck. When he realises what has happened, he takes Kathy home to her family and her niece, Michelle Fowler (Susan Tully), persuades her to report the rape to the police. Den also calls his contacts within the Firm, Joanne Francis (Pamela Salem) and Brad Williams (Jonathan Stratt), to demand revenge. He watches gleefully as a fire-bomb is thrown into the Dagmar and it catches fire. Unfortunately for Den, this act leads to his imprisonment, after The Firm expect him to take the rap for the arson and later decide that they want him dead.

When Willmott-Brown returns days later, he is horrified to see what has happened to the Dagmar. He also receives extreme hostility from residents of the square. Willmott-Brown is later arrested for Kathy's rape, but he claims that Kathy consented and tries to make it out that it is common knowledge that they were having an affair. When asked about Kathy's bruises, though, he claims that they are the result of their rampant sexual encounter before suggesting that Pete is a violent man and Kathy has lied to avoid his wrath. Willmott-Brown thinks he has said enough to fool the police, but is left stunned when he is charged with rape. He stands trial in April 1989, but not before attempting to bribe Kathy to drop the charges. She allows him to think that she is ready to take his hush money, only to reveal that police detective inspector Bob Ashley (Robin Lermitte) is listening next door. Kathy is relieved when he is found guilty and imprisoned for three years. However, Pete and Kathy's marriage is destroyed as Kathy cannot stand him touching her and they separate soon afterwards; though both the couple and their son, Ian (Adam Woodyatt), are left devastated by the damage that Willmott-Brown has done to them.

=== 1992 ===
Nearly three years later, Willmott-Brown resurfaces upon the square in January 1992; he had been released from imprisonment. He plans to move back to Walford and set up another business there. At one point he seeks to buy the flats that Kathy's new boyfriend Phil Mitchell (Steve McFadden) and his brother Grant (Ross Kemp), known as the "Mitchell Brothers", are selling. However, it soon becomes clear that Willmott-Brown also has unfinished business with Kathy; he sends her a tape asking her to meet him at his hotel in Hampstead. He promises that if she objects, he will disappear and never return. His reappearance sends shockwaves around the square and Pete arranges for Ian along with their friends, which include Pat's spouse Frank Butcher (Mike Reid) and fellow punter Big Ron (Ron Tarr), to become his mob so they can track Willmott-Brown down as Kathy plans to meet him. Kathy gets there first and encounters Willmott-Brown, who explains his tale of his hard time in prison and how much he has changed; Kathy disbelieves him and she asks him to leave the Square for good. Despite his promise, however, he refuses to leave Walford. Kathy then leaves feeling repulsed and cheated, but then Pete has come to settle his score not long afterwards. Pete and his mob all force him into their car and drive him to Pete's high-rise flat building, where Pete threatens to push him off unless he signs a paper stating that he will leave Walford and never return. Willmott-Brown immediately moves out of the square, but not before retaliating against Pete by phoning his solicitor and taking out an injunction on his love rival. In addition, he continues sending Kathy tapes that each address his undying love for her.

Eventually, Kathy and Pete confront Willmott-Brown at his house to deal with him once and for all; he and Pete nearly come to blows as they insult one another in front of Kathy, who ultimately breaks down in tears by relaying her hurt and anger over the rape as well as her fury that Willmott-Brown has never apologised for the act. Willmott-Brown protests that they had something truly special, but after a heated conversation, Kathy makes him realise how deluded he is by showing him the destruction he'd caused her and her family. In a bid for attention, Willmott-Brown threatens to commit suicide but Kathy stops him, refusing to allow him off the hook so easily. Willmott-Brown finally apologises for raping her and begs for her forgiveness. Kathy is pleased he is sorry, but refuses to forgive him, feeling her forgiveness would give him permission to stop being sorry and she tells him she is never going to do anything he asks, ever again, not even that. The confrontation and the apology finally gives Kathy the closure she needs, while a defeated Willmott-Brown leaves Walford.

In 1994, Kathy begins having recurring nightmares about Willmott-Brown and later confides to Phil about what happened to her in the past; this prompts Phil to search for Willmott-Brown and he ends up tracking down the latter's wife Elizabeth (Helena Breck), who later reveals to Phil that her husband is back in prison for raping another woman.

=== 2017 ===
Over twenty-five years later after leaving Walford, Willmott-Brown anonymously lays flowers addressed to Kathy at a memorial for her step-grandson Steven Beale (Aaron Sidwell). The following day, Willmott-Brown meets with his children — Sophie, who is now going by the name "Fi", (now Lisa Faulkner), Luke (now Adam Astill) and Josh Hemmings (Eddie Eyre) — and Elizabeth's brother Hugo Browning (Simon Williams), before introducing himself to Fi's partner, Max Branning (Jake Wood).

The next day, Willmott-Brown has a meeting with Luke and Hugo; they discuss purchasing the café and Willmott-Brown tells them he has a better plan for the premises than their idea of studio flats. Willmott-Brown arrives in Albert Square and lets himself into the café, before he joins Luke and Hugo in going through their development plans for Albert Square. Soon enough Luke starts a relationship with Kathy's other child and Phil's son Ben (Harry Reid), but initially breaks up with him after learning of Ben's relation to his parents; Willmott-Brown instructs Luke to reconcile with Ben, which works successfully despite Luke questioning his father about his interest in Ben and Kathy respectively. After Max manages to persuade Ian and his wife Jane (Laurie Brett), to sell the café and move away, Willmott-Brown tells Max he wants Ian to remain. Willmott-Brown later has a meeting with his children; with Fi promsing her father that she will get the sealed bids from Max, whilst at the same time Luke will persuade Ben's surrogate half-brother Jay Brown (Jamie Borthwick) to sell the car lot land. When Max contemplates getting the sealed bids from a work laptop owned by council member Carmel Kazemi (Bonnie Langford), whom he is seducing as part of the scheme, he refuses to go through with it and phones Willmott-Brown to inform him about it. Another meeting is held where Max tells Willmott-Brown and his children that he doesn't want to be a part of their plan any longer. Fi turns up to see Max at Carmel's house, where they have sex. However, what Max doesn't know is that Fi has hacked into Carmel's computer and stolen the sealed bids. When Willmott-Brown finds out about Max and Fi's relationship, Fi presents him with the sealed bids to earn her father's approval.

On Hallowen later that night, Willmott-Brown finally comes face-to-face with Kathy as she shuts up the café she is startled when he comes in and casually greets her. Kathy secretly takes hold of a knife as Willmott-Brown begins talking to her, explaining that he has been diagnosed with terminal liver cancer and that the two are more alike then they would like to admit before claiming the reason for his visit is to move on from the past. Kathy rebuffs his claims and demands that Willmott-Brown explain truthfully about what happened on the night he raped her; when he refuses to do so, Kathy retells it and ends up clarifying that Willmott-Brown had fully intended to rape her all along when he locked her in The Dagmar with him that night. Kathy tells Willmott-Brown that he has just scared her in the same manner that he raped her that night, but Willmott-Brown doesn't respond much to her argument; he eventually departs but not before leaving Kathy his address and subtly threatening her.

A few nights later, Willmott-Brown instructs Luke to join Phil and Ben in celebrating the birthday meal of Phil's daughter and Ben's sister Louise (Tilly Keeper) in order to make sure Phil knows nothing about Willmott-Brown seeing Kathy, believing Kathy would tell him. Luke contacts Willmott-Brown to inform him that Phil is unaware. Kathy confides in Ian that Willmott-Brown is back and Ian contacts Phil, who soon decides to confront Willmott-Brown on behalf of Kathy and Ian themselves. Phil visits Willmott-Brown and warns him away from Kathy, but realises Luke is Willmott-Brown's son when he finds a photo of them. Phil tells Kathy that Luke is Willmott-Brown's son and they attempt to warn him away from Ben to no avail. Ben later confronts Phil over his interverence and when Kathy tries to get Ben and Phil to make up, Kathy tells Ben that Phil was protecting him as Willmott-Brown raped her. After struggling to process what he is told, Ben is determined to hurt Willmott-Brown, but Kathy orders Ben to keep out of it as it happened to her and not him. Ben confronts Luke with what he has been told and Luke tells Ben that Willmott-Brown wants to meet him. Ben takes a hammer when he meets him and without Luke's presence, Ben threatens Willmott-Brown, but he insists to Ben that he and Kathy were having an affair and she consented. Luke rushes into the office and pulls Ben off Willmott-Brown, who tells Ben he knows he doesn't trust or believe Kathy.

By this point, Willmott-Brown's scheme looks set to come to fruition thanks to Max's compliance. When Max's eldest daughter Lauren (Jacqueline Jossa), finds out about Project Dagmar and the model showing how Albert Square will be, Willmott-Brown demands to Max that Lauren keeps quiet. Willmott-Brown meets Lauren when she refuses to back down and he convinces her that the project has been dropped and to delete photos of the plans. Fi finds out that the Carters have raised £50,000 and Willmott-Brown, Luke and Hugo later arrive and tells them they own Grafton Hill. They serve the Carters with an eviction notice, putting up the money owed to the original £60,000. Kathy and Ian are shocked to see him in the pub. Willmott-Brown reveals that they plan to turn their obtained buildings into luxury flats. When Max proposes to Fi, Willmott-Brown and Luke reveal that they have used him as they have doubted his loyalty and burn his cheque. Willmott-Brown orders Josh to serve an eviction notice on Ian after Lauren refuses to do so.

A few days later, Ian arranges to meet Willmott-Brown and tapes their conversation; Willmott-Brown initially tells Ian that he and Kathy loved each other but eventually admits to raping Kathy, before having Ian restrained and deleting their conversation. Josh soon visits Lauren and tells her the development can be stopped, but he needs her help whilst he accesses Willmott-Brown computer that has documents to prove that Willmott-Brown bribes council officials. Whilst Willmott-Brown and Fi attend a press launch, Josh downloads files that can get the development stopped and Lauren gets arresting when she stages a protest at the launch to hold Willmott-Brown and Fi up. When Willmott-Brown returns, Lauren contacts Josh and Willmott-Brown demands the downloaded files, so Josh decides to quit his job. Fi tries to get Josh to return, but he tells Fi that Willmott-Brown has ruined and controls their lives just like with their mothers. When Fi attempts to question Willmott-Brown over why he never allowed Josh's mother, Wendy, to get a job or why Elizabeth committed suicide, Willmott-Brown pushes her to the ground. Fi asks Kathy about the rape and her version causes Fi to be physically sick.

Towards the end of the year after Christmas, Fi tells Willmott-Brown that she believes he did rape Kathy and in turn he evicts her from his building. Willmott-Brown then goes to see Kathy and attempts to manipulate her into starting anew with him; Kathy appears to be interested at first, but then grabs Willmott-Brown at the front and stands up for herself by telling her tormentor that he is "going to hell" no matter what happens. When he returns to his office, Willmott-Brown is horrified to find that his safe has had a break-in and that all his documents – which he earlier showed to Fi about the secrecy of his illicit activities – are missing, just as the police arrive. Whilst desperately trying to destroy them, he suffers a heart attack. It soon transpires that Fi, disgusted with her father's callousness and the discovery that he raped Kathy, stole the documents and reported his illicit business activities to the police. After forcing Hugo to relinquish Weyland & Co of their power over the Square, destroying the company in the process, Fi visits Willmott-Brown in hospital and tells him she is not going to keep on trying to get his approval as she wanted his love. As Willmott-Brown reaches out for Fi, she tells the staff that she is not his daughter before leaving – having disowned her father as he is left to suffer alone.

== Reception ==
In 2020, Sara Wallis and Ian Hyland from The Daily Mirror placed James 69th on their ranked list of the best EastEnders characters of all time, calling him "Toff" and "a rotter in a suit". In February 2025, Radio Times ranked James as the 5th best EastEnders villain, with Laura Denby calling him "one of the most chilling villains in EastEnders history" and writing that "Boyde powerfully carried his alter ego's sickening demeanour" upon his return.

== In popular culture ==
A running joke in the 2015 episode of Catherine Tate's Nan titled "Knees Up Wilmott-Brown" involves the lead character, Nan, mistaking another character, Charles Wilmott, for the EastEnders character.

== See also ==
- List of soap opera villains
