= Home (2003 film) =

Home is a paranoid, darkly comic, hour-long television film made by the BBC and directed by Richard Curson Smith. He adapted it from a short story by J. G. Ballard in 2003. The plot follows a middle class man who chooses to abandon the outside world and restrict himself to not leaving his house, becoming a hermit. He soon starts to destroy his furniture to rid his life of clutter.

The viewer follows his plight through both his video diary (in which he addresses the viewer) and through traditional film cameras.

All he has is the food in his cupboard, and once the bills run out will have no gas or electricity - his mind soon becomes fevered. As he runs out of food he begins to consume shampoo, plants from his garden, his neighbours' cats (which he catches with a home-made trap) and anything else which crosses his path. In his increasing fear of the outside world he kills a man who comes to reclaim the television who insists upon entering, but refuses to hand over a cable which connects his video camera to his television.

He claims the house is revealing itself to him, beginning in the attic: a bright light appears and the room expands - this pattern continues and develops. Upon viewing his video diaries he notices the effect does not appear, and is concerned that it may be limited to his mind. The film ends with him killing a friend who breaks into his house following her concern for him - he soon puts her in his freezer and climbs in after her.

== Cast ==
- Antony Sher as Gerald Ballantyne
- Matilda Ziegler as Paula Goddard
- Deborah Findlay as Margaret Ballantyne
- Guy Henry as Martin
- Keith Allen as Repo Man
- Simon Nagra as Policeman
