= Tony Holland =

British screenwriter (1940–2007)

- Holland and Julia Smith, co-creators of EastEnders
- Born: Anthony John Holland; 18 January 1940; Shoeburyness, Essex, England
- Died: 28 November 2007 (aged 67); London, England
- Occupations: Screenwriter, actor
- Partner: Paul Wade (2007–2007; Tony's death)
- Writing career
- Notable work: EastEnders

Anthony John Holland (18 January 1940 – 28 November 2007) was a British screenwriter and actor. He is best known as the writer and co-creator (with Julia Smith) of the BBC soap opera EastEnders.

== Early life ==
Anthony John Holland was born on 18 January 1940 in Shoeburyness, Essex, England, the oldest of three children, to John and Pat Holland. His younger twin brothers were Allan and Bryn. As a military family, Holland moved around with the postings assigned to his father and spent time in Aldershot, Gravesend and Chelmsford.

== Career ==
Holland began his career as an actor, appearing in the 1966 Doctor Who serial The Savages and later Message for Posterity, a 1967 serial for The Wednesday Play. In the latter year, a play Holland had developed – The Isle is Full of Noises – was taken up by the BBC and produced by Thirty-Minute Theatre; it was from there that Holland turned to script-writing.

Through his agent, Holland landed a job as a writer and script editor on Z-Cars in 1970. It was here that he met producer and director Julia Smith, and started a long and successful working relationship with her. Holland and Smith became an established producer/script-editor team during their time on Z-Cars and went on to work for the BBC's hospital drama, Angels. It was during their time on Angels that the format of the programme was changed from weekly 50-minute-long episodes to a bi-weekly half-hour serial, with the further possibility of the show being aired all year round.

=== EastEnders ===
In 1983, the BBC approached Holland and Smith to produce a new programme for their channel, a bi-weekly soap-opera that would rival the long-established ITV favourites, Coronation Street, Crossroads and Emmerdale Farm. The BBC wanted this new serial to reflect 'London, today!' and together, Smith and Holland came up with the idea of a programme set in a Victorian square within the East End of London, focusing on its close working-class families and eccentric Cockney inhabitants. Thus, EastEnders was born.

Holland and Smith wanted the primary focus of EastEnders to be a large extended family, representative of the type most typically found in the East End of London. Holland was from a large London family himself, and in creating some of the series' characters, he was able to use some of his own experiences as inspiration for the central EastEnders clan the Beales and the Fowlers. In creating the stories and characters, Holland delved into family stories, past and present. His aunt Lou Beale came to inspire the EastEnders character of the same name, along with her two children Peter (Pete) and Pauline. Holland also used some of his experiences as a barman in London's pubs and clubs to create the dynamic pairing of Den and Angie Watts, the owners of the Queen Victoria public house.

Holland worked on EastEnders for four years, initially as script-editor and going on to script many episodes himself. After four years, Holland and Smith decided to leave EastEnders together in 1989 following a dispute with BBC bosses as to whether the character of Den Watts (played by Leslie Grantham) could return to the series following his exit in February of that year after being shot and supposedly killed. The character would ultimately return to the soap in 2003, having survived the shooting despite being presumed dead.

On his departure from EastEnders in 1989, Holland was approached by Ireland's national broadcaster RTÉ to give their new urban soap opera Fair City its structure and story-lines for the first season.

In 1991, Holland and Smith were hired by the BBC to produce Eldorado, loosely based around the lives of expats in Spain. Their new soap opera was launched in July 1992, but, plagued by a string of on- and off-screen problems, it received little of the success of EastEnders, and was axed a year later, in July 1993, despite a radical overhaul and improving ratings.

In 2001, Holland was awarded a Special Achievement Award from The British Soap Awards; and in 2004, he appeared on the Channel 4 documentary How Soaps Changed The World.

== Personal life and death ==
Holland entered into a civil partnership with Paul Wade in May 2007.

Holland died on 28 November 2007, aged 67, after a long illness. The following day's edition of EastEnders was dedicated to him.
