= Robin McCallum =

British actor and weather presenter (1961–2022)

Robin Peter McCallum (previously Robin Lermitte; 1961 – 15 August 2022) was a British actor and weather presenter.

== Career ==
=== Acting ===
McCallum initially worked as an actor in minor roles – most memorably as Detective Chief Superintendent David Graves in the BBC drama Between The Lines and as D.I. Bob Ashley in EastEnders (1988–1989). He played Piers in the Tales of the Unexpected (TV series) episode (9/6) "Wink Three Times" (1988). He made his television debut as Lord Alfred Douglas in the ITV series Oscar (1985).

=== ITV Weather ===
McCallum entered a competition on ITV's This Morning in 2002 to become ITV's newest weather presenter, which he subsequently won. As a result, he became a national ITV Weather presenter, until he joined the ITV London regional weather team alongside fellow forecasters Manali Lukha and Chrissie Reidy in 2005. At times he also appeared on ITV Anglia and ITV Meridian.

McCallum co-presented the ITN produced London Tonight, the regional news programme for ITV London, on occasions throughout 2010.

In August 2013 he appeared on ITV Channel Television.

McCallum died in August 2022.
