= Leslie Schofield =

British actor (born 1938)

- Born: 12 December 1938 (age 87); Oldham, Lancashire, England
- Occupation: Actor
- Years active: 1968–2006

Leslie Schofield (born 12 December 1938) is a retired English actor who is most famous in the UK for his role as Jeff Healy in the soap opera EastEnders, which he played from 1997 to 2000.

== Early life ==
Some of Schofield's earlier acting experiences took place when he served in the Fleet Air Arm of the Royal Navy. After performances at HMS Ariel (later HMS Daedalus) he was moved to HMS Seahawk near Helston in Cornwall, where he participated in amateur productions. It was his performance as John Proctor in the Navy Drama Festival of 1963 which brought him to the attention of Walter Lucas, the adjudicator and then director of the British Drama League, who helped him to leave the navy and start in repertory theatre.

== Career ==
Schofield appeared as Chief Bast, an Imperial Officer aboard the doomed Death Star, in George Lucas's original Star Wars (1977) film. He also appeared in Star Wars Holiday Special (1978), as the producers used deleted scenes and stock footage from it. His other film appearances included The Body Stealers (1969), Twinky (1969), Villain (1971), The Ruling Class (1972), The Glitterball (1977), The Wild Geese (1978), Force 10 from Navarone (1978), Silver Dream Racer (1980) and Dead Man's Folly (1986).

Schofield's television appearances in science fiction include two Doctor Who stories, The War Games (1969) and The Face of Evil (1977), and as prison ship officer Raiker in the Blake's 7 episode "Spacefall" (1978). He appeared in an episode of Midsomer Murders entitled "Vixen’s Run" and an episode of Minder, "You Lose Some, You Win Some". Schofield also played Reginald Perrin's son-in-law, Tom, in the third series of The Fall and Rise of Reginald Perrin, Len in The Smoking Room, the father in the BBC children's drama Jonny Briggs, and appeared in the CBBC comedy show ChuckleVision.

In 1997, Schofield was cast as Jeff Healy in the soap opera EastEnders, a role he played until 2000. His character unsuccessfully proposed to Pauline Fowler (played by Wendy Richard). He had appeared in EastEnders briefly in 1988 and 1989 playing a different character, Brian Wicks, ex-husband of established character Pat (Pam St Clement).

== Partial filmography ==
Year	Title	Role	Notes
1969	The Body Stealers	Gate Guard	
1970	Twinky	Very English Police Sergeant	
1971	Villain	Detective Constable	
1972	The Ruling Class	McKyle's Assistant	
1976	The Eagle has Landed	German Pilot	Uncredited
1977	Star Wars	Commander Bast	Credit as Commander #1
1977	The Glitterball	Radar operator	Uncredited
1978	The Wild Geese	Hitman at Club	Uncredited
1978	Star Wars Holiday Special	Commander Bast	Archive footage
1978	Force 10 from Navarone	Interrogation Officer 1	
1978	The Famous Five	Alfredo	Episode: Five Have a Wonderful Time
1980	Silver Dream Racer	Reporter	
1986	Dead Man's Folly	Mr. Tucker	Uncredited
1986	Clockwise	Policeman Arresting Pat	
