= Matilda Ziegler =

British actress (born 1964)

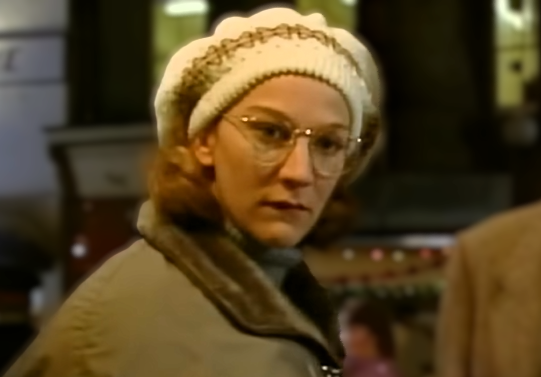
- Matilda Ziegler as Irma Gobb in "Merry Christmas, Mr. Bean" (1992)
- Born: Matilda Florence Elizabeth Ziegler; 23 July 1964 (age 62); Ashford, Kent, England
- Occupation: Actress
- Years active: 1987–present
- Spouse: Louis Hilyer (m. 2004)
- Children: 3

Matilda Florence Elizabeth Ziegler (born 23 July 1964) is an English actress. She is best known for her roles as Donna Ludlow in EastEnders, Irma Gobb in Mr. Bean, and Pearl Pratt in Lark Rise to Candleford.

== Television and film career ==
Ziegler's first screen role was in her early twenties, during 1987–1989: she appeared in the BBC One soap opera EastEnders, playing Donna Ludlow, the illegitimate daughter of series regular Kathy Beale. Donna's tragic storylines included prostitution, an attempted gang rape, heroin addiction and finally her death from a heroin overdose. The final scenes of Ziegler's character, who had choked to death on her own vomit, have been hailed as one of the most powerful anti-drug images ever screened on the programme. She left EastEnders in April 1989.

In the early 1990s, Ziegler starred in the ITV comedy Mr. Bean, in which she played multiple characters, especially a three-episode stint as Irma Gobb, the title character's long-suffering girlfriend. She reprised her role as Gobb, voicing her in Mr. Bean: The Animated Series, from 2002 to 2004, and in the revived series from 2015 to 2019.

Other television credits include Lark Rise to Candleford (2008–2010), in which she played the part of Pearl Pratt, in the BBC adaptation of Flora Thompson's novel; Harbour Lights (1999); Where the Heart Is (2000); Holby City (2003); An Unsuitable Job for a Woman (1998); The Bill (2003); and Home, alongside Anthony Sher in an adaptation of J. G. Ballard's novel.

Ziegler played Ruth, wife of car salesman Toni, in the BBC sitcom Swiss Toni (2003–2004). She also appeared in the BAFTA Television Award-winning drama Sex Traffic (2004). In 2005, she played Christine Miller in the fourth series of The Inspector Lynley Mysteries, and in 2007, she guest-starred in the BBC One daytime medical drama Doctors as Jess Butler. She also appeared in Outnumbered, Lewis (in "The Soul of Genius", 2012), Death in Paradise (2013), and Vera (in the episode "Young Gods", 2013).

In 2015, she appeared in an episode of Foyle's War, and in series 4 episode of Call the Midwife. In 2020, she appeared in a second season episode of The Alienist, and appeared in two episodes of The Girlfriend Experience in 2021.

Ziegler's film roles include Decadence (1994), Jilting Joe (1998), City Slacker (2012), and The Rhythm Section (2019), in which she played Blake Lively's mother.

== Stage and radio career ==
Ziegler has appeared in many stage productions, including Twelfth Night for the Royal Shakespeare Company (2001); the theatrical version of Mr. Bean; Women Laughing at the Royal Court Theatre; Volpone, Inadmissible Evidence and Machinal, all at the National Theatre; Featuring Loretta and The Memory of Water – both at the Hampstead Theatre; The Lady from the Sea, Lyric Hammersmith/West Yorkshire Playhouse (1994: TMA Award, nomination for Laurence Olivier Award) and also starred as Sheila Birling in Stephen Daldry's award winning production of An Inspector Calls at the Aldwych Theatre and for the production's Australian tour, along with Lady Sneerwell in Deborah Warner's 2011 production of The School for Scandal at the Barbican Centre. She later appeared in Downstate in Chicago and at the National Theatre, a co production with Steppenwolf Theatre Company.

Her radio work has included playing Dr Ruth Anderson in BBC Radio 4's Rigor Mortis (2004–2006). She also featured in Giles Wemmbley-Hogg Goes Off in 2010, and as Princess Theresa of Liechtenstein in the fourth series of Cabin Pressure in 2013, a role she reprised for the show's final episode in 2014. She had previously played an air traffic controller and a paramedic in the second episode of the first series.

== Personal life ==
In July 2004, Ziegler married actor Louis Hilyer; the couple have three children.

== Filmography ==
=== Film ===
Year	Title	Role	Notes
1994	Decadence	The Entourage	
1998	Jilting Joe	Rona McLaughty	
2004	The Audition	Pompous Woman	Short film
2006	Talk	Janice	Short film
2020	The Rhythm Section	Monica Patrick	
2022	Living	Prim Lady	

=== Television ===
Year	Title	Role	Notes
1987–1989	EastEnders	Donna Ludlow	119 episodes
1990–1992	Mr. Bean	The Waitress	Episode: "The Return of Mr. Bean"
1990–1992	Mr. Bean	Irma Gobb [Girlfriend]	3 episodes
1990–1992	Mr. Bean	Policewoman	Episode: "Mr. Bean Goes to Town"
1990–1992	Mr. Bean	Woman at bus stop	Episode: "Mr. Bean Rides Again"
1991	Police Station	Police Woman	Television short
1991	The Bus Stop	Mother	Television short
1993–2003	The Bill	Monica Skinner / Helen Proctor	3 episodes
1994	Against All Odds: Lost and Found	Amy Chadwick	Television film
1995	My Good Friend	Betty	7 episodes
1996	In Suspicious Circumstances	Beattie Pace	Episode: "Who's Sorry Now?"
1996	Casualty	Nula Snape	Episode: "The Homecoming"
1997	Mr. White Goes to Westminster	Labour Fixer	Television film
1998	An Unsuitable Job for a Woman	Hilary Hampson	Episode: "A Last Embrace"
1999	Harbour Lights	Jane Ford	10 episodes
2000	Where the Heart Is	Sally	Episode: "No Regrets"
2000	Too Much Sun	Sandi	6 episodes
2001	Armadillo	Potts	1 episode
2002–present	Mr. Bean: The Animated Series	Irma Gobb (voice)	26 episodes
2003	Holby City	Andrea Rowlands	Episode: "A Kind of Loving"
2003	Killing Hitler	Mrs. Holmes	Television film
2003	Home	Paula Goddard	Television film
2003–2004	Swiss Toni	Ruth / Ruth Gordon	15 episodes
2004	Family Business	Carol Sullivan	1 episode
2004	15 Storeys High	Karin	Episode: "Errol's Women"
2004	Sex Traffic	Lou	Miniseries
2005	The Inspector Lynley Mysteries	Christine Miller	2 episodes
2007	Outnumbered	Kate	Episode: "The Quiet Night In"
2007	Lead Balloon	Fiona	Episode: "Points"
2007, 2010	Doctors	Jess Butler / Susan Oakley	2 episodes
2008–2011	Lark Rise to Candleford	Pearl Pratt	36 episodes
2010	Summer in Transylvania	Ms. Kubilikilik	2 episodes
2012	Lewis	Helena Wright	Episode: "The Soul of Genius"
2012	The Poison Tree	Alison Larch	1 episode
2013	Death in Paradise	Janice Palmer	Episode: "A Dash of Sunshine"
2013	Vera	Mary Culvert	Episode: "Young Gods"
2015	Foyle's War	Lady Ava Woolf	Episode: "Trespass"
2015	Call the Midwife	Dulcie Roland	1 episode
2020	The Alienist	Mallory Hunter	Episode: "Angel of Darkness: The Last Exit to Brooklyn"
2021	The Girlfriend Experience	Dr. Lindbergh	2 episodes
2022	Miss Scarlet and The Duke	Mary Dawson	Episode: "A Pauper's Grave"
2023	Maternal	Becky Hillford	
2024	The Outlaws	Judge	Series 3; 4 episodes Grave"
2026	Father Brown	Mildred Granby	Season 13, Episode 4: "The Crackpot and The Dummy"
