= Peter Dean (actor) =

British actor

- Born: 2 May 1939 (age 87); Hoxton, East London, England
- Occupation: Actor
- Years active: 1970–present
- Children: 1

Peter Dean (born 2 May 1939) is a British actor, best known for his roles as Pete Beale in EastEnders, Jeff Bateman in Coronation Street and Sergeant Jack Wilding in Woodentop.

== Early life and education ==
Dean was born in Hoxton, East London, and was an acquaintance of the Kray twins while he was growing up. He went to primary school in Holloway and technical school at King's Cross, where he learned plumbing and bricklaying. He began drama lessons at 14 when his grandmother, the music hall artist Lilly Randall, realised that he was dyslexic. As a boy, Dean worked on a fruit and veg stall in Chapel Market in North London.

== Career ==
Dean decided on a career in acting after actress Prunella Scales witnessed him rehearsing Shakespeare in Petticoat Lane Market and advised him to take drama classes. Aged 16 he studied under Joan Littlewood and has been an actor since he was 18.

Dean's breakthrough performance was playing criminal 'Jack Lynn' in Law And Order (1978). He went on to have roles in television shows such as Minder (1979); Shoestring (1979); Hammer House of Horror (1980) and The Chinese Detective (1981). In 1980, he played Jeff "Fangio" Bateman in Coronation Street; in 1982, Dean played the role of a police constable in Shine on Harvey Moon and, in 1983, he was cast as Sergeant Jack Wilding in Woodentop (the Pilot of ITV police drama The Bill).

Film credits include: Up Pompeii (1971), Murder by Decree (1979), Sweet William (1980), The Fiendish Plot of Dr. Fu Manchu (1980), P'tang, Yang, Kipperbang (1982), and as a bouncer in The Great Rock 'n' Roll Swindle (1980).

In 1984, at the invitation of producer Julia Smith, Dean was offered the role of Pete Beale, an original character in the BBC's new soap opera EastEnders; Dean was chosen after the actor who originally auditioned for the role (Leslie Grantham) was selected to play the character Den Watts instead. Dean played the cockney fruit and veg trader from the show's inception in February 1985 until his departure in May 1993. In reality, Dean's contract was terminated following irreconcilable differences with the show's producers. Since his departure, he has publicly slammed the producers for culling his character and did an exposé with the Sun newspaper, where he revealed some of the show's secrets and his opinions about former co-stars. Subsequently, the death of Pete Beale in an off-screen car crash was announced in December 1993. Co-star June Brown (who played Dot Cotton in the show) allegedly quit the show in protest following Dean's sacking in 1993, but returned in 1997. Brown and Dean attempted to set up a production company together, but it did not come to fruition.

Since leaving EastEnders, Dean's television credits have been few, although he has made guest appearances on Channel 4 sketch show Bo' Selecta!, Banzai and Little Britain. He appeared in the Five television show Harry and Cosh in 2002 and regularly appears in pantomimes. In 1993 he was due to tour in the play Entertaining Mr Sloane with Barbara Windsor but left during rehearsals and was replaced by John Challis. Dean appeared in pantomime in December 2015 as the evil Abanazar in Aladdin at Harpenden Public Halls.

In August 2018, Dean appeared in series 3 of the BBC programme The Real Marigold Hotel.

== Personal life ==
He has been married twice. His first marriage to Sylvia Jones (which ended after three years in 1969) produced one daughter, Leah. He met his second wife, Jean, when he was 29 and she was 15; she was babysitting for a mutual acquaintance. Dean is divorced and lives in Wood Green, North London.

Dean is a practising Buddhist. He was always seen drinking from a pewter tankard in EastEnders, because he does not drink beer and would drink only lemonade. He also races greyhounds.
