= William Boyde =

British actor

- Occupation: Actor
- Notable work: EastEnders

William Boyde is a British actor, best known for his work on the British soap opera EastEnders (1986–1989, 1992, 2017).

He was educated at Cheltenham College, where he appeared as an extra in the film If..., which was filmed at the school.

His EastEnders character, James Willmott-Brown, became one of the soap's most renowned villains after raping barmaid Kathy Beale (Gillian Taylforth) in 1988, and then terrorizing her in 1992. In September 2017, Boyde made an unannounced return to EastEnders and eventually departed on 28 December at the conclusion of his storyline - in which he was revealed as the boss of Max Branning (Jake Wood) in their vengeful plot to destroy the square.

Boyde has also appeared in Just William (1977), the BBC drama Secret Army (1978), Bergerac (1981), and the detective series Dempsey and Makepeace (1985). In 2001, Boyde played Tim the pub landlord in the Johnny Vaughan cult sitcom 'Orrible. In 2004, Boyde guest starred in the Doctor Who audio adventure The Harvest.

His theatre work includes Dr Watson in A Study in Scarlet, Jack Favell in Rebecca, and Charles Condomine in Blithe Spirit.

Boyde has also delivered numerous voice-overs for radio and television advertisements.
