= Julia Smith (producer) =

English television director and producer (1927–1997)

- Smith and Tony Holland, co-creators of EastEnders
- Born: Julia Cuthbert Smith; 26 May 1927; Maida Vale, London, England
- Died: 19 June 1997 (aged 70); Chelsea, London, England
- Occupations: Television producer and director
- Years active: 1962–1993
- Television: EastEnders; Eldorado
- Spouse: David Geary (m. 1962; div. 1966)

Julia Cuthbert Smith (26 May 1927 – 19 June 1997) was an English television director and producer. She is best known for being the co-creator (along with Tony Holland) of the BBC soap opera EastEnders, also working as a director on the show and as its first producer.

== Early life ==
Julia Cuthbert Smith was born on 26 May 1927 in Maida Vale, west London, to Edward Cuthbert Smith and his wife, Elfriede Frances Gritton Menges. The family's residence was in Bedford Park, a planned development in Chiswick. Smith's father was a vocalist, and became the senior professor of singing at the Royal College of Music. Other maternal family members have also had careers in the arts: Herbert Menges, her uncle, was a conductor and director of music at The Old Vic; Isolde Menges, her aunt, was a violinist, and Royal College of Music professor; and Chris Menges, her cousin, became an Oscar-winning cinematographer.

During the Second World War, Smith was evacuated to Wiltshire. She subsequently attended the Royal Academy of Dramatic Art.

== Career ==
Because Smith felt her face was too solemn to win many leading parts, she went into stage management, firstly at the Regent Theatre in Hayes, Middlesex, before working in repertory companies. Smith's work for the Royal Shakespeare Company in the 1950s would lead to her first contact with the BBC, with her being asked to transfer a theatrical production to television. Following a period working in the small screen, Smith returned to Stratford-upon-Avon, where the RSC was based.

Having been a production manager on serials such as Pride and Prejudice, she took a BBC director's training course. She directed episodes of Dr. Finlay's Casebook and Compact, her first foray into the soap opera format.

In 1962, Smith directed the series Suspense. She went on to direct popular BBC shows such as Z-Cars (in 1962) and Doctor Who (in 1966 and 1967), for which she directed the stories The Smugglers and The Underwater Menace. In 1967, she directed an adaptation of The Railway Children with Jenny Agutter that was successful enough for it to lead to the fondly remembered 1970 film in which Agutter reprised her role of Roberta.

While working on Z Cars, Smith had met Tony Holland, who was a script editor for the show. The two of them became an established producer/script-editor team, and went on to work for the BBC's long-running hospital drama Angels from 1979 to 1983. This was followed by The District Nurse, a series set in the coalfields of south Wales.

=== EastEnders ===
In 1983, the BBC contacted Smith and Holland to create a new popular bi-weekly serial drama. Two ideas were given to them, one about a caravan site, the other about a shopping arcade. Neither of them liked either of the ideas, and demanded to be able to create something about what they really knew about: in the words of Smith, "London - today!"

Together, they came up with the idea of a serial set in the East End of London in a Victorian square. When casting for the show, Smith had the guideline 'Only genuine Eastenders need apply'; it was this that gave her the idea for the name of the show, which would be called EastEnders after other names were rejected. Originally, the show was to be called Eastenders, but Jonathan Powell, then Head of Drama at the BBC who had commissioned the show, made the tentative suggestion that the second "e" didn't look good on paper, and said that perhaps it should be capitalized. It was, for which Smith later said "...we were eternally grateful to him!"

Traditionally, the end music to EastEnders begins with dramatic drums, but occasionally, especially when a character departs, a piano introduction is used. This is called "Julia's Theme", after Smith.

Her final contribution to EastEnders, along with that of fellow creator Tony Holland, came in early 1989, amid a dispute with BBC bosses as to whether the character of Den Watts (played by Leslie Grantham) could ever return to the show after being shot and supposedly killed. The character would ultimately return to the series, having apparently survived the shooting, but Smith would not live to see this happen.

=== Eldorado ===
Following the success of EastEnders, Smith and Holland collaborated again on the ill-fated BBC soap opera Eldorado. Holland created the series, based on an original idea by Verity Lambert, and Smith was producer. Eldorado was produced by Lambert through her own company, Cinema Verity Productions. The BBC had hoped that, after EastEnders, Smith and Holland could make drama gold again; however, the series was cancelled by the new controller of BBC1, Alan Yentob. Smith was blamed for the programme's shortcomings and fired, which left her bitter towards the BBC, who she believed had not given Eldorado a chance to establish itself.

Corinne Hollingworth took over as series producer after Smith left the show, but the series was ended after only a year. Following the demise of Eldorado, Smith effectively retired from television work, but remained active on the lecture circuit, giving talks on TV drama production.

== Personal life and death ==
On 2 April 1962, Smith married David Maxwell Geary, a radio announcer. However, the couple divorced in 1966. Smith owned the poodle dog who appeared in EastEnders as Roly.

Smith died of cancer at the Royal Marsden Hospital in Chelsea, London, on 19 June 1997, aged 70. Several stalwart cast members of EastEnders, including Wendy Richard, attended her funeral. Smith was cremated at Mortlake Crematorium on 30 June.

Media offices
New television show	Executive producer of EastEnders; 1985–88	Succeeded by Mike Gibbon
