= EastEnders spin-offs =

EastEnders is a long-running British soap opera that has aired on BBC One since 19 February 1985. Since its inception, several spin-offs have been produced, including books, television documentaries, videos, music singles and an album. During the run up to the first episode of EastEnders, interest with the public was already high, something which continued afterwards. EastEnders proved as successful as was hoped for by the BBC in its first years, so they capitalised on it with a number of products.

== Books ==
Many novels relating to EastEnders have been produced. Between 1985 and 1988, Hugh Miller wrote a series of 12 books focusing on several characters in the show. The books told the characters' backstories from before the show's inception in February 1985. Miller also wrote a series of four books called Teen EastEnders. Similar to the original 12 books, they focused on teenage characters in the show.

Four more novels were written by Kate Lock between 1998 and 2001. Two of these explored the backstories of the characters Grant Mitchell and Steve Owen, with the other two being "secret diaries" of characters Bianca Jackson and Tiffany Mitchell, giving an insight into the characters lives during storylines that were airing at the time.

Several non-fiction books have been produced, including EastEnders: The Inside Story in 1987, which was written by the show's creators, Tony Holland and Julia Smith.

=== Non-fiction books ===
Title	Author	Year	Publisher	ISBN
EastEnders Special (1987 Annual)	Barraclough, John	1986	Grandreams	ISBN 978-0-8622-7384-2
EastEnders: The Inside Story	Smith, Julia and Holland, Tony	1987	BBC Books	ISBN 978-0-563-20601-9
Public Secrets: EastEnders and its Audience	Buckingham, David	1987	BFI	ISBN 978-0-85170-210-0
Albert Square	Miller, Hugh and Harris, Keith	1987	David & Charles	ISBN 978-0-7153-9135-8
EastEnders Special (1988 Annual)	Barraclough, John	1987	Grandreams	ISBN 978-0-86227-482-5
EastEnders Special (1989 Annual)	Lynch, Tony and Bain, Morag	1988	Grandreams	ISBN 978-0-86227-626-3
How to Speak EastEnders : A Brief Glossary of Cockney Expressions		1988	Lionheart Television	ISBN 978-9-57022-032-2
The Colour Black: Black Images in British Television	Daniels, Therese and Gerson, Jane (eds.)	1989	BFI	ISBN 978-0-85170-232-2
The EastEnders Handbook	Kingsley, Hilary	1991	BBC Books	ISBN 978-0-563-36292-0
Gill and Mark Story	Dawson, Susanna	1993	Red Fox Books	ISBN 978-0-09931-841-5
The EastEnders Programme Guide	Monroe, Josephine	1994	Virgin Publishing	ISBN 978-0-86369-825-5
EastEnders: The First 10 Years: A Celebration (Note: An update version of this book was released 2 November 1995, in a paperback format, ISBN 978-014025-339-9.)	Brake, Colin	1994	BBC Books	ISBN 978-0-563-37057-4
EastEnders: Real Soap	Sinotok, Karen	1999	Generation Publications	ISBN 978-1-903009-04-8
Who's Who in EastEnders	Lock, Kate	2000	BBC Books	ISBN 978-0-563-55178-2
Essential "Eastenders" Scripts: Models for Writing (Student Book)	Gould, Mike	2003	Folens Publishers UK	ISBN 978-1-8430-3444-5
Essential "Eastenders" Scripts: Models for Writing (Teacher Book)	Midghall, Diane	2003	Folens Publishers UK	ISBN 978-1-8430-3445-2
EastEnders: 20 years in Albert Square	Smith, Rupert	2005	BBC Books	ISBN 978-0-563-52165-5
EastEnders Annual 2009	Randall, Tim	2008	BBC Books	ISBN 978-1-84607-555-1
Albert Square & Me: The Actors of EastEnders	Jaffee, Larry (ed.)	2009	iUniverse	ISBN 978-1-4401-5987-9
1001 Reasons Why Eastenders is Pony!	Bushell, Garry	2009	Pennant Books	ISBN 978-1-906015-40-4
Celebrating 25 Years of EastEnders	Mirror Series	2010	The Mirror	ISBN 978-0-95623-739-2
The Ultimate Unofficial EastEnders Quiz Book	Cobham, Ed	2010	Summersdale Publishers	ISBN 978-1-84953-098-9
Walford State of Mind: EastEnders as Reported by the Walford Gazette	Jaffee, Larry	2011	East End Company	ISBN 978-0-61542-920-5

=== Novels ===
Title	Author	Year	Publisher	Central character(s)	ISBN
EastEnders – Book One: Home Fires Burning	Miller, Hugh	1986	Inner Circle Books	Lou Beale	ISBN 978-1-85018-045-6
EastEnders – Book Two: Swings and Roundabouts	Miller, Hugh	1986	Inner Circle Books	Beale family	ISBN 978-1-85018-050-0
EastEnders – Book Three: Good Intentions	Miller, Hugh	1986	Inner Circle Books	Debbie Wilkins and Andy O'Brien	ISBN 978-1-85018-049-4
EastEnders – Book Four: The Flower of Albert Square	Miller, Hugh	1986	Inner Circle Books	Ethel Skinner	ISBN 978-1-85018-052-4
EastEnders – Book Five: Blind Spots	Miller, Hugh	1986	Inner Circle Books	Den and Angie Watts	ISBN 978-1-85018-059-3
EastEnders – Book Six: Hopes and Horizons	Miller, Hugh	1986	Inner Circle Books	Lofty Holloway	ISBN 978-1-85018-061-6
Teen EastEnders – Solid Ground	Miller, Hugh	1986	André Deutsch	Sharon Watts	ISBN 978-0-233-98123-9
Teen EastEnders – Growing Pains	Miller Hugh	1986	André Deutsch	Cassie Carpenter	ISBN 978-0-233-98124-6
EastEnders – Book Seven: The Baffled Heart	Miller, Hugh	1987	Inner Circle Books	Dot Cotton	ISBN 978-1-85018-068-5
EastEnders – Book Eight: Growing Wild	Miller, Hugh	1987	Inner Circle Books	Mary Smith	ISBN 978-1-85018-069-2
EastEnders – Book Nine: A Place in Life	Miller, Hugh	1987	Inner Circle Books	Lofty Holloway	ISBN 978-1-85018-076-0
EastEnders – Book Ten: A Single Man	Miller, Hugh	1987	Inner Circle Books	Colin Russell	ISBN 978-1-85018-077-7
EastEnders – Book Eleven: Taking Chances	Miller, Hugh	1987	Inner Circle Books	James Willmott-Brown	ISBN 978-0-586-07228-8
EastEnders – Book Twelve: Elbow Room	Miller, Hugh	1988	Inner Circle Books	Simon Wicks	ISBN 978-1-85018-081-4
Teen EastEnders – Heroes	Miller, Hugh	1988	Lions	Simon Wicks	ISBN 978-0-00-693235-2
Teen EastEnders – An Eye for Business	Miller, Hugh	1988	Lions	Barry Clark	ISBN 978-0-00-693236-9
EastEnders – Blood Ties: The Life and Loves of Grant Mitchell	Lock, Kate	1998	BBC Books	Grant Mitchell	ISBN 978-0-563-38483-0
EastEnders – Tiffany's Secret Diary	Lock, Kate	1998	BBC Books	Tiffany Mitchell	ISBN 978-0-563-55104-1
EastEnders – Bianca's Secret Diary	Lock, Kate	1999	BBC Books	Bianca Jackson	ISBN 978-0-563-55162-1
EastEnders – Steve Owen: Still Waters	Lock, Kate	2001	BBC Books	Steve Owen	ISBN 978-0-563-53722-9

== Television ==
Several EastEnders spin-off episodes have been produced, which look at the history of some of the characters using flashbacks. They are also often used as a lead up for a character's return to the show or follow characters who have departed from the show in another setting outside the usual location of Albert Square. The first of these was CivvyStreet, which aired in December 1988. It was set in Albert Square during World War II and featured younger versions of some of the soap's characters. Other episodes include Dot's Story, Perfectly Frank, Ricky & Bianca, Pat and Mo, and Return of Nick Cotton.

Documentaries have also been produced, particularly for the 10th, 15th and 20th anniversaries of the show looking back since show's inception, its characters and storylines. A behind-the-scenes documentary, EastEnders Revealed, aired regularly on BBC Choice and continued on BBC Three after the closure of BBC Choice. The first episode was in October 1999 and the show continued regularly until October 2005, with a few episodes still being made after this. A series of documentary shows, similar to EastEnders Revealed, aired from 2006. EastEnders Xtra was an interactive series available between February and May 2005 via BBCi.

The soap has also produced a number of charity specials for Children in Need. Some notable episodes include: Dimensions in Time, a crossover with the science fiction series Doctor Who; "Pudding Lane", which relocates the characters to 1666 during the Great Fire of London; and "East Street", a crossover with the ITV soap Coronation Street). The charity specials are not considered canon.

On 4 April 2015, EastEnders bosses announced plans of a new six-part BBC drama series featuring iconic couple Kat (Jessie Wallace) and Alfie Moon (Shane Richie). The series, Redwater, follows the characters as they move to Ireland. Speaking at the time, executive producer Dominic Treadwell-Collins commented: "In the next few weeks on EastEnders, viewers will witness several huge twists for Kat and Alfie Moon that will change their lives forever. Now is the perfect time to take two of EastEnders' most beloved and enduring characters out of their comfort zone as they head to Ireland to search for answers to some very big questions... My team here are very excited about creating a whole new drama that stands apart from EastEnders while taking our style of storytelling to a place of stories, myth, secrets and immeasurable beauty."

== Internet and BBC Red Button ==
EastEnders' official website is located on the BBC Programmes website at www.bbc.co.uk/programmes/b006m86d and is part of BBC Online, the official website of the BBC. It was previously located at www.bbc.co.uk/eastenders. The website formerly contained information on the cast and characters, games, news and interviews but only the character information and interviews are now available, but are no longer updated and are in the "archive" section of the site. The website was redesigned in 2007, with the new version going live on 20 April 2007. Another updated website went live in December 2009, to tie in with the show's 25th anniversary in February 2010. The site contained new features and was based on feedback from users of the website. Occasionally, a character in the show sets up their own website and these are sometimes created in reality, such as godlypodly.co.uk.

In October 2009, a spin-off series entitled EastEnders: E20 was announced. Conceived by executive producer Diederick Santer, it was developed "as a way of nurturing new, young talent, both on- and off-screen, and exploring the stories of the soaps' anonymous bystanders." EastEnders: E20's characters are a group of sixth form students and it targets the "Hollyoaks demographic". It was written by a team of young writers and was shown on the EastEnders website in January 2010. A second series was commissioned for later in 2010, and a third series for 2011.

An internet mini-series, Lauren's Diaries, began in 2010, featuring Lauren Branning (Jacqueline Jossa) and giving an insight into her thoughts and feelings. A second series started in April 2011. The episodes feature on the EastEnders website. Another mini-series on the internet, called The B&B, started in 2012. The four-episode spin-off takes on the style of a fly-on-the-wall documentary, featuring Kim Fox (Tameka Empson), working at her bed and breakfast. Tamwar Tales – The Life of an Assistant Market Inspector is a four-episode spin-off starting in 2013, featuring the character of Tamwar Masood (Himesh Patel). Various other mini-episodes have appeared online and on the Red Button, showing extra scenes. These have included the two-part "Amira's Secret" from 2011, 2012's "Phil on Remand" and "Billy's Olympic Nightmare". Poppy Meadow (Rachel Bright) and Fatboy (Ricky Norwood) were also at the centre of a Red Button episode, showing how they spent their Christmas together, entitled "All I Want for Christmas".

EastEnders' first audio drama, EastEnders: The Podcast, started on 28 November 2018, consisting of four episodes.

On 17 May 2024, BBC released a six-part spin-off miniseries titled The Point of Mo Return via TikTok, Facebook, Instagram and X, starring Laila Morse as Mo Harris and Bobby Brazier as Freddie Slater ahead of their permanent return to EastEnders. The miniseries sees Mo and Freddie living away from Walford in Mo's caravan, and focuses on their relationship and Freddie's ADHD diagnosis.

== Videos and DVDs ==
The first EastEnders video, released on 22 September 1986, was EastEnders – The Queen Vic, which looked at the major events in the lives of Angie Watts, Den Watts, Jan Hammond and Michelle Fowler, such as the birth of Michelle's baby, Vicki. The next video EastEnders – The Den and Angie Years, released in 1994. It included all of Den and Angie's moments such as their second honeymoon. In 1998, EastEnders – The Mitchells – Naked Truths was released, which was put together by writers such as Simon Ashdown, Tony Jordan and Christopher Reason. This video looked back at some of the most memorable storylines of Phil, Grant and Peggy Mitchell. This was essentially a two-hander between Phil and Grant, set in The Queen Victoria public house, intercut with flashbacks.

A 40-minute VHS was released in 1993, titled The Gill and Mark Story. The VHS was only available to education institutions and followed the story of Gill and Mark's HIV storyline.

To celebrate 15 years of EastEnders, a special video, 15 Years of EastEnders, was released. The video included some of the highlights of the show, including Den serving Angie with divorce papers, Grant discovering his wife Sharon and his brother Phil's affair, Tiffany Mitchell's death and funeral, and Carol Jackson confronting her daughter Bianca over her relationship with Dan Sullivan.

The first EastEnders DVD was Slaters in Detention, released in November 2003 and also available on VHS. It contained a special comedic episode of EastEnders starring the Slater family. It was written by Tony Jordan, who helped devise the characters. It began with the female members of the Slater family dressed up in school uniform for a local disco, and they end up in a police cell where they reflect on the events of their lives, such as Kat revealing that Zoe was her daughter and Little Mo's marriage to Trevor Morgan. It also includes outtakes and an alternative ending to Little Mo's trial.

An interactive DVD game was released in October 2005, titled An A-Z Tour of Albert Square, exclusively available through BBC's Reading and Writing (RaW) campaign on BBC Online. The DVD is hosted by Adam Woodyatt as he challenges viewers to answer questions to unlock classic clips from the show's history.

A DVD titled EastEnders: Last Tango in Walford was released on 8 February 2010 to coincide with the show's 25th anniversary. It focuses on the characters Tiffany Dean (Maisie Smith) and Liam Butcher (James Forde) in the run up to their mother Bianca Jackson's (Patsy Palmer) wedding to their father Ricky Butcher (Sid Owen). Cast interviews and archive footage also feature.

A DVD, The Best of EastEnders, was released in November 2018, featuring some of the show's most iconic moments from the last 33 years.

== Music releases ==
The EastEnders theme tune was released on record in 1986 featuring the orchestra of the themes creator, Simon May. The tune was later turned into a song, titled "Anyone Can Fall in Love". The lyrics were created by Don Black, and it was recorded in 1986 by EastEnders star Anita Dobson, known as Angie Watts in the show. It reached number four in the UK Singles Chart, and Dobson appeared on shows such as Top Of The Pops and Wogan, to promote the song.

A one-off album titled The EastEnders' Sing-A-Long Album was released in 1986 on BBC Records. It featured most of the original cast and was an album of medleys containing well known cockney knees-up songs such as "Knees Up Mother Brown" and "Roll Out the Barrel". The record is notable for containing a Doctor Legg solo effort, performed by the actor who portrayed the character, Leonard Fenton. The album reached number 54 in the UK Albums Chart.

Two songs from the show were released as singles. "Every Loser Wins" by Nick Berry (Simon Wicks) reached number one in the UK Singles Chart. "Something Outa Nothing" by Letitia Dean (Sharon Watts) and Paul Medford (Kelvin Carpenter) reached number 12. Both songs were featured in a storyline where the characters formed a band called The Banned.

In 1999, BBC Music in association with Telstar released a single with performances by Barbara Windsor (Peggy Mitchell) and Mike Reid (Frank Butcher). They came together to release the song "The More I See You", based on their characters' wedding.

A version of the theme tune, called "Peggy's Theme", features on the album The Simon May Collection and was also released as an EP along with other EastEnders songs including "Anyone Can Fall in Love".

== Other merchandise ==
One of the first products was a BBC EastEnders Knitting Collection pattern book which was released exclusively to high street store Woolworths in 1986. It contains many of EastEnders' characters at the time wearing the patterns shown in the book.

In 1988, a board game titled EastEnders the Game was released based on the characters and setting of the show. This game has since been reproduced. Since then there have also been items such as an EastEnders fridge magnet featuring The Queen Victoria pub and a hand-painted ceramic teapot based on The Queen Victoria, which was designed by Anne Rowe.

EastEnders the Arcade Game was published by Macsen Software in 1987 for the ZX Spectrum 48K. The game received negative reviews. Sinclair User magazine called it "The naffest game release from a 'major' software house for two years", and Crash magazine readers voted it the worst game of 1987. Macsen attempted to disown the game and entered liquidation soon after its release. In the Xleague TV series, Wez and Larry's Top Tens, it was voted the third worst video game based on a TV license of all-time.

In November 2006, a wall calendar for 2007 was released, featuring pictures of the cast dressed as characters from William Shakespeare's plays, in aid of Children in Need. A range of EastEnders T-shirts were released through Topshop in 2010.

In 2014, a wall calendar was commissioned to be sold in aid of Children in Need, which shows some of the cast semi-nude to link in with a storyline in the show itself.
