= Something Outa Nothing =

Single by Letitia Dean and Paul Medford
- A-side: "Something Outa Nothing"
- B-side: "Time Square" (instrumental)
- Released: October 1986
- Recorded: 1986
- Length: 3:25 (7"); 5:34 (Extended 12")
- Label: BBC Records
- Songwriters: Simon May, Stewart and Bradley James
- Producers: Simon May, Stewart and Bradley James

"Something Outa Nothing" is a song written by Simon May, Stewart James and Bradley James, for the BBC soap opera EastEnders. It featured in an EastEnders storyline in 1986 and was recorded by actors Letitia Dean and Paul J. Medford. It was released as a single in 1986 reaching number 12 in the UK singles chart.

== The song in EastEnders ==
In 1986, Dean and Medford's characters, Sharon Watts and Kelvin Carpenter, are members of a band called The Banned, along with Simon Wicks (Nick Berry), Eddie Hunter (Simon Henderson), Ian Beale (Adam Woodyatt) and Harry Reynolds (Gareth Potter). They enter a competition for young musicians, and both Harry and Simon vow to outdo each other by writing the best song to perform. Harry does not complete his song, but Simon writes "Something Outa Nothing". He first recites the lyrics in episode 162, starts to sing it in the next episode and gradually puts the song together throughout a number of episodes, and the band start to rehearse and learn it. However, Simon leaves the band following a disagreement with Harry and writes "Every Loser Wins". "Something Outa Nothing" is first heard in full in episode 175 during The Banned's final rehearsal. They perform "Something Outa Nothing" for the competition but Harry sabotages the performance and the band are booed off stage.

The song is played in the episode first broadcast on 24 August 2010 when Ian finds a cassette tape and plays it to his family. Occasionally, Ian and Sharon will reference the song whilst reminiscing about their teenage years.

== Track listing ==
7": BBC Records / RESL 203

1. "Something Outa Nothing" [3:25]
2. "Time Square" (Instrumental) [4:10]

12": BBC Records / 12RSL 203

1. "Something Outa Nothing" (Extended Version) [5:34]
2. "Time Square" (Instrumental) [4:10]

== Charts ==
Chart performance for "Something Outa Nothing"
Chart (1986)	Peak position
Luxembourg (Radio Luxembourg)	3
UK Singles Chart (OCC)	12
