= Sound Effects No. 13 – Death & Horror =

Studio album
- Released: 1977
- Genre: Sound effects
- Length: 39:37
- Label: BBC Records & Tapes
- Producer: Mike Harding

BBC Sound Effects chronology
Out of This World (1976)	Sound Effects No. 13 – Death & Horror (1977)	Sound Effects No. 16 – Disasters (1977)

Sound Effects No. 13 – Death & Horror is an album produced by Mike Harding of the BBC Radiophonic Workshop and released in 1977 by BBC Records & Tapes. It is the thirteenth instalment in the label's Sound Effects series and contains over 80 sound effects related to horror and death, so that producers may use them in amateur film and stage productions. Mike Harding and label staff man Ian Richardson picked numerous "classics" from the BBC Effects Library and from the BBC Radiophonic Workshop, but also created many new sound effects for the album themselves, many of which were created by "mistreating large white cabbages." The effects are arranged throughout the album into six distinct themed sections.

Upon release, the album drew controversy regarding its violent content, especially from anti-obscenity campaigner Mary Whitehouse, who criticised what she felt was an "utter lack of responsibility" on behalf of the BBC. While this meant the album was briefly pulled from sale, it soon returned to stock, and the controversy encouraged it to sell some 20,000 extra copies, making it the first sound effects album to chart within the Top 100 of the UK Albums Chart. The album has been described as one of BBC Records' most memorable releases and writers have described its sounds as sounding authentic. It was re-released as a "blood-splattered" vinyl LP by Demon Records in 2016. Two sequels to the album had also been released in 1978 and 1981.

== Background and production ==
Sound Effects No. 13 – Death & Horror is the thirteenth release in BBC Records & Tapes LP series Sound Effects, which brought together numerous sound effects for amateur drama and film producers to use in their productions. The series had begun with the first edition in 1969, and the most recent edition prior to Death & Horror was 1976's Out of this World, which contained atmospheric sound effects recorded by members of the BBC Radiophonic Workshop. Over the run of the series, the makers received numerous requests for eerie and horrific sound effects for usage in stage thrillers, which led to the Death & Horror edition being commissioned by BBC staff man Ian Richardson, who decided which effects would be used on the album. His liner notes for the album enforced that the usage of sound effects in horror productions is crucial to create an eerie atmosphere:

"A recording of horror sound effects? Who needs sound effects for executions and gory things like that? It's surely the visual aspect of any horror film which sends tingles down your back and makes your hair stand on end. Not true. Next time you stay up to watch the late night film on the T.V., turn the sound down and you'll find that not only does the speech disappear but also those all-important sound effects. So spare a thought for the men who make them. They deafen themselves banging tin sheets making thunder, soak themselves with water for a Chinese water torture effect and tramp up and down gravel pits for hours providing necessary creepy footsteps."

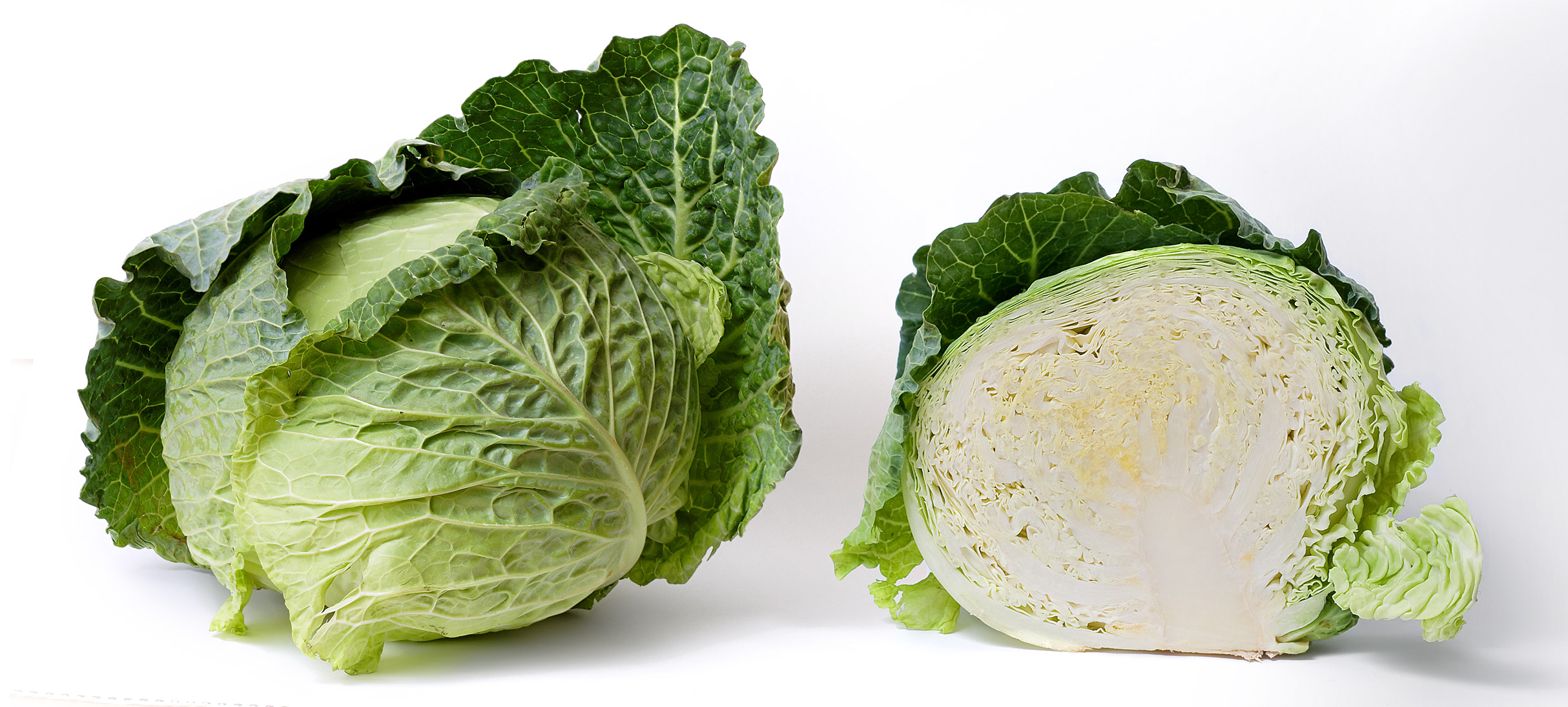
Many sound effects were created by "mistreating large white cabbages."

Of the sounds on the album, Richardson worked with producer Mike Harding of the BBC Radiophonic Workshop in gathering many "classic" gruesome sound effects, many of which came from the BBC Effects Library and the Radiophonic Workshop, but most sounds were recorded by the pair especially for the album. They recorded most of the grisly effects, such as the chopping of heads and breaking necks, by "mistreating" large white cabbages, which they cut with knives and cleavers and stabbed with pokers. Richarsdon wrote that "[t]he results were highly realistic and we even had some coleslaw left for dinner." The gullotine sound effect was achieved by sliding a metal bar down a coat rack and editing this to the sound of a cabbage being chopped into a basket containing straw.

There are over 80 sound effects on the album, which is ordered into six sections: "Execution and Torture", "Monsters and Animals", "Creaking Doors and Grave Digging", "Musical Effects and Footsteps", "Vocal Effects and Heartbeats" and "Weather, Atmosphere and Bells." Sound effects on the album noted in commentaries for their violence include "Neck Twisted and Broken", "Red Hot Poker in the Eye" and "Strangulation". Most of the effects were recorded in mono, and while stereo echo was applied to some of them to enhance the effect, the liner notes instruct users to add their own stereo to the mono sounds to suit varied requirements, as well as suggesting that users dub sounds they find too short onto tape and edit the sounds to achieve a continuous effect. The cover illustration was designed by Andrew Prewett.

== Release and controversy ==
"It is important to remember that this is the latest in a series of sound-effects albums we are putting out for a specific market of amateur dramatics and home movie people. It is not just something put out for a laugh. We had many requests for eerie and horrific effects for stage thrillers."

—Roy Tempest, explaining the album's purpose during the controversy.

Sound Effects No. 13 – Death & Horror was released by BBC Records and Tapes in spring 1977 as a black LP which turned translucent blood red in colour when held up to a strong light. Some of the selections from the album were also released as one side of a hi-fi test single. Upon the album's release, it was condemned by moral guardians for its violent content. In particular, noted anti-obscenity campaigner Mary Whitehouse complained about the album, announcing she was horrified at the BBC's "utter lack of responsibility" by deciding to release it. Alan Bilyard, who at the time was in charge of BBC Records' business affairs and finance, noted that the controversy "shook us a bit to start with." The controversy meant the album was suspended for a short time, until Bilyard got approval to put the album back on the market.

Roy Tempest, managing director of BBC Records, was pleased with Whitehouse's dissenting comments as he suspected they would help boost sales of the album. Indeed, sales figures for the album quickly rose after her comments. Bilyard suspected that her intervention helped sell some 20,000 copies of the album, while Billboard wrote that the album was selling almost 100,000 copies a week, and became the first sound effects album to enter the Top 100 of the UK Albums Chart. Tempest said in 1977 that if sales of the album continued to be impressive, it could become the best-selling sound effects album of all time in the UK, overtaking an album containing the sounds of trains, whistles, the rain and wind. Accusations that the BBC were wasting public money with the album were erroneous, with Tempest pointing out the label was a self-supporting profitable area which used its own money.

== Legacy and re-releases ==
Amar Ediriwira of The Vinyl Factory called the album one of the most memorable releases by BBC Records and felt Harding captured the themes of death and horror "brilliantly." He further compared the album to the 2012 horror film Berberian Sound Studio, due to its themes of torture being used to capture foley. Billboard felt the sounds were "highly evocative," while Alex Marshall of the BBC felt that the contrast between an album of horror sound effects and "keep-fit music for new mothers" also released by BBC Records helped make the label stand out as "the world's weirdest record label." Brian Cullman of Spin joked that the only issue with the album, and indeed its 1978 sequel, is that "it's tough to enjoy them in the privacy of your own home. If it's up too loud, your neighbour is going to call 911. If it's too low, it sounds like Leatherface is in your closet." They felt that "[t]herein lies the beauty and profound existential existential aesthetic dilemma of sound effects records," due to their authentic emulation of sounds tricking the human mind into believing their presence.

Due to the success of the album, a sequel entitled More Death and Horror was released as the 21st edition of the Sound Effects series in 1978, and a further edition entitled Even More Death and Horror was released as the series' 27th edition in 1981. The first of these sequels was notably different in that sound effects were stitched together to form montages. The original Death & Horror album was licensed to Total Records in Canada in 1977 and Diapason in Spain in 1982. In October 2016, it was reissued by Demon Records as a 180g "blood-splattered" vinyl LP.

== Track listing ==
=== Side one, band one ===
1. "Execution and Torture" (contains 20 sound effects) – 3:34

=== Side one, band two ===
2. "Monsters and Animals" (contains 13 sound effects) – 7:25

=== Side one, band three ===
3. "Creaking Doors and Grave Digging" (contains 12 sound effects) – 3:36

=== Side one, band four ===
4. "Musical Effects and Footsteps" (contains 12 sound effects) – 5:09

=== Side two, band one ===
5. "Vocal Effects and Heartbeats" (contains 19 sound effects) – 5:03

=== Side two, band two ===
6. "Weather, Atmosphere and Bells" (contains 21 sound effects) – 14:50

== Personnel ==
Adapted from the liner notes of Sound Effects No. 13 – Death & Horror

- Mike Harding – producer
- Ian Richardson – liner notes
- Andrew Prewett – sleeve design illustration
