= BBC Records =

Internal label used for BBC releases

- Founded: 1967
- Defunct: 26 July 1995
- Successor: BBC Worldwide; BBC Studios
- Parent: BBC

BBC Records was a division of the BBC founded in 1967 to commercially exploit the corporation's output for radio and television for both educational and domestic use. The division was known as BBC Radio Enterprises (1967–1970), BBC Records (1970–1972) and BBC Records & Tapes (1972–1989).

Throughout the 1970s and 1980s, BBC Records released a wide range of recordings, primarily but not exclusively as tie-ins to the BBC's television and radio output. Some of these recordings entered the UK record charts (see below). Other ventures included a long-running series of sound effects recordings as well as original material from the BBC Radiophonic Workshop, and classical recordings from the BBC Archives. To celebrate both the corporation's 60th and 70th anniversaries, compilation recordings were issued of key moments in the BBC's history.

In the mid-1990s, licensing and marketing of the BBC's recorded output became the responsibility of BBC Worldwide (formerly BBC Enterprises), and the corporation ceased the direct release of recorded material, instead licensing its products to other companies. BBC Worldwide was merged into BBC Studios in 2018, which now licenses the use of the BBC logo on commercial recordings.

== Chart singles ==
=== As BBC Records ===
- 1977 (Theme for) Who Pays the Ferryman? - Yannis Markopoulos (No.11)
- 1977 (Theme for) The Water Margin" - Godiego (No.37)
- 1978 "Theme from The Hong Kong Beat" - Richard Denton and Martin Cook (No.25)
- 1978 "The Last Farewell" - Ship's Company and Royal Marine Band of HMS Ark Royal (No.46)
- 1979 "Gandhara" - Godiego (No.56)
- 1981 "Chi Mai" (theme for The Life and Times of David Lloyd George) - Ennio Morricone (No.2)
- 1981 "Heaven and Hell" - Vangelis (No.48)
- 1981 "I Wanna Be a Winner" - Brown Sauce (No.15)
- 1982 "Tara's Theme from Gone with the Wind" - Rose of Romance Orchestra (No.71)
- 1982 "BBC World Cup Grandstand" - Royal Philharmonic Orchestra (No.61)
- 1982 "Orville's Song" - Keith Harris and Orville (No.4)
- 1983 "Come to My Party" - Keith Harris, Orville and Dippy (No.44)
- 1984 (Theme for) Big Deal - Bobby G (No.46)
- 1985 "Smuggler's Blues" - Glenn Frey (No.22)
- 1985 (Theme for) Howard's Way - Simon May Orchestra (No.21)
- 1985 "Memory - Theme from the Musical" - Aled Jones (No.42)
- 1985 (Theme for) Edge of Darkness - Eric Clapton and Michael Kamen (No.65)
- 1986 "Just Say No" - Grange Hill Cast (No.5)
- 1986 "Heroes" - The County Line (No.76)
- 1986 "Aztec Lightning" - Heads (No.45)
- 1986 "Anyone Can Fall in Love" - Anita Dobson (No.4)
- 1986 "It's 'Orrible Being in Love (When You're 8½)" - Claire and Friends (No.13)
- 1986 "Always There" - Marti Webb (No.13)
- 1986 "Something Outa Nothing" - Letitia Dean and Paul Medford (No.12)
- 1986 "Every Loser Wins" - Nick Berry (No.1)
- 1987 "Sing for Ever" - St Philips Choir (No.47)

=== As an imprint of BBC Worldwide ===
- 1997 "Teletubbies Say Eh-Oh!" - Teletubbies (No.1)
- 1998 "Everlasting Love" - Cast of Casualty (No.5)
- 1999 "Sunburn" - Michelle Collins (No.28)
- 2000 "Stay with Me (Baby)" - Rebecca Wheatley (No.10)
- 2000 "No. 1" - Tweenies (No.5)
- 2000 "Can We Fix It?" - Bob the Builder (No.1)
- 2001 "Best Friends Forever" - Tweenies (No.12)
- 2001 "Do the Lollipop" - Tweenies (No.17)
- 2001 "Mambo No.5" - Bob the Builder (No.1)
- 2001 "I Believe in Christmas" - Tweenies (No.9)
- 2002 "Have Fun Go Mad" - Tweenies (No.20)
- 2002 "It's a Rainbow" - Rainbow (No.15)

== Chart albums ==
- 1972 The Last Goon Show of All - The Goons (No.8)
- 1979 Fawlty Towers - Cast/soundtrack (No.25)
- 1980 Not the Nine O'Clock News - Cast/soundtrack (No.5)
- 1981 Fawlty Towers Vol.2 - Cast/soundtrack (No.26)
- 1981 The Official Album of the Royal Wedding - Various (No.1)
- 1981 Hedgehog Sandwich - Cast/soundtrack (No.5)
- 1982 The Kids from "Fame" - Cast/soundtrack (No.1)
- 1982 The Memory Kinda Lingers - Not the Nine O'Clock News cast/soundtrack (No.63)
- 1983 Live - The Kids from "Fame" (No.8)
- 1983 Sing for You - The Kids from "Fame" (No.25)
- 1985 Voices from the Holy Land - Aled Jones (No.6)
- 1985 All Through the Night - Aled Jones (No.2)
- 1987 Enya - Enya (No.69)
- 1989 Atlantic Realm - Clannad (No.41)
- 1992 The Evil of the Daleks - Doctor Who soundtrack (No.72)
- 1993 The Power of the Daleks - Doctor Who soundtrack (No.71)
- 1993 The Paradise of Death - Doctor Who soundtrack (No.48)
- 1995 Knowing Me Knowing You 3 - Alan Partridge (No.41)

== See also ==
- List of companies based in London
