= Den Watts =

Fictional character from EastEnders

- EastEnders character
- Portrayed by: Leslie Grantham
- Duration: 1985–1989, 2003–2005
- First appearance: Episode 1 "Poor Old Reg"; 19 February 1985
- Last appearance: Episode 2892; 18 February 2005
- Created by: Tony Holland
- Introduced by: Julia Smith (1985); Louise Berridge (2003)
- Book appearances: Blind Spots; Swings and Roundabouts
- Crossover appearances: Doctor Who (2006)
In-universe information
- Other names: Dennis Alan Watts; Dirty Den
- Occupation: Barman; Businessman; Pub landlord Career criminal Bar manager Nightclub owner
- Family: Watts
- Father: Dennis Watts
- Wife: Angie Shaw (until 1987); Chrissie Watts (1999–2005)
- Sons: Dennis Rickman
- Daughters: Vicki Fowler
- Adoptive daughters: Sharon Watts
- Grandsons: Dennis Rickman Jnr; Albie Watts (adoptive)
- Other relatives: Alyssa Lennox

Den Watts is a fictional character from the BBC soap opera EastEnders, played by actor Leslie Grantham. He became well known for his tabloid nickname, "Dirty Den". Den was the original landlord of The Queen Victoria public house from Albert Square who first appeared when the show debuted on 19 February 1985. From then onwards, the character had a turbulent marriage with his alcoholic first wife Angie (Anita Dobson).

In 1986, Den discovers that Angie lied to him about having six months to live and got revenge by giving her divorce papers on Christmas Day 1986, which was watched by over 30 million viewers. Den continued his close relationship with their adopted daughter Sharon (Letitia Dean). Den soon became involved in storylines that mostly contributed to the character's magnanimous and "bad boy" persona, such as Den impregnating 16-year-old Michelle Fowler (Susan Tully) – which resulted in a long-standing feud with Michelle's mother Pauline Fowler (Wendy Richard); teaming up with Pete Beale (Peter Dean) to force their enemy Nick Cotton (John Altman) out of Walford for causing trouble around the square; romancing with his mistress Jan Hammond (Jane How); and getting revenge on business rival James Willmott-Brown (William Boyde) for raping Pete's wife Kathy (Gillian Taylforth). Grantham quit the series in 1988, and in February 1989, Den was apparently killed off after getting shot due to his involvement with The Firm.

Despite turning down several offers to return, Grantham reprised the role 14 years later in a highly publicised week in September 2003, where Sharon discovered that Den had survived his shooting and had fled to Spain afterwards. The development of Den's return to the show was contributed with the introductions of his and Michelle's daughter Vicki (Scarlett Alice Johnson) and his biological son Dennis Rickman (Nigel Harman), and later Den's second wife Chrissie (Tracy-Ann Oberman). His second stint on the programme saw Den repeatedly clash with Dennis over his romantic feelings for Sharon, and he later has sex with Dennis' girlfriend Zoe Slater (Michelle Ryan) and gets her to lie that she is pregnant. Additionally, Den establishes a rivalry with Sharon's ex-boyfriend Phil Mitchell (Steve McFadden) that ends with him framing the latter for armed robbery; forms a friendship with Dot Cotton (June Brown); has sex with Phil's ex-wife Kate Morton (Jill Halfpenny) and his sister Sam (Kim Medcalf) as revenge; and cons Sam into relinquishing her ownership of The Queen Vic back to him. Grantham left in 2004, and Den was ultimately killed off for good on 18 February 2005, during the show's 20th anniversary episode, when he was bludgeoned to death by Chrissie, which was watched by 14.34 million viewers.

== Character creation ==
=== Background ===
Den Watts was one of the original 23 characters devised by the creators of EastEnders, Tony Holland and Julia Smith. The character of Den was originally going to be called Jack and he, his wife and adopted teenage daughter were to be the occupants of the soap's local pub, now famously known as The Queen Vic. Holland, who had worked as a barman in his youth, called upon his own personal experiences to invent the Watts family and the pub they lived in. Holland and Smith had always been critical of the way pubs had been portrayed on television feeling they lacked vitality and life, so they were determined that their pub and occupants were going to be more realistic. The Watts family were seen by Holland as integral to the show's success, partly because he had already guessed that the pub was going to be a monstrous battleground where emotions would run high on a regular basis, and also because the occupants would be providing the majority of the drama.

Den's original character outline as written by Smith and Holland appeared in an abridged form in their book, EastEnders: The Inside Story. In this passage, Den will be referred to as Jack, his wife as Pearl, his daughter as Tracey and his dog as Prince (known now as Angie, Sharon and Roly respectively).

"Jack and Pearl are not criminals. They're not angels either. Villains perhaps? Well, he certainly is. They've been married for fifteen years, and haven't had sex with each other for thirteen of them. The marriage is a front for the sake of the pub's image. The daughter, Tracey is adopted—maybe for the same reason. They have a dog too—Prince—an Alsatian...Even with a marriage on the rocks, Jack still likes the area. His mates are here, it's friendly and it's his territory. "Local lad makes good"...People look up to him. If you've dragged yourself up by the scruff of the neck and moved up a notch, you need a few people around you who didn't quite make it, or you might as well be invisible. He's had a mistress for five years...Unlike Pearl, she's a very up-market woman, a lady, real class. Jack's her bit of rough, and they're happy. They actually talk. With Pearl, you shout – or shut up...He's a smart dresser. Changes his shirt twice a day and his shoes sparkle. He runs a good pub. He's firm and fair with the staff (if you've got any problems—go to him, not her.) The cellars are well organised and spotless. His masculinity is the key to his character. It was called into question at an early stage in his marriage and he's defended it ever since. Some call him a ladies' man (because of his good looks) others – a man's man...He's a con man and has the gift of the gab. He can defend himself smartly in a brawl. (He's only ever thumped Pearly once.) You can accept Jack being a snob—because it's not malicious: it's done with a grin. Like Pearl, he's also trapped by is background...Jack and Pearl's relationship is pretty heated...The smooth public face (workers in pubs are always on stage); the trial reconciliations; the rows; the fights and the tears...Will Jack ever bring his mistress into the pub, which is Pearl's territory? Will Pearl accept too many free drinks from punters and lose control in public?...They were lovers. They are husband and wife. There was affection...love...if it came to it, could they give each other up? The private grins and winks to each other when they're working as a team—which usually means taking money. The love turning to hatred...Jack the lad and the artificial Pearl...They're an electric couple." (page 74).

=== Casting controversy ===
EastEnders' lead director Matthew Robinson recommended the actor Leslie Grantham for the part. Grantham had previously appeared in London's fringe theatre in a stage play Robinson had written and had played a small part, Kiston, in the two-part Doctor Who serial Resurrection of the Daleks (1984), which had been directed by Robinson. Julia Smith remembered that she had taught Grantham at the Webber Douglas Academy of Dramatic Art and regarded him as a "mature student", although she had never seen him "in action". Smith and Holland needed the character of Den to have "panache, charisma and electricity". They were initially uncertain about casting Grantham, but they both felt that the actor had "something", which they went on to describe as a "tensed up internal emotion of some sort, that was being held in. There was something behind the eyes, too. Barely contained violence almost..."

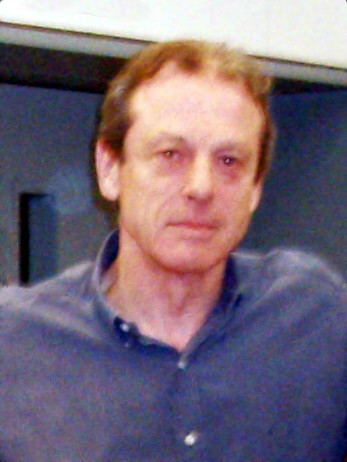
Leslie Grantham's (pictured) casting was deemed controversial after the actor's past of killing a taxi driver while on army service was revealed.

Following a successful reading with the actress Jean Fennell (who was originally cast as Angie), he was offered the part. However, shortly afterwards Grantham contacted Smith and asked to speak to her urgently. He revealed that he had been found guilty of killing a German taxi driver while on army service in 1966 and spent ten years in prison. Although there were fears that if this story got out the resultant publicity would do enormous damage to the programme and the BBC, Smith decided not to withdraw Grantham from the role. In her opinion, he had paid the full penalty that society requires for a mistake committed in his past and it was a "Christian duty to forgive".

The story found its way into the British press much faster than expected. Three days after the transmission of episode one, EastEnders made the front page of a national newspaper for the first time with the headline "EASTENDERS STAR IS A KILLER." The security gates at the BBC Elstree Centre (where EastEnders is filmed) were swamped with journalists and photographers, and so began a "double-edged" relationship between EastEnders and the popular press. The devisers of the programme were quick to realise that whilst a newspaper's publicity may sometimes boost a soap's position in the ratings, it could equally help to tarnish it. In conjunction, soaps could help to sell newspapers, and from then on stories about EastEnders and the cast began to fill their pages. Grantham was hounded by the press and the BBC was forced to put out a statement supporting him and their decision to employ a convicted murderer. To keep the press at bay, Grantham was smuggled out of the studios by the rear entrance and decoy cars were used to lure the press away from his home, all of which put an increasing strain on him. Eventually the furore quietened down, but it never went away entirely and nearly every article written about Grantham during his first stint in the show referenced his past. The press began to blur the characters in the show with the actors and it was at this point that Smith, in an attempt to dispel confusion about reality and fiction, introduced the rule that no actor was ever to appear in public "in character".

== Character development and impact ==
Despite the controversy surrounding Grantham, the Wattses, with Anita Dobson as the newly appointed Angie, were the surprise hit characters of the show. Angie and Den were a livewire couple whose on/off relationship made the Queen Vic pub "exciting and unpredictable" and the viewers tuned in their millions to watch the destruction of their relationship on-screen. Den's clashes with Angie brought EastEnders to a peak of popularity and removed rival soap Coronation Street from the top of the ratings chart.

=== "Dirty Den" ===
In 1985, Den was the first person to speak on the first episode of EastEnders: "Stinks in here dunnit?" just before he found out that Reg Cox (Johnnie Clayton) had been murdered. Early on in the series, the character of Den became central to the programme and was the focus of a controversial storyline involving the teenage pregnancy of Michelle Fowler (Susan Tully). Press interest in the show escalated as journalists continuously tried to predict who had fathered Michelle's baby. In true whodunit fashion, the audience had been kept in the dark as to the real identity of the father and were given teasers implicating several residents on the Square. The audience finally discovered the culprit in Episode 66 of the programme, broadcast on 3 October 1985. The episode was written by series co-creator/script editor Tony Holland and directed by co-creator/producer Julia Smith, and was considered to be a landmark episode in the show's history. Four possible suspects were seen leaving the Square in the early half of the episode: Tony Carpenter (Oscar James), Ali Osman (Nejdet Salih), Andy O'Brien (Ross Davidson) and Den Watts. As Michelle waited by their rendezvous point, a car pulled up and finally the fluffy white legs of Roly the poodle bounded out of the car, and gave it all away: Den Watts was the man meeting Michelle and it was he who had fathered her baby. It was when Den was revealed as the father that his famous nickname "Dirty Den" was created by the British press. The rest of the episode consisted of just one long scene, where Den and Michelle discussed whether or not to keep the baby. Up to that time it was the longest scene ever done in a soap opera, lasting fifteen minutes. For a series that in its first eight months of existence had established a reputation for being fast-moving and rapidly cut, this was a bold experiment. It relied on just the one story and two actors to hold the audience for over half an episode. Tony Holland's handling of the awkward scene between a teenage girl and the father of her best friend is deemed as one of the highlights of EastEnders first year. The finishing touch was the use of an alternative end title music, a variation of the normal one which replaced the dramatic drum beats with a longer, gentler piano solo introduction.

After this storyline the programme started to appear in newspaper cartoons as it moved more and more into the public mainstream. One such cartoon showed the British Prime Minister, Margaret Thatcher, telling her cabinet that the best way to alert the country to the dangers of AIDS was to give the disease to Den.

=== Den and Angie mania ===
During 1986 the series became dominated by Den and Angie's storylines and the focus of the programme was very much concentrated on their volatile relationship. The emphasis began early in 1986 with the arrival of Den's mistress Jan Hammond (Jane How). Jan had been a powerful off-screen presence for the first year, a menacing voice at the end of the telephone, which severely affected the mood of both Den and Angie and kept the audience on edge every time the phone rang. Jan's physical arrival at the Vic in January 1986 was one of the show's dramatic highlights. Her invasion of Angie's territory was a springboard to future emotional fireworks and a precursor to Angie's further dependence on alcohol and her attempted suicide. The characters were used to advertise the show abroad in countries such as America.

Den and Angie's traumatic two-hander episode in October 1986 was another risky experiment for EastEnders — A thirty-minute episode with only two people in it had never been attempted in a soap before. Holland and Smith feared that the episode would not hold up, however press and audience alike were in agreement that it did. Once it was done, it set a precedent and the programme has featured two-handers ever since. The episode was structured like a "tennis match" between Angie and Den, with a non-speaking window cleaner forever strolling innocently into the action. It began with Den trying to tell Angie that he wanted a divorce. Angie was shocked and for a moment defeated, but she then dropped her bombshell and told Den that she only had six months to live. At first Den did not believe her, but eventually Angie's hysterical performance convinced him. He crumbled and promised to stay with her and only after he left did Angie smile in triumph, letting the audience in on her secret that it was all a big lie. Written by Jane Hollowood and directed by Antonia Bird, this episode is considered to be one of the finest episodes in EastEnders' catalogue.

The Den/Angie/Jan triangle was to continue for many months. The climax was a trip to Venice when Angie – convinced that Den had finished with his mistress – was taken there for a second honeymoon, returning to London on the Orient Express. This gave the writers and producers an opportunity to open the show up from the confines of Albert Square. However the trip to Venice was fraught with problems and Dobson, Grantham and Jane How were hounded by the press at all times. Their photographs appeared in British newspapers, thus ruining the shock surprise that Tony Holland had created, by including Den's mistress in the episode. Despite huge efforts from all involved the Venice episodes were only moderately successful, although the revelations discovered by Den in the episode set the scene for one of EastEnders' most renowned episodes, which aired on Christmas Day that year. After over-hearing his wife confess that her illness was fabricated, Den filed for divorce. 30.1 million viewers tuned in on Christmas Day in 1986, to witness Den handing Angie her divorce papers, giving the soap its highest ever episode rating, which has yet to be beaten by any other plotline from any other soap in the UK.

This storyline saw the separation of Den and Angie. Holland and Smith had anticipated that Den and Angie would be popular, but they had not guessed how hysterical the reaction to them would be. It was decided that Den and Angie would have to be played down for a while so that other characters would have the opportunity to shine through. The next 18 months saw Den and Angie struggle to get by without each other, and eventually they reunited as business partners.

=== Arrest and demise ===
However, at the beginning of 1988 Anita Dobson decided that she wanted to move on after three years of playing Angie. She made her final appearance in May that year. Leslie Grantham had also decided that he wanted to move on, but Julia Smith didn't want the programme to suffer the double blow of losing both Den and Angie so close together. The solution to the problem was one of the soap's most complicated and creative exercises, that required intricate planning. The idea was to enable Den to stay as an on-screen presence into 1989, while keeping Grantham working for EastEnders only until the autumn of 1988. Tony Holland and writer/editor Bill Lyons came up with a story to put Den in prison for a year, intending that material recorded in a block of intensive filming would then be included in the programme for the rest of the year. The programme didn't want to make Den into a criminal, however, so he had to be put in prison for doing something that could be justified to the viewing public – otherwise there would be no sympathy for him. The answer lay in a storyline that was running with another character: the rape of Kathy Beale (Gillian Taylforth). After simultaneously getting in way over his head with a criminal organisation (The Firm), Den torched Kathy's rapist's wine bar in retaliation, and was then made to take the blame for the deed by the firm. After he refused, went on the run, and was nearly killed by the firm's heavies, Den turned himself into the police and was put on remand at Dickens Hill prison in September 1988. For the next five months he was seen, in the company of a small group of new but ultimately short-lived characters also confined in the prison, on a regular basis in EastEnders. This material was shot in less than a month at Dartmoor Prison, Devon. When these segments were written and recorded, they were done so entirely in isolation and in advance; the production team had no real idea of other material that would have to fit around it.

The character was eventually to bow out on 23 February 1989 in one of the programme's most famous episodes which attracted well over 24 million viewers. After being abducted by a group of gangsters who ambushed the taxi taking him to court, Den escaped from his captors and returned to the famous canal (in Alperton) for one last rendezvous with Michelle. The episode ended with Den being shot by a member of the firm (who was carrying a gun concealed in a bunch of daffodils) and then falling into the canal. The scene where Den actually hit the water had to be taped at the BBC's Ealing Film Studios using a water tank, because the waters of the Grand Union Canal were deemed unsafe. When the episode was finished, however, Jonathan Powell, controller of BBC1, requested that the final shot be removed to allow for the possibility of Den returning in the future. In protest, Tony Holland and Julia Smith had their names taken off the episode's credits. Den's exit ended up being the creators' final contribution to the show.

=== Controversial return ===
However, after 14 years presumed dead, executive-producer Louise Berridge made the highly controversial decision to reintroduce the character to the series and reunite him with his adopted daughter Sharon, played by Letitia Dean. Grantham has alleged that the producers of EastEnders asked him to reprise the role many times since 1991, but he turned each offer down as he was unhappy with the returning storylines. Subsequent offers between 1995 and 2001 were also rejected because Den's screen family were no longer in the show and Grantham felt that a return at this time would have been little more than a publicity stunt. However, he accepted Berridge's offer to return in 2003, as he approved of the storyline, and because Den had family ties within the cast – his adopted daughter Sharon had returned after six years away, his other daughter Vicki was due to return, and Dennis Rickman (Nigel Harman), the son Den did not know about, was also due to join.

The reintroduction of Den was part of a plan by scriptwriters to fight back against the continued success of ITV's long-running soap, Coronation Street. The character made his "dramatic return" in an episode that aired on 29 September 2003. On-screen, Den walked into Sharon's nightclub, Angie's Den, and greeted his stunned daughter with the words "Hello, princess." More than 16 million viewers watched his long-awaited homecoming, attracting 62% of the viewing public; it has been voted as the favourite TV soap comeback in an AOL online poll of over 23,000 viewers, taking over a third of the vote (37%).

Despite claims from the British press that the plot was unrealistic and that it questioned the show's credibility, Den's return sparked a huge increase in ratings for the last few months of 2003. After a successful Christmas storyline, Grantham took a short break from the show after securing a lengthy contract. However, a severe press backlash followed after actor Grantham was outed in an internet sex scandal in May 2004, which coincided with a swift decline in EastEnders ratings. Grantham was subsequently suspended for two months and his character departed on 30 August, before returning on the episode broadcast on 11 November. the character was later killed off in a high-profile storyline, which saw his body buried in the cellar of The Queen Vic.

Grantham has denied that he was dismissed from the show as punishment for the internet sex scandal. He has claimed in his autobiography that he only ever intended to return to the soap for 18 months so his character's second demise would tie in with the show's 20th anniversary.

In 2006, EastEnders' scriptwriter Tony Jordan revealed how it was his idea to bring Den back in 2003. Jordan had started working at EastEnders in 1989, after Den had already left the series. Jordan had always wanted to write material for Den and Angie and so he campaigned for the return of Den for many years. He told the Daily Mirror, "At story conferences I'd say, 'How do we know he's dead? They never found a body'. Eventually, just to shut me up, they made me write an episode where Den's body was found and identified by his ring." Jordan finally got his way in 2003; however, according to the writer, Grantham's internet sex scandal spelled the demise of the character. Commenting on this, Jordan said, "If [the scandal] hadn't come out I think it would have worked and he'd still be in the show. When I saw him on screen after those revelations came out, suddenly I couldn't believe in the character any more. I was starting to love the character and buying into all of it, but after that I saw him as Leslie Grantham – not Den Watts. He was older, and flawed in all the wrong ways. I think a lot of viewers felt the same, and the cast as well, probably."

== Storylines ==
=== 1985–1989 ===
On Christmas Day 1986, 30.1 million viewers watched as Den served Angie with divorce papers.

Den Watts and his wife Angie (Anita Dobson) are landlords of The Queen Victoria public house in Albert Square, Walford. They have been there since the 1970s. Married since 1968, Angie was unable to have children of her own, and in 1972 they adopted a three-year-old girl called Sharon.

Den also has a mistress, Jan Hammond (Jane How). He gets Michelle Fowler (Susan Tully), the 16-year-old best friend of his adopted daughter Sharon (Letitia Dean), pregnant – but she refuses to name the father, fearing repercussions for Den and herself. Den and Angie's relationship starts to fall apart when she meets Jan, but when Angie attempts suicide, Den ends his relationship with Jan despite preferring it to be the other way around. When Michelle gives birth to their daughter, Vicki, she refuses to give Den any contact with her – though he financially supports Michelle in secret. For many years the secret is kept hidden but Michelle's mother, Pauline (Wendy Richard), is one of the first to realise the truth, igniting a feud between her and Den, which intensifies when he admits to her in January 1988 that he is indeed Vicki's father, and she slaps him in response.

Soon enough, Den plans to leave Angie permanently; hoping to stop him, Angie claims that she is dying and has only six months to live in October 1986. Den chooses to stay with her and tries to rebuild their relationship, promising to be there for her until her death. He takes Angie to Venice for a second honeymoon, but meets Jan, who is also there. Feeling guilty about her lie, Angie gets drunk on the way home via the Orient Express and admits to a barman that she is not dying, unaware that Den has overheard her drunken confession. He bides his time and gets revenge by serving her divorce papers on Christmas Day.

The couple's divorce is finalised in 1987 and Angie damages Den by demanding a large divorce settlement. Den runs The Queen Vic alone, initially assisted by Jan, but this relationship ends when Jan grows disillusioned with Den's treatment of her. Den has a fling with The Queen Vic's caterer, Magda Czajkowski (Kathryn Apanowicz), but is scorned when she eventually opts to date the much younger Simon Wicks (Nick Berry) instead. When he discovers that they are seeing each other, he punches Simon, sacks him and throws him out of his home in The Queen Vic. He gets revenge on the two by manipulating an immature Simon into flirting with other women when his relationship with Magda hits a rough patch. Simon eventually starts seeing Donna Ludlow (Matilda Ziegler), and his rejection hurts Magda. Den uses this opportunity. He feigns mock sympathy and seduces her, but before he gets her into bed, he tells her that he has to go on an errand. He instructs Magda to "get ready" for him, telling her that he will be back soon. He then leaves Magda undressed and waiting in his bed for hours, before instructing Simon's mother, Pat Wicks (Pam St Clement), to inform her that he is otherwise engaged, leaving her humiliated.

Whilst single again, Den begins to realise that The Queen Vic's trade is floundering without Angie. With some meddling from Sharon, Den and Angie decide to reunite as business partners and she returns to live at The Queen Vic. However, it is short-lived, because Angie falls in love with her friend, Sonny. Realising that Angie is planning to leave him, Den visits a solicitor and makes certain that Angie has no claim on The Queen Vic. Angie leaves Walford for Spain in May 1988 with nothing, and they never see each other again.

Having had a lengthy association with the criminal organisation known as The Firm, Den's involvement escalates over the summer of 1988. He sells The Queen Vic to Pat and her fiancée Frank Butcher (Mike Reid) and takes over Strokes wine bar, which he runs with Joanne Francis (Pamela Salem). The wine bar is merely a front to the Firm's illegal gambling den. When Kathy Beale (Gillian Taylforth) is raped by James Willmott-Brown (William Boyde), Den manipulates a Firm member, Brad Williams (Jonathan Stratt), to burn down The Dagmar (Willmott-Brown's wine bar) in revenge and the next day, he smugly hints to Willmott-Brown that he organised it, before pinning him against a wall and threatening him. This, however, is against the Firm's wishes, so when the police investigation starts suspecting the Firm's involvement and what the Strokes wine bar is really used for, the Firm's bosses force Den to take the blame for the arson to distance their organisation from the attack. They take Den to a safe house in Manchester, promising to alter his identity, but Den realises this is a cover and that the Firm are planning to kill him. Den escapes and hands himself in to the police to save his life and is remanded in custody in September 1988 at Dickens Hill prison.

In Dickens Hill, Den struggles initially, as many inmates refuse to trust him. Homosexual inmate Queenie Price (John Labanowski) takes an instant dislike to Den and suspects him of being a "grass", leading to Queenie and his friends beating him up in his cell. Despite this, Den unveils Queenie as the true prison snitch and gains respect, rising through the ranks to become "No.1" of his landing. On the outside, the Firm still feel that Den is a liability; fearing that he will tell the police about their dealings and decide that Den has to die.

Den was shot by a man carrying a gun, hidden in a bunch of daffodils.

They ambush and kidnap Den when he is being accompanied to trial on 23 February 1989, but Den escapes again and makes plans to leave the country. He contacts Michelle, requesting that they meet by a canal where they have held secret meetings in the past, so he can say goodbye to her and Vicki. Unaware that the Firm is following her, Michelle unwittingly brings them to Den, and he is shot by a man who is hiding a gun in a bunch of daffodils. A splash is heard, indicating that Den has fallen into the canal. The police search for Den's body but do not find anything until Sharon finds Den's signet ring for sale on a market stall in April 1990 and requests that the canal is searched again, unaware that Den was not wearing it when he was shot. This time, a body is found and identified as that of Den.

=== 2003–2005 ===
In the intervening years, Sharon and Vicki grow up, although not always living in Walford, and in early 2003, they discover that Den has a son he did not know of, Dennis Rickman (Nigel Harman), who joins them in Albert Square. Dennis was the product of Den's fling 30 years earlier with a younger woman, Paula Rickman, the daughter of one of Den's friends.

Like Den, Dennis has been involved with The Firm, and after some investigating he discovers that Den is not actually dead; after surviving the shooting in 1989, Den fled to Spain with help from Jan and lived there in hiding for the next 14 years, while everyone else in Walford believed he was dead.

The body found in 1990 was in fact that of gangland boss Mr. Vinnicombe, who was murdered as punishment for failing in his attempt to have Den killed.

Hearing this, Vicki traces Den and brings him back to Walford in September 2003. Sharon has mixed emotions, being pleased that he is alive, but angry that he faked his own death, and also berating him for his mistakes that he made before his alleged death. Dennis explains that the body found in the canal was that of Vinnicombe, a senior member of The Firm, who was murdered as punishment for Den's escape and dumped in the canal, his teeth having been bricked out to prevent dental identification. Vinnicombe's body had wrongly been identified as that of Den, and Jan had assisted in this coverup by planting Den's signet ring by the canal to make it appear that the attempt on his life had been successful.

Den's grievances with The Firm are pardoned by its acting boss, Andy Hunter (Michael Higgs), who has taken over from the recently murdered Jack Dalton – who was shot dead by Dennis after revealing that Den had survived the shooting.

Eventually, Sharon forgives him and Den returns to live in Walford to assist Sharon in managing her nightclub, Angie's Den. Police soon learn of Den's return to Walford and promptly arrest him for perverting the course of justice. However, Den remains silent during intense questioning and the police ultimately decide not to charge him with any crimes, realising that he had still been in Spain when Dalton was killed.

Den soon gets embroiled in a feud with Sharon's former boyfriend, Phil Mitchell (Steve McFadden), after hearing that Phil hit her and also arranged for Dennis to be beaten up by a gang. As revenge, Den has sex with Phil's younger sister Sam (Kim Medcalf) – then dumps her promptly. He later promises another of Phil's former girlfriends, Lisa Fowler (Lucy Benjamin), that he will help her get back her daughter Louise, who is in Phil's custody. After Phil plants drugs in the club and nearly gets it shut down, Den fakes a truce and talks Phil into accompanying him and Dennis on a warehouse robbery. Den bides his time and organises a scam to get Phil imprisoned. During the robbery, Den takes the money and obstructs Phil's getaway, resulting in Phil getting caught by the police and remanded in custody on a charge of armed robbery. Den then helps Lisa flee the country with Louise, after Phil's current wife, Kate (Jill Halfpenny), hands her over to Lisa after deciding to cut all ties with Phil. The feud brings Dennis closer to his father. Having lost his wife, his daughter and his freedom, Phil manages to escape several weeks later, confronting Den on Christmas Day; after an intense brawl in which Den hits Phil with a chair to avoid being killed, Den pays Phil off and the latter flees. Den then spends the rest of Christmas happily with his family, before leaving for Spain on Boxing Day to tie up some loose ends.

Family problems arise when Den returns three months later and discovers that Sharon and Dennis are in a romantic relationship; Den considers it to be incest, despite Sharon and Dennis not being blood related. During an intense meeting between the two in The Queen Vic, Den calmly attempts to persuade Dennis to break up with Sharon, but when this fails, he turns nasty and mocks Dennis for believing that their bonding at Christmas was real. This leaves Dennis deeply upset but he recovers, and again refuses to break up with Sharon, leading to Den clashing with him in The Queen Vic. Dennis laughs this off and tells Den that he is leaving to return to Sharon. Playing his last card, Den goads Dennis about his neglected childhood and implies that he suffered sexual abuse whilst in care, successfully provoking Dennis into accidentally hitting Sharon, who had just arrived, whilst trying to attack Den. A guilt-ridden Den later apologises and explains his reasons for not wanting his son and daughter together, because he wants both of them in his life, and he cannot have that if they are in a relationship. Den then tries to explain to Dennis that his feelings for Sharon are simply misguided due to the abuse he supposedly suffered as a child, which leaves Dennis confused and he decides to break up with Sharon to have a father-son relationship.

In the spring of 2004, it is revealed that Den had married his second wife Chrissie (Tracy-Ann Oberman) in Spain in 1999 and left her there when he returned to Walford. She soon arrives in Walford to collect some money from him. She decides to stay in Walford with Den and his children, and the Watts family restore their close bond. Den plays a heroic role when a fairground collapses in Walford and he saves numerous residents. He also tells Pete's son Ian Beale (Adam Woodyatt) that his former wife Laura's (Hannah Waterman) baby son Bobby (Kevin Curran), is actually his and encourages him to be a father to him – with Den himself knowing how much a strain his own absence had on Dennis's life. Ian had evicted Laura when she revealed she was pregnant, as he had undergone a vasectomy – this led Laura to believe that Garry Hobbs (Ricky Groves) had got her pregnant following an earlier fling. Ian eventually accepts Bobby as his son and asks Den to be godfather at the christening.

However, Den still cannot remain monogamous, and when Chrissie discovers that he has been having an affair with Kate, she leaves Walford. Furious with Den, Sharon and Vicki leave on holiday and contrary to his claims, Den is also troubled by Chrissie's departure. To cope with this, Den becomes more reckless and tries to reassert his bachelor status. He hosts a poker game at his house which eventually turns serious when only him and Andy Hunter remain. In a bid to get the Vic back, Den puts his house and club on the line but is narrowly beaten by Andy. Andy neglects to take Den's stake but does tell Den to get his life sorted.

Looking for revenge on Andy, Den convinces Pat to help him pull a scam in Andy's bookies, where Pat happens to work. The scam is initially successful and Den celebrates. However, Andy discovers the scam and humiliates Den in The Queen Vic by revealing the poker game, just as Sharon returns. The next day, Dennis sends Den home from the club after he nearly gets into a fight with one of his own bouncers. Whilst at home, Den makes a pass at Dennis's 20-year-old girlfriend, Zoe Slater (Michelle Ryan), which Dennis witnesses. After receiving some harsh words, Den punches Dennis and leaves the house, where he sees a few teenagers breaking into the laundrette. After saving Dot, the two have a heart-to-heart, and Den agrees to call Chrissie. Upon meeting with Chrissie, Den decides he needs to get some time away and returns to Spain for a few weeks.

Den returns in November 2004, apparently a new man. He apologises to Ian, Pat and his family for his earlier mistakes. He also forces an older boyfriend of Vicki's to leave after discovering he cheated on her. Chrissie agrees to get back with Den after much convincing but threatens to kill him if he ever cheats again.

To rebuild his family, Den attempts to regain The Queen Vic from the Mitchells just before Christmas 2004, by blackmailing their lawyer Marcus Christie (Stephen Churchett) into convincing Sam that Phil, who is still on the run, needs immediate money. Sam sells The Queen Vic to Den at a vastly reduced price and he reinstates his family at the pub in time for Christmas. Den re-cements his villainous status by kicking the Moon family out on Christmas Eve. With his pub back and his family together, Den looks to the future.

Den's downfall ironically begins just hours later on Christmas Eve when he discovers that Sharon and Dennis have resumed their affair. On Christmas Day, he hears that they are planning on leaving for the United States, unless he can accept them both as a couple. To split them up, Den persuades Zoe to lie that she is pregnant with Dennis's baby, which is successful, and he gleefully watches as Dennis soon decides to stay with Zoe. However, Den's plan backfires when Sharon decides to leave alone instead, as she is unwilling to allow Dennis to leave his unborn child. While trying to persuade Sharon to stay, a panicking Den lets slip that he does not love Vicki as much as he loves her, not realising that Vicki was behind him and overheard everything. Vicki then decides to leave with Sharon. Den is horrified to have lost both of his daughters at Christmas, ironically because of his own lies and deceit, despite having succeeded in splitting up Sharon and Dennis.

Chrissie kneeling over Den's corpse during the 20th anniversary episode. Consolidated figures reveal the episode was seen by over 17 million viewers (nearly third of the British population).

In apparent retribution towards Dennis for inadvertently being the cause of Sharon's departure, Den continues his baby lie with Zoe to ensure that Dennis stays. With Sharon gone, Den becomes more evil and twisted, ignoring Chrissie's pleading with him to be thankful for the family he still has left with him in Walford. Zoe is unable to find a man to have sex with her in order to create a real pregnancy, so Den manipulates her into having sex with him so that she can get pregnant and pretend the baby is that of Dennis. Following this, an ashamed Zoe attempts to back out of their arrangement, but Den spitefully blackmails her into continuing the lie, revealing his intention to cause misery for her and Dennis for causing Sharon's departure. When Zoe decides to tell Chrissie, Den laughs off the threat and reveals he does not care about his marriage. With no options left and desperate to keep Dennis, Zoe carries on the lie with Den.

During this time, Den pretends to care for Dennis, who finally begins to see him as a father figure. Dennis also looks forward to being a father and even begins to feel love for Zoe, who he had initially shunned out of his feelings for Sharon. However, when Dennis eventually catches Zoe and Den in bed together, he rejects the two of them and packs his bags. Despite this, Den appears pleased.

In the wake of this, Dennis leaves in search of Sharon, but not before encountering Chrissie and telling her about Zoe and Den's affair. Chrissie does not reveal to Den that she knows what he has done.

Instead, Chrissie slowly plans her revenge and when Zoe discovers she is pregnant with Den's child, Chrissie persuades her to abort the baby, not letting on that she knows Den is the baby's father. She also concocts a plan of revenge to gain ownership of The Queen Vic from Den. She recruits Zoe and Sam (both also scorned by Den) and they confront him after closing time at The Queen Vic, one evening in February 2005. Den taunts them all for their weaknesses and refuses to sign over The Queen Vic, even when Chrissie threatens to reveal Den's true character to the rest of the Square. Den smugly admits to everything he has done but is left stunned when Sharon emerges from the shadows – Chrissie has lured her back from America with the pretence that Den was seriously ill, in order for her to hear Den's confession to everything that he had done.

Despite Den's desperate explanations, Sharon disowns Den and leaves in a cab. In a rage, Den violently throws Chrissie against a fruit machine and is only stopped by Zoe, who hits him over the head with an iron doorstop in The Queen Vic, and believes she has killed him. Minutes later, whilst Sam and Zoe go upstairs, Den stirs and grabs Chrissie's ankle, telling her, "You'll never get me out of The Vic!" Chrissie responds by striking him over the head again, finally managing to kill him.

Sam secretly witnesses the fatal blow, but Chrissie continues to allow Zoe to think it is she who has killed Den. The three women bury Den in The Queen Vic cellar and concrete it over. Arguments between the women occur, and Sam and Chrissie become embroiled in a feud to regain ownership of The Queen Vic, with Sam blackmailing Chrissie and eventually digging up Den's body in the hope that Chrissie will be imprisoned, and Chrissie subsequently framing Sam for Den's murder, which leads to Sam's imprisonment. Sharon and Dennis had returned to Walford and married by the time this happened, and she eventually learns the truth when Phil and his brother Grant (Ross Kemp) – who had previously been married to Sharon during Den's 14-year absence – return to help their mother Peggy (Barbara Windsor) bring down Chrissie and prove Sam innocent. It is then that both the Mitchell and Watts families found themselves entangled in a conflict with Den's old friend, Johnny Allen (Billy Murray), a local mob boss who recently usurped Andy from his position as Walford's reigning crime kingpin; on the night of Den's murder, Johnny killed Andy by throwing him off a motorway flyover, although the coroner recorded a verdict of suicide.

After working together to extract CCTV footage of Chrissie confessing Den's murder to her boyfriend Jake Moon (Joel Beckett) in Johnny's nightclub, Dennis and Sharon help the Mitchells prove Sam's innocence; the police are called and Chrissie is arrested after Sharon intercepts her attempt to flee the country via the airport, and avenges Den's death by punching her whilst echoing the last words she told Den before killing him.

Following Chrissie's arrest, she is later sentenced to life imprisonment after pleading guilty, and Den is finally given a proper burial in his "original" grave next to Angie.

In 2015, it is revealed that Den was once in a gang which included Phil's father Eric Mitchell, along with his partner-in-crime Gavin Sullivan (Paul Nicholas) and their associates: Henry Hubbard and Ted Hills (Brian Croucher). It soon transpires that Gavin is actually Sharon's biological father, and that Den had apparently done a deal with Gavin: he would adopt Sharon in exchange for Gavin partaking in one of Den's criminal jobs.

== Reception ==
Despite the controversy surrounding Grantham, the character of Den remains one of the most popular and high-profile characters in EastEnders history and was voted the 75th greatest television character of all time in a Channel 4 poll. He has also been branded the villain "you most love to hate" and was voted the number one TV Bastard in a 2002 poll. In addition, the moment when Den served Angie divorce papers has been voted the number one soap moment of all time in a 2004 poll. In 2020, Sara Wallis and Ian Hyland from The Daily Mirror placed Den second on their ranked list of the best EastEnders characters of all time, calling him "a swindling love rat" and the "biggest villain of them all" who had a "stormy marriage" to Angie, as well as noting how Den shocked Sharon "and the nation" when he was revealed to be alive in 2003. In a 2021 Radio Times poll, Den and Angie were voted as the joint fourth "soap pub landlord", receiving 8% of the votes.

== Impact on popular culture ==
In the short story Brief Encounter: Mistaken Identity by Gary Russell, published in Doctor Who Magazine Edition 174, the mercenary Lytton meets Den Watts in the Queen Victoria and mistakes him for Davros's adjutant Kiston. Leslie Grantham had played Kiston in an early television role in the Doctor Who serial Resurrection of the Daleks.

The 2006 episode of Doctor Who entitled "Army of Ghosts" features a scene where Peggy Mitchell tells the "ghost" of Den to "get outta my pub!" as the only spirits that will be served are vodka, whisky and gin. Given that the episode later reveals the "ghosts" to be fully converted Cybermen, Leslie Grantham is not seen in this episode.

In 1986, the duo Whisky and Sofa released a single called "Dirty Den", with lyrics making direct references to the character.

In an episode of the fifth season of Old Harry's Game, Satan (the main character), takes control of the BBC and, in an effort to improve human morality, decides to insert moral messages into EastEnders, including reintroducing Den as a "force for good", when executives challenge Den's reintroduction, stating that he can no longer feature in the show as he was murdered, Satan replies dismissively "Oh, he's always being murdered", a reference to Den's 2003 resurrection.

In the Gavin & Stacey Christmas special, Bryn, played by Rob Brydon, mentions that he stopped watching EastEnders when Den returned to the show in 2003.

== See also ==
- List of soap opera villains
