= The Banned (EastEnders) =

- Clockwise from top left: Eddie, Ian, Harry, Simon, Kelvin, Sharon

Background information
- Genres: Pop/rock
- Years active: 1986 (fictional)
- Past members: Harry Reynolds (Gareth Potter; band manager); Eddie Hunter (Simon Henderson; guitar); Simon Wicks (Nick Berry; keyboards); Kelvin Carpenter (Paul J. Medford; vocals); Sharon Watts (Letitia Dean; vocals); Ian Beale (Adam Woodyatt; drums)

The Banned is a fictional band in the BBC soap opera EastEnders. The storyline first aired in 1986 and, although it was considered to be a failure on-screen, it nevertheless became a successful part of the serial's extensive merchandising industry that year, as it spawned two hit singles on the UK singles chart ("Every Loser Wins" and "Something Outa Nothing").

== Storyline development and impact ==
In 1986, the creators of EastEnders, scriptwriter Tony Holland and producer Julia Smith, decided to tackle "an important and complicated story about the ups and downs of a pop group." The idea was considered to be an "interesting and major undertaking" in the serial. It featured the majority of teenage characters in the soap at the time. Prominent characters such as Sharon Watts (Letitia Dean), Ian Beale (Adam Woodyatt), Simon Wicks (Nick Berry) and Kelvin Carpenter (Paul J. Medford), were joined by several new characters, introduced especially for the storyline, including "lefty-student stereotype" Harry Reynolds (Gareth Potter). Actors such as Paul Medford, Letitia Dean and Nick Berry were musically trained, having attended London stage schools. They were chosen as the group's singers, and renamed themselves "The Banned" after their first gig got them kicked out of The Queen Victoria public house.

The storyline proved to be a successful merchandising tool for the serial, as it spawned two hit singles in the "real world". Actor Nick Berry released a ballad entitled "Every Loser Wins" in October 1986, having previously sung the song in character on-screen (accompanied by a piano). The song was written and produced by Stewart and Bradley James, along with Simon May who famously composed the EastEnders theme tune. "Every Loser Wins" was a smash hit, reaching number one on the UK Singles Chart, where it stayed for three weeks, knocking Madonna's "True Blue" off the top spot. It was the second biggest-selling single in the UK that year after "Don't Leave Me This Way" by the Communards, and held the record as the highest climbing chart single ever until 2001, when it was eclipsed by "It's the Way You Make Me Feel" by Steps (which climbed from 72–2). "Every Loser Wins" sold over a million copies and earned composer Simon May an Ivor Novello award. The song "also provided levity" on-screen, when it was used as Lofty Holloway's (Tom Watt) break-up song after Michelle Fowler (Susan Tully) had jilted him at the altar. One critic has commented "[Lofty] played it to death. He played it so much it caused Dirty Den (Leslie Grantham) to ask whether he had any other records". The second song "Something Outa Nothing" (also performed in the on-screen serial) was released by Letitia Dean and Paul Medford. The song was a modest success, making number 12 on the UK Singles Chart in November 1986.

Although the plot produced two hit singles in the real world, the actual storyline was not a great success with viewers. EastEnders creators Julia Smith and Tony Holland both felt it lacked credibility and branded it an experiment that failed. The plot has since been described as "a horrific scenario where fact and soap merged in messy fashion to give the fictional band a real-life hit with the appalling 'Something Out of Nothing'." The songs, which "were recorded when the show was riding high on huge ratings success", have not aged well in critical opinion. A critic for The Guardian newspaper has commented that "The Banned" was EastEnders' "Eighties bid to add a pop angle to their socially conscious template", which "went down like the proverbial ton of bricks". In 2004, "Something Outa Nothing" was voted the 9th worst single ever released by a soap star. Though extremely popular at the time, "Every Loser Wins" has since been branded "a tuneless ode".

== Plot ==
The band started life off-screen, where Simon Wicks (Nick Berry) and Eddie Hunter (Simon Henderson) were bandmates. Before Simon came to Walford, he had borrowed money from loan sharks for their band's musical equipment and was left owing them huge amounts of money that he couldn't pay back. Eddie was happy to leave Simon with the debt and disappeared to work at Suttons Holiday Camp in Clacton so the band dissolved. With the debts finally repaid, and needing an ally to support him in the new band, Simon contacts Eddie and asks him to join.

The reformed group consist of Simon, Eddie, Kelvin Carpenter (Paul J. Medford), Sharon Watts (Letitia Dean), Ian Beale (Adam Woodyatt) and band manager Harry Reynolds. They initially call themselves Dog Market, after dismissing Sharon's "So So Reverso" and Simon's "Bottled Up", "Left of Arthur" (a reference to Arthur Scargill), "Conjugal Rights" and Lofty's (Tom Watt) "The Harry Reynolds Quartet". Eddie is the lead guitarist. Kelvin's girlfriend, Tessa Parker (Josephine Melville), also wants to join, but she has no musical talent and is refused membership.

They are due to have their debut in The Queen Victoria public house in August 1986, but after their enormous amplifier fuses the electricity in the pub during a performance of "Venus", publican Den Watts (Leslie Grantham) throws them out, shouting after them "You're banned!", after which the group change their name to The Banned.

Simon and Harry constantly disagree with the direction the band is taking. Harry loses his argument to make the band a vehicle for communist propaganda and blames Wicksy for the band taking a more practical attitude. They all decide to enter a competition for young musicians, and both Harry and Simon vow to outdo each other by writing the best song to perform. The rest of the band all prefer Simon's song, "Something Outa Nothing", which infuriates Harry and he starts bad-mouthing him to the rest of the band, saying he is superfluous and a closet BBC Radio 2 listener. Simon then declares that the band has to choose between him and Harry, but as Harry owns all the instruments and equipment, they side with him and Simon quits. Simon writes his own solo song called "Every Loser Wins". He doesn't get very far however, and by the end of the year he gives up his dream of becoming a musician.

Simon allows the band to continue using his song, "Something Outa Nothing", for the competition. The day of the competition comes and for some reason Harry, who is a political activist, decides to sabotage their performance by switching the cartridge in the synthesizer, wrecking any hopes the group have of getting anywhere. They are humiliated, and the rest of the band are furious when Harry confesses that he sabotaged their performance to show them up.

== Specially introduced characters ==
As well as the regular characters featured in the storyline (Sharon, Simon, Ian and Kelvin), a number of new characters were introduced specifically for the duration of the storyline.

=== Harry Reynolds ===
Harry Reynolds
- EastEnders character
- Portrayed by: Gareth Potter
- First appearance: Episode 137; 10 June 1986
- Last appearance: Episode 178; 30 October 1986
In-universe information
- Occupation: Student

Harry Reynolds, played by Gareth Potter, is a college friend of Kelvin Carpenter (Paul J. Medford) who first appears along with Tessa Parker (Josephine Melville) in June 1986. Both Harry and Tessa have radical Marxist beliefs and it isn't long before they manage to recruit Kelvin to the same way of thinking.

Soon after his arrival, Harry, Kelvin and several other Walford youths decide to form a band. Harry is the manager, Ian Beale (Adam Woodyatt) plays drums, Sharon Watts (Letitia Dean) and Kelvin provide vocals, Simon Wicks (Nick Berry) plays the keyboards and Eddie Hunter (Simon Henderson) is the lead guitarist. Harry and Kelvin decide that the band's music should demonstrate "decay in the capitalistic society" and have a strong political message.

Simon and Harry begin to disagree with the direction the band is taking. Harry loses his argument to make the band a vehicle for communist propaganda, and blames Wicksy for the band taking a more practical attitude. They all decide to enter a competition for young musicians, and both Harry and Simon vow to outdo each other by writing the best song to perform. The rest of the band all prefer Simon's song, which infuriates Harry and he starts bad-mouthing him to the rest of the band, saying he is superfluous and a closet BBC Radio 2 listener. Simon then declares that the band has to choose between him and Harry, but as Harry owns all the instruments and equipment, they side with him and Simon quits. On the day of the competition, Harry decides to sabotage the band's performance by switching the cartridge in the synthesizer, wrecking any hopes the group have of getting anywhere. The rest of the band are furious, particularly when Harry confesses that he did it to show them up. Harry is shunned after this and is not seen in Walford again. His last appearance is in October 1986.

=== Tessa Parker ===
Tessa Parker
- EastEnders character
- Portrayed by: Josephine Melville
- First appearance: Episode 137; 10 June 1986
- Last appearance: Episode 145; 8 July 1986
In-universe information
- Occupation: Student

Tessa Parker, played by Josephine Melville, is a college friend of Kelvin Carpenter (Paul J. Medford) and Harry Reynolds (Gareth Potter) who first appears in June 1986. Both Harry and Tessa have radical Marxist beliefs and it isn't long before they manage to recruit Kelvin to the same way of thinking. Tessa soon discovers that she and Kelvin have more in common than their beliefs. She finds him attractive and they start dating.

Their romance quickly fades when Kelvin becomes more interested in pop music than overthrowing the Thatcher government. He sings with a group known as Dog Market and its successor, The Banned. Tessa secretly wants to be in the group but she has no musical talent and is refused membership. She quietly leaves Albert Square when Kelvin tells her it is time for them to "pack it in". Her last appearance is in July 1986. She appeared in eight episodes.

Melville reappeared in the soap in 2005, playing the role of Ellie Wright in one episode.

=== Eddie Hunter ===
Eddie Hunter
- EastEnders character
- Portrayed by: Simon Henderson
- Duration: 1986–1987
- First appearance: Episode 140; 19 June 1986
- Last appearance: Episode 201; 15 January 1987
In-universe information
- Occupation: Musician

Eddie Hunter, played by Simon Henderson, is a flamboyantly dressed friend of Simon Wicks (Nick Berry) and he is first seen in Albert Square in June 1986. Eddie and Simon were part of a band, and before Simon came to Walford, he had borrowed money from loan sharks and was left owing them huge amounts of money that he couldn't pay back. Eddie was happy to leave Simon with the debt and disappeared to work as a redcoat in Clacton, so the band dissolved. However, when the debts are finally repaid, Simon decides to regroup and he contacts Eddie to rejoin the band. The reformed group, known as "The Banned", consist of Simon, Eddie, Kelvin Carpenter (Paul J. Medford), Sharon Watts (Letitia Dean), Ian Beale (Adam Woodyatt) and Harry Reynolds (Gareth Potter). Eddie is the lead guitarist.

The Banned take part in a competition for a music contract, but Harry, who is a political activist, sabotages their performance and they end up being booed off stage. The Banned split up after this and Eddie disappears. Months later, Eddie attends Kelvin's eighteenth birthday party and tells Simon and Ian that Harry is managing a band in Twickenham.
