= Andy O'Brien (EastEnders) =

Fictional character from the BBC soap opera EastEnders

- EastEnders character
- Portrayed by: Ross Davidson
- Duration: 1985–1986
- First appearance: Episode 10; 21 March 1985
- Last appearance: Episode 156; 14 August 1986
- Created by: Tony Holland and Julia Smith
- Book appearances: Good Intentions
In-universe information
- Occupation: Staff nurse

Andy O'Brien is a fictional character from the BBC soap opera EastEnders, played by Ross Davidson. One of the original characters created for the series, Andy made his first appearance one month after the show first broadcast, in the 10th episode on 21 March 1985. Portrayed as altruistic and middle-classed, Andy and his girlfriend Debbie were an attempt to represent gentrification of the East End. Despite Davidson claiming that there had been plans for his character, Andy is the first regular character in EastEnders to be killed off. Davidson claimed this was due to an altercation between himself and Executive Producer and show creator, Julia Smith. He was killed in August 1986 when he was hit by an out of control lorry.

== Creation ==
Andy O'Brien was one of the original twenty-three characters invented by the creators of EastEnders, Tony Holland and Julia Smith. The character of Andy along with his girlfriend Debbie Wilkins were an attempt by Holland and Smith to represent the influx of middle-classed people that were opting to move to the usually working-class areas of the East End of London. Gentrification of the East End was on the increase in the 1980s, and in Holland's experience, the new, wealthier residents were never welcomed or truly accepted within the community, and this was what he hoped to convey on-screen with these two characters.

Andy's original character outline as written by Smith and Holland appeared in an abridged form in their book, EastEnders: The Inside Story.

"Debbie and Andy are living together, they're not married — but it's a serious relationship... Andy, a Scot, has a very practical contented element in his make-up... A succession of foster-parents... He always seemed to be part of families that genuinely wanted him. It's made him very secure, a little smug, perhaps? Student Nurse at Glasgow Royal Infirmary... Unlike Debbie, who's an ambitious woman working in a traditionally male world, Andy is a very unambitious man working in a traditionally female world... They became in love with the idea that everyone thought they were the perfect couple... The decision to attempt the experiment of living together: A "domestic" relationship, was a difficult one, and they agonised over it for months. Wouldn't they get bored? Would they feel imprisoned? How would they fill the hours, with only the two of them?... They want to knock down walls, put in double-glazing, and all the rest of it.... Forced to move into a different class... They're not habitat/Guardian East-end, and they're certainly not nouveau-riche, but they are, to a lot of people, a possible sign of a shape of things to come in the Borough..." (page 62)

Holland required the character of Andy to be somewhere between a wimp and macho; to be on an equal footing with his partner and to represent newish thinking about the male role and equal opportunities. Ross Davidson, a sporty working-class Scot was eventually cast, although Holland and Smith felt he came across as a male chauvinist.

== Development ==
According to Smith and Holland, Andy and Debbie were created to represent a young couple with outwardly mobile pretensions, but it was decided that the formula did not work and both characters were eventually written out of the show. Andy ended up being the first main character to be killed off in 1986, just over a year after the show began. During this time, rumours began to circulate in the British press that Ross Davidson was dropped because Julia Smith disapproved of the off-screen relationship he was having with Shirley Cheriton, the actress who played Debbie. This was denied by Smith in EastEnders: The Inside Story.

In 1994, Davidson gave his own account of why Andy was written out of the serial to the American-based fan newspaper, Walford Gazette. He stated that hostility arose between him and Smith following the recording of an EastEnders LP of cockney songs. The producer of that LP thought it would be a great idea if Davidson and Cheriton (known to be dating in real life) were to make a record of their own. Cheriton refused but Davidson accepted and took on the producer as his manager. BBC Records were not pleased and following an altercation between the head of BBC Records and the producer, Davidson had an altercation with Julia Smith, who Davidson claimed had never been happy that he and Cheriton were dating in the first place. Davidson comments, "I made the mistake of telling off Julia Smith. She was a bit rude to me and I unfortunately reacted like a Celt." Their argument escalated until Smith threatened to write Andy out of EastEnders, and Davidson's angry response was to tell her to kill his character off if she intended to write him out. Andy was subsequently killed in a motor accident shortly after. Davidson commented, "I would have like to have stayed another 6 months to a year, but like a lot of their characters, it was time to move on."

According to Davidson, the decision to kill Andy led to various script changes as he claims that it had been the original plan for Andy to marry Angie Watts (Anita Dobson), whom he had a brief affair with on-screen. He also claimed that Andy would have left the nursing profession to run The Dagmar wine bar, which was instead given to a different character, James Willmott-Brown (William Boyde).

== Storylines ==
Nurse Andy O'Brien moves to Albert Square in March 1985 along with his girlfriend Debbie Wilkins (Shirley Cheriton). Andy and Debbie are decidedly 'middle class', in contrast to the working class locals who inhabit the Square. Andy and Debbie have a rocky relationship. Andy wants to settle down and start a family but Debbie is not so keen and she soon attracts the attention of policeman Roy Quick (Douglas Fielding). Debbie obviously enjoys being pursued by Roy so they agree to have an open relationship. The pair continue to live together, which is not ideal for Andy, as he still has feelings for Debbie and regularly gets jealous when he sees her with other men.

Andy wants to make a difference in Walford, so he occupies himself with altruistic activities, like campaigning against the demolition of the Square, and racism. When he discovers Mary Smith (Linda Davidson) is illiterate, he starts teaching her to read. This backfires when Mary decides that she is in love with him, forcing him to reject her advances. Mary is not impressed at all, and ends her reading lessons.

Andy later begins an affair with the alcoholic landlady of The Queen Victoria public house, Angie Watts (Anita Dobson). However, Angie's husband, Den (Leslie Grantham), catches them in bed together, and furiously chases a half-naked Andy into the street, which prompts a feud between the pair. It soon emerges that Angie is using Andy to make Den jealous, so their affair is short-lived and Andy soon regrets getting involved in their volatile relationship. Upon seeing that Andy is in such demand with the ladies, Debbie has a change of heart and she and Andy get back together and are soon engaged. Their happiness is short-lived as in 1986, 37-year-old Andy is mowed down by a lorry after running into the road to save a child from being hit. He is killed instantly. True to form, Andy is even altruistic in death, as his organ donor card ensures that someone gets his kidneys. Shortly before his death he has had an argument with Debbie which she finishes by telling him to "drop dead", which ironically, he does
