= Nicholas Berry =

Nicholas Berry may refer to:

- Nic Berry (born 1984), Australian rugby union player
- Nick Berry (born 1963), British actor and singer
- Nicholas Berry (Daily Mail), corporate director Daily Mail and General Trust
