= Simon Wicks =

Fictional character from EastEnders

- EastEnders character
- Portrayed by: Nick Berry
- Duration: 1985–1990, 2012
- First appearance: Episode 67; 8 October 1985
- Last appearance: Episode 4357; 13 January 2012
- Introduced by: Julia Smith (1985); Bryan Kirkwood (2012)
- Book appearances: Swings and Roundabouts; Heroes; Elbow Room
In-universe information
- Other names: Wicksy
- Occupation: Barman
- Family: Beale
- Father: Brian Wicks
- Mother: Pat Butcher
- Stepfather: Pete Beale; Frank Butcher; Roy Evans
- Half-brothers: David Wicks
- Wife: Miriam
- Sons: Steven Beale
- Granddaughters: AJ Branning
- Nephews: Joe Wicks
- Nieces: Bianca Jackson; Karen Wicks
- First cousins: Kevin Wicks
- Other relatives: Liam Butcher; Tiffany Butcher; Morgan Butcher

Simon "Wicksy" Wicks is a fictional character from the British BBC soap opera EastEnders, played by Nick Berry between 1985 and 1990. Wicksy was introduced to take on some of the more adult storylines that had been scripted for another character, Mark Fowler; Mark's actor, David Scarboro, had left the serial prematurely due to personal problems. Wicksy was the soap's first male pin-up.

An early storyline saw Wicksy perform a song in the serial, "Every Loser Wins", which was subsequently released as a single in 1986 and reached number one in the UK singles chart. One of Wicksy's most prominent storylines was his adultery with Cindy Beale (Michelle Collins), and a subsequent feud with Cindy's husband and Wicksy's thought-to-be brother, Ian Beale (Adam Woodyatt). Berry quit the role in 1990, fearful of typecasting, and after five years on-screen, Wicksy departed on 27 December that year. On 13 January 2012, Simon made a one-off cameo for the funeral of his mother, Pat Evans (Pam St Clement).

== Creation ==
Simon was introduced by creator and executive producer Julia Smith just after the show's inception in 1985, making his first appearance in October that year. According to Smith, Simon was thought up overnight as a means to restore the cast balance distorted by the unexpected departure from the serial of actor David Scarboro who played the original Mark Fowler (who would appear on and off until the actor's suicide in 1988). Scarboro's departure meant many of his functions as the slightly eldest of the young characters would need to be taken over by another character and thus Wicksy was invented.

Simon Wicks was associated with one of EastEnders' original families, the Beales. Specifically, he was introduced as the estranged son of Pete Beale (Peter Dean), born from his first marriage - events that had been written into Pete's backstory at the start of the programme. According to Smith, the producers and writers of the soap had always planned on introducing Pete's estranged son on-screen, but Wicksy's premature inclusion meant introducing him a year before it had originally been intended.

Actor Nick Berry was cast to play Wicksy with minimal delay. Smith has described his casting as one of the fastest on record. Berry auditioned in front of the soap's creators, Smith and Tony Holland, and was offered the part immediately. Berry was whisked into costume and make-up and given a new haircut, which Berry claimed was because the producers wanted to smarten his appearance up. Berry was already a fan of the soap at the time of his casting. He has told interviewer Dan Abramson, "I auditioned on a Wednesday and then on Friday I arrived in Albert Square and began shooting my first scenes with Dirty Den, whom I had enjoyed watching on the box for some time. For my first few episodes, I walked around with a big smile on my face, grinning at everybody. It was funny."

Wicksy has been described by writer Colin Brake as a major arrival during EastEnders' first year. The character drove into EastEnders in a bright yellow sports car in episode 67. He suggested that with Wicksy's arrival, Walford gained a new pin-up.

=== Characterisation ===
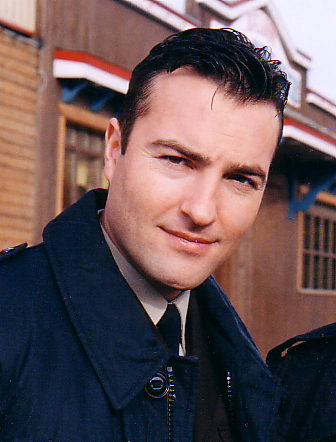
Portrayer of Simon Wicks, Nick Berry

Berry stated in 1986 that he modelled his portrayal of Simon on his younger brother, who was also called Simon. He commented, "he's already quite the ladies' man. He's extremely good-looking and is almost always the centre of attention wherever he goes."

Author Hilary Kingsley dubbed Wicksy in 1991 as Walford's "only sexy man". She added, "there is a cheekiness about Simon Wicks that's very attractive. In his early days he was happy-go-lucky, interested only in girls and paying off his debts [...] Simon put it about a bit". Kate Lock, author of EastEnders' official book, Who's who?, described Simon as a "smoothie and a charmer [...] shallow, lazy and unreliable." She suggested that he graduated from the "love 'em and leave 'em school of relationships" and that he could not cope with commitment. Additionally, author Rupert Smith has suggested that, "with his blow-dried hair, rolled-up jacket and toothy grin, [Wicksy] was the apotheosis of 80s manhood. He went through the women of Walford like a dose of salts, but at the end of the day slippery Simon was a bolter".

Discussing Wicksy's characterisation in 1993, Berry inferred that he was not entirely happy with the changes that producers attempted to introduce surrounding his character. Berry suggested that when Wicksy first arrived, he was "sort of the boy next door [...] But then they changed it. Dirty Den had left the show [in 1989] and they chose Wicksy as the new romantic lead. I resisted that change as I never really saw Wicksy like that and you have to be consistent with these characters."

== Development ==
=== The Banned ===
In 1986, EastEnders decided to tackle a storyline about the ups and downs of a pop group. The group featured the majority of teenage characters in the soap at the time, including Wicksy. Nick Berry was musically trained, having attended London stage schools. He was initially chosen as the group's solo singer, who named themselves "The Banned" after they were banned from the Queen Victoria public house.

The storyline proved to be a successful merchandising tool for the serial, as it spawned two hit singles in the "real world". Actor Nick Berry released a ballad entitled "Every Loser Wins" in October 1986, having previously sung the song in character on-screen (accompanied by a piano). The song was written and produced by Simon May, who famously composed the EastEnders theme tune. "Every Loser Wins" was a smash hit, reaching number 1 in the UK singles chart, where it stayed for three weeks, knocking Madonna's "True Blue" off the top spot. It was the second biggest-selling single in the UK that year after "Don't Leave Me This Way" by The Communards, and held the record as the highest climbing chart single ever until 2001, when it was eclipsed by "It's the Way You Make Me Feel" by Steps (which climbed from 72–2). "Every Loser Wins" sold over a million copies and earned composer Simon May an Ivor Novello award. The song "also provided levity" on-screen, when it was used as Lofty Holloway's break-up song after Michelle Fowler had jilted him at the altar. Although the plot produced two hit singles in the real world, the actual storyline was not a great success with viewers. EastEnders creators Julia Smith and Tony Holland both felt it lacked credibility and branded it an experiment that failed.

=== Paternity ===
1986 heralded the beginning of a storyline that Colin Brake has described as one of the soap's most complicated, convoluted, confusing and mind-boggling: The paternity of Simon Wicks. As part of the original storyline, Wicksy's mother, Pat (Pam St Clement), was introduced as a major antagonist for the Beale family, when she announced that her former husband, Pete, was not Simon's biological father, as had previously been claimed. So began a long-running storyline played out throughout the year and continuing into 1988, which included other characters being implemented as the potential father of Simon, including Pete's older brother Kenny Beale (Michael Attwell). In the on-screen events, Simon was shown to bond with Kenny, despite Pat's admitting that she did not know which of the Beale brothers had fathered Wicksy. A final plot twist in mid-1988 saw Pat finally reveal what she thought was the truth, that Simon's real father was Brian Wicks (Leslie Schofield), Pat's second husband and Wicksy's adoptive father.

Despite this revelation on-screen, Colin Brake stated in an official EastEnders' book in 1995 that the true parentage of Simon was still uncertain in the minds of the producers. He stated, "At various times over the years the story has been amended, until the only certainty is that we will never be certain about the actual facts." He added that, at the time of writing the book for EastEnders' 10th anniversary in 1994, "the current producers believe that Pete was the father of [Simon's older brother] David and may have been the father of Simon."

=== Love triangle ===
Another storyline featuring Wicksy was begun in 1988 with the on-screen arrival of a love-interest, Cindy Williams (Michelle Collins). In the storyline, Cindy had a fling with Wicksy before opting to have a more serious relationship with his friend, Ian Beale (Adam Woodyatt). Colin Brake suggested that with this storyline, EastEnders were sowing the seeds of a situation that would provide much story material for years to come. In the storyline, Cindy and Simon committed to relationships with other people, but remained drawn to each other, resulting in a one-night stand and Cindy falling pregnant with Simon's baby. In a further plot twist, Cindy, rejected by Simon, married Ian and appropriated him as the father of Steven Beale, Wicksy's baby. The love triangle continued into 1990, resulting in Cindy leaving Ian for Wicksy. The episode where Ian discovered that Simon was Cindy's other man was dubbed by the script department as "the Devon Cottage Climax" and aired in September 1990. Colin Brake hailed it as the best episode of EastEnders that year. Having set up the secret that Steven was Simon's son rather than Ian's, script writers devised a way in which to reveal this secret, and according to Brake, the entire love triange storyline built up to this climax. In the on-screen events, Wicksy spent time with Steven and Cindy at her parents' cottage in Devon, but the idyll was shattered by the arrival of Ian. In his description of the episode, Brake said, "the scene was set. Debbie Cook's scripts took Pete and Ian, with his leg in plaster, to Devon for a confrontation that would contain elements of tragedy and farce. Particularly memorable was Ian furiously throwing bricks through the window of the [cottgae], followed by one of his crutches. This episode ended ominously with Ian finding Cindy's father's shotgun and stealing it ... Directed by Matthew Evans, these episodes not only brought the story to a good climax but also laid the roots for the next three months' worth of stories, building up to Wicksy and Cindy's final exit."

=== Departure and brief return ===
After five years playing Wicksy Nick Berry quit the role in 1990 and the character was written out in December that year, Berry having been offered a lucrative deal with BBC's rival network, ITV. Berry has since suggested that he left the role as he feared being typecast.

When asked in interviews, Berry has refused to rule out a possible return to Eastenders. In 2001, Berry commented, "Well, they never did kill off Wicksy. Maybe one day, he'll make a dramatic return through the doors of the Queen Vic? Never say never - who knows when I'll need the work..."

Berry was reportedly asked to reprise the role of Simon in 2004 by executive producer Louise Berridge, though a return at this time did not materialise. In 2007, the executive producer of EastEnders, Diederick Santer, stated that Wicksy was the character he would most like to see return to the serial. He commented, "I'd love to see what he's like today. What is this golden boy, who had the world and the women of Walford at his feet, doing now? Has he delivered on his early promise? I loved Nick Berry playing him – Simon was a likeable but complex character. Maybe I should ask him to come back…" He confirmed his desire to get the character back to website Walford Web in 2010, but added that it was not to be; he did not state whether or not Berry had been approached.

On 13 January 2012, Berry made a brief one-off appearance in EastEnders during a scene that aired as part of the episode's end credits, filmed the previous day, and did not involve any other cast members. This depicted Simon laying flowers at his mother's grave at night, having arrived from New Zealand too late for the funeral, and saying "Bye, Mum" before walking off into the darkness. Berry was uncredited on-screen, despite having dialogue.

== Storylines ==
Simon arrives in Walford to see the man he believes to be his father, Pete Beale (Peter Dean). They have not seen each other for 10 years and Pete is pleased to see him. He quickly gets a job in The Queen Victoria public house and moves in. It is soon revealed that Simon had been in a band with Eddie Hunter (Simon Henderson) but Simon has borrowed money from loan sharks to keep the band afloat, but the band has fallen apart with Simon owing the loan sharks £1,500, which he cannot pay, and he has fled home after stealing from his mother, Pat Wicks (Pam St Clement). Pete pays off Simon's debt.

Simon attempts to form another band, but rivalry between the members prompts him to quit and go solo. He does not get very far however, and by the end of the year he gives up his dream of becoming a musician. Instead, Simon finds work as a barman in both The Queen Vic and later The Dagmar wine bar, where he frequently plays the pub piano, singing Cockney favourites to the regulars

Pat arrives in Walford, much to Pete's dismay, and tells Pete that he is not Simon's father. Pat had various affairs during their marriage, including one with Pete's brother Kenny Beale (Michael Attwell). This causes a rift between Simon and his mother, a relationship already damaged due to Simon's disapproval of her nonchalant style of parenting. Pat later admits that Simon's father is Brian Wicks (Leslie Schofield), his supposed adoptive father. Simon visits Brian following this revelation, but his father is abusive towards him and so Simon cuts contact.

Simon proves popular with women. He has flings with Donna Ludlow (Matilda Ziegler), Mary Smith (Linda Davidson) and Naima Jeffery (Shreela Ghosh) among others. In 1987, he dates Sharon Watts (Letitia Dean), but soon gets bored when she refuses to sleep with him. His first serious relationship is with caterer Magda Czajkowski (Kathryn Apanowicz). They move in together, but both want different things out of the relationship and Simon eventually jilts her in 1988 on the advice of his boss Den Watts (Leslie Grantham), whose womanising he idolises.

In 1988, Simon has flings with Donna and Cindy Williams (Michelle Collins) at the same time. Cindy refuses to tolerate Simon's womanising and when Ian Beale (Adam Woodyatt) starts wooing her, she dates him instead. Initially Cindy is only interested in making Simon jealous, but when she realises Ian is a budding entrepreneur, she agrees to marry him. Confused by Cindy, Simon reignites a relationship with Sharon. Jealous that Simon is moving on, Cindy seduces him and they have sex on the floor of The Queen Vic after closing time. This tryst culminates in Cindy falling pregnant with Simon's child. When Simon learns of the pregnancy, he refuses to have anything more to do with Cindy. Rejected, Cindy marries Ian and deceives him into thinking that her baby is his. She gives birth to Steven (Edward Farrell) on Boxing Day 1989.

Meanwhile, Simon and Sharon's relationship continues. Sharon makes plans to buy The Queen Vic and run it with Simon. However, Simon finds this commitment daunting; he starts pining for Cindy and develops paternal feelings towards his son. Simon and Cindy resume their affair and when Ian finds out, he becomes obsessed with breaking them up and ruining Simon's life. Simon is accused of theft from The Queen Vic when marked notes are found in his pocket; however, it is Ian who planted them. When Simon loses his job he accepts Ian's offer of employment at his catering company, where Ian attempts to frame him for theft. When this fails, Ian tries to kill Simon by sabotaging the brakes of the van he is driving on Christmas Day 1990. Realising that Ian will not stop the feud, Simon, Cindy and Steven leave Walford to start a new life together the following day.

In 1992, Cindy returns and reunites with Ian, stating Simon abandoned her and Steven to move abroad. Simon eventually settles in New Zealand and in 2002, Steven, who has so far been brought up by Ian, discovers his true paternity and moves to New Zealand to be with Simon. Simon's girlfriend Miriam becomes pregnant in 2009, but their relationship suffers in 2011 when Simon reveals to Pat that while staying with him, his half-brother, David Wicks (Michael French), had an affair with Miriam. When Pat dies of pancreatic cancer in January 2012, David claims Simon is unable to get a flight to attend her funeral; however, Simon later arrives at his mother's graveside, alone, laying flowers and saying goodbye. In 2014, Ian's son Peter (Ben Hardy) reveals that Steven is living in New Zealand with Simon after he plans to escape Walford after the murder of his sister Lucy (Hetti Bywater) (see Who Killed Lucy Beale?). The following year, Peter goes to visit Steven and Simon in New Zealand. Simon does not attend Steven's funeral in September 2017, after he is killed by Max Branning (Jake Wood).

== Reception ==
The character proved popular among fans and Berry became a teen pin-up during his tenure, winning Britain's sexiest man title in 1986. The single Berry released as part of a storyline in the soap reached number one in the charts and was the UK's second highest selling record that year. According to Hilary Kingsley, Berry received the most fan mail out of all the actors in the show.

Kevin O'Sullivan of the Sunday Mirror said that Simon was a "cockney hero". He said his return was a "blast from the distant EastEnders past" and branded it "another dumb stunt". In 2020, Sara Wallis and Ian Hyland from The Daily Mirror placed Simon 60th on their ranked list of the best EastEnders characters of all time.
