= Letitia Dean =

English actress (born 1967)

- Born: Letitia Jane Dean; 14 November 1967 (age 59); Potters Bar, Hertfordshire, England
- Occupation: Actress
- Years active: 1979–present
- Known for: Role of Sharon Watts in EastEnders
- Television: Grange Hill (1983–1984); Brookside (1984); EastEnders (1985–1995, 2001–2006, 2012–present); The Hello Girls (1996–1998); Lucy Sullivan Is Getting Married (1999–2000); Strictly Come Dancing (2007)
- Spouse: Jason Pethers (m. 2002; div. 2008)

Letitia Jane Dean (born 14 November 1967) is an English actress best known as Sharon Watts in EastEnders. An original cast member from 1985 to 1995, she reprised the role from 2001 to 2006 and again from 2012. For her portrayal of Sharon, she was awarded the British Soap Award for Outstanding Achievement in 2022.

Her other television roles include Grange Hill (1983–1984), Brookside (1984), The Hello Girls (1996–1998) and Lucy Sullivan Is Getting Married (1999–2000). In 2007, she participated in the fifth series of Strictly Come Dancing, finishing fourth. On stage, she starred in the West End production of High School Musical in 2008, and in the UK touring production of Calendar Girls in 2010.

== Early life ==
Letitia Jane Dean was born on 14 November 1967 in Potters Bar, Hertfordshire, to parents Leslie (a tailor) and Ellie Dean, in a cottage rented on the estate of English romantic novelist Barbara Cartland, known as Camfield Place. Dean has two older brothers.

Dean's family moved to the north Buckinghamshire village of Stoke Goldington near Newport Pagnell when she was three years old. She acquired a penchant for performing at an early age; both she and her older brother Stephen attended a local dance school, the Sylvia Mitchell School of Dance and they also performed a dance act together on stage. This later prompted Dean's successful application to attend the Italia Conti Academy of Theatre Arts at ten years old and later the Sylvia Young Theatre School in Marylebone, London.

== Career ==
=== Early career ===
Dean began performing professionally at the age of 12, when she was cast as Pepper in the musical Annie at London's Victoria Palace Theatre. A trained singer, she played the lead female, Sandy, in the musical Grease, and also sang with a rock group called The Young Uns, who toured the country supporting stage acts such as Bobby Davro and Tom O'Connor.

Between the ages of 13 and 17, Dean appeared in numerous television programmes, including: Love Story; Tales Out Of School; the Matthew Kelly sitcom Relative Strangers; Grange Hill, playing a student named Lucinda Oliver (credited as Titia Dean); and the role of Dawn in the Channel 4 soap opera Brookside.

=== EastEnders ===
In 1984, Dean auditioned to play one of the original characters in BBC One's new soap opera, EastEnders; she was selected for an interview on the strength of a photograph alone. The creators of EastEnders, Tony Holland and Julia Smith, were looking for a "bouncy, attractive, oddly vulnerable young woman" to play the part of Sharon Watts, and out of the various applicants they had seen, they believed that only Dean had all of those qualities. Dean lied about her roots to get the part. As the casting directors were only looking for real East End actors, she falsely claimed that she was born and brought up in Hackney, east London. The lie paid off and she got the part, clinching the deal because of her laugh, which Holland and Smith described as "the dirtiest in the world!" She debuted in the role in the show's first episode broadcast on 19 February 1985.

Dean's character Sharon, the troubled and spoilt adopted daughter of landlords "Dirty" Den (Leslie Grantham) and Angie Watts (Anita Dobson), has become one of the most popular and long-running characters in the serial. She featured in one of the soap's most popular storylines in 1994, a love triangle featuring Sharon, her husband Grant Mitchell (Ross Kemp) and his brother Phil (Steve McFadden). The plot, nicknamed "Sharongate", gave the soap one of its highest episode ratings in October 1994 with over 25.3 million viewers. A desire to pursue other acting roles prompted Dean to leave the soap in 1995.

During her first stint on EastEnders, she forayed into singing with her fellow EastEnders castmate, Paul J. Medford (who played Kelvin Carpenter). A song penned for the pair as part of a plotline in EastEnders (known as The Banned) prompted the BBC to release the song as a single. The song, "Something Outa Nothing", reached number 12 in the UK singles chart in November 1986.

Six years following her initial exit, Dean was lured back to EastEnders by producer John Yorke, reprising the role of Sharon from 2001 to 2006. In December 2004, Sunday Mirror reported that executive producer Kathleen Hutchison offered to double Dean's salary from £150,000 a year to £300,000 a year, to persuade her to remain in the show, making her one of the highest paid actresses in British soap. Dean's character left the serial again in January 2006. Her exit was announced in August 2005 and an official EastEnders press report initially stated that she was only taking a scheduled break and was due back on set later in 2006; however, this did not happen, and in June 2006 the BBC denied press speculation that there were any immediate plans for her to return to the series.

In February 2012, producer Bryan Kirkwood announced that Dean would make a second return to EastEnders, having been absent for a period of six years. She made her return on 13 August 2012 after fleeing from her wedding to her fiancé John Hewland, with her son, Dennis Rickman Jr. and Phil Mitchell. She is one of four remaining original cast members, along with Gillian Taylforth, Adam Woodyatt and Michelle Collins (returning from the dead as Cindy) in 2025. Most recently, Dean was on hiatus from the soap from October 2025 to May 2026 when she returned for a few episodes; she returned to screens full-time in June.

=== Other work ===
Away from EastEnders Dean has had various theatre and television roles. She starred in two seasons of the BBC drama The Hello Girls, set in a Derby telephone exchange in the 1960s; medical dramas Casualty and Doctors; the ITV police drama The Bill; romantic comedy Lucy Sullivan Is Getting Married, and the Channel 4 sitcom Drop the Dead Donkey as a weathergirl. She also starred in the 1995 film England, My England, which told the story of the musician and court composer Henry Purcell.

On stage, she starred as Nurse Fay in the Joe Orton comedy play, Loot, working alongside actor Michael Elphick. She also played a prostitute in the revival of Charles Dyer's 1960s play Rattle of a Simple Man at the Alexandra Theatre, Birmingham.

In 2007, Dean participated in the fifth series of the BBC celebrity dance contest, Strictly Come Dancing. She was partnered with the professional dancer, Darren Bennett. Dean and Bennett were voted out in the quarter-finals (week 10), one week before the semi-final. Commenting on her experience, Dean said "It's been incredible. I've got to thank [Darren Bennett] for all his patience, hard work, all the injuries. It's been wonderful." Dean was one of several celebrities who took part in the 2008 Strictly Come Dancing UK arena tour. The tour began in January 2008 and visited various venues throughout the UK, with all the proceeds going to the Children in Need appeal.

In April 2008, it was announced that she would be starring in the stage show High School Musical as Ms Darbus. Dean commented, "It's a lovely opportunity for me [...] It's something completely different to anything I've ever done – doing an American accent and playing this kind of character." The production played at London's Hammersmith Apollo from June 2008 until 31 August 2008.

In January 2009, Dean released a fitness DVD entitled Letitia Dean's Lean Routine. She joined the cast of the stage production of Calendar Girls the same year, playing Cora (Miss July).

==== Pantomimes ====
As well as television and theatre work, Dean regularly appears in seasonal pantomimes; she was reported to have a special clause in her EastEnders contract that permits her time off from filming to star in a pantomime each year. In 2001, she starred in Snow White at the Orchard in Dartford; and in 2004, she starred in Jack and the Beanstalk at the Birmingham Hippodrome, alongside British comedians Joe Pasquale and Don Maclean. In 2006, Dean appeared as the wicked witch in Snow White and the Seven Dwarfs at the Deco, Northampton, taking over the role from her EastEnders co-star, Gillian Taylforth, who pulled out due to ill health. December 2007 saw her appear as the Fairy godmother in Cinderella, at the Regent Theatre, Ipswich. In December 2008, she appeared as the Wicked Queen in Snow White and the Seven Dwarfs at the Grove Theatre in Dunstable, and she played the role again at the Ashcroft Theatre in Croydon in 2009.

=== Awards ===
In 2004, Dean was nominated for Best Actress and Best Dramatic Performance at the British Soap Awards. At the 2005 Inside Soap awards, she was presented with the award for outstanding achievement as homage to her work in EastEnders. She was also nominated in the category of Best Couple (shared with Nigel Harman). In 2022, Dean won the Outstanding Achievement award at the British Soap Awards.

== Personal life ==
Growing up in the public eye was reportedly hard for Dean and the constant media attention on her appearance was something she found especially tough. Dean says her self-confidence was damaged during this time, and this, as well as back pain, contributed to her decision to get a breast reduction in her teens. By her 30s, she considered herself to be a lot more comfortable in her own skin, and far more relaxed about public interest than she used to be as a teenager, commenting: "I have stopped pleasing people – and I'm calmer and more self assured than I've ever been."

In 2001, Dean became engaged to jobbing actor Jason Pethers after knowing him for only a few months. They married in September 2002 at All Saints' Church in Marylebone. Her close friend and EastEnders co-star, Susan Tully, was a bridesmaid at the wedding. Many of Dean's fellow castmates from EastEnders attended the wedding. After five years of marriage, it was announced in 2007 that Dean and Pethers had separated because Pethers was reluctant to have children.

As well as acting, Dean is a keen singer (with a mezzo-soprano voice) and tap dancer. She currently lives in the Bedfordshire village of Wootton.

In June 2022, when accepting an award at the British Soap Awards, she revealed that her father had died and she dedicated the award to him.

=== Charity work ===
In 1997, Dean, along with Susan Tully, was involved with the Third World charity Plan International; they were sent to a remote village in Senegal to help highlight one of the organisation's aid projects, designed to bring running water to drought-hit areas.

== Filmography ==
=== Film ===
Year	Title	Role
1988	Children's Royal Variety Performance	Herself
1990	Happy Birthday, Coronation Street!	Herself
1995	England, My England	Barbara Palmer
1995	The Trev & Simon Summer Special	Herself
1998	EastEnders: The Mitchells - Naked Truths	Sharon Watts
2003	EastEnders: Slaters in Detention	Sharon Watts
2008	Strictly Come Dancing: The Live Tour	Herself
2008	Lean Routine	Herself
2009	Donny & Marie: Las Vegas Live	Herself
2011	EastEnders: Greatest Exits	Sharon Watts
2015	EastEnders: Backstage with Zoe Ball & Joe Swash	Herself
2016	EastEnders: Last Orders	Sharon Watts
2016	Bobby Beale: The Story So Far	Sharon Watts
2016	When Celebrities Go Pop	Herself
2018	The Best of EastEnders	Sharon Watts
2022	'Allo 'Allo! Forty Years of Laughter	Sharon Watts

=== Television ===
Year	Title	Role	Notes
1984	Grange Hill	Lucinda Oliver	Episode: "Series 7, episode 11"
1984	Brookside	Dawn	2 episodes
1985	Relative Strangers	Lucy	Episode: "Series 1, episode 2"
1985–1995, 2001–2006, 2012–present	EastEnders	Sharon Watts	Regular role
1987	First Class	Herself	Episode: "Celebrity First Class 1987"
1987	Splash	Herself	Episode: "School for Stars"
1987	The English Programme	Herself	Episode: "Understanding Television 2: Guidelines"
1988-1989	Going Live!	Herself	2 episodes
1988, 1991	Wogan	Herself	2 episodes
1989	The Noel Edmonds Saturday Roadshow	Herself	2 episodes
1990	You Bet!	Herself	Episode: "Series 3, episode 6"
1993	Dimensions in Time	Sharon Watts	Charity crossover between Doctor Who and EastEnders
1993	Live & Kicking	Herself	Episode: "Series 1, episode 11"
1995	Casualty	Hannah Chesney	Episode: "Hit and Run"
1995, 1998, 2002	This Is Your Life	Herself	3 episodes
1996, 1998	The Hello Girls	Chris Cross	Regular role, 15 episodes
1997	The Bill	Amanda Ronson	Episode: "Playing with Fire"
1998	Drop the Dead Donkey	Melissa Cabriolet	Episode: "Beasts, Badgers and Bombshells"
1999-2000	Lucy Sullivan Is Getting Married	Charlotte	Regular role, 16 episodes
2000	Doctors	Marie Pearce	Episode: "Double Trouble"
2001	Top Ten	Herself	Episode: "Sex Bombs"
2001, 2004	Richard & Judy	Herself	2 episodes
2001, 2004, 2022	The British Soap Awards	Herself	2 episodes
2003, 2005	EastEnders Revealed	Herself	2 episodes
2005	This Morning	Herself	Episode: "9 September 2005"
2007	Just the Two of Us	Herself	Episode: "Series 2, episode 1"
2007	The Paul O'Grady Show	Herself	Episode: "Series 7, episode 23"
2007	Strictly Come Dancing: It Takes Two	Herself	9 episodes
2007	Strictly Come Dancing	Herself	Regular role, 21 episodes
2007	Screenwipe	Herself	Episode: "Review of the Year 2007"
2007-2008, 2015	The Graham Norton Show	Herself	3 episodes
2008	London Tonight	Herself	Episode: "15 February 2008"
2008	GMTV	Herself	Episode: "4 May 2008"
2008	Breakfast	Herself	Episode: "8 July 2008"
2008, 2014-2015	The One Show	Herself	2 episodes
2008, 2014-2015	The One Show	Sharon Watts	Episode: "Peggy Mitchell Special"
2009	Saturday Kitchen		Episode: "17 January 2009"
2009	The Alan Titchmarsh Show		Episode: "2 February 2009"
2009	Loose Women		2 episodes
2012	ITV News		Episode: "7 December 2012"
2013, 2018	Children in Need	Sharon Watts	2 episodes
2017	Antiques Roadshow	Herself	Episode: "Entertainment Special"
2020	EastEnders: Secrets from the Square	Herself	2 episodes
2020	EastEnders: Secrets from the Square	Sharon Watts	Episode: "Kathy and Ian"
2020	The Noughties	Sharon Watts	Episode: "2003"
2021	What We Were Watching	Sharon Watts	Episode: "Christmas 1991"
2023	The National Television Awards	Herself	Episode: "2023"
2025	EastEnders: 40 Years on the Square	Herself	Interviewed guest

== Theatre ==
Year	Title	Role	Notes
1979	Annie	Pepper	Victoria Palace Theatre
1986-1987	Dick Whittington	Alice Fitzwarren	Hexagon Theatre, Reading
1987-1988	Dick Whittington	Alice Fitzwarren	Lewisham Theatre, London
1993-1994	Snow White and the Seven Dwarfs	Snow White	Royal & Derngate, Northampton
1995-1996	Snow White and the Seven Dwarfs	Snow White	Liverpool Empire
1997	Rattle of a Simple Man	Cyrenne	UK National Tour
1997-1998	Jack and the Beanstalk	Jack	The Gatehouse Theatre, Stafford
1999	Loot	Nurse Fay	UK National Tour
2001-2002	Snow White and the Seven Dwarfs	Wicked Queen	Orchard Theatre, Dartford
2004-2005	Jack and the Beanstalk	Fairy	Birmingham Hippodrome
2006-2007	Snow White and the Seven Dwarfs	Wicked Queen	The Deco Northampton
2007-2008	Cinderella	Fairy Godmother	Ipswich Regent
2008	High School Musical	Ms. Darbus	Hammersmith Apollo, London
2008-2009	Cinderella	Fairy Godmother	Regent Theatre, Ipswich
2009-2010	Snow White and the Seven Dwarfs	Wicked Queen	Fairfield Halls, Croydon
2010	Calendar Girls	Cora	UK Tour
