= Every Loser Wins =

Single by Nick Berry

from the album Nick Berry
- B-side: "Instrumental version"
- Released: 22 September 1986
- Genre: Pop
- Length: 3:11
- Label: BBC
- Songwriters: Simon May; Stewart James; Bradley James
- Producers: Simon May; Stewart James; Bradley James

Nick Berry singles chronology
"Every Loser Wins" (1986)	"Heartbeat" (1992)

"Every Loser Wins" is a 1986 song performed by English actor and singer Nick Berry. Written and produced by Simon May, Stewart James and Bradley James, the song was heavily featured in the BBC soap opera EastEnders throughout the summer of 1986, sung by Berry's character Simon "Wicksy" Wicks.

When released on 22 September 1986 as a single, "Every Loser Wins" spent three weeks at number one on the UK singles chart in October and November 1986. It was the second biggest-selling single in the UK that year, after "Don't Leave Me This Way" by the Communards. The song's three composers each received an Ivor Novello Award for it.

"Every Loser Wins" peaked at number 93 on the Australia Kent Music Report in 1987.

== The song in EastEnders ==
Simon first plays "Every Loser Wins" in episode 165 of EastEnders after leaving the Banned, performing it alone on a piano in the Queen Victoria pub. In the next episode, he plays it to Michelle Fowler (Susan Tully) and Lofty Holloway (Tom Watt) and they record it onto a cassette. In the next episode, Michelle and Lofty tell Simon it is "their song". In episode 170, Lofty listens to it on loop after Michelle jilts him at their wedding. In episode 172, Simon has a sing-along in the Vic and Ian Beale requests "Every Loser Wins", which Simon plays but Lofty walks out because of the memories it brings. Simon performs it again in episode 175, causing Michelle to cry and Mary Smith (Linda Davidson) calls it "sentimental garbage" and Harry Reynolds (Gareth Potter) calls it "music to vomit to", causing a fight between Simon and Harry.
