= Nick Berry =

English actor (born 1963)

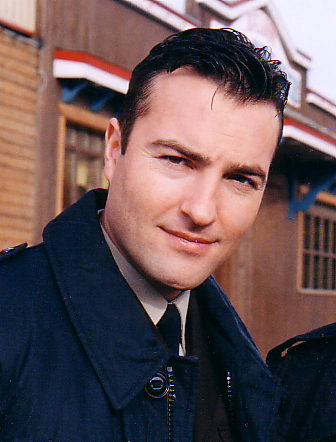
- Nick Berry as Nick Rowan, in Cochrane, Alberta, 1998
- Born: Nicholas Berry; 16 April 1963 (age 63); Woodford, Essex, England
- Occupations: Actor; singer
- Years active: 1976; 1983–2003; 2012
- Spouse: Rachel Robertson (m. 1994)
- Children: 2

Nicholas Berry (born 16 April 1963) is an English retired actor and pop singer. He is best known for his roles as Simon Wicks in EastEnders (1985–1990), and as PC (later Sgt) Nick Rowan in Heartbeat (1992–1998). He sang UK chart singles with "Every Loser Wins" in 1986, which went to number one, and the theme song from Heartbeat, a cover of the Buddy Holly song "Heartbeat", in 1992.

== Early life ==
Berry started acting at the age of eight, and attended the Sylvia Young Theatre School in London.

== Career ==
Berry played minor parts on television, film and stage, until his big break playing Simon 'Wicksy' Wicks in the BBC soap opera EastEnders, joining the series shortly after its inception in 1985 and staying until the end of 1990. Berry's character was thought up overnight and had been scheduled to appear later. However, he was introduced to restore the cast balance distorted by the unexpected departure of actor David Scarboro who played the original Mark Fowler. Scarboro's departure meant many of his functions as one of the senior of the young characters would need to be taken over by another character and thus Wicksy was introduced rather sooner than originally planned and Berry was cast with minimal delay. He was quickly hailed as EastEnders' top pin-up and during this time was besieged by fan mail from female admirers.

Berry soon took a break from EastEnders to tour and make an album from which the number-one single "Every Loser Wins" came in 1986. The song was heavily featured within EastEnders in a plotline referred to as The Banned in which the youths of Albert Square formed a pop group and performed the songs on screen. It was the second-biggest-selling single in the UK that year, remaining at number one for three weeks. Its composers, Simon May, Stewart James and Bradley James, received an Ivor Novello Award.

Berry returned to EastEnders after his musical career stalled but left again in an 'open to return' storyline which was aired in December 1990. His character has made only one brief re-appearance since, in an episode dated 13 January 2012, marking the funeral of his on-screen mother, played by Pam St Clement.

In 1992, Berry was cast in the role of policeman PC (later Sgt) Nick Rowan in ITV's drama series Heartbeat (1992–98). Berry recorded the title song "Heartbeat" in 1992, a cover of the 1958 Buddy Holly hit, which reached number two in the UK singles chart and spawned a second album. His wife Rachel Robertson also appeared in the series in small one-off roles. Berry's era ended with a one-off twin episode special showing his character's new career as a Royal Canadian Mounted Police Officer.

In 1998, Berry left Heartbeat for the BBC One series Harbour Lights. Filmed around the area of Bridport he played harbourmaster Mike Nicholls, which ran for two series.

Berry's other credits include The Mystery of Men with Neil Pearson and Warren Clarke, Respect, Paparazzo, "Duck Patrol", The Black Velvet Band with Todd Carty, and playing the police officer Liam Ketman alongside Stephen Tompkinson in the BBC crime drama In Deep.

Berry retired from acting and ran his own production company called Valentine Productions. Berry resigned from the company in October 2019.

== Personal life ==
Just before he joined the cast of EastEnders, Berry fractured his skull in a car crash but went on to make a full recovery.

During his time in EastEnders, Berry was in a relationship with fellow cast member Gillian Taylforth, who played Kathy Beale.

Berry married actress Rachel Robertson in 1994. The couple have two sons.

Berry is a supporter of West Ham United F.C.

== Filmography ==
=== Films ===
Year	Film	Role	Notes
1983	Forever Young	Boy at school	
1983	Party Party	Ralph	
1989	Tank Malling	Joe McGrath	
1995	Paparazzo	Rick Caulker	

=== TV ===
Year	Show	Role	Notes
1976	BBC2 Playhouse	Carter	1 episode: Kites
1983	Dramarama	Lance Boyle	1 episode: Rip It Up
1984	Dramarama	Paul Walker	1 episode: The Purple People Eater
1984	The Box of Delights	Pirate Rat	2 episodes: Where Shall the 'Knighted Showman Go? In Darkest Cellars Underneath
1985	Cover Her Face	Tony	1 episode: 1.2
1985–1990, 2012	EastEnders	Simon Wicks	Series regular: 466 episodes
1991	Cluedo	Ben the Window-Cleaner	1 episode: Charity Begins at Home
1992–1998	Heartbeat	Nick Rowan	Series regular: 96 episodes
1996	Respect	Bobby Carr	
1997	Black Velvet Band	Martin Tusco	
1998	Heartbeat: Changing Places	Nick Rowan	Spin-off video
1999	The Mystery of Men	Colin Dunbar	
1999–2000	Harbour Lights	Lt. Cmdr. Mike Nicholls	Series regular: 16 episodes
2001–2003	In Deep	Liam Ketman	Series regular: 22 episodes

== Discography ==
=== Albums ===
Year	Album details	Peak chart positions
Year	Album details	UK
1986	Nick Berry: Debut studio album; Released: 1 December 1986; Formats: LP, Cassette	99
1992	Nick Berry: Second studio album; Released: 9 November 1992; Formats: CD, Cassette	28

* The two identically titled albums are different.

=== Singles ===
Year	Single details	Peak chart positions			Album
Year	Single details	UK	AUS	IRE	Album
1986	"Every Loser Wins": Released: 13 October 1986	1	93	—	Nick Berry
1987	"It Seemed Like a Good Idea at the Time": Released: March 1987				Nick Berry
1992	"Heartbeat": Released: 1 June 1992	2	—	18	Nick Berry (1992)
1992	"Long Live Love": Released: 19 October 1992	47	—	—	Nick Berry (1992)
