= Adam Woodyatt =

English actor (born 1968)

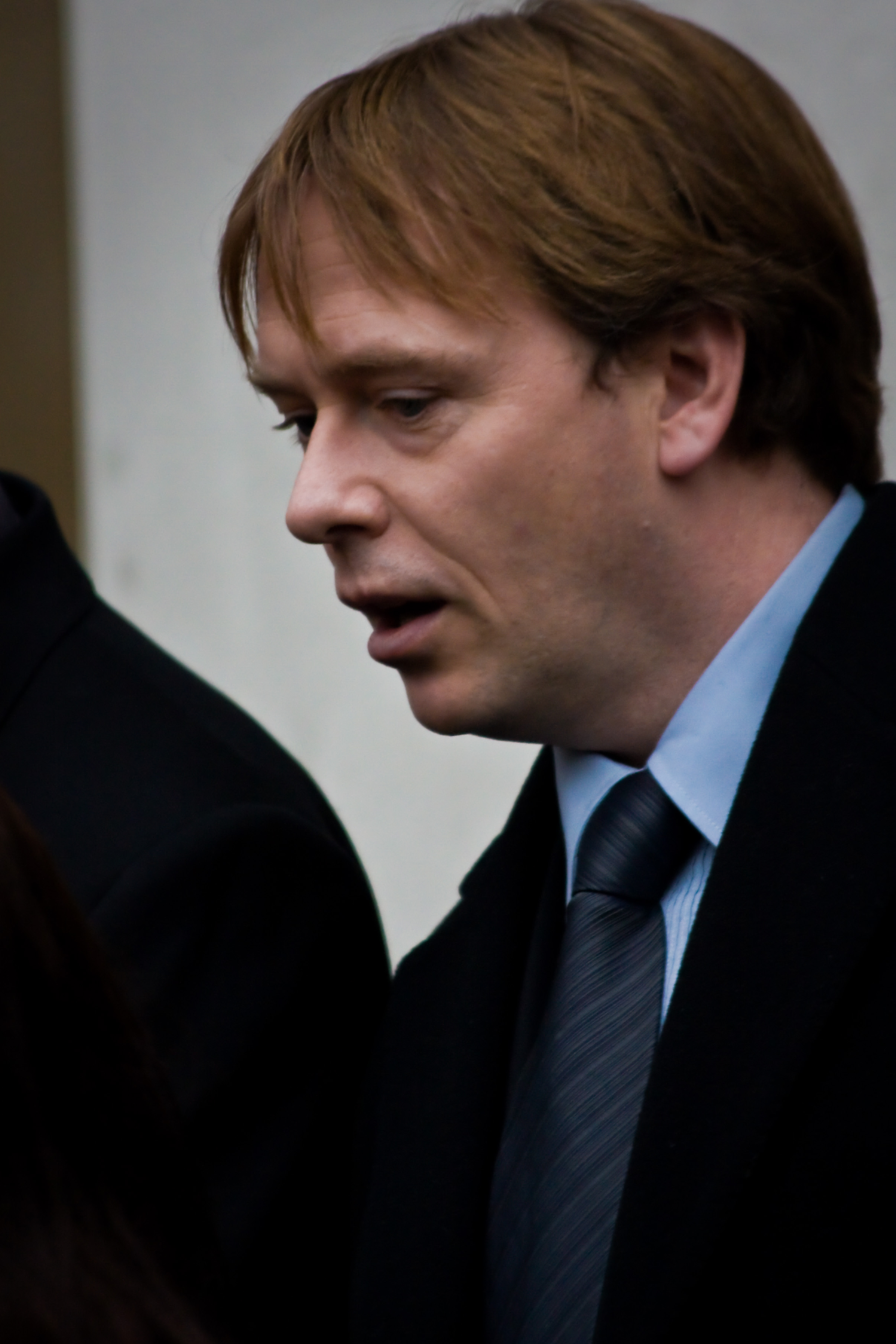
- Woodyatt in 2009
- Born: Adam Brinley Woodyatt; 28 June 1968 (age 58); Walthamstow, London, England
- Occupation: Actor
- Years active: 1983–present
- Spouse: Beverley Sharp (m. 1998; div. 2022)
- Children: 2

Adam Brinley Woodyatt (born 28 June 1968) is an English actor. He is known for his role as Ian Beale in the BBC soap opera EastEnders, a role he has portrayed since the show's inception in 1985, making him the serial's longest-serving regular cast member.

== Early life and education ==
Woodyatt was born on 28 June 1968 in Walthamstow, and grew up in east London. He was educated at two independent schools: Forest School, on the edge of Epping Forest, in Walthamstow in north east London, where he shared classes with comedy writer Sharat Sardana and cricket captain Nasser Hussain; and the Sylvia Young Theatre School. He also attended Llanidloes High School in Llanidloes.

== Career ==
Aged 13, Woodyatt appeared on stage at the National Theatre in Tom Stoppard's play On the Razzle. Following the completion of his studies at the Sylvia Young Theatre School, Woodyatt appeared in the BBC's children's drama series The Baker Street Boys and the ITV fantasy series The Witches and the Grinnygog, both airing in 1983. He then put his acting career on hiatus and worked as a butcher in Wales for a brief period, before joining the cast of BBC soap opera EastEnders in the role of Ian Beale. Woodyatt has since become the longest-serving regular cast member in EastEnders. In 2013, his longevity on the show was honoured at the British Soap Awards, where he received the Lifetime Achievement Award.

Woodyatt has also appeared as a guest personality on several BBC game shows and charity fundraisers, including A Question of Sport, Children in Need and Robot Wars, where he won a celebrity special. In 2015, Woodyatt played the henchman of the Wicked Queen in a pantomime production of Snow White at Swindon's Wyvern Theatre. Speaking about joining the production, Woodyatt commented: "I absolutely love performing in front of an audience as it's so different to camera – I love the reaction of the audience. I am very much looking forward to spending the Christmas season at the Wyvern Theatre, which I know has a reputation for staging outstanding pantomimes." In 2019, he appeared on Celebrity Masterchef.

In late 2020, it was announced Woodyatt would be taking an "extended break" from appearing in EastEnders. He initially stated he had no plans to return to the serial, wanting to pursue other projects. These included being one of two late entrants during the twenty-first series of I'm a Celebrity...Get Me Out of Here!, entering alongside Coronation Street actor Simon Gregson. He was the sixth campmate to be eliminated, ultimately finishing in sixth place. He also appeared in stage productions including Looking Good Dead and My Fair Lady. In December 2022, he made a brief return to EastEnders for the on-screen funeral of Dot Cotton (June Brown). He later returned on a permanent basis the following year, alongside the character's ex-wife, Cindy Beale (Michelle Collins), who was supposedly killed off 25 years prior.

== Personal life ==
On 8 April 1998, Woodyatt married dancer Beverley Sharp in a private ceremony at Disney World, Florida. The couple have two children. For many years, the family lived in Southam, Warwickshire, some 72 miles northwest of the BBC Elstree Studios in south Hertfordshire, where EastEnders is recorded. On 21 August 2020, it was reported that Woodyatt had decided to separate from Sharp the previous year, after more than twenty years of marriage.

Woodyatt is a supporter of Liverpool F.C. and has been described by Digital Spy as a "huge sci-fi fanatic". Woodyatt is also a photographer, a hobby he took up while performing On The Razzle at the National Theatre when he was 13 years old. In 2008, he won the Architectural Photographer of the Year Award of The Societies of Photographers with a picture he took at St Pancras, where he was filming EastEnders.

=== Charity ===
Inspired by his father's death from cancer aged 58, Woodyatt has helped raise money for various cancer research initiatives, and broke his collarbone in June 2003 whilst training for a charity bicycle ride.

Woodyatt was also involved in launching an Aid for Haiti event at Coventry's Ricoh Arena in February 2010, with many of his actor colleagues posing for photographs, signing autographs, and providing items for an auction, which raised £30,000. Woodyatt is also a supporter of Warwickshire & Northamptonshire Air Ambulance and an Ambassador for the Children's Air Ambulance.

In January 2019, it was announced that he would be running the London Marathon with some of his EastEnders co-stars for a Dementia campaign in honour of former Eastenders actress Barbara Windsor.

== Filmography ==
=== Film ===
Year	Title	Role
1990	Happy Birthday, Coronation Street!	Himself
1998	Reasonably Scary Monsters	Himself
1999	An Audience with Tom Jones	Himself
2000	A Question of EastEnders	Himself
2001	An Audience with Des O'Connor	Himself
2001	Wendy Richard: A Life on the Box	Himself
2002	Test the Nation: The National IQ Test 2002	Himself
2003	EastEnders: Slaters in Detention	Ian Beale
2003	Test the Nation: The National Relationship Test	Himself
2004	How Soaps Changed the World	Himself
2007	EastEnders Feuds: The Beales vs. The Mitchells	Himself
2008	Happy Birthday Brucie!	Himself
2009	The British Soap Awards 2009: After Party	Himself
2009	Donny & Marie: Las Vegas Live	Himself
2010	Coronation Street: The Big 50	Himself
2010	EastEnders: Last Tango in Walford	Ian Beale
2011	EastEnders: Greatest Exits	Ian Beale
2012	The Walford Apprentice	Ian Beale
2014	The Ghosts of Ian Beale	Ian Beale
2015	EastEnders: Backstage with Zoe Ball & Joe Swash	Himself
2015	Neighbours 30th Anniversary Tribute: Ramsay Square	Ian Beale
2016	Bobby Beale: The Story So Far	Ian Beale
2017	June Brown at 90: A Walford Legend	Himself
2018	The Best of EastEnders	Himself
2022	'Allo 'Allo! Forty Years of Laughter	Ian Beale
2022	Queens for the Night	Himself

=== Television ===
Year	Title	Role	Notes
1983	The Baker Street Boys	Shiner	8 episodes
1983	The Witches and the Grinnygog	Dave Firkettle	6 episodes
1985–present	EastEnders	Ian Beale	Regular role
1987	First Class	Himself	Episode: "Celebrity First Class 1987"
1988–1989, 1992	Going Live!	Himself	3 episodes
1990–1991	Motormouth	Himself	2 episodes
1991	Family Fortunes	Himself	Episode: "Series 11, episode 5"
1992, 1994	Noel's House Party	Himself	2 episodes
1993	The Main Event	Himself	Episode: "Series 1, episode 4"
1993	Dimensions in Time	Ian Beale	Charity crossover between Doctor Who and EastEnders
1994	You Bet!	Himself	2 episodes
1994	Live & Kicking	Himself	Episode: "Series 2, episode 11"
1995	The James Whale Show	Himself	Episode: "Series 1, episode 35"
1995–1996	That's Showbusiness	Himself	2 episodes
1998	Computers Don't Byte: The Beginner's Guide	Himself	Episode: "Series 2, episode 1"
1998, 2000, 2003	This Is Your Life	Himself	4 episodes
1999	EastEnders: Fighting Fit	Himself	5 episodes
1999	The Other Half	Himself	Episode: "Celebrity Special"
2000	Robot Wars	Himself	Episode: "Celebrity Robot Wars"
2000–2001	Auntie's Bloomers	Ian Beale	2 episodes
2000–2001, 2010	The Weakest Link	Himself	3 episodes
2001	The Generation Game	Himself	Episode: "Series 22, episode 15"
2001	Celebrity Ready, Steady, Cook	Himself	Episode: "6 May 2001"
2001	A Question of TV	Himself	2 episodes
2001	The Big Impression	Ian Beale	Episode: "Christmas Special 2001"
2002	The Kumars at No. 42	Himself	Episode: "Series 2, episode 4"
2002, 2008–2009	EastEnders Revealed	Himself	5 episodes
2003	A Question of Sport	Himself	Episode: "Series 32, episode 29"
2003, 2011, 2023	Children in Need	Ian Beale	2 episodes
2003, 2011, 2023	Children in Need	Freddie Mercury	Episode: "2011"
2003, 2011, 2023	Children in Need	Bet Lynch	Episode: "2011"
2003–2004	EastEnders: Christmas Party	Himself	2 episodes
2004	Celebrity Mastermind	Himself	Episode: "2004 Episode 3"
2004	They Think It's All Over	Himself	Episode: "Series 18, episode 1"
2005	Dick & Dom in da Bungalow	Himself	Episode: "Series 5, episode 15"
2005	Strictly Come Dancing: It Takes Two	Himself	Episode: "Series 2, episode 25"
2005, 2014	Strictly Come Dancing	Himself	2 episodes
2006	Charlie Brooker's Screenwipe	Ian Beale	Episode: "Series 2, episode 1"
2006	School's Out	Himself	Episode: "Series 1, episode 2"
2007	Would I Lie to You?	Ian Beale	Episode: "Series 1, episode 2"
2007	Would I Lie to You?	Himself	Episode: "Series 10, episode 8"
2007	Doctor Who Confidential	Himself	Episode: "Meet Martha Jones"
2007, 2009, 2013–2016	The British Soap Awards	Himself	6 episodes
2008	The Podge and Rodge Show	Himself	Episode: "Series 4, episode 18"
2009	The 4th TV Now Awards	Himself	Episode: "2009"
2010	EastEnders: The Greatest Cliffhangers	Himself	Episode: "Series 1, episode 2"
2010	EastEnders: The Greatest Cliffhangers	Ian Beale	Episode: "Series 1, episode 2"
2010	EastEnders: E20	Ian Beale	
2010	Dancing on Ice	Himself	Episode: "Series 5, episode 2"
2010, 2023	Breakfast	Himself	2 episodes
2010, 2015, 2023–2024	National Television Awards	Himself	2 episodes
2011	24 Hour Panel People	Himself	Episode: "Series 1, episode 5"
2015	Gogglebox	Ian Beale	Episode: "Series 5, episode 2"
2015	EastEnders: Back to Ours	Himself	Episode: "Adam Woodyatt & Laurie Brett"
2015	The Graham Norton Show	Himself	Episode: "EastEnders Special"
2016	British Academy Television Awards	Himself	Episode: "2016"
2016, 2020	The One Show	Ian Beale	Episode: "Peggy Mitchell Special"
2016, 2020	The One Show	Himself	Episode: "17 February 2020"
2017	All Round to Mrs. Brown's	Himself	Episode: "Series 1, episode 2"
2017	James Martin's Saturday Morning	Himself	Episode: "At Christmas – Adam Woodyatt & Paul Rankin"
2017–2018	Sunday Brunch	Himself	2 episodes
2017, 2023	Good Morning Britain	Himself	2 episodes
2018	Loose Women	Himself	Episode: "Series 23, episode 30"
2018, 2021	This Morning	Ian Beale	Episode: "Series 30, episode 237"
2018, 2021	This Morning	Himself	2 episodes
2019	Lorraine	Himself	Episode: "16 January 2019"
2019	Celebrity Masterchef	Himself	Episode: "Series 14, episode 10"
2020	EastEnders: Secrets from the Square	Ian Beale	2 episodes
2020	EastEnders: Secrets from the Square	Himself	2 episodes
2020	The Noughties	Ian Beale	2 episodes
2020	What We Were Watching	Ian Beale	Episode: "Christmas 1995"
2021	I'm a Celebrity... Get Me Out of Here!	Himself	Regular role, 16 episodes
2024	Tracey: A Day in the Life	Ian Beale	1 episode
2025	Bridge of Lies	Himself	1 episode; EastEnders special
2025	EastEnders: 40 Years on the Square	Himself	Interviewed guest

== Stage ==
- Aladdin
- Mother Goose
- Cinderella
- Oliver
- Snow White and the Seven Dwarfs
- Looking Good Dead (2021–2022)
- My Fair Lady (2022–2023)
