= List of EastEnders characters introduced in 1992 =

EastEnders logo

The following is a list of characters that first appeared in the BBC soap opera EastEnders in 1992, by order of first appearance.

== Christine Hewitt ==
Christine Hewitt, played by Elizabeth Power, is introduced in 1992 as a lonely divorcée who becomes besotted with married Arthur Fowler (Bill Treacher) while he tends her garden. She leaves in 1993 once her affair with Arthur is discovered by his wife Pauline Fowler (Wendy Richard). Liz Power was offered the role by one of the programme's producers, Leonard Lewis, for whom she'd worked with previously on Juliet Bravo and Softly, Softly. She has commented "I got a call out of the blue asking if I could go up to the BBC at Elstree to meet him. Mrs Hewitt was going to be in five episodes and I thought, 'wonderful'." Mrs Hewitt makes her first appearance on-screen in February 1992, as a lonely divorcee who employs the long-running character, Arthur Fowler, to tend to her garden—used as a plot device to rebuild Arthur's relationship with his son Mark Fowler (Todd Carty), while they work together on Christine's garden. Power filmed her scenes for the five episodes and thought that would be the end of it; however, she was subsequently contacted by Leonard Lewis and asked to reprise the role. Power commented "It was all I could do to stop myself screeching down the phone. They didn't tell me which direction the story was going to take. I got on so well with [Bill Treacher] from the word go. We really liked each other." Mrs Hewitt is reintroduced in a storyline that sees her become Arthur Fowler's mistress, but when the affair ended Power left the series, making her final appearance on-screen in October 1993.

== Anne Howes ==
Anne Howes
- EastEnders character
- Portrayed by: Cassie Stuart
- First appearance: Episode 740; 10 March 1992
- Last appearance: Episode 749; 9 April 1992
In-universe information
- Occupation: Personal assistant
- Husband: Terry Howes

Anne Howes, played by Cassie Stuart, meets Phil Mitchell (Steve McFadden) while he is on a stag night in a curry house. Phil brings her back to his home at The Queen Victoria public house and they have sex. A romance is quick to develop, but Anne turns out to be a habitual liar. She refuses to give Phil her home telephone number or allow him back to her house and when Phil questions her on this, she becomes defensive and hostile. By this time Phil has fallen for her, so he perseveres, but he begins to grow suspicious when he spots her arguing with a strange man in the middle of Bridge Street market. Anne claims that the man was merely an ex-boyfriend, but when Phil confronts him he is told that Anne is his wife and a serial adulterer.

Phil is angered by her dishonesty, but Anne claims that her marriage is over, which her husband, Terry (Neal Swettenham), refuses to accept. She portrays Terry as suicidal and needy and promises that her feelings for Phil are genuine. Phil eventually accepts her explanation and confesses to loving her, but Anne remains uncertain about leaving her husband, fearing that he will kill himself if she does. After days of ignoring Phil, Anne agrees to discuss their relationship over dinner, but she arrives at the restaurant late, claiming that her husband had locked her in their bedroom. Terry follows them there and is shocked to discover that Anne had claimed he was suicidal, dismissing this as one of her lies. He pleads with Phil to finish with Anne for the sake of their young daughter – another secret that Anne has been keeping. Phil ends the affair after realising that Anne has been lying to him all along.

== Mandy Salter ==
Mandy Salter, played by Nicola Stapleton, is introduced on 12 March 1992, and portrayed as a teenage tearaway. She is featured in storylines about homelessness, child and drug abuse. Her relationship with Aidan Brosnan (Sean Maguire) is one of the prominent storylines featured in 1993. Due to the character's devious behaviour, it has been suggested that Mandy was one of the most hated characters on television during her tenure. Mandy was one of several introductions to the cast of EastEnders in 1992. Executive producer Leonard Lewis took a tentative approach to introducing new characters in 1992. Most were introduced gradually, making an initial appearance and then joining the programme full-time a couple of months later. This allowed the producers and writers to create new characters and see them brought to life by the actors before committing them to a longer contract. Mandy first appears in March 1992 as a school girl aged 15, abandoned by her mother in Pat Butcher's care. She left the series temporarily a few weeks later; in the storyline she goes back to her mother's flat, but she returns by the summer of 1992 as a regular character, squatting in the soap's setting of Albert Square. Stapleton quit the role and Mandy departs on-screen on 13 January 1994.

Stapleton claimed that she has been asked to reprise the role at various times, and although she turned these offers down, in 2009 she stated the door has been left open for Mandy to return. In June 2011, it was confirmed that Stapleton was to reprise her role as Mandy and she reappears from 29 August 2011.

In her return storyline, Mandy is found working as a lap dancer by Ian Beale (Adam Woodyatt), who offers her a place to stay back in Walford, and they begin a relationship. However it is also revealed that Mandy became pregnant with Ricky Butcher's (Sid Owen) child just before she left Walford in 1994, and gave birth to a premature daughter, Kira, who died shortly after birth. Mandy and Ian make plans to marry, but on their wedding day she refuses to marry him, revealing that she has been forcing herself to love him. Ian begs her to stay but Mandy leaves Walford again.

== Nigel Bates ==
Nigel Bates, played by Paul Bradley, was introduced in 1992 by Leonard Lewis, the character was incorporated gradually and brought back as a regular following a brief stint due to a popular reception. He is depicted as a lovable loser and a nerd. Bradley quit the role and Nigel was written out of the serial in April 1998 and was given a happy ending. The door was left open for a possible future return. Nigel was one of several introductions occurring in 1992. Executive producer Leonard Lewis took a tentative approach to introducing new characters in 1992. Most were introduced gradually, making an initial appearance and then joining the programme full-time a couple of months later. This allowed the producers and writers to create new characters and see them brought to life by the actors before committing them to a longer contract. Characters introduced in this way included Mandy Salter (Nicola Stapleton) and Christine Hewitt (Lizzie Power).

== Terry Howes ==
Terry Howes
- EastEnders character
- Portrayed by: Neal Swettenham
- First appearance: Episode 744; 24 March 1992
- Last appearance: Episode 749; 9 April 1992
In-universe information
- Wife: Anne Howes

Terry Howes, played by Neal Swettenham, is the estranged husband of Phil Mitchell's (Steve McFadden) girlfriend, Anne (Cassie Stuart), although this is not revealed straight away. Originally Anne claims that Terry is a former lover, who has taken their separation badly. Phil becomes suspicious when he sees Anne and Terry rowing and, later that evening, Terry is spotted lurking outside Phil's house. Furious, Phil tries to warn him off, but Terry stuns him by revealing that he and Anne are actually married.

Anne convinces Phil that her marriage is over, but she is unable to leave Terry as he had threatened to kill himself if she did. When Phil confronts Terry with this, he discovers that Anne has been lying – she'd had numerous affairs in the past, but always came back to him in the end. Terry then shocks Phil by telling him that he and Anne have a young daughter. He begs him to end the affair for her sake. Phil does so after realising that Anne had been lying all along.

== Gary Phillips ==
Gary Phillips
- EastEnders character
- Portrayed by: Scott Lane
- First appearance: Episode 746; 31 March 1992
- Last appearance: Episode 753; 23 April 1992

Gary Phillips, played by Scott Lane, is a friend of Lloyd Tavernier (Garey Bridges). He and his friend Wesley are into shoplifting and raiding skips and repossessed houses for discarded junk, which they sell on Brick Lane.

On one occasion, Gary steals a car and takes it for a joyride with Lloyd and Wes. His unruly driving catches the attention of the police and a chase ensues. The police eventually corner them and all three are arrested and charged.

They stand trial in front of a magistrate in April and Gary is sent to a young offenders institute for a three-month sentence. He is also disqualified from driving for two years. Lloyd manages to get off with a suspended sentence because he has sickle cell disease.

== Jonathan Hewitt ==
Jonathan Hewitt
- EastEnders character
- Portrayed by: Jonny Lee Miller
- First appearance: Episode 754; 28 April 1992
- Last appearance: Episode 759; 14 May 1992
In-universe information
- Occupation: Unemployed
- Father: Greg Hewitt
- Mother: Christine Hewitt

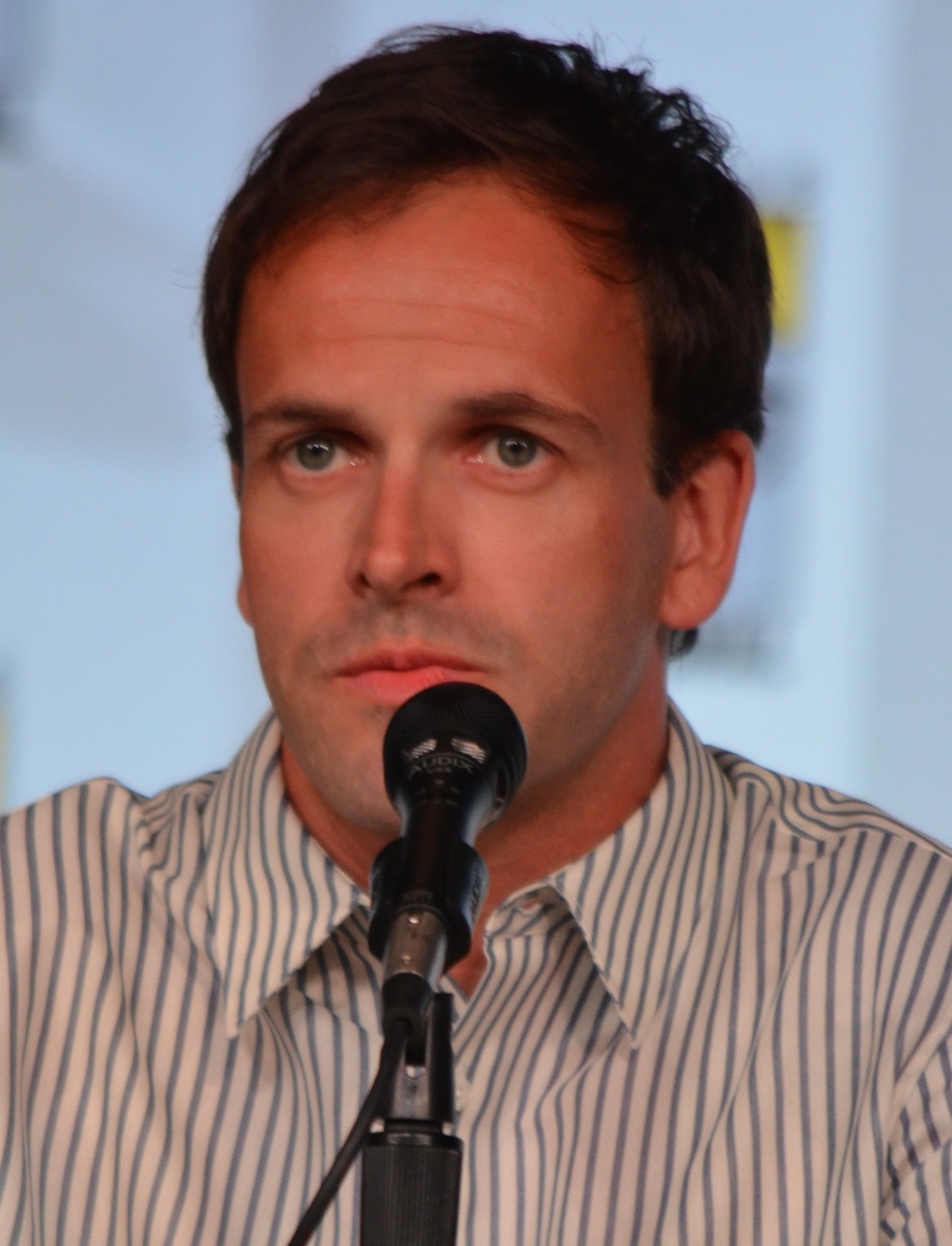
Jonny Lee Miller (pictured in 2012) portrayed Jonathan.

Jonathan Hewitt, played by Jonny Lee Miller, is the layabout son of Christine Hewitt (Elizabeth Power) – who employs Arthur Fowler (Bill Treacher) to tend to her garden. Jonathan has been unemployed for a while after dropping out of college, and when Christine sees Arthur advertising for a gardening assistant she approaches him and recommends Jonathan for the post. Arthur agrees and he and Jonathan spend several weeks tending to gardens in Albert Square.

Arthur's love for plants rubs off on Jonathan, and he seems extremely keen on the job, even helping Arthur sell his plants at the May Day fête on the Square. However, as the weeks go by Jonathan starts to shirk his responsibilities, leaving work early and then failing to show up at all. After a few days of absence, Arthur contacts Christine to complain. According to Christine, Jonathan has left London to attend a festival in Scotland with his hippy friends. Christine takes over the job in his place, which is the precursor to her affair with Arthur. Jonathan never appears again, but in March 1993 Christine visits him in Scotland because he has suffered an injury.

The role of Jonathan Hewitt was one of the first notable acting credits for Jonny Lee Miller, who went on to find greater fame as a film actor. Miller has since commented on his stint in EastEnders: "It was five weeks' work and I made more money there than I ever had in my life. Then they offered me a year's contract. I said no, thank God. I thought I should get out of there while I still could. No offence to EastEnders."

== Mr Papadopolous ==
Mr Papadopolous
- EastEnders character
- Portrayed by: Lee Warner (1992–1994); Uncredited (2009)
- Duration: 1992, 1994, 2009
- First appearance: Episode 760; 19 May 1992
- Last appearance: Episode 3838; 10 August 2009
- Introduced by: Leonard Lewis (1992); Barbara Emile (1994); Diederick Santer (2009)
In-universe information
- Occupation: Proprietor
- Father: Mr Papadopolous
- Sons: Apostolos Papadopolous
- Nephews: Nico Papadopoulos

Andonis Papadopolous, played by Lee Warner and known commonly as Mr Papadopolous, is the owner of the launderette on Bridge Street. In a long-running joke, employee Dot Branning (June Brown) has difficulty pronouncing his surname, and for much of the show's history he has been referred to as Mr. Oppodopolus, Oppydoppy, Olopolopous or varying other mispronunciations; some of these are used by other characters, including Yolande Trueman (Angela Wynter) who calls him Mr. P. Andonis. He is not the original owner of the launderette. From the show's inception until May 1992 the property is owned by his father, until he dies while holidaying in his native Athens. The character is of Greek descent, but the Papadopouloses are apparently based in Walthamstow, East London. Andonis makes his first appearance in May 1992, when he comes to Walford to assess the business following his father's death. Dot notices him taking a keen interest in the launderette and fears he is a murderer. She spends several days in a terrified state until Andonis makes a formal introduction the following episode, revealing his first name. He makes several alterations to the way the business is managed, much to Dot's dismay.

Over the next two years he shows up in Walford occasionally. He is featured in the programme's 1,000th episode on 12 July 1994, discovering that his employee Carol Jackson (Lindsey Coulson) is faking an illness to get out of work when he sees her attending the wedding of Nigel (Paul Bradley) and Debbie Bates (Nicola Duffett). The following day he fires Carol, as well as long-time employee Pauline Fowler (Wendy Richard), who had been covering up for her. He employs a relative to work in their place, but the launderette falls into chaos, so both are eventually offered their jobs back. Pauline makes him grovel before accepting and manages to get a 75-pence-per-hour payrise. He returned on 10 August 2009, although his face is not seen on screen, he does not speak and he is not named in the credits. He arrives at the launderette looking for Dot, and later finds her at her house, giving her a parcel. In 2012, Mr. Papadopolous' nephew, Nico Papadopoulos (Aykut Hilmi), makes an appearance as the manager of McKlunky's, a local fast food restaurant. In 2016, it is mentioned that he has passed the launderette on to his son, Apostolos Papadopolous (Tarrick Benham).

== Richard Cole ==
Richard Cole, played by Ian Reddington between 1992 and 1994, is a character was conceived by writer Tony Jordan. Designed to be "a bit of a lad, a charming womaniser", the original character's biography scripted him with as a uniform-wearing Cockney from London. However, when Sheffield-born actor Ian Reddington read for the role, the production team liked his portrayal so much that they altered the character's backstory so they could accommodate Reddington's Northern-English accent. The character was nicknamed "Tricky Dicky" both in the show and the British press and became a prominent soap womaniser and villain for the two years he appeared; he has flings with various female characters, most notably Kathy Beale (Gillian Taylforth) and Bianca Jackson (Patsy Palmer).

== Adrian Bell ==
Adrian Bell
- EastEnders character
- Portrayed by: Joseph Marcell
- First appearance: Episode 782; 4 August 1992
- Last appearance: Episode 783; 6 August 1992
In-universe information
- Occupation: Carpenter

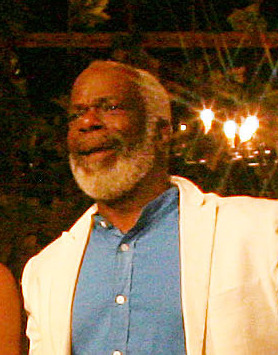
Adrian is portrayed by actor Joseph Marcell.

Adrian Bell, played by Joseph Marcell, appears in episodes 782 and 783, first broadcast on 4 and 6 August 1992 respectively. He is introduced as an acquaintance of Grant Mitchell (Ross Kemp).

Adrian is called urgently to The Queen Victoria public house in August 1992 to do some repair work on its furniture, after Grant had smashed the place up during a heated row with his wife, Sharon Mitchell (Letitia Dean). Adrian spends several days mending the furniture, though Sharon finds his presence an irritation, as he makes loud noises and takes up room in her bar. She is pleased with the job he does in the end, and is more than happy with his reasonable fee. Frank Butcher (Mike Reid) also tries to employ Adrian to install a cab office for his wife's cab firm in Bridge Street café. He wants to relocate the office from its current location at the car lot, where he works. When Frank's wife, Pat Butcher (Pam St. Clement), finds out, she forbids Frank from going ahead with the plan.

== Lilian Kominski ==
Lilian Kominski
- EastEnders character
- Portrayed by: Anna Korwin
- First appearance: Episode 795; 17 September 1992
- Last appearance: Episode 798; 29 September 1992
In-universe information
- Husband: Joseph Kominski
- Daughters: Rachel Kominski; Hannah Kominski

Lilian Kominski, played by Anna Korwin, is the mother of Rachel Kominski (Jacquetta May). She comes to stay with Rachel unexpectedly following a row with her husband, Joseph, and she refuses to return home until her husband begs her to. Lilian is an interfering, judgemental and critical person, who constantly upsets and embarrasses Rachel in front of her friends. She jibes Rachel for not dressing attractively or having a husband; criticises her lifestyle; meddles in her blossoming relationship with Richard Cole (Ian Reddington); frowns upon Rachel's lodger, Michelle Fowler (Susan Tully), for having an interracial relationship with Clyde Tavernier (Steven Woodcock); and tells anyone who cares to listen about how badly Rachel treats her and how much she has sacrificed for her. Rachel finds her presence highly stressful, but whenever she confronts her mother, Lilian gets upset, so Rachel is forced to backtrack to spare her feelings.

Lilian begins dropping hints about Rachel's past in passing conversations to her friends, indicating that she had always been forced to clear up Rachel's many mistakes. She depicts Rachel as a troubled and depressed child, and seems keen to divulge the reasons why. Rachel is furious when Michelle tells her that Lilian has been dropping hints about her secret past. She confronts her mother and it transpires that Rachel had fallen pregnant at 14, and Lilian had forced her to have an abortion, which left her depressed for a long while after. Rachel tells her mother that she resents her for forcing her into an abortion. This upsets Lilian and she tells Rachel that it broke her heart to lose her first and perhaps only grandchild, but there was no other option. Rachel fears that Lilian will divulge her secret if she stays in Walford, so she orders her mother to go back to her father. Lilian leaves the following day after making peace with Rachel.

== Shelley Lewis ==
Shelley Lewis
- EastEnders character
- Portrayed by: Nicole Arumugam
- Duration: 1992–1994
- First appearance: Episode 810; 10 November 1992
- Last appearance: Episode 1065; 13 December 1994
In-universe information
- Occupation: Student

Shelley Lewis, played by Nicole Arumugam, is a college friend of Michelle Fowler (Susan Tully), and is first seen in November 1992. When Michelle's housemate, Rachel Kominski (Jacquetta May), leaves Walford early in 1993, Shelley moves in with Michelle and her daughter Vicki Fowler (Samantha Leigh Martin) at 55 Victoria Road. She later gets a job as a part-time barmaid in The Queen Victoria pub, and is often seen hanging around with her other student pal, Rich, and her on/off boyfriend, Clem (Jason Yates), which causes problems with Michelle when they are caught smoking cannabis in front of Vicki.

Shelley initially sets her sights on Michelle's brother, Mark Fowler (Todd Carty). Both appeared smitten with each other, but Mark is harbouring a secret – he is HIV positive. Seeing them growing closer, Michelle tells Mark that he has to cool things with Shelley or tell her the truth. Mark then decides that it is best that they just remain friends.

Shelley is a bit of a user and after her brief fling with Mark ends she set her sights on local sleaze Richard Cole (Ian Reddington) thinking he'd be a good 'meal ticket'. Richard is happy to lavish Shelley with expensive gifts in the hope that they will coax her into having sex with him. Shelley is happy to take the gifts, but when Richard begins to seek a return from his investments, Shelley abruptly tells him that she 'wouldn't touch him with a bargepole'.

Shelley is still attracted to Mark and later initiates a kiss, reigniting their romance. In November that year, they (along with Michelle and Clem) go on a trip to Amsterdam. Shelley is still dating Clem, so she and Mark sneak away to be together at any opportunity. They eventually manage to give Clem and Michelle the slip and end up back at their hotel. Shelley makes her amorous intentions clear, but Mark seems hesitant and ends up walking out. A confused Shelley follows him and berates him for leading her on. Mark is finally forced to divulge that the reason he cannot have sex with her was because he is HIV positive. Shelley is furious with him for not trusting her enough to tell her in the first place and tells him she never wants to see him again.

Mark takes the rejection badly and he begins neglecting his health by not taking his HIV medication. During Christmas that year, he is rushed to hospital after collapsing. When Shelley finds out that Mark is ill, she rushes to him and confesses that she really cares for him and so they reignite their relationship. Shelley is desperate for Mark to meet her family and go on holiday with her parents. She becomes slightly infatuated with him and tries to spend as much time with him as she can. Mark feels that the relationship is moving too quickly and soon begins to tire of Shelley.

By March 1994, Mark decides to end the relationship but when he tries to break it off, Shelley resorts to emotional blackmail and says that if he left her, she would fail her exams. When this doesn't work, she resorts to begging, crying and emotional pressure, saying that she has risked her health being with him, so he owes her. After one final irrational outburst – where she almost publicly reveals that Mark is HIV positive – Shelley finally realises that the relationship is over and decides to leave Walford in March 1994.

Shelley makes one final appearance in December 1994, when she and Michelle attend their university graduation ceremony. Shelley is there with her fiancé, and has found herself a job with a publisher who plays golf with her fiancé's father. Shelley sees Mark and all their past animosity has been forgotten, although Mark's new girlfriend, Ruth Aitken (Caroline Paterson), is a little jealous of her.

== Jack Woodman ==
Jack Woodman
- EastEnders character
- Portrayed by: James Gilbey
- Duration: 1992–1993
- First appearance: Episode 811; 12 November 1992
- Last appearance: Episode 860; 29 April 1993
In-universe information
- Occupation: Student
- Father: Mr Woodman
- Stepmother: Mrs Woodman

Jack Woodman, played by James Gilbey, first appears in November 1992 as a student friend of Michelle Fowler (Susan Tully). Michelle goes to a student gig on campus and spends the night being chatted up by Jack. Unbeknown to Michelle, her boyfriend, Clyde Tavernier (Steven Woodcock), follows her there with Grant Mitchell (Ross Kemp) and finds her in bed with Jack, which ends their relationship.

Jack reappears in December 1992 when he arrives unexpectedly at the Fowler house on Christmas Day, to visit Michelle. Jack soon reveals that he wants to continue his fling with Michelle, although she is adverse to this and gently but firmly declines. Jack is not perturbed and he continuously shows up in Walford with various different excuses in a bid to get close to Michelle. He secretly takes photos of her; arranges to be privately home tutored by her landlady Rachel Kominski (Jacquetta May) and interferes with her lingerie; has numerous fights with Clyde; begins to spend time with her mother Pauline (Wendy Richard) so he can pry into Michelle's private life and then smashes his head against a brick wall and turns up at Michelle's looking for sympathy.

When Michelle's daughter, Vicki Fowler (Samantha Leigh Martin), is kidnapped in March 1993, Jack becomes prime suspect in the police investigation. When the police question him and discover that his room is littered with pictures of Michelle, they decide to keep him under surveillance. The real kidnapper is eventually caught, but Jack is furious with Michelle's betrayal. He continues to stalk her until she decides to take action. She enlists the help of Phil Mitchell (Steve McFadden) to scare him away and when this fails she contacted Jack's father (Peter Kelly) and stepmother (Helen Blizard) to confront them with his irrational behaviour. It is revealed that Jack has a history of stalking girls and, after Jack breaks down and confesses to everything, his father takes him home with him.

== Donald Cameron ==
Donald Cameron
- EastEnders character
- Portrayed by: Robert Wilson
- First appearance: Episode 818; 8 December 1992
- Last appearance: Episode 823; 24 December 1992
In-universe information
- Occupation: Retired

Donald Cameron, played by Robert Wilson, is a blind, Scottish ex-army sergeant who helped Dot Cotton (June Brown) with her Christmas carol concert in December 1992, by playing the piano. His fee is a bottle of malt whisky, provided by Nigel Bates (Paul Bradley). Ethel Skinner (Gretchen Franklin) also thinks he is attractive, and jokes with Dot about telling him that she has the body of a young woman, due to his blindness.

== Others ==
Character	Episode date(s)	Actor	Circumstances
Jimmy	2 January	Niall Refoy	Ian Beale's friend, who he tries to influence into giving information about the sale of the pizza parlour on Turpin road. Jimmy will not oblige.
Mr. Allen	14 January	John McAndrew	A man from Customs and Excise. He goes through Frank Butcher's accounts and tells Frank that there has been a serious underpayment of VAT for the last five quarters. Frank also has undeclared income and over valued VATable items. He asks Frank for a payment of £3014 within 30 days.
Mrs. Dunn	14 January	Uncredited	A social worker who James Willmott-Brown (William Boyde) introduces to Pete Beale (Peter Dean).
Craven	25 February – 5 March	Karl Collins	A man who steals one of Frank Butcher's cars and then drives it into a wall in a police chase. When Frank sees him drinking in the Vic a week later he phones the police, but Craven's friend Stephens gives him an alibi, so he gets off.
Cecil Olive Andrea	27 February	Keith Hodiak; Marsha Millar; Sharon Duncan-Brewster	A family who Attend the Taverniers' house party and frown upon Clyde's interracial relationship with Michelle Fowler. Cecil and Olive leave embarrassed after discovering their daughter Andrea canoodling with Lloyd Tavernier.
Stephens	3–5 March	Steve Weston	A dodgy friend of Grant Mitchell who tries to get him to illegally pass MOTs for his cars. Phil Mitchell refuses to let Grant do it.
Bernie Stanton	26 March	Patrick Carter	A dealer who provides Frank Butcher with used cars for his carlot. Frank accumulates heavy debts and is unable to pay him, so Bernie arrives and orders his employees to take back all the unpaid for cars. Frank is forced to pay Bernie in order to keep them.
Debbie	31 March	Kelle Bryan	A friend of Lloyd Tavernier's, who informs his mother Etta that he'd been missing college.
Wesley	31 March – 23 April	Nicholas Pinnock	A friend of Lloyd Tavernier who is into shoplifting. Wes, Lloyd and Gary Phillips are caught joyriding a stolen car and stand trial in April. Gary is sent to an offenders institute and Lloyd is given a suspended sentence, however Wesley's fate is never revealed.
Albert Davies	9 April	Martyn Ellis	A Welsh representative from Celtic Cross Breweries who comes to The Queen Victoria to persuade Sharon Mitchell to stock his beer. He gives her a free crate, which the customers soon finish.
Charles Raymond	14 April	Tim Stern	A property investor who comes to Walford to view and then buy Frank Butcher's house and B&B at number 18 and 20 Albert Square.
Mr. Richards	23 April	David Ellison	A rep from Gladstones brewery who comes to the Queen Vic to photograph Sam Mitchell after she is crowned "Miss Queen Vic". He convinces Sam that she could have a career as a model.
Mr. Wetherby	23 April	Robert McBain	Lloyd Tavernier's lawyer when he stands trial for joyriding.
Leo	30 April	Jack Carr	A photographer that takes pictures of Sam Mitchell (Danniella Westbrook) and sells them to a pornographic magazine.
Debbie	19 May – 21 May	Sally Rogers	An escort who Ian Beale hires to be his girlfriend for a dinner date. Ian gets drunk and makes advances towards Debbie, then gets abusive when she refuses him. The following day he begins harassing her, until the agency orders him not to call again.
Keith Steer	2–11 June	Tim Dantay	Keith and Charlie persuade Grant Mitchell (Ross Kemp) to carry out a raid on a betting shop. However, when Grant's wife Sharon Watts discovers what he is planning, she threatens him with divorce. Grant persuades his brother Phil Mitchell (Steve McFadden) to do the robbery in his place. Steer and Keating are incompetent amateurs, and Steer shoots Keating in the foot by mistake. When Phil stops to help the injured Keating, Steer drives off and leaves them. The police spend the next week questioning the Mitchell brothers about the robbery, but Phil is given a false alibi by Frank Butcher (Mike Reid) and Pete Beale (Peter Dean), so he avoids arrest.
Charlie Keating	9–11 June	Nicholas Tennant	
DC Firth	9–11 June	George Sweeney	Detectives who question Phil Mitchell after he carries out a robbery on a bookies. They know he is guilty, but Frank Butcher and Pete Beale give him a false alibi.
DS Jackson	9–16 June	Roger Sloman	Detectives who question Phil Mitchell after he carries out a robbery on a bookies. They know he is guilty, but Frank Butcher and Pete Beale give him a false alibi.
George	23–25 June	Colin Kerrigan	A nurse who works at the AIDS hospice where Gill Fowler dies. He supports Mark Fowler through his grief.
Jason	7 July	Tristan McGuire	A photographer who does a shoot with Sam Mitchell for a magazine storyboard.
Mick	7 July	John Love	A media student who acts as Sam Mitchell's boyfriend for a magazine photoshoot.
Dennis	21 July	Tony Aitken	An incompetent minicab driver, employed by Pat Butcher's cab firm. Frank Butcher is furious when Dennis crashes his minicab into his car. He only lasts in the job for one day.
Paula	28 July	Lisa Jacobs	A college friend of Michelle Fowler.
Margaret	28 July	Tina Jones	A personal tutor of Michelle Fowler, who gives her career advice when she fails her college exams. She encourages Michelle to pursue a career in teaching.
Ronnie Bains	11 August – 13 October (11 episodes)	Lesley Nightingale	A designer who hires Ian Beale's (Adam Woodyatt) catering company to help impress a prospective client after the client cancels the lunch, Ian and Ronnie decide not to let it go to waste and this sparks a romance between them.
Mike Bains	11 August – 15 October (2 episodes)	Rupert Degas	The son of Ronnie Bains, Mike comes home to find Ian Beale (Adam Woodyatt) and his mother Ronnie Bains talking. He asks if Ian, who he thinks is a prospective business client, if he likes any of his mother's designs. He later visits Ian in The Queen Victoria pub and headbutts him, before telling him to stay away from his mother.
Mrs Hogan	20–25 August	Gillian Raine	A woman who sells her deceased husband's belongings to Rachel Kominski, not realising that she is giving away an expensive fishing reel. Rachel sells the item for a profit, and Mrs Hogan's son tries to force Rachel to compensate them.
Sean Hogan	25 August	Aran Bell	A man who angrily threatens to sue Rachel Kominski for selling on his deceased father's fishing reel, which had accidentally been sold to her by his mother. His outburst causes him to be thrown out of The Queen Victoria pub by Grant Mitchell.
Charlie Grace	10 September	Frank Windsor	A man who meets Dot Cotton and Ethel Skinner at a tea dance. He charms Dot and they go for a romantic meal. However, while Dot is in the bathroom he disappears without paying the bill, and Dot also realises that he has stolen her purse.
Michael	22 September	Roger Monk	Two dodgy associates of Grant Mitchell who try to get him to be a driver in a "wages snatch".
Tony	22 September	Brett Fancy	Two dodgy associates of Grant Mitchell who try to get him to be a driver in a "wages snatch".
Dougie	24 September – 5 November (2 episodes)	Alexander Nash	Grant Mitchell recruits Dougie to be a driver in a "wages snatch" for a criminal gang. Dougie steals the money leaving Grant to face the repercussions from Jason Cox (Peter Moreton). Phil later tracks down Dougie and beats him and recovers the money and is able to square Grant's debt with Jason.
Colin Simpson	29 September	David McEwan	A worker from Walford council who serves Ricky Butcher an eviction notice for 23 Albert Square, where he had been squatting with Mark Fowler, Mandy Salter, and his wife, Sam. The notice instructs them to vacate the premises in 72 hours.
PC Edwards	29 September	Terrence Edmond	Police officers who accompany Colin Simpson when he hands Ricky Butcher an eviction notice.
PC Dugdale	29 September	Soo Drouet	Police officers who accompany Colin Simpson when he hands Ricky Butcher an eviction notice.
Clive	29 December 1992 – 2 February 1993	Sean Gallagher	Sam Mitchell and Mandy Salter meet Clive at a New Year's Eve party. He drives them back to Albert Square, where Sam's husband Ricky Butcher tells Clive to stay away from his wife. Clive later invites Sam away for the weekend and arranges to meet her at Sloane Square station. He finds Mandy and tells her the wrong time, so that she does not come with Sam. A couple of days later, Clive and his friend Sean drop Sam back home. Sam later confirms that she had sex with Clive. He later brings his friends to The Queen Vic and approaches Sam in front of Mandy and Ricky, who warns him off. Phil Mitchell then asks Clive and his friends to leave. Sam continues to see Clive and soon tells him she loves him. After arguing with Ricky, Sam shows up at Clive's home and meets his flatmate Suzie. She tells Clive that she has left Ricky and asks if she can move in until she sort herself out. Clive says it is not possible and then tries to entice her into a threesome with himself and Suzie, prompting Sam to leave.
