= Aidan Brosnan =

Fictional character from the BBC soap opera EastEnders

- EastEnders character
- Portrayed by: Sean Maguire
- First appearance: Episode 830; 14 January 1993
- Last appearance: Episode 930; 28 December 1993
- Introduced by: Leonard Lewis
In-universe information
- Occupation: Apprentice footballer

Aidan Brosnan is a fictional character from the BBC soap opera EastEnders, played by Sean Maguire between 14 January and 28 December 1993. A popular character, Aidan is involved in storylines about homelessness, drug-abuse and suicide. His relationship with the character Mandy Salter (Nicola Stapleton) is a dominant storyline in the serial throughout 1993.

== Creation and development ==
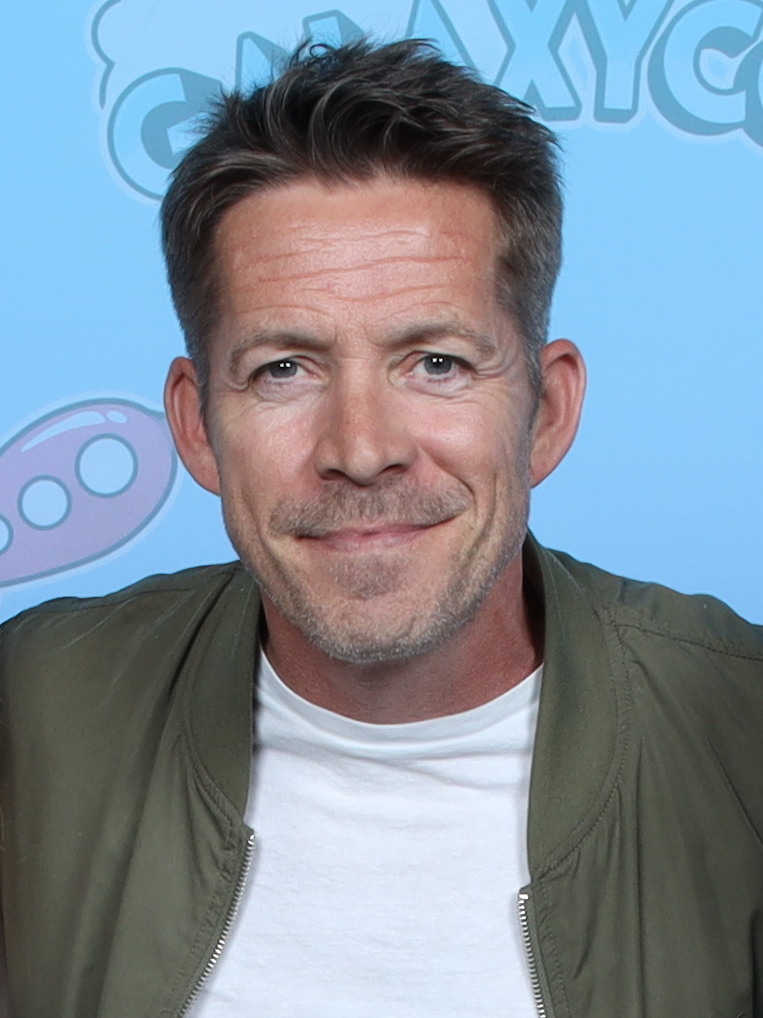
Sean Maguire (pictured) put on an accent for the role of Aidan.

The character of Aidan was introduced on-screen in January 1993 by executive producer, Leonard Lewis. The role was cast to actor Sean Maguire. Having been a familiar face on children's television for many years, Maguire was previously most famous for playing Tegs in BBC's school drama, Grange Hill. At his audition, Maguire had to show off his football skills and talk in a convincing Irish accent.

Aidan is introduced as a talented young Irish football apprentice at Walford Town Football Club. He is soon taken in by the Fowler family as a lodger, leading to his association with Mandy Salter (Nicola Stapleton), an established character who had been an EastEnders regular since the Spring of 1992. Aiden and Mandy's romance is of one of 1993's "major storylines", which runs throughout the year. Depicted as shy, naïve and impressionable, Aidan is quickly led astray by the troublesome Mandy, signifying the start of the character's misfortune and decline. In the storyline, a knee injury ends his promising football career, and after Mandy introduces him to alcohol and drugs and he falls out with his family in Ireland, the character ends up homeless and sleeping on the streets or in abandoned squats. Aidan slips into a depression, culminating in a suicide attempt, when in the Christmas Day 1993 episodes, Aidan decides to jump off the top of a tower block. The producers' original plan had been for Aidan to succeed in his suicide bid; however, in the book EastEnders: The First Ten Years, author Colin Brake has revealed that "the powers-that-be" at the BBC intervened in the storyline. They felt that a suicide on Christmas Day would be "too depressing even for EastEnders", so they ordered for the scripts to be revised. In the revised version, Mandy arrives just in time to stop Aidan jumping to his death, her love for him convincing him not to end his life. 23 million viewers tuned in on Christmas Day 1993 to witness Aidan's suicide attempt; it was the highest rated television programme of the day, trumping its biggest rival Coronation Street by 3 million viewers. Nevertheless, the storyline spelt the end of the character's time in the soap, Sean Maguire having chosen to leave to pursue other projects. The following episode, Aidan – resenting Mandy for her role in his misfortune – leaves to return to Ireland alone.

== Storylines ==
Aidan is first seen in January 1993 as a young, Irish, apprentice footballer for "Walford Town FC". When Arthur Fowler (Bill Treacher) notices his talents, he offers to assist Aidan as his coach and keeper. Aidan then moves in with Arthur and his wife Pauline (Wendy Richard).

Aidan catches the attention of Mandy Salter (Nicola Stapleton) and it isn't long before they begin a relationship, much to Arthur's concern, as he is aware of Mandy's past misdemeanours. Mandy is a bad influence on Aidan and after persuading him to skip practice, she gets him drunk on tequila and plans to seduce him, until Mark Fowler (Todd Carty) interrupts them. Whilst on his way home, Aidan (still extremely drunk) climbs on top of a parked car and falls off, severely injuring his leg. Aidan is out of action for a while, but his leg does recover; however, shortly after he is involved in another accident during training. As a result, Aidan can never play again and his promising career is over. Mandy and Ricky Butcher (Sid Owen) try cheering Aidan up by luring him into club-culture. After taking ecstasy, Aidan passes out in an ecstasy-induced coma and is hospitalised. He recovers from the incident but after his parents hear of his escapades, they force him to return to Ireland. Mandy is not willing to give her boyfriend up so easily; she follows him and persuades him to return in the summer where they quickly become Walford's most hated residents.

Upon returning, Mandy and Aidan are homeless so they break into Pete Beale's (Peter Dean) vacant flat and attempt to claim squatters rights, which only lasts days before Grant and Phil Mitchell (Ross Kemp and Steve McFadden) remove them. They now start sleeping on the streets and survive by begging, stealing prescription pads from Dr. Legg (Leonard Fenton) and selling them to drug-dealers, and stealing food whenever they can. Mandy turns to clipping (soliciting as a prostitute and then running away with the unsatisfied client's money), which ends when she is arrested and Aidan makes her promise to stop. They eventually take up residence in a rundown flat at number 5 Albert Square. They steal electricity from the neighbouring houses, causing a massive power cut but the electricity board put a stop to their scam. Meanwhile, Aidan and Mandy spend what little money they do have on alcohol and drugs.

Homeless Aidan, taken over by depression, contemplates suicide (Christmas Day 1993).

Towards the end of 1993, they both find employment at the First Til Last grocery store in Bridge Street but when the job falls through, they begin to go into decline. Aidan hears that his grandmother has died but because they are unable to reach him, he only discovers the news on the day of her funeral. Aidan visits Ireland briefly with money his parents send him, but learns on his return that Richard Cole (Ian Reddington) has started a smear campaign in his absence – wrongly accusing him and Mandy of being behind a series of robberies around the Square. Everyone begins to turn against them, and Aidan becomes increasingly ill and depressed. Things worsen when Richard buys the flat they are squatting in. When they refuse to leave, Richard breaks into their squat and evicts them days before Christmas. Aidan receives a letter from his parents telling him that they are disowning him after learning of his recent behaviour. After reading this, Aidan's depression gets so bad that he attempts suicide on Christmas Day by jumping off the top of a tower block. Mandy manages to stop him but he blames her for his misfortune and deserts her, returning to Ireland to reconcile with his parents. Mandy is devastated to lose Aidan and leaves Walford herself early in 1994.

== Reception ==
Although the character's duration was relatively short – he appears in only 63 episodes of the soap – Aidan became "a very popular" character, particularly with the young audience. EastEnders' scriptwriter Colin Brake has suggested that by the end of his stint in the soap, Sean Maguire's status as a teen pin-up "put him in the Take That league". Sean Maguire's departure upset his fans, though the actor attempted to develop his appeal towards the young audience by becoming a television presenter and a pop singer. Lewis Knight from Radio Times called Aidan a "heartthrob" and believed that Aidan and Mandy's relationship was toxic.
