= Victoria Alcock =

British actress (born 1968)

- Born: Victoria Alcock; 13 May 1968 (age 58); London, England
- Occupation: Actress
- Years active: 1991–present
- Known for: Bad Girls
- Spouse: Nic Goodey

Victoria Alcock (born 13 May 1968) is an English actress, best known for her role in Bad Girls.

== Notable roles ==
Alcock played the prisoner Julie Saunders in all eight series of the television drama series, Bad Girls and Agnes Clarke in The House of Eliott. In January 2012, Alcock was cast as Lorraine Stevens (née Salter), the ex-prostitute mother of Mandy Salter (Nicola Stapleton), in the BBC soap opera EastEnders, reviving the role from Linda Henry, who starred as Salter until 1992. Her first episode was broadcast on 1 March.

Alcock appeared in the 2009 Easter Special Doctor Who episode titled Planet of the Dead, playing Angela Whittaker alongside the Tenth Doctor (played by David Tennant). She also appeared alongside the Sixth Doctor (played by Colin Baker) on the Doctor Who Lost Story audio titled Power Play, playing Marion Tudor (who disliked being called "Mary"), a leading protester against a controversial nuclear power plant.

She is also known for playing Carol in all five series of the BBC's BAFTA-winning sitcom People Just Do Nothing, dinner lady Val in Alan Carr's semi-autobiographical sitcom Changing Ends for ITV, and as Sue in Sky's sitcom Mr Bigstuff alongside Danny Dyer and Ryan Sampson.

== Filmography ==
=== Film ===
1991	Under Suspicion	2nd Chambermaid
1998	Far from the Madding Crowd	Temperance Miller
2008	Incendiary	Trophy Woman
2021	No-One Gets out Alive	Mary

=== Television ===
Year	Title	Role	Notes
1991	Agatha Christie's Poirot	Ellie	One Episode: The Mystery of Hunter's Lodge
1991–1992	EastEnders	Laura	Two Episodes: Episode dated 11 June 1991 and Episode dated 21 January 1992
1991–1994	The House of Eliott	Agnes Clarke	Twenty-Five Episodes:
1991–2008	The Bill	Sonya Derby, Belinda Crawley and Maggie Roscoe	Three Episodes: Vital Statistics, 473 and Over the Limit
1992	Lovejoy	Kay	One Episode: Kids
1995	Chiller	Phoebe Hawkins	One Episode: Prophecy
1995	Castles	Kate Schofield	One Episode: Episode No. 1.16
1997	Grange Hill	Ruth	Two Episodes: Episode No. 20.9 and Episode No. 20.10
1998	Coronation Street	Mary Docherty	Two Episodes: Episode No. 1.4383 and Episode No. 1.4384
1999–2006	Bad Girls	Julie Saunders	Series One to Eight − Ninety-six episodes
2005	Casualty	Sandra McClean	One Episode: Antisocial Behaviour
2009	Doctor Who	Angela Whittaker	One Episode: Planet of the Dead
2009	Banged Up Abroad	Maggie	One Episode: Barbados
2009–2010	Missing	Laura Callow	Two Episodes: Episode No. 1.5 and Episode No. 2.4
2011	Call the Midwife	Betty Smith	One episode
2012	EastEnders	Lorraine Stevens	Five episodes
2013, 2018	The Dumping Ground	Denise Jackson	Four Episodes Series 1: SOS; Special: Jody in Wonderland; Series 6: Jody on the Ropes and Saved by the Bell
2014–2018	People Just Do Nothing	Carol	
2015	Birds of a Feather	Michelle	Series 11; Episode: "The Girls with the Pearl Buttons"
2018	Holby City	Karen Duggan	One episode, Best Christmas Ever
2019	Doctors	Shelly Chapman	One episode
2023–present	Changing Ends	Val	Recurring role
2024	Spent	Claire	First episode
