= Richard Cole (EastEnders) =

Fictional character from the BBC soap opera EastEnders

- EastEnders character
- Portrayed by: Ian Reddington
- Duration: 1992–1994
- First appearance: Episode 779; 23 July 1992
- Last appearance: Episode 1003; 21 July 1994
- Created by: Tony Jordan
- Introduced by: Leonard Lewis
In-universe information
- Occupation: Market Inspector

Richard Cole (also known as "Tricky Dicky") is a fictional character from the BBC soap opera EastEnders, played by Ian Reddington between 23 July 1992 and 21 July 1994.

== Creation and development ==
Producers Leonard Lewis and Helen Greaves took over control of EastEnders in 1992 and introduced a number of new characters. Most of them, such as Mandy Salter (Nicola Stapleton), Nigel Bates (Paul Bradley) and Christine Hewitt (Lizzie Power), were introduced gradually, making an initial appearance and then joining the programme as full-time characters a couple of months afterwards. EastEnders' writer Colin Brake has suggested that this allowed the producers and writers to see their new characters brought to life by their actors before committing them to longer contracts. The one exception to this procedure was the introduction of character Richard Cole, the soap's new market inspector, who joined the cast as a regular character without gradual introduction.

The character was conceived by writer Tony Jordan. Richard was designed to be "a bit of a lad, a charming womanizer" and the original character's biography scripted him as a uniform-wearing Cockney from London. However, when Sheffield-born actor Ian Reddington read for the role, the production team liked his portrayal so much that they altered the character's backstory so they could accommodate Reddington's Northern-English accent. The character was nicknamed "Tricky Dicky" both in the show and the British press and become a prominent soap womanizer and villain for the two years he appeared; he had flings with various female characters, most notably Kathy Beale (Gillian Taylforth) and Bianca Jackson (Patsy Palmer).

Tricky Dicky has been described as a "lothario", as well as "corrupt, shifty and slimy as they come". Author Kate Lock suggests that Tricky Dicky was aptly named, stating "he was sly, underhand and ruthless, both in his business dealings [...] and with women." She adds that he was "good-looking in an oily sort of way, but dropped his girlfriends once he'd got another notch on his bedpost."

Reddington left EastEnders in 1994. On-screen, Richard becomes embroiled in a feud with Ian Beale (Adam Woodyatt) and decides to flee Walford. It was reported in 2009 that the BBC were intending to reintroduce Richard Cole, 15 years after he last appeared. A source allegedly told The People, "[Richard] has unfinished business with Beale and it will add some tension to Walford". However, this was subsequently denied by the BBC.

== Storylines ==
Richard Cole arrives in Walford in 1992 as the new market inspector. He is known as a corrupt man who will pull every trick in the book to make money and he is not well liked by the community. He is also a notorious womaniser who has various brief flings. He briefly dates market trader Rachel Kominski (Jacquetta May) in 1992, but antagonises her later when he decides to give her permanent market pitch to his newly arrived friend, Sanjay Kapoor (Deepak Verma). In 1993, he has a romance with Kathy Beale (Gillian Taylforth), which sours when she discovers that he is taking a cash bribe and allowing a mobile hot dog van to trade in direct competition to her café. Later, he has sex with 17-year-old Bianca Jackson (Patsy Palmer), and when he dumps her shortly after, she and her friend Natalie Evans (Lucy Speed) vandalise his flat.

Richard makes various enemies, including Alan Jackson (Howard Antony), who he reports for benefit fraud, Arthur Fowler (Bill Treacher), whom he causes to lose his job as market sweeper, and the lovers Mandy Salter and Aidan Brosnan (Nicola Stapleton and Sean Maguire). Richard buys a property to let out for rent; Mandy and Aidan are squatting in one of the bedsits at the time and Richard evicts them, leaving Aidan homeless and suicidal over Christmas 1993. However, Richard's main rival is Kathy's son Ian Beale (Adam Woodyatt). Richard relishes winding up Ian by flirting with Ian's wife Cindy (Michelle Collins). Richard spreads rumours about having an affair with Cindy, implying that he is the father of Cindy's unborn twins, which causes various problems in the Beale marriage for a while. Later, Richard orchestrates the closure of Ian's catering business the "Meal Machine" by reporting him to environmental health.

In revenge for this in 1994, Ian forces Richard to flee Walford when he finds out some unsavoury things about his past. Richard had been a former planning officer for the council in Doncaster; he and a colleague, Neil Bradley (Martyn Whitby), had taken monetary bribes, but when they were caught, Richard framed his colleague, leading to the colleague's imprisonment. After Ian takes photographic evidence of Richard and threatens to inform Bradley where Richard is, Richard disappears, leaving his belongings/property in Sanjay's possession. Bradley shows up in Walford the following week and is dismayed to find Richard gone. He tells Sanjay to tell Richard that when he finds him, he will kill him.

== See also ==
- List of soap opera villains
