= Mandy Salter =

Fictional character from EastEnders

- EastEnders character
- Portrayed by: Nicola Stapleton
- Duration: 1992–1994, 2011–2012
- First appearance: Episode 741; 12 March 1992
- Last appearance: Episode 4436; 31 May 2012
- Introduced by: Leonard Lewis (1992); Bryan Kirkwood (2011)
- Spin-off appearances: Dimensions in Time (1993)
In-universe information
- Occupation: Stripper; Prostitute; Café waitress
- Mother: Lorraine Salter
- Daughters: Kira Salter

Mandy Salter is a fictional character from the BBC soap opera EastEnders, played by Nicola Stapleton. Introduced on 12 March 1992 by executive producer Leonard Lewis, Mandy was portrayed as a teenage tearaway. She was featured in storylines about teenage homelessness, child abuse and recreational drug taking. Her relationship with Aidan Brosnan (Sean Maguire) was one of the prominent storylines featured in 1993. Due to the character's antagonistic behaviour, it has been suggested that Mandy was one of the most hated characters on television during her initial tenure. The character appeared in a special episode of Doctor Who in 1993, which was set in the fictional soap setting of Walford. Stapleton left the role and Mandy departed on-screen on 13 January 1994. Stapleton returned to the role for a nine-month stint on 29 August 2011, and left again on 31 May 2012.

Following Mandy's initial exit, Stapleton claimed that she was asked to reprise the role on several occasions; she turned these offers down until producer Bryan Kirkwood negotiated her comeback in 2011. After a 17-year hiatus, Mandy reappeared from 29 August 2011 and began a relationship with the long-running character, Ian Beale (Adam Woodyatt). Mandy's return storylines focused on her dysfunctional relationship with her mother Lorraine (now played by Victoria Alcock), her unconventional engagement to Ian, and her fuelling conflict with Ian's teenage daughter Lucy (Hetti Bywater). On 4 April 2012, it was announced that Stapleton would be leaving EastEnders for a second time. Mandy and Ian were not given a happy ending; their relationship dissolved and Mandy departed in the episode broadcast on 31 May 2012.

== Creation and development ==
=== Introduction (1992) ===
Mandy as she appeared in 1992.

Mandy was one of several introductions to the cast of EastEnders in 1992. Executive producer Leonard Lewis took a tentative approach to introducing new characters in 1992. Most were introduced gradually, making an initial appearance and then joining the programme full-time a couple of months later. This allowed the producers and writers to create new characters and see them brought to life by the actors before committing them to a longer contract. Mandy first appeared in March 1992 as a school girl aged 15, abandoned by her mother in Pat Butcher's care. She left the series temporarily a few weeks later; in the storyline she went back to her mother's flat, but she returned by the summer of 1992 as a regular character, squatting in the soap's setting of Albert Square.

Mandy was portrayed as a troublesome teenager, with an underpinning storyline of child abuse and abandonment. Nicola Stapleton, 17 at the time, was cast in the role. During her initial stint in the soap, the character was featured in storylines about child and drug abuse, homelessness, blackmail, theft and prostitution (in the form of clipping).

=== Characterisation ===
In his 2005 book, Eastenders: 20 Years in Albert Square, author Rupert Smith classified Mandy as a "lost girl". He described her as "poisonous [...] the daughter of a dodgy old lush that Pat had picked up in a hostess bar, and she arrived in Walford to work out some grudge she held against the entire world." He added that "she lied, cheated and stole", suggesting that "there have been very few characters as entirely loathesome as Mandy Salter [...] The serpent in an East End eden." Author of EastEnders: Who's who?, Kate Lock, suggested that, "You wanted to feel sorry for homeless waif Mandy but her deviousness made it hard to even like her."

She has been described as a "manipulative force of nature" with a "spiteful streak". In 2011, the executive producer of EastEnders, Bryan Kirkwood, described Mandy as outrageous, uncompromising and pragmatic. He added, "although she's the result of a life on the streets, she's a survivor and isn't down on her luck. Mandy knows what to do to get by". Discussing Mandy in 2011, Stapleton said that Mandy only relies on herself and is "the sort of person who uses what she's got to get by." She described Mandy as minxy and incredibly flirty; someone who dresses skimpily and uses her body to get what she wants.

=== Homelessness and relationship with Aidan Brosnan ===
A lone character without family in the serial, Mandy was essentially homeless, and when she was unable to squat or rely on the kindness of strangers, she slept rough on the streets. This storyline came at a time when homelessness in London was a topical subject in the British media, partly due to the continued concern regarding Cardboard City, an area near Waterloo station that attracted a high proportion of homeless people who slept in cardboard boxes. Because of her involvement in this story arc, actress Nicola Stapleton became so affected by the plight of young homeless people that she joined the charity 'Countrywide', who raise money for the homeless. In January 1993 she told Inside Soap, "I have always thought the homeless situation was terrible, but through my research into playing Mandy, I have realised just how many young people it affects. I think it is really tragic that we have teenagers in this country sleeping out on the streets. And it isn't a problem that will go away. I just hope that by drawing attention to the problem in EastEnders more people will be willing to help [...] It is important that people realise that anyone can end up homeless. If you lose your flat or your job, you can end up in a downward spiral that will dump you on the streets. We can't shut our minds to this situation, because it could happen to any of us. I know how fortunate I am, and therefore I know that I am in a position to help, which is why I have got involved with the [charity]."

With regard to Mandy, Stapleton believed that, in 1993, she was her "own worst enemy" and that some of her misfortune was associated to her upsetting other characters: "Mandy is constantly rubbing people up the wrong way, and upsetting them. Of course she has had a hard life, but she doesn't do herself any favours either. I would like to see her get a break and a chance to finally make something of herself."

In 1993, the character was paired romantically on-screen with Aidan Brosnan, played by Sean Maguire. Aidan and Mandy's romance was dubbed by EastEnders' scriptwriter Colin Brake as one of 1993's "major storylines", which ran throughout the year. Depicted as shy, naïve and impressionable, Aidan was quickly led astray by Mandy. In the storyline, Mandy introduced Aidan to alcohol and drugs and a swift decline for the couple culminated in them becoming homeless and sleeping on the streets or in abandoned squats. Aidan slipped into a depression, culminating in a suicide attempt, when in the Christmas Day 1993 episodes, he decided to jump off the top of a tower block. The producers' original plan had been for Aidan to succeed in his suicide bid; however, in the book EastEnders: The First Ten Years, author Colin Brake has revealed that "the powers-that-be" at the BBC intervened in the storyline. They felt that a suicide on Christmas Day would be "too depressing even for EastEnders", so they ordered for the scripts to be revised. In the revised version, Mandy arrived just in time to stop Aidan jumping to his death, her love for him convincing him not to end his life. 23 million viewers tuned in on Christmas Day 1993 to witness Aidan's suicide attempt; it was the highest rated television programme of the day, trumping its biggest rival Coronation Street by 3 million viewers.

Mandy (left) and Aidan were the focus of a storyline on teenage homelessness. Here the characters are depicted squatting in a maintenance room, on the roof of a block of flats (1993).

=== Departure (1994) ===
The homelessness storyline spelt the end of the couple in the soap, Sean Maguire having chosen to leave to pursue other projects. During the episode that aired on 28 December 1993, Aidan — resenting Mandy for her role in his misfortune — left to return to Ireland alone. Heartbroken, Mandy fled several weeks later, in January 1994.

In reality, Stapleton had grown tired of all the attention she received from being in such a high-profile show, and despite being offered a contract to continue, she quit the role. In an interview in 2005 Stapleton commented: "Working on EastEnders was so high-profile it put me off working on soaps for a while[...] I've been asked a number of times to go back but I've done a lot of really credible stuff in theatre, and I thought, 'It took me a long time get here. I'm not ready to go back to Mandy just yet' [...] The publicity with something regarding EastEnders is huge and sometimes you end up feeling like a famous person rather than an actress — I wanted my work to be more fulfilling than that."

In a 2009 interview with Walford Gazette, Stapleton said, "[EastEnders] always left the door open for Mandy to return. [But] at the moment I'm quite happy to be doing what I'm doing." She told the Daily Record that same year, "It doesn't bother me that I'm still recognised as Mandy from EastEnders. It means I made an impression with the character. I would never say never to going back. I don't think the show is as fabulous as it was 10 years ago but it's still pretty fantastic and you have to go where the work is."

=== Return (2011) ===
On 9 June 2011, it was confirmed that Stapleton would reprise her role as Mandy after 17 years, in autumn 2011. Stapleton revealed that she was approached about returning by executive producer Bryan Kirkwood in February 2010, after she was invited to watch the live episode of EastEnders that was transmitted for its 25th anniversary. Stapleton said, "It had been discussed before but as soon as Bryan Kirkwood started telling me all these storylines he wanted to do with Mandy, I was buzzing." Kirkwood, the producer overseeing Mandy's return, stated, "I love Nicola Stapleton, having worked with her elsewhere, and Mandy is going to be like a breath of fresh air when she arrives back". It was reported that Mandy had grown up slightly, but that she was still fun, chaotic and wild and she was tipped to cause trouble for at least one of Walford's well-known residents. Stapleton said of her return "I'm looking forward to playing Mandy again—it will be interesting to see what she's been up to all this time. I'm excited to be coming back and working with some old friends." Stapleton had always envisaged that Mandy would return to EastEnders at some stage; however, as time passed she began to doubt Mandy would return, so she was "thrilled" that she and the producers were able to make it happen.

Her return aired on 29 August 2011. Stapleton revealed that she deliberately did not watch EastEnders prior to her return as she did not want to know what any of the characters were involved in; she wanted to have the same inquisitiveness that Mandy would have when she returned to filming. However, she did re-watch old episodes from the 1990s featuring Mandy to get back into character. In January 2012, Stapleton revealed that she had enjoyed her second stint on EastEnders more than her initial stint.

=== Relationship with Ian Beale ===
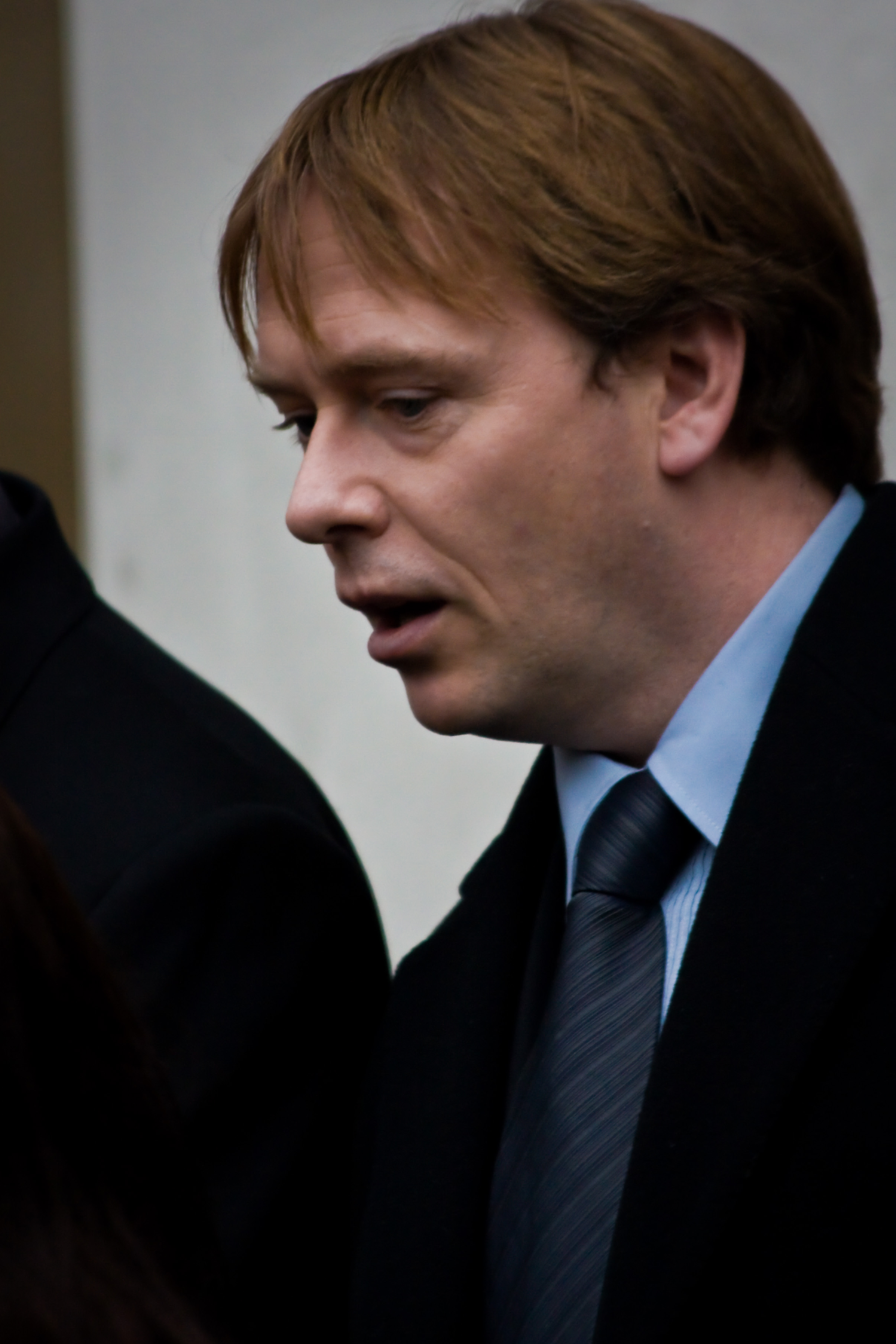
Ian Beale (played by Adam Woodyatt, pictured) was at the centre of Mandy's return storyline.

In her return storyline, Mandy is found working as a lap dancer by Ian Beale, who offers her a place to stay back in Walford. Discussing her character's return storyline and involvement with Ian Beale, Stapleton said, "Mandy has got her eye on every man in the Square — but with Ian it's just a friendship. She lifts his spirits and has a big effect on his life." She added, "I think [Mandy] is the most exciting thing that has happened to Ian in a long time. There's banter between them and she has a real energy that lifts his spirits. They have fun and Ian agrees to put her up [...] When we meet [Mandy] she's very much on her own living hand-to-mouth. I think there's a part of her that wants to be maternal as she gets on really well with [Ian's son] Bobby, who becomes her little mate." Stapleton suggested that Mandy and Ian's friendship involves bantering with one another and having fun, Mandy being a female presence in Ian's life following his separation from his wife Jane (Laurie Brett). Stapleton added, "people can affect other people's lives in different ways. Mandy is a full-on person, and I think that energy either rubs off on someone or aggravates them. It's quite interesting, because it kind of does both with Ian!".

Despite initially suggesting that Ian and Mandy's relationship was platonic, the storyline evolved, Ian confessing his feelings for Mandy after witnessing her flirting with other men. Through plot dialogue, the characters reveal their mutual desire to be loved, leading Ian to propose spontaneously to Mandy. Stapleton suggested that Mandy made Ian more frivolous. According to Stapleton, both were using each other: Mandy's motive being to gain security, and Ian's motive being to possess an attractive female. Although Stapleton suggested that the common discourse was that Mandy was using Ian for his money, she protested that there was a common connection between them.

Viewers were left guessing as to whether Mandy would go through with the wedding following a tryst with her former lover, Ricky Butcher (Sid Owen). In the end, Mandy was unable to go through with the wedding, but she remained engaged to Ian despite his discovery in the New Year's Day 2012 episode, that Mandy and Ricky had sex. Delving into events that occurred in Mandy's history during the years she was off-screen, it is revealed that Mandy fell pregnant with Ricky's baby when she departed in 1994, but the baby died shortly after being born. Discussing Mandy's revelation, Stapleton said, "Being close to Ricky was more about being close to the daughter she lost". She suggested that deep down, Mandy was looking for a family of her own and wants to be part of the Beale family.

Stapleton suggested that although Mandy's relationship with Ian was not portrayed as an immediate and big love affair, she believed the relationship could develop into love or fondness over time. Addressing the perceived differences between Ian and Mandy, Stapleton suggested that it gave them much "juicy" storyline material to work with. Stapleton also suggested that although she thought it would be nice for Mandy and Ian to have a happy ending, she was unsure that they would ever get married as she did not deem it necessary for them and felt it would change their relationship.

=== Acrimonious relationships ===
Mandy and Ian's storyline progressed with the reintroduction of Ian's daughter Lucy Beale (Hetti Bywater) in January 2012 who, taking a dislike to Mandy, tries to set her up. Stapleton revealed, "[Mandy's] desperate to win Lucy over but gets it all wrong [...] because she doesn't want Lucy to see her as the wicked stepmother she behaves like an older sister. Mandy gets drunk and Lucy gets her to buy some drugs. She does it because she thinks it's going to win her points with Lucy. Mandy passes out and wakes up to find the pills are gone. It's only later she discovers Lucy's planned it so [Ian's young son] Bobby finds the drugs." However, according to Stapleton, Mandy is capable of outwitting Lucy.

Lucy's vendetta against Mandy leads to the reintroduction of Mandy's estranged mother Lorraine, who appeared from March 2012. Linda Henry played Lorraine originally from 1991 to 1992 but Henry was already appearing in EastEnders as a different character, Shirley Carter, so the role of Lorraine was recast to actress Victoria Alcock. Described as a bad mother who allowed Mandy to "run wild on the streets" in her teenage years, it was suggested that Lorraine had not altered and remained a "brash" character. Lorraine's return was scripted to cause problems in Mandy's relationship with Ian and, according to Alcock, it was also intended to give viewers an insight into why Mandy turned out the way she had. Discussing Lorraine and Mandy's relationship Alcock said, "We've obviously seen Mandy go through hell and back. She's had her moments, and once you meet her mother, you understand how this poor girl has ended up like she is. Poor little love didn't stand a chance with a mother like [Lorraine]". Alcock added, "Many Albert Square residents didn't think there was a bigger leech than Mandy, but we see where she gets it from now. She has no qualms and she's proud of it. Allegedly she let some awful things happen to Mandy, which may come out in time. I think viewers are interested in the broken shells of a character and she's definitely a broken shell. You're not just made that way, something happens to make you like that. I reckon she was abused, and the abused often then become the abuser, and unfortunately that vicious circle has not been broken. I've tried to play her with a few levels." Stapleton added that "Lorraine puts on a big act for Ian. Mandy can see straight through her, but Ian doesn't understand why she's getting her knickers in a twist. When Lorraine's alone with Mandy, she's really cruel and cold. But she's very careful how she acts in front of everyone else." Stapleton was unsure whether this storyline would ultimately change viewer perception of Mandy: "When you play a really prickly character like Mandy, it's nice to take a look at why they behave like that. Whether it'll make viewers warm to her, I don't know. People love Mandy when she's awful!". Stapleton suggested that Mandy was petrified of Lorraine and she described scenes between the characters as dark and violent. Scenes airing in May 2012 where Lorraine informs Mandy that she never loved her were described by Stapleton as challenging and emotional to film. The storyline ended bleakly with Lorraine dying before Mandy could make amends with her mother.

=== Departure (2012) ===
On 4 April 2012, it was reported on the website Digital Spy that Mandy would be leaving EastEnders in mid-2012. Viewers were kept guessing as to whether she and Ian would marry. Mandy's departure circled around Ian's fragile emotional and mental state resulting from financial ruin and his brother Ben's confession that he murdered Heather Trott. During these events, Ian decided to bring his wedding to Mandy forward, despite her reservations following the death of her mother. Additionally, Ian's daughter Lucy tries everything she can to stop the ceremony, canceling the venue, throwing the wedding rings away, and finally giving Ian an ultimatum to choose her or Mandy. In the storyline, when Lucy forced Ian to pick between her and Mandy, he chose Mandy. Racked with guilt about being picked over Lucy and realizing that she never truly loved Ian, Mandy left the square, leaving a pleading Ian begging her to marry him. Mandy's exit proved the final straw for Ian's parlous emotional state, causing him to have a nervous breakdown; Ian is shown walking down a motorway, barefoot in his pajamas at the end of the episode, leaving his family and viewers unsure of where he had gone.

Of her decision to leave EastEnders Stapleton commented, "I've had a great time at EastEnders, working with friends old and new. Who knows whether Mandy will return? Let's hope it doesn't take another 17 years!". A spokesperson added that "EastEnders bosses kept Nicola on for longer than expected as they are building up to a big storyline for Ian." The culmination of the storyline was scripted to coincide and facilitate actor Adam Woodyatt's temporary break from the soap opera, with his character Ian being off-screen for approximately six weeks following his breakdown. Of Mandy's return arc, Stapleton commented: "I don't want to play someone who's normal and boring — I want somebody who's feisty and spicy. I love Mandy. She's got layers, I think — she's deep and she's troubled. It's been really nice, actually, with the last few storylines that I had with Vicky Alcock who played my mum. It's fine to put a character on the telly and say, 'Oh, what a horrible person', but it's nice to explain why people might be like that. I think they tackled those storylines really well. It's been a nice journey with her this time round because it's been a lot more explanatory. As I say, it's had a lot more layers so I've really enjoyed it". When asked whether she would return as Mandy, Stapleton said, "It's always open, so you never know — never say never. I never said last time that I would never go back. I enjoyed it so much more than I really thought I was going to. It was lovely meeting the new people and cast that I hadn't worked with before."

== Storylines ==
=== 1992–1994 ===
Mandy arrives in Albert Square in March 1992 when her hospitalised mother, Lorraine (Linda Henry), leaves her in Pat Butcher's (Pam St Clement) care. She makes friends with Sam Butcher (Danniella Westbrook) but eventually leaves the Butchers as she feels unwanted by Pat's husband, Frank (Mike Reid). She then begins squatting.

Mandy is a troublesome teenager. She blackmails Ian Beale (Adam Woodyatt), threatening to divulge that he visits prostitutes unless he employs her. Ian does not succumb, so Mandy survives by stealing, conning people and relying on charity. After Mandy is evicted from her squat, Kathy Beale (Gillian Taylforth) allows her to live with her, but Mandy is eventually thrown out when she is caught spreading rumours that Kathy has been abusing her. Mandy ends the year homeless and sleeping in a makeshift shanty. Mark Fowler (Todd Carty) and Steve Elliot (Mark Monero) eventually let Mandy stay with them, but Mandy's stirring contributes to the demise of Steve's relationship with Hattie Tavernier (Michelle Gayle); Mandy and Hattie maintain an antagonistic relationship throughout their time together in Walford. On Christmas Eve 1992, Mandy receives a Christmas card from her mother, telling her she is visiting. However, Lorraine never arrives, so on Christmas Day, Mandy returns to Lorraine's flat but finds her mother's abusive boyfriend Gary (Thomas Craig) instead. He is mean to Mandy and starts beating her, until she is rescued by Mark.

Mandy meets Irish football trainee Aidan Brosnan (Sean Maguire) in 1993. They begin dating, but Mandy is a bad influence on Aidan and encourages him to skip football practice, get drunk and use ecstasy. This results in an intoxicated Aidan falling and damaging his knee, and following a subsequent injury, Aidan is told that his career in professional football is over. The loss of his dream hits Aidan badly, but by now Mandy has fallen for him in a big way, and when he returns to Ireland, she follows him. Both soon return, having had a poor reception from Aidan's family. The young lovers are unable to find work so they begin sleeping on the streets and squatting. To get money, Mandy and Aidan beg and occasionally do odd jobs. It is on one such occasion that Grant Mitchell (Ross Kemp) leaves his wife Sharon Mitchell's (Letitia Dean) pet poodle, Roly, in Mandy's care. However, Mandy loses control of Roly and he dies after running straight into an oncoming truck, devastating Sharon. Mandy later cleans Dr Legg's (Leonard Fenton) GP surgery, but after stealing prescription slips and selling them to drug dealers, she is sacked. She then turns to 'clipping', acting as a prostitute then running off with the customer's money without performing the sexual service. However, the other prostitutes in Kings Cross beat Mandy and after she is arrested, Aidan makes her promise to stop.

When Richard Cole (Ian Reddington) starts a smear campaign against them, accusing them of being behind a series of robberies around the Square, everyone turns on them. Aidan becomes depressed and on Christmas Day 1993 he attempts to commit suicide by threatening to jump off the top of a tower block. Mandy manages to stop him but Aidan realises that Mandy is bad for him, and he returns to his family in Ireland.

Mandy is distraught at losing Aidan. Pauline Fowler (Wendy Richard) takes sympathy and allows her to stay with her; Mandy sees New Year 1994 in, huddled and sobbing on the Fowlers' couch. Early in 1994, Mandy turns to Ricky Butcher (Sid Owen) for comfort and they have a one-night stand. However, this only makes Mandy realise how much she misses Aidan, and she rejects Ricky's further advances. All alone, Mandy leaves Albert Square in January 1994, repaying the Fowlers' kindness by stealing Pauline's purse and hitching a ride with a lorry driver, who is heading west on the M11.

=== 2011–2012 ===
Mandy is not seen again for 17 years until Ian stumbles across her being thrown out of a strip club by a man Mandy claims is her abusive ex-boyfriend; however, it transpires the man is her employer at the strip club from whom Mandy has stolen £5,000. Ian allows her to stay with him in Walford and a friendship develops as Mandy bonds with Ian's son Bobby (Alex Francis) and helps Ian discover his frivolous side. Ian develops romantic feelings for Mandy and she accepts his impromptu marriage proposal. However, when Mandy meets her old friend Ricky, they reminisce, take drugs and have sex. This causes Mandy to rethink marriage to Ian; she decides not to attend the wedding ceremony but Ian pleads with her to change her mind and the wedding is rearranged.

In January 2012, Ian discovers Ricky and Mandy's tryst; the revelation ends Ricky's marriage to Bianca Butcher (Patsy Palmer). Mandy confesses to Ian that she became pregnant with Ricky's child in January 1994 and gave birth to a premature daughter, Kira, who died. She suggests she had sex with Ricky because of unresolved feelings for her dead daughter. Ian forgives Mandy but further problems arise when Ian's daughter Lucy (Hetti Bywater) returns to Walford and takes a dislike to Mandy. Lucy attempts to turn Ian against Mandy by setting her up, poisoning Bobby's mind against her and sabotaging Mandy's wedding plans. When Lucy discovers Mandy texting someone called "L Stevens", she suspects Mandy is having an affair and arranges for "L" to visit, not realising "L" stands for Lorraine, Mandy's estranged, alcoholic mother (now played by Victoria Alcock). Seeing an opportunity to make use of Ian's resources, Lorraine convinces him that she wants to bond with Mandy, but when he is absent she verbally and physically abuses Mandy. Lorraine's true nature is eventually revealed and Ian sends her away, but her stirring nearly causes Mandy and Ian's relationship to end. When a sickly Lorraine returns to Walford, Ian forbids Mandy from caring for her. Secretly, Mandy visits Lorraine in hospital and they briefly bond, but Lorraine turns nasty again when Mandy disobeys her, telling her that she has never loved or wanted her. A few weeks later, Mandy is devastated to learn that Lorraine has died. Ian, who is going through financial difficulties and is behaving erratically, refuses to let Mandy grieve and goes ahead with his plans to bring their wedding forward. On their wedding day, Mandy is perturbed by Ian's increasingly strange behaviour and refuses to marry him, revealing that she has been forcing herself to love him. Ian begs her to stay but Mandy leaves as a devastated Ian shouts her name. Ian suffers a breakdown and absconds shortly after without telling his family where he is going. When Lucy discovers Ian's credit card being used in a Rochester hotel a week later, she and Phil Mitchell (Steve McFadden) go in search of him. They find Mandy, who has been using Ian's credit card to pay for her mother's funeral. Mandy denies knowing where Ian is. She vows to make a success of her life, stating it is "time to grow up".

== Other appearances ==
Mandy was featured in a special episode of the popular science fiction series, Doctor Who, which was entitled Dimensions in Time (1993). The episode was specially screened as part of BBC's annual fund-raising event, Children in Need. Viewers were asked to phone in and vote which EastEnders character, Mandy or 'Big' Ron (Ron Tarr), would appear in the show and save the Doctor from certain death. Two versions were filmed for each voting outcome, but the Mandy version won with 56% of the vote.

== Reception ==
Mandy won the award for Soap's Biggest Bitch at the 1993 Inside Soap TV Awards. According to Josephine Monroe, author of The EastEnders Programme Guide, Mandy Salter was one of the most hated characters on television during her reign; a "teenager from hell". Stapleton has alleged that some viewers hated Mandy so much, due to her despicable deeds on-screen, that she was subjected to taunts in the street and her car was regularly vandalised.

Underpinning the character of Mandy was a storyline about child abuse, and Stapleton has revealed that she received "a lot" of letters from children in the same situation. She commented, "You want to help but all you are really permitted to do is say this is Childline's number and encourage them to talk to someone."

Mandy's return in 2011, after a 17-year hiatus, was well received by Jane Simon of the Daily Mirror. Simon stated, "For an all-too-brief time in the 90s [Mandy] was the Square’s number-one troublemaker [...] it’s great to have her back." In October 2011, Stapleton suggested that viewers had reacted positively to Mandy's return. Sarah Ellis of Inside Soap said that she was not convinced by Mandy and Ian's relationship. She predicted that it would only take six months before Mandy ran away with a younger male. Kate White from the same magazine was sad because Mandy was leaving in 2012; she said Mandy had been "wasted in the endless on-off-on-off-on-off-zzzzz romance with Ian". She hoped that Mandy would return in the future "as a proper bitch" with a "proper plot".

== See also ==
- List of EastEnders characters (1992)
- List of soap opera villains
