= Linda Henry =

English actress (born 1959)

- Born: Linda Henry; 24 August 1959 (age 67); Peckham, London, England
- Other name: Linda Valiris
- Occupation: Actress
- Years active: 1982–present
- Notable work: Bad Girls; EastEnders
- Spouse: Stavros Valiris (m. 1992)
- Children: 1

Linda Valiris (née Henry; born 24 August 1959) is an English actress, known for her roles as Yvonne Atkins in the ITV prison drama series Bad Girls and Shirley Carter in the BBC soap opera EastEnders. She had previously appeared in EastEnders as the original Lorraine Salter, the mother of Mandy Salter (Nicola Stapleton), from 1991 to 1992; her former Bad Girls co-star Victoria Alcock took over the role on the character's return in 2012. Her other acting credits include Cracker (1995), Prime Suspect (1997) and Trial & Retribution (1998). She has also appeared in the films Beautiful Thing (1996) and The Business (2005).

== Early life ==
Henry was born on 24 August 1959 and was brought up in Peckham, London. She spent some time with the Old Vic Youth Theatre. At 17, she went to the Webber Douglas Academy of Dramatic Art.

== Career ==
In 1996, Henry played Sandra in the film Beautiful Thing. In 1999, Henry began portraying Yvonne Atkins in the ITV prison series Bad Girls, a role she played until she quit the series in 2003. She has appeared in various other British television programmes including The Bill, Birds of a Feather, Touching Evil, Cracker, A Touch of Frost, Trial & Retribution as Marilyn Spark and EastEnders, where she played Lorraine Salter, the mother of Mandy Salter (Nicola Stapleton). She also appeared in British film The Business, alongside Danny Dyer.

On 8 September 2006, it was announced Henry would be returning to EastEnders in a different role, this time playing Shirley Carter, mother to Carly (Kellie Shirley) and Deano (Matt Di Angelo) and ex-wife of Kevin (Phil Daniels). Dyer, whom she had worked with previously, was cast in 2013 as Shirley's son Mick. In late 2022, Henry embarked on what was initially described as an "extended break" from EastEnders. She was expected to return, but in July 2025, reports emerged that she had no intention of reprising the role. That same month, she appeared as Pam in the second series of Mr. Bigstuff, once again working with Dyer.

== Personal life ==
Henry married Stavros Valiris in 1992. Their daughter was born in 1993.

In 2014, she was arrested for racially aggravated harassment. Henry pleaded not guilty and stood trial on 11 February 2015 at Bexley Magistrates' Court in south London. She was later cleared of all charges.

== Filmography ==
=== Film ===
Year	Title	Role	Notes
1988	For Queen & Country	Kim	
1993	Don't Leave Me This Way	Janet Weir	
1996	Beautiful Thing	Sandra Gangel	
2005	The Business	Shirley	

=== Television ===
Year	Title	Role	Notes
1982	The Young Ones	Girl at party	Episode: "Interesting"
1988	Rockliffe's Babies	Sharon Hagerty	Episode: "A Trip to the Zoo"
1988	Screen Two		
1988	The Comic Strip Presents...	Jackie	
1988–1990	Eurocops	Linda Jackson	3 episodes
1989	Forever Green	Doc	Series 1 Episode 4
1989	The Nineteenth Hole	Council tenant	Series 1 Episode 7
1990	The Play on One	Carol Fairwater	Episode: "Yellowbacks"
1990	Birds of a Feather	Viv McCarthy	Episode: "Falling in Love Again"
1991–1992	EastEnders	Lorraine Salter	Guest role
1992	The Bill	Carol Armfield	Episode: "Part of the Furniture"
1993	Cracker	Mrs. Perry	Episode: "One Day a Lemming Will Fly Part 1"
1993	The Bill	Anne Riley	Episode: "Desperate Remedies"
1994	Moving Story	Sheila Roebuck	Episode: "Charlotte, Emma, Bamber and Anne"
1994	Casualty	Diane Daw	Episode: "Blood's Thicker"
1995	Prime Suspect: The Scent of Darkness	Forensic Scientist	Television film
1995	An Independent Man	Julie Read	4 episodes
1995	The Bill	Chrissie Root	Episode: "For Services Rendered"
1996	A Touch of Frost	Sue Venables	Episode: "Playing the Price"
1997	Touching Evil	Justine Barber	Episode: "Deadly Web: Part 2"
1997	Born to Run	Judith	Series 1 Episode 3
1998	Trial & Retribution	Marilyn Spark	2 episodes
1999–2003	Bad Girls	Yvonne Atkins	57 episodes
2006–2022	EastEnders	Shirley Carter	Series regular; 1,529 episodes
2008	Children in Need	Housemaid	Episode #1.29
2010	EastEnders: E20	Shirley Carter	5 episodes
2025	Mr. Bigstuff	Pam	Guest role

== Awards and nominations ==
Year	Award	Category	Work	Result	Ref.
2003	9th National Television Awards	Most Popular Actress	Bad Girls	Nominated	
2007	TVQuick & TVChoice Awards	Best Soap Newcomer	EastEnders	Nominated	
2008	Digital Spy Soap Awards	Best On-Screen Partnership (with Cheryl Fergison)	EastEnders	Nominated	
2008	British Soap Awards	Best On-Screen Partnership (with Fergison)	EastEnders	Nominated	
2008	Inside Soap Awards	Best Actress	EastEnders	Nominated	
2008	Inside Soap Awards	Best Bitch	EastEnders	Nominated	
2009	Inside Soap Awards	Best Bitch	EastEnders	Nominated	
2012	Inside Soap Awards	Best Actress	EastEnders	Shortlisted	
2013	Inside Soap Awards	Funniest Female	EastEnders	Nominated	
2014	2014 British Soap Awards	Best Comedy Performance	EastEnders	Nominated	
2015	20th National Television Awards	Serial Drama Performance	EastEnders	Nominated	
2022	2022 British Soap Awards	Best Leading Performer	EastEnders	Shortlisted	
