= Charlie Grace =

Charlie Grace may refer to:

- Charlie Grace (EastEnders), a character on British soap opera EastEnders
- Charlie Grace (TV series), a 1995 American crime drama
