= In Love with Barbara =

2008 British drama television film

- Written by: Jacquetta May
- Starring: Anne Reid, David Warner, Tom Burke, Jacquetta May
- Country of origin: United Kingdom
- Original language: English

Production
- Running time: 90 minutes

Original release
- Network: BBC Four
- Release: 26 October 2008

In Love with Barbara is a 2008 drama television film, inspired by the life of the romantic novelist Barbara Cartland, which tells the story of what made her the Queen of Romance. It was written by Jacquetta May and shown on BBC Four on Sunday 26 October 2008.

== Cast ==
- Anne Reid – Barbara Cartland
- David Warner – Lord Mountbatten
- Sinead Matthews – Young Barbara
- Tom Burke – Ronald Cartland
- Rebekah Staton – Helen
- Jacquetta May – Polly Cartland
- Christopher Naylor – Hugh McCorquodale
- Elliot Cowan – 'Sacchie' McCorquodale
