= Christopher Naylor (actor) =

British actor

Christopher Naylor is a British actor and artist. He trained at LAMDA.

His television work includes Warriors for director Peter Kosminsky (1999), Bugs (1999), Plastic Man opposite John Thaw (1999), Sweet Revenge (2001), In Love with Barbara (2008), The Alienist (2018) and The Crown (2018).

On film he has appeared in Benediction (2021) for director Terence Davies.

His theatre work includes Dangerous Corner (1999) and Hard Times (2000) at the Watermill Theatre, tour of Hay Fever (2007), Song of the Western Men by Christopher William Hill at the Minerva Theatre, Chichester (2002), Jack Worthing in The Importance of Being Earnest at York Theatre Royal (2005), Blue/Orange at the New Victoria Theatre, Stoke (2007), the world premiere of Leaving (2008) by Vaclav Havel and the Middlemarch trilogy (2014) at the Orange Tree Theatre. In 2009 he starred in the West End stage production of The Woman in Black at the Fortune Theatre. In 2018 he played Captain Friedrich Muller in the Royal National Theatre's UK and international tour of War Horse.

Christopher plays the Doctor Who companion Harry Sullivan in audio dramas for Big Finish Productions, opposite Tom Baker's Fourth Doctor and Sylvester McCoy's Seventh Doctor, and as part of UNIT.

As an artist, he has illustrated two books for Ben Miller, The Night We Got Stuck In A Story (2022) and Secrets Of A Christmas Elf (2022), published by Simon and Schuster. Christopher has painted the cover images for the Big Finish audio dramas, Jekyll and Hyde (2022) and The Demon Song (2023).
