= Lava (2001 film) =

2001 film by Joe Tucker

- Directed by: Joe Tucker
- Written by: Joe Tucker
- Produced by: Michael Riley (film producer); Gregor Truter
- Starring: Joe Tucker; James Holmes (actor); Grahame Fox; Nicola Stapleton; Leslie Grantham; Tom Bell
- Cinematography: Ian Liggett
- Edited by: St John O’Rorke
- Music by: Simon Fisher Turner
- Production company: Sterling Pictures
- Distributed by: Universal Studios
- Release date: 2001
- Running time: 96 minutes
- Country: United Kingdom
- Language: English

Lava is a 2001 British black comedy directed by Joe Tucker.

The film competed at the Alexandria International Film Festival, Filmfest Oldenburg, Austin Film Festival and Rome Independent Film Festival in 2001.
