= Jane Hall (TV series) =

British television series

Jane Hall is a six-part British television comedy drama on ITV, written by Sally Wainwright and starring Sarah Smart, Stephen Mangan, Daniel Lapaine, Geraldine James, Nitin Ganatra, Gillian Taylforth, Ian Reddington, Ann Mitchell, Robert Glenister and Suzanna Hamilton. It revolves around Jane Hall's job training to be a bus driver and her home life in Hounslow, "the arsehole of London".

The series was originally to be titled Jane Hall's Big Bad Bus Ride, but was renamed Jane Hall due to concerns it would be seen as insensitive following the 7/7 attacks in London. It first aired in New Zealand in April 2006 on TV One (under the original title) achieving good viewing figures. It is produced by the independent Red Production Company, and was produced some two years before it eventually received its first UK broadcast in the summer of 2006.

It was reported in September 2006 that no further episodes would be commissioned.
