= Leonard Lewis =

British television director and producer

- Born: Leonard Jack Lewis; 29 November 1927; Tottenham, England
- Died: 2 December 2005 (aged 78); Somerset, England
- Occupation: TV Producer/Director
- Years active: 1960–1995
- Television: EastEnders
- Spouse: Jean Lewis (m. 1950)
- Children: 3 daughters

Leonard Jack Lewis (29 November 1927 – 2 December 2005) was a British producer and director. He was most active in television. He was the executive and series producer for BBC's EastEnders during the early 1990s, though he had success with many other television programmes for both the BBC and ITV. It has been said that Lewis believed in "the principles of public service broadcasting" and he has been described as a "gifted television producer with hidden directorial talents". After more than 40 years working in the television industry, Lewis retired in 1995. He died in December 2005, aged 78.

== Career ==
After completing national service in the RAF, he became an actor and worked in repertory at the Manchester Library Theatre, Morecambe and Ashton-under-Lyne. He joined the BBC on a three-month holiday attachment in 1957. He worked with BBC Scotland until 1963, when he moved to BBC London as a staff director.

Lewis began directing and later producing for BBC television, on shows such as Z-Cars (1965); Softly Softly (1969–74) and Adam Adamant Lives! (1966). In 1973 he directed and produced for the BBC's adaptation of Jack the Ripper, and he was also the executive producer for the detective series, Barlow at Large, and producer for Second Verdict.

In 1976 he produced the BBC series When the Boat Comes In, a north-east drama depicting the hard days of the twenties in the fictional town of Gallowshields. The show was nominated for "Best Drama Series" at the 1976 BAFTAs. It has been said that Lewis had a "respect for text and for writers", which brought him "acclaim", but also "a personal and professional crisis" after the BBC ordered him to scrap his writing team for the next series of When the Boat Comes In. Unwilling to betray his colleagues and friends, Lewis resigned from the BBC on principle.

Lewis moved to Yorkshire Television, producing The Good Companions (1980) and Flambards in 1979 – a 13-part historical drama series based on the novels by K.M. Peyton. He later returned to the BBC as a freelance, working on shows ranging from The Chinese Detective (1982); Rockliffe's Babies (1987–88); Juliet Bravo (1981–83) and The Prisoner of Zenda (1984).

In 1990 Lewis began directing the BBC soap opera EastEnders. By the end of 1991 he had been promoted to co-producer along with Helen Greaves, both taking charge of the show following the departure of executive producer Michael Ferguson. Lewis and Greaves formulated a new regime for EastEndrers, giving the writers of the serial more authority in storyline progression, with the script department providing "guidance rather than prescriptive episode storylines". By the end of 1992 Helen Greaves left the serial and Lewis became executive and series producer. Among the storylines that aired under Lewis' tenure are Arthur Fowler's affair with Christine Hewitt, Pat Butcher's drunk-driving crash, the death of Gill Fowler, Sharon Watts's affair with her brother-in-law Phil Mitchell, and the reintroduction of Cindy Beale. Other characters introduced include David Wicks, Mandy Salter, Richard Cole, Sanjay Kapoor, Christine Hewitt, Nigel Bates, Natalie Price and the Jackson family, while axings include Pete Beale, and some of Tavernier family. Lewis decided to leave EastEnders in 1994 after the BBC controllers demanded an extra episode a week, taking its weekly airtime from 1hr (two episodes), to 1.5hrs (three episodes). Lewis felt that producing an hour of "reasonable quality drama" a week was the maximum that any broadcasting system could generate without loss of integrity. Having set up the transition to the new schedule, the first trio of episodes – dubbed The Vic siege – marked Lewis' departure from the programme. He decided to retire in 1995.

== Personal life ==
Lewis was born on 29 November 1927, in Tottenham, North London, but moved to East Barnet when he was about seven. He was educated at the local grammar school, where he met his future wife, Jean. They married in 1950 and remained together til Lewis' death in 2005. He was a father to three daughters, Sian, Tessa and Maria.

Lewis and his wife retired to Somerset in 1995, where he remained active despite health problems. He had a keen interest in travelling, calligraphy and ice-cream making. He was also involved with his local community – three weeks before his death, his production of She Stoops to Conquer, for the South Petherton Drama Group, received "rave reviews". He died suddenly on 2 December 2005, aged 78.

== Selected filmography ==
- Z-Cars (1965)
- Adam Adamant Lives! (1966)
- Softly, Softly (1969–1974)
- Barlow at Large (1973)
- Jack the Ripper (1973)
- When the Boat Comes In (1976)
- Flambards (1979)
- The Good Companions (1980)
- The Chinese Detective (1982)
- Juliet Bravo (1981–83)
- Tales of the Unexpected (1983)
- The Prisoner of Zenda (1984)
- Brat Farrar (1986)
- Rockliffe's Babies (1987–88)
- The Franchise Affair (1988)
- EastEnders (1991–94)
- Doctor Who: Dimensions in Time (1993)

Media offices
Preceded by Pat Sandys	Executive Producer of EastEnders; 4 February 1992 – 11 April 1994	Succeeded by Barbara Emile
