= Jacquetta May =

British writer, actress and theatre director

Jacquetta May is a British actor, screenwriter, theatre director and producer.

== Early life ==
Born in Kent, she attended Tonbridge Grammar School for Girls, and the University of Bristol.

== Career ==
=== Acting ===
May joined EastEnders in 1991 for two years to play Rachel Kominski, Michelle Fowler's landlady and Mark Fowler's girlfriend. She went on to be a regular in Dangerfield (1996), Cardiac Arrest (1996), Four Fathers (1999) and Home Farm Twins (1999), and also appeared in Crocodile Shoes (1994), Peak Practice (2000), Down to Earth (2001), Cold Feet (2001), I'm Alan Partridge (2002), Holby City (2003), Silent Witness (2005), New Tricks (2011), The Bill and Casualty many times (1996–2012), Being Human (2010), Law & Order: UK (2010), Midsomer Murders (2021), The Killing Kind (2023) and Ridley (2022) with Adrian Dunbar, among others. She also appeared in the films Naked Cell (1988) and Get Real (1998).

=== Writing ===
May started writing for television at World Productions in 2000. She co-created UGetMe for CBBC, which ran for three series (2003–05), and wrote for No Angels (2006), Where the Heart Is (2000), Shades (2000), New Tricks (2006), Personal Affairs (2009), and for the first series of Torchwood (2006). Her film In Love with Barbara (2008) about the romantic novelist Barbara Cartland and her friendship with Lord Mountbatten of Burma, starring Anne Reid and David Warner, was broadcast on BBC Four in 2008. She adapted Erica Jong's novel Fear of Flying. May's legal thriller Lawless, starring Suranne Jones, Lindsay Duncan and Jonathan Cake, was piloted in 2012 on Sky Living. She wrote for two series of Living The Dream for Sky Comedy, starring Philip Glenister and Lesley Sharp (2017–2019).

=== Directing and producing ===
May co-founded the award-winning new writing theatre company Plain Clothes Productions, commissioning, producing and directing for the company, which toured the UK, and played the Traverse, the Bush Theatre, the Young Vic, and Battersea Arts Centre. She directed Her Sister's Tongue at Lyric Theatre Hammersmith in 1997 for the company. In 2019 she associate directed Brigit Forsyth in Killing Time, by Zoe Mills, at 59E59 Theaters, off-Broadway, New York.
