= Steven Woodcock =

British actor (b.1964)

- Born: 23 February 1964 (age 62)
- Occupations: Actor writer musician
- Years active: 1980–present
- Known for: EastEnders

Steven Woodcock (born 23 February 1964) is a British actor, best known for his role as Clyde Tavernier in the BBC soap opera EastEnders, a role that he played from July 1990 to July 1993.

Other television credits include Grange Hill (1983–1984), The Lenny Henry Show (1985), Casualty (1987), London's Burning, Rockliffe's Babies and Only Fools and Horses.

Steven started as a writer and one of his plays, Jah-Jah Reached The Top, was performed at London's Royal Court Theatre. A serious musician, he has composed over 500 songs and plays the guitar and bass professionally.

Steven was also once a keen boxer, a skill he used when his EastEnders character took up the sport on-screen in 1991.
