= Ian Reddington =

British actor (born 1957)

- Born: 25 September 1957 (age 69); Walkley, Sheffield, England
- Education: Royal Academy of Dramatic Art
- Occupation: Actor
- Years active: 1973–present
- Spouse: Lynda Ford (m. 2009)
- Children: 3

Ian Reddington (born 25 September 1957) is an English actor with many stage and television credits since the early 1980s. He became widely known for television roles such as the Chief Clown in the Doctor Who serial The Greatest Show in the Galaxy, Richard Cole in EastEnders and Vernon Tomlin in Coronation Street.

== Early life ==
Ian Reddington was born in Walkley in Sheffield. He was educated at Frecheville Comprehensive. Reddington then went on to study acting at the Royal Academy of Dramatic Art in London, graduating with Acting (RADA Diploma) in 1978.

== Career ==
=== Film ===
Although mostly known for his work on stage and in television, Reddington made his film debut as Bassett in Highlander in 1986, duelling with Christopher Lambert.

=== Television ===
Reddington's earliest television appearances were in Sharon and Elsie (1984), Doug Lucie's Hard Feelings in Play for Today (1984), Three Up, Two Down (1986) and Casualty (1987). In 1989, he was voted Best Villain of the 25th anniversary season by Doctor Who Magazine readers for his portrayal of the Chief Clown in the serial The Greatest Show in the Galaxy, which starred Sylvester McCoy as the Seventh Doctor. In 2015, author Cameron K. McEwan described it as "a superb performance and, still to this day, one of Who's finest villains". Reddington reprised this role for the Big Finish audio drama The Psychic Circus in 2020.

Between 1992 and 1994, he had a recurring role as Richard Cole (aka Tricky Dicky) in EastEnders. He later became one of only two actors to portray a major role in the UK's two biggest soap operas (the other being Michelle Collins) after his portrayal of Vernon Tomlin, the hapless drummer, in Coronation Street from 2005 until 2008.

His many other television appearances have included episodes of The Bill, Boon, Holby City, Benidorm, Doctors, Peak Practice, Playing the Field, Robin Hood, Inspector Morse and Cadfael, The Sculptress, The Queen's Nose, Jane Hall, and Yellow Thread Street and memorably as Tommy the council worker in Shameless, Snap, and Being April.

In 2017, he appeared in the BBC series Father Brown, as Samuel Jacobs in the fifth-season episode "The Penitent Man", and played Harry Tomkins in the third season of Outlander. In December 2021, alongside son Tyler Reddington, he portrayed the role of Frankie Clitheroe in Doctors.

=== Theatre ===
Reddington's theatre work started in 1978 with the Royal Shakespeare Company. He played Master Froth in Measure for Measure, The Tailor in Play of the Year, The Taming of the Shrew, a 'shape' in The Tempest, The Churchill Play, The Shepherds Play, the multi-award-winning Piaf, and RSC West End theatre productions of Wild Oats, and Once in a Lifetime. He then went to the Bristol Old Vic to play Kent in Edward the Second and Oh! What A Lovely War. In repertory theatre, he played leading roles at Plymouth, in the British première of The Dynasts, and at Nottingham in Cain.

For Great Eastern Stage he performed in Travesties. Back at the Bristol Old Vic he appeared in Androcles and The Lion, and She Stoops To Conquer, and in The Woman Who Cooked Her Husband for Nottingham Playhouse. Then to The Citizen's Theatre, Glasgow where he was seen in world premières of Judith, and Saint Joan. In London's fringe he played the title role in Arden of Faversham at the Old Red Lion Theatre, Alec D'Urbaville in Tess at The Latchmere. Also there he performed The Promise with his own company One Word, The Collector at The Spice of Life and Rutherford and Son at The New End. At The Bush Theatre he appeared in Hard Feelings and Flamingoes, Black Mas for Foco Novo and Pamela for Shared Experience. He performed in A Who's Who of Flapland for Lakeside, Nottingham, and world premieres of In Pursuit of the English and Hangover Square at The Lyric Hammersmith.

He worked with English experimental company Lumiere and Son in War Dance and then performed in Italy with La Zattere Di Babele in Tamburlaine. Further classical work saw him perform Hamlet for the Oxford Stage Company, Richard the Third for the Stafford Festival and Macbeth in London. For the International New Writers Festival in Birmingham he appeared in Car Thieves and a performance of A Day in the Death of Joe Egg at The Royal National Theatre. He has also been seen in Blue Murder, Happy as A Sandbag, Dead Funny, Gasping and The Woman in Black. For the West Yorkshire Playhouse, he appeared in The Lemon Princess.

He played the part of Joe's dad in the Olivier Award-winning musical Our House. He played Pop in the musical We Will Rock You in 2011.

He has adapted for the stage John Fowles's The Collector and – with Paul Bower – Ramón del Valle-Inclán's Luces de Bohemia.

== Personal life ==
Reddington married Lynda Ford on 18 October 2009 in Sheffield. He is a supporter of the Bobby Moore Fund, which raises money for research into bowel cancer and is also a patron of Ali's Dream and Brain Tumour Research. He was guest star at one of the first Wii charity tennis events to be held in the United Kingdom. He is an active participant and supporter of the National Student Drama Festival.

Reddington is a supporter of the Labour Party and was involved in the planning campaign for the South Northamptonshire Labour candidate Sophie Johnson in the 2017 UK general election, which included helping to make her election video. He is also a lifelong supporter of Sheffield Wednesday F.C.

== Filmography ==
- Highlander (1986) – Bassett
- Crimestrike (1990)
- Who Needs a Heart (1991) – Jack
- Speak Like a Child (1998) – Master
- The Adventurer: The Curse of the Midas Box (2013) – Ratchit
- The Spiritualist (2016) – Father
- Fanged Up (2017) – Francis the Bus Driver
- The Sisters Brothers (2018) – The Father
- Kaleidoscope Man (2018) – Gerry Miller

== Discography ==
For Sheffield Wednesday F.C. he has written and recorded :
"Move on up for steel city" – The Hillsborough Crew
"If it's Wednesday it must be Wembley" – The Hillsborough Crew (Blue Wave SWFCP1)
"Oh yes" – The Wednesday Kop Band (Blue Wave Kop Band 1)
"Euromania" – Elevenveeeleven (Cherry Red Records cdgaffer6)
