= Nicola Stapleton =

English actress (born 1974)

- Born: Nicola Kathleen Stapleton; 9 August 1974 (age 52); Elephant and Castle, London, England
- Education: Sylvia Young Theatre School
- Occupation: Actress
- Years active: 1983–present
- Known for: Mandy Salter in EastEnders; Danielle Hutch in Emmerdale
- Children: 1

Nicola Kathleen Stapleton (born 9 August 1974) is an English actress. She is best known for her roles in EastEnders as Mandy Salter and Emmerdale as Danielle Hutch. A graduate of the Sylvia Young Theatre School, Stapleton began her career at an early age, appearing in films such as Hansel and Gretel and on television in the children's show Simon and the Witch in 1987.

In 1992, she secured a high-profile role on British television as Mandy Salter in the BBC soap opera EastEnders. In 1994, Stapleton quit the role, but in 2011, returned to the role after 17 years. In 2012, she left the role for a second time.

Stapleton's other notable television roles include that of Janine Nebeski in ITV's Bad Girls (2005–06) and Joe Nardone in Channel 4's Young Person's Guide to Becoming a Rock Star (1998).

In 2017, she joined Thomas & Friends as the voice of Rosie, taking over from Teresa Gallagher in the UK and Jules de Jongh in the US. 28 October 2017 marked Stapleton's third appearance in Casualty playing her third different character in the show.

== Early life ==
Stapleton was raised near East Street, which runs east to west between the Old Kent Road and Walworth Road in Walworth, south London. She and her younger brother Vince were born to working class parents: a Scottish mother, Kate, a cleaner, and English father, Vincent Stapleton, who ran a car hire business.

She attended the Townsend Primary School in south-east London, where her parents were advised by a teacher "to channel her energy into something positive." As a result, they sent her to the Corona Theatre School and Sylvia Young Theatre School, where Denise Van Outen and her future EastEnders co-stars Danniella Westbrook and Samantha Janus were among her contemporaries.

== Career ==
=== Early career ===
Stapleton's career in showbusiness started when she was six, and at the age of eight, she had a minor role as an extra in the James Bond film Octopussy (1983). She made her TV debut in the detective series Dempsey and Makepeace (ITV), in 1985 and she went on to have roles in feature films such as Little Shop of Horrors (Geffen Pictures, 1986); Hansel and Gretel (MGM, 1987); Snow White (MGM, 1987) and Courage Mountain (Paramount, 1990).

At aged 12, she played the part of Sally in the 1987 Children's BBC production Simon and the Witch. She also had a minor role in the BBC sitcom Bread.

=== EastEnders ===
Stapleton is perhaps best known for her role as the wayward Mandy Salter in the BBC soap opera EastEnders, which she played from 1992 to 1994. During her time in the soap, Stapleton's character was featured in storylines about child and drug abuse, homelessness and prostitution.

Her EastEnders character was also featured in a special episode of the science fiction series Doctor Who, which was entitled Dimensions in Time (1993). The episode was specially screened as part of BBC's annual fund-raising event Children in Need. Viewers were asked to phone in and vote which EastEnders character, Mandy or 'Big' Ron, would appear in the show. Two versions were filmed for each voting outcome, but the Mandy version won with 56% of the vote. Stapleton grew tired of all the attention she received from being in such a high-profile show, so she resigned from the role in 1994.

In 2005, in an interview, Stapleton commented: "Working on EastEnders was so high-profile it put me off working on soaps for a while… I've been asked a number of times to go back, but I've done a lot of really credible stuff in theatre, and I thought, 'It took me a long time get here. I'm not ready to go back to Mandy just yet'… The publicity with something regarding EastEnders is huge, and sometimes you end up feeling like a famous person rather than an actress - I wanted my work to be more fulfilling than that."

In June 2011, Stapleton announced that she would be returning to EastEnders after a 17-year hiatus, and she reappeared as Mandy in an episode broadcast in August that year. Stapleton left the role for a second time at the end of her contract, with Mandy departing in May 2012.

=== Other roles ===
Stapleton's subsequent TV credits have included: You Bet! (ITV, 1993); The Thin Blue Line (BBC, 1995); The Bill (ITV, 2002); Casualty (BBC, 1999) and Casualty@Holby City (2004); Harry Enfield and Chums (BBC); Audrey and Friends (2000); Brinks Mat: The Greatest Heist (2003); and Jane Hall (ITV, 2006), among others.

She has also appeared in feature films including: Urban Ghost Story (Living Spirit Pictures, 1998); The Killing Zone (1999); It Was an Accident (2000); South West Nine (2001); Goodbye Charlie Bright (2001); Lava (2002) and Chunky Monkey (2001). On stage, she played the role of Peter Pan in a musical version of the J.M. Barrie novel, which she then toured the United Kingdom, alongside actors Terence Donovan and Laurence Mark Wythe, who later become a composer and lyricist in musical theatre.

In 1994, she provided the voice of the popular comic character Minnie the Minx from The Beano in The Beano Videostars, taking over the role from Susan Sheridan (who was the original voice of Minnie in The Beano Video), although Sheridan voiced additional characters in other Beano segments.

In 1998, she was cast in Channel 4's successful Young Person's Guide to Becoming a Rock Star. She played Joe Nardone, a sex-mad guitarist in a Scottish band, which goes from playing pubs to netting a record deal via a string of wild parties. In 2002, Stapleton guest-starred in her first of two roles of ITV1's cop show The Bill, She played tough-talking young mum Tina Pope, who eventually becomes the second victim of the Sun Hill Serial Killer.

Stapleton is more recently known for playing prisoner Janine Nebeski in the seventh and eighth series of ITV prison drama Bad Girls (2005–06). In the final series, her character embarked on a romance with male prison officer Donny Kimber who was played by her ex-EastEnders co-star Sid Owen.

On 4 November 2006, the Stapleton family appeared on Celebrity Family Fortunes, headed by Nicola and that same month, Stapleton guest-starred in the ITV police drama The Bill, her second role in the programme to date. She acted alongside Birds of a Feather star Linda Robson to form a drug-addicted mother-daughter duo. She played the role of Louise Parker in the 2007 Lynda La Plante televised mini-series The Commander: The Devil You Know, and appeared in BBC's The Last Enemy in 2008.

On stage, Stapleton has appeared in Cockroach Who at The National Theatre; Of Mice and Men, which toured the United Kingdom; Scissor Happy at the Duchess Theatre (1997); Essex Girls; Corner Boys; and Four Star Hotel; all were shown at the Royal Court Theatre. Stapleton also appeared on a television Goodies/Baddies special of Weakest Link. She was the 6th one voted off.

In August 2008, it was announced that she would play the role of Eli Dingle's friend Danielle Hutch on the soap opera Emmerdale; her first scene aired in September 2008. Stapleton said of her role: "Danielle is such an intriguing character because there's more to her than meets the eye. I'm really looking forward to starting filming and I think viewers can expect some interesting encounters as we explore the relationship between Danielle and Eli." Emmerdale series producer Anita Turner added: "I'm so pleased to welcome an actress with Nicola's calibre to the show. Eli likes to manipulate people, but Danielle is a different proposition and she'll definitely get under his skin."

In September 2009, Stapleton appeared in Channel 4's Hollyoaks Later, as the friend of Cindy Cunningham called Savannah. In October 2009, Nicola appeared in the UK Film Council funded short film Hands Solo, a mockumentary about the world's most famous deaf porn star.

Aside from lending her voice to Thomas & Friends, Stapleton has also provided voice talents to the video games Assassin's Creed Syndicate, Assassin's Creed Syndicate: Jack the Ripper and Ni no Kuni II: Revenant Kingdom in which she voiced Ratja in the English version.

== Personal life ==
In October 2001, Stapleton's father was jailed for his part in an £11 million VAT computer-chip fraud. Her brother was also fined £10,000, for helping in the fraudulent business, which involved importing VAT-exempt microchips from EU countries and selling them to firms with added VAT, before claiming money back from Customs and Excise. Nicola Stapleton provided the £125,000 bail, for her brother during the trial.

In September 2005, Mr Stapleton was eventually told by the Court of Appeal to pay a confiscation order of £1.6 million. In July 2008, Nicola Stapleton battled against the Customs Prosecution Office at the High Court in order to keep her property in South Norwood, which she had purchased from her father for £175,000 before his imprisonment for fraud.

The prosecution claimed that the house had originally been purchased from "ill-gotten gains", and wanted to seize the property as part of the confiscation order. Stapleton maintains that she bought the property out of her earnings as an actress in 2000. The court found in favour of Nicola Stapleton. In January 2014, she gave birth to her first child (with fiancé David Luck), a son.

== Filmography ==
=== Film ===
Year	Title	Role	Notes
1983	Octopussy	Little Girl at Circus	Uncredited
1987	Snow White	Young Snow White	
1987	Hansel and Gretel	Gretel	
1990	Courage Mountain	Ilsa	
1994	The Beano Videostars	Minnie the Minx	Voice
1995	A Fistful of Fingers	Floozy	
1998	Ladies & Gentlemen	Unnamed	Short film
1998	Urban Ghost Story	Kerrie	
1999	Dead on Time	Briana	Short film
1999	The Killing Zone	Kerry Wyman	
2000	It Was an Accident	Kelly	
2001	Chunky Monkey	Mandy	
2001	Goodbye Charlie Bright	Julie	
2001	Lava	Julie	
2001	South West 9	Sal	
2009	Hands Solo	Bunny Comeley	Short film
2014	Bypass	Samantha	
2017	Thomas & Friends: Journey Beyond Sodor	Rosie	Voice
2018	Thomas & Friends: Big World Big Adventures!	Rosie	Voice

=== Television ===
Year	Title	Role	Notes
1985	Dempsey and Makepeace	Debbie	Episode: "Hors de Combat"
1987–1988	Simon and the Witch	Sally	11 episodes
1988	Hannay	Betty	Episode: "Act of riot"
1992–1994, 2011–2012	EastEnders	Mandy Salter	Series regular, 176 episodes
1993	Doctor Who: Dimensions in Time	Mandy Salter	Charity special crossover between Doctor Who and EastEnders
1995	The Thin Blue Line	Natalie	Episode: "Kids Today"
1997	Harry Enfield and Chums	Sam	Episode #2.6
1998	The Young Person's Guide to Becoming a Rock Star	Joe Nardone	TV series
1999	Casualty	Kay Larcombe	Episode: "Love Over Gold: Part 1"; Episode: "Love Over Gold: Part 2"
2000	Audrey and Friends	Audrey	TV series, pilot only
2003	Secret History	Kathy Meacock	Episode: "Brinks Mat: The Greatest Heist - Part 2"
2004	Gaby & the Girls	Donna	TV series
2004	Casualty	Shirley Smith	Episode: "Casualty @ Holby City: Part 1"
2004	Holby City	Shirley Smith	Episode: "Casualty @ Holby City: Part 2"
2005–2006	Bad Girls	Janine Nebeski	24 episodes
2006	Jane Hall	Steph	Episode #1.4
2007	The Commander: The Devil You Know	Louise Parker	TV film
2008	The Last Enemy	Caroline Scott	Episode #1.3
2008–2009	Emmerdale	Danielle Hutch	14 episodes
2009	Hollyoaks Later	Savannah Madeiros	5 episodes
2017	White Gold	Gillian	
2017–2020	Thomas & Friends	Rosie	Seasons 21 to 24, succeeding Teresa Gallagher and Jules de Jongh
2017	Casualty	Dawn Chambers	Series 32 Episode 10
2020	London Kills	Amy Fisher	Episode: "The Ultimate Price"

=== Video games ===
Year	Title	Role	Notes
2015	Assassin's Creed Syndicate	Additional Voices	Voice
2015	Assassin's Creed Syndicate: Jack the Ripper	London Civilian	Voice
2018	Ni no Kuni II: Revenant Kingdom	Ratja	Voice, English version

Radio

- Time Hops (BBC, 1994) (5 episodes) [Science Fiction, rerun on BBC Radio 4 Extra, 2012]
