= List of EastEnders characters introduced in 1987 =

EastEnders logo

The following is a list of characters that first appeared in the BBC soap opera EastEnders in 1987, by order of first appearance.

== Tina Hopkins ==
Tina Hopkins
- EastEnders character
- Portrayed by: Eleanor Rhodes
- First appearance: Episode 207; 5 February 1987
- Last appearance: Episode 269; 10 September 1987
In-universe information
- Occupation: Student
- Father: Keith Hopkins
- Mother: Mrs Hopkins

Tina Hopkins, played by Eleanor Rhodes, is introduced as Ian Beale's (Adam Woodyatt) girlfriend in February 1987. Ian's friend Kelvin Carpenter (Paul J. Medford) takes a romantic interest in Tina and makes advances towards her, which she shuns.

Tina gets a job working at Naima Jeffery's (Shreela Ghosh) grocery store, the First til Last, and by May 1987 she and Ian decide that they want to move in together. They manage to persuade Kelvin to rent them one of his father's flats. Tina and Ian get the required consent from their parents and although their parents are unhappy with it, they move in together. Tina and Ian struggle to pay the rent and when money goes missing from Tina's workplace, Naima accuses her of stealing it, when in fact it was a friend of Mary Smith's (Linda Davidson) named Sandra. Rod Norman (Christopher McHallem) helps clear Tina's name by setting a trap for the real thief.

Shortly after, Tina's parents visit and let themselves into the flat. They are horrified to discover that it is messy. When they discover that Simon Wicks (Nick Berry) and Magda Czajkowski (Kathryn Apanowicz) live next door in an adjoining room, they decide that Tina cannot stay there. Despite Tina's protests, they pack her bags and insist she move back to Ilford with them.

Tina is mentioned in 2008, when Ian tells his stepson Steven Beale (Aaron Sidwell) that he lost his virginity to her.

== Emine Osman ==
Emine Osman
- EastEnders character
- Portrayed by: Pelin Ahmet
- Duration: 1987–1988
- First appearance: Episode 213; 26 February 1987
- Last appearance: Episode 328; 29 March 1988
In-universe information
- Occupation: Student
- Father: Mehmet Osman
- Mother: Guizin Osman
- Brothers: Rayif Osman; Murat Osman
- Uncles: Ali Osman
- Aunts: Ayse Osman
- First cousins: Hassan Osman; Little Ali Osman

Emine Osman, played by Pelin Ahmet, is the daughter of Mehmet (Haluk Bilginer) and Guizin Osman (Ishia Bennison). She is first seen on screen in February 1987. Her father gambles away their home and then disappears, so Emine, her mother, and her two brothers, Murat (Ediz Izzet) and Rayif (Billy Hassan), are forced to move in with Mehmet's brother Ali (Nejdet Salih) and his wife Sue (Sandy Ratcliff).

Emine and her siblings play pranks and get into trouble, often letting their pet boa constrictor (named Crush) loose to scare the residents of the Square. The Osman children later become friendly with Luke (Henry Power) and Sophie Willmott-Brown (Natasha Knight). They move out of the Square in May that year when their father returns, but occasionally show up on the Square to cause more trouble for their parents.

In November 1987, Guizin hears that Emine has been injured by a firework, in a storyline that hoped to highlight the dangers of children playing with fireworks. Emine's last appearance is in March 1988, but after her parents have a huge argument, Emine and the rest of her family move to Northern Cyprus in March 1989.

== Rayif Osman ==
Rayif Osman
- EastEnders character
- Portrayed by: Billy Hassan
- Duration: 1987–1988
- First appearance: Episode 213; 26 February 1987
- Last appearance: Episode 328; 29 March 1988
In-universe information
- Occupation: Student
- Father: Mehmet Osman
- Mother: Guizin Osman
- Brothers: Murat Osman
- Sisters: Emine Osman
- Uncles: Ali Osman
- Aunts: Ayse Osman
- First cousins: Hassan Osman; Little Ali Osman

Rayif Osman, played by Billy Hassan, is the elder son of Mehmet (Haluk Bilginer) and Guizin Osman (Ishia Bennison). He is first seen on screen in February 1987. Rayif, his mother, sister Emine (Pelin Ahmet) and brother Murat (Ediz Izzet) are all forced to move in with Mehmet's brother Ali (Nejdet Salih) and his wife Sue (Sandy Ratcliff), after Mehmet gambles away their home and then disappears.

Rayif and his siblings play pranks and get into trouble, often letting their pet boa constrictor (named Crush) loose to scare the residents of the Square. They also have a penchant for playing on arcade games and fruit machines, and they occasionally sneak away to play on them against their mother's wishes.

The Osman children later become friendly with Luke (Henry Power) and Sophie Willmott-Brown (Natasha Knight). They move out of the Square in May that year when their father returns, but occasionally show up on the Square to cause more trouble for their parents.

Rayif's last appearance is in March 1988, but after his parents have an argument, Rayif and the rest of his family move to Northern Cyprus in March 1989.

== Murat Osman ==
Murat Osman
- EastEnders character
- Portrayed by: Ediz Izzet
- Duration: 1987–1988
- First appearance: Episode 213; 26 February 1987
- Last appearance: Episode 328; 29 March 1988
In-universe information
- Father: Mehmet Osman
- Mother: Guizin Osman
- Brothers: Rayif Osman
- Sisters: Emine Osman
- Uncles: Ali Osman
- Aunts: Ayse Osman
- First cousins: Hassan Osman; Little Ali Osman

Murat Osman, played by Ediz Izzet, is the son of Mehmet (Haluk Bilginer) and Guizin Osman (Ishia Bennison). He is first seen on screen in February 1987 after his father gambles away their home and then disappears, so Murat, his mother, sister Emine (Pelin Ahmet) and brother Rayif (Billy Hassan), are forced to move in with Mehmet's brother Ali (Nejdet Salih) and his wife Sue (Sandy Ratcliff). Murat is the youngest of the three children.

Murat and his siblings play pranks and get into trouble, often letting their pet boa constrictor (named Crush) loose to scare the residents of the Square. The Osman children later become friendly with Luke (Henry Power) and Sophie Willmott-Brown (Natasha Knight). They move out of the Square in May that year when their father returns, but occasionally show up on the Square to cause more trouble for their parents.

Murat's last appearance is in March 1988, but after his parents have an argument, Murat and the rest of his family move to Northern Cyprus in March 1989.

== Fi Browning ==
Fi Browning
- EastEnders character
- Portrayed by: Natasha Knight (1987, 1992); Lisa Faulkner (2017)
- Duration: 1987, 1992, 2017
- First appearance: Episode 222; 31 March 1987
- Last appearance: Episode 5626; 28 December 2017
- Introduced by: Julia Smith (1987); Leonard Lewis (1992); Sean O'Connor (2017)
In-universe information
- Other names: Sophie Willmott-Brown
- Occupation: Student; Business consultant
- Father: James Willmott-Brown
- Mother: Elizabeth Willmott-Brown
- Brothers: Luke Browning
- Half-brothers: Josh Hemmings
- Uncles: Hugo Browning

Sophie "Fi" Browning (also Willmott-Brown), played by Natasha Knight in 1987 and 1992, and Lisa Faulkner in 2017, first appeared in the episode broadcast on 31 March 1987, is the daughter of James Willmott-Brown (William Boyde). Faulkner revealed that she would be departing the show when Boyde reprised his role of James Willmott-Brown and made her final appearance on 28 December 2017.

Sophie and her brother, Luke Willmott-Brown (Henry Power) visit their father in March 1987, but return to living with their mother in July. During their stay, they become friendly with Emine Osman (Pelin Ahmet), Rayif Osman (Billy Hassan) and Murat Osman (Eddie Izzet). They return for a guest appearance following James's release from prison in January 1992.

In April 2017, she returns to Walford under the alias Fi Browning as a business consultant employed by Grafton Hill, the new freeholders of The Queen Victoria, in an attempt to understand and improve the business. Upon arriving at Albert Square, she finds Lady Di wandering the square alone and whilst trying to locate her owner is accused by Shirley Carter (Linda Henry) of dognapping. Fi and Shirley meet again shortly later when Fi enters The Vic just as Shirley opens a bottle of champagne, which accidentally soaks Fi. Fi dries herself and introduces herself to the workforce, immediately telling Shirley and Woody Woodward (Lee Ryan) they have too many staff and need to cut back. The Carters think Woody should leave, Fi insists that Grafton Hill want him to remain, so acting bar manager Sharon Mitchell (Letitia Dean) and barmaid Tracey (Jane Slaughter) are ultimately sacked, leaving Tracey devastated. Fi returns to The Vic during a celebration of Tracey's time working there, but she wonders why they are prolonging Tracey's agony, though Shirley says it is bringing in customers. Tracey does not turn up, though, and the customers decide to boycott the pub until she is reinstated. Fi meets The Vic landlord, Mick Carter (Danny Dyer), when he returns from Bulgaria. Mick later has a meeting with Fi and she tells him that The Vic is a good pub and that it has charm, just like him, and she says that they need a permanent replacement for Whitney Dean (Shona McGarty), who has left. Fi later suggests to Mick that they should have more younger staff to boost customers and suggests a two-for-one Father's Day meal for the Vic. Fi and Shirley clash over their ideas for the Father's Day meal. Fi arrives when Mick is preparing for his wife Linda Carter's (Kellie Bright) 40th birthday party, and is serving customers when Linda arrives. Linda does not know who she is, but when she finds out, Linda accuses Fi of sacking Tracey but Fi tells Linda that she wants to improve the pub. Linda tells Mick that she does not trust Fi. The following day, Fi brings in craft ale beers for a special event later in the week, which Fi and Mick sample. Fi, Mick and Shirley then conduct interviews for a new staff member, and although Tracey applies, Mick chooses Stacey Fowler (Lacey Turner), which Fi agrees with. Fi tells Mick that Shirley should be sacked as she is stealing from the till and taking drinks without paying. Mick reluctantly agrees and when Fi leaves the Vic, it is revealed that she and Max Branning (Jake Wood) are in a relationship and she is in on his revenge plan, allowing him to have sex with council worker Carmel Kazemi (Bonnie Langford) to access council documents. Fi overhears Carmel talking to Linda about the council. She then watches Max get more information about the council from Carmel and Denise Fox (Diane Parish). She then follows Max to the bathroom where they have sex in a toilet stall which was overheard by Steven Beale (Aaron Sidwell). When Max tells Fi that he feels guilty about using Carmel, Fi tells him that he needs a backbone. Fi accuses Shirley of taking £200 from the till but Mick confesses that it was him who had taken £200 to pay Whitney. When Linda gives Keanu Taylor (Danny Walters) a trial shift, Fi is not impressed and she sends him home. Linda then confronts Fi and she confides in Fi about the breakdown of her relationship with Mick. Fi tells Linda that she hopes that her and Linda would be friends and that she knows what Linda is going through. Fi becomes annoyed with the Carters when they begin to undermine her by giving Tracey her job back, bringing back Ladies night, and refusing to get rid of the piano. When Fi decides to attend Ladies night she questions Carmel about her relationship with Max, and attempts to bond with the other ladies by buying them all Champagne, and later congratulates Linda on the evening. Fi helps to plan for the Walford in Bloom event on the square, and later becomes upset when Max chooses to cancel plans with her in order to go to a council party with Carmel instead.

Mick is suspicious when Fi begins acting strangely and ordering wine in the middle of the day. After being questioned, she reveals that it is the anniversary of her mother's death which she later explains was a suicide. She tells Mick about the day that she went home and found her mother's body and he applauds her for being brave enough to share such a personal story with him. Fi misreads the signals and attempts to kiss Mick who gently rebuffs her. She then calls Josh Hemmings (Eddie Eyre) to arrange a meet-up. When Fi makes a speech at Walford In Bloom, she is drunk and she stumbles through her speech. Fi continues to open up about her past with Mick at her home and they have a heart to heart but despite telling Mick that her father has died, she secretly calls him. 25 years later, James anonymously lays flowers addressed to Kathy at a memorial for her step-grandson Steven Beale (Aaron Sidwell). The following day, James meets with his children — Fi, who turns out to be Sophie, Luke (now Adam Astill) and Josh — and Fi's uncle Hugo Browning (Simon Williams), before introducing himself to Fi's partner, Max. The Carters are given a £60,000 repair bill for The Vic and Fi pretends to defend the Carters in front of Luke. Fi promises James that she will get the sealed bids from Max and Luke promises to persuade Jay Brown (Jamie Borthwick) to sell the car lot land, though Luke doubts Fi's abilities. When Max contemplates getting the sealed bids from Carmel's work laptop, he phones James, refusing to go through with it. Max meets up with James, Fi and Luke and tells them that he doesn't want Carmel to be involved in their plan any longer. Fi turns up to see Max at Carmel's house, where they have sex. However, unbeknownst to Max, Fi accesses Carmel's computer and steals the sealed bids. When James finds out about Max and Fi's relationship, Fi presents him with the sealed bids to earn James's approval, declaring her and Max are a fling. A disappointed Max ends his relationship with Fi, despite her telling him she wants to be with him. When the Carters are given a 5-week deadline to pay the bill, Fi gives the Carter's the option of selling the leasehold, but they refuse. After Hugo insults them about their personal lives and handling of the business over the course of the year, the Carters realise only Fi could have told him the information, realising she's been lying to them about her intentions for months. Linda throws a drink in Fi's face before her and Hugo are ejected from the pub. When Carmel is suspended from her job pending investigation because of sealed bids being accessed by an unknown person, Max contacts Fi and tells her what has happened. Fi and Max make amends and suggests to her that she takes £10,000 off the repairs bill to get the Carters on her side. The Carters accept her help to raise the money. Fi catches Luke throttling Josh and breaks them up and Josh is hurt that Fi is in on Project Dagmar whilst he is excluded. When Carmel finds a ring at her house left behind by Max, she thinks Max will propose and invites people to The Vic. Fi finds out that the Carters have raised £50,000 and when Max arrive, the pair kiss and Carmel is devastated whilst people turn on Max. James, Luke and Hugo later arrive and James tells them they own Grafton Hill. They serve the Carters with an eviction notice, putting up the money owed to the original amount £60,000. James reveals that they plan to turn their obtained buildings into luxury flats. When Max proposes to Fi, James and Luke reveal that they have used him as they have doubted his loyalty and burn his cheque. Kathy confronts Fi over what James did to her and about all the women James has destroyed, including her own mother. Whilst James and Fi attend a press launch, Josh downloads files that can get the development stopped and Lauren gets arresting when she stages a protest at the launch to hold James and Fi up. When James returns, Lauren contacts Josh and James demands the downloaded files, so Josh decides to quit his job. Fi tries to get Josh to return, but he tells Fi that James has ruined and controls their lives just like with their mothers. When Fi attempts to question James over why he never allowed Josh's mother Wendy to get a job or why Elizabeth committed suicide, James pushes her to the ground. Fi asks Kathy about the rape and her version causes Fi to be physically sick. When James shows Fi documents that could ruin him, Fi says she believes he did rape Kathy, causing James to throw her out. After reconciling with Max and confiding in him her inability to see her father for who he is until too late, Fi sneaks into James' office, trashes it and steals most of the documents. James suffers a heart attack while trying to destroy the remaining evidence pointing to him before the police arrest him and Fi threatens Hugo with the files into signing the company deeds to her. Fi visits Mick and Linda and offers them a chance to buy back the freehold for the Vic for £150,000. Linda rejects this offer, calling it unrealistic and telling her that her family will get their comeuppance. Fi agrees and leaves Walford after visiting Kathy with a letter giving her the cafe back. Fi visits James in hospital, telling him she is not going to keep on trying to get his approval as she wanted his love. As James reaches out for Fi, she tells staff that she is not his daughter and walks out on him for good. Off-screen, Fi later agrees to give The Vic back to Mick and Linda in exchange for a diamond ring, worth £200,000.

Fi is described as a "no-nonsense but sophisticated business woman with strength and vulnerability." Executive producer Sean O'Connor said, "I'm really thrilled that we have been able to tempt Lisa Faulkner back to TV drama and back to the BBC. She's an extremely accomplished and hugely popular actress and we're very excited to have her in Albert Square. Fi Browning is something of a departure for EastEnders; a no-nonsense but sophisticated business woman with strength and vulnerability. But does she have an agenda? And who—or what—has she set her sights on?" In August 2017, Faulkner was longlisted for Best Bad Girl at the Inside Soap Awards, while the revelation that Fi is associated with Max was longlisted for Best Shock Twist. She did not progress to the viewer-voted shortlist.

William Boyde reprised his role as James Willmott-Brown following a 25-year absence in September 2017 and Fi was revealed to be his daughter Sophie. Faulkner enjoyed working with Boyde and described him as "lovely". Faulkner was told about Fi's real identity upon meeting the show bosses and found the story and Fi's background "so exciting". She felt she could not reject the role, although she was ordered not to inform anyone about Fi's identity. The actress revealed that at the conclusion of the storyline, which she said had "a beginning, middle and end", Fi would be leaving the serial.

== Luke Browning ==
Luke Browning
- EastEnders character
- Portrayed by: Henry Power (1987); Uncredited (1992); Adam Astill (2017)
- Duration: 1987, 1992, 2017
- First appearance: Episode 222; 31 March 1987
- Last appearance: Episode 5610; 5 December 2017
- Introduced by: Julia Smith (1987); Leonard Lewis (1992); Sean O'Connor (2017)
In-universe information
- Other names: Luke Willmott-Brown
- Occupation: Student; Associate Director of Weyland & Co
- Father: James Willmott-Brown
- Mother: Elizabeth Willmott-Brown
- Sisters: Fi Browning
- Half-brothers: Josh Hemmings
- Uncles: Hugo Browning

Luke Browning (also Willmott-Brown), played by Henry Power in 1987, an uncredited actor in 1992, and Adam Astill in 2017, first appeared in the episode broadcast on 31 March 1987. He is the son of James Willmott-Brown (William Boyde) and his first wife, Elizabeth Willmott-Brown (Helena Breck).

Luke and his sister, Sophie Willmott-Brown (Natasha Knight) visit their father in March 1987, but return to their mother in July. During their stay, they become friendly with Emine Osman (Pelin Ahmet), Rayif Osman (Billy Hassan) and Murat Osman (Eddie Izzet). They return for a guest appearance, following James's release from prison in January 1992.

In 2017, Luke's uncle, Hugo Browning (Simon Williams), gives Max Branning (Jake Wood) a visiting order and Max visits Luke, his former cellmate. When he is released from prison, Max picks him up and takes him home, where he is reunited with his sister, going by the name Fi Browning (now Lisa Faulkner), his half-brother Josh Hemmings (Eddie Eyre) and his father. Luke, James and Hugo discuss purchasing the café and James tells Luke and Hugo he has a better plan for the premises than their idea of studio flats. Luke carries out an unannounced inspection at The Queen Victoria and tells Shirley about the damage. Luke meets Kathy's younger son, Ben Mitchell (Harry Reid) outside the cafe when Ben accidentally spilled coffee on Luke's suit. Luke and Ben never knew their identity to each other at first. Luke meets Ben again when Ben is having a drink with his foster brother, Jay Brown (Jamie Borthwick) and their friend, Donna Yates (Lisa Hammond) at The Vic. Ben and Luke end up at The Arches and kiss. Luke, James and Hugo go through their development plans for Albert Square. Luke decides to meet Ben's father, Phil Mitchell (Steve McFadden) and stepmother Sharon Mitchell (Letitia Dean). Luke left, horrified after discovering Kathy is Ben's mother, when he met her. Ben publicly confronts Luke at work before dumping him. Luke tells Hugo that Ben is Kathy's son.

Luke meets Ben to ask him for another chance. Luke tells Ben he has been released from prison after four years and Ben tells Luke he served twenty months in youth custody for manslaughter. Luke tells James that he and Ben are back together on his request and questions James's interest in Ben and Kathy. Fi promises James that she will get the sealed bids from Max and Luke promises to persuade Jay to sell the car lot land, though Luke doubts Fi's abilities. Luke offers Jay £150,000 for the car lot, which Jay declines, but Luke gives him money. When Jay finds out about his foster father Billy Mitchell (Perry Fenwick) is having financial troubles, Jay accepts Luke's £200,000 offer. Luke attends Ben's half-sister's, Louise Mitchell (Tilly Keeper), birthday meal to make sure Phil knows nothing about James seeing Kathy on Halloween, thinking Kathy would tell him. Luke phones James and tells him that Phil is unaware. Kathy confides in Ian that James is back and Ian tells Phil. Phil visits James and realises Luke is James's son when he sees a photo of them. Phil tells Kathy that Luke is James's son and Phil fails to warn Luke off Ben. Ben is angry with Phil for what he did and when Kathy tries to get Ben and Phil to make up, Kathy tells Ben that Phil was protecting him as James raped her. After struggling to process what he is told, Ben is determined to hurt James, but Kathy orders Ben to keep out of it as it happened to her and not him. The next day, Ben confronts Luke with what he has been told and Luke tells Ben that James wants to meet him.

Ben come face to face with James in his office and threatens him with a crowbar but Luke stops Ben from hurting James. The next day, Luke worries that Ben will break up with him as Ben initially decides to end their relationship, due to their parents' history but changes his mind after a heart to heart with Kathy. Kathy is alarmed when Luke grabs her wrist. The next day, Luke is furious with Ben when he plays a prank over salt and furiously grabs Ben's wrist and threatens him before leaving. Donna and Abi Branning (Lorna Fitzgerald) witness this and they confront Ben over Luke's behaviour. Later, Luke calls Ben and apologises. Ben finds a business card in Luke's wallet reading 'Project Dagmar' and when Ben asks questions about it, Luke chokes Ben when he demands answers. Ben tells Max's daughter, Lauren Branning (Jacqueline Jossa), what happened and about Project Dagmar. Josh, who has no knowledge of Project Dagmar, also questions Luke. Luke throttles him before grabs Josh in the throat but Fi breaks them up and Josh is hurt that Fi is in on Project Dagmar whilst he is excluded. Lauren finds a Project Dagmar model, showing how Albert Square will be. Luke gives Ben an expensive car, which Ben orders Luke to remove. Luke physically attacks Ben and leaves him unconscious. James, Luke and Hugo later arrive and James tells them they own Grafton Hill. They serve the Carters with an eviction notice, putting up the money owed to the original amount of £60,000. James reveals that they plan to turn their obtained buildings into luxury flats. When Max proposes to Fi, Luke and James reveal that they have used him as they have doubted his loyalty and burn his cheque. Luke gives Max his belongings from work and Kathy is angry with Ian when Luke reveals Weyland owns the café. Luke sacks Lauren for refusing to serve an eviction notice on Ian. After Phil asks Aidan Maguire (Patrick Bergin) to get rid of Luke, Luke is bundled into the back of a van by Aidan's thugs while Phil watches on. Months later, it emerges that Aidan has murdered Luke and had him dumped in the canal and had his teeth removed and kept in a box, despite Phil only wanting him scared off.

== Oxley ==
Oxley
- EastEnders character
- Portrayed by: Colum Gallivan
- Appears in: Episode 226; 14 April 1987

Oxley, played by Colum Gallivan, is the "Walford attacker". A series of night-time assaults on women in Walford are reported in the news and people start to worry the attacker could start to target those in the Albert Square area. Eventually, Pat Wicks (Pam St. Clement) is brutally assaulted in February 1987 and left battered and unconscious in the middle of Albert Square. The police have no luck tracing the attacker, though Pat's ex-husband, Pete Beale (Peter Dean) becomes a suspect. In April, Oxley is seen in The Queen Victoria pub where Lofty Holloway (Tom Watt) mistakes him for Luxford and Copley brewery manager Reg Sparrow (Richard Ireson). Later that evening, Oxley attempts to attack Debbie Wilkins (Shirley Cheriton) in the launderette but is warded off by her self-defence moves and is restrained by Pete, who hears Debbie's screams. The police are able to apprehend Oxley and he is arrested and charged.

== Reg Sparrow ==
Reg Sparrow
- EastEnders character
- Portrayed by: Richard Ireson
- Duration: 1987–1988
- First appearance: Episode 226; 14 April 1987
- Last appearance: Episode 389; 27 October 1988
In-universe information
- Occupation: Brewery area manager

Reg Sparrow, played by Richard Ireson, is the area manager for Luxford & Copley brewery following the retirement of James Willmott-Brown (William Boyde), who has left to run The Dagmar wine bar. He oversees the running of The Queen Victoria public house, which is being managed by Den Watts (Leslie Grantham). The Vic's profits are floundering following Den's separation from his wife, Angie Watts (Anita Dobson). Reg comes to Walford to assess the problem. He wants the money that Den owes the brewery and demands to see the pub's invoices. Den tries to avoid this by steering clear of the pub all day and leaving his bar staff to put Reg off. This plan fails due to Angie, who happily informs Reg where Den keeps all the pub's bookwork, just to spite her husband. Den is forced to sell his car to pay off some of his debt.

Later in the year, Sparrow joins Den in one of Ali (Nejdet Salih) and Mehmet Osman's (Haluk Bilginer) notorious after-hours card games. Den fleeces him and manages to win a vast sum of his money, although he later gives him back half in return for a future favour. Sparrow is partial to monetary bribes and often turns a blind eye to Den's dodgy dealings. In 1988 Pat Wicks (Pam St. Clement) and Frank Butcher (Mike Reid) are forced to bribe Sparrow to get him to grant them tenancy at the Vic. After they are instated, Sparrow continues to exert his influence over Frank, by persuading him to throw an exuberant birthday party at the Vic in his honour, and then disappearing without paying the bill.

== Magda Czajkowski ==
Magda Czajkowski
- EastEnders character
- Portrayed by: Kathryn Apanowicz
- Duration: 1987–1988
- First appearance: Episode 232; 5 May 1987
- Last appearance: Episode 329; 31 March 1988
In-universe information
- Occupation: Caterer

Magda "Mags" Czajkowski is played by Kathryn Apanowicz.

Magda arrives in May 1987 and secures a catering concession at The Queen Victoria pub, which is where she meets and begins a flirtatious relationship with the married publican, Den Watts (Leslie Grantham). With Den recently separated from his alcoholic wife Angie Watts (Anita Dobson), he is free to actively pursue Magda, which only infuriates his already fragile wife. Later in the year, Den goes on a trip to Morocco and whilst he is away, Magda starts flirting with barman Simon Wicks (Nick Berry), who subsequently ends the relationship with his girlfriend Sharon Watts (Letitia Dean) to be with Magda. When Den returns from his extended holiday, he finds that Magda is no longer interested in him. When Den discovers that she is seeing Simon, he punches him, sacks him and throws him out of his home in The Vic. A few months later Amanda leaves for Australia and Magda moves to Albert Square, where she rents a flat at 3 Albert Square from Kelvin Carpenter (Paul J. Medford), and manages Symphony Food Catering on her own. With Den now out of the picture, Magda decides she wants a more serious commitment from Simon so she asks him to move into her flat with her, and he agrees.

However, their relationship does not go smoothly. Magda is a bit older than Simon, and his immature tendencies often infuriate her, whilst her complaining infuriates him. Simon has some family upsets over the coming months and Magda fails to support him adequately, so he turns to his former boss, Den, for counsel. On Den's advice, Simon proceeds to pursue other women, and then starts seeing the barmaid Donna Ludlow (Matilda Ziegler) behind Magda's back. By this time Magda is in love with Simon and his rejection hurts her. Den uses this opportunity to gain his revenge on Magda. He feigns mock sympathy for her, then seduces her, but before he gets her into bed, he tells her that he has to go on an errand. He instructs Magda to "get ready" for him, telling her that he will be back soon. He then leaves Magda undressed and waiting in his bed for hours, before instructing Simon's mother, Pat Wicks (Pam St. Clement), to inform her that he is otherwise engaged, leaving her humiliated.

Magda tries to take her mind off things by attempting to purchase a new property, the house that James Willmott-Brown (William Boyde) is selling. However, she receives another setback when James has a better offer and turns her down. After a heart-felt chat with Lou Beale (Anna Wing), Magda decides to cut her losses and leave Walford. She leaves the Square to share a flat with a friend in Fulham in March 1988.

== Edie Smith ==
Edie Smith
- EastEnders character
- Portrayed by: Eileen O'Brien
- Duration: 1987–1988
- First appearance: Episode 234; 12 May 1987
- Last appearance: Episode 346; 31 May 1988
In-universe information
- Husband: Chris Smith
- Sons: Brendan Smith; Gary Smith
- Daughters: Mary Smith; Bridey Smith
- Granddaughters: Annie Smith

Edie Smith, played by Eileen O'Brien, is the mother of Mary Smith (Linda Davidson). She appears between 12 May 1987 and 31 May 1988.

A religious and strict woman, Edie alienated her daughter so much that she ran away from Stockport to escape her. Mary moves to London after becoming pregnant and chooses not to inform her family about her child. When Mary's father, Chris Smith (Allan O'Keefe), tracks her down and discovers he has a granddaughter, Mary makes him promise not to tell Edie. Mary worries that her mother will interfere and take over. Chris pays heed to his daughter's wishes for several years. However, when he discovers that Mary has left her daughter Annie Smith alone in her flat to prostitute herself, he decides to take action. He informs Edie and she comes to Walford in May 1987 to sort Mary out. Despite Mary's protests, she takes Annie back to Stockport to live with her, leaving Mary distraught.

With the help of Rod Norman (Christopher McHallem), Mary manages to take control of her life. She contacts her mother to bring Annie back, but Edie keeps refusing. Eventually Mary becomes so depressed that Rod contacts Chris and tells him Mary is considering suicide. A concerned Chris then finally brings Annie home to Mary.

Chris decides to move to London early in 1988 to open a haulage company. Things do not go according to plan and he spends much of his time drinking himself into a stupor. Eventually, Mary contacts her mother to come and help Chris and the Smith family finally manage to sort out their differences. Shortly after, Edie begins to consider moving to London permanently. This is too much for Mary to bear, however, and she begins to rebel against her parents once again. Edie tries to intervene, but Mary is hostile and tells her that she will kill her if she ever tries to take Annie from her again. Shortly after, Mary decides to leave Walford. She takes Annie and jumps on a bus to an unknown destination. Edie refuses to waste any more concern on her unruly daughter and she leaves Walford to return to Stockport.

== Graham Clark ==
Graham Clark
- EastEnders character
- Portrayed by: Gary Webster
- Duration: 1987–1988
- First appearance: Episode 244; 16 June 1987
- Last appearance: Episode 308; 19 January 1988
In-universe information
- Father: Mr Clark
- Brothers: Barry Clark
- Wife: Kate Clark

Graham Clark, played by Gary Webster, grew up in Walford and went to school with Nick Cotton (John Altman), Rod Norman (Christopher McHallem) and Darren Roberts (Aaron Carrington). After getting involved in criminal activity with Nick, Graham served time in prison, but it later transpires that Nick had committed the crime that he was imprisoned for. Graham never forgives Nick for allowing him to go to prison for his crime.

Graham is very protective of his younger brother Barry Clark (Gary Hailes). Barry is afraid to admit to Graham that he is homosexual and in a relationship with Colin Russell (Michael Cashman). He tries to cover this up, but is relieved when Graham reveals he had known he is gay and accepted it. Graham marries a girl named Kate in 1987 after she becomes pregnant with his child. Graham is looking forward to the prospect of becoming a father and asks Barry to be Godfather. Kate miscarries weeks before the baby is due in November 1987. Graham and Barry are devastated.

Graham gets involved in the plight of Colin, who is targeted by the criminal organisation known as "The Firm". The Firm want Colin, who is doing jury service, to give a verdict of "not guilty" for one of their associates, and they use Den Watts (Leslie Grantham) to lean on him. Graham intervenes, he along with a gang of thugs and his pet Alsatian, Prince, confront Den and order him to stay away from Colin and Barry. Nick's father, Charlie Cotton (Christopher Hancock), uses Graham's animosity towards Nick to get rid of his son. Nick had been hiding from Graham, but Charlie allows Graham into their house to confront him. Graham orders Nick to leave Walford or face the consequences. Nick flees for his own safety. Graham is last seen in January 1988, supporting Colin over his recent break-up with Barry.

== Johnny Harris ==
Johnny Harris, played by Michael O'Hagan, is a criminal associate of Den Watts (Leslie Grantham), who shows up occasionally from June 1987 to liaise with Den about various scams they are involved with. After one of his scams is uncovered by the police, Johnny is sent to Dickens Hill prison on remand, and Den joins him there in September 1988. Johnny is the "number 1" of the prison wing (head prisoner), and before Johnny leaves Dickens Hill to attend his trial, he arranges for Den to take over his position of "number 1".

== Farrukh ==
Farrukh
- EastEnders character
- Portrayed by: Sumar Khan
- First appearance: Episode 251; 9 July 1987
- Last appearance: Episode 289; 19 November 1987
In-universe information
- Occupation: Lawyer; Politician
- Wife: Naima Jeffery
- First cousins: Saeed Jeffery

Farrukh, played by Sumar Khan, comes to Walford from Bangladesh as a suitor who wants to woo his cousin Naima Jeffery (Shreela Ghosh). Naima had disgraced her family by divorcing her first husband following the demise of their arranged marriage. She is not open to embarking on another arranged marriage, but when she meets Farrukh, she is pleasantly surprised. A successful lawyer in Bangladesh with political aspirations, Farrukh is in full support of Naima's desire to be an independent woman. He and Naima bond, and several months later he returns to propose to Naima. They marry off-screen in Birmingham and move to Bangladesh in November 1987.

== Ashraf Karim ==
Ashraf Karim, played by Aftab Sachak, moves to Walford in 1987 to run the First Til Last grocery store. The next year, his wife Sufia (Rani Singh), and their children Shireen (Nisha Kapur) and Sohail (Ronnie Jhutti) join him. The Karims keep themselves to themselves, and don't mix much with the local of Walford. However, secretly Ashraf continues to have an affair with his long term mistress, Stella. Sufia finds out and threatens to leave, but Ashraf promises her that the affair is over. However the romance soon restarts, and the family of Jabbar Ahmed (Ashraf's arranged future son-in-law) see Ashraf with Stella, and call off the wedding. With his family in disgrace, Ashraf decides to move his family to Bristol. The Karims' last appearance is in June 1990.

== Rod Norman ==
Rod Norman played by Christopher McHallem, is a modern-day hobo. He dosses in squats and never settles anywhere for long, although he does return to Albert Square several times. Rod is a sucker for female hopeless cases and he tries to help out several 'women in need' over the years, although he is rarely thanked for his efforts. Rod is first seen in Albert Square in July 1987 as an acquaintance of fellow punk, Mary Smith (Linda Davidson). Rod is a greasy layabout, but underneath his scruffy appearance there is a kind-hearted, genuine guy, who will go out of his way to help anyone in need.

== Darren Roberts ==
Darren Roberts
- EastEnders character
- Portrayed by: Gary McDonald
- Duration: 1987–1988
- First appearance: Episode 256; 28 July 1987
- Last appearance: Episode 361; 21 July 1988
In-universe information
- Mother: Mrs Roberts
- Sisters: Carmel Jackson; Maxine Roberts
- Wife: Darlene Roberts (separated)
- Sons: Junior Roberts
- Daughters: Aisha Roberts
- Uncles: Josh
- Aunts: Nancy

Darren Roberts, played by Gary McDonald, is the brother of Carmel Roberts (Judith Jacob). He arrives in Walford in July 1987 along with his son Junior (Aaron Carrington) and young daughter, Aisha (Aisha Jacob), who have different mothers. Darren has fallen out with his wife Darleen, and manages to persuade his sister to allow him and his children to move in with her at number 3b Albert Square.

Darren had attended school with Nick Cotton (John Altman), Graham Clark (Gary Webster) and Rod Norman (Christopher McHallem), none known for their law-abiding tendencies, and just like his wayward contemporaries, Darren also regularly dabbles on the wrong side of the law. Darren sets up various dodgy deals. He makes an enemy out of Den Watts (Leslie Grantham) for selling stolen goods on his patch; he gets involved in pornographic video laundering; instigates a counterfeit money ring; starts renting out an abandoned flat to squatters for a weekly fee; and holds a 'cultural evening' in the community centre, which is a front for a porn film screening and stripper – Dot Cotton (June Brown) accidentally wanders in and faints.

He gets on the wrong side of Brad Williams (Jonathan Stratt), a member of the gangster organisation known as The Firm. Darren wants membership into the gang, but after several attempts to gain favour, Brad warns him off by beating him.

Darren goes on to con Ian Beale (Adam Woodyatt) and Barry Clark (Gary Hailes). Darren provides them with equipment for a mobile disco, but the equipment turns out to be hired and further hire purchase payments are still owed. Soon after, the hire purchase men turn up and take back all the disco gear. When Carmel finds out, she throws Darren out of her flat, after which, he disappears in July 1988, abandoning his two children in the process.

Days before his departure, Darren is questioned about the torching of The Dagmar, following Kathy Beale's (Gillian Taylforth) rape, and he purposefully implicates Den Watts as the culprit. Den, who is working for The Firm, is eventually forced to take the blame and is arrested for the deed. Joanne Francis (Pamela Salem) and Gregory Mantel (Pavel Douglas), two members of The Firm, who are watching Darren. They later reveal that Darren had moved in with a girl, whose boyfriend then puts him in hospital. He never returns to Albert Square to claim his children, and according to Joanne Francis (Pamela Salem), he relocated to Brixton. However, in 1989, Darren's accomplice Vince Johnson (Hepburn Graham) arrives in Walford. Vince regularly liaises with Darren by phone, and both are responsible for conning Frank Butcher (Mike Reid) in a motor scam.

== Junior Roberts ==
Junior Roberts
- EastEnders character
- Portrayed by: Aaron Carrington
- Duration: 1987–1989
- First appearance: Episode 256; 28 July 1987
- Last appearance: Episode 494; 31 October 1989
In-universe information
- Occupation: Student
- Father: Darren Roberts
- Mother: Bev
- Stepmother: Darlene Roberts
- Half-sisters: Aisha Roberts
- Aunts: Maxine Roberts; Carmel Jackson

Junior Roberts, played by Aaron Carrington, is a young tearaway, who idolises his wayward father. He is often getting into trouble and mischief around Albert Square.

Junior is the son of Darren Roberts (Gary McDonald), and he arrives in Walford along with his young sister Aisha (Aisha Jacob) in July 1987. The Roberts clan come to live with Junior's aunt, Carmel (Judith Jacob), at number 3b Albert Square.

Junior proceeds to cause havoc around the Square, getting into trouble for stealing, graffitiing the square, playing truant, and gives everyone a fright when he runs away from home and almost gets into a car with a stranger. Junior finds himself a girlfriend in 1988, Melody (Lyanne Compton), who is equally as troublesome. The two begin a scam where they steal dogs from people and then return them for a reward. They also manage to spark up a feud with the Karim children, with both sides swapping racist insults at each other. Darren, a petty criminal, is not the best role-model for his impressionable son, and he is often unable to curtail his deviance.

Junior idolises Darren and so he is devastated in July 1988 when his father abandons him and his sister and disappears without a word to anyone. Junior is forced to move away from Walford and go and live with his Grandparents, but he shows up regularly to visit Carmel and gets into more trouble, such as stealing Colin Russell's (Michael Cashman) CD collection and then selling them on to Rod Norman (Christopher McHallem) for a profit. This act even leads to him getting arrested after Colin's boyfriend, Guido (Nicholas Donovan), decides to teach him a lesson and informs the police. He gets off with a warning, but continues to make trouble for himself when he persuades Ricky Butcher (Sid Owen) to buy him alcohol, and is witnessed drinking by Dot Cotton (June Brown). Dot is appalled to see an underage boy getting drunk, and she promptly informs Carmel. By 1989 Junior has become so troublesome that his elderly, sickly grandparents can no longer cope and Carmel is instructed to take both her brother's children in again. This is met unfavourably by Carmel's new husband Matthew Jackson (Steven Hartley), who freely admits that he dislikes Junior immensely.

Matthew and Junior argue regularly and this puts a severe strain on Carmel's marital relationship. Junior's dislike for Matthew stems from the fact that he rightly suspects him of abusing his aunt. Junior tries to put a stop to Matthew's violence by informing various members of his family about the abuse he'd witnessed, but despite their best efforts Carmel refuses to take their help and denies that anything untoward is occurring. Things reach a head in July 1989, when Junior, in an attempt to protect his aunt from Matthew's rage, stabs him with a kitchen knife. Matthew is rushed to hospital, and Junior finds it difficult to come to terms with what he has done. Carmel eventually manages to reassure him that what he did was in self-defence and he is not to blame.

The following month Carmel's father dies, and so the Robertses all leave Walford to tend to Junior's grieving grandmother. Junior is not pleased with this and makes an ill-fated attempt to run away from home with Melody, but he only manages to get as far as the front door before Carmel discovers his plan and forces him to leave with her instead.

Over the following months Junior shows up in Walford regularly to visit Melody and Vince Johnson (Hepburn Graham), a friend of his father. His last appearance is October 1989 when he attends a Halloween party in the Square.

== Aisha Roberts ==
Aisha Roberts
- EastEnders character
- Portrayed by: Aisha Jacob
- Duration: 1987–1989
- First appearance: Episode 262; 18 August 1987
- Last appearance: Episode 473; 17 August 1989
In-universe information
- Father: Darren Roberts
- Mother: Darlene Roberts
- Half-brothers: Junior Roberts
- Aunts: Carmel Jackson; Maxine Roberts

Aisha Roberts is played by Aisha Jacob, who is the real life daughter of Judith Jacob, the actress who played her on-screen aunt, Carmel Jackson.

Aisha is the young daughter of Darren Roberts (Gary McDonald) and the half-sister of Junior Roberts (Aaron Carrington). She comes to Walford in August 1987 to live with her aunt Carmel, following the breakdown of her parents marriage. Darren is an irresponsible parent and the care of the young toddler is left mainly to Carmel and Junior – who is forced to take and collect Aisha from nursery school, making him miss school himself.

In July 1988, Darren abandons both his children and leaves Walford without a word to anyone. Aisha is then sent away from Walford to live with her grandparents. However, the following year, she is sent back to Carmel, much to the annoyance of her abusive husband, Matthew Jackson (Steven Hartley). Matthew finds caring for Aisha a chore and gets annoyed with her for crying, wandering into his bedroom constantly and making his flat a mess. Eventually Carmel and Matthew's marriage comes to an end after Junior stabs Matthew in self-defence. In August 1989 Aisha's grandfather dies, and so the entire Roberts family move away from Walford to tend to Aisha's grieving grandmother.

== Donna Ludlow ==
Donna Ludlow, played by Matilda Ziegler between 1987 and 1989, is the daughter of Kathy Beale (Gillian Taylforth). Donna was put up for adoption at a young age, and in August 1987 she arrives in Walford to make contact with her long-lost mother. Donna is a troubled individual who is desperate for attention, but she is shunned by almost all who encounter her. After she finds out she was conceived from rape and then rejected by Kathy, Donna sets herself on a path of self-destruction. In April 1989, she takes a drug overdose and chokes to death on her own vomit.

== Frank Butcher ==
Frank Butcher, played by Mike Reid, makes his first appearance on-screen as a guest character in 1987 but, due to a positive viewer reception, he is reintroduced in 1988 as a regular character. Reid took a long hiatus from EastEnders in 1994. Frank returns as a recurring character from December 1995 to January 1998, and eventually becomes a regular once again from May 1998 to November 2000, when Reid quit. Frank makes three brief reappearances after that, the final one in December 2005. Given the widespread identification of Mike Reid as Frank, Reid's death in July 2007 led to BBC bosses deciding that it would not be possible for the character to return in the future. In November 2007, it was announced that the character would die off-screen and in April 2008 his funeral was screened as part of a special set of episodes, dubbed Frank week.

== Derek Taylor ==
Derek Taylor
- EastEnders character
- Portrayed by: Ken Sharrock
- First appearance: Episode 268; 8 September 1987
- Last appearance: Episode 271; 17 September 1987
In-universe information
- Sons: David Taylor
- Daughters: Kim Taylor

Derek Taylor, played by Ken Sharrock, is a friendly passer-by who stops to help when the Walford ladies' darts team's coach breaks down on the way to the Isle of Dogs. He forms a friendship with Pauline Fowler (Wendy Richard), and follows the team to the Isle of Dogs. He is attracted to Pauline, and makes a surprise visit to Walford on 15 September 1987 to see her in the launderette. He meets Pauline's husband Arthur (Bill Treacher), and her sister-in-law Kathy Beale (Gillian Taylforth), and offers her a deal to sell her knitwear. Derek goes back to the Fowlers' house with Pauline. Arthur returns home from his allotment and rudely asks Derek to leave. Pauline turns him down when he visits again on 17 September, and he leaves Walford.

== Martin Hunter ==
Martin Hunter
- EastEnders character
- Portrayed by: Peter Purves
- First appearance: Episode 278; 13 October 1987
- Last appearance: Episode 280; 20 October 1987
In-universe information
- Occupation: TV presenter

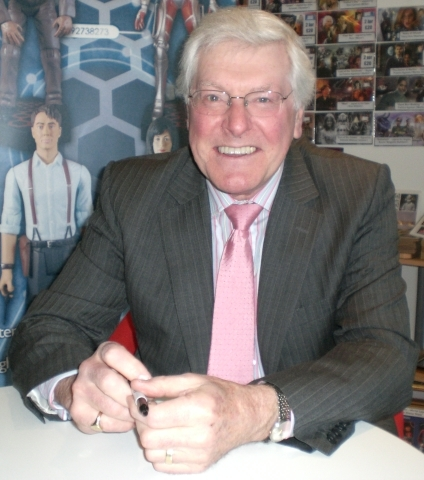
Television presenter Peter Purves portrayed Martin Hunter.

Martin Hunter, played by Peter Purves, appears in episodes 278, 279 and 280, first broadcast in October 1987.

Martin is a television presenter who arrives in Walford to make a documentary about East End life. He promises to feature Den Watts (Leslie Grantham) in the documentary, but James Willmott-Brown (William Boyde) diverts his attention, and introduces Hunter to his chief barmaid Angie Watts (Anita Dobson), and tries to get the documentary focused on his wine bar, The Dagmar. Willmott-Brown introduces Hunter to Colin Russell (Michael Cashman), as one of the new breed of people in Albert Square, and Pauline Fowler (Wendy Richard), as one of the older type of people in the square.

When the documentary is aired, the residents of Walford are horrified at how Hunter has misrepresented them.

== Duncan Boyd ==
Duncan Boyd
- EastEnders character
- Portrayed by: David Gillespie
- Duration: 1987–1989, 2023
- First appearance: Episode 280; 20 October 1987
- Last appearance: Episode 6659; 1 May 2023
In-universe information
- Occupation: Curate
- Mother: Joan Boyd

Duncan Boyd, played by David Gillespie, is the curate at the local church. He is first seen in October 1987, when Sharon Watts (Letitia Dean), who is sick of being made to choose sides between her rowing parents, seeks solace at the church. Over subsequent chats, Sharon soon begins to feel comfortable enough around Duncan to start relaying her problems and she is overjoyed to finally find someone that listens to her for a change. Over the following months, Sharon finds herself leaning on Duncan more and more and she soon begins to feel attracted towards him, feelings that are reciprocated by Duncan.

By the end of the year, the two start a relationship, much to the shock of Sharon's parents, Den (Leslie Grantham) and Angie (Anita Dobson). Sharon seems to have fallen in love and in December she asks Duncan if they can get engaged. Duncan tries to win Den over by informing him of his admirable intentions towards Sharon, and hinting that marriage is a definite possibility in the not too distant future. Den is pessimistic however, and sets about trying to upset the relationship by persuading his employee, Donna Ludlow (Matilda Ziegler), to flirt with Duncan outrageously, knowing full well that Sharon will catch them in the act. The plan works, and Sharon is furious to see Duncan sharing a drink with Donna, but unfortunately for Den, their row is short-lived and they patch things up soon enough.

Later in the year, Duncan sparks up a friendship with Lofty Holloway (Tom Watt), who regularly accompanies him to youth help groups. This eventually leads to Lofty's departure when Duncan sets him up with a job as a handyman in a children's home away from the Square. Cracks starts to show in Duncan and Sharon's relationship, mainly because Sharon starts to begrudge the amount of time Duncan spends on his Christian duties and the many Bible readings he attends with devout Christian Dot Cotton (June Brown). She also begins to grow tired of Duncan's inability to have fun and she starts to ponder whether they are really suited to each other. Things reach a climax after Duncan persuades Sharon and her best friend Michelle (Susan Tully) to house a homeless Donna in their flat. Malicious Donna subsequently tries to come between the friends, and when asked to leave, she refuses and claims tenants rights. Sharon blames Duncan for the whole mess, and when he is offered a parish in Wiltshire and wants to proceed with their wedding immediately, Sharon has second thoughts and calls off their engagement. Duncan is heartbroken and proceeds to ask her to marry him several more times, before he finally accepts it is over.

Duncan remains in Walford until July 1989, performing priestly duties, including being the priest at Den's memorial service in April, after which he is not seen again until 25 April 2023, when he returns for a guest stint.

== Gerry Fairweather ==
Gerry Fairweather
- EastEnders character
- Portrayed by: Jason Watkins
- Duration: 1987–1988
- First appearance: Episode 288; 17 November 1987
- Last appearance: Episode 304; 5 January 1988
In-universe information
- Occupation: Estate agent
- Brothers: Derek Fairweather

Gerry Fairweather, played by Jason Watkins, is a yuppie estate agent who frequents the Dagmar Winebar. Magda Czajkowski (Kathryn Apanowicz) asks him to help her find a property in Walford, but the manager of the Dagmar, Angie Watts (Anita Dobson), blames him and his type for the gentrification of the East End. Gerry often infuriates Angie with sexist and rude remarks, and when he, his brother, and his friends are having their Christmas party in the Dagmar, she snaps and punches Gerry in the face, knocking him to the floor. Gerry threatens to sue the Dagmar, until Angie's daughter Sharon (Letitia Dean) makes him see how humiliated he would feel to stand up in court and confess to being beaten by a woman. Gerry never returns to the Dagmar again.

== Alan McIntyre ==
Alan McIntyre
- EastEnders character
- Portrayed by: Pip Miller
- Duration: 1987–1989
- First appearance: Episode 293; 3 December 1987
- Last appearance: Episode 488; 10 October 1989
In-universe information
- Occupation: Landlord

Alan McIntyre, played by Pip Miller, first appears in December 1987 as the downstairs neighbour to Sue (Sandy Ratcliff) and Ali Osman (Nejdet Salih). Alan plays his music extremely loudly at all hours, and holds unruly parties. The Osmans are left exhausted and irritable from severe lack of sleep. After much pressuring from Sue, Ali is forced to reason with Alan, but Alan refuses to take their complaints on board. When the noise continues, the Osmans go down to Alan's flat and threaten to complain to the landlord to make him stop, only to find out that Alan is their landlord and that he'd bought their flat.

Things then proceed to get infinitely worse for the Osmans at the hands of Alan, when their flat is broken into and their carpet is defecated on. Ali and Alan have several fights and Alan often resorts to racial insults. During one such argument, Roly, Den Watts' (Leslie Grantham) poodle slips his leash and bites Alan in the arm.

In 1988, Alan manages to patch up his differences with Ali and he also purchases James Willmott-Brown's (William Boyde) house and converts it into flats. He allows Donna Ludlow (Matilda Ziegler) to have first choice of one of the flats in exchange for sex.

In October 1989 Ali is going through some money problems, so as always, he turns to gambling to get himself out of debt. However, he picks the wrong opponent in Alan, and after he has a bad loss and is unable to pay his rent, Alan kicks him out of his flat, forcing Ali to return to Cyprus. This is Alan's last appearance.

== Others ==
| Character | Date(s) | Actor | Circumstances |
|---|---|---|---|
| Mr Fenwick | 13 January | Chris Sanders | Angie Watts's solicitor. She visits him for advice over her divorce from Den Watts. Angie explains to Mr Fenwick that she realises that her marriage is definitely over but that she wants to counter his petition because he had a mistress for seven years. Mr Fenwick recommends that they serve a petition on Den but it would mean going to court. However, Angie remains confused about what to do. |
| Dr Blackburn | 13 January | David McAlister | A psychiatrist who assesses Arthur Fowler following his mental breakdown on Christmas Day the previous year. Dr Blackburn later explains privately to Arthur's daughter, Michelle Holloway, that Arthur's breakdown was due to his unemployment, lack of money and the theft of the Christmas Club money. He says Arthur can be helped but that it will a long process and he should admitted into hospital, adding that Arthur's family should help by making him feel valued, as he has lost all his self-esteem. |
| Ms Curbishley | 13 January | Veronica Roberts | A woman from the Youth Training Scheme who interviews Sharon Watts after Sharon left her first YTS placement. Ms Curbishley is not happy that Sharon left, even though the people at the first placement were pleased with Sharon. Sharon explains that she wants a placement that offers her the chance of a career and is prepared to work harder at it. Sharon also says she wants Ms Curbishley to apply for as many placements as she can. Ms Curbishley agrees to support Sharon but says she may need to take evening classes, which Sharon is willing to do. |
| Alexander | 29 January | Colin Gourley | A man who meets Mary Smith in The Queen Victoria. They go to her flat and he pays her but he only talks about his life. It becomes apparent that Alexander has no friends or family apart from a sister who lives in Tring who he rarely sees due to friction with her husband, Eric. Mary is nervous when Alexander talks about cutting up Eric's clothing that he disliked and she asks him to leave. Alexander asks if he can stay the night but Mary turns him down. However, when he reveals he has nowhere to stay and no money, Mary returns his money to him. |
| Cyril | 10 February | Uncredited | A customer in The Queen Victoria pub who Pat Wicks serves. |
| DS Todd | 24 February–26 March (3 episodes) | Duncan Preston | A police officer who arrives on Albert Square to investigate the brutal attack on Pat Wicks by the "Walford Attacker". He questions a number of the residents including Kathy Beale, Pauline Fowler, Colin Russell, Tony Carpenter, Dot Cotton, Ali Osman, Den Watts, Dr Legg, Simon Wicks and Pete Beale. He speaks to Dr Legg about an incident where Dr Legg almost hit Annie Smith with his car and asks him for details about some of his patients, which Dr Legg cannot give him. He takes Simon and Pete to the police station for further questioning as Simon has an unexplained scratch on his face and Pete has no alibi. DS Todd returns following a further attack on another woman and discovers that there was a party that night and Pete was the only person to leave early having been humiliated by a prank, so he asks Pete to answer more questions at the police station. DS Todd later witnesses Pete's son, Ian Beale, almost giving a woman the wrong change on Pete's market stall and accuses him of doing it deliberately. |
| Sally | 26 March | Cindy Day | A woman who arrives at The Queen Victoria pub and tells the landlord, Den Watts, that she is looking for a job. Den interviews her and afterwards, Den's partner, Jan Hammond accuses Den of trying to charm Sally but he denies this. Later, Den phones Sally to talk about the job over dinner. |
| Jude | 2 April | Joanne Bell | A girl who arrives at the Fowlers' home after Mark Fowler returns for a day visit. Jude collects Mark with a friend in a large purple car, despite his mother Pauline Fowler's attempts to keep him overnight. |
| Gillian | 2 April | Harriet Cole | A woman from Bromley who Den Watts brings home from a date. He propositions her into trying to stay the night but she leaves when Den's partner, Jan Hammond, confronts him over his actions, having been informed of Gillian's presence by his soon to be ex-wife Angie Watts. |
| Dr Bell | 7 April | Merelina Kendall | Sue Osman's GP, who examines Sue's breast after Sue finds a lump in it. Dr Bell says it could be a cyst but books Sue into a breast clinic for further tests. |
| Michael | 7 April | Graeme Edler | A man who is drinking alone in The Queen Victoria pub when Mary Smith asks to sit with him while she waits for a friend. He offers her a drink. Later, Debbie Wilkins arrives with Mary's daughter, Annie Smith, who Mary has left alone in the launderette, and Michael leaves the pub. |
| June Watkins | 9–16 April | Madaline Blakeney | The godmother of Kathy Beale's (Gillian Taylforth) daughter Donna Ludlow (Matilda Ziegler), whom Kathy had given up for adoption as she was conceived from rape. June approaches Kathy while she is working on the market and asks to speak in private, so Kathy invites her to her home later. June tells Kathy who she is and that Donna wants to make contact with her, but tells her that it is Kathy's decision. Kathy decides not to see Donna. |
| Wayne | 14 April | Uncredited | A man who helps Angie Watts move her things out of The Queen Victoria pub. |
| W/O Atkinson | 23 April–19 May (2 episodes) | Hugh Martin | A Warrant Officer from the Court who visits Mary Smith, giving her a demand for immediate payment of her overdue fines that she has been ordered to pay by the Court following her conviction for soliciting. The demand is £30 which Mary does not have. Mary is threatened with arrest if she cannot pay the demand in full. Ethel Skinner and Dot Cotton are present and are prepared to give Mary £5 each to help her out. Mr Atkinson returns in May to arrest Mary and escort her to court as she has not paid her fine or made an appearance in court. Mr Atkinson tells Mary she will most likely receive a Suspended Committal Warrant meaning Mary will have another seven days to pay her fine or she will go to prison if she does not pay after the seven days are up. |
| Miss Taylor | 23 April | Julia Goodman | A woman from the VAT Office who arrives to calculate Den Watts's VAT bill. She meets only Simon Wicks, as Den is out trying to sell his car so the cheque he has prepared for the VAT bill and given to Simon to give to Miss Taylor does not bounce. Simon spends most of the time trying to charm Miss Taylor in an effort to stall her so he will not have to present the cheque. However, Simon has to eventually hand over the cheque as Miss Taylor tells him that the VAT bill is already overdue and that Den knows that if the bill is not paid on her visit then court proceedings will commence and Den will face additional fines. The VAT bill ends up being over £500 more than originally estimated. |
| Ray | 5 May–25 June (10 episodes) | Bob Hewis | Four workmen contracted by James Willmott-Brown to renovate The Dagmar pub on Turpin Road, for which he has recently acquired the tenancy. They lodge at the Abercorn Bed & Breakfast to be close to the job site. They frequently flirt with Angie Watts much to her delight and frequently banter with her. They prove to be lazy and are often seen in The Queen Victoria pub or the café, much to James's frustration. They delay the Dagmar job further by helping set up for the engagement party at the Vic for Debbie Wilkins and Terry Rich. However, with the help of Arthur Fowler, the men are able to complete renovations within a month and the Dagmar wine bar opens. Only Ray and Tel are credited and given dialogue. Tel's surname is revealed through dialogue. |
| Tel Conway | 5 May–25 June (12 episodes) | Michael Garner | |
| Gaz | 5 May–25 June (10 episodes) | Uncredited | |
| Omo | 5 May–25 June (11 episodes) | Uncredited | |
| Alan Miller | 7 May | Nick Reding | Arthur Fowler's defence lawyer when he stands trial for the theft of the money from his Christmas Club the previous December. Miller recommends that Arthur pleads guilty and tells him that he could get up to 12 months' imprisonment. At the trial, he questions DS West, the arresting officer, who agrees that Arthur was helpful when he was arrested. Miller states the facts of Arthur's mitigation, including his redundancy after 15 years, the strain this had on his family, his mother-in-law's illnesses, his depression and his daughter's intention to marry. He interviews Dr Legg as a witness and mentions that Arthur has secured a job working for James Willmott-Brown. Due to the mitigating circumstances, Arthur is sentenced to 28 days' imprisonment. |
| Jem | 7 May | Norman Gregory | A solicitor who is an associate of Alan Miller. He is credited as "solicitor". |
| Mr Vaughan | 7 May | Colin Jeavons | The prosecutor at Arthur Fowler's theft trial. |
| WPC Barbara Stewart | 14 May | Dione Inman | A colleague of DS Terry Rich who attends Terry and Debbie Wilkins' engagement party. |
| Tracey | 28 May | Donna Galbraith | A little girl who attends Vicki Fowler's first birthday party. Pauline Fowler asks Tracey if she is having a nice time, which Tracey confirms. Vicki's stepfather, Lofty Holloway, lets Tracey light the candle on Vicki's birthday cake. |
| John | 4 June | Uncredited | A customer on Pete Beale's fruit and veg market stall. |
| Mr Khan | 6 August | Dhirendra | Ashraf Karim's lawyer who offers Ali Osman and Sue Osman £5000 to vacate the flat they are renting from Ashraf. Sue is tempted by the offer but Ali refuses. |
| Terry | 18 August | Vincenzo Nicoli | |
| Dean | 18 August | Daniel Pryke | |
| Father Allen | 27 August | Ian Jentle | A Catholic priest and a friend of the Smith family, who arrives in Walford from Stockport in search of Mary Smith. At first, Mary refuses to see Father Allen as she suspects her parents Chris and Edie have sent him down to London to convince her that her daughter Annie is better off with them. However, Allen offers his support and is persuaded that Mary has changed and is able to properly care for Annie. |
| Keith Hopkins | 8-10 September (2 episodes) | Ian Redford | Tina Hopkins' (Eleanor Rhodes) parents who arrive in Walford unannounced and they are shocked with the state of her flat she shares with her boyfriend, Ian Beale (Adam Woodyatt). They take Tina with them back to Ilford. |
| Mrs Hopkins | 8-10 September (2 episodes) | Pamela Merrick | Tina Hopkins' (Eleanor Rhodes) parents who arrive in Walford unannounced and they are shocked with the state of her flat she shares with her boyfriend, Ian Beale (Adam Woodyatt). They take Tina with them back to Ilford. |
| Mrs Burton | 10 September | Jill Benedict | A member of the Isle of Dogs ladies' darts team, (and presumably that team's captain), that the Walford ladies' darts team play against at the Isle of Dogs. Mrs Burton asks Pauline Fowler, the Walford captain, if everyone is ready to start, but Pauline asks for another five minutes as the Walford Team are awaiting the arrival of Pat Wicks. |
| Bruce Tally | 3 November 1987 – 29 March 1988 | Crawford Logan | Bruce is a local moneylender. |
| DS Mackey | 10 December | Kevin Costello | Mackey questions Arthur and Pauline Fowler, and later Colin Russell about the break-in at Colin's flat. He also arrests Charlie Cotton when shopkeeper Rezaul Kabir reports Charlie for theft. |
| DI Regis | 15 December 1987 – 11 March 1993 (4 episodes) | John Flannagan | Regis investigates the burglary of Colin Russell and Barry Clark's flat. He also investigates the murder of Eddie Royle and later questions Jack Woodman when Vicki Fowler is abducted. |
| Mr Clark | 22 December | Leon Greene | Graham and Barry Clark's father. |
| Joan Boyd | 24 December 1987 – 5 April 1988 | Maggie Ford | Duncan Boyd's mother. She helps set up the Nativity ahead of Duncan's Christmas Eve service and meets Sharon Watts. |
| Brendan Smith | 25 December | Ian Wilkinson | Mary Smith's (Linda Davidson) brother. He comes to Walford from Stockport with his mother, Edie (Eileen O'Brien) to visit his father, Chris (Allan O'Keefe) and niece, Annie, in hospital after Chris got drunk and attempted to take Annie to Stockport, but he crashed the car into a Postbox. |
| Lennie | 31 December 1987 (2 episodes) | Ivor Raymonde | A pianist who plays some cockney favorites on the piano at the Queen Victoria Pub on New Year's Eve. |
