= And the Beat Goes On (TV series) =

British television drama series

- Genre: Drama
- Created by: Phil Redmond; Mal Young
- Written by: Joe Ainsworth
- Directed by: Jeremy Summers; Stephen Garwood; Chris Bernard; Ken Horn
- Starring: Danny McCall; Lisa Faulkner; Jenny Agutter; Roy Brandon; Katy Carmichael; John McArdle; Stephen Moore; Eileen O’Brien; Lynda Thornhill; Garry Crystal; Philip McGough; Martin O’Brien; Richard Davies
- Composer: Steve Wright
- Country of origin: United Kingdom
- Original language: English
- No. of series: 1
- No. of episodes: 8

Production
- Executive producer: Phil Redmond
- Producer: Mal Young
- Production locations: Liverpool, Merseyside, England, UK
- Running time: 55 minutes
- Production company: Mersey Television

Original release
- Network: Channel 4
- Release: 19 March – 7 May 1996

And the Beat Goes On is a British television drama miniseries created by Phil Redmond and Mal Young, written for eight episodes by Joe Ainsworth. The show starred Danny McCall, Lisa Faulkner and Jenny Agutter It was produced by Mersey Television for one series and that aired on Channel 4 between 19 March and 7 May 1996.

== Plot ==
The series was primarily known for its dual-family structure, focusing on the O'Rourke and Spencer families. It explored the decade's changing social values, featuring notable storylines on teenage pregnancy, intergenerational clashes, and the introduction of tranquilizers to suburban housewives.

== Cast ==
- Danny McCall as Ritchie O'Rourke
- Lisa Faulkner as Christine Spencer
- Jenny Agutter as Connie Fairbrother Spencer
- Roy Brandon as Mickey O'Rourke
- Katy Carmichael as Cathy Williams
- Dominic Jephcott as Kenneth Fairbrother
- John McArdle as Charlie Woods
- Stephen Moore as Nicholas Spencer
- Eileen O'Brien as Mary-Ann O'Rourke
- Lynda Thornhill as Gloria O'Rourke
- Garry Crystal as Robert Spencer
- Philip McGough as Howard Clegg
- Martin O'Brien as Danny McVey
- Richard Davies as Father Hopkins

== Episodes ==
No.	Title	Directed by	Written by	Original release date
1	"Episode 1"	Jeremy Summers	Joe Ainsworth	19 March 1996
The O'Rourkes' terraced house is facing the bulldozer and dad, Mickey, doesn't want to change his life. But there are other problems as Cathy, girlfriend of Ritchie O'Rourke, is pregnant by someone else. The Spencer family have their own problems too was their wayward daughter brings home an unsuitable boyfriend, mother Connie is developing a tranquilliser dependency and her secretly gay brother is trying to persuade her husband, Nick, to lend him the money to buy a new jazz club.
2	"Episode 2"	Stephen Garwood	Joe Ainsworth	26 March 1996
Plans are well under way for Cathy and Ritchie's wedding, until Uncle Charlie discovers the truth about the baby.
3	"Episode 3"	Chris Bernard	Joe Ainsworth	2 April 1996
Ritchie tries his best to cope with a disastrous honeymoon in Blackpool. Christine causes a scandal but it is nothing compared with the one created by her mother, Connie. Ken, meanwhile, is paying protection money to Sergeant Heald.
4	"Episode 4"	Stephen Garwood	Joe Ainsworth	9 April 1996
Nicholas Spencer sets out to protect his career by covering up the hit-and- run accident. Mickey O'Rourke is determined not to join the family's move to Kirkby.
5	"Episode 5"	Jeremy Summers	Joe Ainsworth	16 April 1996
Connie secretly undergoes electro-shock treatment for her addiction but faces up to a secret from her past. Ken starts to receive anonymous blackmail notes and Ritchie O'Rourke finds that his attraction to Christine is reciprocated.
6	"Episode 6"	Chris Bernard	Joe Ainsworth	23 April 1996
The O'Rourkes celebrate moving house, while Ritchie and Christine embark on a forbidden affair.
7	"Episode 7"	Chris Bernard	Joe Ainsworth	30 April 1996
Connie considers whether to rekindle a lost romance with Francis; Ritchie is still trying to grab glory for the band while getting to grips with army life while fame and fortune are beckoning Cathy.
8	"Episode 8"	Ken Horn	Joe Ainsworth	7 May 1996
As the police close in, Nick knows he must take responsibility.

== Filming locations ==
The show was set in Liverpool, Merseyside in 1960 where two families have very different lifestyles but find their paths crossing.

== Home media ==
Notably, the series was never to be released on DVD or VHS.
