= Vision Action =

UK-based charity

- Founded: 1985
- Type: UK registered charity
- Purpose: Optometry
- Location: Crawley, West Sussex
- Region served: Africa
- Product: Optometry
- Method: Direct delivery
- Key people: Bryony Ellis, founder Honorary VP: Fiona Bruce; Honorary VP: Sir Trevor MacDonald
- Revenue: £500k - £1M
- Employees: Full time: 6 Part time: 3
- Volunteers: 300
- Website: www.vao.org.uk

Vision Action (formerly Vision Aid Overseas - VAO) is a registered charity in the United Kingdom, which provides optical aid and services to developing countries in Africa.

== History ==
In 1985, a group of British optometrists and dispensing opticians each took two weeks out of their businesses to establish clinics in Tanzania, where they tested the eyes of local people and dispensed second-hand spectacles collected in UK. After the project gained publicity via the media and resultant public support, they formalised their efforts by registering the charity Vision Aid Overseas (VAO) in 1987.

Founded on the delivery of direct service to patient, since registering as a charity, VAO has operated direct service clinics in 23 countries and tested the eyes of over 600,000 patients, helping over 350,000 people to see with a pair of spectacles.

In the 1997 New Years Honours list, founder Brian Ellis was awarded the MBE.

From 2010 to 2020, VAO organized a recycling scheme collecting used glasses from the public in the UK for sorting and recycling. The program was stopped when its operating costs became too burdening for the non-profit.

In January 2022, VAO announced its merger with Vision for a Nation Foundation. In November 2022, Vision Aid Overseas became Vision Action.

== Operations ==
Vision Action today focuses it operations around three core services:

- Optical Training: Establish International Vision Centres where high quality spectacles can be manufactured and sold at an affordable price following a thorough eye examination
- Optical Workshop Development: Train local healthcare workers in practical eye testing and vision health skills that equips them to work as primary eyecare workers in their local communities
- Direct Service Deliver: Utilize the expertise of UK optical professionals who develop outreach services in areas away from existing facilities and who undertake teaching programmes across the developing world

VAO presently runs sustainable projects in five target countries: Ethiopia, Malawi, Sierra Leone, Uganda, and Zambia.

== Support ==
VAO Honorary Vice Presidents include competing newsreaders Fiona Bruce of the BBC, and Sir Trevor MacDonald of ITV News. In February 2005 Bruce did the voice over for VAO's Lifeline Appeal, and in 2007 launched VAO's Annual Review.

The charity has formalised its relationship with the UK eye care industry, and is often the chosen charity supported by many dispensing opticians, and professionals via the Worshipful Company of Spectacle Makers, who collect old spectacles from customers for recycling via VAO.

The charity gained publicity in 2005 after the death of Countdown game show host Richard Whiteley. After his death, his longtime partner Kathryn Apanowicz donated three pairs of Whiteley's spectacles to VAO, who sent them with a team of optical professionals to Ethiopia, where they were fitted to three locals with the same prescription. The BBC followed this story on their Inside Out programme, which was broadcast on 19 September 2007.
