= Mary Smith (EastEnders) =

Fictional character in the BBC soap opera EastEnders

- EastEnders character
- Portrayed by: Linda Davidson
- Duration: 1985–1988, 2019, 2022
- First appearance: Episode 5; 5 March 1985
- Last appearance: Episode 6606; 12 December 2022
- Introduced by: Julia Smith (1985); John Yorke (2019); Chris Clenshaw (2022)
- Book appearances: Growing Wild
In-universe information
- Other names: Theresa Smith
- Occupation: Stripper; Launderette assistant Cleaner
- Father: Chris Smith
- Mother: Edie Smith
- Brothers: Brendan Smith; Gary Smith
- Sisters: Bridey Smith
- Daughters: Annie Smith
- Aunts: Maureen

Mary Smith, also known as Mary the Punk, is a fictional character from the BBC soap opera EastEnders, played by Linda Davidson, from 5 March 1985 to 26 May 1988. Punk Mary is Walford's original wild child. She often makes life difficult for herself due to her stubborn, defensive nature and she tends to feel that everyone around her is out to get her. In fact, Mary is her own worst enemy and most of her misfortune is down to her irresponsible behaviour and her inability to heed good advice. Davidson's return to the soap for a single episode was announced in December 2018. She returns for the funeral of Doctor Legg (Leonard Fenton) in episode 5871, originally broadcast on 19 February 2019. Davidson reprised the role of Mary again in 2022 for the funeral of Dot Cotton (June Brown).

== Creation and development ==
Mary Smith was one of the original twenty-three characters invented by the creators of EastEnders, Tony Holland and Julia Smith. Mary's original character outline as written by Smith and Holland appeared in an abridged form in their book, EastEnders: The Inside Story.

"Aged 19. Mary was brought up in Stockport. Her parents were Irish Catholics. ... Her father is a long-distance lorry driver. ... When she left school Mary could hardly read or write, she didn't learn because she didn't want to. ... She gave no trouble, no aggro, but no-one took any notice of her. ... Her mother nagged her about her soul. ... At 15 she went to a gig with a crowd of people from school and in one night her life changed. ... She fell in love with a band, a man and a culture. She had found her own religion. ... She became pregnant. ... Semi-literate, unskilled and at the same time ashamed. ... She couldn't go back to the oppressive society of her childhood, where everybody judged everybody and where she would be labelled, even by her own mother, as a 'loose woman'. ... She wouldn't have an abortion. ... She drifted into our area, and became one of the single parent families that congregate there...Will she be a survivor, or a loser?...Over the months she may develop a fear of authority. ... Maybe she will be forced to drift into a life of prostitution." (page 56).

As Holland and Smith wanted a diverse cross-section from the East End community, it was decided that one of the main cast had to be a young, single mother, and as punk music was prominent in British culture at the time, they decided to use a punk image for the character. Holland and Smith decided to cast an unknown actress in the role. They chose Linda Davidson, who was the right age and had been brought up in northern England and therefore had an accent that would befit the character's background. However, actress Jenna Russell revealed in 2016 that the part was originally offered to her, saying, "I was asked to play Mary Smith in the show right in the beginning when it started in 1985, but I was very young and it wasn't the right fit for me then".

Mary was one of the most striking of the original characters: a lone mother with a small baby, who hid herself under punk makeup, was unable to read or write and was a northerner alone in a southern city.

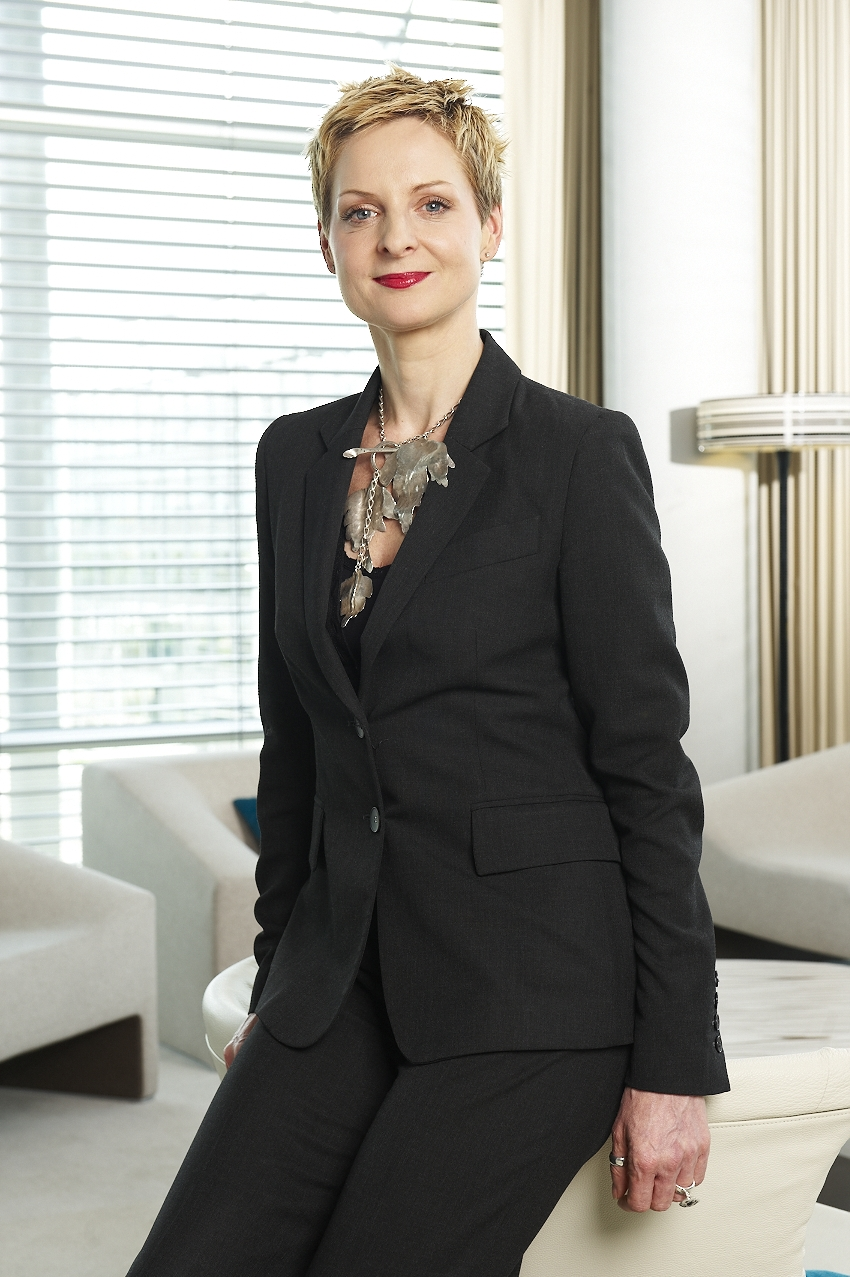
Davidson reprised the role for one episode in 2019 for the funeral of Doctor Legg.

One of the most controversial storylines the character was involved in was her dalliance with prostitution in 1987, although it did earn the programme a considerable amount of negative press at the time and was accused of promoting a negative association between single mothers and prostitution. The character of Mary lasted in the show for three years, and was eventually written out of the series when Linda Davidson decided to leave in order pursue other acting roles. On-screen, Mary leaves Walford the way she arrives, running away from her parents.

Mary and Lofty's return was confirmed by the BBC on 18 December. The characters return for the funeral of original character Doctor Legg (Leonard Fenton), who returned to the soap in 2018. Mary appears in one episode broadcast in 2019. Executive consultant John Yorke invited Davidson to reprise the role and described Mary as a "huge iconic characters, and a central part of the show's DNA". He added that he was excited to have the characters return for one episode where they play "small but incredibly important roles". Davidson expressed her delight at reprising the role and said she was "so thrilled, and very proud" to return to the soap. She commented, "EastEnders was my first proper family. It gave me stability and a fantastic foundation from which to build an incredible life."

== Storylines ==
=== 1985–1988 ===
Mary arrives in Walford in March 1985 when she is housed in Reg Cox's (Johnnie Clayton) old council flat (23b Albert Square), following his death, bringing her daughter, Annie Smith. Mary had been touring with a punk group when she got pregnant and moved to London to escape her overbearing family who viewed Mary's choice of lifestyle with contempt. Single mother Mary finds bringing her daughter up extremely difficult. She has little money and virtually no experience, and her inability to listen to anyone's advice means that she often makes mistakes with her daughter's welfare. This is compounded by the fact that Mary is illiterate; Annie is nearly harmed when Mary gives her the wrong dosage of medication.

Mary is an incredibly irresponsible mother and almost everyone on the Square has a turn at looking after Annie at one time or another. Most take pity on Mary and are willing to help her out, which she regularly uses to her advantage. Mary makes an unlikely friendship with local busybody, Dot Cotton (June Brown), who will regularly be put upon to babysit for baby Annie whilst Mary goes out to party or earns cash. Although Dot likes to preach to Mary, she is one of the few people that Mary listens to on Albert Square. Strapped for cash, Mary finds it difficult to provide for Annie, so her friend Sheena Mennell (Dulice Liecier) talks her into becoming a stripper and she regularly dances for married shopkeeper Saeed Jeffery (Andrew Johnson). One night when Mary is out stripping, she leaves Annie in the care of Sheena. Sheena then leaves Annie alone while she goes out with a client. Mary's neighbour, Sue Osman (Sandy Ratcliff), finds Annie before any harm can come to her, but Mary subsequently cuts all ties with Sheena.

In February 1986, nurse Andy O'Brien (Ross Davidson) tries to help Mary by teaching her to read. However, Mary falls in love with him so she stops stripping and drops her punk image to impress him. Andy is forced to reject her advances, and an angst-ridden Mary spitefully informs him that she will not be attending any more of his reading lessons. The following day her punk image is back. However, without her stripping job, she is now penniless again. Nick Cotton (John Altman), seeing her in a desperate state, tries to coax her into becoming a prostitute. Mary declines, but her desperation for money makes her question whether it would be such a bad idea after all. Luckily, Andy manages to put a stop to this by getting her a job working in a hospital canteen.

Mary later has a relationship with the married Mehmet Osman (Haluk Bilginer), but he is only using her to win a bet with his brother Ali Osman (Nejdet Salih). After months of chasing, Mehmet finally manages to have sex with Mary, and he triumphantly claims his winnings from his brother. However, Mary witnesses his gloating and she furiously vows to get revenge. After sabotaging his car, she proceeds to make regular crank calls to his cab firm. Things then get worse for Mary when she quits her job at the canteen after she is promoted but afraid to admit that she cannot read. Once again she finds herself desperate for money. By December 1986, Mary is persuaded to turn to prostitution by Pat Wicks (Pam St Clement), who is being pimped by Mehmet. By early 1987, Mary has flung herself wholeheartedly into prostitution, much to the concern of everyone on the Square. Pat has a change of heart and starts refusing to give Mary any more contacts, so Mary decides that she will find her contacts on her own. She starts making regular trips to Central London and comes home late one night covered in bruises and blood. Initially, Mary claims that she had been beaten by the Walford attacker — a man who had assaulted several other women in the area — but she later confesses that she had been beaten by other prostitutes for trying to poach their clients.

Despite this, Mary refuses to stop prostituting herself, even when the healthcare worker, Carmel Roberts (Judith Jacob), warns her that her baby might be taken away from her if she continues. Mary is furious and rampages around to find out who had reported her to Carmel. An anonymous letter from Dot Cotton puts Sue in the frame, and this leads to Mary viciously attacking Sue in the café one night. Mary is later arrested for soliciting, which leaves her with a large fine. However, even this doesn't stop her prostituting herself. Mary's unsocial hours mean that she is often forced to leave baby Annie alone at night whilst she goes out to work the streets. This culminates in Annie nearly dying in a fire one night when she is left alone. Luckily for Mary, she is rescued by Arthur Fowler (Bill Treacher) before she is harmed. Dot can no longer stand the maltreatment of Annie so she contacts Mary's parents, Chris Smith (Allan O'Keefe) and Edie Smith (Eileen O'Brien), who arrive in Walford and demand to take Annie back with them to Stockport. Mary initially refuses, but she eventually realises that her burnt-out flat is no place for a baby, so she begrudgingly allows Annie to go.

In 1987, Mary begins a relationship with Rod Norman (Christopher McHallem); a good-hearted, scruffy, layabout who has a soft-spot for women in distress. Rod is a good influence on Mary and desperately tries to get her to stop prostituting herself, regain control of her life. Rod is also instrumental in helping Mary regain custody of Annie. However, Social services are now involved, as Mary's mother decides to apply for full custody of Annie. Mary is frequently frustrated by the amount of time it is taking for Social Services to decide who should have custody of Annie, but Rod keeps her going and even manages to get her a job as cleaner in The Dagmar winebar. Still, Edie refuses to give Annie back, so Rod tries a different tactic. He phones Chris and tells him that Mary is threatening to kill herself unless she gets her baby. The lie works and by the end of the year, Mary's father arrives on the Square bringing baby Annie back to an overjoyed Mary. Chris desperately tries to convince Mary to return to Stockport with him for a family Christmas. She refuses, but on Christmas Eve, after getting extremely drunk, Chris snatches baby Annie and attempts to drive her back to Stockport with him, only to crash his car into a garden wall before he can leave. Annie survives, but Mary finds it hard to forgive her father for his near-fatal mistake.

In 1988, Mary and Rod begin to go through some problems, which eventually leads to them splitting up. Mary begins to behave erratically again, regularly taking drugs and begging around the Square for money to fund her habit. She begins to neglect Annie again and even dumps her on Sue while she disappears for a week without informing anyone she is going. She becomes an unwitting pawn in Simon Wicks's (Nick Berry) game to bed as many women as possible and is later hurt when he cruelly rejects her. Her father tries desperately to help her regain control of her life, giving her a job as receptionist at his new haulage company. However, upon the arrival of her mother, Edie, Mary decides she is sick of her family's interference, and after vandalising her father's business with paint, she takes Annie, jumps on a bus and leaves Walford, sticking up two fingers in the air as she goes.

=== 2019, 2022 ===
Over thirty years later, Mary and Annie (now played by Marilyn O'Brien) return for the funeral of Doctor Legg (Leonard Fenton), where they reunite with old friends, Dot, Lofty Holloway (Tom Watt), Sharon Mitchell (Letitia Dean), and Kathy Beale (Gillian Taylforth). They reminisce and Mary thanks Dot for her help with Annie as a child, before leaving. Mary returns over three years later for Dot's funeral, explaining to Sharon that after Legg's funeral she set up a WhatsApp group with Lofty and Colin Russell (Michael Cashman) in order to keep in touch, which was how she found out that Dot had died. She shares her experiences with Dot during her step-granddaughter Sonia Fowler (Natalie Cassidy)'s eulogy, where she agrees with Disa O'Brien (Jan Graveson) that Dot saw something worth saving in those that people would have deemed lost causes such as herself.

== Reception ==
In 2020, Sara Wallis and Ian Hyland from The Daily Mirror placed Mary 82nd on their ranked list of the best EastEnders characters of all time, commenting that the name "Mary the Punk" did "suit" the character.
