= Gary McDonald (actor) =

English actor (born 1961)

Gary McDonald (born 1961, London) is an English actor of Jamaican descent. A student at Elliott School in Putney, McDonald played football for Wimbledon FC under Dario Gradi.

== Acting career ==
McDonald was a member of the Royal Court Theatre from 1979 to 1980, appearing in various plays at the Court such as Hard Time Pressure, Hero's Welcome, and Che Walker's Been So Long. In the 1980s, he performed with Talawa Theatre Company in The Black Jacobins, The Importance of Being Earnest, and A Raisin in the Sun with the Black Theatre Co-operative. He appeared at the Royal National Theatre in Macbeth, Black Poppies, and Rhapsody in Black & White and at the Cottesloe Theatre in Blood Wedding. Other theatre credits include Scrape of the Black and Mike Leigh's It's a Great Big Shame at the Theatre Royal Stratford East.

McDonald's first notable television role came in 1987 when he was cast as Darren Roberts in the BBC soap opera EastEnders. He left the role in 1988. He has also appeared in Numb3ers, The Bill, Between the Lines, South of the Border, as Captain John Black in Dream Team (1999–2006) and in Brothers and Sisters, among others. He has appeared in various films.

== Filmography ==
- Death in Paradise as Temmy Verga, episode 5.4 (2016)
- Titanfall (2014) Video game
- The Shepherd: Border Patrol (2008)
- Numb3rs (2005)
- The Basil Brush Show (2003)
- Wondrous Oblivion (2003) – Gary Sobers
- Casualty (2003, 2007)
- Murder in Mind – Favours (2003) – DC Jed Culshaw
- Babyfather (2002) – Kevin
- Doctors – "Testing Testing" (2002) – PC Aidan Brown
- Fields of Gold (2002) (TV) – Johnson
- All or Nothing (2002) – Neville
- The Bill (2002) – Ronnie Jackson; (1999) – Steve Bryant
- Out (2001) – John
- Brothers and Sisters (1998) – Wycliffe Leonard
- The Spanish Prisoner (1997) – Ticket Agent
- Secrets & Lies (1996) – Boxer
- Thief Takers (1996) – DC Alan Oxford
- Bliss (1995) TV – Gee
- Mrs. Hartley and the Growth Centre (1995) TV – Gary
- What You Lookin' At? (1993) TV series – Linford
- Love Hurts – "Band of Gold" (1993) TV Episode – Dennis
- Between the Lines – "Breaking Point" (1992) TV episode – PC Cameron
- Young Soul Rebels (1991) – Davis
- Struck by Lightning (1990)
- Shooting Stars (1990) – Calvin
- EastEnders (1985) TV series – Darren Roberts (1987–1988)
- Top Kids (1987) (TV)
- The Passion of Remembrance (1986) – Michael
- London's Burning: The Movie (1986) TV – Ethnic
- Outbreak of Hostilities (1982) TV
