= Saeed Jeffery =

- EastEnders character
- Portrayed by: Andrew Johnson
- First appearance: Episode 1 "Poor Old Reg"; 19 February 1985
- Last appearance: Episode 90; 26 December 1985
- Introduced by: Julia Smith
In-universe information
- Occupation: Shopkeeper
- Brothers: Ashraf Jeffery
- Sisters: Zubeida
- Wife: Naima Jeffery (until 1986)
- First cousins: Naima Jeffery
- Other relatives: Ashraf Karim

Saeed Jeffery is a fictional character from the BBC soap opera EastEnders, played by Andrew Johnson from 19 February to 26 December 1985.

Saeed is the original owner of the First til Last grocery store. He is never truly accepted in Walford, and his arranged marriage ends in divorce after it is discovered that he has been making obscene phone calls to women. He leaves Walford in disgrace, leaving his business to his wife.

== Character creation and development ==
Saeed Jeffery was one of the original twenty-three characters invented by the creators of EastEnders, Tony Holland and Julia Smith. Saeed and his wife Naima were the first Asian characters to appear in the soap. Black and Asian characters were two ethnic minorities that had previously been under-represented in British soap before EastEnders aired. Holland and Smith knew that for the soap to succeed there needed to be a varied group of characters, so that several different sections of the audience had someone to identify with. Additionally, if the programme was to be realistic, it had to reflect the cross-section of society that actually existed in the real location. For these reasons, different sexes, ages, classes, religions and races were all included in the original character line-up. Both Holland and Smith had been at the forefront of the move towards 'integrated casting' in television and had encountered an array of ethnic diversities in the process. Even though the ethnic minority groups were deemed the hardest to research, Holland and Smith called upon their contacts to relay information about their origins and lifestyles and were then able to portray Walford's most recent immigrants more realistically. Saeed was named after one of Tony Holland's Bengali friends. Holland had attended Saeed's arranged marriage, and he thought the notion of an arranged marriage, particularly an unhappy one, would be an interesting and informative topic to tackle in the soap.

Saeed's original character outline as written by Smith and Holland appeared in an abridged form in their book, EastEnders: The Inside Story (In this passage, Naima will be referred to as Najma).

"He is quarter English, three-quarters Bengali and she is wholly Bengali. Their parents were originally from Bangladesh, formerly East Pakistan, and they are Muslims and cousins...Najma had an easier childhood...He left school at eighteen and went to cramming college for a year...In despair, his parents sent him back to India. He had always felt an outsider in England because he's an Indian (the "paki" at school), but he didn't fit in in India either. The other Bengali children of his generation called him "Sahib"...Najma had an easier childhood. She became aware that she couldn't accept the traditional role of an Indian wife, but she wasn't enough of a rebel to leave home and adopt a totally different lifestyle...Saeed's mother's father became seriously ill. It was decided that Saeed's parents should return home to India, and a hasty marriage was arranged between Najma and Saeed so the young couple could then run the food store...They are in a confusing situation, accepting the customs of their parents, yet - because of having been born, brought up and educated in this country - feeling that they're slightly English...Neither of them is particularly docile, having lived through the jungle of the school playground, and the cut and thrust of working-class urban life...Saeed and Najma will make a big effort to mix, and most of the time, fail...Saeed might even visit the pub, and try to give the impression that he's a real cockney...but he wouldn't want to go home to a cockney wife." (page 58)

Andrew Johnson auditioned for the part and had a lot in common with Saeed. Like Saeed, he'd been born of mixed races and cultures, and like Saeed, he'd found that it led to confusions as he grew up and he didn't know whether to categorise himself as Asian or English. At the interview he was heated on the subject of the "image" of Asians on television, which began to make Holland and Smith apprehensive about casting him. They feared that he may only want his race depicted in a certain way, only sympathetically or with dignity. They also worried about his physical stature. He was six feet tall, whilst Shreela Ghosh (the actress playing his wife) was only five feet three, which sparked worries over how the two could both be contained in the same shot. Despite their initial worries, it was decided that Johnson's similarities with the character would be advantageous and he was cast in the role.

Saeed ran the corner shop, and his early storylines depicted the problems of his arranged marriage and portrayed a character caught between two cultures. Of the two, Saeed was the more keen partner in the marriage, but continuously found himself being pushed away by his wife. Despite being labelled as a stereotypical portrayal of Asian people today, at the time in the 80s such issues had not been widely covered, particularly on mainstream television.

However, Holland and Smith's initial fears regarding Johnson's apprehension to play the character in anything but a dignified way, came to fruition. Problems arose between Johnson and the script-writers when they attempted to involve Saeed in some unsavoury storylines, such as his tendency to visit prostitutes and make obscene phone calls to a female resident on the Square. Johnson was somewhat disturbed at the prospect of his character displaying simple human weaknesses, and so the decision was made to write the character out. On-screen Saeed and Naima's marriage collapsed, they eventually split and Saeed moved to Bangladesh. He departed on Boxing Day 1985, making him the first EastEnders character to permanently leave the series (Mark Fowler had departed in April that year, but would make several returns to the series, eventually returning on a permanent basis). Johnson spoke out about the "contentious storylines" his character was involved with at the time, commenting, "I felt the scripts could damage race relations. Most people know nothing about Asians. Too many think they're greasy, horrible people who take jobs that Brits should have."

== Storylines ==
London-born Saeed claims to be a Cockney but is looked upon as Asian by everyone in Walford. Inexperienced and naive, he took over the family business (the corner shop at 71 Bridge Street) when his parents retired to their native Bangladesh. Although his father was well liked in the community, Saeed is seen as an outsider, particularly by Lou Beale (Anna Wing), who regularly comments that he doesn't belong or know how to take care of his customers.

Saeed is unhappy in his arranged marriage to his unwilling wife, Naima (Shreela Ghosh), who shares a flat with him at 47B Albert Square. Naima doesn't like Saeed much and spends most of her time trying to undermine him; rebelling against the customs that her parents forced her to live by. Naima refuses to share her husband's bed and Saeed starts visiting prostitutes and later the strip-club where Mary Smith (Linda Davidson) works.

After continual pressure, Naima relents and finally consummates her marriage to Saeed, improving things between the couple, but their marital bliss is short-lived. Naima receives an anonymous letter from Dot Cotton (June Brown), who has discovered Saeed's sordid exploits. Dot feels it is her Christian duty to inform Saeed's wife, and when Naima confronts Saeed, he does not deny it so she leaves him.

A few months later, Saeed is discovered making secret obscene phone calls to Naima's friend, Debbie Wilkins (Shirley Cheriton). When Naima learns of this, she files for divorce. Feeling humiliated and alone, Saeed takes his parents' advice and moves to Bangladesh, where he allegedly remarries and lives happily with his new wife and their seven children. It is also mentioned that Saeed works as a translator for the government in Dhaka. His last appearance is on 26 December 1985 where his final scene is an emotional farewell with Lou Beale before departing in a taxi. After Saeed's departure, Naima remains in Walford and runs the shop on her own until 1987, when she remarries and also returns to Bangladesh.
