= Richard Whiteley =

British television personality and journalist (1943–2005)

Richard Whiteley OBE DL
- Whiteley in the early 2000s
- Born: John Richard Whiteley; 28 December 1943; Bradford, West Riding of Yorkshire, England
- Died: 26 June 2005 (aged 61); Leeds, West Yorkshire, England
- Education: Christ's College, Cambridge
- Occupations: Journalist, game show host
- Years active: 1968–2005
- Known for: Hosting Countdown (1982–2005; his death)
- Spouse: Candy Watson (m. 1973; div. 1975)
- Partners: Jeni Cropper (1970s–80s); Kathryn Apanowicz (from 1994)
- Children: 1

John Richard Whiteley (28 December 1943 – 26 June 2005) was an English presenter and journalist, best known for his 23 years as host of the game show Countdown. Countdown was the launch programme for Channel 4 at 4:45 pm on 2 November 1982, and Whiteley was the first person to be seen on the channel (not counting a programme montage). Whiteley enjoyed projecting the image of an absent-minded eccentric. His trademarks were his jolly, avuncular manner, his fondness for puns, and his bold, sometimes garish wardrobe.

Thanks to over 20 years' worth of daily instalments of Countdown as well as his work on the Yorkshire magazine programme Calendar and various other television projects, at the time of his death Whiteley was believed to have clocked more hours on British television screens—and more than 10,000 appearances—than anyone else alive, apart from Carole Hersee, who appeared as a young girl on the BBC's Test Card F.

== Early life ==
Richard Whiteley was born on 28 December 1943 in Bradford, West Riding of Yorkshire, the first child of Thomas (1912–1992) and Margaret (née Bentley) Whiteley (1918–2001); he had a younger sister, Helen, who died in March 1998 aged 49 of cancer. Whiteley spent his childhood in Baildon: his family owned a long-established textile mill, Thomas Whiteley and Co of Eccleshill, which went out of business in the 1960s. At 13, he won a scholarship to Giggleswick School, Yorkshire, where his English teacher was Russell Harty. He later became a governor of the school. From 1962, he read English at Christ's College, Cambridge.

== Career ==
=== Early career ===
On leaving Cambridge in July 1965, Whiteley served three years as a trainee at ITN but left to join the newly created Yorkshire Television in July 1968.

In 1973, Whiteley and Woodrow Wyatt presented the Anglia Television documentary The Red Under the Bed, about the trial of the Shrewsbury Two (Des Warren and Ricky Tomlinson) which was broadcast on the day that the trial jury retired to consider their verdict. The programme, which was heavily critical of the trade union movement, is now considered to have swayed jurors into returning a guilty verdict and was later cited by the Criminal Cases Review Commission as evidence that the verdicts were unsound. Warren and Tomlinson's convictions were overturned in 2021. Speaking in 2017 about the documentary, Tomlinson claimed to be in possession of confidential documents proving that it had been funded and written by British intelligence services and that Whiteley had been employed by MI5 at the time of broadcast.

Whiteley was bitten by a ferret on an edition of Calendar in 1977. The animal bit his finger for half a minute before its owner, Brian Plummer, prised it free. The clip is often repeated on programmes showing television outtakes and Whiteley once joked that when he died, the headlines would read, "Ferret man dies". He said, "It's made a lot of people laugh and it's been shown all over the world. It's 30-odd years since it happened and I think I've been a great PR man for the ferret industry. Ferrets have a lot to be grateful for; to me, you see, they've become acceptable because one of them bit me."

=== Countdown ===
In 1982, Yorkshire Television began to produce Countdown, copying a French quiz show format, Des chiffres et des lettres. Whiteley was chosen as host and continued with the show when Jeremy Isaacs brought it to Channel 4 as the first programme broadcast by the new station. Its first broadcast received over 3.5 million viewers, but the programme lost 3 million viewers for its second show.

However, it gradually rebuilt its audience over the following weeks. It was as the host of Countdown that Whiteley became known to a wider audience in the United Kingdom outside the Yorkshire region. He was nicknamed "Twice Nightly Whiteley", in reference to the time when he would present the Calendar news programme and Countdown in the same evening, from 1982 to 1995. (In a self-deprecating joke, he often countered this with "Once Yearly, Nearly".)

As the presenter of Countdown, Whiteley developed a reputation for wearing garish suits and ties, and it was common for Carol Vorderman to comment on this. Whiteley also told many anecdotes and puns, which were often met by groans from other presenters and audience members. He was granted the honorary title of "Mayor of Wetwang" in 1998 and was known for his amusement at the village's name.

Countdown was not intended to be a long-lasting format. Still, it quickly became a durable programme for Channel 4, at its peak enjoying a sizeable afternoon audience of almost five million. At the time of Whiteley's death, it still regularly attracted over a million viewers.

From series 54, broadcast in 2005–06, the series champion has received the "Richard Whiteley Memorial Trophy" in his honour. Following his death, Whiteley was replaced by Des Lynam.

=== Other work ===
Whiteley also had his own chatshow, Richard Whiteley Unbriefed, on the BBC. His guests were unknown to him beforehand, so before he could interview them, he had to guess who they were.

Whiteley was one of the first people to report on the 1984 Brighton hotel bombing, as he was staying in the hotel at the time. He was the subject of This Is Your Life in March 1997 when he was surprised by Michael Aspel on the set of the ITV soap opera, Emmerdale.

In 2001, Whiteley stood as rector for University of Dundee.

On 15 June 2003, Whiteley appeared on the BBC show, Top Gear and set the slowest time in the Star in a Reasonably-Priced Car segment with a time of 2:06.

== Illness and death ==
In May 2005, Whiteley was taken into hospital with pneumonia. He made a slow recovery from the illness, but doctors discovered problems with his heart and carried out an emergency operation for endocarditis on 24 June. This operation was not successful and, two days later on 26 June, Whiteley died at Leeds General Infirmary aged 61. He was buried at St John the Evangelist Church at East Witton, the village where he and his partner Kathryn Apanowicz lived.

Whiteley had suffered from asthma since he was very young and had diabetes. The edition of Countdown that was due to be broadcast on 27 June was postponed as a mark of respect. Carol Vorderman gave an emotional tribute to him on 28 June when Countdown returned, stating that "The clock stopped too soon". Several shows had already been recorded before he went into hospital. His final show was broadcast on 1 July 2005, which was the grand final of the 53rd series.

== Memorials ==
=== Organ donation ===
Whiteley was an organ donor, and it was reported his corneas were donated to help two people.

=== Memorial service ===
On 10 November 2005, five months after his death, thousands of friends and admirers gathered at York Minster for a memorial service to celebrate Whiteley's life. Guests included his co-presenter Carol Vorderman, who paid tribute to him, saying, "If he were here, he would have welcomed you one-by-one, greeting every one of you by the hand and would have wanted a photograph taken".

=== Richard Whiteley Memorial Bursary ===
In 2007, Channel 4 announced its creation of the Richard Whiteley Memorial Bursary, a nine-month work experience placement at Yorkshire Television, working with True North Productions.

=== Vision Aid Overseas ===
Three pairs of Whiteley's spectacles were donated by Kathryn Apanowicz, his longtime partner, to optical charity Vision Aid Overseas (VAO). Sent with a team of optical professionals to Ethiopia, the VAO team found three Ethiopians whose eyes fitted Whiteley's prescription. The BBC followed this story on their Inside Out programme which was broadcast on 19 September 2007.

=== Giggleswick School ===
In 2008, three years after Whiteley's death, Giggleswick School announced its plans to raise £1.3m to build a theatre in his honour. The 288-seat theatre has been built at the school where Whiteley was a pupil and governor and provided a resource for the whole local community. Crews completed work on the second phase of the theatre in autumn 2010. The theatre now hosts a range of public performances.

== Honours ==
Whiteley was honoured with the Mayoralty of Wetwang in 1998, became a Deputy Lieutenant of West Yorkshire in 2003, and was appointed OBE in the June 2004 Queen's Birthday Honours List for services to broadcasting.

== Bibliography ==
=== Books by Richard Whiteley ===
- Letters Play!: a treasury of words and wordplay. London: Robson ISBN 0-86051-992-9
- Whiteley, Richard (2000) Himoff!: the memoirs of a TV matinee idle London: Orion Books ISBN 0-7528-4345-1

=== Biographies ===
- Apanowicz, Kathryn (2006) Richard by Kathryn. London: Virgin Books ISBN 1-85227-375-5

== TV appearances ==
- The Red Under the Bed (1973)
- Calendar (1968–1995)
- Countdown (1982–2005) (Channel 4's launch programme)
- Hallelujah! (1983)
- The Richard Whiteley Show (1995–1996)
- Richard Whiteley Unbriefed (1999)
- Have I Got News for You (Series 17, Episode 1, 1999)
- Fat Friends (Series 1, Episode 1, October 2000)
- Holiday: You Call the Shots (2001–2002)
- The Big Breakfast (final episode, 29 March 2002)
- About a Boy (2002) (cameo appearance)
- Top Gear (2003)
- SMTV Live (final episode, 27 December 2003)
- My Family (2003)
- Footage of Whiteley appears in the 2014 film Pride, where he reports on the end of the miners' strike.

== Obituaries ==
- "Richard Whiteley" (The Daily Telegraph, 28 June 2005)
- "Thousands say farewell to 'Our Richard'" BBC News, 10 November 2005)
- "Farewell to a jolly good egg" (The Guardian, 28 June 2005)
