= Lisa Faulkner =

English actress and TV presenter (born 1972)

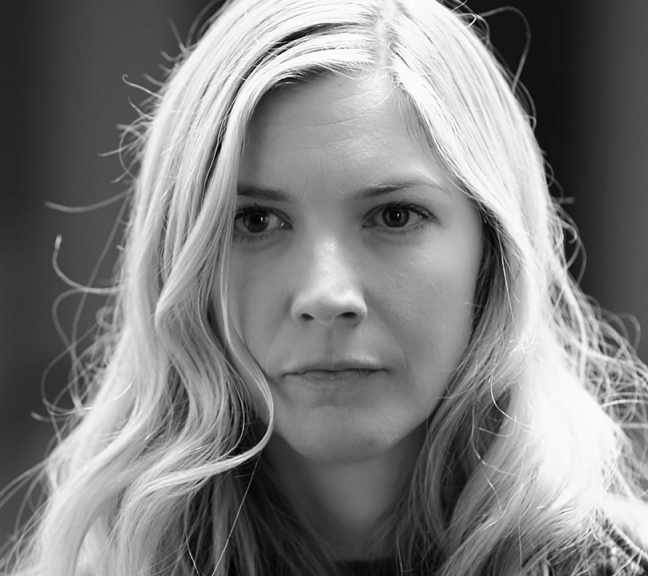
- Faulkner in 2012
- Born: Lisa Tamsin Faulkner; 19 February 1972 (age 54); Merton, London, England
- Occupations: Actress; cook; presenter
- Years active: 1992–present
- Spouses: Chris Coghill (m. 2005; div. 2011); John Torode (m. 2019)
- Children: 1
- Website: www.lisafaulkner.co.uk

Lisa Tamsin Faulkner (born 19 February 1972) is an English actress, presenter and home cook. She has had roles in The Lover (1992), Dangerfield (1995), Brookside (1997–1998), Holby City (1999–2001), Spooks (2002), Burn It (2003), Murder in Suburbia (2004–2005), New Street Law (2006–2007), Murdoch Mysteries (2010–2012), EastEnders (2017) and The Girl Before (2021).

Faulkner has also carved out a career as a TV presenter and cook, having won Celebrity MasterChef as a contestant in 2010.

== Early life ==
Faulkner was born in Merton, London, to David Faulkner and Julie (née Day). She lived in Esher and was educated at Tiffin Girls' School in Kingston upon Thames. When she was sixteen, her mother, Julie, died from throat cancer. Faulkner has since discussed her bereavement in a number of newspaper and magazine interviews.

== Career ==
At the age of 16, Faulkner was approached by a modelling scout while she was waiting on the platform of a London tube station.

In 1992, she made her first acting appearance in The Lover. At age 23, Faulkner played the part of Alison Dangerfield in the TV drama Dangerfield. She also starred in the 1995 film A Feast at Midnight. In 1996, she appeared in And the Beat Goes On. Two years later, she played Louise Hope in the Channel 4 soap Brookside. Between 1999 and 2001, she played Victoria Merrick in Holby City.

In the TV show Spooks, her character Helen Flynn was killed off early in the first series in a particularly brutal fashion, which caused some controversy but helped to establish the gritty nature of the show.

In 2004, she starred on ITV as D.S. Emma Scribbins ("Scribbs") in Murder in Suburbia, in which she played a CID policewoman in company with Caroline Catz, who played her boss, D.I. Ashurst. The show returned for a second series in 2005, with Scribbs adopting the then popular fashion style of "boho-chic". In 2006, she starred in the TV series New Street Law. From June 2008, Faulkner narrated the BBC One show Heir Hunters, replacing Nadia Sawalha, until 2017.

She regularly taught at Amanda Redman's Artists Theatre School. Faulkner was voted one of FHM's "100 Sexiest Women in the World" six times between 1999 and 2004. She regularly contributed to Big Brother's Little Brother, a magazine programme about the reality UK TV show Big Brother on Channel 4. She was also a regular contributor to the Sky1 magazine show Angela and Friends.

In 2010, she won Celebrity Masterchef, beating Christine Hamilton and Dick Strawbridge in the final. She appeared in the third series premiere of the Canadian series Murdoch Mysteries when the series filmed an episode in and around Bristol, England, that was broadcast in 2010, and she returned for her second guest appearance in the fourth series in 2011. She also appeared twice in the fifth series. She co-hosted Real Food Family Cook Off on Channel 5 with Matt Dawson. The series was broadcast in 2011. In 2013, she co-hosted the daytime Channel 4 series What's Cooking? with Ben Shephard and, in 2015, was reunited with Shephard to co-host an episode of This Morning Summer. In March 2017, it was announced that she would be joining EastEnders as Fi Browning, a "stylish and sophisticated" businesswoman. Fi was later revealed to be Sophie Willmott-Brown, the daughter of Kathy Beale's rapist James Willmott-Brown. In March 2019, Faulkner and John Torode were given a weekend cooking show. They host John And Lisa's Weekend Kitchen on ITV. In July 2019, Faulkner appeared on Celebrity Gogglebox alongside friend Nicola Stephenson.

== Personal life ==
In 2005, Faulkner married Chris Coghill, one of her co-stars in the 2003 TV drama series Burn It, in Richmond Park, London. The couple adopted a fifteen-month-old girl who was born in 2006. The couple separated and divorced in 2011. In 2019 she married Australian chef John Torode, They work together on presenting John and Lisa's Weekend Kitchen.

In July 2026, Faulkner revealed that she had been diagnosed with early‑stage breast cancer and had undergone surgery to remove the cancer.

== Filmography ==
| Year | Title | Role | Notes |
|---|---|---|---|
| 1992 | The Lover | Helene Lagonelle | Film |
| 1994 | A Feast at Midnight | Miss Charlotte | Film |
| 1994 | Le péril jeune | Barbara | Film |
| 1995 | Dangerfield | Alison Dangerfield | Series 1–2; 18 episodes |
| 1995 | Casualty | Cassie Tolchard | Episode: "Not Waving But Drowning" |
| 1996 | And the Beat Goes On | Christine Spencer | 1 series; 8 episodes |
| 1997–1998 | Brookside | Louise Hope | Regular role |
| 1999–2001 | Holby City | Victoria Merrick | Series 1–3; regular role, 45 episodes |
| 2002 | Spooks | Helen Flynn | 2 episodes |
| 2003 | Burn It | Emma | 2 series; 13 episodes |
| 2004–2005 | Murder in Suburbia | Det. Sgt. Emma "Scribbs" Scribbins | 2 series; 12 episodes |
| 2005 | New Tricks | Hannah Taylor | 1 episode |
| 2006–2007 | New Street Law | Laura Scammell | 2 series; 14 episodes |
| 2008–2016 | Heir Hunters | Narrator | Regular voiceover |
| 2010 | Celebrity MasterChef | Contestant | Won the series |
| 2010 | Honeymooner | Emma | Film |
| 2010–2012 | Murdoch Mysteries | Anna Fulford | Canadian television series; 4 episodes |
| 2011 | Death in Paradise | Alex Owen | 1 episode |
| 2011 | Real Food Family Cook Off | Co-presenter | 1 series; with Matt Dawson |
| 2013 | What's Cooking? | Co-presenter | 1 series; with Ben Shephard |
| 2013 | Pixie Hollow Bake Off | Gelata (voice) | Short film |
| 2015 | This Morning | Guest presenter | 1 episode; with Ben Shephard |
| 2017 | EastEnders | Fi Browning | Regular role, 61 episodes |
| 2019–present | John and Lisa's Weekend Kitchen | Co-presenter | With John Torode |
| 2019 | A Confession (TV series) | Girlfriend | 2 episodes |
| 2019 | Celebrity Gogglebox | Herself | With Nicola Stephenson |
| 2021 | Murdoch Mysteries | Anna Fulford | |
| 2021 | The Girl Before | Tessa | |
| 2022 | Waterloo Road | Hannah King | |
| 2024 | The Madame Blanc Mysteries | Violet Oliver | Episode: "Fashion" |
| 2024 | John & Lisa's Food Trip Down Under | Herself | With John Torode |
| 2025 | Missing You | Dana Fells | Episodes 2–5 |

=== Theatre ===
| Year | Title | Role(s) | Playwright | Venue(s) | Ref. |
|---|---|---|---|---|---|
| 2026 | Single White Female | Allie | John Lutz | United Kingdom & Ireland Tour | |

== Awards and nominations ==
| Year | Award | Category | Result | Ref. |
|---|---|---|---|---|
| 2017 | Inside Soap Awards | Best Bad Girl | Nominated | |

== Books ==
- Recipes from my Mother for my Daughter (Simon & Schuster Ltd, 2013) ISBN 978-0-85720-617-6
- The Way I Cook... (Simon & Schuster Ltd, 2013) ISBN 978-0-85720-618-3
- Tea and Cake with Lisa Faulkner (Simon & Schuster Ltd, 2015) ISBN 978-1-4711-2560-7
- From Mother to Mother: Recipes from a family kitchen (Simon & Schuster Ltd, 2018) ISBN 978-1-4711-2562-1
- Meant to Be (Ebury Publishing, 2019) ISBN 978-1-5291-0414-1
