= Kathryn Apanowicz =

British actress (1960–2025)

- Born: 3 June 1960; Bradford, England
- Died: 3 March 2025 (aged 64)
- Occupations: Actress, presenter
- Years active: 1971–2005
- Partner: Richard Whiteley (1994–2005; his death)

Kathryn Apanowicz (/əˈpænəvɪtʃ/ ə-PAN-ə-vitch; 3 June 1960 – 3 March 2025) was a British actress and presenter.

== Background ==
Apanowicz grew up in Horsforth, Leeds, with a brother, Stephen. Her father was a Polish RAF pilot in the Second World War.

From 1994 to 2005, Apanowicz was the partner of Countdown host Richard Whiteley. Whiteley died on 26 June 2005, at the age of 61, after a failed emergency operation due to endocarditis. After his death, she published a biography of Whiteley titled Richard by Kathryn. Apanowicz donated three pairs of Whiteley's spectacles to optical charity Vision Aid Overseas (VAO), who sent them with a team of optical professionals to Ethiopia, where they were fitted to three locals with the same prescription. The BBC followed this story on their Inside Out programme which was broadcast on 19 September 2007.

== Acting career ==
Apanowicz first became involved with television at the age of eleven when she presented the junior-aimed programme Junior Showtime on ITV, before joining Calendar and then turning to acting.

Apanowicz was best known for her 1980s television appearances in the BBC soap operas Angels, in which she played Nurse Rose Butchins, and EastEnders, in which she played the caterer Magda Czajkowski. She also had minor roles in Emmerdale and Coronation Street, and, as a child, appeared in the film Bugsy Malone. Before being cast in these shows, Apanowicz had worked in children's programmes for Yorkshire Television with Mark Curry.

In the early 1990s, she worked at cable channel Wire TV and launched the channel on 4 May 1992. She presented its talk-based magazine programme Afternoon Live.

In 2000, she enjoyed a regular stint as one of the presenters of ITV's daytime magazine show for women, Live Talk. She was both a presenter for BBC Radio Leeds, and a guest presenter for BBC Radio York.

Apanowicz became a friend of Whiteley's Countdown co-host Carol Vorderman. In July 2008, Apanowicz made numerous appearances in the British media criticising Channel 4 bosses for their refusal to negotiate an acceptable pay deal with Vorderman, which had resulted in her departure from the show.

== Death ==
Apanowicz died on 3 March 2025, aged 64, after a long illness.
