= Vision for a Nation Foundation =

British charitable organisation

Vision for a Nation Foundation (VFAN) was established in 2011 by Hong Kong-based philanthropist James Chen who is also the founder of the internationally acclaimed campaign, Clearly. The mission of VFAN was to develop domain expertise on the issue of vision correction for the developing world by creating solutions that overcome the barriers to delivering affordable and accessible eye care. Rwanda was chosen as the first programme country.

In 2022, Vision for a Nation Foundation and Vision Aid Overseas merged to form Vision Action. Vision Action currently supports long-term eye care programmes in Sierra Leone, Ghana, Ethiopia and Zambia.

== Programmes ==
=== Rwanda ===
VFAN registered as a non-governmental organisation in Rwanda in 2011 and launched a national programme in partnership with Rwanda's Ministry of Health in 2012. VFAN successfully supported the Rwandan health ministry to deliver the world's first national eye care provision programme to Rwanda's population of 12 million across 15,000 villages. The programme built locally accessible eye care services across Rwanda through the country's network of 502 health centres. VFAN trained 2,797 nurses and screened two million people in the first two years. The programme dispensed 1.3 million prescriptions for eye medication, provided over 186,000 pairs of glasses and referred 250,000 people for specialist treatment.

By 2018, the service was fully integrated into Rwanda's public health system.

=== Ghana ===
In 2015, Vision for a Nation Foundation partnered with the Brien Holden Vision Institute to conduct a feasibility assessment in Ghana. The research assessed the potential for developing primary eye care services in the West African nation and involved consultations with Ghana's Ministry of Health.

VFAN then expanded operations in Ghana – Central and Upper East Regions – in 2019. From 2019-2022, VFAN trained 359 nurses and provided over 67,000 vision assessments in Ghana.

== Funding ==
Vision for a Nation Foundation's Rwanda programme was funded by UBS Optimus Foundation, the United States Agency for International Development (USAID), the United Kingdom's Department for International Development (DFID) and the Chen Yet-Sen Family Foundation.

The Ghana programme was supported with further funding from James Chen alongside grants from USAID, UBS Optimus Foundation and Medicor Foundation.

== Awards ==
- 2016 – Winner: "International Aid and Development", Civil Society Charity Awards
- 2016 – Winner: "Rising Chief Executive", Third Sector Excellence Awards
- 2016 – Finalist: "Big Impact", Third Sector Excellence Awards
- 2016 – Finalist: "Small Charity, Big Achiever", Third Sector Excellence Awards

== See also ==
- World Sight Day
