= Maggie Ford =

British writer (1928–2020)

Ivy Lord
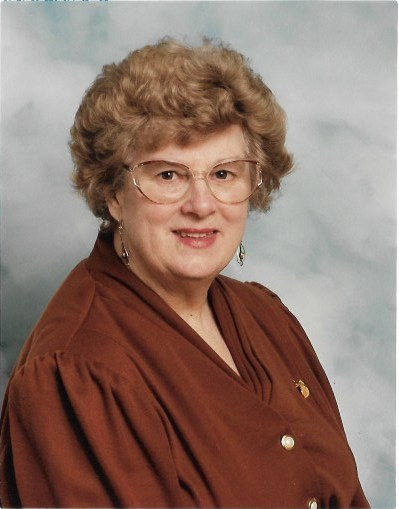
- Lord in August 1996
- Born: Ivy May Lord; 22 May 1928; London, England, United Kingdom
- Died: 29 May 2020 (aged 92)
- Occupations: Secretary, novelist
- Spouse(s): Mr John Mackney (deceased), Mr. Charles Titchen (deceased)
- Writing career
- Pen name: Elizabeth Lord, Maggie Ford
- Period: 1975–2017
- Genre: Romantic novel

Maggie Ford, also known as Elizabeth Lord (born 1928) was a British writer.

== Early life and family ==
Maggie Ford was born Ivy May Lord in London, England in 1928. She became interested in writing when she retired from her full time job and wrote her first novel at the age of sixty six.

Her first husband died in 1954, from a tragic accident at work. She re-married and then started a nursery / garden centre with her second husband.

== Career ==
Her writing career started when she wrote an article for Weekend magazine about a robbery that happened when she was at home with her daughter.

In the 1970s, she started writing romantic stories for various magazines.

In 1994, she published her first novel, Stolen Years.

Her first historical romantic work Company of Rebels, published in 2004, has sold in the United Kingdom and the United States.

In 2006, her next romantic fiction novel, Give Me Tomorrow, was published. Later, Publishers Weekly reviewed the novel.

In 2013, her novel, The Soldier's Bride, was published which was later reviewed by Burnley Express.

In 2014, her novel, Call Nurse Jenny, was published. The novel was reviewed by Blackpool Gazette.

During her writing career, she was a member of Brentwood Writers' Circle, Billericay Arts Group as well as the Romanic Novelist Association.

== Bibliography ==
- Lord, Elizabeth (1994). Stolen Years
- Lord, Elizabeth (1995). The Angry Heart
- Lord, Elizabeth (1996). A Better Life
- Lord, Elizabeth (1997). The Turning Tides
- Lord, Elizabeth (1998). For All the Bright Promise
- Lord, Elizabeth (1999). The Bowmaker Girls
- Lord, Elizabeth (2000). Mile End Girl
- Lord, Elizabeth (2001). Brenda's Place
- Lord, Elizabeth (2001). Butterfly Summers
- Lord, Elizabeth. Shadow's of Honour
- Lord, Elizabeth (2002). From Bow to Bond Street
- Lord, Elizabeth (2002). Autumn Skies
- Lord, Elizabeth (2002). Shadow of the Protector
- Lord, Elizabeth (2002). Fortunes Daughter
- Lord, Elizabeth (2004). Company of Rebels
- Lord, Elizabeth (2004). The Flower Girl
- Lord, Elizabeth (2006). Give Me Tomorrow
- Lord, Elizabeth (2006). To Cast a Stone
- Lord, Elizabeth (2006). Winter Wine
- Lord, Elizabeth (2007). A Secret Inheritance
- Lord, Elizabeth (2009). Julia's Way
- Lord, Elizabeth (2010). All That We Are
- Lord, Elizabeth (2012). The Chandelier Ballroom
- Lord, Elizabeth (2013). Illusions of Happiness
- Ford, Maggie (2013). The Soldier's Bride
- Ford, Maggie (2014). A Mother's Love
- Ford, Maggie (2014). Call Nurse Jenny
- Ford, Maggie (2014). A Woman's Place
- Ford, Maggie (2015). The Factory Girl
- Ford, Maggie (2016). A Girl in Wartime
- Ford, Maggie (2016). A Soldier's Girl
- Ford, Maggie (2017). An East End Girl
- Ford, Maggie (2018). The Fisherman's Girl
- Ford, Maggie (2019). Rags to Riches
- Ford, Maggie (2020). The Rag and Bone Girl
- Ford, Maggie (2021). The Flower Girl
- Ford, Maggie (2021). A Brighter Tomorrow
- Ford, Maggie (2021). A Fall from Grace
- Ford, Maggie (2021). A New Dream
- Ford, Maggie (2021). One of the Family
- Ford, Maggie (2021). Affairs of the Heart
- Ford, Maggie (2021). Echoes of the Past
- Ford, Maggie (2022). Mile End Girl
- Ford, Maggie (2022). A New Dream
- Ford, Maggie (2022). A Brighter Tomorrow
- Ford, Maggie (2022). A Fall From Grace
