= Eileen O'Brien (actress) =

English actress

Eileen O'Brien is an English actress who has played a wide variety of roles in British television over many years. She appeared in the ITV soap opera Emmerdale as Beattie Dixon in 2013, having previously appeared in the show as teacher Bridget Burgess from 2006 to 2007.

== Career ==
From 1987 to 1988, O'Brien had a recurring role in the BBC soap opera EastEnders; she played Edie Smith, the mother of Mary Smith (Linda Davidson).

O'Brien has also appeared in The Crezz, Casualty, Doctors, The Royal, Where the Heart Is, Brookside, Heartbeat and Coronation Street. She later appeared in several films, including Between Two Women in 2000. In May 2009, she played Anne in the BBC miniseries Moving On. In 2013, she played Rita in the BBC comedy-drama Being Eileen. In January 2020, she appeared in an episode of the BBC soap opera Doctors as Jean Wadham.
