= Lofty Holloway =

Fictional character from EastEnders

- EastEnders character
- Portrayed by: Tom Watt
- Duration: 1985–1988, 2019, 2022
- First appearance: Episode 3; 26 February 1985
- Last appearance: Episode 6608; 12 December 2022
- Created by: Tony Holland and Julia Smith
- Introduced by: Julia Smith (1985); John Yorke (2019); Chris Clenshaw (2022)
- Book appearances: Hopes and Horizons; A Place in Life
In-universe information
- Other names: George Holloway
- Occupation: Soldier; Barman; Youth worker; Handyman; Social worker; Businessman
- Wife: Michelle Fowler (1986–1988)
- Stepdaughters: Vicki Fowler
- Aunts: Irene

Lofty Holloway is a fictional character from the BBC soap opera EastEnders, played by Tom Watt. Lofty is one of the serial's original characters, making his first appearance in the third episode, which was first broadcast on 26 February 1985. Lofty is generally depicted as a meek, luckless, hapless victim. A long-running storyline concerns his relationship with the character Michelle Fowler (Susan Tully). Lofty departed in episode 334, first broadcast on 19 April 1988. Watt reprised his role in 2019 for the funeral of Harold Legg (Leonard Fenton). Lofty appears in episode 5871, originally broadcast on 19 February 2019. He reprised the role again in 2022 for the funeral of Dot Cotton (June Brown); Lofty appears in episode 6608, first broadcast on 12 December 2022.

== Creation ==
Lofty is one of the original 23 characters invented by the creators of EastEnders, Tony Holland and Julia Smith, who felt that to help complete the community there was a need for a character in his early twenties. He had to be someone a bit different; not brash and confident like a lot of the older men, and not boisterous like the younger ones. A loner, maybe someone forced to be a loner. A person who "stuck out like a sore thumb". Someone who was happiest in a group but still couldn't find one that he fitted in with. Tony Holland had previously been in the army and found that ex-soldiers had these problems when they tried to reintegrate as civilians. So they decided that Lofty would be an ex-soldier, forced to quit because of his asthma. He was happiest in the army and felt incomplete without the group setting, the all-male camaraderie and even the security of the uniformity that the army provides.

Lofty's original character outline as written by Smith and Holland appeared in an abridged form in their book, EastEnders: The Inside Story.

"Born of a working-class London family, which was very respectable: Church of England and ex-army...Lofty grew up in a house where his father was only really happy when reminiscing about his army days and his mother was ultra-possessive and narrow minded...His friends were always vetted...He grew up to despise his mother and have a tolerant pity for his father...His best moments came in the Boy Scouts, the summer camp, and the feeling of belonging...On his eighteenth birthday, he walked into an army careers office and from then until the age of twenty-one had the happiest years of his life in the RASC...He adored the army – It gave him a uniform, and set the limits...Then the shock – he was discovered to be physically unfit...Dormant asthma...He was invalided out of the service...And, he had no taste for civilian life...His Auntie Irene (now in a hospice) secured the flat above Ethel Skinner's for Lofty...He misses the security of the Army...He works in the pub – cash in hand." (page 60)

The invention of Lofty had been an afterthought, and during the casting he was still considered as something of an "enigma" to the creators and writers alike. This had made casting difficult as Holland and Smith were unsure about what they were looking for. The actor Tom Watt was suggested by one of the writers. Holland and Smith liked that his physical appearance (gauche and childlike) made him stand out (they likened him to the accident-prone sitcom character, Frank Spencer). It was decided that these attributes fitted the character perfectly and Watt was subsequently cast in the role.

== Development ==
The BBC's official EastEnders website describes Lofty as "a mug although a lovable one". In 1987, Bob Shields of the Evening Times described Lofty as a "portable funeral". He added, "Beneath the facade of his National Health glasses smoulders the fire and passion of a cold toilet seat."

One of the most notable storylines Lofty was involved with was his marriage to teenage mother Michelle Fowler (Susan Tully). Michelle and Lofty's church wedding was a massive target of press speculation before the episodes aired. They wanted to know two things, firstly the design of Michelle's dress, and secondly whether or not she would jilt Lofty at the altar.

Anticipating a press furore, it was decided to shoot the wedding in a church in private grounds where journalists would not have access. However the press still turned up in large numbers, and security men had to be hired to keep photographers away from the story action. Huge lorries were parked in front of the entrance to the church so that nothing could be seen, and the cast arrived in disguise. Finally strong lights were shone into the eyes of the journalists and photographers, making them extremely angry, and they constantly tried to gain access to the grounds by breaking the security barrier and telling the production team that they were really extras needed inside the church.

The episode was written by David Ashton, and was devoted to Lofty and Michelle's wedding day. At the time it was deemed as one of the best cliffhangers of the series, with the episode ending as the bride arrives at the church door and hesitates. Michelle and Lofty's eventual marriage helped to consolidate a fast-growing audience. The young couple had come together under enormously difficult circumstances. The subsequent storylines were purposefully built to keep the audience guessing about the future of their relationship. Were they married for the wrong reasons? Would the relationship survive? and what would happen if Lofty wanted a child that was their own?

The character remained in the show for three years, and eventually departed in 1988 when Watt decided to move on. On screen, Lofty, heart-broken after Michelle's abortion, moves on to become a handyman in a children's home.

In 2009, when asked if there was a chance he would return as Lofty, Watt told Patrick McLennan of What's on TV: "I get the feeling that people think I'm ashamed of EastEnders; like it's some dirty thing in my past. But I had a fantastic time on that show and Lofty was loved by nobody more than the person who played him. I cannot think of anybody who had a better character to play. But I haven't been beating a path to their door, they haven't been beating a path to mine."

The BBC confirmed that Watt would reprise his role as Lofty, alongside Linda Davidson as Mary Smith, over 30 years after they departed, on 18 December. The characters returned for the funeral of original character Doctor Legg (Leonard Fenton), who returned to the soap in 2018. Lofty appears in one episode broadcast in 2019. Executive consultant John Yorke invited Watt to reprise the role and described Lofty as a "hugely iconic character, and a central part of the show's DNA". He added that he was excited to have the characters return for one episode. Watt was pleased to be invited back to the soap and thought that it was "fitting" that Lofty returns for Doctor Legg's funeral. He commented, "I have nothing but good memories from my time on EastEnders so it will be lovely to set foot back in Albert Square all these years later."

Speaking to the Metro about his return to filming, Watt said: 'We saw Letitia [Dean], Gill [Taylforth], June [Brown], Len [Fenton], some of the market stall holders are still the same people. You sort of pick up where you left off. You just start taking the piss again. We did have a laugh. 'It was that kind of an introduction back into the story, although Letitia is fantastic. We just have a couple of little scenes. When John [Yorke, producer] explained it, I thought 'that sounds really good' and then the script came through and "yeah still sounds really good."'

== Storylines ==
=== 1985–1988 ===
George Holloway, nicknamed "Lofty" for his above-average height, serves in the Army but must leave because he suffers from chronic asthma; he settles in Walford and gets a job as a barman at The Queen Victoria public house.

Lofty is devoted to his aunt Irene (Katherine Parr), who lives in a hospice, stricken with inoperable cancer. He takes on the task of looking after and visiting her and is devastated when she eventually dies in 1987. He grows close to Michelle Fowler (Susan Tully) after she becomes pregnant in 1985 and refuses to name the father: Lofty's employer, Den Watts (Leslie Grantham), is the actual father although Lofty never discovers this. Michelle finds the prospect of bringing up a child daunting. Lofty struggles to see Michelle unhappy and chivalrously offers to marry her and help bring up her baby, Vicki, as his own. Although Michelle does not love Lofty, she accepts his proposal, realising that she can never be with her baby's real father. However, on their wedding day, Michelle is visited by Den in secret, which makes her reconsider her options; she jilts Lofty at the altar, devastating him.

When Michelle changes her mind months later, Lofty is overjoyed and sneaks Michelle away for a secret wedding. Money is sparse for the couple and Michelle is never truly happy; she quickly tires of Lofty. When Lofty begins pressuring Michelle to have a baby with him and to allow him to adopt Vicki, she is unwilling. She discovers that she is pregnant with Lofty's child and has an abortion. Lofty is devastated by Michelle's betrayal and their marriage breaks down. He grows depressed about losing the child he wanted so badly and amidst continued hostility with Michelle, he leaves Walford and take a job working as a handyman in a children's home in Bedfordshire, leaving in April 1988 with only Den witnessing his departure. It is subsequently revealed that Lofty has become a social worker.

=== 2019–2022 ===
Over thirty years later in 2019, Lofty returns for the funeral of Dr. Harold Legg (Leonard Fenton), where he reunites with old friends, Dot Branning (June Brown), Mary Smith (Linda Davidson), Sharon Mitchell (Letitia Dean), and Kathy Beale (Gillian Taylforth), and explains that he now owns 15 pubs across London. They reminisce and before leaving, Lofty hands Michelle's brother, Martin Fowler (James Bye), a cheque for £20,000 to be given to Vicki. Lofty returns again three years later, in 2022, for Dot's funeral. He arrives late after initially going to the wrong church.

== Reception ==
In 1988, actor Kevin Kennedy who played Curly Watts in the ITV soap opera Coronation Street, which was EastEnders' biggest television rival, criticised the character of Lofty. Kennedy claimed that Lofty was a direct copy of his character Curly: "As far as I'm concerned, Lofty was a straight lift. It really annoyed me when I saw it. Lofty even had the same hairstyle and glasses as Curly, he had the same caring but dithering nature. It was a perfect copy." Curly first appeared in Coronation Street in 1983, just under two years before Lofty first appeared in EastEnders in 1985.

Steve Tooze of the Daily Mirror branded the character a "daft, clueless geek who married 'Chelle Fowler, even though she was pregnant with Dirty Den's baby, and was duly dumped for his kind-heartedness." In 2020, Tooze's colleagues, Sara Wallis and Ian Hyland, placed Lofty 76th on their ranked list of the best EastEnders characters of all time and wrote that he was "cruelly betrayed" by Michelle. In 2022, Luke Weir from Surrey Live called Lofty a "loveable" and "luckless" whose storyline with Michelle got "viewers to root for him".
