= Tom Watt (actor) =

English actor and broadcaster (born 1956)

- Born: Thomas Erickson Watt; 14 February 1956 (age 70); Wanstead, Essex, England
- Occupations: Actor; writer; broadcaster
- Years active: 1981–present
- Known for: EastEnders (1985–1988, 2019, 2022)
- Children: 1

Thomas Erickson Watt (born 14 February 1956) is an English actor, writer and broadcaster, known for playing Lofty Holloway in the BBC One soap opera EastEnders. He is also known for his appearances on the BBC radio show Fighting Talk and his documentary films for BT Sport.

== Career ==
=== Acting ===
Born in Wanstead, Watt studied drama at the University of Manchester where he directed several stage productions. One of his first television roles was in the comedy series Never the Twain in 1981, but his big break came in 1985 when he was cast as one of the original characters in the BBC One soap opera, EastEnders. Watt played Lofty Holloway, the barman of the Queen Vic pub, from the show's inception until 1988.

Other acting credits include roles in the BBC drama South of the Border, a South London detective show; the role of Norman in the 1990 film for ITV called And the Nightingale Sang, a love story set during the war; Boon 1992, with Michael Elphick; as well as a minor role in the 1992 film Patriot Games.

As well as television and film he has had many theatre and stage roles. Most notably, he starred in the one-man show Fever Pitch, based on the Nick Hornby novel of the same name. Watt appeared in an episode of the BBC TV series New Tricks, had a minor role in Guy Ritchie's Sherlock Holmes and appeared in a production of Madness in Valencia.

In 2019 and 2022, Watt reprised his role as Lofty Holloway in EastEnders for two episodes, for the funerals of Dr. Harold Legg and Dot Cotton.

=== Television and radio ===
After leaving EastEnders, Watt began presenting sports segments for Channel 4, Radio 1, Radio 3, Radio 5 Live, Talksport, and Cable TV. He has also written, presented and produced several documentaries about football for BT Sport Films, including the Football Outposts series. Watt featured regularly on BBC Radio 5 Live's Fighting Talk, where he won the Champion of Champions trophy on 28 May 2011. He hosted Arsenal TV's Monday night Fans' Forum until the show was discontinued. He also produced, directed and presented the Channel 4 children's sports show, Rookies in the early 1990s.

=== Music ===
Watt recorded a cover version of Bob Dylan's 1965 song "Subterranean Homesick Blues" in 1985, with members of the English rock band New Order among other artists appearing in the music video. The single peaked at number 67 in the UK singles chart.

=== Writing ===
Watt wrote match reports and features for The Observer for several years. He has written nine books about football, including The End, A Passion for the Game, A Beautiful Game and the legacy book for the 2010 World Cup in South Africa. He was the ghost-writer for the David Beckham autobiography, My Side, which won a special prize at the British Book Awards. In 2017, Watt wrote 13 Years In Heaven with Thomas Salme.

== Personal life ==
Watt was once romantically involved with his EastEnders castmate Anita Dobson, who played Angie Watts. He married his wife in 1993 and they have since had a son, Roland.

Watt is currently an advisory board member for BounceBack, a charity that trains ex offenders.

== Filmography ==
=== Film ===
Year	Title	Role	Notes
1992	Patriot Games	The Electrician	
2000	Saint Jude	Pat	
2005	Lost Dogs	Dennis Balch	
2006	Flirting with Flamenco	Martin	
2009	Sherlock Holmes	Carriage Driver	
2016	The Cucaracha Club	Cameron Carrington	

=== Television ===
Year	Title	Role	Notes
1981	My Father's House	Eddie	2 episodes
1982	A Kind of Loving	Wally Chisholm	2 episodes
1983	Chessgame	Technician	1 episode
1984	Love and Marriage	Paul	1 episode
1984	The Adventures of Sherlock Holmes: A Scandal in Bohemia	1st Loafer	1 episode
1984	Dramarama	Steve Berwick	1 episode
1984	Never the Twain	Duane	1 episode
1985–1988, 2019, 2022	EastEnders	Lofty Holloway	Series regular, 256 episodes
1986	Cold War Killers	Technician	Television film
1989	And a Nightingale Sang	Norman	Television film
1992	Boon	Steve	1 episode
1993	Comedy Playhouse	Gordon	1 episode
1994–1995	Space Precinct	Officer Beezle	4 episodes
2000	Happy Birthday Shakespeare	Mickey	Television film
2002	TLC	Sid	1 episode
2009	Doctors	Ray MacGyver	1 episode
2010	New Tricks	Stuart Russell	1 episode
