= 2000 in British television =

This is a list of British television related events from 2000.

== Events ==
=== January ===
- 1 January
  - 2000 Today, the marathon 28-hour live broadcast to celebrate the dawn of the new millennium shown on BBC One, ends at 1:30pm.
  - Launch of Castaway 2000 on BBC One, a reality television show billed as a bold experiment for the new millennium. Thirty-six men, women and children from the British public are placed on Taransay for a year. Taransay is a remote Scottish island in the Outer Hebrides and the group must build a sustainable self-sufficient community. The programme ends on New Year's Day 2001.
  - Channel 4 airs The Biggest Breakfast Ever, an eight-hour overnight millennium special with Johnny Vaughan and Liza Tarbuck. The channel's New Year's Day schedule also includes a contemporary version of Cinderella starring Kathleen Turner.
  - ITV airs the final episode of Gladiators; the ending is dedicated to LWT videotape editor Clayton Parker who died in a car accident at the age of 45 in February 1999. The show is later revived by Sky One in 2008, and then again by the BBC in 2024.
- 2 January
  - Provisional viewing figures suggest BBC One's millennium coverage was watched by 12.8 million viewers as the New Year was welcomed in at midnight, more than twice the usual audience for New Year television. ITV's coverage was seen by 4.1 million.
  - BBC One airs a millennium special of its garden makeover series Ground Force in which Alan Titchmarsh, Charlie Dimmock and Tommy Walsh travel to the South African village of Qunu to design and build a garden for the former President Nelson Mandela.
  - Sarah Lancashire returns to Coronation Street as Raquel Watts for a special one-off episode in which she is reunited with husband Curly (Kevin Kennedy). The episode is watched by an average of 17.5 million viewers, peaking at 18.6 million.
- 3 January
  - The highest rated UK programme of the year so far is recorded, an episode of Coronation Street that gets 18.96 million viewers.
  - The hugely popular and long-running US animated series SpongeBob SquarePants makes its UK debut on Nickelodeon, eight months after it first aired in the US.
- 6 January – Following a brief return to the series during 1999, Gillian Taylforth leaves her EastEnders role as Kathy Beale.
- 7 January
  - The long-running BBC children's programme Blue Peter reunites two former presenting teams to dig up the time capsules they buried for the year 2000 in 1971 and 1984.
  - A brand new stop-motion animated series for preschoolers Yoho Ahoy is first broadcast on BBC One.
  - ITV begins airing a new series of Catchphrase, in which Nick Weir takes over as presenter as part of a major revamp of the programme.
  - The Buffy the Vampire Slayer spin-off series Angel makes its UK debut on Sky One.
- 10 January – The US political drama The West Wing makes its UK debut on Sky One.
- 11 January – The US crime drama Third Watch makes its UK debut on Sky One.
- 12 January
  - A police officer charged over the crash that left television presenter Sheena McDonald in hospital is acquitted following a hearing at Horseferry Road Magistrates' Court.
  - Debut of the reality series Shipwrecked on Channel 4.
- 14 January – Debut of the hidden camera/practical jokes series Trigger Happy TV on Channel 4, starring Dom Joly.
- 17 January – BBC Two begins airing a four-part adaptation of Gormenghast, Mervyn Peake's series of fantasy novels. The series, starring Jonathan Rhys Meyers is launched with a massive publicity campaign, but is panned by critics and loses 40% of its viewership by the third episode. Figures indicate that the first episode is watched by 4.2 million, a healthy audience for a BBC Two programme, but that by the third episode, aired on 31 January, falls to 2.5 million.
- 18 January
  - ITV sports commentator Steve Smith is reprimanded by the Independent Television Commission for calling a French rugby player a "stroppy little frog" after he throws the ball at an opponent during a World Cup match between France and Fiji in October 1999.
  - Retired Naval Officer Peter Lee becomes the biggest winner to date on ITV's Who Wants to Be a Millionaire? after winning £500,000. He is also the first person to have the opportunity to answer the £1 million question which concerns the location of Durham County Cricket Club, but he takes the money after being unsure of the answer. The show would have its first £1 million winner in November.
  - The BBC confirms that Danniella Westbrook will leave EastEnders for the second time in four years, her character, Sam Mitchell having returned to the series only in 1999.
- 19 January – Former Brookside actress Gabrielle Glaister is to join Coronation Street where she will play Debs Brownlow, the younger sister of Natalie Barnes (Denise Welch).
- 20 January – Debut of the comedy-drama series At Home with the Braithwaites on ITV.
- 21 January – Debut of the documentary series The Unforgettable on ITV.
- 23 January
  - Helen Flanagan takes over the role of Coronation Street character Rosie Webster from Emma Collinge who has played Rosie since she was ten days old. Collinge is leaving the series to devote more time to gymnastics.
  - Debut of the drama series Clocking Off on BBC One.
- 25 January – Fiona Bruce presents her first episode of Crimewatch on BBC One alongside Nick Ross, following the murder of her predecessor Jill Dando in April last year.
- 27 January
  - Channel 4's The 11 O'Clock Show is criticised by the Broadcasting Standards Commission for including a reference to murdered television presenter Jill Dando which would have caused "widespread public offence". Channel 4 says that the item which aired on 26 October 1999, was meant to be a criticism of the high cost of the murder investigation and the ratings war between BBC One and ITV.
  - BBC One airs the final episode of Dinnerladies.
- 31 January – Carlton Kids ceases broadcasting after 14 months on the air.

=== February ===
- 1 February
  - Greg Dyke takes over as Director-General of the BBC.
  - Carlton World ceases broadcasting after 14 months on the air.
  - Discovery Wings and Discovery Kids launch. They are created for the OnDigital platform as replacements for the two Carlton channels. Discovery Kids broadcasts during the day with Wings taking over for the evening. The two channels are initially exclusive to OnDigital but later launch on other platforms.
- 3 February – Joe Absolom makes his final EastEnders appearance in a dramatic storyline that sees his character, Matthew Rose get his revenge against Steve Owen after Rose was wrongly convicted of the manslaughter of Owen's girlfriend.
- 4 February – Debut of the sitcom My Hero on BBC One.
- 5 February – An episode of Casualty in which the character Amy Howard (played by Rebecca Wheatley) is persuaded to attend a singing audition. The song she performs, Stay with Me Baby is subsequently released as a single by Wheatley who had been a singer prior to her acting career.
- 7 February – Director-General of the BBC Greg Dyke launches his "Cut the Crap" initiative, a drive to cut red tape at the BBC. Staff are issued with yellow cards bearing the phrase "Cut the crap, make it happen" which they are encouraged to brandish at meetings if they feel inertia is getting in the way of creativity.
- 10 February – Coronation Street confirms that Jane Danson who plays Leanne Battersby will leave the soap later in the year.
- 11 February – Debut of the romantic drama Reach for the Moon on ITV, starring Lynda Bellingham.
- 12 February – BBC One airs When Changing Rooms Met Ground Force, a crossover edition of its two popular design and makeover shows, Changing Rooms and Ground Force.
- 13 February – BBC Two airs Gimme Some Truth, a documentary featuring footage of John Lennon as he recorded his 1971 album Imagine.
- 15 February – BBC One airs a one-off quiz, A Question of EastEnders to celebrate the soap's 15th anniversary.
- 18 February – Kevin Pallister leaves Emmerdale as Graham Clark.
- 19 February – EastEnders celebrates its 15th anniversary on BBC One.
- 22 February – The final episode of Queer as Folk is broadcast on Channel 4.
- 23 February
  - The children's drama Hero to Zero makes its debut on BBC One.
  - The documentary series Child of Our Time makes its debut on BBC One. Presented by Robert Winston and co-produced with the Open University, the programme follows the lives of 25 children born at the start of 2000. It would run for 20 years until 2020.
- 24 February – The Guardian reports that the Australian soap Home and Away will move from ITV to Channel 5 after the latter paid £40 million for the broadcast rights. It is the first time the channel has poached a programme from its rival.
- 27 February – BBC One airs the first episode of Monarch of the Glen.
- 28 February – Having decided not to adopt the 1999 ITV generic look, Scottish and Grampian launch a new on-screen logo.
- February – Menna Richards becomes Controller of BBC Cymru Wales.

=== March ===
- 1 March – Carlton Select closes, with Carlton's two other channels, Carlton Cinema and Carlton Food Network expanding their broadcasting hours in the wake Carlton Select's demise.
- 2 March – The axe falls on some EastEnders characters, including Ricky Butcher.
- 4 March – ITV airs The Brit Awards 2000, hosted by Davina McCall.
- 5 March – Former Take That singer Gary Barlow makes his acting debut in the 150th episode of Heartbeat on ITV, playing a hitchhiker named Mike Shannon.
- 7 March – Coronation Street confirms that television presenter Naomi Russell will join the series to play factory worker Bobbi Lewis.
- 11 March – ITV airs The Lookalikes Agency.
- 12 March – ITV airs the drama Hero of the Hour, starring Ross Kemp.
- 13 March
  - Debut of The Blind Date, a two-part ITV drama starring Zara Turner.
  - Debut of the long-running daytime series Bargain Hunt on BBC One.
- 15 March – ITV will scrap its afternoon showing of Home and Away from 27 March after losing the soap to Channel 5, but it will continue to air in the early evening slot.
- 16 March – The Britt Allcroft Company best known for producing the first five series of Thomas the Tank Engine & Friends acquires the rights to the long-running children's arts and crafts programme Art Attack and other works from The Media Merchants company run by the host of the series Neil Buchanan and Tim Edmunds.
- 17 March
  - To mark the re-release of Stanley Kubrick's 1971 film A Clockwork Orange, FilmFour airs Return of A Clockwork Orange, a documentary discussing the controversy surrounding the film. It is also shown the following day on Channel 4.
  - ITV airs an episode of Catchphrase in which presenter Nick Weir falls down the stairs whilst running on to introduce the show and breaks his left foot.
- 19 March – Debut of Seeing Red, an ITV drama based on the book of the same name by Coral Atkins and starring Sarah Lancashire and Richard Dillane.
- 21 March – The network television premiere of Metro on Channel 5, starring Eddie Murphy.
- 22 March – The House of Commons Culture, Media and Sport Committee issues a report calling on ITV to restore News at Ten after finding that the broadcaster has seen a drop in ratings since the programme was dropped in 1999.
- 24 March – Paul Loughran leaves Emmerdale after six years when his character Butch Dingle dies in a bus crash.
- 26 March – Debut of Doctors on BBC One. A new daily serial set in a doctors' surgery. The first episode is broadcast at 6:35pm on a Sunday evening, before continuing on weekdays at 12:30pm.
- 27 March – The BBC announces plans to establish an annual bursary at a college in Falmouth for students wishing to train in broadcast journalism as a "living tribute" to TV presenter Jill Dando.
- 28 March
  - In its annual report, the Independent Television Commission praises Channel 5 for reducing the number of "tacky" sex shows included in its scheduling, while 5 News and the channel's films and factual programming are also praised. However, the watchdog criticises the amount of low budget programming shown, particularly in the early hours of the morning. The ITC also has warm words for Channel 4, in particular for the "freshness and innovation" of its programming.
  - BBC Two's Spring and Summer season will see actor John Alford, jailed in 1999 for drug offences, make his return to television as a taxi passenger in a ten-minute short titled Talk Radio, it is reported. Other highlights include the comedy Coupling and Rhona, the first British sitcom about a lesbian.
- 29 March – The Broadcasting Standards Commission reprimands EastEnders for episodes screened in December 1999 that featured characters attending a stag and hen weekend in Amsterdam which showed drinking, drug taking and sexual innuendo. An episode of Goodness Gracious Me aired in February is also criticised for a sketch in which mango chutney was spread on communion bread, something that several viewers felt was disrespectful to the Eucharist.
- 30 March
  - UK Arena is renamed UK Drama.
  - Debut of Da Ali G Show on Channel 4.

=== April ===
- 3 April
  - BSkyB airs the first interactive TV advert for the cooking sauce Chicken Tonight. Viewers are offered the option of pushing the Red Button to visit Sky's interactive TV service Open where they can order a money-off voucher and a recipe book and to browse through recipes.
  - The British/French children's animated series 64 Zoo Lane makes its debut on BBC One.
- 6 April – Debut of L.A. 7, the second series starring the pop group S Club 7 on BBC One.
- 12 April – ITV airs the second Pride of Britain Awards which attracts an audience of 10.2 million. The figures prove to be a surprise for the broadcaster and are higher than those achieved by the 2000 BRIT Awards which had 8.8 million viewers and the BAFTA Awards that aired on Sky One which had a viewership of 100,000.
- 14 April – Former MI5 Officer David Shayler who fled from the UK after passing secret documents to the Mail on Sunday, appears as a guest on Have I Got News for You. Because he faces arrest if he returns to the UK, his contribution is recorded via satellite from a studio in France which affected the timing of the comedy on that edition.
- 15 April – Steve Wilson and Emma Ledden present their final edition of Live & Kicking on BBC One.
- 17 April
  - A former researcher on The Vanessa Show wins libel damages against The Mirror newspaper after it published an article in February 1999 claiming she knew many of the guests she had hired for the show were fakes.
  - The shopping channel Ideal World is launched.
- 20 April – After twelve years as Ricky Butcher, Sid Owen makes his final appearance in EastEnders where his character is seen leaving for Europe in a lorry.
- 27 April – Debut of the comedy sketch show The Big Impression on BBC One, starring Alistair McGowan.
- 28 April – Channel 4 confirms that Liza Tarbuck will leave The Big Breakfast to return to acting after the presenter broke the news on the programme's website. She will leave in August at the end of her year-long contract.
- 30 April – Guinness's 1999 Surfer advertisement is voted No. 1 in a poll of the top 100 greatest television adverts of all time in a show for Channel 4.

=== May ===
- 1 May
  - ITV's Day of Promise, a series of special programmes throughout the day hosted by Eamonn Holmes, Carol Vorderman and Danielle Nicholls. The day is part of a 12-month campaign in which people around Britain are asked to make a simple pledge to do something positive for the first year of the new millennium. Among the programmes aired that day include the first celebrity edition of Who Wants to Be a Millionaire?.
  - Formal broadcasting of pay-per-view (PPV) service ONrequest begins.
- 4 May – Coronation Street confirms that Charles Lawson who plays Jim McDonald, is to be written out of the series when his contract ends in October.
- 9 May – Durham University wins the 1999–2000 series of University Challenge, beating Oriel College, Oxford 325–135.
- 13 May
  - Four senior television figures, Alastair Burnet, David Nicholas, Geoffrey Cox and Nigel Ryan have written to the Independent Television Commission accusing ITV of ruining its reputation by replacing News at Ten with "weak series, entertainment trivia and mildly pornographic programmes", it is reported.
  - Denmark's Olsen Brothers win the 2000 Eurovision Song Contest with Fly on the Wings of Love.
- 16 May – The final episode of the long-running children's series Rosie and Jim is broadcast on ITV.
- 17 May – The completion of NTL's purchase of Cable & Wireless’ cable assets takes place. two months after the sale was cleared by the Competition Commission.
- 18 May – The Independent Television Commission rejects proposals by ITV to improve promotion of its news bulletins and increase spending on evening programming. The broadcaster's nightly news bulletin has suffered a drop in ratings since News at Ten was axed last year.
- 20 May – Gary Mullen, performing as Freddie Mercury wins the eleventh series of Stars in Their Eyes on ITV, achieving the highest number of votes for a series winner with over 850,000.
- 22 May – Following a hearing at Inner London Crown Court, former Changing Rooms designer Liz Wagstaff is sentenced to twelve months imprisonment for deceiving friends and colleagues out of £54,000 by claiming she needed the money for specialist cancer treatment.
- 24 May – BBC Two airs a special edition of TOTP2 featuring performances from Bon Jovi.
- 28 May – Debut of the talk show Baddiel and Skinner Unplanned on ITV, presented by David Baddiel and Frank Skinner.
- 30 May
  - Six cast members of ITV's The Bill are to leave the series, it is reported. They include Peter Ellis who plays Chief Superintendent Brownlow and Billy Murray who plays Detective Sergeant Don Beech.
  - The final episode of Ready Steady Cook presented by Fern Britton is broadcast on BBC Two.
  - The first edition of Liquid News is broadcast on BBC Choice.
- May
  - The licence to run Channel 5's teletext service is awarded to Teletext Ltd and is valid for ten years from 1 July 2002.
  - The BBC announces that Ainsley Harriott will succeed Fern Britton as the presenter of Ready Steady Cook.

=== June ===
- 2 June – Johnny Vaughan confirms he will step down as co-presenter of The Big Breakfast in early 2001.
- 4 June
  - 13-year-old Coronation Street character Sarah Platt (played by Tina O'Brien) gives birth to a baby daughter called Bethany, a storyline which intensifies a national public and media frenzy surrounding the topic of teenage pregnancy.
  - Marjorie Lang wins the 2000 series of MasterChef.
- 6 June – Channel 5 airs the one-off game show Naked Jungle as part of its Naturism Week. The show features presenter Keith Chegwin and contestants completing a number of puzzle-type tasks in a jungle environment. The programme sparks a debate about nudity on television and is mentioned in the House of Commons where Culture Secretary Chris Smith questions the quality of British television content.
- 8 June – After 11 years, Home and Away is shown on ITV for the final time. It returns on Channel 5 on 16 July 2001. The show's year-long absence occurs because of a clause in ITV's contract preventing it from being broadcast for at least a year after its ITV run ends.
- 10 June−2 July – Euro 2000 is held jointly by Belgium and the Netherlands with live coverage broadcast on the BBC and ITV.
- 14 June – Sky Sports retains the rights to broadcast live FA Premiership football until 2004. The £1.1 billion deal allows the broadcaster to show 66 matches per season and an additional 40 matches per season on a new pay-per-view service in partnership with cable platform NTL. On the same day, ITV secures the rights to league highlights for the same three-year period.
- 15 June
  - Patsy Palmer makes her post-EastEnders debut in one-off detective drama McCready and Daughter, while former Coronation Street actress Sarah Lancashire stars in the legal sitcom Chambers.
  - BBC Two airs a special edition of TOTP2 dedicated to ABBA.
  - The BBC secures a three-year deal for free-to-air rights to The FA Cup and England international matches beginning from the 2001–02 season.
- 16 June – ONdigital outbids BSkyB for rights to the Nationwide Football League and the Worthington Cup from the 2001–02 season. The three-season deal is worth £315 million, more than five times the amount of the existing contract with BSkyB.
- 20 June – A failure at a substation in Shepherd's Bush causes a power cut at BBC Television Centre and leads to major disruption to BBC television and radio services, though its live coverage of England's decisive final group stage match against Romania at Euro 2000 is largely unaffected.
- 23 June – Chris Evans presents his final edition of TFI Friday on Channel 4. The show would return in November for its final series with various guest presenters.
- 28 June – The Broadcasting Standards Commission upholds twelve viewer complaints about the London Weekend Television documentary Aircraft Emergencies which showed slow motion footage of air crashes against the backdrop of dramatic music. The Commission felt the programme was too voyeuristic and would have added to the distress of those involved in the incidents.
- 29 June – It is announced that Lisa Riley will leave her role as Emmerdale's Mandy Dingle in the Autumn.

=== July ===
- 1 July – C-Day in the United Kingdom. From that day, most commercial broadcasters begin broadcasting adverts, promotions, and idents in 16:9 widescreen ratio.
- 3 July – ITV announces that Emmerdale will air five nights a week from the Autumn.
- 6 July – The first episode of the new police procedural drama Burnside is broadcast on ITV.
- 7 July – The final episode of the cookery series Can't Cook, Won't Cook is broadcast on BBC One.
- 11 July – Eric Richard who plays the long-serving Sergeant Bob Cryer in The Bill is to leave the series, it is reported.
- 14 July – The hugely popular reality show Big Brother makes its debut on Channel 4, presented by Davina McCall.
- 17 July – ITV launches a £500,000 advertising campaign fronted by Jerry Springer which was aimed at repositioning ITV2 as a general entertainment channel. When it launched in December 1998, the channel had promoted itself as a younger alternative to ITV.
- 20 July – The Independent Television Commission says it will issue a "legally binding" directive to ITV to move its 11pm news bulletin forward an hour if it does not restore News at Ten. The ITC have been concerned about the 11pm bulletin's low ratings.
- 22 July – The ten part popular culture series I Love the '70s debuts on BBC Two with I Love 1970 where each edition was dedicated to a different year of the decade, the series concludes on 23 September with I Love 1979.
- 24 July – Debut of the children's series Xchange on BBC One.
- 27 July – ITV says it will apply for a High Court judicial review into the ITC's decision to order it to move its 11pm news bulletin.
- 28 July – BBC One introduces its daytime soap Doctors into the evening schedule with the first of seven weekly episodes planned to air in the Friday 7pm slot. The episodes are shown in that slot up to Friday 1 September, with the final episode of the run airing at 7:00pm on Thursday 7 September.

=== August ===
- 1 August – The ITN News Channel launches. It is a joint venture between ITN and NTL.
- 4 August – Liza Tarbuck presents her final edition of The Big Breakfast on Channel 4. Later that same day, it is confirmed that Denise van Outen will return to the show to co-host with Johnny Vaughan from 11 September until he leaves in early 2001.
- 6 August – The BBC are considering a reorganisation of their digital channels to replace BBC Choice and BBC Knowledge with BBC Three and BBC Four, it is reported. The new channels would launch in February 2003 and March 2002 respectively.
- 13 August – The first episode of the game show The People Versus is broadcast on ITV, presented by Kirsty Young. The game is unique in that the questions asked to the contestants are submitted by members of the public.
- 14 August
  - Debut of the hugely popular and long running game show The Weakest Link on BBC Two, presented by Anne Robinson.
  - The cookery series Ready Steady Cook is relaunched with a new format on BBC Two. Regular chef Ainsley Harriott replaces Fern Britton as host, although he already made his presenting debut on the Celebrity edition in June.
- 16 August – Sophie Long, an aspiring broadcast journalist from Weston-super-Mare is awarded the first Jill Dando bursary, it is reported. After later graduating from Falmouth College of Arts, she is taken on by the BBC.
- 17 August – Big Brother contestant Nick Bateman is evicted after attempting to influence voting on the reality show.
- 24 August – BBC Two announces its Autumn programme lineup. Leading the lineup are new drama Attachments and new comedies Human Remains (then known as Consenting Adults) and Two Pints of Lager and A Packet of Crisps, which doesn't actually debut until 2001.
- 25 August – Delivering the annual MacTaggart Lecture at the Edinburgh International Television Festival, BBC Director-General Greg Dyke announces plans to move the BBC Nine O'Clock News to 10pm, ending the bulletin's 30-year run in the 9pm time slot. The change would take place in October.
- 26 August – Ian Wright presents the pilot episode of This is My Moment, a singing talent show made by Granada Television. Members of the public were invited to call a premium-rate phoneline to audition for the show, 60 of whom were chosen to perform in front of a panel at Granada Studios. Of those, five were then selected to appear on the show. The public are encouraged to vote for their favourite act, with the number of calls determining the overall prize money.
- 28 August
  - The BBC is to buy the Steven Spielberg produced World War II drama Band of Brothers, the most expensive television series made to date. It will air on BBC One in 2001.
  - The first episode of the countryside drama Down to Earth airs on BBC One, starring Pauline Quirke and Warren Clarke.
- 30 August
  - EastEnders announces the arrival of the Slater family who will join the soap in mid-September as a replacement for the Di Marco family.
  - ITV announces plans to resurrect Crossroads with an updated format in 2001. The channel will also launch a London-based soap to rival EastEnders which is provisionally titled Trafalgar Road.
- 31 August – Reports indicate that David Liddiment at ITV has entered discussions with Peter Bazalgette, creative director of Endemol, over Big Brother moving to ITV for its second series. These are unsuccessful, and the show remains on Channel 4.

=== September ===
- 1–2 September – Sky One hosts a special weekend dedicated to celebrating the tenth anniversary of The Simpsons in the UK.
- 2 September – Debut of the comedy series Lily Live! on ITV, presented by Paul O'Grady as Lily Savage.
- 3 September
  - The US sitcom Malcolm in the Middle makes its UK debut on Sky One.
  - Channel 4 airs the network television premiere of Elizabeth, Shekhar Kapur's 1998 biographical period drama with Australian actress Cate Blanchett as the title role of Queen Elizabeth I, as well as British stars including Geoffrey Rush, Christopher Eccleston, Joseph Fiennes, Richard Attenborough and John Gielgud in his last feature film appearance.
- 4 September – Debut of the police drama Waking the Dead on BBC One.
- 5 September – The BBC has given its permission for Teletubbies to be used in promotional material for a controversial windfarm in Wales in order to help win over critics.
- 7 September – Gretchen Franklin makes her final EastEnders appearance as Ethel Skinner. The character is involved in a controversial euthanasia storyline after asking her friend Dot Cotton (June Brown) to help her end her life because she has terminal cancer.
- 8 September – Foreign affairs documentary Unreported World makes its debut on Channel 4.
- 11 September
  - Granada Media plc agrees to acquire 45% of Irish commercial broadcaster TV3 from the channel's original consortium as part of a deal giving TV3 the right to simulcast programming with ITV.
  - BBC One airs Episode 2000 of EastEnders.
  - Debut of the chat show The Wright Stuff on Channel 5, presented by Matthew Wright.
  - Debut of the sitcom Time Gentlemen Please on Sky One, starring Al Murray.
  - Debut of the long running property series A Place in the Sun on Channel 4.
- 12 September
  - As the fuel protests begin to affect motorists and businesses, Sky News introduces its news ticker and regular updates to keep viewers informed of events concerning the developing crisis. BBC News and ITV News begin regular updates the following day. Through the duration of the crisis, the rolling news channels see an increase in viewers, while audiences for bulletins on BBC One and ITV increase by as much as 50 percent, their highest since the Kosovo War.
  - Debut of Jailbreak, a reality show described as Channel 5's answer to Big Brother, in which contestants can win £100,000 by escaping from a mock prison. The three-week show, presented by Craig Charles, Ruth England and Charlie Stayt is criticised by prisoners' groups. Roberta Woodhouse, Hannah Davies and Laura Hawkins become the first contestants to escape on 23 September.
- 13 September – Peter Salmon, current Controller of BBC One is appointed the broadcaster's new Director of Sport.
- 14 September – Lorraine Heggessey is appointed Controller of BBC One, becoming the first woman to hold the post. She will take over from present Controller, Peter Salmon on 1 November.
- 15 September
  - The first series of Big Brother on Channel 4 is won by Craig Phillips. He announces that he will be giving his £70,000 prize to his friend Joanne Harris who has Down syndrome to pay for her heart and lung transplant.
  - After eleven years on the air, the final edition of Breakfast News is broadcast on BBC One.
- 15 September–1 October – The BBC broadcasts the 2000 Olympic Games with live coverage on BBC One from late evening until the following lunchtime. BBC Two provides alternative live mid-morning coverage during the first week.
- 18 September
  - Launch of The Community Channel, a free-to-air television channel wholly owned by Media Trust and supported by major broadcasters including the BBC.
  - The Independent Television Commission rejects viewer complaints about Channel 5's Naked Jungle in which contestants and presenter Keith Chegwin were seen naked because it was aired after the watershed and did not breach decency regulations.
  - The Slater family make their debut in EastEnders.
- 19 September – Debut of the long-running sitcom My Family on BBC One.
- 20 September – BBC Two airs a special 1970s edition of TOTP2.
- 21 September – ITV announces the return of News at Ten which will air on at least three nights a week from the New Year. The decision comes a week before a judicial review into the ITC's order for the bulletin to be restored was to be heard.
- 23 September
  - The final edition of Fully Booked is broadcast on BBC Two. This brings to an end of an almost 20 year run of Summer-only Saturday morning children's magazine shows on the BBC.
  - The US animated series Futurama makes its terrestrial debut on Channel 4.
- 25 September – Debut of the seven-part series S Club 7 Go Wild! on BBC One.
- 27 September – BBC Two airs a special edition of TOTP2 featuring the hits of John Lennon and presented by Yoko Ono.
- 29 September – Debut of the sitcom Black Books on Channel 4.
- 30 September
  - BBC One airs A Song for Jill, a special gala concert paying tribute to Jill Dando, featuring some of her favourite artists. The concert was arranged to raise funds for the Jill Dando Institute, a crime science unit planned in her memory.
  - Debut of the documentary series A History of Britain on BBC Two, presented by Simon Schama.
- September–October – Jacky Rowland, the BBC News Foreign Correspondent in Yugoslavia is expelled from that country in the wake of the presidential election that saw Vojislav Koštunica defeat Slobodan Milošević for alleged biased reporting. However, it later emerges that Rowland did not leave Yugoslavia, but stayed in hiding as events surrounding the overthrow of Slobodan Milošević unfolded before emerging to report on its conclusion.

=== October ===
- 1 October
  - BBC One airs live coverage of the Closing Ceremony of the 2000 Olympic Games.
  - BBC One airs Return of Nick Cotton, an EastEnders spin-off episode featuring the character of Nick Cotton.
  - Channel 5's Jailbreak concludes after three weeks on the air.
  - Sky One airs Blackadder Back and Forth which is watched by 1.4 million viewers.
- 2 October
  - Q TV a television music channel based on Q Magazine, is launched.
  - ITV soap Emmerdale begins airing five nights a week.
  - The first edition of the BBC's revamped breakfast news programme Breakfast is broadcast. The new programme is carried on both BBC One and BBC News 24. Previously, they had aired their own breakfast programme Breakfast 24.
- 3 October – The BBC confirms it will move its Nine O'Clock News to 10pm from 16 October to compete with ITV's relaunch of News at Ten. The announcement causes surprise as it had been expected the changes would take effect from October 2001. Politicians from all major political parties criticise the BBC's decision, fearing it will affect news quality.
- 4 October
  - Prince Charles joins several television personalities, including Gaby Roslin and Des Lynam to promote Loud Tie Day, a campaign to raise awareness of bowel cancer.
  - Comedy sketches involving abortion, dead babies and people with disabilities that appeared in episodes of Channel 4's Jam are criticised by the Broadcasting Standards Commission because they went "beyond acceptable boundaries in their treatment of issues of particular sensitivity which required greater respect for the vulnerability of those depicted".
- 5 October – The launch of bid-up.tv, later bid.tv.
- 7 October
  - The Saturday morning children's series Live & Kicking is relaunched on BBC One, featuring former Blue Peter presenter Katy Hill, Sarah Cawood, Ortis Deley and Trey Farley.
  - ITV broadcasts highlights of the England v Germany World Cup qualifying match, the last-ever football match to be played at the original Wembley Stadium. The match is broadcast live exclusively on Sky Sports and 45 minutes after the final whistle, England manager Kevin Keegan announces his immediate resignation live on air.
- 9 October
  - The US/Canadian science-fiction television series Gene Roddenberry's Andromeda debuts on Sky One.
  - BBC One airs the Panorama documentary Who Bombed Omagh? which names individuals questioned by police over the 1998 Omagh bombing. The programme is praised by Northern Ireland Secretary Peter Mandelson as "a very powerful and very professional piece of work", but is criticised by Irish Taoiseach Bertie Ahern who warns that "bandying around names on television" could hinder attempts to secure convictions and First Minister David Trimble who says he has "very grave doubts" about it. The programme has also been the subject of legal action by Lawrence Rush whose wife Elizabeth died in the bombing and who sought an injunction to block it from being broadcast.
- 11 October – Coronation Street airs its first hour-long late-night episode in which a siege occurs at the Freshco supermarket. Its broadcast at 10pm features frequent swearing and violence.
- 12 October – The drama series Fat Friends makes its debut on ITV.
- 13 October – The flagship BBC One news programme the Nine O'Clock News ends after a run of 30 years after the BBC earlier announced that it was to move the bulletin to 10pm. The BBC News at Ten is launched on Monday 16 October. The change attracts criticism from both the National Consumer Council and the Culture Secretary Chris Smith. The BBC Nine O'Clock News also moves to its dedicated channel, BBC News 24 on the same day. ITV later announces its intention to reinstate News at Ten from January 2001.
- 16 October
  - Oxfordshire, once part of the BBC's South East region, becomes part of South Today.
  - The first BBC News at Ten is broadcast on BBC One.
- 17 October – The network television premiere of Men in Black on BBC One, starring Will Smith, Tommy Lee Jones, Linda Fiorentino, Vincent D'Onofrio and Rip Torn.
- 20 October – Have I Got News for You returns for a new series, moving from BBC Two to BBC One.
- 21 October
  - Parkinson returns to BBC One for a new series as part of its Saturday night schedule, having previously aired on Fridays since its relaunch in 1998.
  - Helicopter pilot Duncan Bickley loses £218,000 on ITV's Who Wants to Be a Millionaire? after incorrectly answering the £500,000 question. Having reached £250,000 his winnings dropped back to £32,000 after he gave the wrong answer to a question about the name of the aircraft in which Amy Johnson flew solo to Australia in 1930.
- 26 October – 15-year-old Sonia Jackson, a character in EastEnders played by Natalie Cassidy, unexpectedly gives birth to a baby girl called Chloe which comes four months after ITV's Coronation Street ran a similar teenage pregnancy storyline.
- 28 October
  - Footballer David Beckham appears on BBC One's Parkinson, telling the host that he plans to become "the best footballer in the world" while at Manchester United.
  - Channel 4 airs a season of horror films under the title FilmFear which includes Death Race 2000 and the British television premiere of The Texas Chain Saw Massacre, banned in the UK until 1999.
- 30 October
  - The game show Blockbusters relaunches on Sky One for a second time, presented by Liza Tarbuck.
  - The League of Gentlemen embark on their first national stage tour, originally planning 14 dates but ending up completing 111.
- 31 October – The Weakest Link makes its BBC One debut as part of the channel's evening schedule. Billed as the Champions' League, the series sees winning contestants from BBC Two's daytime version of the quiz return to compete for a £20,000 prize, double the amount offered by the daytime show.

=== November ===
- 2 November
  - As Channel 4 reaches its 18th birthday, a special edition of Countdown celebrates the show's 18th anniversary. Instead of the usual contestants, Gyles Brandreth and Mark Nyman take on Jo Brand and Damian Eadie in the letters and numbers quiz, while Richard Whiteley and Carol Vorderman recall their memories of the show's beginnings.
  - Mother-of-two Kate Heusser becomes UK television's biggest female prize winner after winning £500,000 on ITV's Who Wants to Be a Millionaire?. Later this month, the show would have its first £1 million winner.
- 6–10 November – Channel 4 celebrates 18 years of Brookside with a run of five episodes over four nights in which viewers learn details of the demise of Susannah Morrisey (played by Karen Drury) through a series of flashbacks.
- 10 November
  - Channel 5 have commissioned a six-part run of Late Night with Jerry Springer, a new late-night chat show that will begin airing weekly from 22 November. Guests on the series will include Steven Berkoff, Louise Redknapp, Billie Piper, Dani Behr, Marc Almond and Fay Ripley.
  - TFI Friday returns to Channel 4 for its final series, featuring various guest presenters in place of Chris Evans who left in June. The first guest presenters were the Spice Girls.
- 13 November – BBC News reports that Russian state broadcaster RTR has bought the popular children's series Teletubbies, a programme unlike anything it has aired before.
- 15 November – ITV airs The Remorseful Day, the final episode of the Inspector Morse series.
- 16 November – Tony Blair's Chief of Communications Alastair Campbell tells political journalists that US-style televised election debates are virtually inevitable and that inter-party talks are under way to establish ground rules for such a debate, as long as the "chemistry" is right.
- 17 November
  - BBC One airs the 2000 Children in Need telethon. By the following day, it has raised £12m for charity, surpassing the 1999 total of £11.2m.
  - FilmFour airs Gough Lewis's controversial 1999 documentary Sex: The Annabel Chong Story.
- 20 November – Judith Keppel becomes the first contestant to win £1 million on ITV's Who Wants to Be a Millionaire?. On the same evening, the final episode of the long-running sitcom One Foot in the Grave is shown on BBC One in the same timeslot. It is later speculated that Keppel's win was fixed so that ITV would draw ratings away from BBC One. However, the ITC clears Celador and ITV of the allegations.
- 23 November
  - The BBC and ITV announce plans for two one-hour televised leaders debates during the run-up to the next general election. Subject to the leaders of Britain's three main political parties agreeing to participate, a debate would be held by each broadcaster and chaired by David and Jonathan Dimbleby respectively. However, after Prime Minister Tony Blair declines to take part in January 2001, three separate question and answer sessions involving a single leader are held by each network during the 2001 election campaign.
  - Amanda Barrie who plays Alma Halliwell in Coronation Street announces her intention to leave the soap in Summer 2001.
- 28 November – Filming has begun on the new series of Crossroads, BBC News reports. The revived soap would begin airing on ITV in March 2001.
- November – UK Play is renamed Play UK.

=== December ===
- 1 December – The BBC apologises to ITV for suggesting it rigged Judith Keppel's win on Who Wants to Be a Millionaire? as part of a ratings battle.
- 2 December – Nicola Kirsch wins the twelfth series of Stars in Their Eyes on ITV, performing as Maria Callas.
- 8 December
  - SMG acquires a 14.9% stake in Scottish Radio Holdings. and four months later it increases its stake to 27.7%.
  - Coronation Street celebrates its 40th year on the air by broadcasting a live hour-long episode. Prince Charles makes a cameo in the episode, appearing in a pre-recorded segment as himself in an ITV News bulletin report, presented by Trevor McDonald.
  - BBC One airs Freddie Mercury: The Untold Story, a documentary in which friends and relatives of Freddie Mercury recall their memories of the Queen frontman.
- 9 December – Westlife's single "My Love" wins the 2000 Record of the Year, giving the Irish boyband their second win in a row.
- 10 December – Rower Steve Redgrave is named as this year's BBC Sports Personality of the Year.
- 11 December
  - BBC One airs a BBC News special, Prince William in Chile, showing footage of Prince William's charity expedition to Chilean Patagonia with Raleigh International. The prince was interviewed and filmed during the ten-week trip, with an interview released to the media on 10 December.
  - The Independent Television Commission criticises Channel 4's early evening scheduling of US TV series Angel, a drama about a reformed vampire which it says includes scenes "reminiscent of a late-night horror film". The channel aired edited episodes of the series in the early evening, but some viewers had complained it was inappropriate for children, while others had complained about the scenes being cut. The ITC felt that three of the edited episodes had still contained unsuitable matter for family viewing. The series has since been moved to a later time slot where it can be aired uncut.
  - The final episode of the children's series Sooty Heights is broadcast on ITV.
- 12 December – Culture Secretary Chris Smith announces plans for the creation of the Office of Communications (Ofcom), a watchdog that would oversee the regulation of the UK broadcasting and telecommunications industries and take over responsibility from several current bodies, including the Broadcasting Standards Commission and Office of Telecommunications.
- 17 December – "Can We Fix It?", the theme tune to the CBBC series Bob the Builder, tops the UK Singles Chart, becoming this year's Christmas number one.
- 18 December – The British Film Institute publishes its list of the 100 Greatest British Television Programmes of the 20th century. Compiled by a poll of industry professionals, Fawlty Towers tops the list, followed by Cathy Come Home and Doctor Who.
- 21 December – Channel 5's 12-part series X-Rated which includes reviews of pornographic films is criticised as unacceptable by the Independent Television Commission after it showed clips of an R18 film that can only be bought from specialist suppliers.
- 22 December
  - A contestant in the grand final of Series 29 of the Channel 4 quiz show Fifteen to One who cannot be identified for legal reasons, is edited out of the episode. The contestant, standing at position 4, is eliminated in the first round, having answered two questions incorrectly. The two questions are cut from the sequence, while the camera jumps from positions 3 to 5. From Round 2, the show continues as normal.
  - The final edition of the Channel 4 entertainment show TFI Friday is broadcast. It is later revived for a one-off special and then a full series in 2015.
- 23 December – ITV shows the 1993 Tim Burton animated film, The Nightmare Before Christmas for the first time.
- 24 December – Channel 4 shows the 1999 version of A Christmas Carol starring Patrick Stewart, Richard E. Grant and Dominic West.
- 25 December – BBC One airs the UK television premiere of James Cameron's 1997 Oscar Winning Blockbuster, Titanic, starring Leonardo DiCaprio and Kate Winslet. Overnight figures of the premiere attracts an audience of 9.9 million. ITV has seven of the top ten most watched programmes of the day. Other popular Christmas Day shows include Coronation Street (ITV, 13.7m), EastEnders (BBC One, 12.1m) and Who Wants to Be a Millionaire? (ITV, 11.1m).
- 27 December
  - BBC One airs a celebrity edition of Robot Wars, participants include Vic Reeves, Chris Eubank and boy band Five.
  - ITV airs Sinatra: Good Guy Bad Guy, a programme investigating Frank Sinatra's alleged links to the Mafia. The film was made without the permission of the Sinatra family and includes friends and colleagues discussing the late singer, some talking about him for the first time.
- December – SMG acquires a 14.9% stake in Scottish Radio Holdings. Four months later, it increases its stake to 27.7%.

== Debuts ==
=== BBC ===
- 1 January – Castaway 2000 (2000–2001)
- 4 January
  - The Ghost Hunter (2000–2002)
  - Murder Rooms: Mysteries of the Real Sherlock Holmes (2000–2001)
- 7 January – Yoho Ahoy (2000–2001)
- 9 January – Second Sight (2000–2001)
- 13 January – Beast (2000–2001)
- 17 January – Gormenghast (2000)
- 23 January – Clocking Off (2000–2003)
- 4 February – My Hero (2000–2006)
- 14 February – Nature Boy (2000)
- 20 February – Hyperlinks (2000–2001)
- 23 February
  - Hero to Zero (2000)
  - Child of Our Time (2000–present)
- 25 February – Perfect World (2000–2001)
- 27 February – Monarch of the Glen (2000–2005)
- 28 February – Bruiser (2000)
- 29 February – Blouse and Skirt (2000)
- 6 March – Cry Wolf (2000)
- 13 March – Bargain Hunt (2000–present)
- 16 March – Dirty Work (2000)
- 18 March – Randall & Hopkirk (2000–2001)
- 20 March – Techno Games (2000–2003)
- 26 March – Doctors (2000–2024)
- 2 April – Deceit (2000)
- 3 April – 64 Zoo Lane (2000–2013)
- 6 April – L.A. 7 (2000)
- 7 April – Sheeep (2000–2001)
- 10 April – Madame Bovary (2000)
- 23 April – Football Fever (2000–2001)
- 26 April – The Big Impression (2000–2004)
- 30 April – Hearts and Bones (2000–2001)
- 2 May – Fish (2000)
- 11 May – Nice Girl (2000)
- 12 May – Coupling (2000–2004)
- 30 May – Liquid News (2000–2004)
- 1 June – Clarkson's Car Years (2000)
- 15 June
  - McCready and Daughter (2000–2001)
  - Chambers (2000–2001)
- 26 June – The Syndicate (2000)
- 27 June – A Many Splintered Thing (2000)
- 13 July – Head on Comedy (2000)
- 16 July – Border Cafe (2000)
- 22 July – I Love the '70s (2000)
- 24 July – Xchange (2000–2006)
- 25 July – Glasgow Kiss (2000)
- 7 August – Tinsel Town (2000–2001)
- 14 August – The Weakest Link (2000–2012, 2017–present)
- 28 August – Down to Earth (2000–2005)
- 4 September – Waking the Dead (2000–2011)
- 10 September – Other People's Children (2000)
- 11 September – A Likeness in Stone (2000)
- 19 September – My Family (2000–2011)
- 25 September
  - The Magic Key (2000–2001)
  - S Club 7 Go Wild! (2000)
- 26 September
  - Attachments (2000–2002)
  - Marion and Geoff (2000–2003)
- 27 September – Big Kids (2000)
- 30 September – A History of Britain (2000–2002)
- 2 October – Breakfast (2000–present)
- 8 October
  - Care (2000)
  - Top of the Pops Plus (2000–2001)
- 12 October – The Lampies (2000–2001)
- 16 October – BBC News at Ten (2000–present)
- 20 October – Too Much Sun (2000)
- 24 October – The Sins (2000)
- 6 November – What the Romans Did for Us (2000)
- 13 November – Human Remains (2000)
- 15 November – State of the Planet (2000)
- 24 November – Conquistadors (2000)
- 26 November – Take a Girl Like You (2000)
- 26 December – The Sleeper (2000)
- 28 December – Donovan Quick (2000)

=== ITV (Including ITV and ITV2) ===
- 4 January
  - Grizzly Tales for Gruesome Kids (2000–2006, 2011–2012)
  - Dog and Duck (2000–2003)
- 5 January
  - Bomber (2000)
  - Meeow! (2000–2002)
- 7 January – Whatever I Want (2000)
- 10 January
  - Life Force (2000)
  - Little Grey Rabbit (2000–2001)
- 20 January – At Home with the Braithwaites (2000–2003)
- 21 January
  - The Secret (2000)
  - The Unforgettable (2000–2002, 2010–2012)
- 26 January – This Is Personal: The Hunt for the Yorkshire Ripper (2000)
- 11 February – Reach for the Moon (2000)
- 1 March – Big Meg, Little Meg (2000–2001)
- 10 March – The Baskervilles (2000)
- 12 March – Hero of the Hour (2000)
- 13 March
  - Savage Planet (2000–2000s)
  - The Blind Date (2000)
- 19 March – Seeing Red (2000)
- 26 March – The Last Musketeer (2000)
- 27 March – Monsignor Renard (2000)
- 2 April – Bob Martin (2000–2001)
- 23 April – The Railway Children (2000)
- 24 April – Cor, Blimey! (2000)
- 26 April – Rebus (2000–2007)
- 1 May – Metropolis (2000)
- 11 May – Harry and the Wrinklies (2000–2002)
- 17 May – Lady Audley's Secret (2000)
- 28 May – Baddiel and Skinner Unplanned (2000–2005)
- 7 June – The Coral Island (2000)
- 25 June – Up Rising (2000)
- 26 June – In Defence (2000)
- 6 July – Burnside (2000)
- 12 July – Pay and Display (2000)
- 13 August – The People Versus (2000–2002)
- 31 August – Safe As Houses (2000)
- 2 September – Lily Live! (2000–2001)
- 3 September – Anchor Me (2000)
- 7 September – Blind Ambition (2000)
- 17 September – My Fragile Heart (2000)
- 21 September – Preston Pig (2000)
- 24 September – Dirty Tricks (2000)
- 1 October – Lenny Blue (2000–2002) (also known as Tough Love)
- 2 October – Without Motive (2000–2001)
- 12 October – Fat Friends (2000–2005)
- 23 November – Close and True (2000)
- 24 November – A Dinner of Herbs (2000)

=== Channel 4 ===
- 12 January – Shipwrecked (2000–2001, 2006–2009, E4: 2011–2012, 2019)
- 13 January – That Peter Kay Thing (2000)
- 14 January – Trigger Happy TV (2000–2003)
- 16 January – The Wilsons (2000)
- 23 March – Jam / Jaaaaam (2000)
- 30 March – Da Ali G Show (2000–2004)
- 25 April – The Secret World of Michael Fry (2000)
- 9 May
  - Anna Karenina (2000)
  - Walter: The Secret Life of a Victorian Pornographer (2000)
- 29 May – Lock, Stock... (2000)
- 14 July – Big Brother (Channel 4: 2000–2010, Channel 5: 2011–2018, ITV2: 2023–present)
- 8 September – Unreported World (2000—present)
- 11 September – A Place in the Sun (2000—present)
- 23 September – Futurama (1999–2013)
- 29 September – Black Books (2000–2004)
- 30 September – The Kids from Room 402 (1999–2001)
- 18 October – North Square (2000)
- 27 December – Mind Control (2000–2003)
- Unknown – Stark Raving Mad (1999–2000)

=== Channel 5 ===
- 17 May – Urban Gothic (2000–2001)
- 18 May – Ex-Rated (2000)
- 22 May – Animal Airport (2000)
- 6 June – Naked Jungle (2000)
- 11 September – The Wright Stuff (2000–present)
- 12 September – Jailbreak (2000)
- November – Headless (2000)
- 26 December – Audrey and Friends (2000; 2002)

=== S4C ===
- 6 June – Porc Peis Bach (2000–2005)
- Unknown – The Celts (2000–?)
- Unknown – Hacio (2000–present)

=== Play UK ===
- Unknown – TOTP@Play (2000–2001)

=== Sky One ===
- 7 January – Angel (1999–2004)
- 10 January
  - The West Wing (1999–2006)
  - Shasta McNasty (1999–2000)
- 11 January – Third Watch (1999–2005)
- 15 February – The Strangerers (2000)
- 9 April – The 10th Kingdom (2000)
- 17 April – Mega Babies (1999–2001)
- 6 July – Popular (1999–2001)
- 24 August – Once and Again (1999–2002)
- 3 September – Malcolm in the Middle (2000–2006)
- 11 September
  - Harry Enfield's Brand Spanking New Show (2000)
  - Time Gentlemen Please (2000–2002)
  - Titus (2000–2002)
- 24 September
  - Higher Ground (2000)
  - Relic Hunter (1999–2002)
- 9 October – Gene Roddenberry's Andromeda (2000–2005)
- 29 October – TV Years (2000–2001)
- 12 November – The Stretch (2000)
- Undated – Get Real (1999–2000)
- Unknown – Roswell (1999–2002)

=== Disney Channel UK ===
- 4 September – Monster by Mistake (1996–2003)
- 8 September – The Weekenders (2000–2004)

=== Nickelodeon UK ===
- 3 January – SpongeBob SquarePants (1999–present)
- 4 September – Saved By The Bell (1989–1994)

=== Nick Jr. UK ===
- Unknown
  - Hooley Dooleys (2001)
  - Little Bill (1999–2004)

=== Cartoon Network UK ===
- 11 January – Courage the Cowardly Dog (1999–2002)
- 2 February – Mike, Lu and Og (1999–2001)
- 28 February – Fat Dog Mendoza (2000–2001)
- 6 March – Dragon Ball Z
- 17 April – Angela Anaconda (1999–2001)
- 4 September – Batman Beyond (1999–2001)
- Unknown
  - Fly Tales (1999–2001)

=== Fox Kids UK ===
- 8 January – The Tick (1994–1996)
- 1 April – Digimon (1999–2000)
- 4 September – Flint The Time Detective (1998)

=== Discovery Kids ===
- Undated – Hi-5 (1999–2011, 2017–present)

== Channels ==
=== New channels ===
Date	Channel
1 February	Discovery Kids
1 February	Discovery Wings
1 March	Tara TV
30 March	UK Drama
17 April	Ideal World
25 May	Hallmark Channel
27 May	Boomerang
1 July	TCM UK
1 August	ITN News Channel
18 September	Community Channel
29 September	Playhouse Disney
29 September	Toon Disney
2 October	Q
5 October	bid-up.tv

=== Pay Defunct channels ===
Date	Channel
2000	ONTV (CableTel (UK) ltd) (Pay TV (UK))

=== Defunct channels ===
Date	Channel
31 January	Carlton Kids
1 February	Carlton World
1 March	Carlton Select
30 March	UK Arena
1 July	TNT UK

== Television shows ==
=== Changes of network affiliation ===
Shows	Moved from	Moved to
Telly Addicts	BBC One	Challenge
Nine O'Clock News	BBC One	BBC News 24
Have I Got News for You	BBC Two	BBC One
Blockbusters	BBC Two	Sky One
King of the Hill (First run rights)	Channel 4	Sky One
V	Channel 5	Sci-Fi Channel
Babar	Nick Jr.	Channel 5
Mega Babies	Sky One	Channel 5
Fat Dog Mendoza	Cartoon Network	Channel 5
The Powerpuff Girls	Cartoon Network	Channel 5
Angela Anaconda	Cartoon Network	Channel 4
Fly Tales	Cartoon Network	BBC One
Mona the Vampire	Nickelodeon	BBC One
Rotten Ralph	BBC One	Nickelodeon
Professor Bubble	The Children's Channel	Living
Sesame Street	Disney Channel	Nick Jr.
Ned's Newt	Disney Channel	Cartoon Network
Theodore Tugboat	ITV2	Discovery Kids
Family Guy	Sky One	Channel 4
Futurama	Sky One	Channel 4
Franklin	Sky One	Channel 4

=== Returning this year after a break of one year or longer ===
- 16 October – One Foot in the Grave (1990–1997, 2000)
- 30 October – Blockbusters (1983–93, 1994–95, 1997, 2000–01, 2012, 2019)
- 17 November – Butterflies (1978–1983, 2000)

== Continuing television shows ==
=== 1920s ===
- BBC Wimbledon (1927–1939, 1946–2019, 2021–present)

=== 1930s ===
- Trooping the Colour (1937–1939, 1946–2019, 2023–present)
- The Boat Race (1938–1939, 1946–2019, 2021–present)

=== 1950s ===
- Panorama (1953–present)
- What the Papers Say (1956–2008)
- Captain Pugwash (1957–1975, 1997–2002)
- The Sky at Night (1957–present)
- Blue Peter (1958–present)
- Grandstand (1958–2007)

=== 1960s ===
- Coronation Street (1960–present)
- Songs of Praise (1961–present)
- Top of the Pops (1964–2006)
- Match of the Day (1964–present)
- Call My Bluff (1965–2005)
- The Money Programme (1966–2010)
- Gardeners World (1968–present)
- A Question of Sport (1968, 1970–2023)

=== 1970s ===
- Emmerdale (1972–present)
- Newsround (1972–present)
- Last of the Summer Wine (1973–2010)
- Wish You Were Here...? (1974–2003)
- Arena (1975–present)
- One Man and His Dog (1976–present)
- Grange Hill (1978–2008)
- Blankety Blank (1979–1990, 1997–2002)
- Antiques Roadshow (1979–present)
- Question Time (1979–present)

=== 1980s ===
- Children in Need (1980–present)
- Timewatch (1982–present)
- Brookside (1982–2003)
- Countdown (1982–present)
- Right to Reply (1982–2001)
- James the Cat (1984–1992, 1998–2003)
- The Bill (1984–2010)
- The Cook Report (1987–2000)
- Channel 4 Racing (1984–2016)
- Thomas the Tank Engine & Friends (1984–present)
- EastEnders (1985–present)
- Comic Relief (1985–present)
- Casualty (1986–present)
- ChuckleVision (1987–2009)
- London's Burning (1988–2002)
- On the Record (1988–2002)
- Fifteen to One (1988–2003, 2013–2019)
- This Morning (1988–present)

=== 1990s ===
- Stars in Their Eyes (1990–2006, 2015)
- Big Break (1991–2002)
- Heartbeat (1992–2010)
- The Big Breakfast (1992–2002 2021–2022)
- 999 (1992–2003)
- Breakfast with Frost (1993–2005)
- Wipeout (1994–2003)
- Animal Hospital (1994–2004)
- Room 101 (1994–2007, 2012–2018)
- Time Team (1994–2013)
- The National Lottery Draws (1994–2017)
- Top of the Pops 2 (1994–2017)
- Hollyoaks (1995–present)
- Ballykissangel (1996–2001)
- Y Clwb Rygbi, Wales (1997–present)
- Dream Team (1997–2007)
- Family Affairs (1997–2005)
- 100% (1997–2001)
- Teletubbies (1997–2002, 2007–2009, 2012, 2015–2018)
- Robot Wars (1998–2004, 2016–2018)
- Midsomer Murders (1997–present)
- Don't Try This at Home (1998–2001)
- Who Wants to Be a Millionaire? (1998–2014, 2018–present)
- Bob the Builder (1998–present)
- British Soap Awards (1999–2019, 2022–present)
- The League of Gentlemen (1999–2002)
- Holby City (1999–2022)
- See It Saw It (1999–2001)
- Spaced (1999–2001)
- Tweenies (1999–2002)

== Ending this year ==
- Nine O'Clock News (1970–2000)
- Pingu (1986–2000, 2004–2006)
- Inspector Morse (1987–2000)
- Mike and Angelo (1989–2000)
- One Foot in the Grave (1990–2000)
- Rosie and Jim (1990–2000)
- Gladiators (1992–2000, 2008–2009, 2024–present)
- One Foot in the Past (1993–2000)
- Mr. Motivator exercise routines (1993–2000)
- Can't Cook, Won't Cook (1995–2000)
- TFI Friday (1996–2000)
- dinnerladies (1998–2000)
- Heartburn Hotel (1998–2000)
- Sunburn (1999–2000)
- Hope and Glory (1999–2000)
- Queer as Folk (1999–2000)
- Insides Out (1999–2000)

== Births ==
- 28 June – Ruben Reuter, actor
- 29 June – Kia Pegg, actress
- 5 October – Millie Innes, actress

== Deaths ==
Date	Name	Age	Cinematic credibility
13 January	Eric Dodson	79	actor (Rumpole of the Bailey, It Ain't Half Hot Mum, Porridge)
28 January	Joy Shelton	77	actress
28 January	Kenneth Waller	72	actor (Old Mr. Grace in Are You Being Served?)
7 February	Stewart Farrar	83	television scriptwriter
7 March	Charles Gray	71	actor (An Englishman Abroad, Bergerac)
10 April	Peter Jones	79	actor (The Rag Trade, Mr Digby, Darling)
11 April	Diana Darvey	54	actress (The Benny Hill Show)
20 April	Bill Dean	78	actor (Harry Cross in Brookside)
24 April	William Moore	84	actor (Cyril Turpin in Coronation Street)
1 May	Nora Swinburne	97	actress (The Forsyte Saga, Fall of Eagles)
3 May	Lewis Allen	94	television director
18 May	Denis Gifford	72	television scriptwriter
21 May	John Gielgud	96	actor
25 May	Nicholas Clay	53	actor (Will Shakespeare, The Search for Alexander the Great)
30 May	Doris Hare	95	actress (On the Buses)
24 June	David Tomlinson	83	actor
27 June	David Neal	68	actor
28 June	Michael Ripper	87	actor (Butterflies, Freewheelers)
29 June	John Abineri	72	actor (Doctor Who, The Moon Stallion)
22 July	Eric Christmas	84	actor
27 July	Paddy Joyce	77	actor (Coronation Street, EastEnders)
5 August	Alec Guinness	86	actor (Tinker Tailor Soldier Spy, Smiley's People)
6 August	Sir Robin Day	74	political broadcaster and commentator
13 August	Terence Feely	72	television screenwriter (The Gentle Touch)
29 August	Shelagh Fraser	79	actress (A Family at War, Star Wars)
6 September	Desmond Wilcox	69	documentary maker and television producer
9 September	Bill Waddington	84	music hall performer, comedian and actor
17 September	Paula Yates	41	television presenter and writer
25 September	Tommy Reilly	81	harmonica player, played theme to Dial 999
17 October	Ivan Owen	73	voice actor (The Basil Brush Show)
30 October	Elizabeth Bradley	78	actress (Maud Grimes in Coronation Street)
4 November	Stephanie Lawrence	50	actress
9 November	Eric Morley	82	Impresario and creator of the Miss World competition
9 November	Hugh Paddick	85	actor (The Benny Hill Show, Blackadder)
20 November	Morris Barry	82	television producer
15 December	Trevor Adams	54	actor (The Fall and Rise of Reginald Perrin, Fawlty Towers)

== See also ==
- 2000 in British music
- 2000 in British radio
- 2000 in the United Kingdom
- List of British films of 2000
