= Oddballs (comedy troupe) =

British comedy troupe

The Oddballs are a British comedy act formed in 1980 by Danny Blue and Richard Welsh.

Television appearances include EastEnders, Taggart, The Des O'Connor Show, The Big Breakfast, The Salon, Sextasy, Trisha Goddard (formerly Trisha), Vanessa, The Broker's Man, and Portugal's top television comedy show, Levanta-te e Ri.

They have also appeared theaters in the London's West End theatre and across the country touring with Jim Davidson in the adult pantomimes Sinderella and Sinderella Comes Again. The current line-up is Blue, Mark Gale, and Doughty.

They are best known for their "Naked Balloon Dance". They have also caused controversy, including an attempt to ban the show from Bury St Edmunds, Suffolk. Saved only by Robert Everitt, Conservative councillor for the Risbygate Ward, who called it "extremely funny - not at all rude, just risqué." During the 1980s, Blue introduced the outrageous sport of Dwarf Throwing and later went on to win the World Title in Australia in 1986.

Adrian Doughty, from the Oddballs, comments "It never ceases to amaze me the bizarre to the ridiculous places we are booked to perform this, so very funny act. A good example I will never forget was a guy in East London whose mother always wished for a toy boy. So it came to pass whilst lying in her coffin, in the crematorium, the Oddballs were confronted with all her loving family, tears and all. As the last beat of the famous instrumental "Wheels" came to an end, so I pushed the button, the curtain closed and to my amazement the tears before me had turned to smile's..."
