= Vanessa Feltz =

English broadcaster and journalist (born 1962)

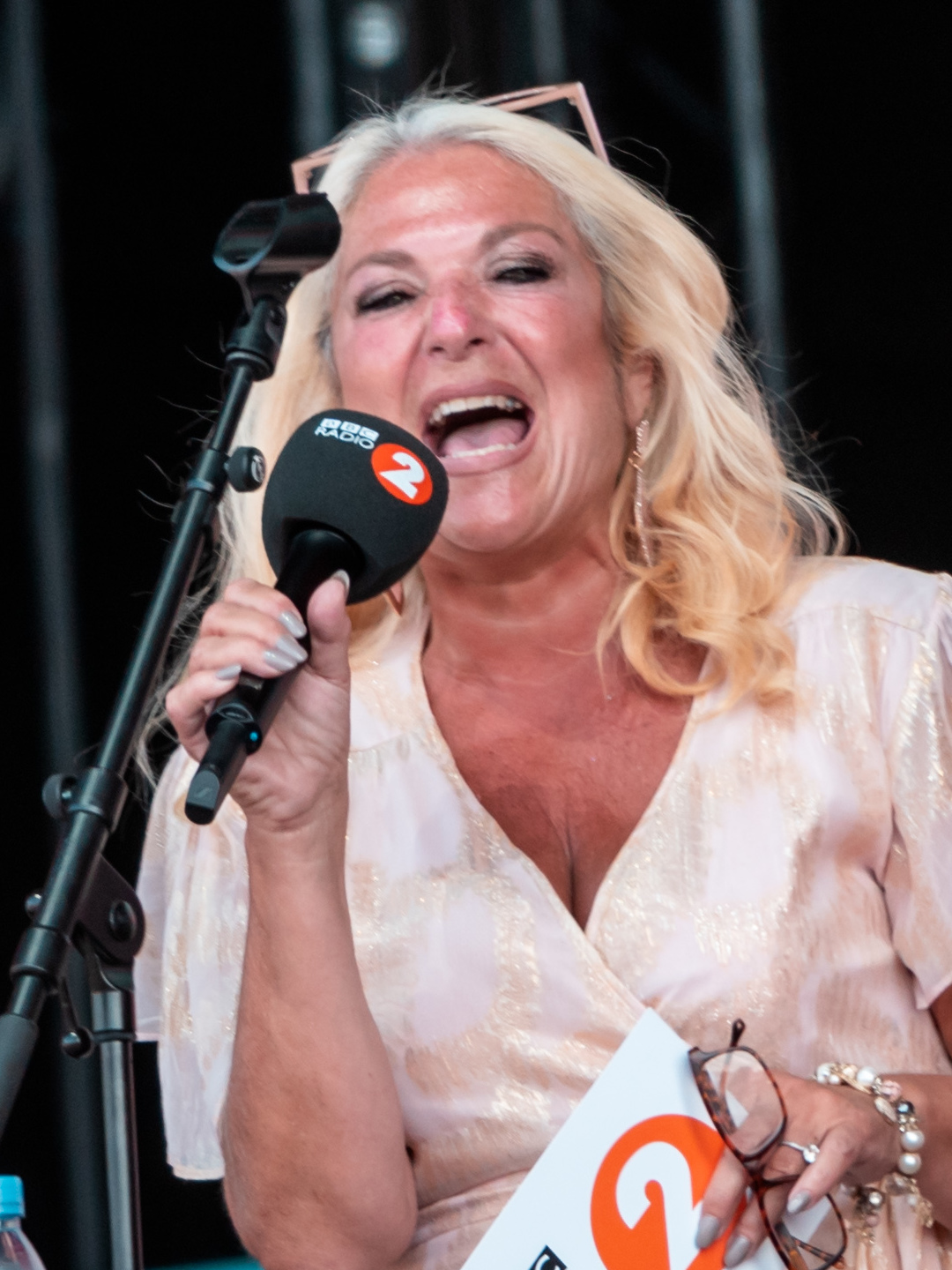
- Feltz in 2019
- Born: Vanessa Jane Feltz; 21 February 1962 (age 64); London, England
- Education: Haberdashers' Aske's School for Girls; Trinity College, Cambridge (BA)
- Occupations: Television presenter; broadcaster; journalist
- Years active: 1989–present
- Employer(s): BBC Radio (1989–2022); News UK (2022–2024); Global (2024–present); 5 (2025–2026)
- Television: Vanessa; The Big Breakfast; The Vanessa Show; This Morning
- Spouse: Michael Kurer (m. 1985; div. 2000)
- Partner(s): Ben Ofoedu (2006–2023)
- Children: 2

Vanessa Jane Feltz (born 21 February 1962) is a television presenter, broadcaster, and journalist. She has presented the chat shows Vanessa (1994–1998, 2025–2026), The Vanessa Show (1999, 2011) and Vanessa's Real Lives (2006), as well as fronting segments on programmes including The Big Breakfast (1996–1998), The Wright Stuff (2003–2005) and This Morning (2006–2025).

Feltz presented an early morning radio show on BBC Radio 2 from 2011 to 2022 and also hosted the Breakfast Show on BBC Radio London. Between 2022 and 2024, she presented a weekday drivetime show on Talkradio and TalkTV. In 2024, Feltz joined LBC to present her own show. She also appeared as a housemate on the first series of Celebrity Big Brother in 2001 and Ultimate Big Brother in 2010, as well as appearing as a contestant on the eleventh series of Strictly Come Dancing in 2013.

== Early life ==
Feltz was born into a Jewish family on 21 February 1962 in a hospital on the Holloway Road in London, England to Valerie Joy (née Ohrenstein; 1938–1995) and Norman Harold Feltz (1936–2019), who worked in the lingerie business. Feltz was raised in Pine Grove in Totteridge. She has a younger sister, Julia, three years her junior. Feltz was educated at Haberdashers' Aske's School for Girls, an independent school in Elstree, Hertfordshire. She then read English at Trinity College, Cambridge, graduating with a first-class degree.

== Career ==
=== 1980–1999: Early career and talk shows ===
Feltz was the first female columnist for The Jewish Chronicle and later joined the Daily Mirror. She wrote her first book at this time entitled What Are These Strawberries Doing on My Nipples? I Need Them for the Fruit Salad. She also served as a magistrate from the age of 28, but was asked to stand down when she became recognisable by the defendants from her TV appearances. Feltz came to prominence whilst presenting the ITV daytime television chat show, Vanessa, made by Anglia Television between 1994 to 1998. The programme saw Feltz being joined by a series of guests, and would attempt to resolve their issues, often with the commentary of a studio audience. In August 1998, it was reported that Feltz had been sacked by Anglia due to her demands to have her wages doubled to £2.75 million. Feltz also wanted the show's production base moved from Ipswich to London and to front more prime-time shows. The programme aired its final episode in September 1998, with ITV replacing her show with Trisha.

From 1995 to 2001, Feltz presented the BBC consumer affairs programme Value for Money. In 1996, Feltz replaced Paula Yates on Channel 4's morning TV show The Big Breakfast, presenting a regular item where she interviewed celebrities whilst lying on a bed. Feltz assumed this role until 1998, and alleged that during her time on the show she was sexually assaulted by Rolf Harris while interviewing him on the programme. In 1997, Feltz was tricked by the spoof TV show Brass Eye.

In 1999, Feltz moved to the BBC to host a similar show, The Vanessa Show, which began in 1999, as part of a reported £2.7 million deal. The show received negative publicity after it was reported that several guests who appeared on the programme had been recruited from an acting agency, with the show being cancelled soon afterwards.

=== 2000–2010: Radio and television appearances ===
In 2001, Feltz appeared as a housemate on the first series of Celebrity Big Brother for Comic Relief. During her time in the house, she refused to return a piece of a chalk used for a task to Big Brother, and began writing various synonyms meaning incarceration on the dining table. She became the second housemate to be evicted on Day 4. The same year, Feltz joined the local radio station BBC London 94.9 to present a mid-afternoon phone-in show and it continued to run since then at various times, from 2005 to 2015 at 09.00 to noon. From 2016 it was broadcast from 07.00 to 10.00 Monday to Friday. She hosted her last show for the station on 26 August 2022.

In 2002, she made a cameo appearance in the comedy film Once Upon a Time in the Midlands. In May 2003, she was voted 93rd on the list of worst Britons in Channel 4's poll of the 100 Worst Britons. Feltz also made appearances on game shows including an episode of Russian Roulette, hosted by Rhona Cameron.

In 2004, she made a guest appearance in a Marjorie Dawes sketch in Little Britain. The same year, she appeared on the ITV series Celebrity Fit Club, and was team captain of her group, which ultimately won. In 2006, Feltz made a comeback to ITV as the host of a new daytime talk show. Vanessa's Real Lives was produced by Endemol's Brighter Pictures and ran for only one series.

Feltz returned to the Big Brother house in September 2010 as a housemate on Ultimate Big Brother, the last series to be broadcast on Channel 4. She entered the house as a late entrant on Day 11, and was evicted from the house five days later on 8 September, two days before the final.

=== 2011–present: Talk show reboots and other work ===
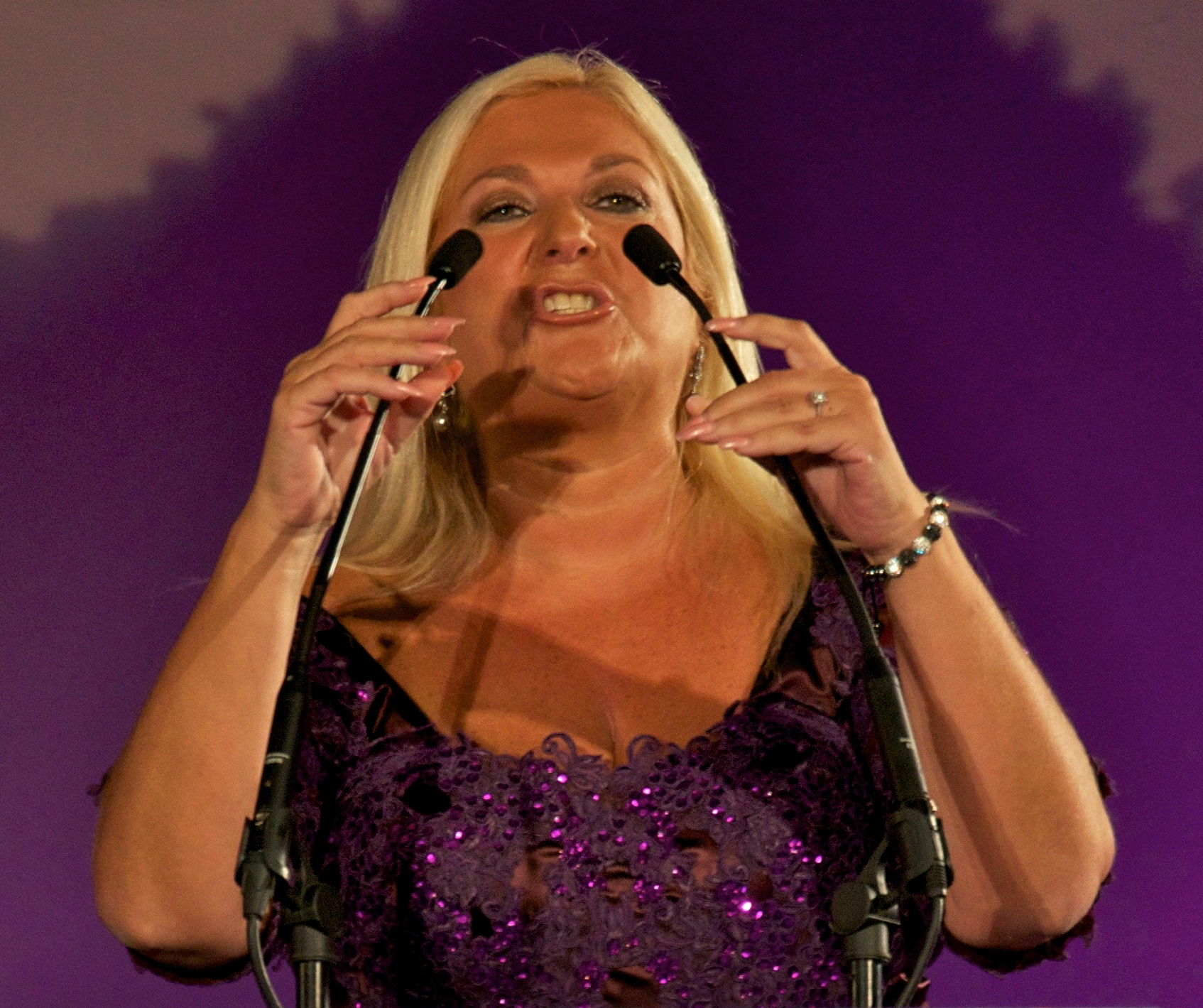
Feltz speaking at the Stonewall Awards where she received the award for Journalist of the Year in November 2011

Feltz took on a greater workload of radio and TV presenting in 2011. In January of that year, she began hosting the BBC Radio 2 Early Breakfast Show and a rebooted version of her programme The Vanessa Show on Channel 5. In March 2011, Channel 5 moved the topical daytime show to an afternoon slot at 14:15 following disappointing ratings for the morning slot. The move allowed Feltz to appear in live editions of her TV show after her morning radio commitments. The show featured a mix of celebrity interviews, news items and debate around a range of issues. Ratings eventually improved and a second series of the show was planned to commence in September 2011 but it never went ahead. The Guardian's "Media Monkey" blog dubbed Feltz "officially the hardest working woman in broadcasting" due to her weekday broadcasting commitments.

Feltz hosted the Early Breakfast Show for the next decade, initially broadcasting from 05:00 until 06:30 each weekday in the slot formerly occupied by Sarah Kennedy. Writing of her Radio 2 debut, The Daily Telegraph radio critic, Gillian Reynolds described Feltz's voice as "like lemon tea with honey". From January 2021, her show was extended by an hour and began at the earlier time of 04:00. She often covered Jeremy Vine's news and current affairs show on Radio 2 when Vine was away. During this time her early breakfast show was covered by another presenter, usually Nicki Chapman. Feltz announced in July 2022 that she would leave the show the following day, and Radio 2 after 2 weeks of covering for Jeremy Vine on 26 August. She was succeeded by weatherman Owain Wyn Evans permanently in February 2023.

Between September and October 2013, Feltz appeared as a contestant eleventh series of Strictly Come Dancing. She was partnered with James Jordan, and they became the second couple to be eliminated, after losing a dance-off to Julien Macdonald and Janette Manrara in the third week of the competition. In September 2013, she re-entered the Celebrity Big Brother house to take part in a task for the twelfth series. She left the house the same day. She also returned again in January 2016 and January 2017 respectively, for tasks in the seventeenth and nineteenth series, the former of which she held a press conference for the housemates, and latter of which she assumed the role of a court judge.

In July 2019, the BBC Annual Report recorded that Feltz was one of three women, along with Claudia Winkleman and Zoe Ball, amongst the ten highest paid BBC presenters, with a salary of £355,000.

In January 2024, it was reported that over 2,000 complaints had been made to Ofcom regarding Feltz's comments on coeliac disease during an episode of This Morning. After a caller said their mother-in-law did not allow them to serve anything but gluten-free food at Christmas dinner, Feltz responded "So she's treating coeliac disease as if it's a potentially fatal peanut allergy and they can't have anything with gluten in the house, which is completely unreasonable." She later apologised for the comments.

From September 2022 to April 2024, she presented the weekday drivetime show on Talkradio and TalkTV. In May 2024, it was announced Feltz had signed to present a 3pm–6pm show on Saturdays on LBC. In November of the same year, it was announced that Feltz would also present on Sundays from 3pm to 6pm on the same station.

In 2023, Feltz appeared on E4 reality series Celebs Go Dating, following her split from her partner of 17 years. In May 2024, she appeared on Late Night Lycett as a wrestling commentator for a Kamikaze Pro wrestling event. At the end of the show, she wrestled Man Like Dereiss, pinning him to win her debut match. In March 2025, Feltz began hosting a rebooted version of Vanessa on Channel 5, as a daytime talk show spin-off of Jeremy Vine, and was advertised as an alternative to ITV daytime talk show Loose Women. On 18 June 2026, it was reported that the series had been axed by Channel 5 due to poor viewership ratings and a failure to stop repeated prank callers. 5 confirmed that they would take back the slot once the second series ends its run. In August 2026, Feltz launched a new show on YouTube titled At Home with Vanessa.

== Personal life ==
Feltz married surgeon Michael Kurer in March 1985; they divorced in 2000. Feltz has two daughters from her marriage to Kurer, and four grandchildren. Her elder daughter is Allegra Benitah, a former tax lawyer who worked as a television baker and chef. Her younger daughter is Saskia Joss, a child therapist with whom she co-hosts a podcast Help! My Child's Anxious and who regularly appears on her talk show.

In December 2006, Feltz became engaged to singer Ben Ofoedu at the Clarence Hotel in Dublin. They originally planned to marry the following year and remained together and engaged until splitting in February 2023.

Feltz lives in St John's Wood, London, in a house which was previously owned by Charles Saatchi, and which was featured in Sir John Betjeman's documentary Metro‑Land (1973). In 2017, she bought a holiday home in Ballycotton in east Cork.

Throughout her career, Feltz has been the subject of tabloid scrutiny for her weight, and was referred to as the "woman who ate her audience" by the media. She underwent a gastric band operation in 2010, before having it removed in 2019 after it became embedded in her liver. The same year, she underwent gastric bypass surgery and lost a significant amount of weight.

== Filmography ==
=== Television ===
As herself
Year	Title	Notes	Ref.
1994–1998, 2025–2026	Vanessa	Presenter	
1995–2001	Value for Money	Presenter	
1996–1998	The Big Breakfast	Presenter	
1999, 2011	The Vanessa Show	Presenter	
2001	Celebrity Big Brother	Housemate; series 1	
2003–2005	The Wright Stuff	Panellist; contributor	
2004	Celebrity Fit Club	Participant	
2004	Little Britain	Guest; 1 episode	
2006	Vanessa's Real Lives	Presenter	
2006–2025	This Morning	Contributor; presenter; agony aunt	
2010	Ultimate Big Brother	Housemate	
2013	Strictly Come Dancing	Contestant; series 11	
2023	Celebs Go Dating	Cast member	

=== Radio ===
Year	Title	Role	Slot	Station	Ref.
2001–2022	Vanessa Feltz	Presenter	09:00–12:00 (2005–2015); 07:00–10:00 (2016–2022)	BBC Radio 94.9	
2011–2022	Early Breakfast Show	Presenter	05:00–06:30 (2011–2021); 04:00–6:30 (2021–2022)	BBC Radio 2	
2022–2024	Weekday Drivetime	Presenter	4pm–7pm weekdays	Talkradio/TalkTV	
2024–present	Vanessa Feltz	Presenter	15:00–18:00 Saturdays	LBC	

== Awards and nominations ==
Year	Ceremony	Award	Work	Result	Ref.
1995	1st National Television Awards	Most Popular Talk Show	Vanessa	Nominated	
2009	Radio Academy Awards	Speech Radio Personality of the Year	BBC Radio 94.9	Won	
2011	Stonewall Awards	Journalist of the Year	—N/a	Won	
2025	National Reality Television Awards	Best Talk Show	Vanessa	Won	
2025	Variety Legends of Industry Awards	Legend of Broadcasting	—N/a	Won	
2025	MBCC Awards	Honorary Inspirational Women's Champion	—N/a	Won	
