= Danny Blue (comedian) =

English comedian

- Born: 2 January 1949 (age 77); London, England
- Occupations: Comedian, actor, television and radio personality
- Television: The Big Questions, 100% English, Kilroy, News Night

Danny Blue is an English comedian, television presenter, media personality and charity fundraiser. His stand-up act is mainly aimed at an adult audience, with adult material; however, his television work has proven he is just at home with a mixed audience. It was during his touring of the club circuit that he was spotted and given the opportunity to appear on television programmes such as The Des O'Connor Show, The James Whale Show, and The Big Breakfast. Danny also appeared on Sextasy with his comedy show The Oddballs.

Blue was a pupil at Fircroft infants school, Sellincourt Junior school, Franciscan School Senior and Hillcroft Secondary modern, all in Tooting, London. On 24 February 1991 Blue appeared at The London Palladium introduced by John Inman. Since then Danny has appeared in EastEnders, Taggart, The Des O'Connor Show, BBC's cop Drama Backup, Kevin Whately's Brokers Man and more infamously his appearances over 10 years in Jim Davidson's Sinderella.

Over the past 15 years Blue has appeared in most of Dave Lee's Happy Holidays shows at the Marlowe Theatre in Canterbury. Along with Dave Lee a host of stars appear including Jim Davidson, Jethro, Johnny Casson, Bradley Walsh, The Drifters, The Oddballs, Toyah Willcox, Brian Conley, Barbara Windsor, June Brown among others.

Throughout Blue's career, he has been featured in many television programs and documentaries not only in the UK but Australia, Scandinavia, and most of Europe. In 1995 Danny was asked to play a comedian in the Greek blockbuster movie The Love Path for Olympic Films.

== Career ==
Blue has had a long theatre presence, both in London's West End and touring nationally across the UK. He has also appeared in British television shows including, EastEnders, Taggart, The Broker's Man and Backup.

Blue is the founding member of the Comedy Act "The Oddballs" which has seen him tour the world presenting the visual act to countries who may not understand English and his stand-up routine. In 1995 his act was seen by thousands on a busy theatre tour headlined by Jim Davidson. They performed along fellow comedians Charlie Drake, Jess Conrad, Dave Lee, Roger Kitter, Dave Kristian and Mia Carla.

== Television ==
- EastEnders (BBC) – played a Spencer Brother at Bianca's hen party in the Queen Vic
- Taggart (ITV) – Played a comedy artiste "Sweet Muffins" with his comedy show The Oddballs
- The Des O'Connor Show (ITV) – Guest on show with Norman Collier, Engelbert Humperdinck, Jill Gascoine, Matt Bianco and The Oddballs
- Backup – BBC police drama set in Birmingham. Played comedy spot at Police Ball.
- The Broker's Man – (BBC) – Starring Kevin Whately. Drama series about an ex-policeman, who now uses his detective skills while working for insurance companies. Played comedy artiste at cabaret dinner
- The Salon – Reality show – played himself
- Trisha – Special Guest – Chat show – played himself
- James Whale Show – Guest – Chat Show – played himself
- Vanessa – Guest – Chat show – Played himself
- The Warehouse – Chat show – with Debbie McGee – played himself

== Politics ==
He stood on numerous elections as a member of the Official Monster Raving Loony Party during the leadership of Screaming Lord Sutch. Blue holds the record for the most votes (3,339) for the party achieved during the 1994 European Elections under the pseudonym of "John Major".
