= Daniel Blue =

Daniel Blue may refer to:

- Daniel Blue (church administrator) (1796–1884), founder of the Saint Andrews African Methodist Episcopal Church in Sacramento, California
- Daniel T. Blue, Jr. (born 1949), Democratic Representative for North Carolina
- Danny Blue (comedian) (born 1949), British comedian
- Danny Blue (Hustle), fictional character from TV series Hustle
