= 1st National Television Awards =

British awards ceremony in 1995

- Date: 30 August 1995
- Location: Wembley Conference Centre, London
- Country: United Kingdom
- Presented by: Various
- Hosted by: Eamonn Holmes
- Website: http://www.nationaltvawards.com/

Television/radio coverage
- Network: ITV

The 1st National Television Awards ceremony was held at the Wembley Conference Centre on 30 August 1995 and was hosted by Eamonn Holmes.

== Awards ==
Category	Winner	Also nominated
Most Popular Actor	Robson Green (Soldier Soldier)	Ross Kemp (EastEnders); Robbie Coltrane (Cracker); David Jason (A Touch of Frost); Nick Berry (Heartbeat)
Most Popular Actress	Anna Friel (Brookside)	Helen Mirren (Prime Suspect); Julie Goodyear (Coronation Street); Letitia Dean (EastEnders); Melissa George (Home and Away)
Most Popular Drama Programme	Soldier Soldier (ITV)	Casualty (BBC1); Band of Gold (ITV); Heartbeat (ITV)
Most Popular Serial Drama	Coronation Street (ITV)	EastEnders (BBC1); Emmerdale (ITV); Brookside (Channel 4); Home and Away (ITV/Seven Network); Neighbours (BBC1/Network Ten)
Most Popular Talk Show	Des O'Connor Tonight (ITV)	The Oprah Winfrey Show (BBC2/Syndicated); The Clive James Show (ITV); Vanessa (BBC1)
Most Popular Entertainment Presenter	Michael Barrymore	Noel Edmonds; Shane Richie; Chris Evans
Most Popular Factual Entertainment Show	Animal Hospital (BBC1)	The Big Breakfast (Channel 4); Antiques Roadshow (BBC1); This Morning (ITV)
Most Popular Quiz Programme	Strike It Lucky (ITV)	Big Break (BBC1); Play Your Cards Right (ITV); Have I Got News For You (BBC2)
Most Popular Comedy Programme	Men Behaving Badly (BBC1)	Mr. Bean (ITV); Absolutely Fabulous (BBC1); Birds of a Feather (BBC1)
Most Popular Comedy Performer	Brian Conley	Rowan Atkinson; Joanna Lumley; Richard Wilson
Most Popular Newcomer	Angela Griffin (Coronation Street)	Jacqueline Pirie (Emmerdale); Ian Kelsey (Emmerdale); Patsy Palmer (EastEnders)
The Top Young People's Programme	Top of the Pops (BBC1)	Lois & Clark: The New Adventures of Superman (BBC1/ABC); All New Baywatch (ITV/Syndicated); Byker Grove (BBC1); The Crystal Maze (Channel 4)
Most Popular Family Programme	Barrymore (ITV)	Gladiators (ITV); The Brian Conley Show (ITV); Noel's House Party (BBC1)
Special Recognition Award	Julie Goodyear	
