= Des O'Connor =

English comedian, singer and television presenter (1932–2020)

Des O'Connor CBE
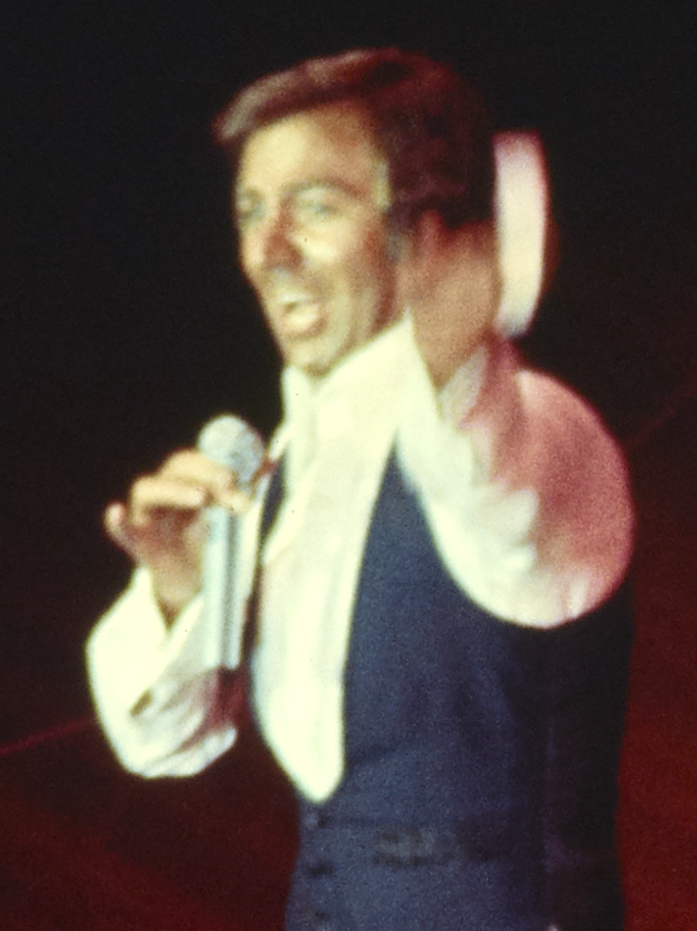
- O'Connor performing in 1974
- Born: Desmond Bernard O'Connor; 12 January 1932; Stepney, London, England
- Died: 14 November 2020 (aged 88); Slough, Berkshire, England
- Occupations: Broadcaster; musician; comedian
- Years active: 1954–2019
- Television: The Des O'Connor Show (1963–1973); Des O'Connor Entertains (1974–1976); Des O'Connor Tonight (1977–2002); Take Your Pick (1992–1999); Today with Des and Mel (2002–2006); Countdown (2007–2008)
- Spouses: Phyllis Gill (m. 1953; div. 1959) Gillian Vaughan (m. 1960; div. 1982) Jay Rufer (m. 1985; div. 1990) Jodie Brooke Wilson (m. 2007)
- Children: 5

Desmond Bernard O'Connor (12 January 1932 – 14 November 2020) was an English comedian, singer and television presenter.

He was a long-time TV chat-show host, beginning with The Des O'Connor Show in 1963, which ran for ten years as well as the lunchtime chat show Today with Des and Mel from 2002 to 2006 with Melanie Sykes. He also presented several UK television game shows, including Take Your Pick! from 1992 to 1999, and the long-running Channel 4 game show Countdown for two years between 2007 and 2008.

O'Connor recorded 36 albums and had four top-ten UK singles, including a number-one hit with "I Pretend", with global sales of more than sixteen million records. Well known for his friendship with comedians Morecambe and Wise, his singing ability was often light-heartedly mocked on their show, with O'Connor taking part in the sketches.

== Early life ==
Desmond Bernard O'Connor was born on 12 January 1932 in Stepney, East London, to Maude (née Bassett), a cleaner, and Harry O'Connor, a dustman. His father was of Irish Catholic descent and his mother was Jewish, and he joked that he was the first O'Connor to have a bar mitzvah.

In his childhood, he had rickets and was later badly injured in a hit-and-run car accident which meant he had to be in an iron lung for six months. He had a brother and a sister. He was evacuated to Northampton during the Second World War, where he worked in a shoe factory and was a schoolboy and reserves football player with Northampton Town.

After completing his national service in the Royal Air Force, he worked as a Redcoat at Butlin's holiday camp in Filey, where he met his first wife Phyllis, and as a shoe salesman at Church's in Northampton, and for the bus company United Counties, both on the road and in the office, before entering show business. Prior to his break on television, his first fully professional stage appearance in variety was in a Newcastle theatre. Later, while in Leeds, he invited the Welsh singer Shirley Bassey out on two dates. In 1958, when Buddy Holly toured the UK, O'Connor was the show's compère for which he was paid £100 per week.

In 1950 and 1952, he collaborated in songwriting with British singer Sam Browne and Australian pianist and composer Ray Hartley. The team produced hit songs "Let's Do It Again", "Start Singing A Song", "Yes! Yes! Yes! (I Like Good Old Melody)" and "Why Do I Love You?". O'Connor and Hartley also created the hit song "My Baby Told Me She Loves Me".

== Career ==
=== Stage ===
O'Connor appeared at the Glasgow Empire, MGM Grand, Las Vegas, the Opera House, Sydney, and the O'Keefe Centre, Toronto, and made more than one thousand solo appearances at the London Palladium.

In late 2011, O'Connor starred in Dreamboats and Petticoats at the Playhouse Theatre.

In May 2012, O'Connor replaced Russell Grant in the West End musical, The Wizard of Oz, at the London Palladium, as Professor Marvel, Doorman at the Emerald City, Tour Guide, and The Wizard.

In October 2015, O'Connor and Jimmy Tarbuck starred in their own one-off show at the London Palladium to raise money for the new Royal Variety Charity. Due to the success of this show, they toured the country in 2016 from April to October. The venues they visited were (in chronological order), the Southampton Mayflower Theatre, Leeds Grand Theatre, Southend Cliffs Pavilion, Bristol Hippodrome, Bournemouth International Centre, and Milton Keynes Theatre.

In 2017, O'Connor and Tarbuck toured the UK again from May to December. The venues they visited included Theatre Royal, Norwich, Wolverhampton Grand Theatre, Blackpool Opera House, Princess Theatre, Torquay, The Hexagon, Reading, Theatre Royal, Newcastle and Grand Theatre, Swansea.

Until 2019, O'Connor toured theatres around the UK with his one-man show.

=== Television ===
O'Connor starred in mainstream television shows in almost every year from 1963 until the 2000s, a feat that only one other television personality has achieved worldwide (U.S. game show host Bob Barker, who hosted mainstream television shows from 1956 until 2007, with 1966–1972 being in syndication).

- Between 1963 and 1971 O'Connor hosted The Des O'Connor Show, a British variety show, for eight series on ITV. This was followed by Des O'Connor Entertains, a show which ran for two series between 1974 and 1976 and featured singing, dancing, and comedy sketches. In 1969, thirteen editions of the show were sold to NBC in the United States, as a summer replacement for the network's Kraft Music Hall. The series was broadcast in more than forty countries.
- Between 1977 and 2002, O'Connor presented his own chat show series entitled Des O'Connor Tonight which lasted for seven series on BBC Two and later seventeen on ITV.
- From 1992 to 1998 O'Connor presented the game show Take Your Pick! where he met fourth wife Jodie Wilson. In 1995 and 1997 O'Connor compèred the Royal Variety Performance.
- In January 2001 ITV aired An Audience with Des O'Connor.
- From 2002 to 2006 O'Connor co-hosted Today with Des and Mel opposite Melanie Sykes. The show was a lunchtime light entertainment programme aired on ITV. On 12 May 2006, the channel announced that the show would be one of a number to be axed in a "painful, but utterly necessary" move.
- In January 2007, O'Connor replaced Des Lynam as co-presenter of the Channel 4 game show Countdown with Carol Vorderman. He left the show in 2008 to spend more time on theatre and entertainment-based projects. In 2009, O'Connor was replaced by sports presenter Jeff Stelling.
- In April 2012, ITV aired The One and Only Des O'Connor, a one-off show that celebrated O'Connor's 80th birthday, with guests including Katherine Kelly, Olly Murs, Robert Lindsay, and Melanie Sykes.

==== Guest appearances ====
- O'Connor appeared as a guest on The Morecambe and Wise Show a number of times. He was the butt of many a joke by Eric Morecambe, being referred to as "Des – short for 'desperate", and "Death O'Connor". One line, sung to the tune of "Crazy Words – Crazy Tune" was, "Roses are red, violets are blue, Des can't sing, we know that's true!". (O'Connor was actually an old friend of the duo, and even participated in writing many of the "put-downs".)
- In May 2012, O'Connor took part in the TV game show Would I Lie to You?.
- In December 2012, O'Connor was invited to celebrate 100 years of the Royal Variety Performance with Bruce Forsyth, Ronnie Corbett, and Jimmy Tarbuck.
- In December 2012, O'Connor partnered Lee Mack in a celebrity edition of Who Wants to Be a Millionaire?.
- In December 2013, O'Connor appeared in a celebrity edition of The Chase.
- In October 2014, O'Connor was a panellist on an episode of Through the Keyhole.
- In April 2017, O'Connor was on the panel of Harry Hill's Alien Fun Capsule.

=== Singing ===
O'Connor had a successful career as a singer, recording 36 albums, five of which reached the top 40 of the UK Albums Chart. O'Connor appeared with Morecambe and Wise on several of their Christmas shows. He worked with many pop stars, including Adam Faith, Shirley Bassey, Barbra Streisand and Cilla Black. He toured with Buddy Holly (during Holly's 1958 stay in the UK) and Jason Donovan.

He recorded four top 10 singles, including "I Pretend", which topped the UK Singles Chart in 1968, and "The Skye Boat Song", a 1986 duet with Roger Whittaker.

His singing ability was often parodied on The Morecambe & Wise Show, with O'Connor taking part in the sketches.

== Awards and honours ==
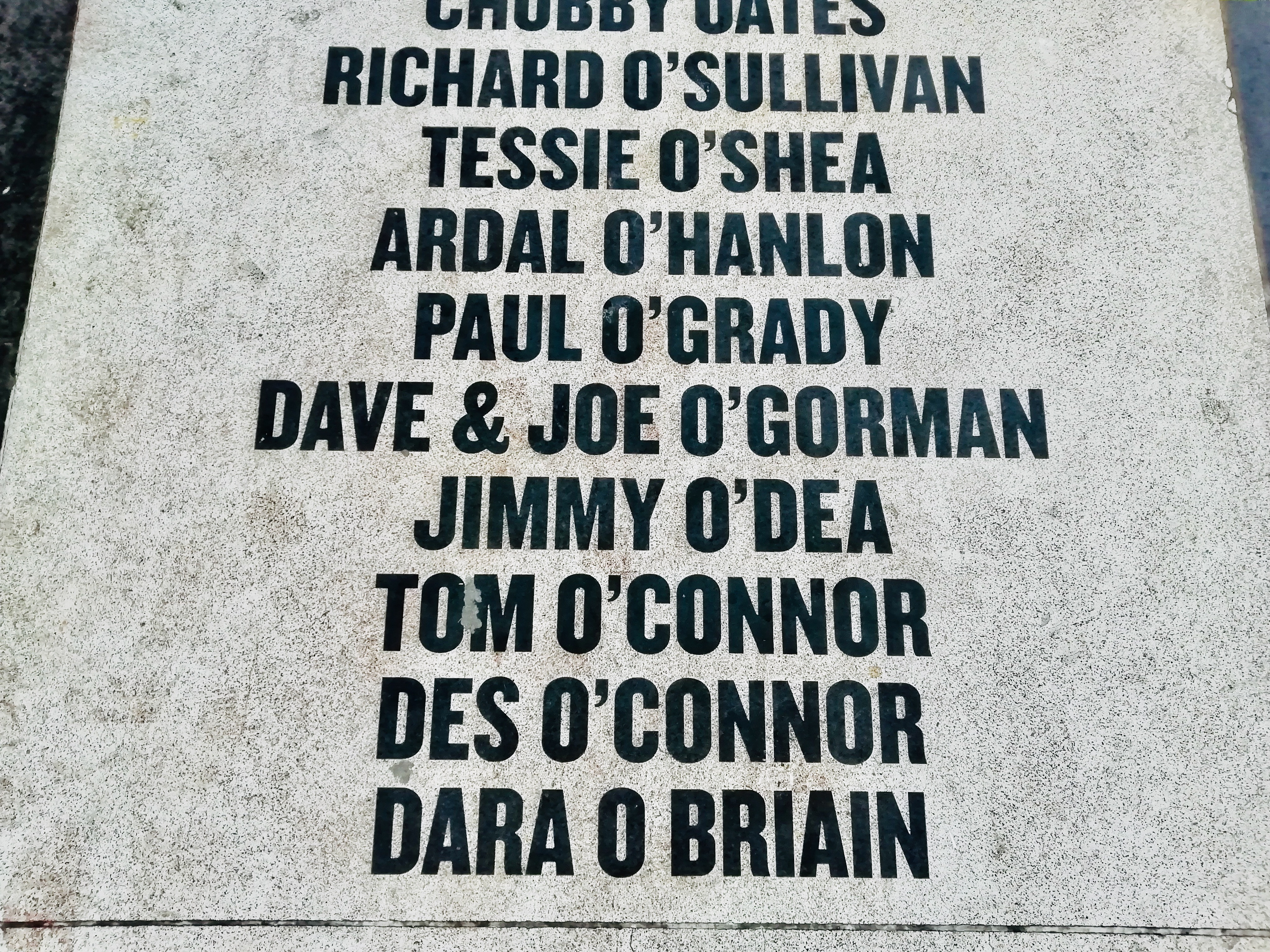
Des O'Connor on the Blackpool Walk of Fame Comedy Carpet, 2022

O'Connor was the first subject of the second incarnation of the long-running television programme This Is Your Life, when the show returned to screens after a five-year absence, produced by Thames Television. He was surprised live on the stage of the London Palladium by Eamonn Andrews in November 1969.

In 2001, O'Connor was presented with the Special Recognition Award at the National Television Awards for his contribution to television.

In 2002, his autobiography, Bananas Can't Fly!, was published.

He was appointed Commander of the Order of the British Empire (CBE) in the 2008 Birthday Honours.

A month after his death, ITV aired a tribute, titled Des O'Connor: The Ultimate Entertainer, on 13 December 2020.

== Personal life ==
O'Connor was married four times:

- Phyllis Gill (married 1953, divorced 1959; one daughter)
- Gillian Vaughan (married 1962, divorced 1982; two daughters)
- Jay Rufer (married 1985, divorced 1990, one daughter)
- Jodie Brooke Wilson (married September 2007; one son)

== Death ==
On 14 November 2020, O'Connor died in his sleep at Wexham Park Hospital in Slough, aged 88, following a fall at his home in Gerrards Cross, Buckinghamshire, a week earlier. In a January 2021 interview, his widow Jodie revealed that in 2017 he had been diagnosed with Parkinson's disease, although he thought that he had suffered from effects of it for a few years previously. The episode of Countdown broadcast on 16 November 2020 was dedicated to his memory.

== Selected discography ==
=== Albums ===
Year	Album			
Year	Album	UK	AUS	IRE
1968	I Pretend	8	—	—
1970	With Love	40	—	—
1972	Sing a Favourite Song	25	—	—
1974	Remember	—	73	—
1978	Another Side	—	—	—
1980	Just for You	17	—	—
1984	Des O'Connor Now	24	—	—
1992	Portrait	63	—	—
2001	A Tribute to the Crooners	51	—	—
2008	Inspired	51	—	—

=== Compilation albums ===
Year	Album	
Year	Album	AUS
1979	Just for You – 20 Special Songs	—
1980	Remember Romance – 20 Great Love Songs	65
1984	Now – 16 Classic Songs	65

=== Singles ===
Year	Single	Chart positions			
Year	Single	UK	AUS	IRE	Can AC
1967	"Careless Hands"	6	—	—	—
1968	"I Pretend"	1	—	1	—
1968	"1–2–3 O'Leary"	4	—	—	—
1969	"Dick-A-Dum-Dum"	14	—	—	—
1969	"Loneliness"	18	—	—	—
1970	"I'll Go on Hoping"	30	—	—	—
1970	"The Tip of My Fingers"	15	—	—	—
1972	"Don't Let the Good Life Pass You By"	—	77	—	—
1973	"Remember"	—	19	—	—
1974	"My Sentimental Friend"	—	100	—	—
1975	"Feelings"	—	—	—	—
1975	"Three Times a Lady"	—	—	—	—
1986	"The Skye Boat Song"	10	96	—	16
1988	"Neighbours"	100	—	—	—
