= I Pretend =

Single by Des O'Connor
- B-side: "Thinking of You"
- Released: 1968
- Genre: Easy listening; pop
- Length: 2:49
- Label: Columbia
- Songwriter(s): Barry Mason and Les Reed
- Producer(s): Norman Newell

"I Pretend" is a song written by Barry Mason and Les Reed and recorded by Des O'Connor. O'Connor's recording of the song became a number-one hit in the UK and Ireland in 1968.

== Background ==
Les Reed was in Wessex Studios and had just finished a session with Quincy Jones when he met O'Connor coming into the studio to record a jingle. O'Connor asked Reed and Barry Mason write a song for him, which the duo complied and wrote "I Pretend" in an hour. They gave the song to O'Connor, who then asked Geoff Love to arrange the song so he could record it in two days' time.

The song was released and it reached No. 1 on the UK Singles Chart in July 1968. His recording was released in the United States on Diamond Records; however, it failed to chart.

== Charts ==
| Chart (1968) | Peak position |
|---|---|
| Ireland (IRMA) | 1 |
| UK Singles (OCC) | 1 |

== Cover versions ==
- The only version of the song to chart in the United States was by Mel Carter, whose cover reached No. 38 on the Easy Listening chart in the autumn of 1968.
