= Jungle Run =

British children's television series

- Genre: Children's game show
- Created by: Lesley Oakden
- Presented by: Dominic Wood; Chris Jarvis; Michael Underwood
- Country of origin: United Kingdom
- Original language: English
- No. of series: 8
- No. of episodes: 99

Production
- Production locations: RAF Finningley (1999–2000); RAF Newton (2001–2006)
- Running time: 25 minutes
- Production company: Yorkshire Television

Original release
- Network: ITV (CITV)
- Release: 10 September 1999 – 29 November 2006

Related
- Fort Boyard; The Crystal Maze; Naked Jungle

Jungle Run is a British children's television game show produced by Granada Kids. The programme aired on CITV as part of the ITV network from 10 September 1999 to 29 November 2006.

It is similar to shows such as Fort Boyard and The Crystal Maze. The show has had three presenters, referred to as the "Jungle Guide": Dominic Wood from 1999 to 2000, Chris Jarvis from 2001 to 2002 and Michael Underwood from 2003 to 2006.

Similarly to The Crystal Maze, the set was constructed inside an adapted aircraft hangar. The Wood era of the show was filmed at the disused air base RAF Finningley near Doncaster; the Jarvis and Underwood series' were filmed at RAF Newton near Nottingham, sharing production space with the later original series run of Robot Wars.

== Format ==
A team of children come upon a mythical jungle ruled by the Jungle King, where the goal is to win treasure from the Temple of the Jungle King. On their way they compete in 5 challenges (3 or 4 in celebrity editions) to win time inside the temple to better their chance of winning the top prize. In the first 2 series, bananas win them time in the final challenge. However, from series 3 onward, these are replaced with silver monkey statues, each one giving them 10 seconds in the final challenge. There was also one golden banana worth 50 bananas, later replaced with a ruby monkey worth 20 seconds, in each episode, with the total amount of possible time standing at 3:20.

== Gameplay ==
Challenges took place in a variety of locations. Some were swamps or waterfalls; others were obstacle courses or mazes, and some were just places out in the open. The same location could be used for multiple challenges, but each task could only be played in one place.

Usually, 100 bananas or four to five statues were available in each of the challenges. Occasionally, members of the team could be trapped by running out of time in an obstacle course or failing to complete a game involving cages; the rest of the team would then decide if they wanted to forfeit 50 bananas/one (later two) statues to release them, or leave without them and lose no time. If multiple team members are trapped in the same game, one team member can be released for free while each additional team member must be bought out to be released. In some games, Sid and Elvis (a pair of monkeys loyal to the jungle king) would try to distract contestants by throwing coconuts or other objects in their direction.

Games took approximately two to three minutes each, and included challenges such as:

- Capturing statues while going down a zipwire.
- Discovering bananas/statues in a maze or obstacle course; usually one member of the team would complete the course while others would provide assistance by using tools on the other side of the wall, or provision of guidance from above.
- Collecting bananas/statues hanging above a swamp, using lilypads or a bridge.
- Climbing up a wall and collecting bananas/statues hidden in ridges.
- Diving underwater to get statues hidden in treasure chests.
- Filling shrines with water, so statues would float within reach.
- Using bamboo poles to hook baskets containing statues.
- Finding and using a series of keys to unlock cages where contestants were imprisoned. (Statues were released by using the same keys in a machine.)
- Remembering pairs of symbols on a board, and matching the symbols to win bananas/statues.

=== The Temple of the Jungle King ===
The final challenge involves contestants making their way through the Temple of the Jungle King, their time inside depending on the number of bananas/statues collected. Inside the temple is a series of chambers, each containing a challenge, the completion of which rewarded the team with a large monkey-shaped sacred idol that stood in each subsequent chamber. Once the challenge in each chamber is completed, the door to the next room opens. In series 1–2, teams would only win one prize based on the chamber they advanced to, but following this, teams won one prize per chamber completed. There were four challenges and one sacred idol for each completed chamber: Wooden (phased out after series 2), Stone, Metal/Bronze, Silver and the Golden Monkey. In the 2003 Christmas special, these were replaced with large present sacks.

When a team has only 10/20 seconds left, a warning sound (a gong, a drum, or a chimp screaming) would be heard, signalling that they should make their way out of the temple. If some members or the entire team fail to get out in time, those people are locked in the temple and receive no prizes. In series 1–2 if anyone got trapped, even those who did get out with an idol received no prizes, but from series 3 onwards, anyone who made it out with an idol would win the prize. Anyone who took part would also receive a consolation prize, such as a t-shirt, backpack or monkey toy (depending on the series). When celebrities played their prizes are given to charity.

Challenges could involve:

- Getting a ball in a hole by lifting up and rotating a maze.
- Completing a jigsaw.
- Each contestant matching their hands and feet to the correct symbols.
- Solving an abacus puzzle.
- Turning cogs.
- Getting across a pit without touching the sand.
- Spelling the solution to a riddle by standing on the right tiles.

== Transmissions ==
Series	Start date	End date	Episodes	Host
1	10 September 1999	15 December 1999	13	Dominic Wood
2	6 September 2000	6 December 2000	13	Dominic Wood
3	22 October 2001	2 November 2001	10	Chris Jarvis
4	3 September 2002	5 November 2002	10	Chris Jarvis
5	9 September 2003	9 December 2003	14	Michael Underwood
6	7 September 2004	30 November 2004	13	Michael Underwood
7	27 September 2005	20 December 2005	13	Michael Underwood
8	18 October 2006	29 November 2006	13	Michael Underwood

== Legacy ==
In 2000, the set for Jungle Run was used for the Channel 5 television programme Naked Jungle.
