= The Vanessa Show =

1999 British television series

- Genre: Tabloid talk show
- Presented by: Vanessa Feltz
- Country of origin: United Kingdom
- Original language: English

Production
- Running time: 45–90 minutes

Original release
- Network: BBC One
- Release: 4 January – 23 July 1999

Related
- Vanessa (1994–1998)

The Vanessa Show is a British chat show presented by Vanessa Feltz which was broadcast on BBC One from January to July 1999. It was cancelled following a scandal revealed by the Daily Mirror newspaper, in which the programme was found to have used paid actors as guests. The format was similar to that of Vanessa, Feltz's previous daytime show that ran on ITV from 1994 to 1998.

An edition of the show, broadcast on 10 March, was interrupted by a male streaker. This occurred during an interview with Alvin Hall, presenter of BBC Two's personal finance show Your Money or Your Life. The lads' magazine Front later claims responsibility for the stunt.

== Background ==
Feltz previously presented the ITV daytime television chat show Vanessa from 1994 to 1998, before moving to the BBC in a deal believed to be worth between £1 million and around £2 million. Vanessa was replaced by Trisha shortly after airing.

== Scandal and cancellation ==
In February 1999, one month after the show's premiere, it was reported by the Daily Mirror that at least three guests on the programme were actors recruited from an entertainment agency, and that their personal lives discussed on the show were fabricated. The programme's ratings declined as a result, and the BBC shortened it from 90 minutes to 75, then 45. On 9 June, BBC One Controller Peter Salmon announced that the show had been cancelled. The final episodes were broadcast in the July.

== Channel 5 version ==
In January 2011, Feltz started hosting a new programme (with the same title) on Channel 5. The show, which received poor ratings and was later moved to an afternoon slot, was different in format and style. It featured a mix of celebrity interviews, news items and debate around a range of issues. A second series, initially planned to commence in September 2011 after ratings improved, never went ahead.
