= Des O'Connor Tonight =

British entertainment television series

- Genre: Comedy, talk show
- Presented by: Des O'Connor
- Country of origin: United Kingdom
- Original language: English
- No. of series: 6 (BBC2); 17 (ITV)
- No. of episodes: 44 (BBC2); 182 (ITV)

Production
- Production location: Teddington Studios (ITV)
- Running time: 30–60 minutes
- Production companies: BBC (1977–1982); Thames Television (1983–1992); Talkback (1983–2002); Central (1993–1998)

Original release
- Network: BBC2
- Release: 17 October 1977 – 20 December 1982
- Network: ITV
- Release: 1 November 1983 – 24 December 2002

Related
- The Des O'Connor Show

Des O'Connor Tonight is a British light entertainment variety show hosted by Des O'Connor. It was originally broadcast on BBC2 from 1977 until 1982, when it moved to ITV from 1 November 1983 until 3 September 1999. Six further specials were broadcast until 24 December 2002 when it was axed after nearly 26 years.

== Transmissions ==
=== Series ===
Series	Start date	End date	Episodes
BBC2
1	17 October 1977	21 November 1977	6
2	18 September 1978	6 November 1978	8
3	14 January 1980	18 February 1980	6
4	27 October 1980	15 December 1980	8
5	29 September 1981	16 November 1981	8
6	1 November 1982	20 December 1982	8
ITV
7	1 November 1983	3 January 1984	9
8	11 September 1984	25 December 1984	12
9	8 October 1985	31 December 1985	13
10	14 October 1986	30 December 1986	12
11	21 October 1987	6 January 1988	12
12	26 October 1988	28 December 1988	10
13	25 October 1989	27 December 1989	10
14	31 October 1990	9 January 1991	10
15	16 October 1991	15 January 1992	11
16	7 October 1992	30 December 1992	10
17	17 November 1993	9 February 1994	12
18	30 November 1994	8 February 1995	10
19	13 December 1995	7 February 1996	8
20	11 December 1996	12 February 1997	10
21	3 December 1997	8 April 1998	10
22	11 September 1998	23 December 1998	10
23	2 July 1999	3 September 1999	10

=== Specials ===
Date	Entitle
13 March 1996	Special
5 August 1998	Special
27 December 1999	Christmas Special
28 December 2000	Christmas Special
24 December 2001	Christmas Special
31 December 2001	New Year Special
6 April 2002	Cliff Richard Special
24 December 2002	Christmas Special
