= Vanessa (British TV series) =

British daytime talk show

- Title card from the 2025 revival
- Genre: Tabloid talk show (1994–1998); Talk show, News programme (2025–2026)
- Presented by: Vanessa Feltz
- Country of origin: United Kingdom
- Original language: English

Production
- Running time: 30 minutes (1994–1998); 60–70 minutes (2025–2026) (inc. advertisements)
- Production companies: Anglia in association with Multimedia Enterprises (1994–1998); ITN Productions (2025–2026)

Original release
- Network: ITV
- Release: 13 May 1994 – 18 September 1998
- Network: 5
- Release: 24 March 2025 – 17 July 2026

Related
- The Vanessa Show; Jeremy Vine

Vanessa is a British daytime talk show presented by British broadcaster Vanessa Feltz. The show was originally broadcast on ITV from 13 May 1994 to 18 September 1998. The programme was relaunched as a current affairs programme on 5 between 24 March 2025 and 17 July 2026.

On 18 June 2026, after struggling with persistent prank callers and low ratings, it was announced that the show would not be renewed as part of changes to the afternoon schedule. The final episode aired on 17 July 2026.

== History ==
Vanessa launched on ITV on 13 May 1994, and featured guests and a studio audience, of which Feltz would often discuss and attempt to resolve their issues. In August 1998, it was reported that Feltz had been sacked by Anglia because of her "unreal" demands to have her wages doubled to £2.75 million. Feltz also wanted the show's production base moved from Ipswich to London and to front more prime-time shows. The programme aired its final episode on ITV on 18 September 1998, with Feltz moving to the BBC the following year where she presented The Vanessa Show, a prime-time morning show following a similar format, Vanessa was subsequently replaced by Trisha shortly after airing. In 2006, Feltz returned to ITV as the host of a new talk show called Vanessa's Real Lives which was produced by Endemol's Brighter Pictures and ran for only one series.

In 2025, following Feltz's announcement of her departure from her role on ITV morning talk show This Morning, she joined ITN Productions to host a Channel 5 daytime talk show spin-off of Jeremy Vine, which was advertised as an alternative to ITV daytime talk show Loose Women. The series was launched in March 2025, initially airing from 12:30 pm to 1:40 pm. The set initially consisted of pink furniture and graphics. Unlike the original series, the show does not feature a studio audience and Feltz is usually joined by three celebrity panellists. Feltz introduces three current affairs topics at the head of show and takes phone-ins from the public. In July 2025, the programme won the award for Best Talk Show at the National Reality Television Awards. In August 2025, its run was extended to "eight months at least" by Channel 5. The broadcaster was reportedly thinking of ways to "revamp" the programme to attract more viewers. The show received a set overhaul with the pink theme being replaced with new yellow graphics and a toned down set. Since January 2026, the programme has run from 2 pm to 3 pm. This also saw a further set and graphics change, with Feltz sitting behind a desk instead of on a sofa.

In February 2026, the programme began receiving a number of prank phone calls, with callers impersonating various celebrities including Kim Woodburn and Lauren Harries, as well as several characters from the BBC soap opera EastEnders including Bea Pollard, Julie Bates, Sandra Goodwin, Zoe Slater, Nicola Mitchell, Mo Harris and Elaine Peacock, reciting storylines from the soap opera and pretending they were genuine callers, as well as slipping in British pop culture references from social media and television shows. Another occasion saw two callers phone in whilst Nicola McLean was a panellist, one of whom impersonated Woodburn and another who branded her a "bitch" for her treatment of Woodburn during their appearance on the nineteenth series of Celebrity Big Brother. In May 2026, whilst Cherry Healey was guest presenting the show and Amelle Berrabah was a panellist, a caller phoned in reciting the lyrics of "Get Sexy" by Berrabah's former group Sugababes, before singing their song "About a Girl". Both Berrabah and Healey were amused by the call. In June 2026, a caller phoned in impersonating Jill Tyrell, a character portrayed by Julia Davis in Nighty Night. Later that month, it was announced that the show had been axed by 5, with reports citing the persistent prank calls and low viewing figures as the reason, with the final episode airing on 17 July 2026.

== Awards and nominations ==
Year	Organisation	Category	Result	Ref.
1995	1st National Television Awards	Most Popular Talk Show	Nominated	
2025	National Reality Television Awards	Best Talk Show	Won	
