= Jacky Rowland =

British broadcast journalist

- Occupation: Journalist
- Known for: BBC foreign correspondent – Afghanistan & Kosovo, 2001 news event award, Royal Television Society; Al Jazeera English correspondent in Jerusalem & Europe – Outstanding Contribution to Broadcasting, 2011 International Media Awards

Jacky Rowland is a former broadcast journalist. She was formerly a foreign correspondent with the BBC and a Senior Correspondent for Al Jazeera English. She has won awards for her reporting for both broadcasters.

== Career ==
I really don't understand all the brouhaha about 'female war correspondents' this time round. I mean, haven't we already been there, done that? I remember 10 years ago, with Afghanistan after 9/11, all the magazines and newspapers were doing stories about women war correspondents. I was interviewed by Vanity Fair and various British newspapers. And now, it's like the woman war correspondent has only just been invented!

— Jacky Rowland, 2011

=== BBC ===
Rowland first joined the BBC as a graduate trainee in 1989, and joined the BBC World Service in 1991 as the North Africa correspondent. Rowland was a foreign correspondent for the BBC, during which time she was one of the first Western journalists to travel to Afghanistan after 9/11. The Telegraph reported that "The 36-year-old foreign correspondent is rapidly emerging as one of the BBC's biggest stars." She "held a number of high-profile foreign postings", and won the 2001 news event award from the Royal Television Society, for her coverage of the Belgrade revolution. Broadcaster Sue MacGregor said of her reporting in Afghanistan that "Kate Clark, Jacky Rowland, Susannah Price and Catherine Davis from the BBC World Service all distinguished themselves with daily accounts of the battle, and their names became almost as familiar as John Simpson's" and Geoffrey Goodman commented in the British Journalism Review that "it is on television more than in newspapers that we have seen the emergence of half a dozen new stars of women war reporters – Jacky Rowland, already seasoned in North Africa and Kosovo, now Jerusalem; Susannah Price, Kate Clark both in Pakistan and Afghanistan; as well as the well established, accomplished brilliance of Janine di Giovanni", but Kate Adie complained that she had "a cute face, cute bottom and nothing else in between". Her reporting from a Serb prison in Kosovo after it was bombed by NATO "made her name". In 2002, she was the first journalist to testify at the trial of Slobodan Milosevic, to state that not all the bodies in the prison had been killed by the bombing, a decision which drew mixed responses from other journalists. She said that would not return to Yugoslavia for her safety and that her decision to testify had been a "test case".

=== Al Jazeera English ===
Rowland is an Al Jazeera English correspondent in Europe. Previously, she was based in Jerusalem, recruited from the BBC at the same time as ITN's David Chater "to fill key positions". Reporting in the West Bank in 2009, she came under tear gas fire from the IDF, and she reported under "highly dangerous conditions" from Cairo during the Egyptian Revolution in 2011. She contributed to the 2011 book "How to Avoid Being Killed in a War Zone", giving the advice "Always carry a photograph of you with your children." Rowland has also hosted studio-based interview-programmes.

She won Outstanding Contribution to Broadcasting at the 2011 International Media Awards.

== Education ==
Rowland graduated in Modern Languages from St Anne's College, Oxford in 1986.
