= Naked Jungle =

2000 British television game show

- Genre: Game show
- Based on: Jungle Run
- Directed by: Patrick Titley
- Presented by: Keith Chegwin
- Country of origin: United Kingdom
- Original language: English
- No. of episodes: 1

Production
- Producer: Caroline Gosling
- Running time: 60 minutes
- Production company: Granada Television

Original release
- Network: Channel 5
- Release: 6 June 2000

Naked Jungle is a one-off television game show produced for the United Kingdom terrestrial TV station Channel 5 by Granada Television, airing on 6 June 2000. A gameshow with an assault course format, based on and using the same set as the children's show Jungle Run, it was controversial because its contestants were nudists. The programme's presenter, Keith Chegwin, was also naked, except for a hat. It was part of a special season of programmes on the channel to mark the 50th anniversary of British naturism.

== Format ==
The programme was made by the same producers as CITV's children's gameshow Jungle Run, and used the same set as well as following the same format, apart from having individual winners instead of a winning team. The ten competitors were five naturist couples, who were separated into men and women with a single winner from each sex. The winner of the men and of the women then competed in a final inside the "Temple of the Body" to win a potential prize of £5,000. The winners shared a prize of £3,000. While in Jungle Run the competitors collected bananas (later monkey statues), in Naked Jungle the objective was to obtain fig leaves, a Biblical cover for genitalia.

== Reception ==
Naked Jungle attracted two million viewers, then a record for the channel, and 20% of the audience share in its time slot. Since its debut in 1997, Channel 5 had been aiming to attract 5% of the total audience.

Channel 5 stated that it had received 50 phonecalls relating to the programme, "evenly split" between appreciation and criticism, including a woman who held the programme responsible for curing her post-natal depression. The Independent Television Commission (ITC) declared that it had only received one complaint about the show. This was from a viewer complaining that he could "do without Keith Chegwin prancing around". An ITC spokesman said that there was no guideline against Keith Chegwin being on television, and that "Late-night nudity in a non-sexual context and in a programme that is well signposted may not be in breach of the programme codes."

However, the show's full-frontal nudity and display of genitalia caused a furore in the Daily Mail, which described the show as having "plumbed new depths [of indecency on television]". A column in The Guardian on 11 June was critical of the Mail's approach to the show, wondering how journalist Edward Heathcote Amory had seen the programme, and saying that such gameshows were commonplace in continental Europe. Another column in the same newspaper two days later aimed to explain the difference between nudity and pornography using the show's controversy in the Daily Mail as an example, saying "The naturist gloss assured us (a) that no one will mention blow jobs and (b) that the women will have droopy breasts". Channel 5 controller Dawn Airey also criticised the approach of the Daily Mail, opining that despite their outrage, the Mail would be supportive of "the WI posing naked for a calendar".

Following the special, Culture Secretary Chris Smith made comments implicating concern for the programme and other risqué content of Channel 5 in the House of Commons. He identified that there had been "a very considerable concern about some of the content on television, particularly in relation to Channel 5", stating that the government "cannot and should not, of course, directly intervene, but I believe that the broadcasters have a commercial and moral duty to take account of the views of the public and I urge them to do so."

In August 2006, a Radio Times poll called it the worst British television programme ever. In a 2007 interview with Digital Spy, Chegwin said of Naked Jungle "It's the worst career move I made in my entire life – if I could turn the clock back, I would!" He said that due to the programme's timeslot of 11 pm on a Tuesday, he believed that it would not have gained as much publicity as it did.

== Home video ==
The special was released on VHS by Universal Pictures Video under its "Playback" label on 31 July 2000. The VHS version of the special includes content not seen in the original Channel 5 broadcast.
