= Hacio =

- Hacio logo
- Hacio (Welsh)
- Genre: Current affairs
- Countries of origin: United Kingdom (Wales)
- Original language: Welsh

Production
- Production company: ITV Cymru Wales

Original release
- Network: S4C
- Release: 2000 – 2017

Related
- Ein Byd (Welsh for 'Our World')

Hacio (Welsh for 'Hacking', Welsh pronunciation: [ˈhakjɔ]) is a former Welsh language current affairs television programme for young people. It was produced for S4C by ITV Cymru Wales and broadcast on Thursday nights at 10.00pm. The programme, first broadcast in 2000, aimed to address issues and illustrate stories of interest to young people from all parts of Wales and beyond.

Hacio was produced almost entirely by a young crew of journalists who researched, shot and edited their own material. The material for the programme was often but not always gathered on lightweight DVCAM cameras, typically the Sony DSR-500 or HVR-Z1E, and edited online using desktop editing software called Avid. In 2014 a website for young people was launched in conjunction with the team.

In July 2017, it was reported that the programme had been scrapped as part of a restructuring of S4C's current affairs output. In January 2018, ITV Cymru Wales launched a new current affairs series for the channel, Ein Byd (Welsh for 'Our World').
