= The Unforgettable =

British TV series (2000–2012)

- Narrated by: Daniel Abineri (series 1–3); Martin Glyn Murray (series 4–5)
- Country of origin: United Kingdom
- Original language: English
- No. of series: 5
- No. of episodes: 39

Production
- Producer: John Quinn
- Running time: 30 to 60 minutes
- Production companies: Watchmaker Productions (series 1); North One Television (series 2–5)

Original release
- Network: ITV
- Release: 21 January 2000 – 21 May 2002
- Release: 8 August 2010 – 30 May 2012

The Unforgettable was a British television obituary-based documentary programme which aired on ITV from 21 January 2000 to 30 May 2012. It gave a biographical view into the lives of some of Britain's best-remembered entertainers and actors.

Each episode focused on the parallel private and professional life-stories of each person, which included interviews with friends, family and co-stars. The series also used previously unaired home recordings and personal photographs.

== Series overview ==
=== Regular series ===
Series	Start date	End date	Episodes
1	21 January 2000	7 April 2000	6
2	18 September 2000	31 December 2000	6
3	2 September 2001	21 May 2002	7
4	8 August 2010	23 December 2010	8
5	8 November 2011	30 May 2012	11

=== 2015 special ===
Entitle	Date	Episodes
The Sweeney	4 September 2015	1

== Episodes ==
To date, five series have been produced, the first three from 21 January 2000 to 21 May 2002. Following an eight-year hiatus, the series returned on 8 August 2010.

The first two series were made by Watchmaker Productions. Series 3 was made by Chrysalis Entertainment, whilst series 4 and 5 are made by North One Television, which are all now part of All3Media.

In total, 38 regular episodes were produced.

The last obituary-based documentary in the series was broadcast on 30 May 2012. However, there was an additional one-off edition on 4 September 2015, focusing on The Sweeney, bringing the number of episodes to 39.

=== Series 1 (2000) ===
All 6 episodes are 30 minutes long.

No. overall	No. in series	Episode title	Transmission
1	1	Hattie Jacques	21 January 2000
2	2	Richard Beckinsale	15 March 2000
3	3	Larry Grayson	19 March 2000
4	4	Diana Dors	24 March 2000
5	5	Kenny Everett	31 March 2000
6	6	Pat Phoenix	7 April 2000

=== Series 2 (2000) ===
All 6 episodes are 30 minutes long.

No. overall	No. in series	Episode title	Transmission
7	1	Arthur Lowe	18 September 2000
8	2	Leonard Rossiter	25 September 2000
9	3	Sid James	5 December 2000
10	4	Les Dawson	11 December 2000
11	5	Frankie Howerd	18 December 2000
12	6	Beryl Reid	31 December 2000

=== Series 3 (2001-2002) ===
Editions are 40 minutes long unless stated.

No. overall	No. in series	Episode title	Transmission
13	1	Tommy Cooper	2 September 2001
14	2	John Le Mesurier	9 September 2001
15	3	Kenneth Williams	23 September 2001
16	4	Yootha Joyce	3 October 2001 (30 mins)
17	5	Eric Morecambe	2 November 2001 (1 hour)
18	6	Benny Hill	14 December 2001
19	7	Joan Sims	21 May 2002

=== Series 4 (2010) ===
Episodes 1, 2, 5, 6, 7 and 8 are one hour long unless stated.

No. overall	No. in series	Episode title	Transmission
20	1	Bob Monkhouse	8 August 2010
21	2	Jeremy Beadle	15 August 2010
22	3	Mollie Sugden	8 September 2010 (30 mins)
23	4	Terry Scott	22 September 2010 (30 mins)
24	5	Harry Secombe	20 December 2010
25	6	Danny La Rue	21 December 2010
26	7	Mike Reid	22 December 2010
27	8	Spike Milligan	23 December 2010

=== Series 5 (2011–2012) ===
All editions are 30 minutes long, unless stated.

No. overall	No. in series	Episode title	Transmission
28	1	Norman Wisdom	8 November 2011
29	2	Ernie Wise	26 December 2011 (1 hour)
30	3	John Thaw	1 January 2012 (1 hour)
31	4	Leslie Crowther	11 January 2012
32	5	Rod Hull	1 February 2012
33	6	Russell Harty	21 March 2012
34	7	Dick Emery	11 April 2012
35	8	Hughie Green	2 May 2012
36	9	Noele Gordon	16 May 2012
37	10	Dudley Moore	23 May 2012
38	11	Gordon Jackson	30 May 2012
39	12	The Sweeney	4 September 2015 (1 hour)
