= S Club 7 Go Wild! =

- S Club 7 Go Wild! opening titles
- Starring: S Club 7
- Opening theme: "Never Had a Dream Come True"
- Country of origin: United Kingdom
- No. of seasons: 1
- No. of episodes: 7

Production
- Running time: 30 minutes
- Production companies: At It Productions; 19 Entertainment; Popworld

Original release
- Network: BBC One
- Release: 25 September – 6 November 2000

S Club 7 Go Wild! is a television series starring British pop group S Club 7, who worked with the World Wide Fund for Nature (WWF) to help raise awareness of the threats facing wildlife around the world. Each member adopted an endangered animal and travelled to their respective natural habitat in different locations around the globe. There were seven 30-minute episodes, one for each member of the band, which were aired on BBC One in the UK.

== Episodes ==
=== Episode 1: Paul in Kenya ===
Paul Cattermole travelled to Kenya in search of the endangered black rhino with Rachel Stevens.

Day 1: Paul went in search of the black rhino. He was unsuccessful, but he did see cheetah cubs. Rachel went shopping in the market for presents for the rest of the group.

Day 2: Paul travelled to Masai Mara with Rachel. There he had a game drive, and showed the tribe some dance moves with Rachel.

Day 3: When Paul went to bed, he could hear all the animal noises; he found it very frightening.

Day 4: Paul went hot air ballooning with Rachel. They got to see the wildebeest migration. Later that day, he continued his hunt, and saw a black rhino.

Day 5: Paul and Rachel went on a river cruise and saw hippos and fish eagles. Then they started their return to the United Kingdom.

=== Episode 2: Jo in Thailand ===
Jo O'Meara travelled to Thailand in search of the Asian elephant, accompanied by Jon Lee and Tina Barrett.

Day 1: Jo, Jon, and Tina spent the day shopping for presents and traditional Thai outfits in Chiang Mai.

Day 2: Jo travelled to a WWF project, where she saw some Asian elephants. She trekked into the jungle with an elephant to a Thai hill tribe.

Day 3: Jo spent the day at the Thailand Elephant Conservation Centre. This was their last day in Thailand.

=== Episode 3: Bradley in Brazil ===
Bradley McIntosh travelled to Brazil in search of the rare hyacinth macaw. Hannah Spearritt accompanied him.

Day 1: Bradley took a helicopter ride over Rio de Janeiro. Hannah took the tram up to see the statue of Christ.

Day 2: Bradley flew to São Paulo to see a World Cup qualifying match between Brazil and Argentina.

Day 3: Bradley travelled into the jungle with Hannah.

Day 4: Bradley and Hannah found a nesting pair of hyacinth macaws. That night, they went looking for crocodiles.

Day 5: Bradley and Hannah spent the day feeding the animals at a ranch.

=== Episode 4: Tina in China ===
Tina Barrett travelled to China in search of the giant panda with Jo O'Meara and Jon Lee.

Day 1: Tina went to see the Great Wall of China. As the group walked along the wall, they gave facts about the history of the famous landmark.

Day 2: Tina did karaoke and went ten pin bowling.

Day 3: Tina got to see some of the remaining giant pandas.

Day 4: Tina, Jon, and Jo trekked up Mount Emei to see a panoramic view of China. They stayed there to watch the sunrise. This was their last day in China.

=== Episode 5: Hannah in Turkey ===
Hannah Spearritt travelled to Turkey to find the monk seal with Bradley McIntosh.

Day 1: Hannah went shopping in Istanbul for Bradley's birthday.

Day 2: Hannah went for a camel trek.

Day 3: Hannah and Bradley went fishing with some Turkish fishermen.

Day 4: Hannah went scuba diving with Bradley, but did not see a monk seal.

Day 5: Hannah went jet-skiing, but was disheartened after still not finding a seal.

=== Episode 6: Rachel in Russia ===
Rachel Stevens travelled to Russia searching for the Siberian tiger with Paul Cattermole.

Day 1: Rachel and Paul spent the day travelling across Russia, starting in Moscow.

Day 2: Rachel had a tour of Vladivostok. Rachel made a stop at a museum to learn more about the Siberian tiger.

Day 3: Rachel joined up with some WWF staff. They found a tiger footprint. Rachel learned about poaching. Paul was stuck with finding them suitable accommodations for their stay.

Day 4: Rachel and Paul saw a family of five tigers.

Day 5: Rachel and Paul went to the Vladivostok Beach and began their return to the UK.

=== Episode 7: Jon in Malaysia ===
Jon Lee, Tina Barrett, and Jo O'Meara travelled to Malaysia in search of the orangutan.

Day 1: Jon, Tina, and Jo travelled to Borneo, where they went to a bat cave to get "dinner". They went to the Monsopiad Cultural Village, which was home to the Kadazan Warrior. There they saw 39 human skulls.

Day 2: Jon took a boat trip in the rain, where he saw some orangutans from the river. Jon was able to see a water snake and some elephants. Jo and Tina went to an island to find sea turtles and went snorkeling. Jo and Tina helped day-old sea turtles into the sea.

Day 3: Tina and Jo flew by helicopter to meet Jon. They went to an orangutan center and got to meet the animals face to face.

== Home media ==
Not only was Go Wild! released on VHS, but unlike all the other S Club TV Shows, this one was released on DVD, making Go Wild! the only S Club show to get a DVD release.
