= Hero to Zero =

- Genre: Drama; Soap
- Written by: John Salthouse
- Directed by: Bob Tomson
- Starring: Michael Owen; Huw Proctor
- Country of origin: United Kingdom
- Original language: English
- No. of series: 1
- No. of episodes: 6

Production
- Producer: Cas Lester
- Running time: 30 minutes

Original release
- Network: BBC One
- Release: 23 February 2000

Hero to Zero is a British children's drama television show about a young boy named Charlie Brice who has many adventures while receiving advice from footballer Michael Owen. The six-part series premiered 23 February 2000, on BBC One.

== Cast ==
- Huw Proctor – Charlie Brice
- Michael Owen – Himself
- Ian Burfield – Jimmy Brice
- Angela Simpson – Rachel Brice
- Angela Bruce – Mrs. Vaughn
- Fo Cullen – Teresa
- Alan Ford – Ron Warley
- Elliot Frost – Dean
- Niall Gallagher – Eamon
- Jane Hazlegrove – Miss Horsborough
- Terence Hillyer – Keith
- Johnny Jhooti – Jeetan
- Steven Law – Luca
- Steven Loveridge – Roberto
- Robert Lupton – Barry
- Julie Mccahill – Angela
- Julius Mngadi – Carl
- Ryan Moore – Chris
- Cathy Murphy – Janice
- Cliff Parisi – Vic Morrish
- Sophie Reed – Kelly
- Renay Richardson – Sade
- Joshua Rideout – Jonathan Morrish
- Matthew James Thomas – Ben
- Farist Uter – Rafet
- Scott Walker – Kid that Got Nutmeged
