= Trisha Goddard (TV series) =

British TV series (1998–2010)

- Also known as: Trisha
- Genre: Tabloid talk show
- Presented by: Trisha Goddard
- Country of origin: United Kingdom
- Original language: English

Production
- Running time: 60 minutes (inc. adverts)
- Production companies: Anglia in association with Universal Television (ITV); Town House TV (Channel 5)

Original release
- Network: ITV; ITV2
- Release: 21 September 1998 – 15 April 2005
- Network: Channel 5; Fiver (2006–2010)
- Release: 24 January 2005 – 17 December 2010

Related
- Trisha: Extra (2002–2003); The Trisha Goddard Show

Trisha Goddard, formerly called Trisha, is a British tabloid talk show hosted by Trisha Goddard. It initially aired on ITV in a mid-morning slot from 1998 to 2004 before moving to Channel 5 in January 2005, where it was broadcast until December 2010. It was also shown on ITV's digital channel ITV2 with a spin-off show called Trisha: Extra and a double bill of the main Trisha show every afternoon.

In February 1999, the show was caught up in a fake guests controversy after it emerged that the agent who supplied guests to its BBC rival The Vanessa Show did the same for Trisha, but the show's editor Sally-Ann Howard, denies any of her team were aware that the guests were fakes.

== Format ==
The show started and ended taking over from Vanessa Feltz and the Vanessa show, after Feltz defected to the BBC to host a similar show. Initially, Trisha Goddard continued her predecessor's tradition of light-hearted debate, on subjects such as men who wore women's clothes. Goddard would also interview ordinary people in the news.

However, from around 2001 the show began modelling itself on The Jerry Springer Show, which at the time had a following in the UK. More and more, Trisha began to focus on working-class or underclass guests and their numerous problems. These were usually to do with infidelity and/or paternity issues, but other subjects covered included troublesome teenagers or surprise family reunions.

Goddard hosts the programme, which is well known for the conducting of lie detector tests and DNA tests, the results of which are then revealed on air. Robert Phipps, a body language expert, frequently guests on the show.

Trisha has frequently been accused of exploiting its subjects plus copying American formats such as The Maury Povich Show. Verbal abuse and physical fights between guests sometimes break out on the show, the latter are never shown. Instead the camera cuts to the audience or Trisha herself until her security team restores order.

Trisha took some of her "experts" with her to Channel 5, including counsellor advisor on Aftercare for show and Psychological factors Ricky Maczka, Robert Phipps and head security guard Pete. Others, such as counsellor Claire Evans and polygraph expert Bruce Burgess, stayed with ITV to work on its successor show, The Jeremy Kyle Show.

The show production base was moved from the ITV Anglia studios in Norwich to The Maidstone Studios in Kent.

== Dispute and move to Five ==
Trisha ceased production in 2004, when ITV refused to allow Trisha's own TV production company, Town House TV, to make future episodes of the show. She decided not to renew her contract and moved to rival broadcaster Channel 5 to present a similar series. The new programme, Trisha Goddard, was made by Town House TV. ITV mounted a successful spoiler campaign against Trisha's new series; they stockpiled their remaining episodes of Trisha until the launch date of Trisha Goddard.

Trisha Goddard launched on Channel 5 on Monday 24 January 2005, but it was shown in the afternoons and not directly opposite ITV's series. ITV did, however, schedule a double bill of Trisha on ITV2 to clash with the series on Channel 5. The first Trisha Goddard gained 500,000 viewers on Channel 5, significantly fewer than the 1.3 million viewers who watched ITV's show. Repeats of the ITV version carried on until 15 April 2005. When ITV finally ran out of Trisha episodes, it was initially replaced by The Springer Show which began in June 2005; at the same time, Channel 5 began running Trisha Goddard in its usual morning slot. From 16 October 2006, it was aired on both Channel 5 and then in a double-bill on its new female-oriented digital channel Fiver (formerly Five Life).

On 9 January 2009, Channel 5 announced that Trisha Goddard had been cancelled. The channel blamed the "current economic climate" for the "difficult decision".

== Trisha: Extra ==
Trisha: Extra was a spin-off show broadcast on ITV's digital sibling channel ITV2, with the first edition broadcast on 4 November 2002, as part of an extended morning lineup on the channel.

== American version ==
In July 2011, it was announced that NBCUniversal Television Distribution will bring Goddard to the United States to launch an American version of her program, which would follow the same concept as her British version. The American version was picked up by NBC O&O's and other stations owned by Sinclair Broadcasting Group and launched in September 2012. The show ran for two seasons before being cancelled.
