= The Des O'Connor Show =

- Presented by: Des O'Connor
- Country of origin: United Kingdom
- No. of series: 8 (ITV)
- No. of episodes: 67

Production
- Running time: 30 minutes (Series 1–6); 60 minutes (Series 7–8)
- Production company: ATV

Original release
- Network: ITV/NBC
- Release: 29 May 1963 – 28 December 1973

Related
- Des O'Connor Tonight

The Des O'Connor Show is a British variety and chat show hosted by Des O'Connor which was broadcast on ITV from 1963 until 1973.

== History ==
Associated Television produced the programme, which was recorded in black-and-white for the first six series.

When the seventh series of the show aired in colour in 1970, ITV licensed the programme to the National Broadcasting Company in the United States, where it aired during prime time, and continued for one more series. Some entertainment celebrities of the time, such as Patrick Newell and Dom DeLuise, made multiple guest appearances on the show.

In the United States, NBC retitled the programme to Kraft Music Hall Presents the Des O'Connor Show, after their own variety show Kraft Music Hall, which also ended in 1971.

== ITV transmissions ==
=== Series ===
Series	Start date	End date	Episodes
1	29 May 1963	9 July 1963	6
2	23 June 1965	4 August 1965	6
3	30 March 1966	18 May 1966	8
4	October 1966	November 1966	8
5	1967	13 October 1967	?
6	20 April 1968	15 June 1968	9
7	9 May 1970	8 August 1970	14
8	26 June 1971	25 September 1971	14

=== Specials ===
Date	Entitle
2 November 1968	
28 December 1973	

== DVD ==
A DVD release Des O'Connor Volume 1 (22 June 2009) collects various highlights from Kraft Music Hall Presents the Des O'Connor Show.

== See also ==
- Des O'Connor Tonight (1977–2002)
