= 2000 in the United Kingdom =

Events from the year 2000 in the United Kingdom.

== Incumbents ==
- Monarch – Elizabeth II
- Prime Minister – Tony Blair (Labour)

== Events ==
=== January ===
- Japanese carmaker Nissan adds a third model to its factory near Sunderland: the new generation of the Almera hatchback and saloon which goes on sale in March.
- 1 January – Millennium celebrations take place throughout the UK. The Millennium Dome in London is officially opened by HM The Queen.
- 4 January – Catherine Hartley and Fiona Thornewill become the first British women to reach the South Pole.
- 10 January – Tony Blair's wife, Cherie, is fined for not having a valid train ticket with her on a journey from Blackfriars to Luton. She claims to have had only Portuguese currency with her at the time and to have been unable to find a machine where she could use her credit card.
- 11 January – A Scottish trawler, the Solway Harvester, sinks in the Irish Sea, killing seven sailors.
- 12 January – Indictment and arrest of Augusto Pinochet: It is announced that former Chilean dictator, Augusto Pinochet, is to be deported after the home secretary, Jack Straw, accepts "unequivocal and unanimous" medical evidence that Pinochet is unfit to stand trial in Spain on charges of torture.
- 22 January – The Rugby league 2000 World Club Challenge is won by Melbourne Storm who defeat St. Helens 44 – 6 at the JJB Stadium in Wigan.
- 28 January – The Liberal Democrat MP for Cheltenham, Nigel Jones, is attacked at his constituency surgery by a mentally disturbed man with a samurai sword. Andrew Pennington, a councillor, comes to Jones's defence but is stabbed nine times and dies later aged 39.
- 31 January – Dr. Harold Shipman is sentenced to life imprisonment after being found guilty of murdering fifteen elderly women patients in Greater Manchester between 1995 and 1998. He is also sentenced to four years in prison, to run concurrently, for forging the will of one of his victims. The subsequent enquiry considers him to have killed at least 215.

=== February ===
- 3 February – At the Ceredigion by-election, Simon Thomas holds the seat for Plaid Cymru.
- 10 February – A group of hijackers hijack an Ariana Afghan Airways plane and force it to fly to the United Kingdom. The plane lands at London Stansted airport and the hijackers surrender to authorities there.
- 11 February
  - The Royal Bank of Scotland succeeds in the hostile takeover battle for its larger English rival, NatWest Bank, successfully defeating a rival offer made by the Bank of Scotland.
  - Northern Ireland Assembly is suspended
- 15 February – Waterhouse report into the North Wales child abuse scandal published.
- 25 February – Murder of Victoria Climbié (aged 8) in London after torture and neglect by her guardians, her aunt Marie Therese Kouao and Kouao's partner Carl Manning; local authority social services departments will be severely criticised for their shortcomings in the case.
- 28 February – The chief of British Nuclear Fuels resigns over a safety scandal at Sellafield.

=== March ===
- 2 March – Indictment and arrest of Augusto Pinochet: The UK deports Augusto Pinochet to his native Chile where he will face trial for human rights violations.
- 14 March – All stores of furniture retailer World of Leather and its parent Uno plc close.
- 15 March – BMW announces plans to sell the Rover Group, with London-based Alchemy consortium emerging as favourites for a takeover.
- 25 March – David Trimble wins the leadership election of the Ulster Unionist Party.
- 31 March – Myra Hindley, who has spent 34 years in prison for her role in the Moors murders, loses a third High Court appeal against a Home Office ruling that her life sentence should mean life.

=== April ===
- April – The Ministry of Defence publishes a booklet Soldiering – The Military Covenant which introduces the term into public discourse referring to the mutual obligations between the nation and its armed forces.
- 1 April
  - An Enigma machine is stolen from Bletchley Park Museum.
  - Section 27 of the Access to Justice Act 1999 comes into force allowing recovery of fees from the losing party in civil actions, extending the availability of conditional fee arrangements.
- 3 April – The Immigration and Asylum Act means that all asylum seekers in England and Wales will now receive vouchers to cover the cost of food and clothing.
- 4 April – Charlie Kray, one of the infamous Kray brothers, dies in a hospital on the Isle of Wight after suffering a heart attack in Parkhurst Prison at age 73.
- 12 April – The Royal Ulster Constabulary is presented with the George Cross by The Queen.
- 14 April
  - Kenneth Noye, the so-called "M25 killer", is sentenced to life imprisonment.
  - Clark v University of Lincolnshire and Humberside decided in the Supreme Court determining that actions by universities established by statute are subject to judicial review, though the courts will not adjudicate on questions of academic judgment.
- 19 April – Tony Martin is sentenced to life imprisonment for the murder of a sixteen-year-old burglar, Fred Barras, he shot dead at his Norfolk farmhouse eight months ago; he is also convicted of the attempted murder of Brendon Fearon, the burglar wounded when Martin opened fire.
- 29 April – At Murrayfield Stadium, the 2000 Challenge Cup rugby league tournament culminates in the Bradford Bulls' 24 – 18 win in the final against the Leeds Rhinos.

=== May ===
- 1 May – May Day riot in Central London by anti-capitalist protestors. The statue of Winston Churchill in Parliament Square and the Cenotaph in Whitehall are daubed with graffiti.
- 3 May – The London Stock Exchange and Germany's Deutsche Börse announce plans to amalgamate; this never happens.
- 4 May
  - London mayoral election: Ken Livingstone, standing as an independent, becomes the first directly elected Mayor of London defeating Steve Norris, the Conservative Party candidate in second place; and Frank Dobson, the Labour Party candidate in third place.
  - At the Romsey by-election following the death of Conservative MP Michael Colvin, the Liberal Democrat candidate Sandra Gidley wins the seat.
- 9 May
  - BMW sells the bulk of the Rover Group (the Rover and MG marques) to the Phoenix Consortium, while it retains the rights to the Mini marque and sells Land Rover to Ford.
  - Convicted child murderer and paedophile Ronald Jebson is further convicted at the Old Bailey of killing Susan Blatchford, 11, and Gary Hanlon, 12. Both disappeared in 1970 after leaving Gary's home in Enfield to go for a walk together. Their bodies were found 11 weeks after their disappearance on Lippitts Hill, Epping Forest.
- 11 May – Introduction of services on Croydon Tramlink, the first trams in London since 1952.
- 12 May
  - The Tate Modern art museum is opened to the public in London.
  - Ford announces that production of cars at the Dagenham plant will end when the Fiesta launches a new generation in 2002.
- 17 May – Royal Marines Alan Chambers and Charlie Paton become the first British people to reach the Geographic North Pole unaided.
- 20 May – Chelsea beat Aston Villa 1–0 to win the last FA Cup final at Wembley Stadium before the old stadium (which is due to close in October) is rebuilt.
- 21 May
  - Best-selling author Dame Barbara Cartland dies aged 98 at her home near Hatfield, Hertfordshire.
  - Long-serving actor Sir John Gielgud dies aged 94 at his home at Wooton Underwood, Buckinghamshire.
- 24 May – National Botanic Garden of Wales opens to the public in Carmarthenshire.
- 25 May – National Waste Strategy, covering England and Wales, first published.

=== June ===
- June – Celtic Manor Wales Open European Tour golf tournament first played.
- 7 June – Tony Blair receives a hostile reception during a speech at the Women's Institute, where he is heckled and slow hand-clapped by furious members.
- 8 June – The British military attaché to Greece, Brigadier Stephen Saunders, aged 52, is shot dead while driving in Athens; the Greek terrorist group 17 November later claims responsibility.
- 10 June – The much-anticipated Millennium Bridge across the Thames in London opens to the public, but has to close after it starts swaying.
- 12 June–20 June – The England national football team participates at Euro 2000, jointly hosted by the Netherlands and Belgium. Despite beating Germany, England are eliminated in the group stage after two defeats.
- 21 June – Repeal in Scotland of controversial Section 28 of the Local Government Act 1988 which prevented local authorities from "promoting homosexuality". Section 28 is not repealed in the rest of the UK until 2003.
- 22 June – At the Tottenham by-election following the death of Labour MP Bernie Grant, the Labour candidate David Lammy holds the seat.
- 30 June – David Copeland is found guilty of causing the three 1999 London nail bombings with three deaths. He is sentenced to life imprisonment and the trial judge recommends that he should serve at least thirty years before being considered for parole, meaning that he is likely to remain in prison until at least 2029 and the age of 54.

=== July ===
- July – Vauxhall launches the all-new Agila city car.
- 5 July – Colin Fallows, driving the Vampire turbojet-propelled dragster, sets a British land speed record, a mean 300.3 mph (483.3 km/h), at Elvington, Yorkshire.
- 17 July – Murder of Sarah Payne: an 8-year-old Surrey girl is found dead in West Sussex, having gone missing sixteen days earlier. On 23 July, the News of the World starts a campaign for Sarah's Law, a child sex offender disclosure scheme.
- 18 July – Alex Salmond resigns as leader of the Scottish National Party.– Reality television game show Big Brother first airs in the UK.
- 20 July
  - Production of the Ford Escort, one of Britain's most successful and iconic motoring nameplates, finishes after 32 years, although remaining stocks of the model would continue to be sold until early 2001 while the van model would continue to be produced until 2002.
  - Rioting breaks out in Brixton (south London) following the fatal shooting of Derek Bennett, a 29-year-old black man, by armed police in the area. 27 people are arrested and three police officers are injured.
- 28 July – The final eighty prisoners leave Maze Prison in Northern Ireland as part of the Northern Ireland peace process.

=== August ===
- 3 August – Rioting erupts on the Paulsgrove estate in Portsmouth after more than 100 people besiege a block of flats allegedly housing a convicted child sex offender, the latest vigilante violence against suspected sex offenders since the beginning of the "naming and shaming" campaign by the News of the World.
- 4 August – Queen Elizabeth The Queen Mother celebrates her hundredth birthday.
- 26 August – Gangster and murderer Reggie Kray, in the thirty-second year of his life sentence at Broadmoor Hospital, is released from prison on compassionate grounds by Home Secretary Jack Straw due to bladder cancer from which he is expected to die within weeks.

=== September ===
- September
  - Curriculum 2000 reform of GCE Advanced Level examinations introduced.
  - Ford unveils its all-new second generation Mondeo large family car, which is due for sale towards the end of this year.
- 8 September – UK fuel protests: Protesters block the entrances to oil refineries in protest against high fuel prices. Panic buying by motorists, leads to nationwide petrol shortages, with between 75 and 90% of all UK petrol stations closing due to low supplies in the following week.
- 10 September – Operation Barras, a British military operation to free five soldiers from the Royal Irish Regiment who have been held captive for over two weeks during the Sierra Leone Civil War, rescues all of them.
- 14 September – After beginning the year 20 points behind the Labour government in the opinion polls, the Conservative opposition's hopes of winning the next election (due to be held within eighteen months) are boosted when they come two points ahead of Labour on 38% in a MORI opinion poll. This marks the first time the Conservatives have led the Labour Party in national opinion polling since January 1993.
- 15 September–1 October – Great Britain competes at the Olympics in Sydney and wins 11 Gold, 10 Silver and 7 Bronze medals.
- 18 September – Survivors of the Southall and Ladbroke Grove rail disasters criticise Railtrack for putting costs ahead of safety and causing a series of blunders which led to the tragedies.
- 20 September – A missile is fired from a rocket launcher at the MI6 headquarters building in central London, striking the eighth floor. It is the first time this type of weapon has been used on the mainland, with the Real IRA suspected of being behind the attack.
- 21 September – William McCrea of the Democratic Unionist Party wins the South Antrim by-election from the Ulster Unionist Party.
- 23 September
  - Earthquake in Warwickshire.
  - Rower Steve Redgrave wins his fifth consecutive gold medal at the Olympics.
- 29 September – HM Prison Maze, a prison used to incarcerate members of illegal paramilitaries during the Troubles in Northern Ireland, closes as a result of the Good Friday Agreement.

=== October ===
- October – Ford launches the all-new Mondeo with a range of hatchbacks, saloons and estates.
- 1 October – Reggie Kray dies from cancer at a hotel in Norwich aged 66.
- 3 October – Approximate start of Autumn 2000 Western Europe floods, particularly affecting England, the worst nationally since the winter of 1946–47 in the United Kingdom, precipitated by the most rainfall since 1766.
- 4 October – After 41 years, production of the Mini ends at the Longbridge plant owned by MG Rover in Birmingham. The new model will go into production next Spring at the Cowley plant in Oxford that is owned by German carmaker BMW.
- 7 October – Wembley Stadium closes after seventy-seven years. It is set to reopen in 2003, following a complete reconstruction that will see its seating capacity raised to 90,000 all-seated. In the final game at the old stadium, the England football team loses 1–0 to Germany in their opening qualifying game for the 2002 World Cup and manager Kevin Keegan resigns after eighteen months in charge.
- 10 October – Donald Dewar, the first First Minister of Scotland, is taken to hospital following a fall outside Bute House, his official Edinburgh residence; his health rapidly deteriorates and he dies in office the following day, aged 63.
- 16 October – The BBC's main evening news programme moves to 10pm; early the following year, ITV will move its news programme back to the same time slot and broadcast in direct competition.
- 17 October – Hatfield rail crash: A Great North Eastern Railway InterCity 225 train derails south of Hatfield station, killing four people.
- 23 October
  - After the fuel protests has been resolved, support for the Labour Party has been restored, according to the latest MORI opinion poll which shows them 13 points ahead of the Conservatives with an approval rating of 45%.
  - Michael Martin is elected as the Speaker of the House of Commons following the retirement of Betty Boothroyd.
- 26–27 October – Following the death of Donald Dewar, Henry McLeish is selected to be First Minister of Scotland by the Scottish Parliament, and is officially appointed by The Queen.
- 26 October – House of Lords delivers judgement in White v White, a landmark case in redistribution of finances and property on divorce.
- 30 October – Sven-Göran Eriksson, the 52-year-old Swedish coach of Italian side Lazio, accepts an offer from the Football Association to take charge of the England football team for five years commencing next July. Eriksson will be the first foreign manager to take charge of the England national team, but until his arrival, the England team will be jointly managed by interim coaches Peter Taylor and Howard Wilkinson.

=== November ===
- 7 November – The attempted theft of £350,000,000 worth of diamonds from the Millennium Dome is foiled by police.
- 16 November – Actor Michael Caine receives a knighthood from the Queen.
- 18 November – Marriage of American actor Michael Douglas and Welsh actress Catherine Zeta-Jones, exactly 25 years his junior, in New York City.
- 20 November – Judith Keppel becomes the first person to win £1,000,000 on the ITV game show Who Wants to Be a Millionaire?
- 21 November – Dennis Canavan MSP for Falkirk West, resigns as the Member of Parliament for Falkirk West, triggering a by-election.
- 23 November
  - Double by-election held in Glasgow Anniesland to elect successors to Donald Dewar's seats in both the UK Parliament and the Scottish Parliament. Labour holds both seats with swings to the SNP of 6% and 7%.
  - The Preston by-election is won by the Labour Party candidate Mark Hendrick.
  - The West Bromwich West by-election is won by the Labour Party candidate Adrian Bailey.
- 26 November – Rio Ferdinand, the 22-year-old England national football team defender, becomes the nation's most expensive player in an £18,000,000 transfer from West Ham United to Leeds United.
- 27 November – Damilola Taylor, a 10-year-old boy originally from Nigeria, is stabbed to death on his way home from school in Peckham, London. At a third trial, held in 2006, two teenagers are convicted of his manslaughter.
- 30 November – Political Parties, Elections and Referendums Act 2000 provides for regulation of political parties, elections and referendums, including limits on national expenditure by parties in elections.

=== December ===
- 3 December – The Church of England introduces the Common Worship series of service books.
- 8 December – The Equitable Life Assurance Society closes to new business in the aftermath of the legal case Equitable Life Assurance Society v Hyman.
- 18 December – British pop star Kirsty MacColl, 41, is accidentally killed while diving in Mexico, when a power boat enters a restricted area and collides with her.
- 21 December – Falkirk West by-election results in Eric Joyce retaining the seat for Labour, though with a majority reduced to just 705 votes in the face of a swing of 16.2% to the SNP.
- 22 December – American pop star Madonna, 42, marries 32-year-old British film producer Guy Ritchie at Skibo Castle in the Scottish Highlands.
- 29 December – Arctic weather conditions blight Britain, with heavy snow and temperatures as low as −13 °C plaguing the country, causing extensive gridlocking on roads and railways.
- 31 December – The Millennium Dome closes as planned after one year. It will be repurposed in 2007 when it becomes The O2 and the O2 Arena.

=== Undated ===
- 2000 is the wettest year on record in the UK.
- Sales of the DVD format, first launched in the UK in June 1998, pass the 1 million mark, although the VHS format remains by far the most popular format of home video.

== Publications ==
- Iain M. Banks' novel Look to Windward.
- Lauren Child's children's book I Will Not Ever Never Eat a Tomato, first in the Charlie and Lola series.
- Matthew Kneale's novel English Passengers.
- Nigella Lawson's guide How to be a domestic goddess: baking and the art of comfort cooking.
- Terry Pratchett's Discworld novel The Truth.
- Philip Pullman's novel The Amber Spyglass, third and final book in the His Dark Materials series.
- J. K. Rowling's novel Harry Potter and the Goblet of Fire, fourth in the Harry Potter series.
- Zadie Smith's novel White Teeth.

== Births ==
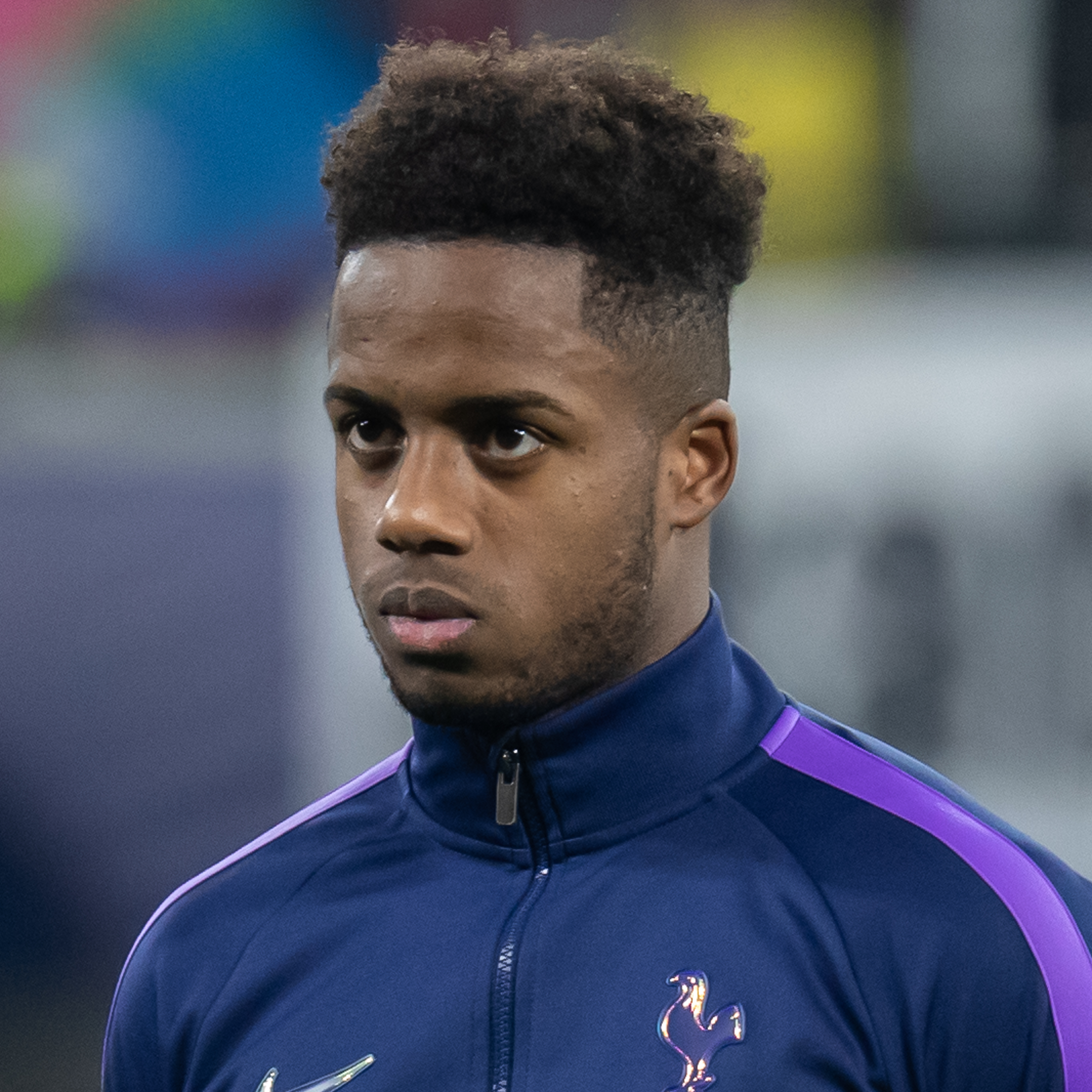
Ryan Sessegnon

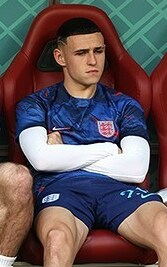
Phil Foden

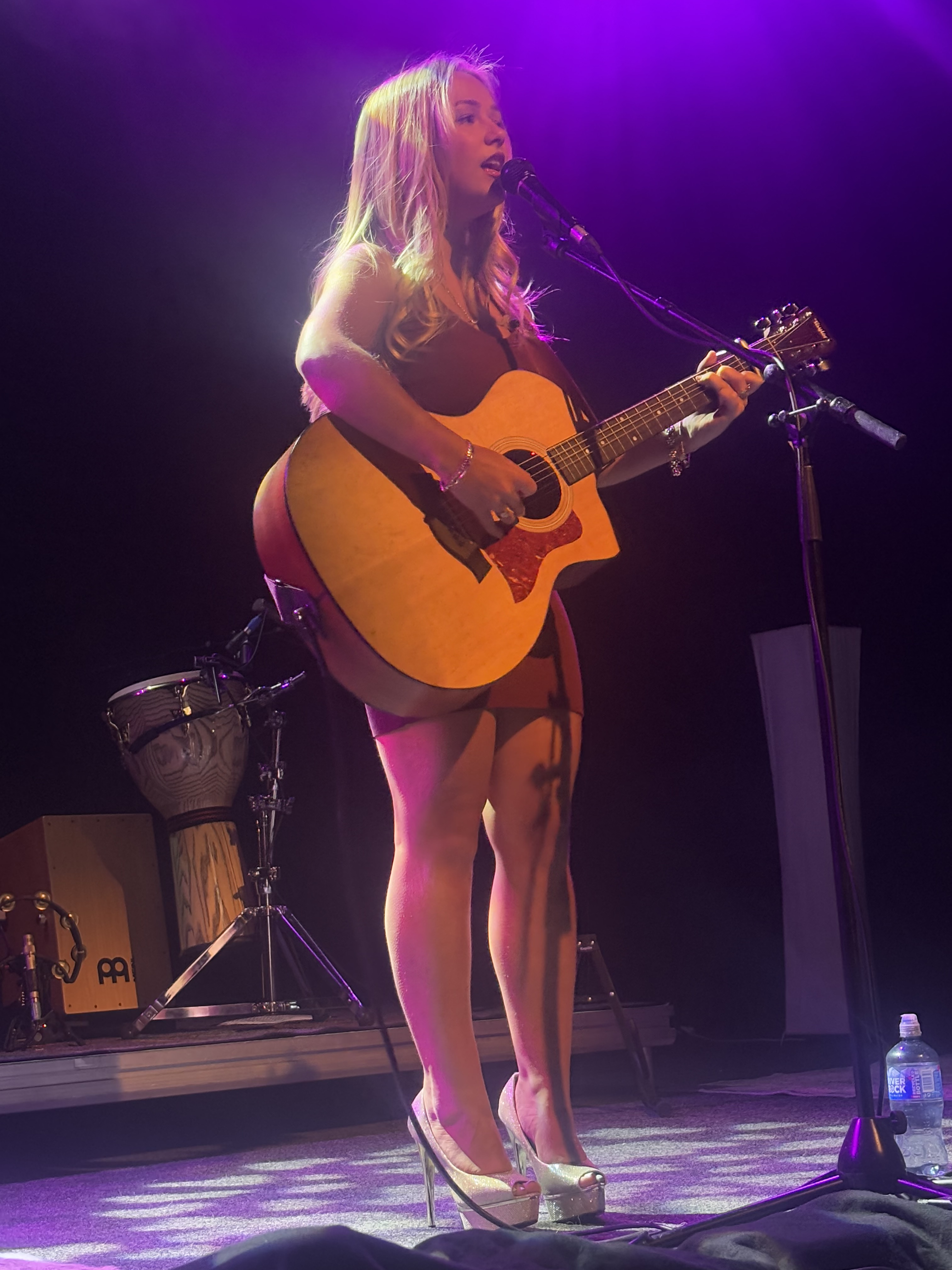
Connie Talbot

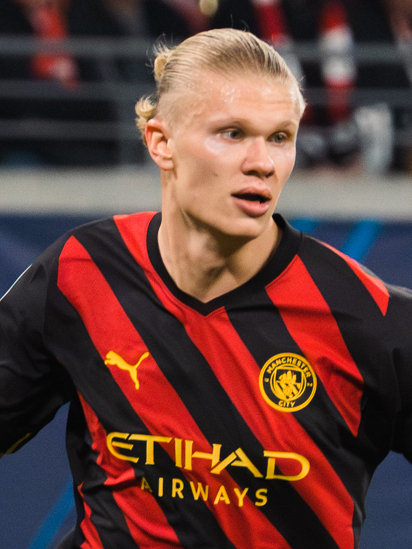
Erling Haaland

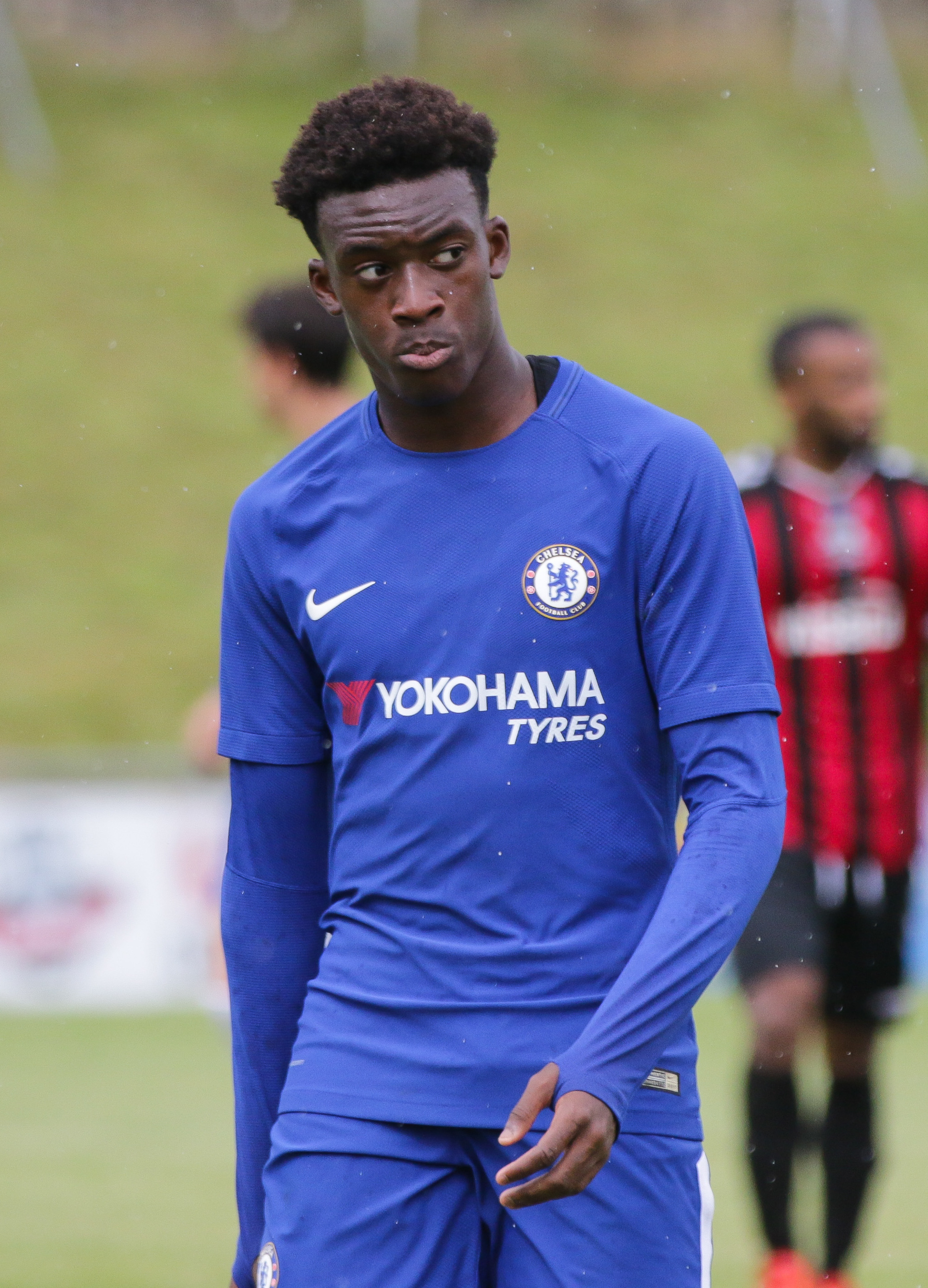
Callum Hudson-Odoi

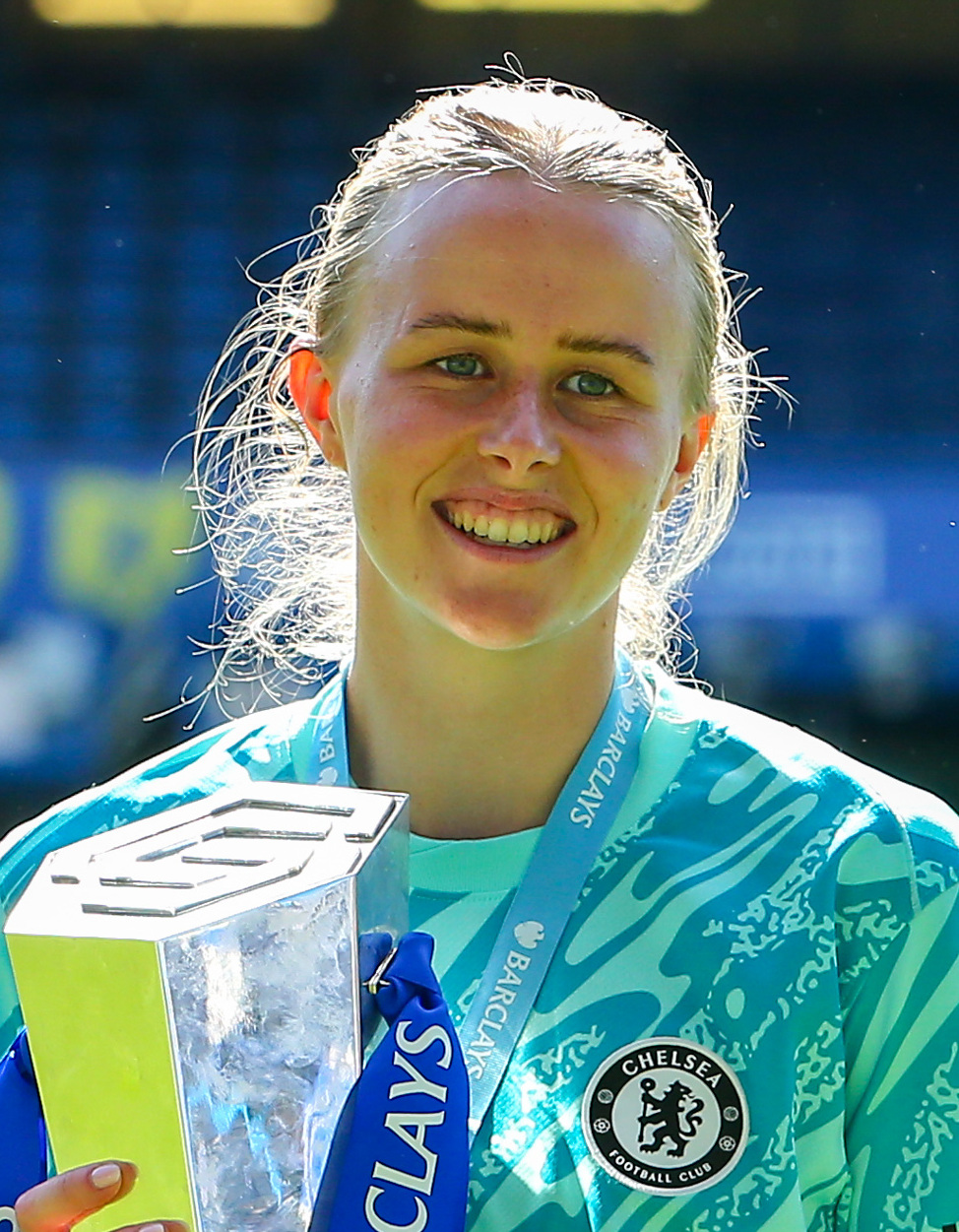
Hannah Hampton

- 4 January – Max Aarons, footballer
- 21 January – Jac Morgan, rugby union player
- 26 January – Ryan Giles, footballer
- 27 January – Morgan Gibbs-White, footballer
- 2 February – Shannon Cooke, footballer
- 6 February – Conor Gallagher, footballer
- 8 February – Cieran Dunne, footballer
- 17 February – Billy Sass-Davies, footballer
- 26 February – Ryan Cooney, footballer
- 14 February – Tashan Oakley-Boothe, footballer
- 5 March – Jack Aitchison, footballer
- 11 March – Kane Wilson, footballer
- 17 March – Molly Caudery, pole vaulter
- 25 March – Jadon Sancho, footballer
- 1 April – Rhian Brewster, footballer
- 8 April – Brenock O'Connor, English actor (Game of Thrones).
- 12 April – Alex Denny, footballer
- 2 May – Tom Dean, freestyle swimmer
- 16 May – Jacob Fletcher, footballer
- 18 May
  - Ryan Sessegnon, footballer
  - Steven Sessegnon, footballer
- 20 May – Leo Blair, son of Prime Minister Tony Blair and his wife, Cherie, the first legitimate child born to a serving prime minister since 1849
- 28 May
  - Phil Foden, footballer
  - Alfie Gleadall, cricketer
- 23 June – Caitlin Blackwood, actress
- 28 June – Ruben Reuter, actor
- 29 June – Kia Pegg, actor
- 21 July – Erling Haaland, footballer
- 25 July – Ellie Soutter, snowboarder (died 2018)
- 28 July – Emile Smith Rowe, footballer
- 9 August
  - Arlo Parks, singer
  - Djed Spence, footballer
- 11 August – James Cartmell, actor
- 28 August – Danny Loader, footballer
- 30 August – Catherine Lyons, artistic gymnast
- 31 August
  - Angel Gomes, footballer
  - Mia Jenkins, actress
- 3 September – Brandon Williams, English footballer
- 14 September – Ethan Ampadu, Welsh footballer
- 16 September – Oliver Skipp, English footballer
- 18 September – Max Bird, footballer
- 6 October – Isobelle Molloy, actress
- 4 October – Archie Lyndhurst, actor (died 2020)
- 5 October – Millie Innes, actress
- 2 November – Georgia-Mae Fenton, artistic gymnast
- 7 November – Callum Hudson-Odoi, footballer
- 8 November – Jasmine Thompson, English singer-songwriter and YouTube celebrity
- 16 November – Hannah Hampton, footballer
- 19 November – Ben Charlesworth, cricketer
- 20 November – Connie Talbot, singer
- 21 November – Matt O'Riley, footballer
- 23 November – Jack Clarke, footballer
- 27 November – Jay Foulston, footballer
- 28 November – Sophia Kiely, actress
- 5 December
  - Hamidullah Qadri, cricketer
  - Freddie Steward, rugby union player
- 28 December – Isobel Steele, actress

== Deaths ==
=== January ===
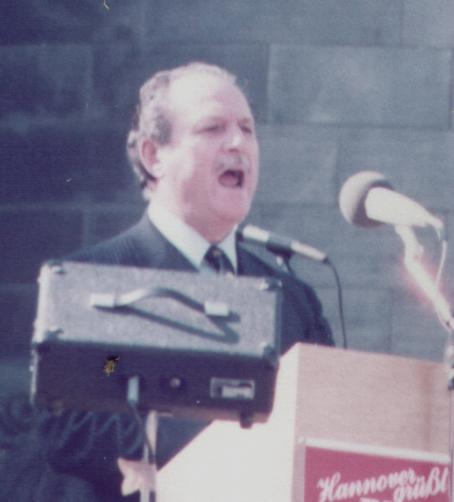
Bernard Braine

- 1 January – Victor Serebriakoff, member of Mensa (born 1912)
- 2 January
  - Patrick O'Brian, novelist (born 1914)
  - Ullin Place, philosopher and psychologist (born 1924)
- 5 January
  - Bernard Braine, Baron Braine of Wheatley, politician (born 1914)
  - Hopper Read, cricketer (born 1910)
- 9 January
  - Arnold Alexander Hall, aeronautical engineer and scientist (born 1915)
  - Nigel Tranter, historian and author (born 1909)
- 13 January – Peter Henderson, Baron Henderson of Brompton, public servant, Clerk of the Parliaments (1974–1983) (born 1922)
- 14 January – Julian Vereker, designer of hi-fi audio equipment (born 1945)
- 17 January
  - Norman Blamey, painter (born 1914)
  - Elisabeth Collins, painter and sculptor (born 1904)
  - Philip Jones, trumpeter (born 1928)
  - Ralph Kekwick, biochemist (born 1908)
- 18 January – Arnold W. G. Kean, civil aviation lawyer (born 1914)
- 22 January – E. W. Swanton, cricket commentator (born 1907)
- 23 January – Willie Hamilton, politician (born 1917)
- 26 January – Kathleen Hale, children's author (born 1898)
- 28 January
  - Sarah Caudwell, barrister and crime fiction writer (born 1939)
  - Andrew Pennington, politician (murdered) (born 1960)
- 30 January – Martin Aldridge, footballer (car accident) (born 1974)

=== February ===
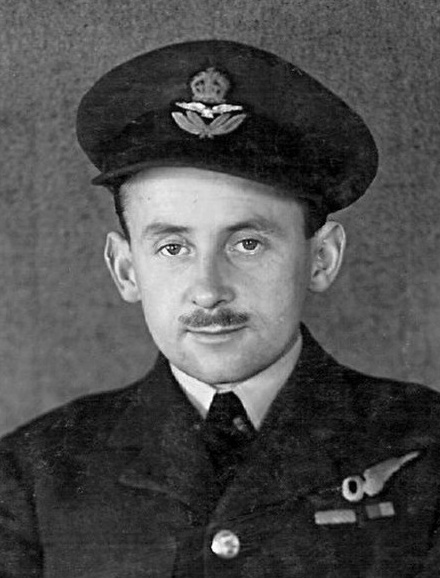
Dominic Bruce

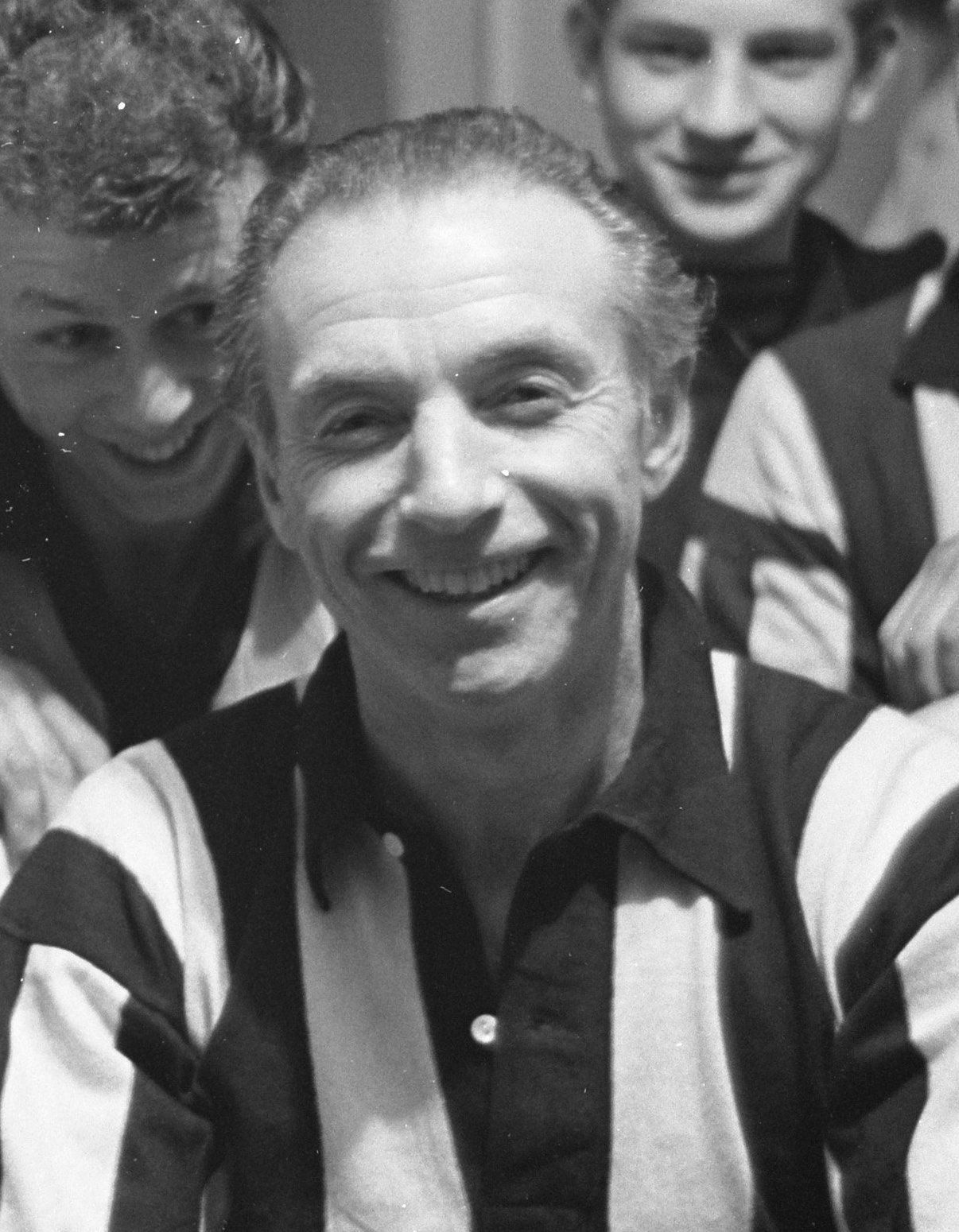
Stanley Matthews

- 1 February – Peter Levi, poet, Jesuit priest and scholar (born 1931)
- 2 February – Mary Docherty, communist activist (born 1908)
- 3 February – Ken Stroud, mathematician (born 1908)
- 5 February – G. E. M. de Ste. Croix, historian (born 1910)
- 7 February
  - Stewart Farrar, screenwriter, novelist and Wiccan priest (born 1916)
  - Dave Peverett, singer and musician (Foghat) (born 1943)
- 12 February – Dominic Bruce, Air Force officer and escapee from Colditz in World War II (born 1915)
- 19 February – Josef Herman, painter (born 1911 in Congress Poland)
- 21 February – Noel Annan, Baron Annan, military intelligence officer, historian and academic (born 1916)
- 22 February
  - Joseph Gold, lawyer (born 1912)
  - Ernest Lough, singer (born 1911)
- 23 February
  - Sir Stanley Matthews, footballer (born 1915)
  - John Nevill, 5th Marquess of Abergavenny, peer (born 1914)
- 24 February – Michael Colvin, politician (born 1932)

=== March ===
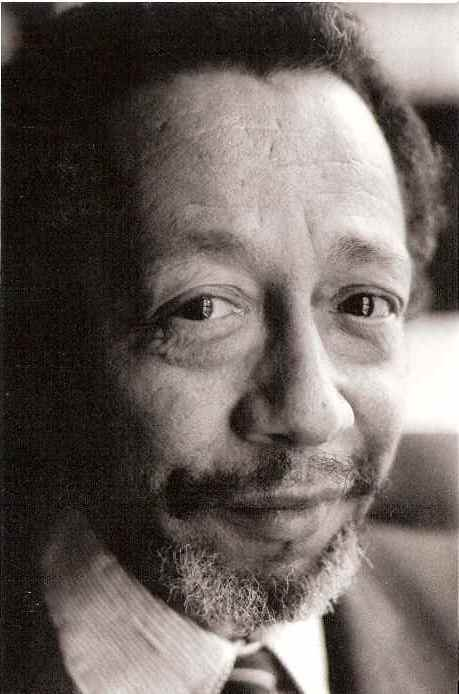
Cab Kaye

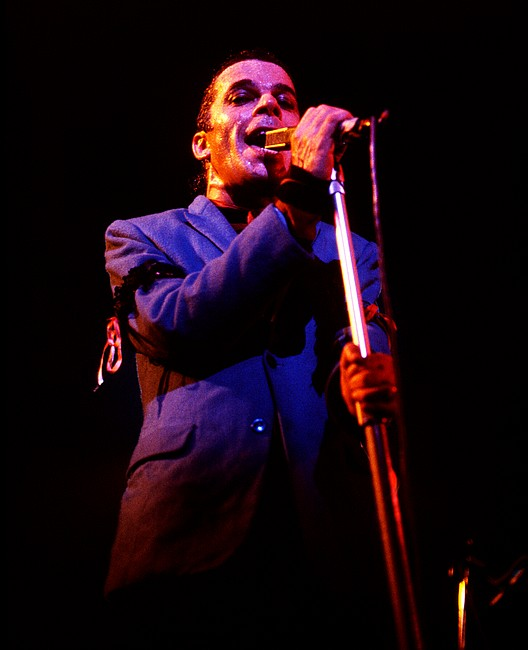
Ian Dury

- 5 March – Alexander Young, operatic tenor (born 1920)
- 6 March – Chris Balderstone, cricketer and footballer (born 1940)
- 7 March
  - Charles Gray, actor (born 1928)
  - W. D. Hamilton, evolutionary biologist (born 1936)
  - Nicolas Walter, anarchist writer (born 1934)
- 10 March – Ivan Hirst, British army officer and engineer, best known for his part in the revival of German carmaker Volkswagen after World War II (born 1914)
- 11 March – Will Roberts, painter (born 1907)
- 13 March – Cab Kaye, jazz singer and pianist (born 1921)
- 15 March – Robert Welch, designer (born 1929)
- 16 March – Roy Henderson, opera singer (born 1899)
- 18 March – Graham Balcombe, cave diver (born 1907)
- 22 March – John Morrison, 2nd Viscount Dunrossil, peer and diplomat (born 1926)
- 26 March – Alex Comfort, scientist and physician (born 1920)
- 27 March – Ian Dury, singer and actor (born 1942)
- 28 March – Anthony Powell, novelist (born 1905)
- 31 March – Adrian Fisher, guitarist (born 1952)

=== April ===
- 1 April – Alexander Mackenzie Stuart, Baron Mackenzie-Stuart, judge (born 1924)
- 2 April – Sir Robert Sainsbury, businessman and art collector (born 1906)
- 3 April – Evelyn Irons, journalist and war correspondent (born 1900)
- 4 April – Bridget Jones, literary academic (born 1935)
- 6 April – William Stobbs, illustrator (born 1914)
- 8 April – Bernie Grant, politician (born 1944 in Guyana)
- 10 April – Peter Jones, actor (born 1920)
- 11 April
  - Diana Darvey, actress (fall) (born 1945)
  - André Deutsch, publisher (born 1917 in Hungary)
- 12 April – Carmen Dillon, film art director and production designer (born 1908)
- 14 April – Wilf Mannion, footballer (born 1918)
- 20 April – Bill Dean, actor (born 1921)
- 24 April
  - Derek Allhusen, equestrian (born 1914)
  - William Moore, actor (born 1916)
- 27 April
  - C. R. Boxer, historian (born 1904)
  - Clifford Forsythe, politician (born 1929)
- 28 April – Penelope Fitzgerald, poet, essayist and biographer (born 1916)

=== May ===
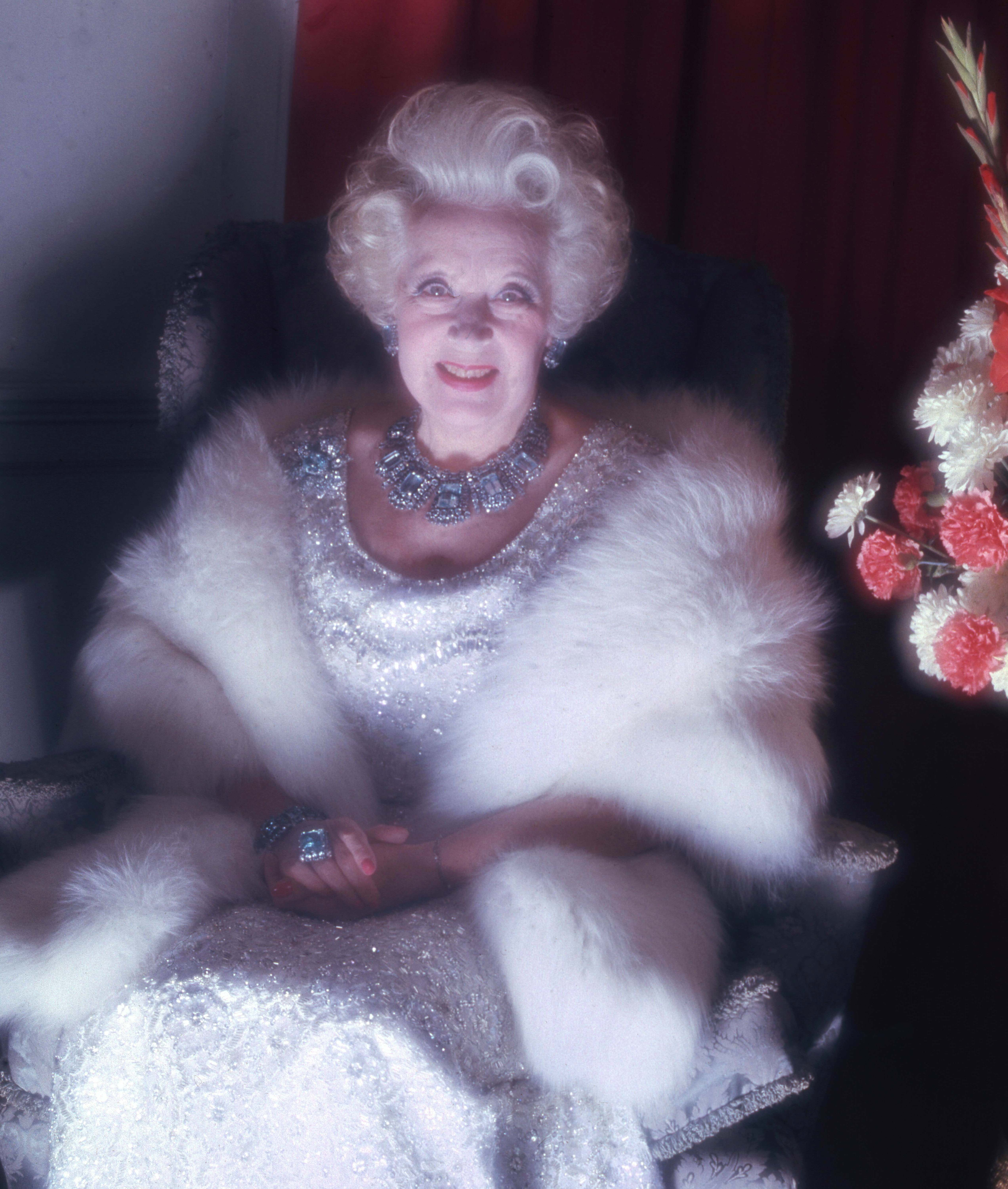
Barbara Cartland

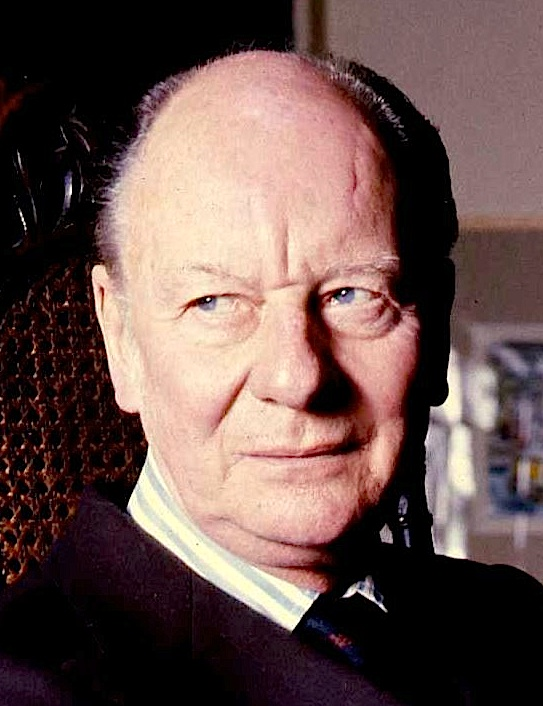
John Gielgud

- 1 May – Nora Swinburne, actress (born 1902)
- 2 May – Billy Munn, jazz pianist (born 1911)
- 3 May – Lewis Allen, film and television director (born 1905)
- 4 May – Derick Ashe, diplomat (born 1919)
- 6 May
  - John Clive Ward, physicist, developer of the Ward–Takahashi identity (born 1924)
  - Peter Youens, diplomat who helped secure the independence of Malawi (born 1916)
- 10 May – Margaret Harris, costume designer (born 1904)
- 14 May – Alex Stuart-Menteth, naval officer in World War II (born 1912)
- 17 May – Donald Coggan, retired Archbishop of York and Canterbury (born 1909)
- 18 May
  - Julie Dawn, singer (born 1919)
  - Denis Gifford, writer, broadcaster and journalist (born 1927)
- 19 May – Larry Lamb, newspaper editor (born 1929)
- 21 May
  - Dame Barbara Cartland, novelist (born 1901)
  - Sir John Gielgud, actor (born 1904)
- 25 May – Nicholas Clay, actor (born 1946)
- 29 May – Aubrey Richards, actor (born 1920)
- 30 May – Doris Hare, actress (born 1905)

=== June ===
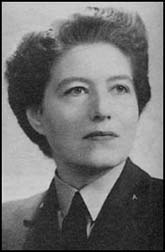
Vera Atkins

- 2 June – Gerald James Whitrow, mathematician and cosmologist (born 1912)
- 8 June – Stephen Saunders, Army brigadier-general (murdered in Greece) (born 1947)
- 12 June
  - Leonard Appelbee, painter and printmaker (born 1914)
  - Sir Roualeyn Cumming-Bruce, barrister and judge (born 1912)
- 14 June – Elsie Widdowson, dietitian and nutritionist (born 1906)
- 15 June – Neville Ford, cricketer (born 1906)
- 17 June – Brian Statham, cricketer (born 1930)
- 19 June – William Papas, cartoonist (born 1927 in South Africa)
- 21 June – Billy Sperrin, footballer (born 1922)
- 24 June
  - Vera Atkins, World War II intelligence officer (born 1908 in Romania)
  - Duncan Kyle, novelist (born 1930)
  - David Tomlinson, actor (born 1917)
- 27 June – David Neal, actor (born 1932)
- 28 June – William Glock, music critic (born 1908)
- 29 June
  - John Abineri, actor (born 1928)
  - John Aspinall, zoo owner (born 1926)
  - Jane Birdwood, Baroness Birdwood, politician (born 1913)
  - Rodney Nuckey, racing driver (born 1929)

=== July ===
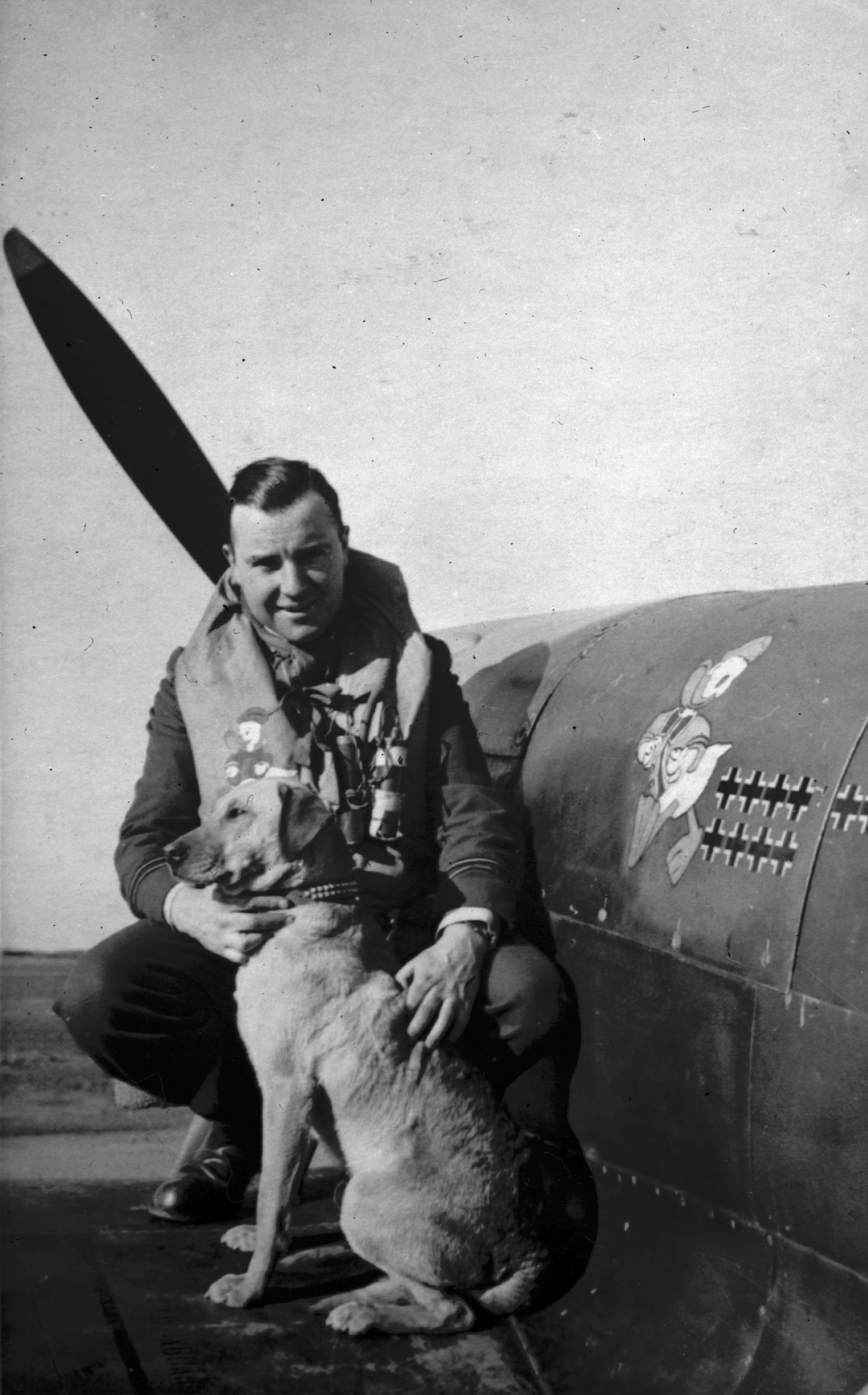
John Albert Axel Gibson

- 1 July – John Albert Axel Gibson, World War II air ace (born 1916)
- 2 July – Joey Dunlop, Northern Irish motorcycle racer (accident while racing) (born 1952)
- 4 July – Philip Lever, 3rd Viscount Leverhulme, peer and racehorse owner (born 1915)
- 5 July – Lord Woodbine (Harold Adolphus Phillips), calypsonian (born 1929 in Trinidad)
- 8 July – Anne Mueller, civil servant (born 1930)
- 9 July – John Morgan, etiquette expert (suspected suicide) (born 1959)
- 10 July – Justin Pierce, actor and skateboarder (born 1975)
- 11 July
  - Bill Alexander, communist activist and commander of the British Battalion in the Spanish Civil War (born 1910)
  - Robert Runcie, retired Archbishop of Canterbury (born 1921)
- 15 July – Paul Young, singer-songwriter (born 1947)
- 19 July – Owen Maddock, racing car designer (born 1925)
- 21 July – Iain Hamilton, composer (born 1922)
- 22 July – Eric Christmas, actor (born 1916)
- 27 July – Constance Stuart Larrabee, photographer and war correspondent (born 1914)
- 28 July – Margaret Chapman, illustrator (born 1940)
- 30 July – Derek Hill, painter (born 1916)

=== August ===
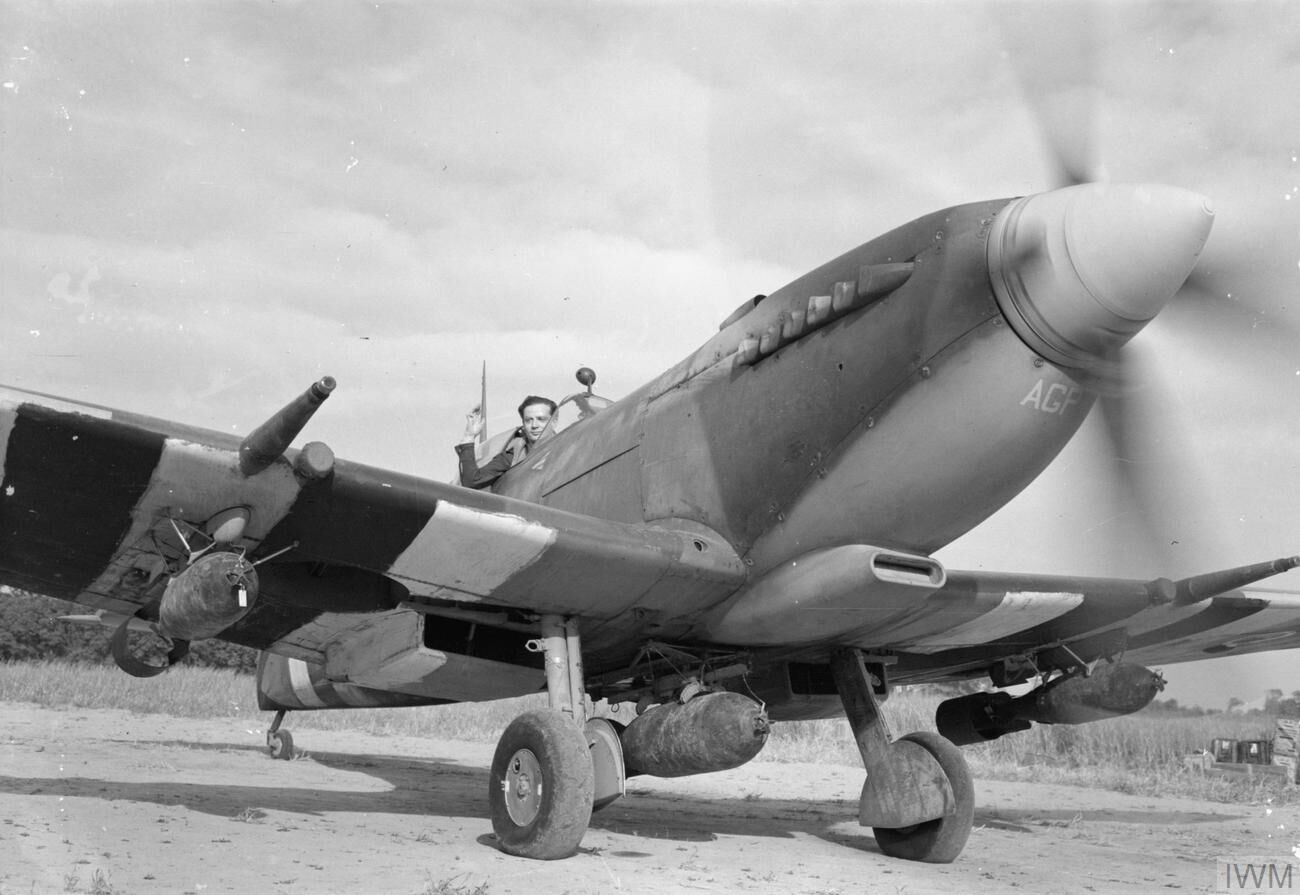
Geoffrey Page in his Spitfire

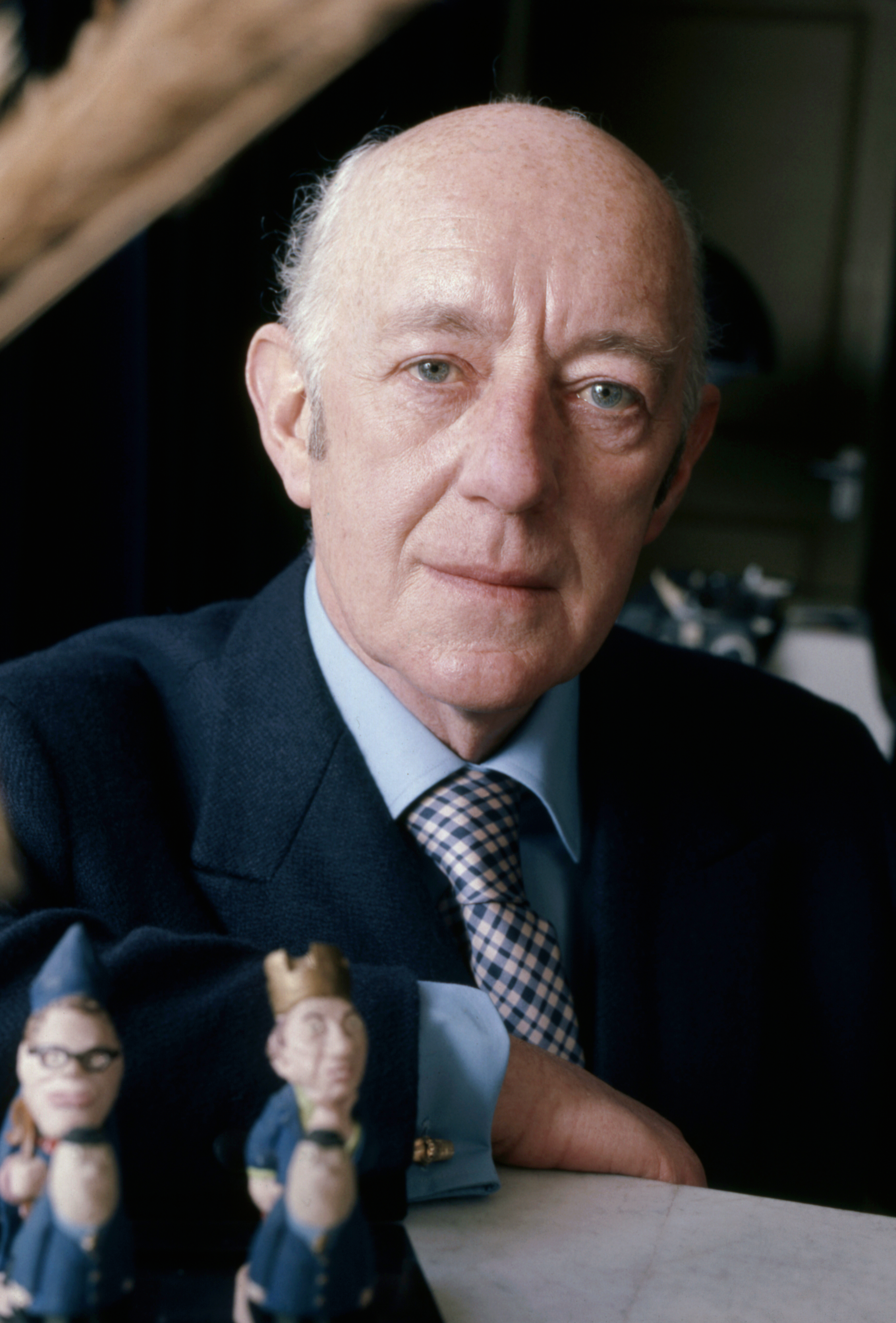
Alec Guinness

- 2 August
  - Trevor Leggett, author and translator (born 1914)
  - Patricia Moyes, mystery writer (born 1923)
- 3 August – Geoffrey Page, World War II air ace (born 1920)
- 5 August – Sir Alec Guinness, actor and writer (born 1914)
- 6 August – Robin Day, political broadcaster (born 1923)
- 10 August – Robert Manuel Cook, classical scholar (born 1909)
- 13 August
  - Edgar Claxton, rail engineer (born 1910)
  - Sir Antony Duff, diplomat and director-general of MI5 (born 1920)
- 15 August
  - Edward Craven Walker, inventor of the lava lamp (born 1918)
  - Lancelot Ware, barrister, biochemist and co-founder of Mensa (born 1915)
- 17 August – Jack Walker, industrialist (born 1929)
- 18 August – Joseph Comerford, engineer (born 1958)
- 20 August – Nancy Evans, opera singer (born 1915)
- 29 August – Shelagh Fraser, actress (born 1920)

=== September ===
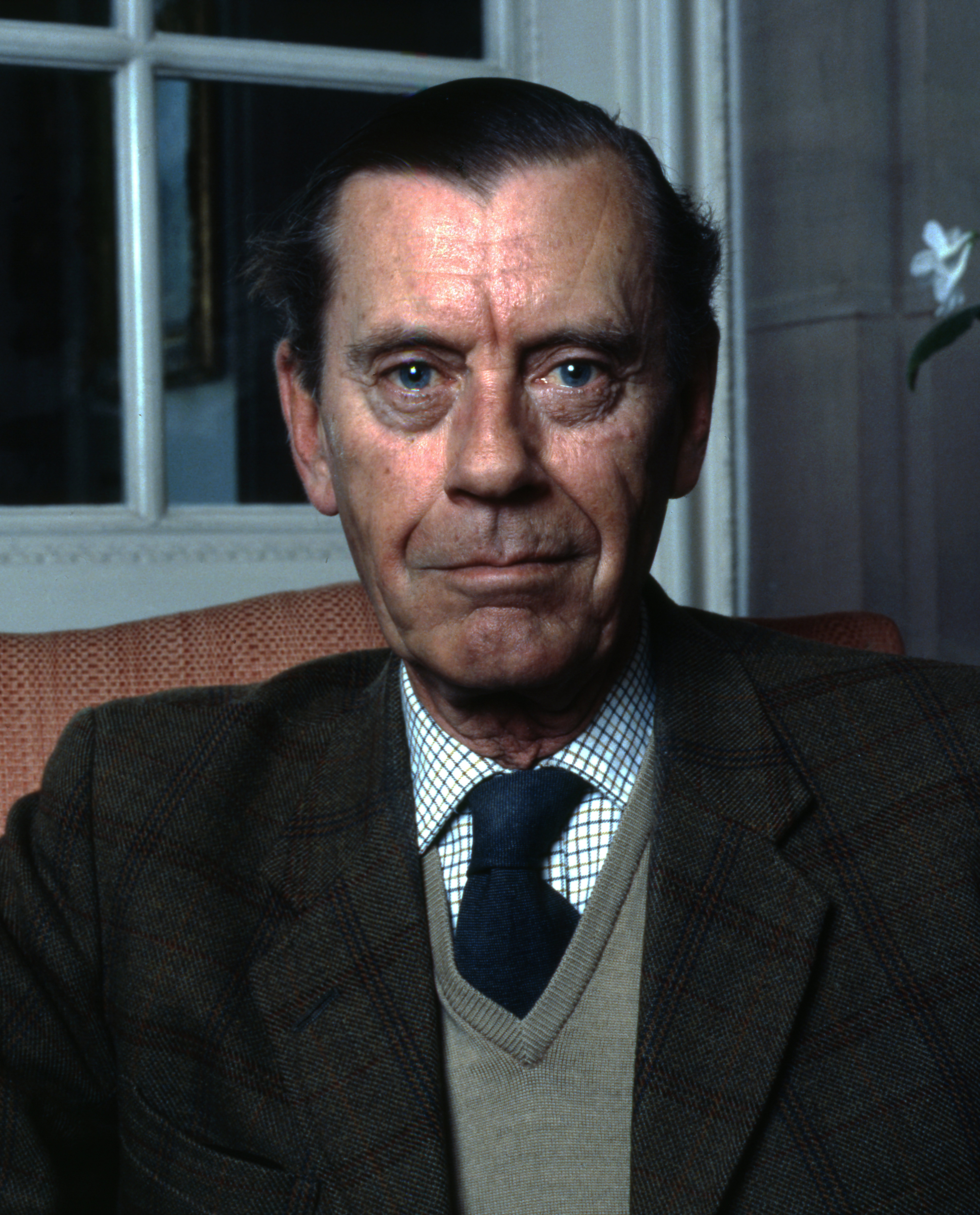
John Egerton, 6th Duke of Sutherland

- 1 September – Barbara Brooke, Baroness Brooke of Ystradfellte, politician (born 1908)
- 2 September – Audrey Wise, politician (born 1935)
- 3 September – Jack Simmons, historian (born 1915)
- 6 September – Desmond Wilcox, journalist and television producer (born 1931)
- 9 September
  - Sir Julian Critchley, journalist and politician (born 1930)
  - Bill Waddington, actor and comedian (born 1916)
- 10 September – Jakie Astor, politician and sportsman (born 1918)
- 12 September – Gary Olsen, actor (born 1957)
- 13 September – Howard Johnson, politician (born 1910)
- 14 September – Frederick Erroll, 1st Baron Erroll of Hale, politician (born 1914)
- 17 September – Paula Yates, television presenter (born 1959)
- 19 September – Anthony Robert Klitz, artist (born 1917)
- 20 September – Mona Moore, illustrator (born 1917)
- 21 September – John Egerton, 6th Duke of Sutherland, peer (born 1915)
- 25 September – R. S. Thomas, poet (born 1913)

=== October ===
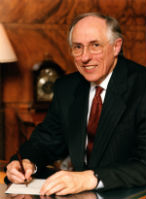
Donald Dewar

- 1 October – Reggie Kray, convicted gangster and murderer, recently released from prison on compassionate grounds after serving more than 30 years of a life sentence (born 1933)
- 5 October – Keith Roberts, science fiction author (born 1935)
- 8 October – Charlotte Lamb, novelist (born 1937)
- 9 October – Patrick Anthony Porteous, recipient of the Victoria Cross (born 1918)
- 11 October – Donald Dewar, First Minister of Scotland (born 1937)
- 17 October – Ivan Owen, voice actor (born 1927)
- 22 October
  - Anthony Chinn, actor (born 1930 in Guyana)
  - Fred Pratt Green, Methodist minister and hymn writer (born 1903)
- 25 October – John Sinclair Morrison, classicist (born 1913)
- 30 October – Elizabeth Bradley, actress (born 1922)

=== November ===
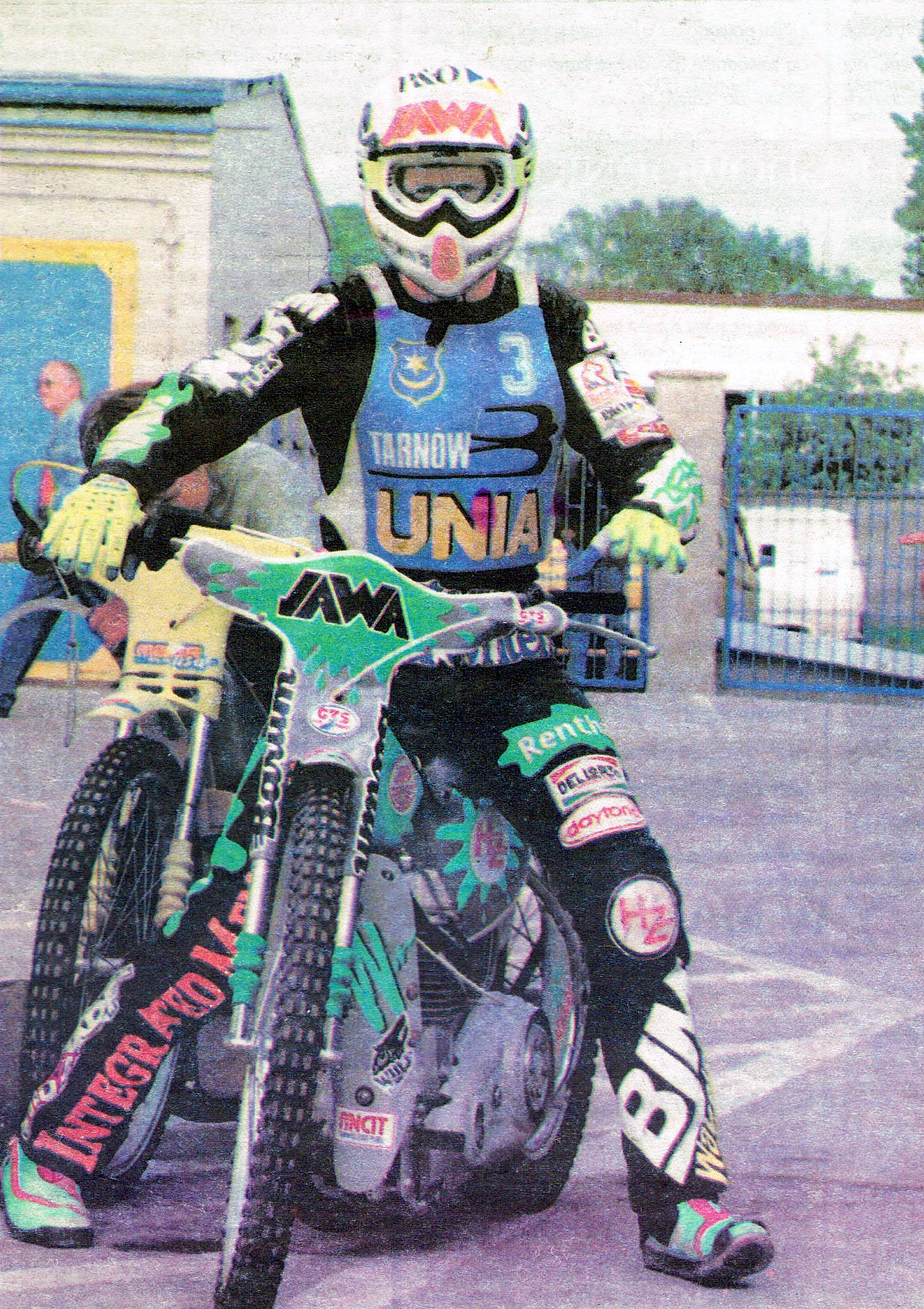
Simon Wigg

- 1 November – Sir Steven Runciman, historian (born 1903)
- 4 November
  - Ian Sneddon, mathematician (born 1919)
  - Stephanie Lawrence, singer and actress (born 1949)
- 8 November – Dick Morrissey, jazz musician (born 1940)
- 9 November
  - Eric Morley, television host (born 1918)
  - Hugh Paddick, actor (born 1915)
- 11 November – William Harris, 6th Earl of Malmesbury, peer (born 1907)
- 15 November
  - Bernard Gadney, English rugby union player (born 1909)
  - Simon Wigg, speedway rider (born 1960)
- 19 November – Jane Shaw, children's author (born 1910)
- 21 November
  - Sir Cyril Clarke, physician and lepidopterist (born 1907)
  - Sir David Croom-Johnson, judge (born 1914)
- 23 November
  - Florence Bell, scientist (born 1913)
  - Rayner Unwin, publisher (born 1925)
- 26 November – Ralph Bates, writer (born 1899)
- 27 November
  - Malcolm Bradbury, author and academic (born 1932)
  - Willie Cunningham, footballer (born 1925)
  - Damilola Taylor
- 28 November – Len Shackleton, footballer and writer (born 1922)

=== December ===
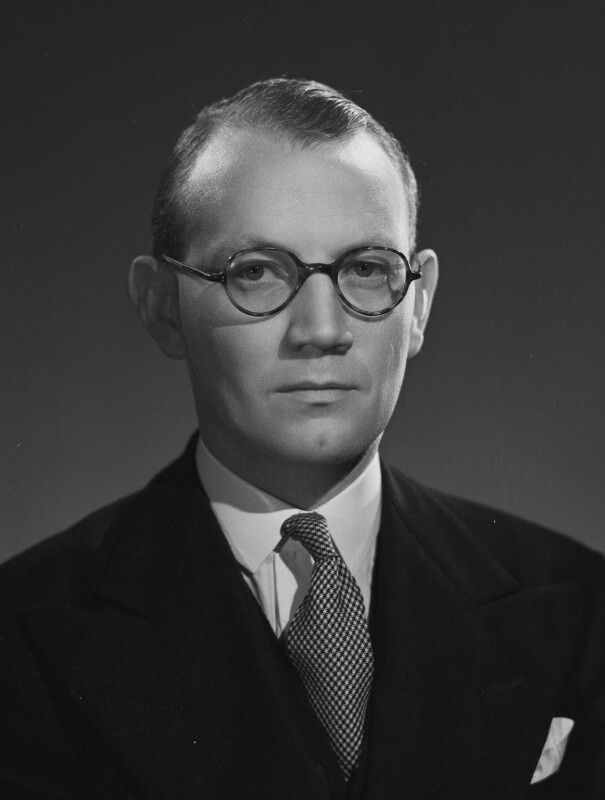
Toby Low, 1st Baron Aldington

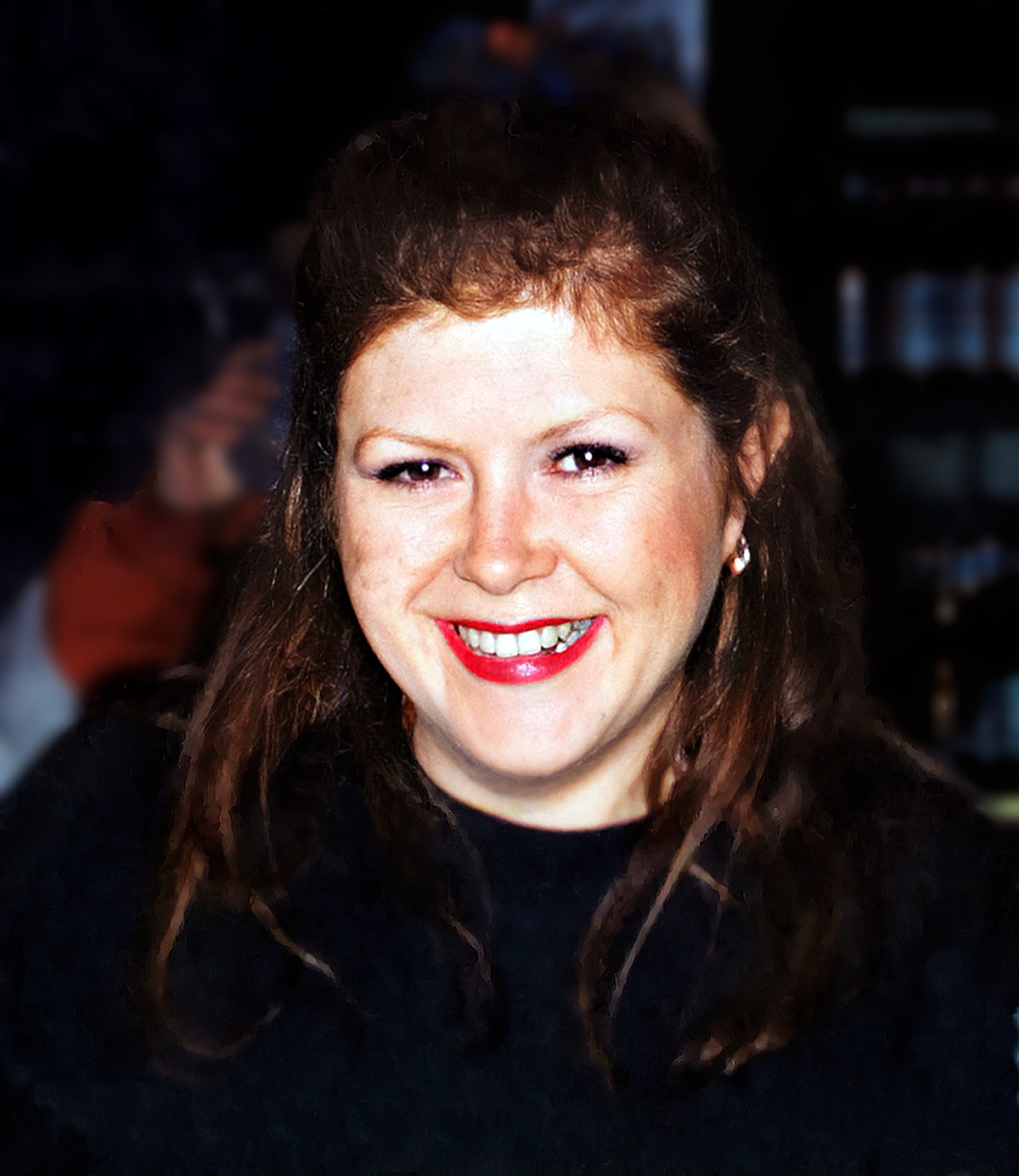
Kirsty MacColl

- 2 December – Arthur Oglesby, writer and fisherman (born 1923)
- 3 December
  - Hugh Edward Richardson, diplomat and Tibetologist (born 1905)
  - Frank Roper, sculptor (born 1914)
- 4 December – Colin Cowdrey, cricketer (born 1932)
- 5 December – O. W. Wolters, academic, historian and author (born 1915)
- 6 December – Chrystabel Leighton-Porter, model (born 1913)
- 7 December – Toby Low, 1st Baron Aldington, politician (born 1914)
- 9 December – Billie Yorke, tennis player (born 1910)
- 12 December – Alastair Graham, zoologist (born 1906)
- 15 December
  - Trevor Adams, actor (born 1946)
  - George Alcock, astronomer (born 1912)
- 18 December – Kirsty MacColl, singer-songwriter (accident in Mexico) (born 1959)
- 19 December – Sir Laurence Whistler, poet and artist (born 1912)
- 20 December – Adrian Henri, poet and painter (born 1932)
- 23 December – Sir Jimmy Shand, musician (born 1908)
- 24 December – John Cooper, car maker (born 1923)
- 26 December – Walter Hayes, journalist (born 1924)
- 27 December – Forbes Howie, businessman (born 1920)
- 28 December
  - William Gardner, coin designer (20p) (born 1914)
  - Charlotte Wilson, voluntary teacher (murdered in Burundi) (born 1973)
- 31 December – Edna Savage, singer (born 1936)

== See also ==
- 2000 in British music
- 2000 in British television
- List of British films of 2000
