= Alan Chambers =

Alan Chambers may refer to:

- Alan Chambers (explorer) (born 1968), British polar adventurer
- Alan Chambers (activist) (born 1972), former President of Exodus International
- Alan Chambers (Canadian politician) (1904–1981), Canadian politician
- Alan Chambers (Northern Ireland politician) (born 1947), Member of the Northern Ireland Assembly
