= 2000 in British radio =

This is a list of events in British radio during 2000.

== Events ==
=== January ===
- 18 January – Sitcom Revolting People opens on BBC Radio 4, set in colonial Baltimore, Maryland around the period of the American Revolutionary War and written by Andy Hamilton with the American Jay Tarses, with Tarses playing sour shopkeeper Samuel Oliphant and Hamilton playing cheerfully corrupt Sergeant Roy McGurk, billeted on him.

=== February ===
- 7 February – Plymouth Sound AM is re-branded Classic Gold 1152 (Plymouth).
- 9 February – Mike Harding presents highlights of the first annual BBC Radio 2 Folk Awards, which were awarded at London's Waldorf Hotel.
- 14 February – BBC Thames Valley FM closes because the station was not popular with listeners, resulting in the return of BBC Radio Berkshire and BBC Radio Oxford. Their programme schedules remain unchanged and most output continues to be shared.
- 17 February – Talk Radio UK is rebranded as Talksport.

=== March ===
- 10 March – Zoë Ball presents the Radio 1 Breakfast Show for the final time. Scott Mills begins a three-week stint as the show's temporary presenter.
- 14 March – Chris Evans sells his Ginger Media Group to SMG plc for £225m. The sale makes Evans the highest paid entertainer in the UK in 2000, estimated by the Sunday Times Rich List to have been paid around £35.5million.
- 27 March – BBC London Live 94.9 replaces GLR. The refreshed station is more speech-focused and becomes the first BBC Local station to broadcast round-the-clock.
- 31 March – Katrina Leskanich presents her last night time show on BBC Radio 2.
- Undated in March – Helen Boaden is appointed as controller of BBC Radio 4.

=== April ===
- 3 April –
  - Sara Cox takes over as presenter of the Radio 1 Breakfast Show.
  - Janice Long begins presenting the night time show on Radio 2.

=== May ===
- 2 May – In Manchester, Lite AM is replaced by BIG 1458 AM.
- 17 May – Virgin Radio is fined £75,000 (the largest penalty imposed by the Radio Authority at this time) for breakfast show presenter Chris Evans's repeated on-air endorsement of Ken Livingstone in the London mayoral elections.
- Undated in May – Capital Radio buys Border Radio Holdings, thereby acquiring the three Century radio stations.

=== June ===
- No events.

=== July ===
- 10 July – Ten 17 changes its name to Ten 17 Mercury.
- Undated in July –
  - Bob Shennan replaces Roger Mosey as Controller of BBC Radio 5 Live.
  - BBC Radio 3 hires Andy Kershaw to host a world music programme, two months after BBC Radio 1 axed his world music show.

=== August ===
- 1 August – ITN launches ITN News Radio. It broadcasts nationally on the recently launched Digital One multiplex.
- 4 August – Radio 1 breakfast show presenter Sara Cox is reprimanded after saying live on air that Queen Elizabeth The Queen Mother "smelt of wee".

=== September ===
- No events.

=== October ===
- 2 October – LBH Radio launches. Broadcasting on MW and Sky Digital, LBH is Britain's first radio station targeting the LGBT community.
- 21 October – The comedian Jack Docherty joins Radio 2 to host Saturday Night Jack, a 13-part series featuring music, reviews and interviews.

=== November ===
- 14 November – The audio relay on DAB of BBC Parliament closes.

=== December ===
- 4 December – FLR 107.3 changes its name to Fusion 107.3FM.
- 20 December – Following the death of singer Kirsty MacColl, Radio 2 have postponed a series she recorded about Cuban music that was due to begin airing on this day. The eight-part series, Kirsty MacColl's Cuba is instead broadcast from 31 January 2001.
- 26 December – Radio 4 clears its Boxing Day schedule in order to broadcast an eight-hour reading of Harry Potter and the Philosopher's Stone, read by Stephen Fry.

== Station debuts ==
- 26 January – Q97.2
- 1 May – 106.3 Bridge FM
- 2 May – Oneword
- 3 May – Choice 107.1
- 29 May – Kick FM
- May – TotalRock
- 26 June – The Groove
- 10 July – Argyll FM
- 25 July – 2BR
- 2 October – LBH Radio
- 3 October – Real Radio Wales
- 16 October – PrimeTime Radio
- Unknown – Source FM

== Programme debuts ==
- January – The Big Booth on BBC Radio 4 (2000–2001)
- 7 January – Dead Ringers on BBC Radio 4 (2000–2007, 2014–Present)
- 18 January – Revolting People on BBC Radio 4 (2000–2006)
- February – BBC Radio 2 Folk Awards on BBC Radio 2 (2000–Present)
- March – The Hudson and Pepperdine Show on BBC Radio 4 (2000–2005)
- May – The Human Zoo on Talksport (2000–2002)
- 3 May – Smelling of Roses on BBC Radio 4 (2000–2003)
- 11 July – Ectoplasm on BBC Radio 4 (2000)
- 3 August – Little Britain on BBC Radio 4 (2000–2002)
- 31 August – Big John @ Breakfast on Hallam FM (2000–Present)
- 21 October – Saturday Night Jack on BBC Radio 2 (2000–2001)
- 19 December – Acropolis Now on BBC Radio 4 (2000–2002)
- Unknown
  - Forty Nights in the Wildebeest on BBC Radio 4 (2000)
  - Sounds of the 70s with Steve Harley on BBC Radio 2 (2000–2008, 2009–Present)

== Continuing radio programmes ==
=== 1940s ===
- Sunday Half Hour (1940–2018)
- Desert Island Discs (1942–Present)
- Letter from America (1946–2004)
- Woman's Hour (1946–Present)
- A Book at Bedtime (1949–Present)

=== 1950s ===
- The Archers (1950–Present)
- The Today Programme (1957–Present)
- Sing Something Simple (1959–2001)
- Your Hundred Best Tunes (1959–2007)

=== 1960s ===
- Farming Today (1960–Present)
- In Touch (1961–Present)
- The World at One (1965–Present)
- The Official Chart (1967–Present)
- Just a Minute (1967–Present)
- The Living World (1968–Present)
- The Organist Entertains (1969–2018)

=== 1970s ===
- PM (1970–Present)
- Start the Week (1970–Present)
- You and Yours (1970–Present)
- I'm Sorry I Haven't a Clue (1972–Present)
- Good Morning Scotland (1973–Present)
- Newsbeat (1973–Present)
- The News Huddlines (1975–2001)
- File on 4 (1977–Present)
- Money Box (1977–Present)
- The News Quiz (1977–Present)
- Feedback (1979–Present)
- The Food Programme (1979–Present)
- Science in Action (1979–Present)

=== 1980s ===
- Steve Wright in the Afternoon (1981–1993, 1999–2022)
- In Business (1983–Present)
- Sounds of the 60s (1983–Present)
- Loose Ends (1986–Present)

=== 1990s ===
- The Moral Maze (1990–Present)
- Essential Selection (1991–Present)
- No Commitments (1992–2007)
- The Pepsi Chart (1993–2002)
- Wake Up to Wogan (1993–2009)
- Essential Mix (1993–Present)
- Up All Night (1994–Present)
- Wake Up to Money (1994–Present)
- Private Passions (1995–Present)
- Parkinson's Sunday Supplement (1996–2007)
- The David Jacobs Collection (1996–2013)
- Westway (1997–2005)
- The 99p Challenge (1998–2004)
- Puzzle Panel (1998–2005)
- Drivetime with Johnnie Walker (1998–2006)
- Sunday Night at 10 (1998–2013)
- In Our Time (1998–Present)
- Material World (1998–Present)
- Scott Mills (1998–2022)
- The Now Show (1998–Present)
- The Attractive Young Rabbi (1999–2002)
- It's Been a Bad Week (1999–2006)
- Jonathan Ross (1999–2010)

== Closing this year ==
- 14 February – BBC Thames Valley FM (1996–2000)
- 28 September – Channel Travel Radio

== Deaths ==
- January 28 – Jean Metcalfe, 76, radio broadcaster
- March 7 – Eileen Fowler, 93, fitness instructor
- April 10 – Peter Jones, 79, comic actor
- August 6 – Sir Robin Day, 76, political broadcaster

== See also ==
- 2000 in British music
- 2000 in British television
- 2000 in the United Kingdom
- List of British films of 2000
