= Big CC Racing =

Motorcycle tuning company

- Company type: Limited
- Industry: Motorsport
- Predecessor: Big CC Motorcycles
- Founded: 1995; 31 years ago
- Founder: Sean Mills
- Headquarters: Wokingham, United Kingdom
- Area served: Worldwide
- Key people: Sean Mills
- Products: Motorcycle turbocharger system
- Services: Performance tuning
- Owner: Sean Mills
- Number of employees: 3
- Website: bigccracing.com

Big CC Racing is a British motorcycle tuning company based in Wokingham, United Kingdom, specialising in custom turbo applications for Suzuki Hayabusa and other motorcycle models.

Big CC Racing creates high performance, but also supports sensible turbo systems for the road with technical knowledge.

== History ==
Sean Mills, the company owner and engineer, is known for building motorcycle engines with a power output of up to 1,000 hp (750 kW).

In 2014, Sean Mills entered the Summer Nationals at Santa Pod Raceway with his Suzuki Hayabusa, where he later set a record in the Competition Bike class in 2017. From 2015 to 2020, Sean Mills made a name for himself in racing under 8.0 seconds.

Before 2018, Sean Mills developed turbocharged motorcycles ranging from 300 hp (220 kW) to 600 hp (450 kW) and has put Zef Eisenberg's 350 hp (260 kW) machine on track at over 201.6 mph (324.4 km/h).

== Other achievements ==
External videos
- Super Mario Hayabusa streetbike 776hp @ 32psi Big CC Racing Built, YouTube video, 2015-12-03. Published by Big CC Racing.
- Super Mario turbo Busa by Big CC Racing 686hp @ 27psi, YouTube video, 2015-11-27. Published by Big CC Racing.

Big CC Racing built a copy of the previously built 1,000 hp (750 kW) motorcycle Project Pisstake and presented a street-legal vehicle, a 1000 hp Hayabusa, with a speed of over 250 mph (400 km/h).

The same motorcycle reached top speeds of over 271.8 mph (437.4 km/h) over a distance of 400 metres in 2018 and 273.4 mph (440.0 km/h) in 2019. Sean Mills may have built the fastest street legal Hayabusa in the world.
