= List of British land speed records =

The British land speed record is the fastest land speed achieved by a vehicle in the United Kingdom, as opposed to one on water or in the air. It is standardised as the speed over a course of fixed length, averaged over two runs in opposite directions.

== Historical records ==
On 25 September 1924, Malcolm Campbell driving the 350 hp Sunbeam Blue Bird set records for the Flying Mile (146.16 m.p.h.) and Flying Kilometre (146.15 m.p.h.) at Pendine Sands, in Wales.

On 21 July 1925, Malcolm Campbell, Sunbeam Blue Bird, at Pendine Sands, broke the records for the Flying Mile (150.76 m.p.h.) and Flying Kilometre (150.86 m.p.h.).

On 16 March 1926, Henry Segrave set the land speed record in his 4-litre Sunbeam Tiger 'Ladybird' on the sands at Southport, England at 152.3 m.p.h. "The mean time for the flying kilometre was 14.6876 seconds equal to 245.11 kilometres per hour, or 152.308 miles per hour." The car suffered supercharger failure during the record run and did not break the mile record.

On 27 April 1926, at Pendine Sands J. G. Parry-Thomas in the Higham-Thomas Special Babs set the Flying Mile record at 168.07 m.p.h. and the Flying Kilometre at 169.29 m.p.h. The following day on 28 April 1926, Parry-Thomas raised the Flying Mile to 170.62 m.p.h. and the Flying Kilometre to 171.01 m.p.h.

On 4 February 1927, Malcolm Campbell set the World Land Speed Record at Pendine Sands covering the Flying Kilometre in a mean average of 174.883 m.p.h. and the Flying Mile in 174.224 m.p.h. on the Napier-Campbell Blue Bird. These also established British records that were to last for many years. The achievement was overshadowed by the death of Parry-Thomas at Pendine Sands on 3 March 1927.

On 3 October 1970, Tony Densham, driving the Ford-powered "Commuter" dragster set a record at Elvington, Yorkshire, averaging 207.6 m.p.h. over the Flying Kilometre course. This broke Campbell's record set 43 years previously.

On 27 April 1977, Robert Horne set a Flying Mile record, at RAF Fairford, Gloucestershire, in the ex-Scuderia Montjuich Ferrari 512M, chassis number 1002, at a speed of 191.64 m.p.h.

On 26/27 September 1992, as publicity for the launch of the Rover 200 Coupe, a group of volunteer Rover employees, supported by many related suppliers, ran 2 specially-prepared Land Speed Record cars and broke 37 UK Land Speed Records at the Millbrook Proving Ground, Bedfordshire. These records included a flying 5 km average speed of 156 mph/251 km/h and a 24-hour average speed of 138 mph/222 km/h. 36 of these records remain unbroken. The activity was referred to as "The Tomcat Affair", in reference to the project's development codename

In October 2013, Paul Drayson, set the electric land speed record reaching an average speed of 205 mph in October 2013.

On 17 May 2014 - Motorcycle - Sam Green, set the first British Electric Motorcycle Land Speed Record at Elvington Airfield in Yorkshire with Saietta R, a British electric urban sports road motorcycle brand, and in partnership with Darvill Racing team. The average record speed achieved was 100.89 mph. The first record attempt saw Saietta R achieve its top speed of 105 mph.

In May 2018 - Motorcycle - Zef Eisenberg, the fastest motorbike on sand was recorded at 201.5 mph over 1.5 miles at Pendine sands in Wales on a supercharged Suzuki Hayabusa. This was a one way record, officiated and recorded by UKTA and the British Record club. Zef Eisenberg also holds the record for World's fastest Turbine bike and Britain's fastest ever naked bike (no fairing) on his Rolls-Royce C20B Turbine powered motorbike with an average speed of 225.75 mph over a mile from a standing start at Elvington Airfield on 17 May 2015. This was recorded by UKTA and Guinness World Records.

On 6 April 2019, Zef Eisenberg, recorded the fastest ever wheel powered flying mile (British Record, not World Record) on a supercharged Suzuki Hayabusa at 182.49 mph at Pendine Sands, exceeded the flying mile record of Idris Elba in 2015 and that of Sir Malcolm Campbell in 1927.

On 17 May 2019, Zef Eisenberg, returned to Pendine with a bespoke ESMOTOR UK Powered 1200 hp Porsche 911 Turbo and on his very first pair of runs, he achieved the following records;

- Fastest sand speed record achieved by a wheel-powered vehicle at 210.332 mph at Pendine Sands.
- Fastest flying quarter (one way) wheel powered record at 206.492 mph, Pendine record (and MSA under 5000cc record).
- Fastest flying mile (one way) wheel powered record at 196.970 mph, Pendine record (and MSA under 5000cc record).
- Fastest flying mile (2 way) 187.962 mph (same measurement as Sir Malcolm Campbell), Pendine record
- As of 2019, Zef Eisenberg, is the only person in history to have achieved over 200 mph on bike and car at Pendine, and a flying mile record in bike and car in Britain, and the only person to hold car and bike records, other than John Surtees.

== Non wheel-driven vehicles ==
On 25 September 1980 Thrust2 driven by Richard Noble broke the Flying Mile record at a speed of 248.87 mph and the Flying Kilometre at 251.190 mph. at RAF Greenham Common.

In the summer of 1998, Colin Fallows bettered Richard Noble's outright UK Record in his Vampire jet dragster at an average speed of 269 mph at Elvington, Yorkshire. Mark Newby raised this to 272 mph in Split Second in July 2000 but Colin Fallows raised the record again on the same day using Vampire to record an average speed of 300.3 mph with a peak of 329 mph.

On 7 July 2006, Colin Fallows raised this 300.3 mph average speed again by 1 mph with an each-way average of 301 mph at RAF Fairford in Vampire. His peak speed was 331 mph. At the same event at RAF Fairford on 7 July 2006, Mark Newby drove his jet car Split Second to an MSA/FIA accredited average speed of 338.74 mph with a peak of 362 mph, the fastest speed ever recorded in the UK. The car was unable to make a return run so the one-way record remains an unofficial one. Just weeks beforehand, at a media and testing day at Bruntingthorpe Proving Ground, Newby had posted an average speed of 335mph despite encountering handling problems, timed by the same MSA Timekeeping team that were present at RAF Fairford in July. (Sources: UK Speed Record Club, FAST Facts. RACMSA)

On 20 September 2006, Top Gear presenter Richard Hammond is claimed by the BBC to have reached a peak speed of 314 mph (505 km/h) whilst being taught to drive the Vampire jet car. It was not a record attempt and was held on a greatly shortened course (600 yards under power compared to more than 1,300 yards under power for the official record attempts by Fallows and Newby) and no recognised official MSA or FIA Accredited timekeeping was in place. The claimed speed was obtained from the BBC's own on-board equipment.

== See also ==
- Land speed record
