= List of British films of 2000 =

A list of British films released in 2000:

Title	Director	Cast	Genre	Notes
Aberdeen	Hans Petter Moland	Stellan Skarsgård, Lena Headey, Charlotte Rampling	Drama	Co-production with Sweden
The Asylum	John Stewart	Steffanie Pitt, Nick Waring, Ingrid Pitt	Horror	
The Beach	Danny Boyle	Leonardo DiCaprio, Tilda Swinton, Robert Carlyle	Drama	
Beautiful Joe	Stephen Metcalfe	Sharon Stone, Billy Connolly	Comedy/drama	
Best	Mary McGuckian	John Lynch, Ian Bannen	Sports/biopic	
Billy Elliot	Stephen Daldry	Jamie Bell, Gary Lewis, Julie Walters	Drama	
Blood	Charly Cantor	Adrian Rawlins, Lee Blakemore	Horror	
Borstal Boy	Peter Sheridan	Shawn Hatosy, Danny Dyer	Drama	
Bread and Roses	Ken Loach	Pilar Padilla, Adrien Brody	Drama	Entered into the 2000 Cannes Film Festival
Breathtaking	David Green	Joanne Whalley, Lorraine Pilkington	Thriller	
Chicken Run	Nick Park	Julia Sawalha, Mel Gibson, Miranda Richardson	Animated comedy	Co-production with France and the US
Chocolat	Lasse Hallström	Juliette Binoche, Judi Dench	Romance	
The Claim	Michael Winterbottom	Peter Mullan, Milla Jovovich	Western/romance	
Complicity	Gavin Millar	Jonny Lee Miller, Brian Cox	Drama	
The Contender	Rod Lurie	Gary Oldman, Joan Allen, Jeff Bridges, Christian Slater, William Petersen, Philip Baker Hall, Saul Rubinek, Sam Elliott	Political drama	American-German-British co-production
Essex Boys	Terry Winsor	Sean Bean, Alex Kingston	Crime drama	
Esther Kahn	Arnaud Desplechin	Summer Phoenix, Ian Holm, Fabrice Desplechin	Period drama	
Five Seconds to Spare	Tom Connolly	Andy Serkis, Ray Winstone	Thriller	
Gangster No. 1	Paul McGuigan	Malcolm McDowell, Paul Bettany	Crime drama	
Gladiator	Ridley Scott	Russell Crowe, Oliver Reed	Drama	
The Golden Bowl	James Ivory	Kate Beckinsale, James Fox	Literary drama	
Greenfingers	Joel Hershman	Helen Mirren, Clive Owen	Comedy	
Honest	David A. Stewart	Peter Facinelli	Crime	Screened at Cannes
Hotel Splendide	Terence Gross	Toni Collette, Daniel Craig	Comedy	
House!	Julian Kemp	Kelly Macdonald, Jason Hughes	Comedy	
Kevin & Perry Go Large	Ed Bye	Harry Enfield, Kathy Burke, Rhys Ifans	Comedy	TV spin-off
Kiss Kiss (Bang Bang)	Stewart Sugg	Stellan Skarsgård, Chris Penn	Comedy	
Liam	Stephen Frears	Ian Hart, Claire Hackett, Anthony Borrows	Drama	
Love, Honour and Obey	Dominic Anciano, Ray Burdis	Jonny Lee Miller, Jude Law	Crime	
Love's Labour's Lost	Kenneth Branagh	Kenneth Branagh, Nathan Lane, Adrian Lester	Shakespearean	
Mad About Mambo	John Forte	William Ash, Keri Russell	Romantic comedy	Co-production with Ireland
The Man Who Cried	Sally Potter	Christina Ricci, Cate Blanchett, Johnny Depp	Drama	
Maybe Baby	Ben Elton	Hugh Laurie, Joely Richardson	Romantic comedy	
Monarch	John Walsh	T. P. McKenna, Jean Marsh	Historical Dram	
No Maps for These Territories	Mark Neale	William Gibson, Jack Womack	Documentary	
Nora	Pat Murphy	Ewan McGregor, Susan Lynch	Drama	Co-production with Germany, Italy and Ireland
One of the Hollywood Ten	Karl Francis	Jeff Goldblum, Greta Scacchi	Drama	Co-production with Spain
Out of Depth	Simon Marshall	Sean Maguire, Danny Midwinter	Thriller	
Pandaemonium	Julien Tempe	Linus Roache, John Hannah	Biopic	
Paranoid	John Duigan	Jessica Alba, Iain Glen	Drama	
Purely Belter	Mark Herman	Chris Beattie, Greg McLane	Comedy/drama	
Quills	Philip Kaufman	Geoffrey Rush, Kate Winslet, Joaquin Phoenix	Historical drama	
Relative Values	Eric Styles	Julie Andrews, Colin Firth	Comedy	
Sabotage!	Esteban Ibarretxe, Jose Miguel Ibarretxe	David Suchet, Stephen Fry	Comedy	Co-production with Spain and France
Saving Grace	Nigel Cole	Brenda Blethyn, Craig Ferguson	Comedy	
Sexy Beast	Jonathan Glazer	Ray Winstone, Ben Kingsley	Crime/thriller	
A Shot at Glory	Michael Corrente	Robert Duvall, Michael Keaton	Sport	
Small Time Obsession	Piotr Szkopiak	Jason Merrells, Juliette Caton, Alex King, Kirsten Parker, Oliver Young, Richard Banks, Geoff Lawson, Giles Ward, Jurek Jarosz, Teresa Nowakowska, Andrew Tiernan	Drama	
Snatch	Guy Ritchie	Jason Statham, Stephen Graham, Brad Pitt	Heist/thriller	
Some Voices	Simon Cellan Jones	Daniel Craig, David Morrissey	Comedy/drama	
There's Only One Jimmy Grimble	John Hay	Lewis McKenzie, Gina McKee, Ray Winstone	Sports/drama	
Thomas and the Magic Railroad	Britt Allcroft	Peter Fonda, Mara Wilson, Alec Baldwin, Eddie Glen, Neil Crone	Family	
Up at the Villa	Philip Haas	Kristin Scott Thomas, Sean Penn	Drama	
When the Sky Falls	John Mackenzie	Joan Allen, Patrick Bergin	Crime	Co-production with the Republic of Ireland

== See also ==
- 2000 in film
- 2000 in British music
- 2000 in British radio
- 2000 in British television
- 2000 in the United Kingdom
- List of 2000 box office number-one films in the United Kingdom
