= 2000 in British music =

This is a summary of 2000 in music in the United Kingdom.

== Events ==
- 1 January – British composer John Tavener is knighted in the New Year's Honours List.
- 11 January
  - Gary Glitter is released from jail, two months before the end of his sentence for sexual offences.
  - Sharon Osbourne quits as manager of Smashing Pumpkins after only three months. In a brash press release she announces she had to resign "for medical reasons: Billy Corgan was making me sick".
- 16 February – The Silver Tassie, an opera by Mark-Anthony Turnage, receives its première at the London Coliseum, performed by the English National Opera.
- 24 February – Italian motorcycle manufacturing company Aprilia wins a lawsuit filed against the Spice Girls over a sponsorship deal that fell apart when Geri Halliwell left the group.
- 28 March – Jimmy Page wins a lawsuit filed against Ministry magazine, which claimed that Page had contributed to the death of Led Zeppelin drummer John Bonham by wearing a Satanic robe and chanting spells while Bonham was dying. The magazine apologises and offers to pay Page's legal bills. Page donates the money received from the case to the Action for Brazil's Children Trust.
- 4 April – Mick Jagger attends the opening of an arts centre named after him at Dartford Grammar School in southeast London.
- 5 May – Rod Stewart undergoes an hour-long throat operation at Cedars-Sinai Medical Center in Los Angeles to remove a growth on his thyroid, which turns out to be benign.
- 13 May – The 45th Eurovision Song Contest final is held in Stockholm's Globe Arena. The UK entry, "Don't Play That Song Again", performed by Nicki French, finishes in sixteenth place, the worst-ever showing for a UK entry up to that time.
- 21–22 July – Oasis play two nights at Wembley Stadium. A recording of the first night's performance is later included on the double CD and the DVD Familiar to Millions (2000).
- 18 December – Singer-songwriter Kirsty McColl is killed in a speedboat accident while on holiday in Mexico. She was 41.
- 22 December – Madonna marries film director Guy Ritchie at Skibo Castle in Dornoch, Sutherland, Scotland, with Gwyneth Paltrow, Stella McCartney, Sting, George Clooney, Jon Bon Jovi, Celine Dion, Bryan Adams, and Rupert Everett among those in attendance.

== Classical music ==
=== New works ===
- Thomas Adès – Piano Quintet, op. 20
- Julian Anderson – Alhambra Suite, for chamber orchestra
- Edward Cowie
  - Bad Lands Gold, for tuba and piano
  - Concerto for oboe and orchestra
  - Dark Matter, for brass ensemble
  - Elysium IV, for orchestra
  - Four Frames in a Row, for high voice and baroque ensemble
  - The Healing of Saul, for violin and harp (or piano)
  - Several Charms, for violin and piano
- Peter Maxwell Davies
  - Symphony No. 7
  - Symphony No. 8 Antarctica
- James MacMillan – Mass, for choir and organ
- Roger Smalley – String Quartet No. 2
- John Tavener – Song of the Cosmos

=== Opera ===
- Peter Maxwell Davies – Mr Emmet Takes a Walk
- Jake Heggie – Dead Man Walking
- Michael Nyman – Facing Goya
- Richard Thomas – Tourette's Diva

=== Albums ===
- Peter Donohoe – Walton with Maggini String Quartet
- Simon Keenlyside – The Songs of Robert Schumann, Vol. 02
- Nigel Kennedy – Kennedy Plays Bach

== Film and TV scores and incidental music ==
=== Film ===
- Charlie Mole – Paranoid
- John Murphy – Snatch
- Rachel Portman – Chocolat
- Stephen Warbeck
  - Billy Elliot
  - Quills

=== Television ===
- Richard Rodney Bennett – Gormenghast (nominated for Ivor Novello Awards)
- Simon Brint with Kenny G – Monarch of the Glen

== Musical films ==
- Love's Labour's Lost, directed by and starring Kenneth Branagh, music by Patrick Doyle

== Music awards ==
=== BRIT Awards ===
The 2000 BRIT Awards winners were:

- Best selling live act: Steps
- Best soundtrack: Notting Hill
- British album: Travis – The Man Who
- British breakthrough act: S Club 7
- British dance act: The Chemical Brothers
- British female solo artist: Beth Orton
- British group: Travis
- British male solo artist: Tom Jones
- British single: Robbie Williams – "She's the One"
- British video: Robbie Williams – "She's the One"
- International breakthrough act: Macy Gray
- International female: Macy Gray
- International group: TLC
- International male: Beck
- Outstanding contribution: Spice Girls
- Pop act: Five

=== Mercury Music Prize ===
The 2000 Mercury Music Prize was awarded to Badly Drawn Boy – The Hour of Bewilderbeast.

=== Record of the Year ===
The Record of the Year was awarded to "My Love" by Westlife

== Births ==
- 3 June – Beabadoobee, singer-songwriter
- 9 August – Arlo Parks, singer and poet

== Deaths ==
- 17 March – Cab Kaye, jazz singer and pianist, 78
- 27 March – Ian Dury, rock musician, 57 (liver cancer)
- 7 February – Dave Peverett, singer and guitarist of Foghat, 56 (cancer)
- 13 April – Inglis Gundry, composer, novelist and musicologist, 94
- 2 May – Billy Munn, jazz pianist, 88
- 6 May – Leonard Salzedo, conductor and composer, 78
- 20 May – Wilfred Heaton, composer, conductor and teacher, 81
- 1 June – Eric Gilder, pianist, conductor, composer and musicologist, 88
- 15 July – Paul Young, singer and percussionist of Sad Café and Mike + The Mechanics, 53 (heart attack)
- 21 July – Iain Hamilton, composer, 78
- 20 August – Nancy Evans, operatic mezzo-soprano, 85
- 25 September – Tommy Reilly, Canadian-born harmonica player, 81
- 22 October – Fred Pratt Green, Methodist minister and hymnwriter, 97
- 3 November – Robert Sherlaw Johnson, pianist, composer and music writer, 68
- 8 November – Dick Morrissey, tenor saxophonist, 60 (cancer)
- 16 November – Russ Conway, pianist, 75
- 18 December – Kirsty McColl, singer-songwriter, 41 (speedboat accident)
- 23 December – Jimmy Shand, accordionist ("The Bluebell Polka"), 92
- 24 December – Allan Smethurst ("The Singing Postman"), 73

== See also ==
- 2000 in British music charts
- 2000 in British radio
- 2000 in British television
- 2000 in the United Kingdom
- List of British films of 2000
