= Charlie Paton =

British explorer (born 1970)

Charlie Paton (born 1970) is a former Royal Marine and personal trainer, who was the first Scottish man to walk unsupported to the Geographic North Pole from Canada. At 11:16pm on 16 May 2000, after 70 days on the ice led by Alan Chambers, Paton raised the Union Jack at the Pole. The ten-week expedition arrived ten days overdue, suffering weight loss and without food supplies.
