= Victor Serebriakoff =

British writer (1912–2000)

- Born: 17 October 1912; Camberwell, London, UK
- Died: 1 January 2000 (aged 87)
- Spouses: Mary Serebriakoff; Win Rouse

Victor Serebriakoff (17 October 1912 – 1 January 2000) was one of the early members of Mensa. Serebriakoff is known for his contributions to lumber technology, writing intelligence quotient (IQ) tests, as well as organising and promoting Mensa.

== Family background ==
Victor Serebriakoff was born in Camberwell, south London, the eldest son of Vladimir and Ethel Serebriakoff (née Graham). Eventually, the family had five daughters and two sons. Vladimir's father was Esper Serebriakoff, who married Katherine Seitelman. Esper joined the Russian navy in 1870, but left in 1885 after rising to the rank of lieutenant, having become involved in revolutionary politics, leaving Russia in 1888. Esper's father, Alexander, was a lieutenant colonel in the Russian army.

== Accomplishments ==
After leaving the army in 1947 he worked in the timber industry, becoming known for introducing automatic grading of timber for strength, eventually selling machines worldwide. In the 1970s he led a British delegation to a timber metrification conference in the Soviet Union.

Serebriakoff wrote prolifically on the timber trade, Mensa and its history, and educating gifted children. He also wrote puzzle books. Many of his works were translated. He took greatest pride in his book Brain in which he set out a theory of how the brain operates.

== Mensa ==
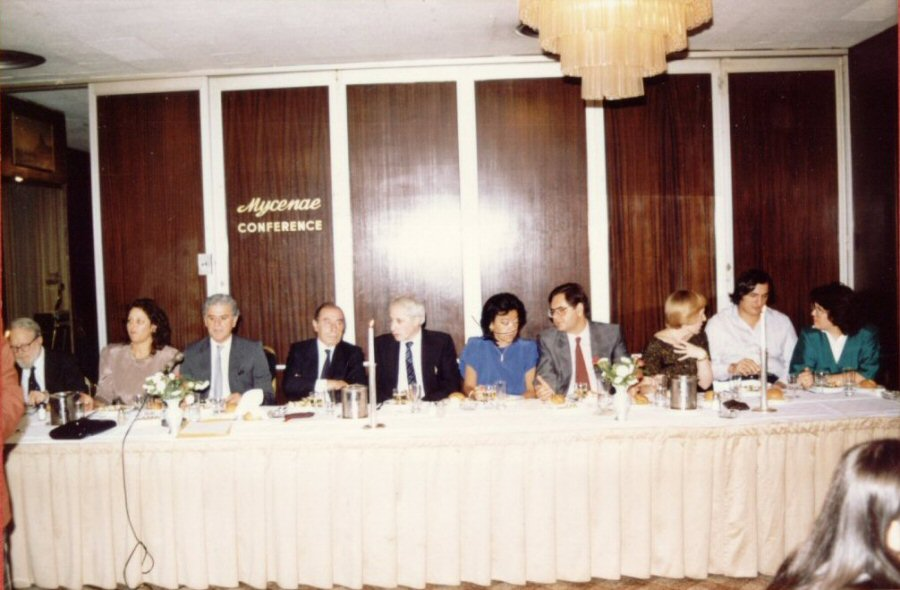
Photograph from the 1988 Mensa IBD meeting that took place in Athens with Victor Serebriakoff, Mrs and Mr Nikos Anagnostatos Vice-president of Mensa Greece on the left edge of the photograph, Amy Shaughnessy Chairman of American Mensa, Theodoros Natsinas Chairman of Mensa Greece and Kiki Florou Secretary General of Mensa Greece, on the right edge of the photograph.)

His first wife, Mary, encouraged Serebriakoff to join Mensa in 1949, when the number of members was only a few hundred. Initially, he wasn't heavily involved. Victor suffered a bereavement when Mary was found to have tongue cancer. She died in July 1952 after just 3 years of marriage and two children.

Win Rouse, a Lady Almoner or hospital social worker (and ex-Bletchley Park staff), had helped Victor and Mary during the illness. By coincidence, she was a member of Mensa, having met Victor at meetings. After Mary died, they eventually became a couple and married in October 1953.

Victor became active in promoting Mensa. He and Win evaluated I.Q. tests at their home in Blackheath, London, and organised the Mensa annual general meeting from there. He was also a principal of the lively Blackheath Poetry Society in the 1950s, and a prolific author of light verse. Eventually Mensa could support paid staff, leading to National Mensa organisations starting in many countries. Victor often publicised Mensa in the worldwide media through the 1960s, '70s, and '80s.

Victor was elected International President of Mensa, an office that he held at his death.

== Bibliography ==
- British Sawmill Practice.
- IQ: A Mensa Analysis & History. Mensa. 1965.
- How Intelligent Are You? – Test Your Own IQ. New American Library. 1968.
- How Intelligent Are You?. Signet. 1972. ISBN 9780451133359.
- Brain. Davis-Poynter. 1975. ISBN 9780706701050.
- Test Your Child's I.Q. D. McKay Co. 1977. ISBN 9780679506720.
- A Mensa Puzzle Book (or Problems, Posers, Puzzles & Pastimes for the Superintelligent). Frederick Muller Ltd. 1982. ISBN 9780584110203.
- Puzzles, Problems, and Pastimes for the Superintelligent. Prentice-Hall. 1983. ISBN 9780137446568.
- Second Mensa Puzzle Book. Frederick Muller. 1985. ISBN 9780584111217.
- A Second Mensa Puzzle Book. Chancellor Press. 1993. ISBN 9781851523849.
- The Mensa Puzzle Book: 200 Puzzles, Posers and Problems to Keep You Guessing. Bounty Books. 1991. ISBN 9781850516903.
- Mensa: The Society for the Highly Intelligent. Stein and Day. 1986. ISBN 9780812830910.
- The Thinking Person's Book of Puzzles & Problems. Dell. 1987. ISBN 9780440587491.
- The Future of Intelligence: Biological and Artificial. Parthenon Publishing Group. 1987. ISBN 9780940813021.
- A Guide to Intelligence and Personality Testing: Including Actual Tests and Answers. Parthenon Publishing Group. 1988. ISBN 9781850701859.
- Test Your I.Q. Hamlyn. 1990. ISBN 9780600568773.
- Test Your I.Q. Bounty Books. 1993. ISBN 9781851523696.
- The Mammoth Book of Puzzles. Robinson Publishing. 1992. ISBN 9781854871145.
- The Mammoth Book of Astounding Puzzles. Carroll & Graf. 1992. ISBN 9780881848564.
- The Mammoth Book of Mindbending Puzzles. Carroll & Graf. 1995. ISBN 9780786702800.
- The Giant Book of Puzzles. Magpie. 1994. ISBN 9781854873682.
- Self-Scoring IQ Tests. Sterling. 1996. ISBN 9780760701645.
- Self-Scoring IQ Tests for Children. Barnes & Noble Books. 1996. ISBN 9780760701638.
- Self-Scoring Personality Tests. Sterling. 1996. ISBN 9780760701621.
- How Intelligent Are You?. Barnes & Noble Books. 1998. ISBN 9781854872517.
- How Intelligent Are You? – The Universal IQ Tests. Barnes & Noble Books. 1998. ISBN 9780760710203.

=== Translated ===
- Testen Sie Ihren IQ.
- A guide to intelligence and personality testing : including actual tests and answers. NJ: Parthenon Pub. Group. 1988.
