= Vampire (car) =

Jet-propelled car in England

The Vampire is a jet-propelled car that currently holds the outright British land speed record, driven by Colin Fallows to a speed of 300.3 mph (483.3 km/h) on 5 July 2000 at Elvington, Yorkshire, England.

Vampire is one of two near-identical dragsters built to be raced at the Santa Pod Raceway in 1980, the other being named Hellbender. Measuring 30 feet (9.1 m) long, it consumes between 7 and 10 UK gallons of fuel per mile and delivers 2,500 pounds of thrust without the afterburner or 5,500 pounds of thrust with it lit.

The vehicle is powered by a Rolls-Royce Orpheus turbojet engine from an ex-Red Arrows Folland Gnat paired to the afterburner from a Jaguar fighter's Rolls-Royce Turbomeca Adour turbofan. It can accelerate from standstill to 272 mph (438 km/h) in six seconds, a personal best set at Santa Pod Raceway.

Vampire was originally constructed by Allan 'Bootsie' Herridge, a pioneer British drag racer, as one of a pair of identical match-race jet dragsters in 1981. The sister car "Hellbender" was involved in a crash in 1986 at Santa Pod, in which Mark Woodley, an experienced dragster driver, was killed.

Vampire crashed in 2006 during shooting of a segment for the television show Top Gear, severely injuring its driver, Top Gear presenter Richard Hammond. The accident occurred as a result of a loss of control caused by a failure in the front-right wheel. Hammond's peak speed from several test runs was higher than the official British land speed record, recording a top speed of 314 mph (505 km/h). However, he did not officially break the British record as, according to the rules, two runs in different directions and an independent observer are required. Hammond crashed on his seventh run. Hammond's co-presenter, Jeremy Clarkson, joked that Hammond would have created the record for the fastest crash but would have needed to repeat the crash in the opposite direction.

In December 2007, the damaged vehicle went up for sale as scrap on eBay UK.

After an extensive restoration and recommissioning, Vampire made its first appearance since the 2006 crash at the Bromyard Speed Festival at Shelsley Walsh Hill Climb in August 2021.

In January 2022, DriveTribe published a video on their YouTube channel saying goodbye to 2021 and ahead to 2022, when at the end of the video Richard Hammond got into Vampire once again. A week later, DriveTribe published a follow-up video where Mike Fernie, their content editor, started up Vampire.
