= Alan Chambers (explorer) =

British polar explorer (born 1968)

- Born: 1968 (age 57–58); U.K.
- Occupations: Polar adventurer and motivational speaker

Alan Chambers MBE (born 1968) is a polar adventurer and motivational speaker from Scunthorpe, North Lincolnshire.

Born to a family of steel workers, Alan left school and home at sixteen and joined the Royal Marines. Nine months later he completed training and spent the next seventeen years in a front line Commando unit. Alan recalls visiting 50 countries by the time he was 30 years old.

Chambers led the first British team to walk unsupported to the Geographic North Pole from Canada. After 70 days on the ice, he and Charlie Paton raised the Union Jack at the North Pole at 23:16 hours on 16 May 2000.

Chambers was also instrumental in planning and executing the first Winter crossing of Iceland on skis. Dragging sledges each weighing 240 pounds (110 kg), Chambers and his team completed the 500 miles (800 km) journey in 47 days.

Aged 32, Chambers was awarded the MBE by Her Majesty the Queen for Determined Leadership in Constant Adversity.

In January 2025, Alan led the Mission Spiritus Oman Expedition.

Chambers is a popular motivational and corporate away day speaker on topics including Leading at the Edge, Maintaining Team High Performance, Delivering the Impossible, Managing Adversity, Leadership and Resilience and Setbacks and Doing More with Less.
