= Zef Eisenberg =

British motorcycle racer

- Born: 22 March 1973; Merton, London, England
- Died: 1 October 2020 (aged 47); RAF Elvington, Yorkshire, England
- Cause of death: Car speed record crash
- Known for: Founder, Maximuscle
- Spouse: Marni Alexander

Ze'ev "Zef" Eisenberg (22 March 1973 – 1 October 2020) was the British founder of sports nutrition brand Maximuscle, an ultra-speed motorbike racer and television presenter.

Eisenberg founded the sports nutrition brand Maximuscle in 1995. He held over 70 British and world land speed records, including a Guinness World Record. They include the world's fastest turbine bike (234 mph); the UK's fastest (no-fairing) 'naked' bike (225.6 mph); world's fastest motorbike racer on sand at 201.5 mph; Britain's fastest-ever motorcycle crash at over 230 mph; fastest ever wheel powered vehicle in a 1,500 hp Porsche at Pendine Sands at 210.33 mph, and fastest electric motorbike in the world (unfaired) with a 197 mph GPS peak speed.

Eisenberg was presenter for the TV series Speed Freaks, a six episode production on ITV4, produced by Keshet, and appeared on several other TV shows, including The Motorbike Show with Henry Cole and Zef's famous Madmax Turbine bike.

Eisenberg died on 1 October 2020 aged 47, when his car flipped and crashed while attempting a British land speed record at RAF Elvington, Yorkshire.

== Early life and career ==
Born in Merton in south London, Eisenberg left school at 15 after his GCSEs to take a job in a health shop. A competitive bodybuilder at the time, Eisenberg said he took the job to get discounts on nutritional supplements.

While working at the store, Eisenberg wrote a monthly newsletter on the science of nutrition and, in 1993, self-published a book on the same topic. Eisenberg used the profits from the book to start supplying protein supplements to other bodybuilders.

Eisenberg was a fully qualified senior gym instructor, specialising in nutrition and conducted two years of endocrinological research at the British Medical Research Centre and Pharmaceutical Association.

Eisenberg went to a design and technology college in Barnet, north London, after doing his GCSEs. During his GCSEs, he was sponsored by Digital for a new XY axis robot, when just 15 years of age for one of his Technology GCSE projects. He further featured in the Sunday Times for his rear-wheel engine powered cycle. Even though Eisenberg confessed to being self-taught in the world of engineering, welding, tuning and engines, he trained and achieved his certification at H&S Rolls-Royce Portsmouth for the C250 series turbines, as used in his world record setting land speed motorbike.

== Business ==
=== Maximuscle ===
In 1995, Eisenberg founded sports nutrition brand Maximuscle with £3,000. Initially supplying whey-based supplements, the company's product range grew to include drink powders, edible gels, and protein bars.

Maximuscle was the first UK sports nutrition brand to have its products screened under World Anti-Doping Agency rules.

In 2010, Maximuscle was selling £80 million worth of products per year. In 2011, GlaxoSmithKline (GSK) bought Maximuscle for £162 million. At the time, Maximuscle was Europe's best-selling sports nutrition brand. Eisenberg continued on in a consultancy role with GSK for Maximuscle. The German food giant Krüger bought Maximuscle from GSK in January 2018.

=== Maxicorp ===
Eisenberg ran Guernsey-based Maxicorp. The company is active in property investment, autosports racing, and engineering.

The property business has bought and sold properties worth around £210 million in London, the Channel Islands and Gibraltar. It bought BBC Villers House in 2012 for £16 million, with plans to develop Ealing Broadway Crossrail station, office block and retail.

The engineering autosports arm builds bespoke high-speed vehicles. It also designed and manufactured the Eisenberg V8, the world's smallest and lightest V8 engine motorbike. The Madmax ultra-speed motorbike race team is part of Maxicorp. Maxicorp is the registered trademark holder of Eisenberg and Madmax in the UK and EU.

=== Madmax Race Team ===
Eisenberg set up Madmax Race Team in 2011 from Guernsey. The Madmax is a specialised engineering team that develop motorbikes, cars, quads, and land speed vehicles. The Madmax Race Team is behind multiple world land speed records on bikes, quads, and cars, with over 50 land speed, British, world, and Guinness records to its name, including the world's fastest electric unfaired bike.

=== Electric Motorbike Racing ===
Eisenberg, who was a long time fan of the Isle of Man TT, sponsored three times IOM TT podium winner Daley Mathison and Dr Miguel Gimeno Fabra on the Nottingham of University (NOU) Electric motorbike under the Zero TT class for 2019. The NOU bike had been designed to be more powerful and capable than all its previous years. The day before Madmax Team rider Daley Mathison was meant to ride the Zero TT bike to number one podium position, but Daley was killed in the Superbike crash. Zef Eisenberg promised Daley's wife Natalie, and family that this was unfinished business and he would take the NOU bike to world record glory himself as a tribute and final send-off to Daley.

The Madmax / NOU electric motorbike was re-engineered to be more powerful than ever and on 21/22 September, Eisenberg, along with the help of Dr Miguel achieved four FIM world speed records (at Elvington, Yorkshire), wearing Daley's actual 'daisy' kneesliders and with Daley's wife Natalie present, Eisenberg fulfilled his goal of making the bike into a world record bike for Daley. This technological feat achieved in record time, inspired the Royal Automobile Club (RAC) club to name Eisenberg as the winner of the SIMMS award, a highly prestigious accolade, only given in years of exceptional motorsport performance.

=== Eisenberg V8 Motorbike ===
The autosports arm builds bespoke high-speed bikes and cars. The brand manufactures the Eisenberg V8 (EV8), the world's smallest and lightest V8 engine. under the Eisenberg Racing banner. Eisenberg has created a partnership with Prodrive, one of the UK's largest motorsport engineering brands to develop a limited production run of the 480 hp motorbike. The bike is considered to be one of, if not the most, powerful production bike ever made, with a speed in excess of 225 mph, a redline of 10,500rpm, more than twice the torque of a Triumph Rocket 3, up to 500 hp (with race fuel), but weighing just 280 kg dry and a wheelbase of 1650mm, no longer than a Ducati Diavel. The bike is expected to cost around £150,000 when launched sometime in 2021.

== TV and media ==
=== Speed Freaks ===
His success in land speed racing led Eisenberg to become a TV presenter/racer with a new 'high octane' TV series called Speed Freaks, a six-episode production on ITV4, produced by Keshet. The series saw Eisenberg take on his toughest challenge yet - to break the British land speed record in a Porsche built by ESMOTOR UK. Speed Freaks was commissioned for ITV4 by Paul Mortimer, Head of Digital Channels and Satmohan Panesar, Commissioning Editor, Factual Entertainment.

David Williams, Keshet Productions said, "This high-octane series features a feast of items and VTs geared up to indulge anyone with an interest in cars, motorsports and engineering. Zef's need for speed and desire to break that land-speed record is infectious and makes for compelling viewing." In May 2019, Eisenberg achieved his goal of the fastest ever wheel-driven vehicle (bike or car) at Pendine sands, with speeds exceeding 210 mph.

=== The Bike Show ===
Eisenberg also appeared on several other TV shows, most notably The Bike Show with Henry Cole, with the Madmax Turbine bike. Eisenberg, his Madmax Turbine bike, and his infamous 230-mile-per-hour (370 km/h) crash featured in Guy Martin's Channel 4 documentary about the world's fastest tractor with JCB.

== Ultra-speed motorbike and car racing ==
Eisenberg was an ultra-high-speed motorbike racer. He held the Guinness World Record (2-way average in a mile) for the fastest turbine-powered motorbike at 225.4 miles per hour (362.7 km/h) and naked motorbike (no fairing) in Britain, also at 225.4 miles per hour (362.7 km/h). He held the world land-speed record for the same motorbike, with a 1-way peak top speed of 234.01 miles per hour (376.60 km/h), achieved in May 2018. The motorbike was powered by a 580 hp Rolls-Royce C20W engine which comes from the Agusta 109 helicopter.

Eisenberg also held the world record for the fastest turbine-powered streetfighter at 231 miles per hour (372 km/h), and UK record for the fastest no-fairing naked bike. He held the record for the fastest production motorcycle (no modifications or tuning) at Pendine Sands at 186 miles per hour (299 km/h).

In May 2018, Eisenberg broke the world land speed record for a motorbike on sand, reaching 201.5 miles per hour (324.3 km/h). This was also the first time that anyone had broken the 200 mph barrier on either a motorbike or car at Pendine Sands.

In April 2019, Eisenberg set a new fastest 'wheel powered' flying mile record on a motorbike at Pendine Sands, reaching 182.40 miles per hour (293.54 km/h). beating the previous record of 174 miles per hour (280 km/h) set by Sir Malcolm Campbell in 1927 and actor Idris Elba's 2015 effort.

On 17 May 2019, Zef Eisenberg returned to Pendine with his ESMOTOR UK built bespoke 1200 hp Porsche 911 Turbo. On his very first pair of runs, he achieved the following records:

- Fastest sand speed record ever achieved by a wheel-powered vehicle at 210.332 miles per hour (338.497 km/h) at Pendine Sands.
- Fastest flying quarter (one way) wheel powered record at 206.492 miles per hour (332.317 km/h), Pendine record (and MSA under 5000cc record).
- Fastest flying mile (one-way) wheel powered record at 196.970 miles per hour (316.992 km/h), Pendine record (and MSA under 5000cc record).
- Fastest Flying mile (2-way) 187.962 miles per hour (302.496 km/h) (same measurement as Sir Malcolm Campbell), Pendine record.
- As of 2019, Zef Eisenberg was the only person in history to have achieved over 200 mph on bike and car at Pendine, and a flying mile record in bike and car in Britain, and the only person to hold car and bike records, other than John Surtees, CBE, who competed in the English Grand Prix motorcycle and Formula One.

In September 2019, Eisenberg achieved four FIM world records for the fastest ever electric (unfaired) motorbike with the Madmax / Notts uni Zero TT bike, achieving, 2-way average 1-kilometre speeds of 185 miles per hour (298 km/h), one-mile speeds of 194.04 miles per hour (312.28 km/h) and peak GPS speeds of 197 miles per hour (317 km/h) in just over a mile in Elvington, Runway 26 at Yorkshire.

In November 2019, Eisenberg was awarded the Royal Automobile Club Simms award, a highly prestigious accolade, only given in years of exceptional motorsport performance.

In January 2020, Eisenberg was shortlisted for the Richard Burton Salver Outstanding individual sporting achievement of the year by a sportsman resident in Guernsey 2020 for his motor racing achievements in 2019.

=== 2016 crash ===
On 18 September 2016, Eisenberg crashed on a turbine-powered motorbike at 234 miles per hour (377 km/h) at Elvington Airfield, Yorkshire. He was airlifted to Leeds General Infirmary.

Eisenberg broke 11 bones in the crash, including his pelvis, hip and femur. As of July 2017, Eisenberg said he had "90% recovered". Eisenberg said a strict exercise and nutrition programme was responsible for his recovery.

As of September 2017, Eisenberg appeared to have fully recovered. On the anniversary of the crash, he returned to Elvington Airway, Yorkshire, to race on the same bike. He was nominated in his home island of Guernsey for the 'overcoming adversity' awards twice in 2017 and 2018.

=== 2020 crash and death ===
Eisenberg died on 1 October 2020 while attempting a British land speed record at RAF Elvington, Yorkshire, aged 47.

== Personal life ==
Eisenberg lived in Saint Peter Port, Guernsey, where he became full-time resident in 2005 with his partner Marni Alexander and their two children, having been a regular visitor since 7 years of age with his father. He project-managed and raised funds to build both the largest concrete skatepark in Guernsey and the largest adventure playground at Saumarez park, Castel.

In 2019, Eisenberg was awarded 'Parish champion of the year' in the 'Pride of Guernsey' 2019 awards for their five year project to deliver the Saumarez Park playground Project.

In 2017 and 2018, Eisenberg was nominated for the short list for Pride of Guernsey 'Overcoming Adversity' award.

In 2015, Eisenberg came second in the ITV Ambassador of the year for Guernsey.

In 2002, Eisenberg was awarded the Ernst & Young Entrepreneur of the Year Award.
