= The Alan Davies Show =

- Genre: Comedy drama
- Running time: 30 minutes
- Country of origin: United Kingdom
- Language: English
- Home station: BBC Radio 4
- Starring: Alan Davies; Ronni Ancona; Alan Francis
- Written by: Alan Davies; Tony Roche; Ben Silburn
- Produced by: Jane Berthoud
- Original release: 20 May – 24 June 1998
- No. of series: 1
- No. of episodes: 6
- Audio format: Stereophonic sound
- Website: BBC website

The Alan Davies Show is a short-lived radio program that aired from May – June 1998. The show revolved around Alan Davies playing himself as a struggling actor, and the relationship with his best friends Kate (Ronni Ancona) and Murray (Alan Francis). The series also featured British actors Kevin Eldon, Dave Lamb, Caroline Loncq, Alistair McGowan, Debra Stephenson, and Kim Wall.

Only one series of 6 half-hour episodes was made, which aired on Wednesday evenings on BBC Radio 4. A year later the series was repeated at 11.00p.m. on Tuesdays, with a six-month gap between episode 1 and 2. The series was recorded at Broadcasting House.

The theme tune was Crazy by Barenaked Ladies. This was replaced for the cassette release.

Four episodes, Poo, Mr. Strawberry, All You Can Eat and Tree, were released on audiocassette by BBC Audiobooks Ltd in May 1999. The series is no longer on sale.

== Episode list ==
Episode	Title	First broadcast
1	Poo	20 May 1998
2	(Mungo)	27 May 1998
3	Mr Strawberry	3 June 1998
4	All You Can Eat	10 June 1998
5	Tree	17 June 1998
6	Shipping and Trucking	24 June 1998
