= The Staggering Stories of Ferdinand de Bargos =

British TV comedy series

The Staggering Stories of Ferdinand de Bargos is a 1989 BBC comedy television series, in which surreal and satirical narratives are assembled entirely out of archive film clips, with new soundtracks provided by voice-over artists. It was written and produced by Geoff Atkinson and Kim Fuller, and ran for three series until 1995.

== Cast ==
Most of the voice-overs were provided by voice artists who were already well known in the industry, having previously worked on comedy series such as Spitting Image. Among them were Jim Broadbent, Ronni Ancona, Kate Robbins, Enn Reitel, Jon Glover, Alistair McGowan and Caroline Leddy. Many of them went on to perform in front of the camera, taking starring roles in impressionist comedy series such as The Big Impression.
