= Alan Francis (writer) =

British comedian

Alan Francis is a comedian and writer from Scotland. He is the co-author of play Jeffrey Dahmer is Unwell, which according to an otherwise unfavorable review in The Guardian was a "cult success" at the 1995 Edinburgh Festival premier, where Francis also co-starred. He also authored and starred in "Clobbered", which according to a positive 2004 review in The Independent is being adapted for both radio and television.

In 1991, he won the Edinburgh Festival Fringe newcomer contest "So You Think You're Funny". He was a writer on BBC1's comedy sketch show The Big Impression.
