= The Calcium Kid =

- Promotional poster for the film
- Directed by: Alex De Rakoff
- Written by: Derek Boyle; Alex De Rakoff; Raymond Friel
- Produced by: Natascha Wharton
- Starring: Orlando Bloom; Michael Peña; Michael Lerner; Billie Piper; Mark Heap
- Cinematography: David M. Dunlap
- Edited by: Mags Arnold; Jon Harris
- Music by: The Boilerhouse Boys (Ben Wolff/Andy Dean)
- Production companies: StudioCanal; Working Title Films; WT^{2} Productions
- Distributed by: Universal Pictures
- Release date: 30 April 2004
- Running time: 89 minutes
- Country: United Kingdom
- Language: English
- Box office: $109,202

The Calcium Kid is a British mockumentary comedy film which was released in 2004. It stars Orlando Bloom as a milkman and amateur boxer. Billie Piper and Michael Peña are also featured. It is directed by Alex De Rakoff and produced by Working Title Films.

== Plot ==
Jimmy Connelly is a milkman who is thrust into the spotlight after a brutal fighter, Pete Wright, gets injured. Under manager Herbie Bush, Jimmy must fight the middleweight champion of the world, Jose Mendez.

Within the lead up to the fight with Mendez, Jimmy has to take part in a press conference, in which Bush recommends him to give Mendez fighting talk. However, this leads to Jimmy being seen as a fascist and a disgrace to England after being seen as racist.

After Jimmy realises the harm Bush has caused, he calls off the fight. As Bush and the training team look for Jimmy, they find him cleaning his old milk cart. In a negotiation to help the town in order to fight, Jimmy is persuaded to participate.

In the locker room, minutes before the fight, as Jimmy and his crew walk backstage, Wright holds a shotgun to them, whilst the camera crew is also held hostage, filming the event. Wright leads them to a room where Jimmy is forced to fight Mendez, who is also held hostage. After getting substantially battered by Mendez, Jimmy manages to fight back, but then Wright smacks his head with the gun. As Wright goes to shoot Mendez, who is praying for his life, Jimmy knocks out Wright with a single punch.

With the film crew recording the event, Jimmy becomes a hero across Britain.

== Cast ==
- Orlando Bloom as Jimmy Connelly
- Michael Peña as José Mendez
- Billie Piper as Angel
- Rafe Spall as Stan Parlour
- Tamer Hassan as Pete Wright
- Omid Djalili as Herbie Bush
- David Kelly as Paddy O'Flanagan
- Mark Heap as Sebastian Gore-Brown
- Michael Lerner as Artie Cohen
- John Joyce as Jon Wright
- Cathy Dunning as Joyce Wright
- Frank Harper as Clive Connelly
- Ronni Ancona as Pat Connelly
- Peter Serafinowicz as Radio DJ

== Reception ==
The film received negative reviews from critics. On Rotten Tomatoes it has a rare overall rating of 0% based on reviews from 5 critics, with an average rating of 3.9/10.

Peter Bradshaw of the Guardian gave it 1 out of 5, mentions that the due to success of The Lord of the Rings, Orlando Bloom "puts a lot of youthful buttocks on seats, and that demographic calculation can be the only reason for releasing this shamingly bad British comedy."

Variety said Bloom was "likable enough, but it's not a strong enough performance to anchor a one-joke movie" and praised the supporting actors, but was critical of the obviously scripted mockumentary for "the sheer unbelievability of the basic premise" and the "lack of sufficient invention in the script" saying it pales in comparison to soccer mockumentary, "Mike Bassett".

Empire gave it 2 out of 5, and said "none of the integral elements of the film – script, acting or direction – gel quite as well as they might, and what's left is an over-stylised advert for milk."

== See also ==
- List of boxing films
