= Working Title Films =

British film and television production company

Working Title Films Limited
- Logo used since 2008
- Formerly: Visionensure Limited (October 1992 – December 1992); Working Title Limited (December 1992 – February 1995)
- Type: Subsidiary
- Industry: Film production
- Founded: 1983; 43 years ago
- Founders: Tim Bevan; Sarah Radclyffe
- Headquarters: London, United Kingdom
- Number of locations: London; Los Angeles
- Key people: Tim Bevan; Eric Fellner; Liza Chasin; Debra Hayward; Natascha Wharton
- Parent: PolyGram Filmed Entertainment (1992–1998); Universal Pictures (1998–present)
- Divisions: WT^{2} Productions; Working Title Television
- Website: workingtitlefilms.com

Working Title Films Limited, formerly Visionensure Limited and Working Title Limited, is a British film and television production company that is a subsidiary of NBCUniversal, which is itself a division of Comcast. The company was founded by Tim Bevan and Sarah Radclyffe in 1983. Bevan and Eric Fellner are now the co-chairmen of the company.

== Company history ==
=== 1983–1991: foundation, early success and acquisition by Polygram ===
Bevan and Radclyffe were partners in pop music promotional company, Aldabra, and set up Working Title Films in London in 1983 where they were commissioned by newly created UK broadcaster, Channel 4, to make a television film, My Beautiful Laundrette (1985), directed by Stephen Frears. My Beautiful Laundrette was a success at the Edinburgh Film Festival and received a theatrical release, where it was successful internationally. Accountant Graham Bradstreet joined as a third partner in 1986.

A World Apart was entered in competition at the 1988 Cannes Film Festival and won the Special Grand Prize of the Jury. The Tall Guy (1988) saw the feature film debut of screenwriter Richard Curtis and director Mel Smith.

In 1988, Michael Kuhn of PolyGram started to work with the company and in 1989 PolyGram acquired 49% of the company and they jointly launched Manifesto Film Sales. Manifesto's first third-party pick up for distribution was the Coen brothers' Barton Fink (1991). Bradstreet left the company in 1990 and Radclyffe a year later, with Eric Fellner, a fellow independent film producer, joining the company in 1991. The same year, Kuhn set up PolyGram Filmed Entertainment which acquired 100% of Working Title in 1992.

=== 1991–1997: incorporation, expansion and critical and commercial breakthrough ===
Paul Webster set up an office in Los Angeles in 1991 and producer Liza Chasin was appointed as president of production. Webster produced the company's first American films, Rubin & Ed and Drop Dead Fred. Working Title also made Tim Robbins' directorial debut, Bob Roberts (1992).

In 1991, Working Title was involved in a bid for the London Weekend ITV licence. Working Title, Mentorn, Palace and PolyGram wanted to take over from London Weekend Television and broadcast to London under the name London Independent Broadcasting. In the event, LWT retained its licence; London Independent Broadcasting's proposals were deemed by the Independent Television Commission, which was overseeing the bid process, to fail the quality threshold.

The company was incorporated and registered as a private limited company in the UK on 14 October 1992, as Visionensure Limited. On 18 December 1992 its name was changed to Working Title Limited, before rebranding as Working Title Films Limited on 20 February 1995.

=== 1998–present ===
Gramercy Pictures began distributing the company's films in the United States, starting with Posse (1993). In 1994, the company's Four Weddings and a Funeral, written by Curtis, became the highest-grossing British film of all time with a gross of $245 million. They also made the Coen brothers' The Hudsucker Proxy (1994). In 1996, Robbins' Dead Man Walking was the company's first film to win an Academy Award, with Susan Sarandon winning the Academy Award for Best Actress. The Coen brothers' Fargo (1996) won two Academy Awards the following year. The company had another major success with Bean (1997) directed by Smith and co-written by Curtis, grossing $251 million.

In 1998, PolyGram was sold to the Seagram company and merged with MCA Music Entertainment, to form Universal Music Group. PolyGram Films was folded into Universal Pictures. In 1999, Seagram sold the bulk of its library of PolyGram films released up until 31 March 1996 to Metro-Goldwyn-Mayer (MGM). 1999 also saw the company's highest-grossing film to date with Notting Hill, again written by Curtis, with a gross of $364 million.

In 1999, Bevan and Fellner launched a subsidiary company named Working Title 2 Productions, commonly known as WT^{2}. The company is an independent film production arm run by Natascha Wharton, and has produced films that include Billy Elliot, Shaun of the Dead and The Calcium Kid.

Around 2003, New Zealand-born producer Tim White was appointed head of the Australian branch of Working Title Films, and during this time executive produced Gregor Jordan's Ned Kelly.

Although contractually allowed to produce any film with a budget of up to $35 million, on a practical basis, Bevan and Fellner consult with studio executives at Working Title's parent company NBCUniversal. Working Title renewed its first look deal with Universal Pictures in 2020.

== Television division ==
Working Title has been active in television production since the beginning of the 1990s. In February 2010, Working Title officially launched its television division as a joint venture with parent company NBCUniversal, itself owned by Comcast. Since then, they have produced content for both British and American television. Notable productions and co productions developed by Working Title Television (WTTV) include NBC's About a Boy, and Showtime's The Tudors.

WTTV has offices in London and Los Angeles.
