= Linda Carter =

Fictional character from EastEnders

- EastEnders character
- Portrayed by: Kellie Bright
- Duration: 2013–present
- First appearance: Episode 4765; 19 December 2013
- Created by: Dominic Treadwell-Collins
- Introduced by: Dominic Treadwell-Collins
- Spin-off appearances: The Queen Vic Quiz Night (2020); TV Soundtracks EastEnders: The Six (2023); Tracey: A Day in the Life (2024)
In-universe information
- Other names: Linda Peacock
- Occupation: Pub landlady; Barmaid; Laundrette assistant; Waitress; Businesswoman; Salon owner; B&B worker
- Father: John Peacock
- Mother: Elaine Peacock
- Stepfather: George Knight
- Husband: Mick Carter (2016–2022)
- Sons: Lee Carter; Johnny Carter; Ollie Carter
- Daughters: Nancy Carter; Annie Carter
- Stepdaughters: Frankie Lewis
- Grandsons: Michael Carter
- Grandmothers: Rose

Linda Carter is a fictional character from the BBC soap opera EastEnders, played by Kellie Bright. She first appeared on 19 December 2013 and her casting was announced alongside her on-screen partner, Mick Carter (Danny Dyer). Linda was introduced as the new landlady of The Queen Victoria public house by new executive producer Dominic Treadwell-Collins as part of the Carter family. The introduction of Dyer and Bright was part of a large cast shake-up planned by new executive producer Treadwell-Collins in an attempt to improve ratings. Known for her bright, usually pink outfits and high "bun" hairstyles, she has been compared to original landlady Angie Watts (Anita Dobson), and Bright has said that she had based her portrayal of Linda on Angie. In August 2026, it was announced that Bright had decided to leave the soap after 13 years.

In May 2016, Bright announced that she was pregnant with her second child and would be taking maternity leave. Linda departed the series on 25 December 2016, but made two separate guest appearances in March and June 2017. She returned full-time on 7 August 2017. In March 2021, Bright announced her third pregnancy and departed six months later on 21 September 2021. Linda returned for two episodes, broadcast on 28 and 31 December 2021. She returned full-time on 4 April 2022. The character appeared in her 1000th episode on 12 October 2022. Bright took a break from the show on-screen on 22 July 2025 and returned on 15 December.

Linda's storylines include struggling with the revelation that her son Johnny (Sam Strike/Ted Reilly/Charlie Suff) is gay; being raped by Mick's brother Dean Wicks (Matt Di Angelo); giving birth to a premature baby after falling down the stairs; suffering from bulimia nervosa; marrying Mick after a previous storyline where it was revealed that the couple were not actually married; discovering that Mick kissed their daughter-in-law Whitney Dean (Shona McGarty); revealing that she has secretly battled cervical cancer; surviving an ambulance crash; perverting the course of justice when Stuart Highway (Ricky Champ) is shot, leading to her being falsely accused of attempted murder; coping with son Ollie's (Harry Farr) diagnosis of autism; battling with alcoholism; splitting up with Mick for a short time, and an extramarital affair with Max Branning (Jake Wood), which leads to another pregnancy; ultimately divorcing Mick after being lured back into alcoholism by Janine Butcher (Charlie Brooks), who wants him for herself; adjusting to life without Mick after he is presumed dead at sea after shortly reuniting with him; dealing with the return of her rapist Dean, murdering Keanu Taylor (Danny Walters) to save her best friend Sharon Watts (Letitia Dean) during "The Six" storyline, for which she later turned herself in to the police but effectively escaped punishment after Nish Panesar (Navin Chowdhry) took the blame, coming to terms with the revelation that her father was gay which her mother hid for years and eventually admitting herself to rehab for her alcoholism before returning, selling The Queen Vic to Kat Slater (Jessie Wallace), marking the end of her tenure as landlady after more than a decade, being reacquainted with Bea Pollard (Ronni Ancona) who she bullied at school; a fling with Sharon's ex-husband Grant Mitchell (Ross Kemp); and resuming a relationship with Max.

== Development ==
=== Casting and introduction ===
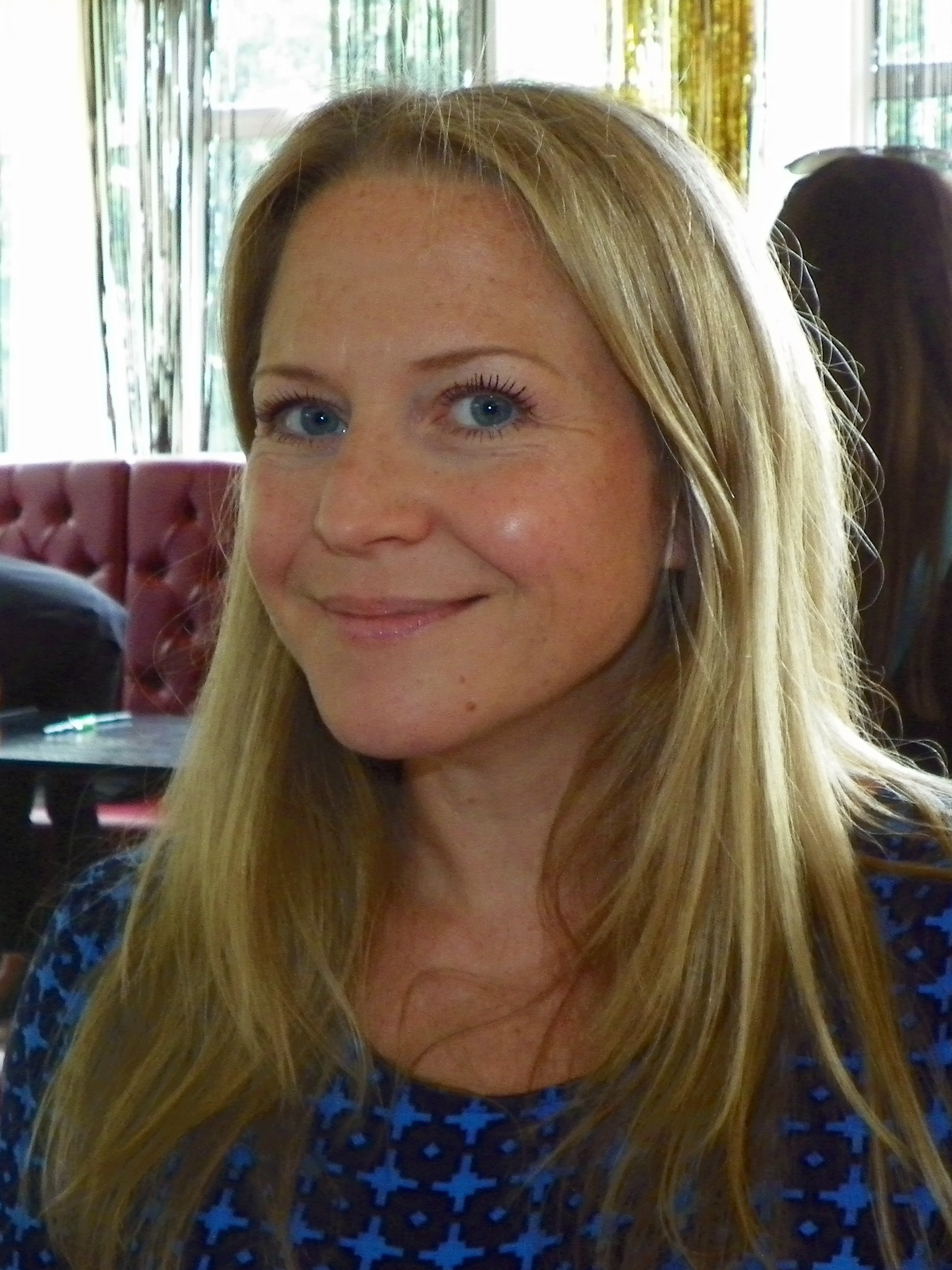
Kellie Bright was cast as Linda Carter in 2013.

Linda was introduced as the wife of Mick Carter, played by Danny Dyer, the brother of established character Shirley Carter (Linda Henry), who has appeared in EastEnders since 2006. Luisa Bradshaw-White joined the cast as Shirley's sister Tina Carter in early November, and Linda was the second new Carter to appear after her. Kellie Bright's casting was announced alongside Danny Dyer's on 1 October 2013, a week after Bradshaw-White's casting was revealed. Linda was described as having been with Mick since they were teenagers, and despite not being 'blessed with brains', is a 'tough woman who will always fight tooth and nail for her family – especially her children'. Bright previously appeared as a bridesmaid in 1986 at the wedding of Michelle Fowler (Susan Tully) and Lofty Holloway (Tom Watt), and starred in scenes opposite her current co-star Letitia Dean, who continues to appear as Sharon Watts. Bright estimated herself to be aged 10 at the time. She also auditioned for the role of Tanya Branning in 2006, a role that was eventually given to Jo Joyner.

Linda first appeared in an episode that aired on BBC One on 19 December 2013, visited partner Mick's sisters Shirley and Tina when they needed money. Linda rejected them. She made her full arrival on 26 December 2013, the Boxing Day episode for EastEnders, moving into her new home on Albert Square, The Queen Victoria. Mick and Linda became the landlord and landlady of their pub. In a poll held by Digital Spy a month after the introduction of the Carters, Linda was the least popular, with 5.65% of the vote. Mick proved to be the most popular, with nearly 50% of the vote.

=== Relationship with Mick Carter ===
Upon the character's announcement, Treadwell-Collins explained that in their fictional backstory, Mick and Linda have been married for over twenty years, and have been together since they were teenagers. Hello called them "childhood sweethearts". They were called "a tight family unit", and Treadwell-Collins said they have a "good marriage" and "an easy shorthand with each other—but can also still fight like teenagers." He said that the characters would laugh, cry, argue and make up, which would embarrass their children, but would delight their neighbours. It was said that the couple "still love each other, no matter what life throws at them", and that after moving to the fictional setting of Walford from Watford, "life's about to throw them a few curve balls." Inside Soap said that Mick and Linda have a passionate relationship and adore each other. Bright explained that Mick and Linda have grown up together, and said: "It's a weird thing when you've known someone your whole life—you're more than just husband and wife. You're something else." She later said that Mick and Linda have known each other since they were five or six years old, and can finish each other's sentences and know how the other is feeling by the look on their face. Dyer and Bright both said that Mick and Linda are passionate and lustful, with Bright saying they are "madly in love" and describing a "real fizz between them". She said, "they're kind of tearing each other's heads off or tearing each other's clothes off." Dyer said there is a "Den and Angie [Watts] feel" to the relationship. Jane Simon from the Daily Mirror said that the fact Mick and Linda are happily married is a "rare thing in soapland". However, in July 2014, it was revealed in storylines that Mick and Linda are not married, yet all their families believes they are, a fact that left Carena Crawford from All About Soap wondering why they never got married and why they kept this a secret, but she hoped for a big wedding.

=== Early storylines ===
Linda's early stories included her struggle with son Johnny's (Sam Strike) sexuality, which was revealed a week after the Carters moved into The Queen Vic. While Mick portrayed the accepting father (a portrayal that was widely praised by critics), Linda protested against her son being gay, and encouraged him to enter a relationship with his friend, Whitney Dean (Shona McGarty), who was obviously keen. This caused many arguments between mother and son. The argument eventually reached breaking point in June 2014, when Linda failed to support Johnny's plans to go to gay pride and caused him embarrassment by revealing his cowardice during the attack on Sharon Rickman (Letitia Dean). As a result, Johnny left home, but Linda tracked him down with the help of her father-in-law Stan (Timothy West), and they reunited, with Linda showing her acceptance by dropping him off at gay pride in London.

Other storylines included Linda's turmoilous friendship with Sharon, which turned into a rivalry when she opened a rival bar, The Albert, in Walford; her plans to breed her dog, Lady Di, being scuppered when her daughter Nancy (Maddy Hill) lost control of her and she was impregnated by Abi Branning's (Lorna Fitzgerald) dog Tramp; and her turmoil over her eldest son, Lee (Danny Hatchard) being in the army, and her supporting him through the grief for a lost comrade on his return to England. She was involved in a brief scandal where Dexter Hartman (Khali Best), Alfie Moon (Shane Richie) and Jay Brown (Jamie Borthwick) discovered pictures of her during her time as a Page 3 model.

=== Dean Wicks and rape ===
In April 2014, Matt Di Angelo was reintroduced as Shirley's estranged son Dean Wicks. Linda formed a connection with Dean as she counselled him through his long standing issues with his mother, having a fair perspective on the situation due to her own battles with Shirley in the past. Through this, Dean developed feelings for her. Linda remained unaware of the crush for several weeks until Dean fondled her buttocks during a photoshoot for the salon. Linda warned him to back off. Speaking of Dean's feelings for Linda, Di Angelo claimed that it stemmed from the desire that "Dean (secretly) wants to be Mick", but warned that it wouldn't "be filled with too much happiness for too long". Dean also stumbled upon the family secret that Mick and Linda were not married, and later drunkenly kissed Linda when she was struggling with issues surrounding Mick falsely pleading guilty to soliciting prostitutes.

On 31 August 2014, it was announced that Dean would rape Linda. EastEnders bosses worked with charity Rape Crisis to develop the storyline. Bright said about the storyline that she "hoped that Linda's journey would change viewers' perception of rape", Di Angelo claimed that although the storyline will be "challenging", it was massively "important". The storyline aired over the autumn. Maria Friedman was introduced as Linda's mother, Elaine Peacock. Following the attack, Linda fell pregnant. When Dean returns to the pub after a short absence, Bright stated that Linda is horrified despite trying to move on. Bright also added that Linda does not want to know who the baby's father is as she thinks that Linda is "scared and terrified".

=== Temporary departures ===
In May 2016, Bright announced that she was pregnant with her second child, and on 28 September 2016 it was confirmed that Bright would take six months maternity leave. Linda's on screen departure aired on 25 December 2016. Bright interrupted her maternity leave for two episodes in March 2017, a voiceover on 14 March 2017 and on 23 May 2017 and a physical appearance on 16 March 2017.

Bright returned to filming full-time on 22 April 2017, and after making a guest appearance on 30 June 2017, her full-time return aired on 7 August.

Bright announced her third pregnancy on 22 March 2021 and departed on 21 September 2021 for maternity leave. She made one-off appearances on 28 and 31 December 2021.

=== Alcoholism ===
In September 2019, it was confirmed that an upcoming storyline would see Linda battle with alcoholism. EastEnders revealed that it was working with Drinkaware for the story. The storyline began in November 2019 playing a central part of the year's Christmas and New Year episodes. It was announced in December that Linda would be featuring in a special episode centering around her alcoholism on New Year's Eve, with the prognosis saying, "The entire special episode will be shown from Linda's perspective as her drinking problem spirals out of control". EastEnders senior executive producer Kate Oates explained that Linda's downward spiral was a combination of a lot of traumatic experiences in her life. The storyline has been revisited several times from 2021 again playing a central part of the 2024 Christmas storylines.

=== The Six murder ===
In February 2023, there was a flashforward scene which saw Linda, alongside Sharon, Kathy, Suki, Stacey and Denise in the Vic looking over a dead body revealing a Christmas Day murder would occur. In September 2023, executive producer Chris Clenshaw revealed to Bright that Linda would be the killer. On Christmas Day 2023, it was revealed that Linda murdered Keanu, in defense of Sharon, whom Keanu was attempting to strangle. It was revealed earlier in the year that a big storyline would centre around Linda, would commence in February 2023, the same month the flashforward took place.

=== Departure ===
In August 2026, it was announced that Bright had decided to leave the soap after 13 years. In a statement she said: "EastEnders has been my home for thirteen years and I have absolutely loved being part of the show, but I have decided that it is now the right time for me to say goodbye. I made the tough decision over a year ago, and after discussing this with Kate Oates and Ben Wadey, they asked me to stay on to be part of an exciting storyline they had planned, and I happily agreed to extend my stay. I will miss my friends and colleagues hugely, but I am looking forward to my next chapter and spending more time with my wonderful boys."

Speaking of her exit, executive producer Ben Wadey added: "Kellie has been at the beating heart of EastEnders for the past 13 years, and her characterisation of the fiercely lovable, protective, and brilliant Linda Carter has made her a favourite amongst the viewers and cemented her as a classic EastEnders icon. Kellie has been involved in some of the show’s most explosive and iconic storylines, and everyone at EastEnders will miss Kellie and Linda dearly. When Kellie told us of her decision last year to leave, we already had big plans for Linda, so we were delighted that Kellie agreed to stay on to see them through. We’ve still got a long way to go before we say goodbye, but I can promise that Kellie’s exit storyline will be full of unmissable drama. I’d like to thank Kellie for her time here at EastEnders, and we wish her all the best for the future."

== Storylines ==
Linda first appears when her partner Mick Carter's (Danny Dyer) sisters, Shirley (Linda Henry) and Tina Carter (Luisa Bradshaw-White), visit her mother Elaine Peacock's (Maria Friedman) pub in Watford, where Linda and her family are living. They intend to ask Mick for a loan but Linda rejects them as Mick is not around. As revenge, Tina steals the money from a bingo jar but Shirley returns it, proving her honesty to Mick, and also recommends The Queen Victoria public house as a potential pub of their own in Walford, where Shirley lives. Mick purchases the pub from Phil Mitchell (Steve McFadden), who is at first unaware of his identity, and Mick, Linda, their son Johnny Carter (Sam Strike) and their bulldog, Lady Di (Hot Lips), move in and start trading. Linda continues to clash with Shirley, who moves in with them, and she befriends Sharon Rickman (Letitia Dean) over their mutual dislike of Shirley. Linda and Mick receive an invite to their daughter Nancy Carter's (Maddy Hill) wedding to Wayne Ladlow (Malachi Kirby), a troublemaker, but they disapprove so Mick forcibly removes her from the wedding service. In the following argument, Nancy reveals that Johnny is gay, and has been hiding his sexuality in fear of how his parents will react. While Mick is supportive, Linda refuses to accept that he is gay and encourages him to date Whitney Dean (Shona McGarty), who shows an interest in him. Mick, along with Shirley and Tina, visit their estranged father Stan Carter (Timothy West) for money, and reunite with him in the process. He moves into the pub when he breaks his ankle and becomes immobile, and, despite initially clashing with him, Linda warms to having him around.

Linda's friendship with Sharon comes under strain when Sharon reveals plans to open a new bar in Walford, named "The Albert". Realising it will be in direct competition to The Queen Vic, she plots to get inside knowledge about the bar, convincing Johnny to take a job there. However, Johnny likes the job and tells her that he does not want to feed information to her. Linda and Mick's eldest son, Lee Carter (Danny Hatchard), returns from Afghanistan, where he has been serving in the army. He is grieving for a comrade he has lost, and Linda is a comfort and support to him. Shirley's estranged son Dean Wicks (Matt Di Angelo) comes to Walford, and although he continues to share a troubled relationship with his mother, he is welcomed by Mick and Linda into the family. Dean develops feelings for Linda, which she is at first unaware of, but discovers when he gropes her buttocks at a photoshoot for his new salon. She warns him that it is inappropriate but does not tell Mick out of fear of angering him.

Tina encourages Johnny to embrace his sexuality, inviting him to gay pride in London. Linda continues to be uncomfortable with this, and attempts to sabotage his plans by making him work. However, he realises what she is doing and in the ensuing argument he leaves home. Stan takes Linda to his old flat where Johnny is staying, and, after some tough love from Stan about her past, she apologises to Johnny and drops him off at gay pride, giving him her blessing. The following week, Linda has a party for her birthday, and Lee returns permanently from Afghanistan in time for the celebrations. After the party, Linda and Mick have a heart to heart, and he asks her to marry him properly, but she declines, determined to keep up the pretence to their children that they are already married. This conversation is overheard by Dean, who agrees to keep quiet.

Linda supports Mick when he participates in a swimming gala for Billy Mitchell (Perry Fenwick), despite being fearful of water. Mick conquers his fears, but on the way home he is arrested for soliciting a prostitute. He tells Linda that the police are making a mistake as it was in fact his friend Ian Beale (Adam Woodyatt), that was speaking with the prostitute; he pulled over merely to see what was going on. Stan's partner, Cora Cross (Ann Mitchell) overhears the conversation and accompanies Linda to Mick's hearing, and Linda is devastated when he pleads guilty to protect Ian, who is going through a tough time following the death of his daughter, Lucy Beale (Hetti Bywater) (see "Who Killed Lucy Beale?"). Linda agrees to keep quiet, but Cora has a change of heart about supporting Linda and reveals Mick's offence to the whole pub, running his name through the mud. Unable to cope with the negative social stigma surrounding her family, Linda demands that Mick reveals the truth, but he refuses, wanting to keep his word to Ian. However, the truth is revealed when the prostitute, who is revealed to be Cora's estranged daughter Rainie Cross (Tanya Franks), bumps into Ian's fiancée Denise Fox (Diane Parish) and reveals the truth. Denise visits Linda, struggling with the revelation, and Linda lies that she only just found out about Ian's actions. Ian however reveals the truth to Denise, who accuses Linda of attention seeking. One evening, Dean kisses Linda but she slaps him. Distraught over the upset that Mick's actions have brought her family, Linda leaves Walford to stay with Elaine in Watford. She returns, reconciling with Mick, before Sharon and Phil's wedding. When Sharon suggests that Dean's advances towards Linda were encouraged, both drunk, they have a bitter row in the pub. Sharon tells Nancy about the kiss, so Nancy accuses Dean and Linda of having an affair.

Shirley flees from Walford following the wedding, leaving Dean upset. Mick asks Linda to comfort him, but, misunderstanding her reassurance and very drunk, Dean rapes her. She becomes very withdrawn, telling nobody and refusing to be intimate with Mick. Trying to get to the bottom of what is going on, he calls Linda's mother, Elaine, asking her to visit The Queen Vic to help him understand her behaviour. Elaine makes some progress before leaving again. Mick theorises that Linda is pregnant when she vomits at the smell of lavender bath soap, and she, is horrified to discover he is correct, when she takes a test. She lies to Mick about the result and plans to have an abortion, but Mick finds out and she agrees to keep the baby. She is disturbed when Dean finds out, and tries to hang onto the belief that the baby is Mick's. Stacey Branning (Lacey Turner) bumps into Linda who asks her about her relationship with Dean, Linda nearly admits that Dean raped her however she is stopped from doing so when they are interrupted by Dean. However, Stacey grows suspicious, and when Linda unexpectedly gets scared when Dean is around, Stacey surmises that Dean raped her and confronts Linda. When Stacey depicts how she felt after her rape, Linda accepts that he did. Johnny announces he is leaving Walford to travel with Gianluca, although initially upset, Linda decides to support him.

Linda, feeling increasingly threatened by Dean, turns down Mick's Christmas Day proposal before stunning Mick by revealing the rape. Later that day he confronts Dean who lies, saying that he and Linda were having an affair. Mick attacks Dean forcing Shirley's revelation—Dean is his brother. Linda eavesdrops while Mick, Tina, Shirley, Babe and Stan argue, only to hear Mick deny that Dean is part of the family. Mick tells them that Dean raped Linda, but she overhears. Without saying anything, Linda leaves the pub. Mick leaves messages on her voicemail to ask her to come home and Elaine returns her to the pub. When she attempts to find solace in Sharon's home, Mick joins her, and she says they should not let what happened get in the way of their relationship. They are about to return to the pub when Mick has second thoughts and he decides to take Linda away for a break. When they return a few weeks later, they find Shirley helping to run the pub so Mick asks her to leave. When Mick accompanies her to the police station, Linda reports Dean for rape. She then fills Nancy and Lee in on recent events, having already told Elaine and Sharon. Dean is arrested by the police but released after questioning and accuses Linda of lying. Linda proposes to Mick who accepts. The next day, Nancy confesses to her that Mick choked Dean unconscious in the cellar and is being secretive about what happened. Elaine returns for Mick and Linda's engagement party, while Linda confronts Mick, who assures her that he did not kill Dean, although, later, Nancy tries to tell Shirley something about Dean, but collapses on the ground before she can do so. After Elaine returns for Linda's five-month scan the day after, Linda confesses to her her fears that the baby may not be Mick's. Linda organises a romantic picnic as a fresh start for her and Mick. Linda is devastated to learn that Dean will not be charged due to lack of evidence. Linda pleads with Dean to admit he raped her but just as she seems to be making leeway, Mick interrupts.

Linda falls down the stairs, causing her to go into premature labour. She gives birth to a healthy son, Ollie Carter (Jack Tilley). Linda confronts a delusional Dean when he insists on meeting the baby, believing that Ollie is his son. Mick discovers that he, Linda and Ollie share the same blood type, but Dean does not, meaning Dean cannot be the father. Linda and Mick agree they should marry soon. On her return home with Mick and Ollie, Linda snubs an apologetic Dean's attempt to shake her hand. When Linda and Nancy return from holiday, Linda learns that Lee has been suffering from depression, and she encourages him to take his medication. Elaine moves in temporarily, which initially causes consternation when she interferes with running the pub. Mick arranges for Linda to go to a wedding fair in Birmingham, and when she returns, she discovers that Mick and Shirley have been seeing each other in secret, which upsets Linda. After making herself sick one day, she tells Mick she cannot get married. Eventually, she tells him she hates herself and, because of Dean, she feels the same way she did when she suffered from bulimia nervosa after her father died, and has been making herself sick again. However, she agrees to marry Mick with his support. When Dean attempts to rape his fiancée Roxy Mitchell (Rita Simons), Linda encourages her to report this to the police. During a heated exchange with Linda where Shirley is present, Dean admits that he raped Linda. Stunned, Linda tells Mick, while Dean goes into hiding, where he sees one of Mick and Linda's wedding invites. On New Year's Day 2016, Dean goes to the wedding venue and attempts to drown Shirley, jumping into the lake with her. Mick fights with Dean in the lake and he is knocked unconscious. Mick rescues him and resuscitates him, and he is arrested for the attempted rape of Roxy. Afterwards, Linda and Mick marry. When they return from their honeymoon, Whitney kisses Mick, saying she has feelings for him, so he tells Linda what happened. Linda tells Whitney to keep away from Mick and not to give up on Lee.

Nancy and Lee have an argument, which causes Ollie (now Charlie Harrington) to fall off his highchair. Mick and Linda do not witness this, and when Mick insists they should get Ollie to hospital, Linda states he seems fine, but she later finds Ollie is not breathing. She successfully resuscitates him, only for him to suffer a seizure. Ollie is taken to hospital where a doctor tells the Carters that he could have brain damage after a head injury. Linda, in denial about the severity of Ollie's condition, argues with Mick, especially when he blames Nancy for the incident, however, she soon realises that Mick is right about Ollie having changed when he does not respond to her in the usual way. Linda is delighted by Johnny's (now played by Ted Reilly) return but saddened by Nancy's departure. Linda is devastated when Dean is acquitted but tells Mick she has become a strong person and that their relationship has become stronger. The Carters are later devastated when a pregnant Whitney suffers a miscarriage but are delighted when Lee and Whitney get married. The Carters are traumatised by a violent robbery on The Queen Vic, during which Linda's favourite necklace is stolen. Linda is inspired to make Christmas great as a result, and is overjoyed when Ollie takes his first steps. Linda is devastated to learn that Elaine has had a stroke in Spain on Christmas Eve, and she flies out there with Johnny to support her mother. Later, Johnny returns to Walford while Linda relocates with Elaine to Watford to aid her mother's recovery. Mick visits Linda and informs her that Babe has caused the pub to be fined £20,000 because of her selling alcohol illegally outside of licensing hours. When Mick struggles to cope with the pub's mounting debts, Jane Beale (Laurie Brett) calls Linda, worried about Mick. Linda returns the following day and Mick informs her of Lee's departure and the debts he left. Linda initially blames Whitney and an argument ensues, causing Whitney to leave. Mick explains to Linda that it was Lee's fault, causing another argument, although they make up and have sex. Following a heart-to-heart with Whitney, Linda decides to return to Elaine, which angers Mick as Linda saw the state he was in and left anyway. Linda then sends Woody Woodward (Lee Ryan) to work in The Queen Vic as a bar manager. With Lady Di needing an expensive operation and mounting debts, Shirley convinces Linda to sell the freehold of The Queen Vic, and they agree not to tell Mick. Linda signs the paperwork and Shirley forges Mick's signature. Linda returns to Walford for her birthday and meets Fi Browning (Lisa Faulkner), The Queen Vic's business consultant sent by the freeholder, Grafton Hill, and with the changes, she feels that The Queen Vic is not her home. She leaves again in the middle of the night, saying Elaine has fallen, but she is fine and Linda tells Elaine that she could not talk to Mick.

Two months later, Mick phones Linda, telling her to come back home or else there will be nothing to come back to. When Linda and Ollie (now played by Harry Farr) return, she is surprised when she discovers the amount of changes that have happened. When Linda discovers that Mick has been fighting in the pub, Shirley tells her that he has struggled with her prolonged absence and Linda admits that she has neglected him. When Linda is seemingly about to tell Mick about her secret, Mick admits to her that he is in love with someone else. Linda realises it is Whitney and throws her out, while Mick begs her not to give up on their marriage. Linda agrees to reconcile but is furious when Mick admits he paid Whitney off, so she slaps him. Following a conversation with Fi, Linda offers Whitney her job back but she also defies Fi by rehiring Tracey (Jane Slaughter). After confiding in Denise about Mick's infatuation, Denise tells Linda that she saw Mick and Whitney kiss several months previously. Linda then learns that Fi nearly kissed Mick. Linda considers leaving Walford with Ollie, however, she talks to Jack Branning (Scott Maslen) and reveals that Elaine's stroke was not severe and she recovered relatively quickly, but that Linda stayed away from Walford because she had been diagnosed with cervical cancer while caring for Elaine. Jack accompanies Linda to a check-up where she is told that there are no signs of cancer in her body but there is a chance it could come back, so she is unsure if she should tell Mick, but she does so. They go on holiday to rekindle their marriage and when they return, Linda is delighted that Whitney and Woody are emigrating, but Woody leaves without Whitney, so Linda is annoyed. Mick asks Linda to renew their wedding vows and she accepts, though has doubts after seeing Mick comforting Whitney. The Carters attempt to raise money after Grafton Hill tell them they need to pay £60,000 in repair costs or face eviction, though Fi tells them she has reduced it to £50,000. They raise the money but Fi's father, James Willmott-Brown (William Boyde), reveals he now owns the business and Fi denies reducing the debt. Willmott-Brown gives an eviction notice to the Carters, giving them a month to leave. After Willmott-Brown collapses from a heart attack, Fi gives the Carters a chance to buy back the freehold for The Queen Vic for £150,000. Linda rejects this offer, calling it unrealistic and telling her that her family will get their comeuppance. However, Mick is determined to find the money to keep the pub and signs up to participate in a robbery with Aidan Maguire (Patrick Bergin) and his gang on New Year's Day 2018. Linda is distraught when Mick is accidentally shot by Callum Highway (Tony Clay), an army friend of Lee's during the robbery. However, Mick recovers with the help of Linda, Shirley, Mariam Ahmed (Indira Joshi) and a remorseful Callum, who offers to help out at the pub. Several days later, Mick finds an expensive ring in Callum's possession and interrogates Callum, who admits he stole it from the robbery. Halfway gives the ring to the Carters, who then give the ring to Fi in exchange for the freehold for the pub. However, Aidan becomes suspicious of this and attempts to blackmail Mick into letting him use the pub for drug dealing. Aidan steps up his demands, repeatedly forcing him to accept money for these drug deals despite Linda returning it. The Carters decide to flee Walford to escape Aidan, who shows up and beats Mick up for not giving into his demands. However, Phil stops Aidan at the last minute and pressures him into leaving Walford or he'll reveal to the police that he killed Fi's brother Luke Browning (Adam Astill). Aidan calls off the drug deals, giving the Carters back control of The Queen Vic.

Callum's brother and Mick's old friend, Stuart Highway (Ricky Champ), arrives. Tina reveals that he abused her and another person Dylan Box (Ricci Harnett) when they were teenagers, and she attacks him. Stuart seeks revenge on the Carters and one night, Stuart is shot in The Queen Vic. Linda initially thinks Mick shot Stuart so she dumps the gun in the canal after she finds it in the bar but she is seen by Keanu Taylor (Danny Walters). Mick tells Linda he is innocent and she worries whether she did the right thing, though Mick reassures her. The next day, Linda is arrested for Stuart's attempted murder. However, when Stuart regains consciousness, he tells the police that Mick shot him, and Mick is arrested and remanded. Linda ends their relationship when he admits he started smothering Stuart and tells Stuart she believes that Mick shot him. Linda and Stuart begin meeting regularly and become close despite the family's protests. She tells the family she thinks Mick is guilty, throws away her wedding rings, and later throws the family out, then allows Stuart to move in, and calls a solicitor to begin divorce proceedings from Mick. When Shirley breaks into the pub to confront Linda over being manipulated by Stuart, Linda calls the police and they arrest Shirley. She is released the next day and attacks Stuart. Linda takes Shirley aside and secretly shows her that she has hidden her wedding rings in her bra: her close friendship with Stuart is actually part of a bigger plan to help get Mick out of prison as she still loves Mick and believes he is innocent. Linda then attempts to seduce Stuart to record a confession from him, but he finds the recording device. After he attempts to rape her, Linda gets him to confess that Mick did not shoot him, but he is unaware that she has a second recording device in her hair. Following this, Stuart is arrested for perverting the course of justice but is quickly released after he blames Dylan, this annoys and worries Linda that Mick might not be released, she hears a sound in the barrel stall and while investigating comes face to face with Mick.

Months later, Linda develops a stress-induced drinking disorder. She is arrested after crashing into a parent's car during the school run and, failing a breathalyser test, faces a court summons, also a driving ban which she keeps secret from Mick, unfortunately she reverts to drinking alcohol, anxious about telling him. On Christmas Eve, Linda gets drunk and insults Ruby Allen (Louisa Lytton) and Mick, mocking him about his panic attacks, which Ollie witnesses. Linda walks out and passes out in the gardens, being awoken by Lee, who has returned for Christmas. She spends the next day in hospital but discharges herself, in the need of a drink. Linda passes out in the back of a van and when she wakes up hungover, she finds herself at an abandoned warehouse where Martin Fowler (James Bye) has been ordered by Ben Mitchell (Max Bowden) to kill Keanu, in revenge for Keanu having an affair with and impregnating his stepmother, Sharon. As Ben wants evidence of Keanu's murder on a burner phone and, growing tired of Martin's uncertainty, Linda shoots Keanu in the shoulder herself. He survives and they follow Linda's plan of staging Keanu's murder, with Martin disposing of the evidence and both of them keeping quiet. Linda later invites Sharon to live with the Carters but her guilt grows, especially when Keanu's mother Karen Taylor (Lorraine Stanley) becomes convinced that Phil has killed him, causing her to drink heavily again. On New Year's Eve, she goes to Karen's party and gets excessively drunk, leading to her almost exposing the events of Christmas Day, kicking Sharon out, flirting with Max Branning (Jake Wood) and almost being raped by a stranger after going to his hotel room. After she phones him, Martin, turning up outside The Queen Vic, forcefully warns her in the nearby alleyway against revealing the events of Christmas Day or they are "both dead".

Mick later finds out about the hotel and confronts Linda, who claims she cannot remember anything but gets herself tested for STIs. Linda later gets drunk and confesses to Sharon that Keanu is still alive; she continues to taunt Martin over this, with him growing more worried that she will reveal everything. Linda's alcoholism continues to spiral out of control, resulting in her slapping Sharon and social services intervening as Ollie's schoolteachers notice him becoming extremely unhappy. After almost setting fire to the kitchen and potentially endangering Ollie with her behaviour, Shirley tries to drown Linda, who breaks down. Shirley then urges her to attend therapy for her alcoholism or face never seeing Ollie again. However, Linda continues her drinking and thinks that the family are all against her. Linda later kicks off and produces divorce papers telling Mick that their marriage is over, to his horror.

After Linda gives a drunken speech in front of everyone at The Queen Vic one night, humiliating Mick, he tells her he will see her in court. The day of the boat party, which is being held to celebrate The Queen Vic winning best pub, Linda and Shirley fight when Shirley notices Linda drinking as they prepare to leave. Shirley urges Linda to realize that she still loves Mick and that she should try to save her marriage. As they get ready to board the bus, Linda sees Mick and Whitney talking and assumes they are having an affair. Unbeknownst to her, Whitney has asked Mick for help following her accidental murder of Leo King (Tom Wells). Linda drinks Mo Harris' (Laila Morse) vodka on the bus en route to the boat and arrives drunk, which leads to her announcing in front of everyone that Mick and Whitney are having an affair. She later goes down to the boat's kitchen and sees a bottle of wine on a shelf, but as she climbs to reach for it the boat crash happens and she falls. Her ankle gets stuck and she gets knocked out, and later when water begins to pour in Mick arrives and hears her cries for help. Mick cannot get Linda's foot out and Linda tells him to leave her and to think of their kids, but Mick says he is staying with her. As the boat fills with more water, Mick decides to break Linda's ankle to free her and he and Linda later appear in the Thames with Mick holding on to an unconscious Linda. They are rescued by Stuart and Rainie who are on a life boat, and Linda regains consciousness. Once they reach the dock with all the other passengers, Linda is devastated as she sees Dennis being declared dead by paramedics who failed to resuscitate him. Mick, Linda and Tina later arrive home to The Queen Vic where Linda finally admits that she is an alcoholic and that she wants to get help, choosing her marriage and Mick over alcohol.

The day after the boat crash Mick tells Linda about Whitney calling him for help following her accidental murder of Leo as he is worried now that Whitney has confessed. Linda questions why he didn't call the police considering it was in self-defence. Mick later tells police he invited Whitney to the party as a distraction but does not reveal he knew about the murder. Linda makes a costume for Ollie for World Book Day and he wins 2nd place, delighting Linda. She also puts up a chart marking the days of being sober and gets rid of all her hidden bottles of alcohol throughout the house. While getting a coffee she runs into Sharon and offers to help her care for her newborn son. However, Linda is still tempted to drink and on the day of Denny's funeral, following an argument with Sharon, she does. Mick later decides that it is better for them to leave the pub and they sell it to Ian Beale and Sharon.

Linda begins working in the laundrette. On a night out, she becomes tired of Mick constantly watching what she drinks and takes a drink which is seen by Max. Following a heart to heart, Max kisses Linda. She initially pulls away but then kisses him back. Horrified at what she has done, Linda runs off. She kisses Max again and provides him with an alibi after Ian is attacked by an unknown assailant and left for dead. As Mick struggles from his depression, he tells Linda to stay away from him. Linda is hurt by this and then she decides to stay with Max and they have sex. Linda tells Mick that she slept with Max but Mick can't bring himself to do anything about it which makes Linda think he doesn't care. Max tries to convince Linda to move to New Zealand with him and, after another rejection from Mick, she decides to go. Mick almost attempts suicide before realising that Katy Lewis (Simone Lahbib) sexually abused him as a child. The next day, Mick heads over to Max's to tell Linda the truth but Max refuses to let him speak to her. Mick confronts Katy and finds out the truth about Frankie Lewis (Rose Ayling-Ellis) being his daughter. He then heads home to tell Linda everything but he can't find her and assumes she has left with Max. Linda tells Max she can't leave with him because she knows something is wrong with Mick. Linda then goes home and Mick tells her that Frankie is his daughter. Linda assumes Mick has cheated on her but he tells her that Frankie is nearly 31 years old, which means Mick would have been 12 when she was conceived. Linda is horrified as she realises that Mick was raped by Katy. She tells Mick she is sorry for sleeping with Max and almost taking Ollie away from him. Mick and Linda hug and it is implied that they are now back together.

After being dumped by Linda, Max begins drinking and thinking of ways to win her back. Jack sees Mick at the police station and overhears him talking about being sexually abused as a child. Jack tells this to Max, who now believes Linda only dumped him out of pity to Mick. Max steals a file from Jack that contains evidence of all Phil Mitchell's crimes. Max uses this to blackmail Phil into convincing Sharon to sign The Queen Vic back to Mick. He believes this will show Linda how much he cares for her and will be enough to win her back. Phil and Sharon agree to it and Max is happy that his plan is working. As this is happening, Mick walks into The Queen Vic and tells Max to stay away from Linda. Max doesn't listen which leads to Mick punching him. Jack takes Max home and confronts him about the file that he stole and used to threaten Phil. Linda then walks in and also confronts Max for using Mick's trauma to his advantage. She tells him to leave Walford and Jack agrees. Later that day, Phil visits the Carters and offers them The Queen Vic back. They decide to take the offer just as Max leaves Albert Square.

Months later, Linda begins feeling sick and discovers she is pregnant. Linda tells Mick and he is over the moon about the idea of them having another baby, although she later reveals that it's Max's. Although uneasy, Mick tells Linda he will raise the baby as his own. Rainie Cross, who is trying to get Max to return to the Square, becomes suspicious of Linda and threatens to tell Max that he has a baby on the way. Linda later gives birth to a daughter, whom she calls Annie. Mick, Linda and Ollie later leave to live in Elaine's pub as they fear Max will return, however a few weeks later, Mick and Ollie return to Walford alone without Linda. At Christmas time, Linda is visited by Janine Butcher (Charlie Brooks), under the name of Judith, who unknown to her, has moved into The Queen Vic and is trying to take advantage of Mick. Linda later drinks alcohol after being manipulated by Janine. Nancy later visits her to find her drunk. Nancy gives her an ultimatum; alcohol or a family. Linda chooses alcohol and later phones Mick telling him that she wants a divorce.

Linda returns at Tina's funeral, following her murder by Gray Atkins (Toby-Alexander Smith), where she finds out that Mick and Janine are in a relationship. Linda returns to the Queen Vic where she argues and fights with Janine. After Janine scams Nancy and Zack out of £50,000 to give to Linda in an attempt for her to leave Walford, Linda invests the money in the 'Fox and Hair' salon, unaware that the money that Janine gave her was from scammed from Nancy and Zack who wanted to buy a restaurant. Linda is later involved in a car crash with Janine and Annie after she and Janine argue over Mick. Janine moves an unconscious Linda into the driver seat to make it look like Linda was driving under the influence. Linda falls into a coma for the next few days and once she awakens, is disowned by her family who are unaware of Janine's actions. Linda loses custody of Annie as a result of Jada Lennox (Kelsey Calladine-Smith) setting her up after being forced by Janine but eventually, Linda gets Annie back. As Mick and Janine's relationship leads them both to being engaged, Linda learns that they are both having a baby and she accepts that her and Mick's time together is over and finds it difficult to move on. After having some doubts, Linda encourages Mick to marry Janine for the sake of his and Janine's unborn baby. Mick later marries Janine after taking Linda's advice. Linda later rekindles her relationship with Mick and they agree to try again following the revelation that Janine manipulated Mick and that she was responsible for the crash. As Janine attempts to escape to evade justice, Linda and Mick follow Janine to Dover. Linda phones the police on Janine but as she tries to escape after hurting Mick, Linda gets into the car and it crashes into the sea where Linda pleads to Mick to save Janine and their unborn baby. After saving Janine, Mick rushes back into the sea to save Linda, unaware that she managed to escape the car. Linda is heartbroken and distraught as Mick becomes lost at sea and is presumed dead. This results in Linda leaving Walford to meet up with her children to tell them what happened to Mick.

Linda returns to Walford weeks later, walking in to The Queen Vic where Alfie throws a tropical-themed party. Linda is furious and asks everyone to leave. After talking with Alfie, she decides to sell The Queen Vic but after talking with Patrick, she changes her mind and prepares to find a buyer for Mick's share of the pub which was inherited by Janine. Linda is left shaken when she discovers Shirley has reunited with Dean after grieving the loss of Mick, and is comforted by Kathy Beale (Gillian Taylforth) who reassures her that there are people that care about her. Later on, Linda receives two bidders for The Queen Vic: Sharon and also Nish (Navin Chowdhry) and Suki Panesar (Balvinder Sopal) but Linda later starts arranging another buyer which later is revealed to be Elaine (now portrayed by Harriet Thorpe), Linda's mother. After lying to Sharon, they both fall out as Elaine walks in, revealing she is the new co-landlady of The Queen Vic.

Weeks later, Linda meets George Knight (Colin Salmon), Elaine's partner, and his daughters, Gina (Francesca Henry) and Anna (Molly Rainford), who turn up at The Vic unannounced, with Elaine not telling Linda that George and the girls would be moving in with them. George reveals to Linda that he would be running The Queen Vic alongside Elaine, much to Linda's anger as Elaine co-owns The Queen Vic. Linda and George feud over several weeks with Linda investigating the whereabouts of George's ex-wife, Rose Knight, who is later revealed to be Cindy Beale (Michelle Collins). Linda later rekindles her friendship with Sharon after Anna deliberately locks them in the barrel store at The Queen Vic to mend their friendship. In the following months, Linda is left shocked when Dean returns and enters unannounced, claiming that he is back in Walford in aid of his daughter Jade whose cystic fibrosis has worsened. Having been traumatised, Linda determines to stay away from Dean but after he is revealed to be Ian and Cindy's silent partner in their new pie and mash shop business, Linda takes a stand and with Alfie's help, she leads a campaign in an attempt for people to boycott the pie and mash shop. Linda is later accused by Dean of having vandalised the front of the shop, which she denied. After being punched by George, Dean considers going to the police, but instead successfully blackmails Linda into telling him that he did not rape her which he records on tape. Linda later relapses and begins drinking again after Dean plays out the recording in front of everyone in the Vic as the community declare their support for Linda as it will be her first Christmas without Mick. As a result of the recording, people continue to side with Linda however Gina starts to doubt Linda's honesty and begins growing closer to Dean. Linda continues to be tormented by Dean, which ends up in her assaulting him after he resorts to pretending to be Mick texting her in order for her to meet him.

After comforting Sharon following the call-off of her wedding with Keanu, Linda gathers in The Queen Vic with Sharon, Denise, Kathy, Stacey and Suki. The women encourage Suki to stand up to her abusive husband Nish, and a scuffle occurs which results in Denise bludgeoning Nish with a champagne bottle. With Nish presumed dead on the floor, Keanu enters the pub and discovers what has happened. He argues with Sharon following their wedding not going ahead before attempting to strangle Sharon in anger. While Nish regains consciousness, Keanu dies when Linda stabs him in the back in order to save Sharon. After The Six frame Dean for Keanu's murder, Linda's alcohol abuse further declines and she is found unconscious having choked on her own vomit. She recovers, however after Dean admits he raped her at his trial but isn't guilty of killing Keanu, Linda confesses to Keanu's murder. After the police don't believe her claim, Linda leaves and confronts Bernadette Taylor (Clair Norris) to tell her what happened, Bernadette strangles Linda and nearly kills her but stops herself. Bernadette then leaves Walford, leading Linda to be anxious about the thought of the police coming to arrest her. This prompts Linda to tell Elaine that she killed Keanu which leads to a falling out between them after Linda tells Elaine that she will put custody of Ollie and Annie to her if she gets arrested. They later make up and Elaine promises that she will be there for Linda no matter what happens.

On Halloween, Nish finds out what happened at Christmas after Kathy slipped up before the six women were asked in for questioning. He summons all of the women to the Vic and asks Linda where she stabbed Keanu. After initially believing that Nish phoned the police on them, it is revealed that Nish falsified a story claiming that he killed Keanu and that he threatened Linda into blackmailing as part of the murder. This leads to Nish being arrested for the murder, leaving Linda in the clear. In November 2024, Bernie confronts Linda and tells her that she will be going to the police after she returned from Germany. After Bernie confronts Sharon and Stacey, they tell Bernie that she has no evidence and they further silence her when they question Bernie on what if Karen found out that she knew for months what happened and never told her. This leads Bernie to not tell anyone else, cementing Linda's place in the clear.

During Elaine's hen night, Elaine reveals to Linda that her father was secretly gay after his partner, Drew Peacock (Paul Clayton) is hired as a drag queen at the hen night. This leaves Linda distraught and leads to her fighting with Elaine who slaps her after exchanging harsh words. Linda's drinking continues to spiral out of control and after learning from Johnny that Ollie doesn't like being around her she goes to live with Sharon two weeks before Christmas 2024 but Sharon's house is burgled when Linda leaves the door open. A drunken Linda enters the café and confronts Bernadette who tells her that she regrets telling her to drink to death, and that she didn't want to be responsible for her death, this results in Bernadette forgiving Linda for killing Keanu but warns her not to use her or Keanu as an excuse. Eventually she falls asleep on an outdoor bench at night having distanced all who cared about her. Elaine returns from her honeymoon finding out how far Linda's alcoholism has gone and gives her an ultimatum – to either choose to live on the streets and continue drinking, or go to rehab. Elaine tries to pack a bag for Linda to take to rehab, however Linda doesn't want to go and pushes Elaine, which Ollie witnesses. Linda then blames Elaine for her alcoholism by accusing her of turning a blind-eye while she was brought up in a pub, and failing to stop her from drinking. Johnny gives Linda a drawing that Ollie has made, showing Linda pouring alcohol into her mouth, although she doesn't look at it and so doesn't realise this. After Elaine threatens to call the police to report the assault if Linda tries to return, she chooses to continue drinking, stumbling out of The Queen Vic with a bottle of vodka. She looks at the drawing Ollie has made and scrunches it up, throwing it on the ground. She then appears to down most of the bottle of vodka, before experiencing a vision of what will happen to her if she continues drinking, including her imminent death, subsequent funeral, her family being torn apart and Johnny becoming an alcoholic. Following this realisation, she instead pours the entire vodka bottle out, before picking up the drawing Ollie made for her and bursting into tears. She then returns to The Queen Vic, admitting that she needs help and will go to rehab, although apprehensive about whether she will be able to quit drinking.

Linda returns from rehab in February 2025 and organises the wedding of Billy (Perry Fenwick) and Honey Mitchell (Emma Barton). Upon discovering that Phil- who is experiencing severe depression- has relapsed, she goes to his house to confront him, where she discovers a suicide note he has left for Sharon. Horrified, she informs Phil's brother Grant (Ross Kemp) and close friend Nigel Bates (Paul Bradley); the three rush to the garage and stop Phil from shooting himself. Linda eventually convinces Phil to seek medical advice and supports him as he enters a mental health clinic; she is later horrified when she discovers the Vic has been destroyed by an explosion accidentally caused by Reiss Colwell (Jonny Freeman) and Cindy. After the Vic has been rebuilt, Linda sells the pub to Kat Slater (Jessie Wallace) and leaves for a cruise with Johnny, Ollie and Annie.

Five months later, Linda returns to Walford and is angry to discover Elaine has spent a majority of their money from the pub on her new boutique hotel, Peacock Palace. Linda also finds that Max is back in Walford, and is worried he will find out Annie is his daughter, which Max's family know but have kept secret from him. However, following a conversation with Max's daughter Lauren (Jacqueline Jossa), Linda decides to tell Max the truth and they begin to bond, co-parenting Annie together and developing a mutual attraction, especially after Max threatens and scares off Tim Walton (Tom Ratcliffe), who had been blackmailing Johnny. Her interference, however, leads to her estrangement from Johnny when he is angered over her interference in his burgeoning relationship with Callum. Max and Linda share a kiss, but nothing else happens. She later witnesses Max and Cindy having sex, making her jealous when they begin a relationship. Linda attends a school reunion where she sees Bea Pollard (Ronni Ancona) who she used to bully at school; Bea later develops an obsessive attachment to Linda's friend, Honey. Linda shows support to Phil and Nigel's wife Julie Bates (Karen Henthorn) when Nigel dies in April 2026, reuniting with Grant when he stays at the boutique hotel. He flirts with her and helps to repair Linda's fractured relationship with Johnny. Linda and Grant have a brief, casual fling before he returns home to Portugal. Linda later begins dating the local councillor, Clive Masters (Jason Durr), but ends things with Clive when she realises she is still in love with Max. On the eve of his wedding, she tells Max she is in love with him, unaware that Max had been cheating on his fiancée Cindy with Priya Nandra-Hart (Sophie Khan Levy) who is expecting his child despite being engaged to Ravi Gulati (Aaron Thiara). Linda finds out about the affair with Priya and resolves to stop the wedding, but decides against it at the last minute. Max suffers a heart attack shortly after marrying Cindy. In the hospital, he breaks things off with Cindy, leaving her devastated, and admits he reciprocates Linda's feelings. The two begin a relationship.

Linda is stunned when Nancy and Lee return to Walford, and Nancy announces she is acting as a surrogate for Lee and his partner, Jess Fang (Emma Lau), who is unable to carry a child to term. Linda becomes suspicious when Lee claims Jess had suddenly walked out on him, wanting nothing to do with their baby. She later discovers that Lee had lied and had driven Jess away due to his growing alcoholism, caused by his grief over Mick’s disappearance, and that Jess still wants to be apart of their baby’s life. Lee still holds hope that Mick is alive and revokes his death certificate without Linda’s knowledge. Linda is further floored after receiving news that Mick’s body has been found after four years. Janine, as Mick’s legal widow, is his next of kin and has control over his funeral arrangements, and has his death certificate reinstated. Linda and Max track Janine down, where they clash; Janine claims that Mick had in fact been alive and living in North London for the past few years, having abandoned his family after going missing, and had died of a heart attack just two weeks earlier. Linda cannot bring herself to look at the body and asks Max to do it for her. Janine tells Max privately that she is unsure if it is Mick’s body in the coffin, admitting she needs him to be definitively dead so she can inherit money from his life insurance. Janine encourages Max to lie to Linda that it was in fact Mick’s body, so he can ease his insecurities about their relationship and Linda’s remaining love for Mick. Max tells Linda that Mick is definitely dead, leaving her devastated. The stress of this news of causes Nancy to go into labour, and she gives birth to Lee and Jess’s son, Michael, named after his grandfather. Lee’s alcoholism continues to spiral, but after a heart-to-heart with Linda, he agrees to attend rehab. Now secure in his relationship, Max proposes marriage to Linda, and she accepts.

== Other appearances ==
Linda appears in animated form in a Children in Need sketch called Tom and Jerry: A Fundraising Adventure, broadcast during the 2014 telethon on 14 November 2014, along with Mick in The Queen Vic. In the sketch, cartoon cat and mouse duo Tom and Jerry visit several animated versions of BBC stars, tasked by Terry Wogan to raise cash. Linda is not voiced in the sketch.

== Reception ==
Along with Dyer, Bright was nominated for "Best On-screen Partnership" at The British Soap Awards 2014 for the relationship between Mick and Linda. However, they lost out to David Neilson and Julie Hesmondhalgh, who play Roy and Hayley Cropper respectively in Coronation Street. Kate White from Inside Soap was pleased to see Linda's backstory explored, saying "Now we know a bit about Linda's past and what made her a control freak, she's finally a sympathetic character. We liked her already, but we love her now!" Bright won the awards for "Best Actress" and "Best Dramatic Performance" at The British Soap Awards 2015. In August 2017, Bright and Dyer were longlisted for Best Partnership and the showdown between Mick and Linda was longlisted for Best Show-Stopper. Neither nomination made the viewer-voted shortlist. Linda's pairing with Mick came in second place in the "Best Soap Couple" category at the 2018 Digital Spy Reader Awards with 10.6% of the total votes. In a 2021 Radio Times poll, Mick and Linda were voted as the joint sixth "soap pub landlord", receiving 6% of the votes.

In 2020, Sara Wallis and Ian Hyland from The Daily Mirror placed Linda 21st on their ranked list of the best EastEnders characters of all time, referring to her as a "Bun-haired, flamingo-loving Queen Vic landlady".
