= Natascha Wharton =

British film producer

- Born: June 1965 (age 60–61); Trinidad, Trinidad and Tobago
- Occupations: Senior Production Executive, BFI
- Years active: 1991 – present

Natascha Maria Wharton (born June 1965) is a British film producer and founder of WT^{2} Productions, an independent film production company, and subsidiary of Working Title Films.

== Biography ==
Wharton was born in Trinidad to a German mother and Trinidadian father.

Prior to joining Working Title Films, Wharton served as an assistant to producer Eric Fellner, who would later co-own the company. She joined Working Title in 1993, serving as an assistant to Fellner and Working Title co-founder Tim Bevan. Wharton later became a development executive for the company and, in 1999, established Working Title's subsidiary WT^{2} Productions as a production company that produced independent films. Films produced under the WT^{2} production banner include Shaun of the Dead, Billy Elliot, The Calcium Kid and Ali G Indahouse.

Wharton left Working Title in July 2009. She is currently the head of development and production executive for the British Film Institute's Film Fund.

== Filmography ==
Year	Film	Role
1991	A Kiss Before Dying	Assistant to Eric Fellner
1994	Four Weddings and a Funeral	Assistant to Tim Bevan and Eric Fellner
1996	Loch Ness	Assistant to Tim Bevan and Eric Fellner
1998	What Rats Won't Do	Associate producer
1999	Plunkett & Macleane	Co-producer
2000	Billy Elliot	Executive producer
2002	Long Time Dead	Executive producer
2002	Ali G Indahouse	Executive producer
2002	My Little Eye	Executive producer
2004	Shaun of the Dead	Executive producer
2004	The Calcium Kid	Producer
2004	Mickybo and Me	Executive producer
2004	Inside I'm Dancing	Executive producer
2006	Sixty Six	Executive producer
2007	Hot Fuzz	Executive producer
2007	Mr. Bean's Holiday	Head of development for Working Title
2007	Gone	Executive producer
2007	Atonement	Head of development for Working Title
2011
2011	Paul	Executive producer
