= Bea Pollard =

Fictional character from EastEnders

- EastEnders character
- Portrayed by: Ronni Ancona
- First appearance: Episode 7257; 7 January 2026
- Last appearance: Episode 7361; 8 July 2026
- Introduced by: Ben Wadey
In-universe information
- Occupation: Shop assistant Food service worker

Bea Pollard is a fictional character from the BBC soap opera EastEnders, played by Ronni Ancona. She made her first appearance on 7 January 2026 when she was introduced as a former school acquaintance of Linda Carter (Kellie Bright). It transpires that Linda bullied Bea at school and when she is made homeless, Linda takes her in, moving her to Walford. Comedian and impressionist Ronni Ancona was attracted to the role since she found Bea to be unpredictable, complex and enjoyed her dark humour. In June 2026, it was announced that Ancona would be leaving the show and that Bea would depart in a "dramatic storyline". She left on 8 July 2026.

Ben Wadey, the executive producer responsible for overseeing Bea's creation, wanted to bring in a character who is tragic yet funny. Throughout her tenure, Bea has been shown to be a mentally unhinged, desperate and vulnerable person who reshapes herself into different versions of herself to please others. One of her major storyline arcs has included becoming obsessed with Honey Mitchell (Emma Barton) and attempting to steal her identity by moving in with her, getting the same job as her, taking out a credit card in her name and committing credit card fraud and dressing identically. She also endures a short-lived relationship with Ian Beale (Adam Woodyatt) until he discovers her crimes. Bea's obsession with Honey continues over the following months, and she manipulates her into thinking Billy has propositioned her. She subsequently embarks on a reign of terror in which she attempts to frame Billy for her murder, before kidnapping Honey and ultimately being arrested.

Bea has been noted as a polarising character and has sparked discussion between viewers and critics about her intentions. The Metro has noted that some viewers love her, while some hate her, and she has dubbed "bizarre Bea", "Walford's weirdest" and "bonkers Bea". The character was the subject of viral posts in March 2026 when an anonymous person phoned into the Channel 5 chat show Vanessa impersonating Bea.

== Casting and characterisation ==
It was announced on 6 December 2025 that comedian and impressionist Ronni Ancona had been cast on EastEnders as Bea, a new character set to appear the following month. It was reported that Ancona had already begun filming for the soap at the time. Ancona was honoured to be cast on the soap, describing it as an "iconic institution". Ancona had previously imitated various EastEnders characters including Peggy Mitchell (Barbara Windsor), Sharon Watts (Letitia Dean) and Kat Slater (Jessie Wallace) and admitted she felt nervous to meet the cast she had impersonated. However, she found they had a great sense of humour and revealed Wallace did Ancona's impression of Kat back at her, which she found "hysterical".

Ancona was excited to portray the character of Bea, describing her as an "unpredictable, nuanced and complex" and admitted that it was Bea's storyline and dark humour that attracted her to the role. Bea is shown to be a desperate and vulnerable person who reshapes herself into who she believes others want her to be. Bea's backstory involves having never achieved what she had hoped for, so encountering a constant sense of frustration that she is not living up to her potential. Ancona admitted that Bea can be dangerous, but felt she is misunderstood and merely "wants to be loved and to fit in". She hoped that viewers would have fun watching her. Executive producer Ben Wadey, responsible for overseeing Ancona's casting, said: "I'm delighted to welcome the immensely talented Ronni Ancona to EastEnders playing the character of Bea. Bea's character is mysterious, and we're thrilled to have an esteemed actress and comedian like Ronni playing her." Wadey is a fan of comedy and his intention was to bring in a character who is tragic yet funny.

== Development ==
=== Introduction ===
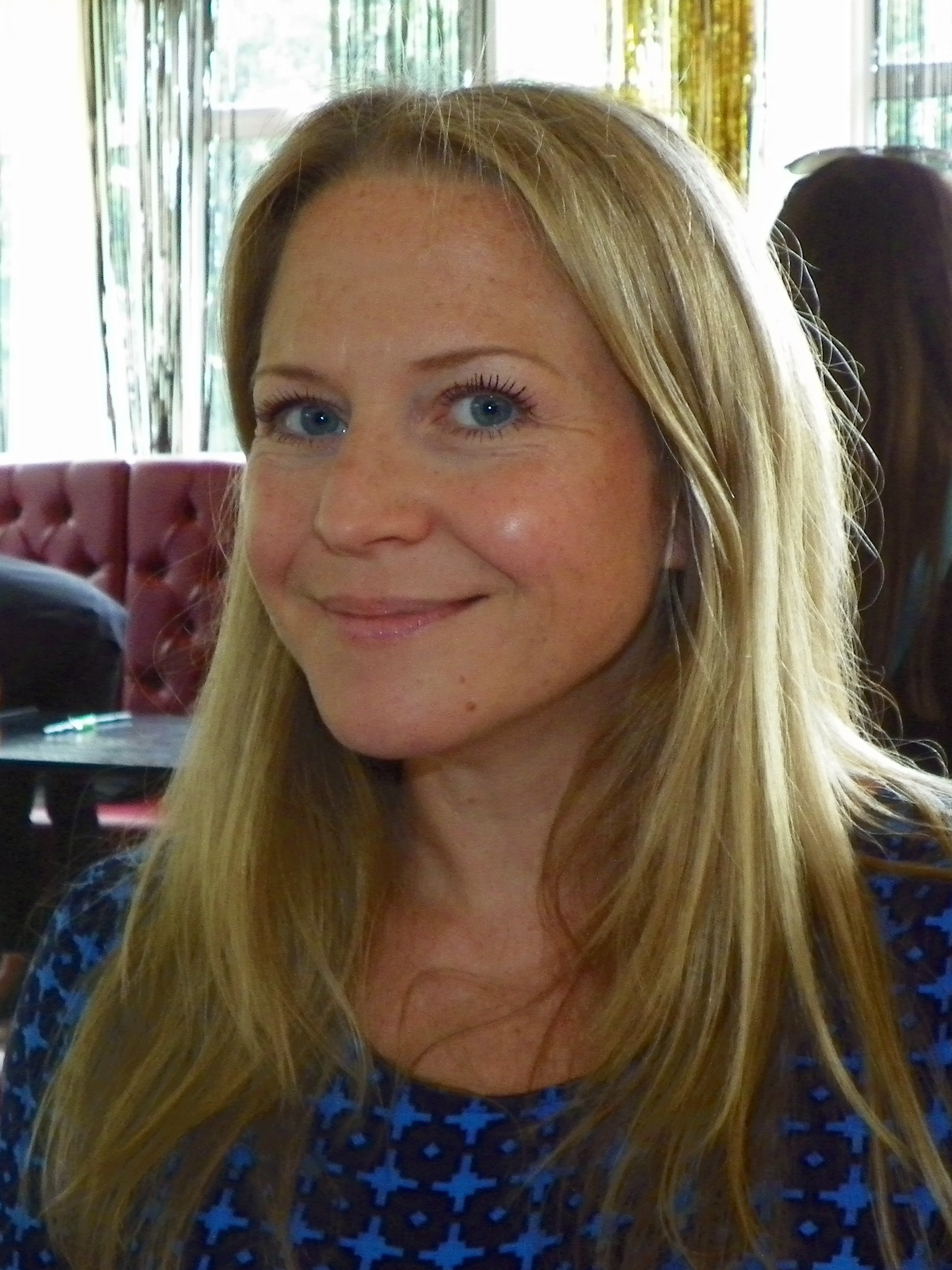
Bea is introduced as an old school acquaintance of Linda Carter (Kellie Bright) and it transpires that Linda and her friends bullied Bea.

Ahead of Bea's initial appearance, it was confirmed that she would be introduced as an old school acquaintance of Linda Carter (Kellie Bright). Linda is accompanied by Honey Mitchell (Emma Barton) to a school reunion, but upon realising only former students can attend, Honey pretends to be Bea. However, they encounter the real Bea. Linda is "mortified" when she recalls what Linda was like back at school; a bully who made Bea feel alone and different from other children. Linda objects to Bea's accusations and leaves with Honey, but later realises she has accidentally taken Bea's handbag. They find Bea's house and Linda arrives with "a slice of humble pie" as she admits to her past behaviour and apologises. However, the pair find Bea being thrown out of her flat by Marcus (Neil Haigh), her landlord. Linda feels bad for her and invites her to stay in Peacock Palace, a B&B she co-owns with her mother, Elaine Peacock (Harriet Thorpe). It was teased by OK! that Bea would settle into Walford and would end up being at "the heart of the drama", leaving a "lasting impression" on the characters she meets. At the B&B, she is persistent in trying to pursue fellow guest Max Branning (Jake Wood), but he rejects her. Wanting "twisted revenge" on him for the setback, Bea informs Elaine that Louie Beale (Jake McNally), Max's grandson, is bullying Ollie Carter (Harry Farr), Linda's son, and that Max knew.

Bea realises that Honey works in the Minute Mart, the local convenience shop. Determined to stick around in Walford and having taken a shine to Honey, she soon "becomes obsessed" with the idea of working there. Bea intercepts a shoplifter, sparking the idea to Honey that Bea should work alongside her. Bea then hatches a "sinister plan" to secure herself a job at the shop; she "coincidentally" arrives as two teenagers are trashing the shop, telling them to get out and protecting Honey. She is rewarded by Vinny Panesar (Shiv Jalota) with a month-long trial there, after which it is revealed that Bea asked the teenagers to set the scene up for her. An EastEnders produced stated: "only time will tell whether she’ll keep up the hard work once her foot is in the door, or whether the do-gooder façade will slip..."

=== Stealing Honey Mitchell's identity ===
Honey has a fall at work; Bea assists her recovery, during which manager Suki Panesar-Unwin (Balvinder Sopal) orders them to get back to work. Bea is "aghast" and steals a bottle of wine from the shop, which she drinks in front of the CCTV. She then informs Honey that they should pursue legal action, asking for any information they could use. Honey confides in Bea about Suki trying to kiss her years prior, after which Bea decides they should draft an email to Suki, threatening her with a sexual harassment case. Very drunk, Honey accidentally sends the email and is fired, which Honey's husband Billy Mitchell (Perry Fenwick) blames Bea for. Bea then risks her own job trying to get Honey's back, in an attempt to "sweeten her up". Honey, described as "too sweet-natured for her own good sometimes", invites Bea to housesit for her, which was hinted as a "catastrophic mistake". Whilst there, she is rejected for a credit card and instead applies for one in Honey's name, committing credit card fraud.

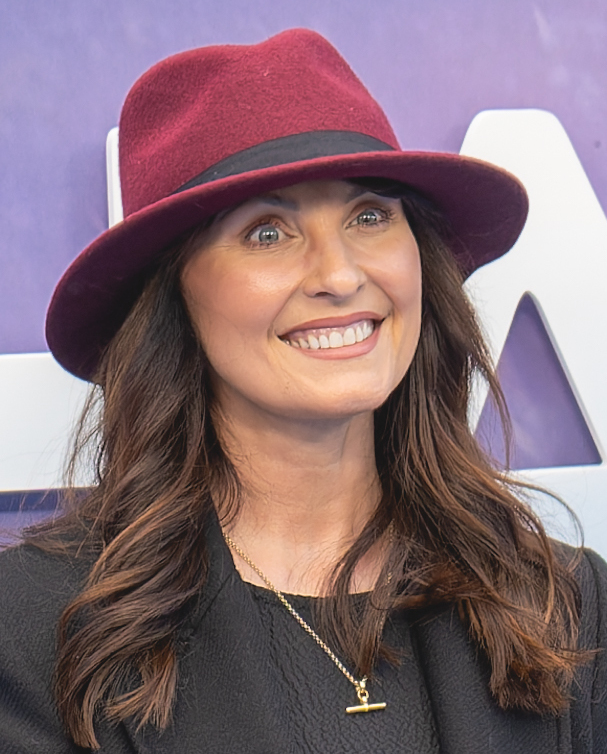
Bea becomes obsessed with Honey Mitchell (Emma Barton) and steals her identity.

Unable to return to Peacock Palace, Bea finesses her way into continuing to live in Honey's family home. Billy returns with his and Honey's children, Will (Freddie Phillips) and Janet Mitchell (Grace), while Honey cares for her aunt off-screen. Bea's "warped mind" views it as an opportunity to replace Honey. Bea was billed "the house-sitter from hell" since she has left a mess and eaten all of their food. However, keen to make amends, she starts buying the family gifts on her illegal credit card and vows to get a job, securing herself a position at McKlunky's, a local kebab shop. Billy soon believes she is "becoming obsessed with them all" and rages at Bea when he learns she has gotten Will a job at Harry's Barn, a local bar. With Billy believing she has stepped too far, Digital Spy wrote that she had gone from a "ruthless fraudster" to deluding herself into believing that she is the new Honey.

Honey returns and begins to experience symptoms of the menopause, and wanting to deal with it privately, she asks Bea to more out of their home. With Bea "furiously reeling from the rejection", she kicks all of the diners out of McKlunky's and trashes it, with a producer joking that they would not "count on her passing her probation period" at the kebab shop. Will finds her surrounded by her destruction and she claims that she was attacked for sympathy. In response, Will convinces Honey and Billy to allow Bea to stay on at their house. Bea uses the illegal credit card to purchase Honey a private hormone profiling session due to her symptoms, much to Honey's pleasure.

Bea takes a dislike to Billy and later learns from Kim Fox (Tameka Empson) that he cheated on Honey years prior, after which they split for a while. She is furious at him and accuses him of "overstepping" when he compliments her outfit. She later buys a new mattress for her temporary room at their house, to which Billy confronts her. A furious Bea storms off into Walford and overhears Denise Fox (Diane Parish) talking about Patrick Trueman's (Rudolph Walker) use of artificial intelligence (AI). Bea's interest is "piqued" and she downloads an AI app that manipulates Billy's voice into saying "I am Billy Mitchell and I am a prize sausage", to which she finds amusing. However, it was hinted by Radio Times that she would use the app for more devious means.

=== Interest in Ian Beale ===
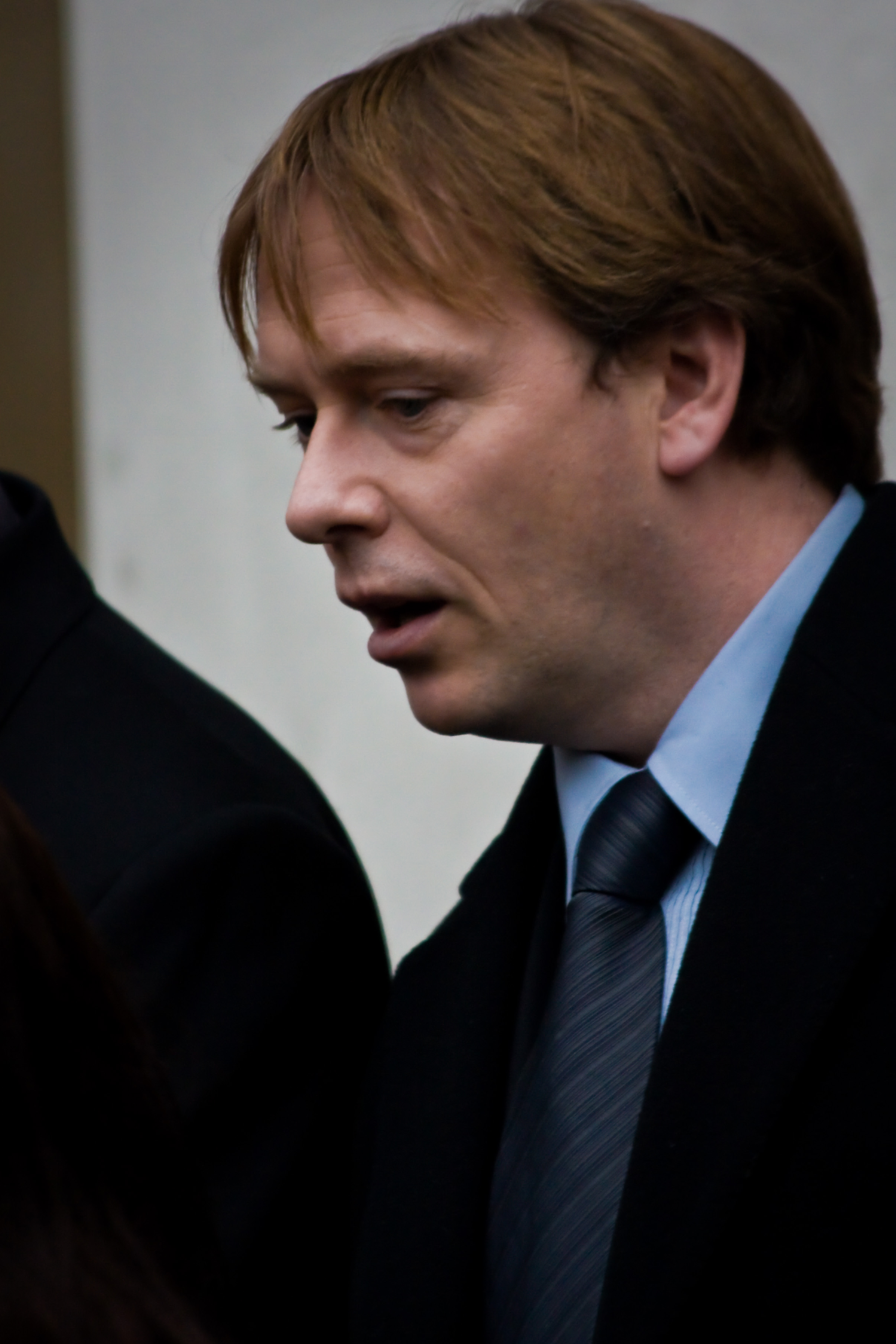
Bea becomes obsessed with Ian Beale (Adam Woodyatt).

Bea "closes in on her next target" when she becomes interested in Ian Beale (Adam Woodyatt). She becomes intrigued by Ian after learning that he is running against Elaine to be a councillor for Walford and asks him on a date; upset by his disappointing campaign turnout, he agrees. Metro wondered if Bea was merely interested in Ian's money or if she was genuinely interested in him, as well as wondering if she would back away from Honey. However, her obsession with Honey instead heads "in an even darker direction" when she learns that Honey and Billy are heading for a date night. A "consumed" Bea buys an identical dress to Honey and plans a date for her and Ian at the same time, inviting herself onto their table. She then pays for everyone's food with her fraudulent credit card. Speaking about her character Honey's connection to Bea, actress Barton stated: "Honey sees Bea as a lost soul and naturally wants to help her, especially given how much Bea has been there for Honey's family recently. Although Billy remains sceptical, Honey chooses to see the good in people and trusts Bea, although perhaps a little too much..."

Bea notices how much money she has racked up on her illegitimate credit card and tries to take back the dress she bought to Penny Branning (Kitty Castledine), who refuses to refund her. She "turns nasty" and rips an outfit on her stall and tells her the clothes are poorly made. She confides in Honey that she has racked up money issues but has found a flat to finally move out of their house, but claims she is short on money for a deposit. Honey and Billy lend the money to a thankful Bea, but she later goes to the Queen Vic and develops a "utterly bizarre plan" for the money. She offers to pay for her and Ian to go to wine tasting, glass blowing and a helicopter ride over the city, which was billed a "montage of random dates that would make Married at First Sight Australia blush". Bea becomes committed to helping Ian win the election by constantly canvassing votes for him. She finds herself "in hot water" when she makes a video slandering Elaine to strengthen Ian's chances of winning the election. Ian initially agrees to Bea posting the video and she carries out her "vile revenge" against Elaine, but their relationship turns awry when it goes viral and causes Ian issues.

=== Revenge and homelessness ===
Ian ends his relationship with Bea and eventually discovers her credit card fraud in Honey's name. He is horrified to learn Bea used it to pay for election votes and exposes her to Honey. Ancona stated that this may be "the tip of the iceberg when it comes to Bea's villainous actions". She warned it would get "so much darker" for both Honey and Billy and hinted that as Bea "increasingly spirals", she becomes more and more dangerous. Ancona explained that when Bea is angry, she blacks out and switches to perform "deeply malevolent" actions.

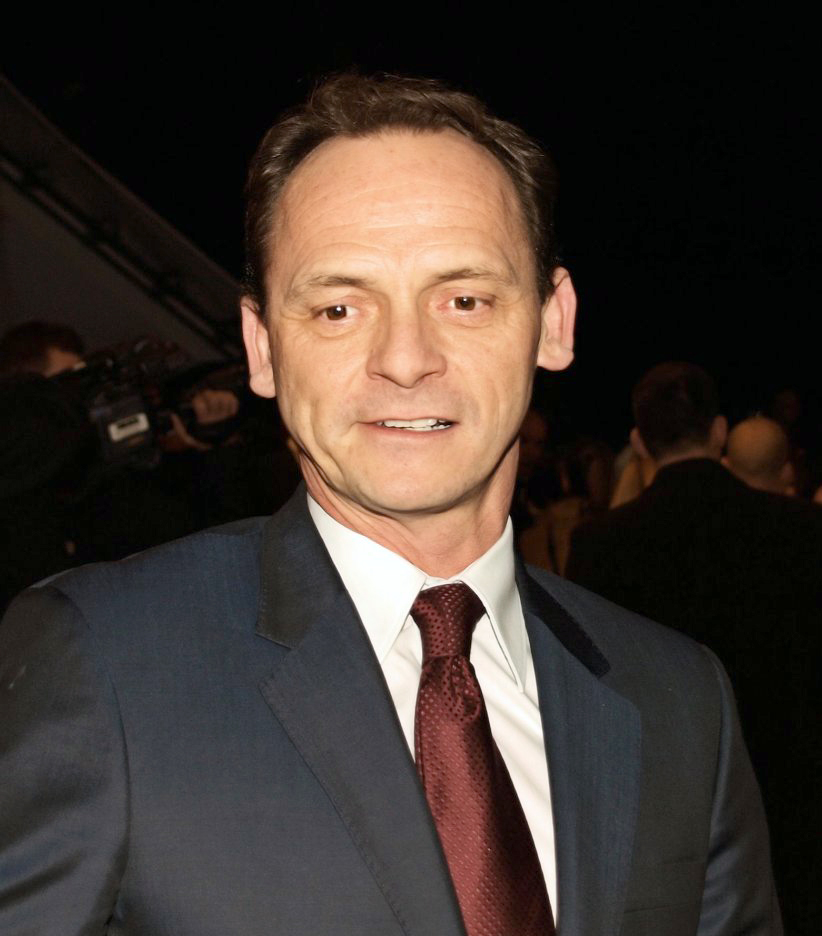
Bea sees Billy Mitchell (Perry Fenwick) as a "problem".

Having been exposed, Bea feels that her time is running out, which in turn, fuels her as a "warped sense of self preservation". Ancona reckoned that Bea is lonely which becomes "catastrophically damaging" for her. She sees a bond with Honey and is not ready to give it up, which leads to Billy becoming her main target. Ancona said that although Billy is a simple man who wants the best for his family, Bea despises him as he can see through Bea's actions, making him a "problem" for the character. Bea makes her "darkest move yet" when she tampers with the safety latch Billy's ladder, sneaking off afterwards and attempting to make up with Ian, which fails. With "her life seemingly falling apart", she heads to McKlunky's to sleep for the night, homeless.

Honey goes up the ladder that Bea has tampered with, falling off and becoming unconscious. Bea hears her fall and panicked, she rushes to McKlunky's to work a sudden shift as an alibi. With Honey needing surgery, Bea attempts to use the chaos for her own benefit and offers to run the house for them, but Billy refuses. Bea then hits "rock bottom", once again sleeping on the floor of McKlunky's with dropped chips in her hair as she looks emotionally at a photograph of herself alongside Honey, Will and Janet. Despite belief that it would be the end of Bea's acts against the Mitchells, Metro recalled Bea's usage of an AI app and wrote that it would be "a trick up her sleeve to get back into Honey's life".

== Storylines ==
When Linda Carter (Kellie Bright) and her friend Honey Mitchell (Emma Barton) attend Linda’s school reunion, Honey uses Bea’s name badge in order to gain entry. Bea later confronts Honey over stealing her identity and reveals Linda and her friends bullied her in school. Honey later discovers she has accidentally taken Bea’s bag home with her, and upon trying to return it, they find Bea being kicked out by her landlord due to her keys having been in the bag Honey took. Feeling sorry for her, Linda invites her to stay at the B&B she owns in Walford. Feeling guilty about the way she treated Bea at school, Linda asks her friend Max Branning (Jake Wood) to take Bea out for the day, but Bea ends up spraining her ankle, and Max leaves her in order to attend a family celebration instead. Taking pity on her, Honey spends the evening with Bea and they become friends.

Bea later earns a trial shift at the Minute Mart alongside Honey, but seeing the way their boss Suki Panesar (Balvinder Sopal) treats Honey, Bea encourages her to stand up for herself. After an evening drinking, they drunkenly write up an email to Suki accusing her of sexual harassment which Honey accidentally sends. This results in both Bea and Honey being fired. Bea later manages to persuade Suki’s son Vinny Panesar (Shiv Jalota) to reinstate Honey after a break in which Bea set up, but Bea is not allowed to continue working there. Linda later tires of Bea’s presence at the B&B and asks her to leave. Once again taking pity on her, Honey asks her to move into her house whilst she and her husband Billy Mitchell (Perry Fenwick) are on holiday.

Bea gains another job working at McClunky’s, but as she has no money, she fraudulently opens a credit card in Honey’s name. She bonds with Honey and Billy’s children Will (Freddie Phillips) and Janet Mitchell (Grace), but clashes with Billy due to his unease at her presence in their home. She uses the credit card in order to support the family and buy extravagant gifts, including booking Honey an appointment at a private clinic for her perimenopause. When Honey and Billy ask her to move out, she trashes McClunky’s and lies that it was robbed in order to gain sympathy and prolong her stay at Number 18. She later begins dating local businessman Ian Beale (Adam Woodyatt) and assists him with his campaign to be elected councillor, including making a campaign video smearing his rival, Linda’s mother Elaine Peacock (Harriet Thorpe), which ensures his eventual victory. Ian later decides to end his relationship with Bea, to which she reacts badly and lies that she ended things with him. Ian later discovers she has spent on election materials using a credit card in Honey’s name and reveals this to Honey. Whilst Billy is angry at her deceit and demands Bea move out and be reported for fraud, Honey takes a more sympathetic stance and decides not to report her to the police, although does ask her to move out. Bea then tampers with a ladder Billy is due to use in order to do the guttering on the house, but Honey climbs up it instead and ends up seriously injured after falling which Bea feels guilty for but keeps her actions concealed.

After initially sleeping in McClunky’s, Bea is invited to stay at Number 31 with Mo Harris (Laila Morse). Bea continues to try and support Honey after she comes home from hospital by helping with the cooking and cleaning, which riles Billy as he continually asks her to leave his family alone. Billy’s cousin Phil Mitchell (Steve McFadden) offers Bea money to leave Walford, but she reveals this to Honey, as well as a fake dating profile that she set up for Billy, and lies that he tried to make a move on her which is why he has been so desperate to get rid of her. After manipulating Honey, she persuades her to kick Billy out and invite her to move back in. Bea then continues to unravel, dressing similarly to Honey and spiking Linda’s drink with gin despite her being a recovering alcoholic, which Honey defends Bea from when she is accused, alienating her from her friends. Bea then persuades Honey to burn Billy’s belongings. After finding a crochet doll of Billy, that Bea had decapitated, Honey begins to doubt her, and meets her ex-friend Ruth, whom Bea had also manipulated into letting her move in, before driving a wedge between her and her husband. Ruth tells Honey that after being cut off, Bea set fire to her house, killing her dog and leaving her husband in need of skin grafts. Meanwhile Billy once again confronts Bea and accidentally pushes her to the floor. Upon leaving, Bea proceeds to trash the house, make it seem as though she has bled everywhere, and then calls the police accusing Billy of trying to kill her, before disappearing. As Honey tries to clear Billy's name, she holds a fake vigil in the Square, dedicating it to Bea and posting it on social media. This lures Bea back to the Square. She kidnaps Honey and holds her hostage in a cottage in Kent. However, Honey manages to escape and is rescued by Linda, Suki, and Nicola Mitchell (Laura Doddington). Honey returns to the Square, where she reunites with Billy, after her statement about her kidnap releases Billy from custody. Bea follows her and threatens to kill Billy. However, Honey saves him and Bea is arrested for kidnap and perverting the course of justice. Linda visits Bea to apologise for bullying her at school and encouraging her to take accountability for her actions which Bea remains in a state of blaming her actions on others. She then meets her solicitor Mrs. Bumble and Bea says they'll make the best of friends, hinting that Mrs. Bumble will be her next obsession.

== Reception ==
For her role as Bea, Ancona was longlisted for "Best Villain" at the 2026 Inside Soap Awards.

Nikki Onafuye from the Daily Mirror speculated that Ancona's casting would send viewers of the soap "into a frenzy". Charlotte Tutton, Onafuye's colleague, described Bea as an "unhinged" character who "enjoys meddling in people's lives". Throughout her tenure, critics have commented on how peculiar Bea is, with Metro nicknaming her "creepy Bea", "Walford's weirdest" and "bonkers Bea", and Digital Spy labelling her "bizarre Bea". Metro initially considered Bea to be "strange yet harmless", but following her credit card fraud, they wrote that she is "insidious" and "anything but harmless", dubbing her "Minute Mart's answer to Fatal Attraction". Digital Spy's Divya Soni also called her a "volatile character". Metro later commented that she had received a polarising response from viewers, with some that loved her and some that loathed her. However, they appreciated that she has "been a source of intrigue" since her debut.

In March 2026, Channel 5 chat show Vanessa began receiving prank calls during its phone-in segment, with callers impersonating various celebrities and fictional characters. The series aired a segment about school reunions, inviting viewers to call and speak about their experiences, to which a viewer called in and impersonated Bea. They used Bea's introduction story as a heavy reference, after which the prank call went viral on X (Twitter).
