= Ronni Ancona =

British actress and comedian (born 1966)

- Born: Veronica Jane Ancona; 4 July 1968 (age 58); Louth, Lincolnshire, England
- Education: Saint Martin's School of Art (BA); University College London (MA)
- Occupations: Actress; impressionist; comedian
- Spouse: Gerard Hall (m. 2004)
- Children: 2

Veronica Jane Ancona (born 4 July 1968) is a British actress, comedian, impressionist, and writer. She co-wrote and starred in The Big Impression, which was, for four years, one of BBC One's top-rated comedy programmes, winning a BAFTA in 2003. She also starred in the first series of the ITV series The Sketch Show, and has appeared in Last Tango in Halifax since its creation in 2012. She is a co-director, alongside Sally Phillips and Nick Hamson, of the production company Captain Dolly. In 2026, she played the role of Bea Pollard in the BBC soap opera, EastEnders.

== Early life ==
Ancona was born in Louth, Lincolnshire, but moved to Scotland when she was a few days old and was raised in Troon. She is of Italian Jewish descent. Her father Derek Ancona was a commander in the Royal Navy and her mother Jane (née Dodworth) was an artist who painted the sets at the Gaiety Theatre in Ayr and the Theatre Royal in Glasgow. Ancona is the youngest of three children with two older brothers, one of whom retired as a Royal Navy rear admiral. In the BBC television programme Comedy Map of Britain she returned to her old school, Marr College in Troon, and talked about her earliest comedy performing experience as part of an improvisation group called Pots People.

She attended the University of Kent at Canterbury to study film and then changed to do a degree in theatre and TV design at Saint Martin's School of Art. At the age of 19, while she was studying at St Martin's College, the BBC's Blue Peter reported on a play about Brecht at the Riverside Studios in which she was involved as a designer and performer. Her appearance was later covered on the BBC show Before They Were Famous. She then attended the Institute of Education, University College London and qualified as a teacher in design and technology. While working as a teacher, she started a comedy career on the live circuit. She won the Time Out Hackney Empire New Act of the Year in 1993.

== Career ==
=== 1992–2005: Early work and The Big Impression ===
Ancona's first Edinburgh Festival appearance was in 1992, during which she performed in two shows: The Inexplicable World of Lionel Nimrod with Stewart Lee and Richard Herring, and a stand-up show with Alistair McGowan. Her first theatre role was in Miss Conceptions in 1996, a comedy play she co-wrote with Alan Francis, directed by Anthony Nielson.

Ancona worked in radio and appeared on television shows such as Fist of Fun, as well as performing stand-up comedy. She co-wrote and performed in the shows Comedy Nation, Pulp Video, and The Sketch Show alongside Lee Mack. Her first feature film role was in 1999 when she appeared in The Debt Collector alongside Billy Connolly. In 2000, she teamed up with Alistair McGowan, with whom she had previously worked on The Staggering Stories of Ferdinand De Bargos and Standing Room Only, to create The Big Impression. The show was one of BBC One's top-rating comedy programmes during its run between 1999 and 2003, and won both a Variety Club Comedy Award and a BAFTA. In 2003, she won "Best Actress" at the British Comedy Awards. From 1996 to 2000, she also voiced Pennyghent on the CITV children's comedy series "Roger and the Rottentrolls". In 2003, she starred in the BBC One historical drama The Key.

In 2004, Ancona was cast in Singin' in the Rain, the first production with Adam Cooper. She played Lina Lamont, the silent-movie starlet, in the Sadler's Wells production. The same year, she played Pat Connelly in The Calcium Kid. In 2005, she played Barbara in Stephen Poliakoff's Gideon's Daughter on BBC One. She also appeared in Stella Street: The Movie, playing numerous female celebrities including Madonna and Victoria Beckham. In 2005, Ancona played Anita in Michael Winterbottom's A Cock and Bull Story. She then played the gold-digging temptress Belline in Richard Bean's 2005 production of Molière's The Hypochondriac, alongside Carey Mulligan and Henry Goodman. The play received favourable reviews, with Michael Billington for The Guardian giving it four stars out of five and describing it as a "hilarious new version".

=== 2006–present: Stage and screen work ===
Ancona has appeared several times on the BBC celebrity panel show QI. In November 2006, she was a guest presenter on Have I Got News for You. She also appeared on the Channel 4 comedy show TV Heaven, Telly Hell discussing her preferences in television shows.

She had a cameo role in the 2006 fantasy romantic comedy Penelope. In 2007, her three-episode comedy sketch series Ronni Ancona & Co was broadcast on BBC One.

In 2009, A Matter of Life and Death: How to Wean a Man Off Football, by Ancona and Alistair McGowan, was published by Faber & Faber. She appeared as the mother of Katie and Emily Fitch in the third (2009) and fourth (2010) series of Skins. In 2009, she had a leading role in the BBC comedy drama Hope Springs. As part of the BBC's The Big Read, she promoted The Lion, the Witch and the Wardrobe. In April 2010, she appeared on A Comedy Roast, celebrating Sharon Osbourne's life. She appeared on the 2010 Strictly Come Dancing Christmas Special where she was paired with Anton Du Beke.

Ancona also took part in Comic Relief's Desert Trek 2011 alongside Craig David, Olly Murs, Dermot O'Leary, Scott Mills and Lorraine Kelly. In 2012, she appeared in Last Tango in Halifax. In 2013, she was cast as Mrs Spencer in The Devil Went Down to Islington, a horror film following two hapless Londoners who sell their souls to Satan. She played Donna, Rob Brydon's agent, in the 2014 film The Trip to Italy. Ancona returned to the Almeida to perform in Little Revolution, set during and after the 2011 London riots, alongside Lucian Msamati and Imogen Stubbs.

In January 2015, she was a guest on Room 101. In June 2015, she was cast to play Paula in the musical adaptation of Bend It Like Beckham at the West End's Phoenix Theatre. However, she had to pull out of the play for personal reasons before the premier. Later that year she appeared alongside Justin Fletcher in The Tale of Mr Tumble during the Manchester International Festival. In 2016, she played Mrs Fletcher, the manager of a local care home, in the seventh series of the Scottish comedy Still Game. Later that year she made a guest appearance in an episode of the BBC television series Celebrity Antiques Road Trip, partnering with antiques expert James Braxton. In April 2017, she appeared as a guest on ITV's The Nightly Show, presented by Jason Manford, in which they each performed impersonations of famous people which the other had to identify.

In 2018, Ancona had a small role in the US comedy film Show Dogs and starred in Surviving Christmas with the Relatives. In 2019, she performed in the Edinburgh Fringe show Just Checking In, which she co-wrote with Kim Fuller and fellow cast member Lewis MacLeod. In December 2020, she appeared as a contestant on the Christmas special of Who Wants to Be a Millionaire? Celebrity Special. She won Pointless Celebrities in January 2021 with Jan Ravens.

In January 2026, Ancona joined the cast of the BBC soap opera EastEnders as Bea Pollard. Her character was introduced as an old classmate of Linda Carter (Kellie Bright), and subsequently befriends Honey Mitchell (Emma Barton). In the same year she appeared in Melt It! The Film of the Iceman alongside Stewart Lee, Jo Brand and The Iceman.

== Personal life ==
Ancona had a seven-year relationship with Alistair McGowan, which ended shortly before they started working together professionally. Ancona is married to Gerard Hall, a consultant rheumatologist with whom she has two daughters. They live in west London. Ancona suffered a stillbirth in 2007.

Ancona is an ambassador to the Environmental Investigation Agency, Marie Curie and Sightsavers.

== Filmography ==
=== Film ===
Key
†	Denotes films that have not yet been released

Year	Title	Role	Notes
1999	The Debt Collector	Miss Dryden	Channel 4 Films
2003	The Early Days	Leela	Short film
2004	Stella Street: The Movie	Various roles	Absolutely Productions
2004	The Calcium Kid	Pat Connelly	Calcium Films Ltd.
2005	A Cock and Bull Story	Anita	Dir.: Michael Winterbottom
2006	Penelope	Wanda	Dir.: Mark Polansky
2010	Huge	Herself	Dir.: Ben Miller
2014	The Trip to Italy	Donna	BBC Films
2015	The Marriage of Reason & Squalor	Hen 3	Dir.: Jake Chapman
2016	The Prince of Denmark	Gertrude	Short film
2018	Show Dogs	Poopsie Chow's Owner	Open Road Films
2018	Stuffed	Gwen	Short film
2018	Surviving Christmas with the Relatives	Vicky	Studio Soho Films
2023	The Devil Went Down to Islington	Mrs. Spencer	Skinned Productions
2026	Think of England	Agnes Duprée	Giant Films
2026	Fortitude †	TBA †	Post-production

=== Television ===
Year	Title	Role	Notes
1994	Ben Elton: The Man from Auntie	Consumer Watch presenter / Tomorrow's World presenter	Series 2, Episode 3
1994	The Imaginatively Titled Punt and Dennis Show		Series 1, Episodes 4–6
1995	What's Up Doc?	Leticia Geek	Series 3, Episode 25
1995	The Geeks		Series 1, Episode 1: "The Money, Money, Money" & Episode 6: "Our House"
1995	Scratchy & Co.	Various	CITV series
1995	Pulp Video	Various characters	BBC Two series
1995	The Staggering Stories of Ferdinand de Bargos	Various (voice)	Series 5, Episodes 1–6
1995–1996	Fist of Fun	Sarah / Tina Hartiman / Various	Series 1, Episodes 3 & 4; Series 2, Episodes 1, 3 & 4
1996	Win, Lose or Draw!	Herself – Contestant	Series 7, Episodes 21–25
1997	Klinik!	Various characters (voice)	Channel 4 series
1997–2000	Roger and the Rottentrolls	Rottentroll Voices (voice)	Series 2–4, 26 episodes
1998	Comedy Nation	Various roles	BBC Two series
1999	Mark Lamarr Leaving the 20th Century		Series 1, Episode 2
1999	The Waiting Time	RMP Colonel	Television film
1999–2003	The Big Impression	Various characters	Series 1–4 & Christmas Specials, 30 episodes
2000	Holby City	Anna Griffiths	Series 3, Episode 7: "The Trouble with the Truth"
2001	Dr. Terrible's House of Horrible	Countess Kronsteen	Series 1, Episode 1: "Lesbian Vampire Lovers of Lust"
2001	Combat Sheep	Peaches (voice)	Television film
2001	The Sketch Show	Various characters	Series 1, Episodes 1–8
2002	Sport Relief	Herself / Victoria Beckham	Television Special
2003	Comic Relief 2003: The Big Hair Do	Various characters	Television Special
2003	The Key	Maggie	Series 1, Episodes 1–3
2004	Who Wants to Be a Millionaire?	Herself – Contestant	Series 16, Episodes 14/15: "Celebrity Special"
2005	Monkey Trousers	Various characters	Series 1, Episodes 1–5
2005	Gideon's Daughter	Barbara	Television film
2005	Comic Relief: Red Nose Night Live '05	Catherine Zeta-Jones / Courtney Cox Arquette / Renée Zellweger	Television Special
2006	Rob Brydon's Annually Retentive	Herself	Series 1, Episode 4
2006	Have I Got News For You	Herself – Guest Presenter	Series 32, Episode 6
2006	The Secret Policeman's Ball: The Ball in the Hall	Herself	Television film
2006–2017	QI	Herself – Panellist	Series 4, 6–9, 12 & 14, 7 episodes
2007	Hotel Babylon	Theresa Evan	Series 2, Episode 1
2007	Agatha Christie's Marple	Amanda Dalrymple	Series 3, Episode 4: "Nemesis"
2007	Comic Relief 2007: The Big One	Various characters	Television Special
2007	Ronni Ancona & Co.	Various roles	Series 1, Episodes 1–3
2008	Comedy Classics	Narrator (voice)	Series 1, Episodes 1–6
2009	Hope Springs	Ann Marie Cairncross	Series 1, Episodes 1–8
2009	CBeebies Bedtime Stories	Herself – Storyteller	Series 1, Episodes 72–76
2009	Would I Lie to You?	Herself – Panellist	Series 3, Episode 7
2009–2010	Skins	Jenna Fitch	Series 3, Episode 9; Series 4, Episodes 2 & 4
2010	Strictly Come Dancing	Herself – Contestant	Series 8, Episode 27: "Christmas Special"
2011	Midsomer Murders	Kitty Pottinger	Series 13, Episode 8: "Fit for Murder"
2011	The Comic Strip Presents...	Barbara Windsor	Series 9, Episode 1: "The Hunt for Tony Blair"
2011	Pet Squad	Various (voices)	Series 1, 52 episodes
2011	Shooting Stars	Herself – Panellist	Series 8, Episode 5
2012	Little Crackers	Ex-Wife	Series 3, Episode 3: "Tommy Tiernan's Little Cracker: Howler"
2012–2020	Last Tango in Halifax	Judith	Series 1, 2, 4 & 5, 15 episodes
2014	The Trip	Donna	Series 2, Episodes 2–6
2014	Pointless Celebrities	Herself – Contestant	Series 6, Episode 12: "Comedy Performers" & Episode 30: "Comedians"
2014	Portrait Artist of the Year	Herself – Sitter	Series 2, Episode 2: "Julian Fellowes, Ronni Ancona, and Helen Kennedy"
2015	Father Brown	Madame Chania	Series 3, Episode 8: "The Lair of the Libertines"
2015	CBeebies Presents: The Tale of Mr Tumble	Miss Eerie	Television film
2015	Citizen Khan	Sandra	Series 4 Episode 4: "Chicken Shop"
2015	Room 101	Herself – Guest	Series 15, Episode 1: "Tim Vine, Len Goodman, Ronni Ancona"
2016	Stella	Selina Child	Series 5, Episode 10
2016	Doctors	Alicia Largo	Series 18, Episode 10: "In Questa Reggia"
2016	Still Game	Mrs. Fletcher	Series 7, Episode 6: "Down and Out"
2016	Pointless Celebrities	Herself – Contestant	Series 10, Episode 6: "Impressionists"
2017	Where in the World	Narrator (voice)	CBeebies documentary series. Series 1, Episodes 1–20
2018	The Week That Wasn't		Sky One series
2018	Tourist Trap	Marie	Series 1, Episode 5
2020	Celebrity Chase	Herself – Contestant	Series 10, Episode 5
2020	Who Wants to Be a Millionaire?	Herself – Contestant	Series 35, Episodes 7: "Christmas Special"
2020	Pointless Celebrities	Herself – Contestant	Series 13, Episode 24: "Impressionists"
2021	Richard Osman's House of Games	Herself – Contestant	Series 4, Episodes 86–90
2022	The Hit List	Herself – Contestant	Series 5, Episode 10: "Christmas Special"
2022	Portrait Artist of the Year	Herself – Contestant	Series 10, Episode: "Celebrity Special"
2022	Friday Night Live	Olivia Colman	Television Special
2024	Death in Paradise	Lexi 'Alexandria' Reece	Series 13, Episode 6
2025	Shakespeare & Hathaway: Private Investigators	Olivia Bluebell	Series 5, Episode 3: "Destruction, Blood and Massacre"
2026	EastEnders	Bea Pollard	Regular role

=== Radio ===
Title	Channel
Life, Death & Sex with Mike & Sue	Radio 4
The Alan Davies Show	Radio 4
Weekending	Radio 4
The Museum of Curiosity	Radio 4
Mum's on the Run	Radio 4
Shed Town	Radio 4
The Game's Up	Radio 5
Loose Ends	Radio 4
Wild Things	Radio 4
Hal	Radio 4
And This is Them	Radio 2
Griff Rhys Jones Show	Radio 4
Gaby's Talking Pictures	Radio 4

=== Theatre ===
Year	Title	Role	Venue
1996	Miss Conceptions		Edinburgh Festival
2004	Singin' in the Rain	Lina Lamont	Sadler's Wells Theatre, London
2005	The Hypochondriac	Belline	Almeida Theatre, London
2014	Little Revolution	Jane / various	Almeida Theatre
2015	The Tale of Mr Tumble	Unsmiling Principle	Manchester Opera House
2016	Carry On Chilcot		Duke of Wales Theatre, London
2019	Just Checking In		Edinburgh Fringe

== Writer ==
Title
The Week That Wasn't
Ronni Ancona & Co
The Sketch Show
Kelsey Grammer Presents: The Sketch Show
The Big Impression
Pulp Video
Comedy Nation
Monkey Trousers
Standing Room Only
Miss Conceptions
Just Checking In

== Producer ==
Title
Posh & Becks' Big Impression: Behind the Scenes & Extra Bits

== Awards and nominations ==
Ancona co-wrote The Big Impression, which won numerous awards including a BAFTA in 2003. She was nominated for Best Comedy Newcomer in 2000 and Best Comedy actress in 2002, as well as winning The Best TV comedy Actress in 2003. Ancona and McGowan also received The Variety Club Comedy Award in 2002.

Year	Ceremony	Award	Work	Result	Ref.
2000	British Comedy Awards	Best Comedy Newcomer	The Big Impression	Nominated	
2001	Broadcast Awards	Best New Programme	The Sketch Show	Won	
2002	Variety Club Showbiz Awards	Comedy Award (with Alistair McGowan)	—N/a	Won	
2002	Television and Radio Industries Club	New TV Talent of the Year	—N/a	Won	
2002	Maxim Women of the Year Awards	Comedy Actress	—N/a	Won	
2002	British Comedy Awards	Best Comedy Actress	The Big Impression	Nominated	
2003	British Comedy Awards	Best Comedy Actress	The Big Impression	Won	
2003	British Academy Television Awards	Best Comedy	The Big Impression	Won	
2004	Glamour Women of the Year Awards	Funny Woman of the Year	—N/a	Won	

== Bibliography ==
- "Ronni Ancona". Guide to Comedy. BBC. Archived from the original on 6 July 2007.
