= You Cannot Be Serious! (TV series) =

- Genre: Sports comedy
- Written by: Alistair McGowan
- Directed by: Paul Wheeler
- Presented by: Alistair McGowan
- Country of origin: United Kingdom
- Original language: English
- No. of series: 1
- No. of episodes: 6

Production
- Executive producers: Harry Hill; Richard Allen-Turner; Jon Thoday
- Producer: Colin Hopkins
- Production locations: BBC Television Centre, London
- Editor: Steven Nayler
- Running time: 30 minutes (inc. adverts)
- Production company: Avalon Television

Original release
- Network: ITV
- Release: 2 June – 7 July 2012

Related
- Harry Hill's TV Burp

You Cannot Be Serious! is a British comedy satire show that aired on ITV from 2 June to 7 July 2012 and was hosted by Alistair McGowan.

== Premise ==
The premise of the show is that McGowan mixes the funniest, quirkiest, and silliest clips from the week's televised sport.

== Episodes ==
No.	Directed by	Original release date
1	Paul Wheeler	2 June 2012
2	Paul Wheeler	9 June 2012
3	Paul Wheeler	16 June 2012
4	Paul Wheeler	23 June 2012
5	Paul Wheeler	30 June 2012
6	Paul Wheeler	7 July 2012
