= The Big Impression =

British comedy sketch TV series

- Title card from series 1
- Also known as: Alistair McGowan's Big Impression
- Genre: Comedy
- Created by: Alistair McGowan; Ronni Ancona
- Directed by: Michael Cumming (S.1)
- Starring: Alistair McGowan; Ronni Ancona
- Country of origin: United Kingdom
- Original language: English
- No. of series: 4
- No. of episodes: 31

Production
- Executive producer: Jon Plowman
- Producer: Charlie Hanson
- Running time: 30 minutes
- Production company: Vera Productions

Original release
- Network: BBC One
- Release: 2 September 1999 – 10 June 2004

The Big Impression, known as Alistair McGowan's Big Impression for the first three series, is a British comedy sketch show. It features Alistair McGowan and Ronni Ancona impersonating personalities from entertainment and sport. Four series and a number of specials were made by Vera Productions and it was first broadcast on BBC One between 1999 and 2004.

The series has won five awards, including the BAFTA TV Award for Best Comedy Programme or Series in 2003.

== Production ==
McGowan and Ancona first met at a comedy club, and later started dating. They worked together on a number of projects, with their first television series being The Staggering Stories of Ferdinand de Bargos in 1989. After performing in his own show in Edinburgh in 1998, McGowan was approached by a BBC executive about working on a series, which he wanted Ancona to be involved in. Alistair McGowan's Big Impression first aired as a pilot on BBC One in 1999, running to a full series in 2000, with the couple splitting up just before filming began. Speaking with The Independent, Ancona said working on the series was "exciting but it was tricky and there were some very low points. [...] But, if anything, the tension added a little frisson to some of the sketches and it made the show better."

Starting with the Christmas special in 2002, McGowan's name was dropped from the show's title.

== Impressions ==
=== Alistair McGowan ===
There have been many characters that Alistair McGowan and Ronni Ancona have impersonated. Some celebrities that McGowan has done impressions of include:

- Charles, Prince of Wales
- Lawrence Llewelyn-Bowen
- Richard Madeley
- David Beckham
- Michael Parkinson
- Robert Kilroy Silk
- Angus Deayton
- Jonathan Ross
- Huw Edwards
- Gary Lineker
- Robert Winston
- Sven-Göran Eriksson
- Alan Davies (As Jonathan from Jonathan Creek)
- Craig Cash (As Dave Best from The Royle Family)
- Michael Douglas
- Alan Titchmarsh
- Tony Blair
- June Brown (As Dot Branning from EastEnders and a version of Albert Steptoe in spoof "Cotton & Son")
- John Altman (As Nick Cotton from EastEnders with the voice of Harold Steptoe in spoof "Cotton & Son")
- Cary Grant
- Terry Wogan
- Trinny Woodall
- Billy Connolly
- Griff Rhys Jones
- Leonard Rossiter
- Kevin Keegan
- Nicky Campbell
- Jeremy Clarkson
- Brian May
- Frank Butcher

=== Ronni Ancona ===
Some celebrities that Ancona has done impressions of include:

- Judy Finnigan
- Carol Smillie
- Victoria Beckham
- Ruby Wax
- Barbara Windsor (As Peggy Mitchell from EastEnders)
- Caroline Aherne (As Denise Best/Royle from The Royle Family)
- Catherine Zeta-Jones
- Camilla, Duchess of Cornwall
- Davina McCall
- Christine Hamilton
- Nigella Lawson
- Audrey Hepburn
- Jennie Bond
- Jerry Hall
- Charlie Dimmock
- Jessie Wallace (As Kat Slater from EastEnders)
- Lorraine Kelly
- Nancy Dell'Olio
- Susannah Constantine
- Sharon Osbourne
- Penélope Cruz

== Episodes ==
A pilot and four series of the programme were made between 1999 and 2003.

Series	Episodes	Dates
Pilot	1	2 September 1999
1	6	26 April 2000 – 25 May 2000
2	6	22 April 2001 – 3 June 2001
3	6	19 April 2002 – 24 May 2002
4	6	9 May 2003 – 13 June 2003

=== Special episodes ===
There have also been a number of one-off specials, including:

- Alistair McGowan's 2000 Impressions (30 December 2000)
- Alistair McGowan's Big 'Enders (10 August 2001)
- The Big Impression Christmas Special (25 December 2001)
- Alistair McGowan's Big World Cup (31 May 2002)
- Alistair McGowan's Big Jubilee (2 June 2002)
- The Big Impression Christmas Special (25 December 2002)
- Posh & Becks' Big Impression (25 December 2003)
- The Big Impression Euro 2004 Special (10 June 2004)

== Awards ==
The series has been nominated for a number of awards, winning one from BAFTA, two from the Royal Television Society, and two British Comedy Awards.

Year	Award	Result	Category
2000	British Comedy Awards	Won	Best Comedy Entertainment Programme
2000	British Comedy Awards	Nominated	Best Comedy Newcomer (Ronni Ancona)
2000	British Comedy Awards	Nominated	Best New Television Comedy
2000	Royal Television Society Craft & Design Awards	Won	Best Make Up Design – Entertainment & Non-Drama (Heather Squire)
2002	British Comedy Awards	Nominated	Best Comedy Actress (Ronni Ancona)
2002	National Television Awards	Nominated	Most Popular Comedy Performance (Alistair McGowan)
2002	Royal Television Society Programme Awards	Won	Entertainment Performance (Alistair McGowan)
2002	Royal Television Society Craft & Design Awards	Nominated	Best Costume Design – Entertainment & Non-Drama Productions (Kate O'Farrell)
2002	Royal Television Society Craft & Design Awards	Nominated	Best Make Up Design – Entertainment & Non-Drama Productions (Eva Marieges Moore)
2002	Royal Television Society Craft & Design Awards	Nominated	Best Production Design – Entertainment & Non-Drama Productions (Harry Banks)
2002	Royal Television Society Craft & Design Awards	Nominated	Best Tape and Film Editing – Entertainment & Situation Comedy (Richard Halladay)
2002	Royal Television Society Craft & Design Awards	Nominated	Team Award (Production Team, series C)
2003	British Academy Television Awards	Won	Best Comedy Programme or Series
2003	British Academy Television Craft Awards	Nominated	Best Make Up & Hair Design (Eva Marieges-Moore)
2003	British Comedy Awards	Won	Best Television Comedy Actress (Ronni Ancona)
2003	National Television Awards	Nominated	Most Popular Comedy Performance (Alistair McGowan)
