= Alistair McGowan =

English comedian and actor (born 1964)

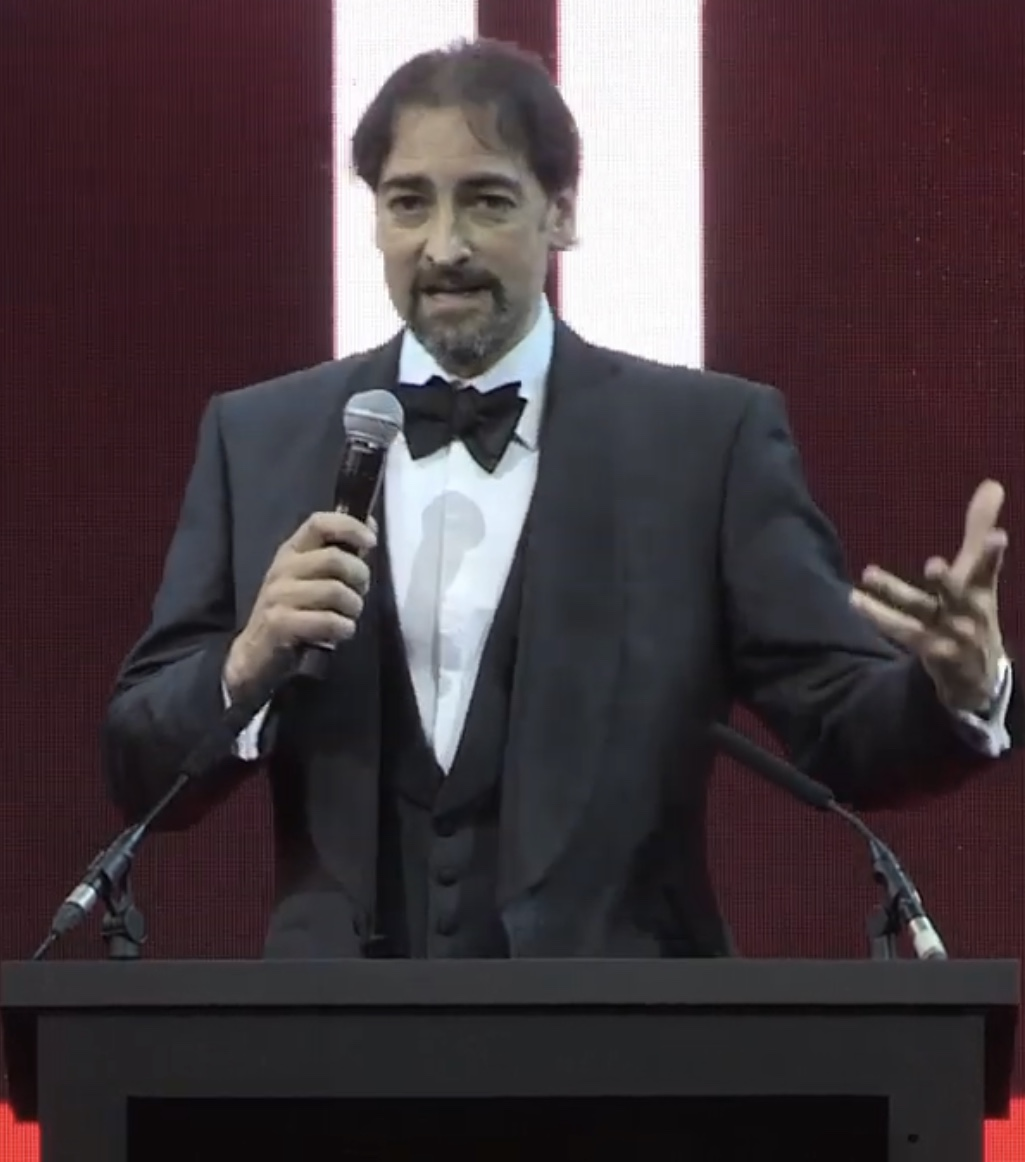
- McGowan hosting the 6th Asian Awards in 2016
- Born: Alistair Charles McGowan; 24 November 1964 (age 61); Evesham, Worcestershire, England
- Occupations: Impressionist, comic, actor, pianist, poet, writer
- Notable work: The Big Impression; The Piano Album; Not What We Were Expecting
- Spouse: Charlotte Page (m. 2013)

Comedy career
- Years active: 1980s–present
- Medium: Television, radio, stand-up, piano, and poetry
- Genres: Impressions, sketch comedy
- Website: Official website

Alistair Charles McGowan (born 24 November 1964) is an English impressionist, comic, actor, pianist, poet, and writer. He starred in The Big Impression (formerly Alistair McGowan's Big Impression). He has also worked in theatre and appeared in the West End (for which he received a Laurence Olivier Award nomination in 2008). He also provided voices for the original Spitting Image.

In 2017, he released an album of classical piano music called The Piano Album. In 2024, he published his poetry collection named Not What We Were Expecting.

In 2012, McGowan hosted the ITV comedy series You Cannot Be Serious!, in which his impressions included Roy Hodgson, Jedward, Harry Hill, and David Beckham.

He has written and starred in three plays for BBC Radio 4 about Erik Satie (Three Pieces in the Shape of a Pear), John Field (The Peregrinations of a Most Musical Irishman) and George Bernard Shaw (The 'B' Word). He devised stage shows showcasing the music and verse of Noël Coward (Sincerely Noel), and the music and writings of Erik Satie (Erik Satie's-faction). He also wrote the stage play Timing.

== Early life ==
McGowan was born in Evesham, Worcestershire, in 1964, to his mother Marian, a talented pianist, and his father George, a school-teacher who was born in India. He studied English at the University of Leeds, later attending the Guildhall School of Music and Drama, graduating in 1989. He went straight into comedy, performing live at The Comedy Store and the Edinburgh Festival Fringe.

== Career ==
McGowan's television career began when he performed some of the voices for the ITV television series Spitting Image. Later he took over from Stephen Tompkinson playing Spock in the Tim Firth comedy drama, Preston Front.

From 2 June to 7 July 2012, McGowan hosted and wrote for the ITV1 comedy series, You Cannot Be Serious!, Impressions include England manager Roy Hodgson, television presenter Harry Hill, Eurovision duo Jedward, and footballer David Beckham.

McGowan is patron of the Ludlow Fringe Festival, where he first performed live in 2013. At the town's St Laurence's Church during the 2021 festival, he performed The Piano Show combining classical pieces played on a Steinway Grand Piano with stand-up comedy and impressions.

=== The Big Impression ===
McGowan starred in the TV show The Big Impression, formerly Alistair McGowan's Big Impression, with Ronni Ancona. His celebrity impressions include David Beckham, Sven-Göran Eriksson, Gary Lineker, Nicky Campbell, Richard Madeley, Tony Blair, Prince Charles, Robert Kilroy-Silk, Laurence Llewelyn-Bowen, Angus Deayton, Terry Wogan and the fictional characters Ross Geller (from Friends) and Dot Cotton (from EastEnders). McGowan and Ancona impersonated Posh and Becks, with McGowan as David Beckham and Ancona in the role of Victoria Beckham.

=== Return to acting and radio work (2005) ===
He made a return to dramatic acting in 2005, appearing in the BBC's adaptation of Charles Dickens's novel Bleak House. In 2006, he starred in the detective series Mayo. He also presented an episode of Have I Got News for You on 20 October 2006. He has re-voiced video footage of BBC Sports Personality of the Year and Match of the Day.

In 2008 he made his directing debut at Guildhall School of Music and Drama (where he studied) with Noël Coward's classic comedy Semi-Monde. In March 2009, McGowan starred as the Duke in the stage version of Shakespeare's Measure for Measure.

In 2010 McGowan appeared as a host on one episode of the fifth series of Live at the Apollo (2010). In 2011 he appeared playing Nick's coach in the fifth episode of Skins (2011), On 12 March 2011, he played the part of the Pirate King in Gilbert and Sullivan's The Pirates of Penzance, at the Barbican Centre, London. Also in 2011, he co-starred as Piero di Cosimo de' Medici in season one of the CBBC series Leonardo.

In 2013 McGowan embarked on a fifty-date stand-up tour in his show Not Just A Pretty Voice. He also took part, with Eddie Izzard, in the first ever stand-up show performed by two English comics totally in French in Sheffield. In 2014 he teamed up with comedian Jasper Carrott to present comedy shows where they shared 50% of the show with comedy stand up routines and impressions; They performed at over 100 shows together.

From 10 June to 11 July 2015, McGowan starred as Jimmy Savile in An Audience with Jimmy Savile, a play written by Jonathan Maitland, at the Park Theatre in London. McGowan was praised for his performance. The show was transferred to the Edinburgh Festival Fringe in August. He made another cameo as Savile in the film Creation Stories about Creation Records owner Alan McGee.

In 2018 McGowan was a voice-artist, writer, and producer on the topical re-voicing show The Week That Wasn't on Sky One.In 2022 he narrated the documentary film My Name is Alfred Hitchcock as Alfred Hitchcock.

== Music ==
In 2013 McGowan explained in a piece for The Guardian that he had "... hero-worshipped the French composer Erik Satie for many years. Not only was he a hugely innovative and visionary composer – but he was also a man with a passion for all forms of art." In 2014 McGowan narrated, in the guise of Satie, a concert of surrealist ballet music from Paris in the 1920s, given by the BBC Concert Orchestra at the Queen Elizabeth Hall in London and broadcast live by BBC Radio 3. In 2017 he released a debut album on Sony Classical featuring piano performances of classical music. Having previously had a very limited repertoire, McGowan practised intensively for nine months to complete the recording.

== Environmental work ==
In 2004 he launched 'the BIG recycle' national recycling campaign.

In January 2009 it was announced that McGowan in partnership with three other Greenpeace activists, including actress Emma Thompson, had bought land near Sipson, Middlesex, a village under threat from the proposed third runway for Heathrow Airport. The activists expressed the hope that the area of ground, half the size of a football pitch, will prevent the government from carrying through its plan to expand Heathrow. The field, bought for an undisclosed sum from a local land owner, will be split into small squares and sold across the globe. McGowan said: "BAA were so confident of getting the Government's go ahead, but we have cunningly bought the land they need to build their runway."

In June 2011 it was announced that McGowan had become a Patron of the Friends of Brandwood End Cemetery, where over 30 members of his extended family are interred.

== Other work ==
- In October 2009, A Matter of Life and Death: How to Wean a Man Off Football, by McGowan and former comedy partner Ronni Ancona, was published by Faber & Faber.
- Alistair's first poetry collection, Not What We Were Expecting, was published in 2024 by Flapjack Press.

== Awards ==
For The Big Impression (formerly Alistair McGowan's Big Impression), he received the Best Comedy Entertainment Award at the British Comedy Awards in 2000, Best Entertainment Programme at the Broadcast Awards the following year, and the Variety Club Comedy Award a year later.

He has also worked in theatre and appeared in the West End, for which he received a Laurence Olivier Award nomination in 2008.

He wrote the stage play Timing which was nominated as Best New Comedy at the 2009 whatsonstage.com awards.

== Personal life ==
McGowan was in a relationship for seven years with fellow television comedian Ronni Ancona. In August 2013 McGowan married his girlfriend Charlotte Page alongside whom he had performed in The Mikado.

McGowan is a supporter of Leeds United and Coventry City, the team closest to the area where he spent his late teens. He stated that he decided to study at Leeds partly because of its proximity to Elland Road. His interest in football forms the basis of his 2009 book A Matter of Life and Death.

Since 2020 McGowan has lived in Ludlow, Shropshire.

McGowan always assumed his family was Scottish. However, records revealed that the first McGowan in the line, John McGowan, had actually sailed to India from Ireland as a private soldier and steadily rose to the rank of Major.
