= Trinny and Susannah =

British fashion advisors and TV presenters

Trinny Woodall and Susannah Constantine
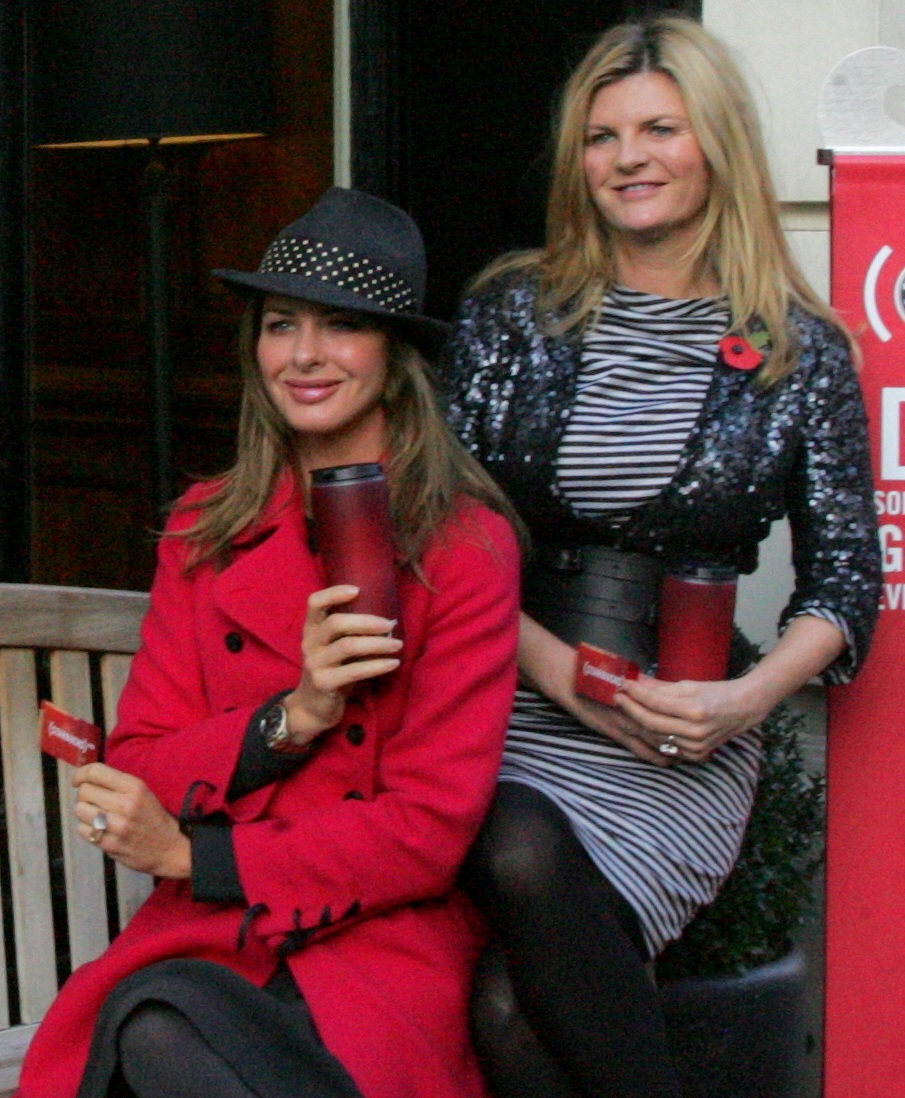
- Trinny Woodall (left) and Susannah Constantine (right)
- Born: London, England
- Occupation: Fashion journalists
- Website: http://www.trinnyandsusannah.com

Trinny Woodall and Susannah Constantine are two British fashion advisors, presenters and authors. They originally joined to write a weekly style column in The Daily Telegraph which lasted for seven years, but they are best known for presenting the BBC television series What Not to Wear for five series and then Trinny & Susannah Undress... on ITV. They have written several fashion advice books which have become bestsellers in Britain and America, and released their own clothing and underwear ranges. Trinny and Susannah have also appeared on The Oprah Winfrey Show as makeover experts. Over the course of their career, Woodall and Constantine have dressed over 5,000 women.

== Career ==
=== Early years ===
Trinny Woodall and Susannah Constantine teamed up in 1994 to write Ready to Wear, a weekly style guide for the Daily Telegraph which ran for seven years. They had previously met at a dinner party hosted by David, Viscount Linley but did not actually like each other at first. They both perceived each other in negative ways: Woodall looked upon Constantine as if she was a stuck-up English aristocrat and Constantine saw Woodall as 'Eurotrash'.

They later became the co-founders of Ready2shop.com, a dot-com fashion advice business which ceased trading after running out of funding in November 2000, losing investors a reputed £10 million. They later gained their first chance at working on television when Granada Sky Broadcasting signed them up to host a daytime shopping show, also called Ready to Wear. They published their first fashion advice book called Ready 2 Dress but it was an unsuccessful venture and ended in 13,000 copies of the book being destroyed. After a makeover slot on Richard & Judy, Jane Root, the controller of BBC Two, signed them up even after their book Ready to Dress and their internet business Ready2shop.com had failed.

Woodall (left) and Constantine on book cover.

=== 2001–2005: What Not to Wear era ===
After they were signed to BBC Two, they became the hosts and fashion advisors for five series of the BBC style series What Not to Wear in 2001, where they used their knowledge on fashion and harsh comments to reform the appearances and style of the participants on the show. The duo became instantly renowned for their poking and prodding of the contestants, their straight-talking advice, and frequently referring to breasts as tits. The editor of ELLE, Sarah Bailey, has stated "You just don't expect posh girls to grab your tits, call your trousers 'too clitty' and use words like 'pussy pelmet' but they do. You are so shocked by what they are saying that by the time you have recovered and thought of something to say they have whipped you out of your jeans and eased you into a Lycra cat suit." They have stated that their relationship is more like a marriage and that being total opposites, they balance each other out. They cannot imagine working without each other. Woodall and Constantine have been accused of being patronising, but reject these claims.

They gained recognition for their work on the show and won a Royal Television Society Award in 2002 in the category of best factual presenter. They have also given different celebrities makeovers which include Jeremy Clarkson, Lesley Joseph, Jo Brand, Sophie Raworth, and Ingrid Tarrant. Woodall and Constantine became the faces of Nescafé in 2003. After success with the ratings on BBC Two, their programme was promoted to the more mainstream BBC One in 2004.

Together, they have written several successful fashion books, starting with the book What Not to Wear in 2001, which made sales worth £8.7 million. The book which stemmed from their fashion show of the same name, won them a notable British Book Award in 2003 for "The TV & Film Book of the Year" and outsold Jamie Oliver and Nigella Lawson when sale figures reached a total of 670,000 copies. The book sold 300,000 copies in just fifteen weeks and was also selling 45,000 copies a week at one point. They then secured a £1 million book deal to produce three more of their fashion books, compared to the £10,000 advance they received for What Not to Wear. Their books have since become number one bestsellers in Britain and the United States and have been translated throughout the world, selling over 2.5 million copies. The books have also appeared on The Sunday Times bestseller list and The New York Times bestseller list.

Woodall and Constantine appeared frequently as makeover experts on The Oprah Winfrey Show in America where they gave fashion advice and guidelines on how to improve an overall appearance through clothing, often using themselves to illustrate the correct clothing to wear and what not to wear. In 2005, Trinny and Susannah were the contemporary social commentators on the live BBC coverage of The Royal Wedding of Charles and Camilla. They also voiced a robot version of themselves in the science fiction series Doctor Who in the episode "Bad Wolf" in 2005, which saw the gynoids Trine-e and Zu-Zana presenting a deadly futuristic version of What Not to Wear. The robots were prepared to give Captain Jack Harkness a particularly gruesome makeover. Woodall and Constantine have appeared on Parkinson a total of three times, as well as numerous other chat shows.

=== 2006: Undress... era ===
Trinny Woodall and Susannah Constantine both defected from the BBC to ITV and started their new show, Trinny & Susannah Undress..., on 3 October 2006 which was followed by a second series in June 2007. The first two series saw the pair helping couples with marital problems, where they gave them advice and fashion makeovers to try build confidence and ultimately aim to revive the relationships. Critics questioned Woodall and Constantine's capability of dealing with the serious issues they faced on the programme, but they strongly rejected these claims. Since the transfer to ITV, What Not to Wear on BBC One has been hosted by Lisa Butcher and Mica Paris.

When the internet-shopping company, Littlewoods, saw orders rise by thirty per cent during its sponsorship of Trinny & Susannah Undress..., Woodall and Constantine were made the faces of Littlewoods Direct in 2006. The duo have since provided twelve pages of fashion advice within the Littlewoods catalogue, compiled a booklet called The Golden Rules which was distributed to all Littlewoods customers with fashion advice to suit all body shapes. They also compiled online guidelines where customers are able to type-in their body measurements and get instant advice on which Littlewoods clothing is suitable for their figure, and have been featured in television advertisements for Littlewoods Direct. The television advertisements featured them both trying to rob a Littlewoods designer warehouse, but their mission is ruined when Constantine becomes stuck in between the protective bars, prompting Woodall to utter "You and your curves", before they are taken away by security. The 2007 Christmas series of adverts saw them trying to hijack a motored sleigh carrying Littlewoods designer gifts. The £12m television and print campaign featuring Woodall and Constantine is one of largest ever seen for a home shopping and internet-based company. Since the advertisements aired, brand awareness has grown by 13 per cent, whilst total sales have escalated by 18 per cent. The number of visitors to the website has also risen by 56 per cent.

Also in 2006, they launched their own underwear range; "Trinny and Susannah Magic Knickers" which are made of nylon, designed to flatten the tummy and buttocks and thighs so they appear slimmer and compact. On 16 October 2006, they appeared on NBC's The Today Show, giving makeovers to three women and promoted their book, Trinny & Susannah Take on America. In a poll of 3,000 people conducted by Radio Times, they were ranked as the ninth most terrifying celebrities on television, largely due to their use of direct and frank advice.

=== 2007–2009: Undress the Nation era ===
Their latest book to date, The Body Shape Bible, was published on 18 September 2007. Prior to writing The Body Shape Bible, Trinny and Susannah conducted a survey on women that helped them to identify the twelve most common body shapes which they would then feature in their fashion advice book. They gave the shapes different names that include 'apple', 'brick', 'pencil' and 'lollipop'. The new book is aimed to help women decipher what particular shape they are, and then proceeds to give fashion guidelines according to each individual shape. An 'apple' for instance, is classed as a woman who is round but has breasts that are smaller than her stomach as the weight is carried around the middle. They have also donated a few pages to highlight their own fashion faux-pas from the past.

On 20 September 2007, they launched their own exclusive Littlewoods Direct Autumn/Winter women's range which consists of trousers, coats and tops and, like their underwear range, are designed to shrink the buttocks, reduce thighs, flatten tummies or emphasize the waist. Woodall and Constantine designed independently the clothing items, with Littlewoods advising them on pricing and selling. Constantine stated "If you want to create a waist, there's a dress that's going to do that for you too. We've designed it very much around the female body."

Their newly formatted series, Trinny and Susannah Undress the Nation, began to air on ITV in November 2007 and explored the major fashion problems in Britain. The pair returned to America on 5 November and 28 December 2007, where their makeovers on six different shaped women were featured on Good Morning America. The duo also reported on the 80th Academy Awards' red carpet fashion especially for Good Morning America in 2008.

They announced a tour to New Zealand and Australia in 2007, where they made a series of public appearances at shopping malls owned by the Westfield Group in February and March 2008. During the tour, which included visits to Melbourne and Sydney, they performed live styling sessions and gave fashion advice to customers at the Westfield centres. Their appearances at the malls attracted crowds of thousands and the tour finished on 8 March 2008. Woodall and Constantine also appeared on The Morning Show hosted by Kylie Gillies and Larry Emdur, to give one of the viewers a complete makeover. They currently write a weekly column for The Sun in Britain.

In a filmed stunt for their new show, The Great British Body, which was broadcast in June 2008 on ITV, Woodall and Constantine stripped naked with 300 others on a Sussex hillside to create a giant living sculpture. On 31 January 2009, their new show Making over America with Trinny and Susannah, premiered on TLC.

The duo returned again to Australia in March 2009 for a series of appearances at Westfield shopping centres on behalf of the Westfield Group. Similar to their last Australian tour, they gave live styling sessions and gave fashion advise on stages at several Westfield centres from 26 March to 3 April. Their popularity was just as strong as it was in 2007. Before their first appearance on 3 April at Westfield Parramatta in Sydney, Woodall and Constantine returned to appear on Australia's most popular morning variety show The Morning Show giving hosts Kylie Gillies and Larry Emdur styling tips. In one segment, the duo made over an old dress Gillies had bought into the show. The duo decided to give the dress a more plunging neckline, and while ripping the dress down the middle from the neck, Gillies began panicking, thinking they were tearing the entire dress off, making for an embarrassing moment for Gillies while on live television.

=== 2009: Making Over America on TLC ===
Trinny and Susannah have been travelling across the United States to find women who need help getting themselves a fashion makeover. Its first episode aired on TLC on 21 August 2009.

=== 2010: In Belgium ===
For Vitaya they are currently taping a show called Trinny & Susannah: Mission Flanders. The first episode aired on 24 March 2010.

=== 2010: "Trinny and Susannah – What They Did Next" ===
The Guardian reported Trinny and Susannah were in a new online series – produced by Studios – "What Trinny and Susannah Did Next" is a mockumentary – an elaborately knowing spoof – part Alan Partridge, part The Office, part The Thick of It. There's even a touch of Borat."

"The cast consists of professional actors and standup comics, the dialogue is part-scripted, part-ad-libbed, and the overall effect is weirdly postmodern and surprisingly successful. The biggest surprise of all is Trinny and Susannah's acting ability, which is astonishingly convincing, even though, as they cheerfully point out, they're only playing hyperbolised versions of themselves."

Celebrity cameos include Lulu, David Guest, DJ Neil Fox, Vanessa Feltz and The Scissor Sisters.

=== 2011 and 2012: Israel, Poland and Scandinavia ===
Trinny and Susannah were touring Israel in March 2011, doing makeover for 100 participants of the show. The programme is airing on Channel 10. Following the programme's success, its second season is currently airing. (in Hebrew)

In the end of March and the beginning of April 2011 Trinny and Susannah toured across Poland, doing makeover for women and men in the country's four biggest cities. The eight-episode show started airing on 21 April 2011 on TVN Style.

In the beginning of 2011, the team also toured Sweden, visiting seven cities and did makeovers for both men and women in seven episodes. The show is called 'Trinny och Susannah stylar om Sverige' (meaning 'Trinny & Susannah restyle Sweden') - The Show started airing on channel TV4 Plus on 28 March 2011, and they now have a second series on the same channel (now rebranded 'Sjuan') from the beginning of September 2012.

In 2012, Trinny & Susannah toured Norway, where they visited multiple cities. It was the start of season 1 of the TV show called 'Trinny & Susannah - oppdrag Norge'. The first season started airing on channel FEM in Norway in the beginning of 2012. The show became very popular and the third season premiered October 2013. In the latest series Norwegian celebrities are being restyled.

In 2012 shows were made also in Denmark.

=== 2014: Finland and Germany ===
They toured Finland and Germany in 2014.

== Popular culture ==
Woodall and Constantine have been parodied many times on comedy impression programmes. Alistair McGowan's Big Impression took to spoofing their personalities on What Not to Wear, as did 2DTV who made cartoon versions of Woodall and Constantine giving Santa Claus a makeover, where they stripped him of his red suit and added a casual shirt and trousers.

In an episode of the last series of French & Saunders comedy series, Woodall and Constantine were mentioned as being "bullies" in a Celebrity Grading Report sketch where Dawn French was the headmaster of a celebrity school where she had to write comments on various celebrities. Woodall and Constantine were similarly depicted in the comic Viz in a cartoon strip as being bullies that picked on children who wore NHS glasses and second-hand clothing.

In 2006, on Gordon Ramsay's The F-Word, Ramsay named his two pigs Trinny and Susannah after Woodall and Constantine, which the duo found highly amusing.

== Bibliography ==
- Ready 2 Dress: How to Have Style Without Following Fashion, Weidenfeld Nicolson (14 February 2000) (ISBN 0-3043-5425-2)
- What Not to Wear, Weidenfeld Nicolson (5 September 2002) (ISBN 0-2978-4331-1)
- What Not to Wear: The Rules, Weidenfeld Nicolson (1 June 2004) (ISBN 1-8418-8249-6)
- What Not to Wear: For Every Occasion, Weidenfeld Nicolson (1 June 2004) (ISBN 1-8418-8236-4)
- What You Wear Can Change Your Life, Weidenfeld & Nicolson (17 September 2004) (ISBN 0-2978-4356-7)
- What Your Clothes Say About You, Weidenfeld & Nicolson (29 September 2005) (ISBN 0-2978-4357-5)
- Trinny and Susannah: The Survival Guide, Weidenfeld & Nicolson, (20 September 2006) (ISBN 0-2978-4426-1)
- Trinny & Susannah Take on America: What Your Clothes Say about You, HarperCollins Publishers (October 2006) (ISBN 0-0611-3744-8)
- The Body Shape Bible, Weidenfeld & Nicolson (18 September 2007) (ISBN 0-2978-4454-7)

== See also ==
- Trinny Woodall
- Susannah Constantine
