= Princess of Wales Hospital =

- Cwm Taf Morgannwg University Health Board
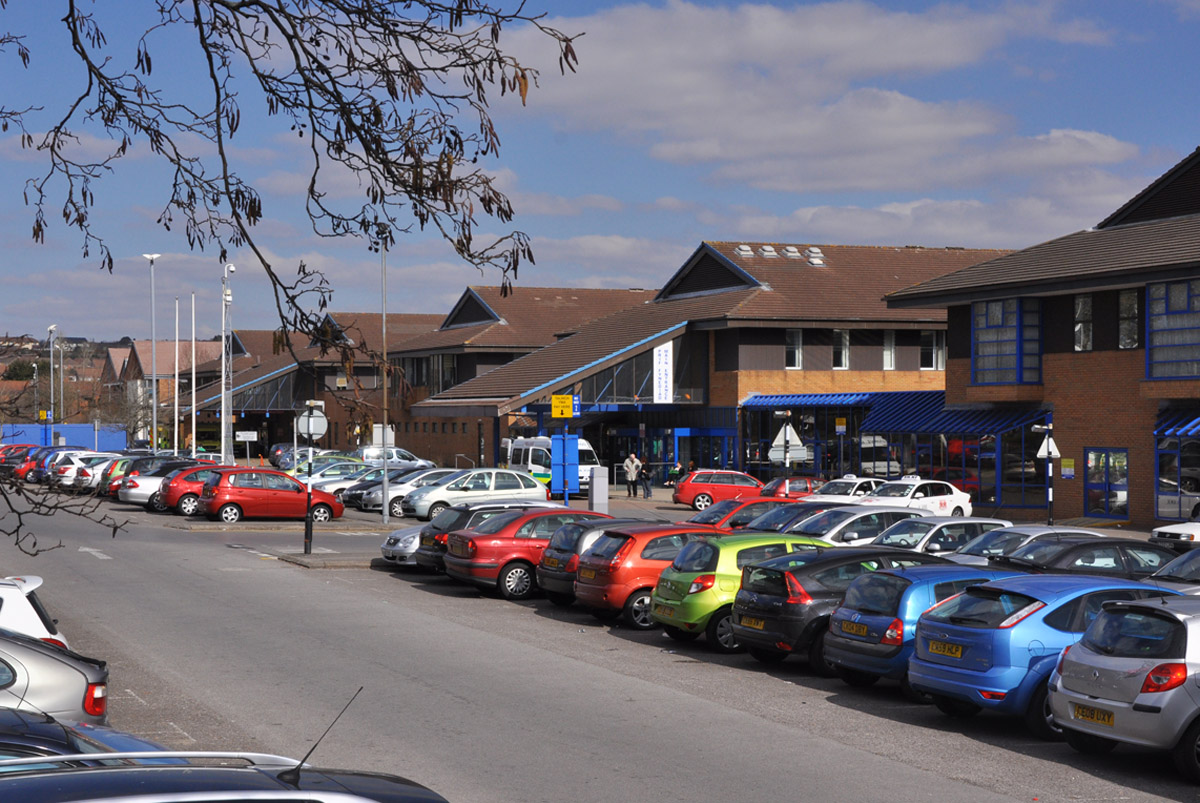
- Princess of Wales Hospital

- Shown in Bridgend County Borough

Geography
- Location: Bridgend, Mid Glamorgan, Wales, United Kingdom
- Coordinates: 51.51743°N 3.57169°W

Organisation
- Care system: NHS Wales
- Type: General
- Affiliated university: No

Services
- Emergency department: Yes Accident & Emergency
- Beds: 466 (2023-4)

History
- Founded: 1985

Links
- Website: cwmtafmorgannwg.wales/visiting/princess-of-wales-hospital/
- Lists: Hospitals in Wales

The Princess of Wales Hospital (Welsh: Ysbyty Tywysoges Cymru) is a district general hospital in Bridgend, Wales. It is managed by Cwm Taf Morgannwg University Health Board.

== History ==
The hospital was commissioned to replace the aging Bridgend General Hospital. The new hospital, which was designed by Holder Mathias, was officially opened by the Princess of Wales on 11 June 1986. The George Thomas Scanner Suite was subsequently opened by the Princess of Wales and Viscount Tonypandy in February 1990.

== Services ==
The Surgical Materials Testing Laboratory, which provides testing and technical services to the Welsh NHS on medical devices, is based at the hospital.

The South Wales Child and Adolescent Mental Health Services unit, Tŷ Llidiard, is on the site of the hospital.

== Performance ==
In May 2014, staff at the hospital was criticised in a report into the death of an elderly patient who had been treated at the hospital; the report found that there had been "variable or poor professional behaviour and practice in the care of frail older people".

The Healthcare Inspectorate Wales carried out a mental health unit review in April 2015 and raised concerns about "insufficient staffing levels to maintain safe levels of care" and "concerns around a specific patient for which there was inadequate recording of fluid intake and a care and treatment plan which did not adequately address the area of diabetes and an absence of any care strategy in relation to this area".

=== Prosecution of nurses scandal ===
Multiple nurses were accused of negligence at the hospital, but prosecutions failed in October 2015 when it was determined that the computer log of patient records was unreliable.

== Uniforms ==
Trinny Woodall and Susannah Constantine re-designed the uniforms of the catering department as part of their ITV show, Trinny & Susannah Undress the Nation. The episode was broadcast on 18 December 2007.

== Radio ==
Bridgend's Hospital Radio (BHR) provides the hospital radio service at the hospital.

The hospital radio is run by volunteers and features a variety of programming. The station is available to be listened live at the Princess of Wales Hospital and via an online stream.
