= Ready for Absolutely Nothing =

2022 memoir by Susannah Constantine

- Author: Susannah Constantine
- Audio read by: Susannah Constantine
- Language: English
- Genre: Memoir
- Publisher: Michael Joseph
- Publication date: 29 September 2022
- Publication place: United Kingdom
- Media type: Print (hardcover), e-book, audiobook
- Pages: 368
- ISBN: 978-0-241-55520-0

Ready for Absolutely Nothing is a 2022 memoir by Susannah Constantine. It recounts her rise to fame as an "It girl" in the 1980s and her later career as a television fashion commentator alongside Trinny Woodall on What Not to Wear. The book includes accounts of her interactions with Princess Diana, David Linley, and her relationship with Imran Khan.

Constantine describes an upbringing that discouraged personal ambition and self-expression, which lead to difficulties in her early adulthood. She outlines her social life and her relationships with public figures. The memoir also addresses her struggles with alcoholism, including an incident in Cornwall that prompted her to seek help through Alcoholics Anonymous.

The book provides insight into British high society and Constantine's experiences within it, and concludes with reflections on her life at age 60, focusing on marriage, motherhood, and sobriety.

== Reception ==
The memoir has been reviewed by The Times, The Guardian, and Daily Telegraph.
