= Trinny & Susannah Undress the Nation =

British fashion television series

- Presented by: Trinny Woodall, Susannah Constantine
- Country of origin: United Kingdom
- No. of series: 2
- No. of episodes: 13

Production
- Producer: ITV Productions
- Running time: 60 minutes (with advertisements)

Original release
- Network: ITV
- Release: 7 November 2007

Trinny & Susannah Undress the Nation is a British reality fashion-themed television documentary series on ITV featuring fashion advisors Trinny Woodall and Susannah Constantine.

The newly formatted series, stemming from Trinny & Susannah Undress..., began to air on ITV on 7 November 2007, and explores some of the major fashion problems in Britain. Numerous eye-catching stunts were filmed for the first series of the show in order to emphasise the points raised by Trinny and Susannah. One stunt included Susannah Constantine being transformed into a 70-year-old to look at how people dress for their age. Breasts, bras and uniforms were also some of the themes investigated during the first series.

== History ==
The first series of Trinny and Susannah Undress the Nation, which consisted of five episodes, started to air on 7 November 2007. The first episode gained high viewing figures of 5.35 million, becoming the most-watched programme in its timeslot. The first episode, which featured breasts and bras, prompted numerous complaints to ITV when scenes of topless women were broadcast before the 9pm watershed. An ITV spokesman commented "The context of this programme fully justified the use of footage of women topless and in bras. The presenters were pursuing a serious subject in an engaging and entertaining way."

"But this series is more campaigning. It is more journalistic, but still hugely entertaining. It's a show we feel more proud of than anything we've done to date."
— Susannah Constantine talking about Trinny & Susannah Undress the Nation.

The new show aims to tackle some of the main fashion problems in Britain, where ITV filmed numerous stunts to be broadcast on the programme to promote Trinny and Susannah's points. Some of the stunts included Susannah being transformed into a 70-year-old to look at how people dress according to their age, and Trinny and Susannah accomplishing a redesign of the supermarket Somerfield's uniform in just two weeks. Somerfield's bosses later decided not to use the newly styled uniform after it had been deemed too impractical. The themes covered during the first series included breasts and bras, men, shape, age and uniforms. Constantine stated "it is putting a microscope on certain areas that affect us all."

The scene filmed for Undress The Nation on 2 July 2007 generated some controversy. The culmination of the programme involved Trinny, Susannah and 100 women giving the East Sussex chalk figure, the Long Man of Wilmington, a temporary female form by adding pigtails, breasts and hips. The women created the effect by lying down in white boiler suits to make different shapes. The hillside chalk carving was not permanently changed or affected. However the scene prompted twenty-two Neo-Pagans to protest at the historical site during filming. The Long Man is claimed as "sacred" by the Council of British Druid Orders, who said the "stunt" would "dishonour an ancient Pagan site of worship". A statement made by ITV stated that they were given permission for the event by Sussex Archaeological Society and that they took "the utmost care ... to protect this historical site". The owners, Sussex Archaeological Society, later apologised for any offence caused to any "individuals or groups" by the filming. An e-petition demanding that the broadcast be stopped attracted 782 signatures.

== International broadcasting ==
Australia on The Lifestyle Channel and The Seven Network

Belgium on Vitaya

Canada on BBC Canada

Ireland on TV3

Israel on HOT3

South Korea on Granada International

New Zealand on TV ONE

Philippines on Lifestyle Network

Poland on TVN Style

South Africa on The Home Channel

Spain on Cosmopolitan

Sweden on Kanal 5

United Kingdom on ITV

== Episode list ==
=== Series one (2007) ===
Breasts and bras – The first episode of Trinny & Susannah Undress the Nation tackles the theme of breasts and bras in Britain where Trinny and Susannah state "British boobs need help!" Trinny and Susannah aim to investigate why many British women wear the wrong size bra and aim to promote wearing the correct size bra, and emphasize the benefits.

The fashion duo take their large pink box around the country in which women reveal their bra fittings for Trinny and Susannah to explore how women's bras generally fit. They have stated that the box "provided a very intimate environment in which women could feel safe and be very honest." In order to investigate how breasts are measured, the two fashionistas go to three leading high-street stores to have their own breasts measured incognito, so as not to get any special treatment. They both leave each store having been given three different breast measurements, implying that women are disillusioned when choosing which size bra. Then, to have an awareness of what it is like to have large breasts, Trinny has fake moulded silicon breasts fitted by prosthetics experts, taking her from a 32A bra size to a 32D for the day. She later walks down the red carpet at the Classical Brit Awards, causing speculation that she had had a "boob job".

Their ultimate stunt is arranging for nearly 1000 women in Rothwell, Northamptonshire to have their bust measured professionally, complemented by receiving free correctly-fitting bras. Trinny, Susannah and the 1000 participants then take off their tops in public, revealing their new bras and ultimately disposing of their old bras in public, emphasizing the importance of wearing the correct bra size. The results find that 976 out of the 1000 women, averaging at about 90%, actually had the wrong size bra.

Men – In the second installment of the series, Trinny and Susannah investiage the fashion issues of men, and ultimately aim to get a nation of well-dressed British men. To start their campaign, Trinny and Susannah attend a dress-down day at a civil engineers where they entice the engineers into their pink box to talk about their outfits. They duo are shocked at the way in which the men dress, with Susannah remarking "You've got amazing coloured eyes but you look like you've just crawled from under a stone." Trinny and Susannah then monitor how men shop via secret cameras. They find that the men they have observed do not actually shop but get taken shopping by their wives.

In order to get into the male psyche, they spend a day at Walthamstow Stadium dog track and subsequently decide to invent six rules of fashion for men based on the way that the betting information is arranged. The six basic body shapes include man boobs, beer belly, short legs, thick neck, broad shoulders and skinny. With each body shape, there includes a list of clothing items men must avoid, and others that are suitable. To test out the rules, Trinny and Susannah travel to a Cumbrian slate mine for the miners to take the rules and go shopping on their own. After the trial, they fear the rules are not simple enough. They seek the help from an advertising company who come up with the idea of arranging the six rules in the form of the Highway Code, therefore renaming the rules The Male Dress Code. Meanwhile, the fashion duo have arranged for the male section of an Oxford Street department store to be sectioned off to allow a male only day. The section has the six important rules displayed, complete with six live male manikins, one for each body shape, to demonstrate the clothing rules. They also invite some of the civil engineers and slate miners to test the newly formatted rules. Then outside of the store, Trinny and Susannah unveil the six male manikins in the shop window to the women outside.

Shape – The third episode features Trinny and Susannah exploring the theme of shape, where they promote wearing clothes suitable to body shape rather than clothing size. Trinny and Susannah get 60 size 16 women to wear an identical size 16 dress in order to discover how many women the dress fits properly. They find that the dress only fits two women, despite all 60 being classed as a size 16. To explore how women see their own bodies, the duo take their pink box in which women can draw their impressions of themselves, finding that they all see their bodies in different shapes. Then 60 of the women from the investigation are introduced to 12 different objects which Trinny and Susannah believe can represent all women's body shapes. The shapes include 'apple', 'hourglass', 'skittle', 'vase', 'cornet', 'lollipop', 'column', 'bell', 'goblet', 'cello', 'pear' and 'brick'. The different objects are displayed around a gallery where twelve women with tightly fitted outfits, to show their figures clearly, stand next to the object which they best represent to demonstrate the general idea. Each model is then given a makeover according to the rules which Trinny and Susannah have applied to each body shape. The rest of the women are then required to go shopping to buy themselves clothes, complying with the rules. Only the women with the correct shape clothes receive their money back. Also around the town are the 12 live manikins, standing by a list of the rules for their body shape.

To end their body shape campaign, Trinny, Susannah and 100 women go to the hillside chalk carving, the Long Man of Wilmington, where Trinny parades a made over woman from each shape category. Meanwhile, in the distance, Susannah organizes the others into changing the shape of the Long Man into a more feminine one by lying down in white boiler suits to give the symbol pigtails, hips and breasts. The event does not come without protest, where Pagans gather in an attempt to stop the proceedings. The episode ends with Trinny and Susannah taking off in a helicopter to view the Long Man with a female form.

Age – During the fourth episode Trinny and Susannah investigate the theme of age. They aim to encourage the older generation to reclaim the high street and become more comfortable with shopping. Trinny remarks "I think for older women it becomes far more complicated as you age because you've got issues, such as what is age appropriate, their budget, their bodies are changing and it can just get worse and worse and more and more difficult." To view the way in which women age, a human timeline is created by arranging some 20 to 70-year-old women in a line wearing just their underwear.

Trinny and Susannah then take their pink box in search of older women to talk about their clothing. They find that many of them feel a lack of confidence and hide themselves behind clothing, and do not have any knowledge of what to wear. Then the process of Susannah being aged through prosthetics begins. To give an accurate depiction of how Susannah would look at the age of 70 years, a plastic surgeon and prosthetic expert take details of her lifestyle and examine past pictures to see how she is aging. When the face mask and body suit are fitted, Susannah is clearly distressed and states "There is no way I'm going to look like this when I'm 70. I will not dress like this and I will not allow my face to become like this." An elderly woman, Shirly Tripe, then takes Susannah shopping to find her some clothing from her own favourite shops. Susannah comments on Shirley's choice: "It's a sack. This is a testament that older women, or mature women, benefit so much from tailoring." Susannah then meets a shocked Trinny with her new appearance. The two fashionistas then aim to tackle what they believe older women should avoid; wearing loose fitting clothes. They take Shirley shopping to get some tighter fitting clothes, although Shirley shows much resistance and claims she looks like 'mutton dressed as lamb'.

Trinny and Susannah arrive at Worthington, where they hold a clothes master class. They makeover three older women, fitting them with high street clothing. One woman in her 70s is given a new look with a jacket from Kate Moss's TopShop range. Susannah comments "if any of you worried about not finding things in a top like Topshop, you're wrong." This is aimed to persuade the group of older women that they will find clothes to suit them in high street shops. A convoy of limousines arrive to take 100 of the older generation to Oxford Street where they reclaim the high street. They explore shops such as New Look and Miss Selfridge in search of fashionable items to enhance their figures. After the spree, all of the women attend the nightclub, The Ministry of Sound where the selected women model the catwalk.

Uniforms – For the last of series one, uniform is investigated by Trinny and Susannah where the duo want to promote wearing fashionable uniforms to work. They set out to prove that uniforms can improve morale and make a workforce feel better about themselves. Trinny and Susannah both accompany their pink box around the country, to get a better idea of how the nation's uniforms look. They then descend upon the annual Somerfield supermarket manager's meeting. Trinny and Susannah then persuade the managers to let them do a re-design of the whole of supermarket's uniform.

Before they perform their project on a grand scale, they decide to get some experience by dressing a small business of all-female driving instructors in uniform. A uniform had been optional, but all of the instructors were keen on the idea. The duo's next step is re-designing the uniform of the catering department at the Princess of Wales Hospital in Bridgend. To get a feel of what it is like working in these uniforms, Trinny and Susannah spend a few hours working at the establishment. One worker commented "We were surprised. Although they are quite posh, they did have a go. They weren't too worried about slops. Although Susannah did say it was making her ill." Before the renewal of the uniform, it consisted of old-fashioned mismatched items, until it was replaced by matching pink gingham outfits. Then came the task of designing a practical outfit for the Somerfield workers. When the items are made, selected members of Somerfield model the catwalk in the fruit & veg section.

== Air dates ==
- Series 1 – 5 editions 7 November 2007 to 18 December 2007
- Series 2 – 8 editions 30 July 2008 to 28 August 2008 (remaining 3 editions scheduled for January 2009.
