= Sézane =

French fashion brand

Sézane is a Paris-based fashion brand founded by Morgane Sézalory in 2013. It is France’s first digital-native clothing label, having started by selling vintage finds on eBay under the name Les Composantes.

Originally associated with vintage-inspired "French-girl" staples like floral blouses, lace detailing, and romantic silhouettes, Sézane in late 2026 introduced a refreshed visual identity and a more structured, minimalist direction with collections emphasizing sharper tailoring, neutral palettes, voluminous shoulders, funnel-neck outerwear, and tactile natural materials like suede, wool, and leather.

Launched in 2016, Octobre Éditions is Sézane’s menswear counterpart, vending classic European-inspired wardrobe staples such as Oxford and flannel button-downs, heavy knitwear, suede jackets, tailored trousers, and leather loafers.

U.S. physical retail locations include New York (Nolita and Upper East Side), Los Angeles, San Francisco, Boston, Washington D.C., and Austin. Its wholesale partners include Galeries Lafayette and Nordstrom.

Sézane holds B Corp certification and utilizes high proportions of GOTS-certified organic cotton, recycled fibers, and audited workshops. Through its Demain Solidarity Program, the brand donates proceeds every month to charities supporting children's education and equal opportunity.

== Collaborations ==
In 2026, Sézane collaborated with Sea New York on a capsule collection.
