= Sea New York =

Fashion label

Sea New York is a contemporary fashion label founded in 2007 by Sean Monahan and Monica Paolini. It is based in New York City.

== History ==
Sea New York was founded in 2007 by Monica Paolini and Sean Monahan, childhood friends who grew up together in Newburgh, New York. In its early years, Sea New York operated from a studio on Canal Street in Lower Manhattan. The founders transformed an old, vacant factory space into both their living quarters and a creative hub.

The brand’s growth was steady and organic, initially relying on online retailers due to limited resources for a storefront. Over time the company managed to secure partnerships with Barneys, Neiman Marcus and Saks Fifth Avenue.

Sea New York opened its first physical store on Canal Street in December 2018. In the following years, the brand continued to expand internationally, opening its first store in Shanghai in 2025.

Sea New York has also launched multiple collaborations, including capsule collections with French brand Sézane and a children’s capsule collection with Zara, each introducing the label to new audiences.
