= Trinny & Susannah: Stylar om Sverige =

- Presented by: Trinny Woodall; Susannah Constantine
- Countries of origin: Sweden; United Kingdom
- No. of series: 1
- No. of episodes: 7

Production
- Executive producers: Amanda Schulman; Clara Ytterborn
- Producer: Mathias Barnekow
- Running time: 44 minutes
- Production company: Mastiff

Original release
- Network: TV4 Plus
- Release: 28 March 2011

Related
- What Not to Wear

Trinny & Susannah: Stylar om Sverige (Trinny & Susannah: Making Over Sweden) is a Swedish/British television show, first aired on Swedish channel TV4 Plus on 28 March 2011.

== Overview ==
In each episode, Trinny and Susannah visit a Swedish city where they go out and find people whom they think need some help with their style. Ten people get chosen for each show and each receives a total makeover and the opportunity to walk the runway in front of their family and friends.

Trinny and Susannah have visited Karlstad, Lund, Stockholm, Borås, Vällingby, Gothenburg and Borlänge.
