= Ready2shop.com =

British dot-com fashion advice business

Ready2shop.com was a British dot-com fashion advice business co-founded in November 1999 by fashion gurus Trinny Woodall (chief executive) and Susannah Constantine. Backed by venture capital from J.H. Whitney & Co. and Atlas Venture, the business (company number 03862258) ceased trading after running out of funding following major cuts in staffing in November 2000. It was dissolved at the end of July 2001, when it was rumoured that the website had debts of £10 million.

Woodall and Constantine became known for their style advice after they started writing for the Daily Telegraph in 1996. They later appeared on Granada Television before later making the popular BBC style series What Not to Wear.

== See also ==
- Boo.com
