= John Duncanson =

John Duncanson may refer to:

- John Duncanson (minister) (c. 1530–1601), Scottish clergyman, tutor and chaplain to King James VI
- John Duncanson (broadcaster), former British television continuity announcer and presenter
- Sir John Duncanson (industrialist), British industrialist
