= Westway (radio series) =

- Genre: Soap opera
- Running time: 15 minutes
- Country of origin: United Kingdom
- Language: English
- Home station: BBC World Service
- Created by: David Hitchinson
- Original release: November 1997 – October 2005
- Website: www.bbc.co.uk/worldservice/arts/features/westway/

Westway is a radio soap opera broadcast twice a week on the BBC World Service from November 1997 to October 2005. It focused on life in and around the fictional Westway Health Centre in West London. It was named after the Westway, the main road route into London from the west.

The principal actors were Jillie Meers as Dr Margaret Sampson, head of the health centre, Nigel Carrington as Dr David Boyce, and Abi Eniola as Dr Joy Onwukwe. It was created and edited by David Hitchinson.

== History ==
At its peak, it was cited that its worldwide listening figures was in the region of 1.7 million with some estimates even higher. Its axing was announced in April 2005 as part of a shake-up of World Service programming.

BBC7 repeated the series between May 2004 and March 2008.

== See also ==
- List of soap operas
