= Trinny & Susannah Undress... =

- Presented by: Trinny Woodall; Susannah Constantine
- Country of origin: United Kingdom
- No. of series: 2
- No. of episodes: 9

Production
- Producer: ITV Productions
- Running time: 60 minutes (with advertisements)

Original release
- Network: ITV
- Release: 3 October 2006 – 19 June 2007

Related
- Trinny & Susannah Undress The Nation

Trinny & Susannah Undress... is a British reality makeover and fashion-themed television programme on ITV featuring fashion advisors Trinny Woodall and Susannah Constantine.

The series sees Trinny Woodall and Susannah Constantine going to different households where couples experience difficulties in their relationship, and exploring how clothing and style impact marriage and relationships. Woodall and Constantine give advice and improve the appearance and style of the couples in an effort to rekindle the marriages and relationships that have become troubled.

== History ==
The series of Trinny & Susannah Undress... was first broadcast on 3 October 2006 and consisted of six episodes. Woodall and Constantine had defected from BBC One, where they hosted the show What Not to Wear, to ITV in Autumn 2006 in order to host their show. The first series of Trinny & Susannah Undress... debuted with strong viewing figures of 4.27 million viewers, and reached a series high of 4.48 million on 24 October. Also in 2006, Trinny and Susannah became the faces of Littlewoods Direct. During their sponsorship of Trinny & Susannah Undress, orders rose by thirty per cent.

The second series of Trinny & Susannah Undress... began on Tuesday 5 June 2007 and consisted of three episodes. The ratings appeared to decrease since the first series, with the show attracting 2.92 million viewers in the first episode. The viewing figures did rise to 3.1 million on the second episode. The format of the first two series exposed Woodall and Constantine to particular criticism that questioned whether they were qualified to deal with some of the serious issues raised. Trinny & Susannah Undress... has also been shown on various other television stations including The Lifestyle Channel in Australia. Woodall and Constantine then hosted Trinny & Susannah Undress the Nation in November 2007.

== International broadcasting ==
Australia on The Lifestyle Channel

Belgium on Vitaya

Canada on BBC Canada

Ireland on TV3

South Korea on Granada International

Netherlands on NET 5

New Zealand on TV ONE

Philippines on Lifestyle Network

Poland on TVN Style (known as Trinny & Susannah rozbierają)/ TVP2 (known as Poradnia małżeńska Trinny i Susanny)

South Africa on The Home Channel

Spain on Cosmopolitan

Slovenia on TV3

Sweden on Kanal 5 (known as Trinny och Susannah Stilakuten)

United Kingdom on ITV

== Episode format ==
"The show is much more emotional now. It's a journey, but it is still about clothes, too. It's been fascinating to see how looking good and having faith in your appearance makes you into a sexier person, which makes you attractive to your partner again. We come in as complete strangers and get to know them all extremely well. It was a privilege for Trinny and I to have these people feel they could open up to us. It was very humbling, too."
— Susannah Constantine talking about Trinny & Susannah Undress...

Trinny and Susannah Undress... starts with Woodall and Constantine becoming acquainted with the couple who are experiencing difficulties in their relationship and due to receive a makeover. Trinny and Susannah do not know anything about the couple's situation and problems so they talk with them to establish what is lacking in their relationship and to see how it has changed from previous years. Woodall and Constantine then evaluate their clothing and ask the couple to put on an outfit in which they feel most confident.

In preparation for a dinner which family and friends attend, the participants have to buy each other a complete outfit on their own, to be worn at the dinner. Each participant then tries the outfit on, where the duo state the good points and then suggest ways in which the outfit could be improved. At the dinner, the friends, family and participants further evaluate the relationship in question and discuss how it can be improved, prompting the couple to confront and realize their issues.

The next day, in a section that is known as The Naked Truth, the couple is together required to reveal themselves behind a silhouette screen, where they see each other nude, but with Woodall, Constantine and the audience at home only seeing a silhouette. The participants have to comment on and point out on a small camera what they think is best about their partner's body and figure and are prompted to confront their insecurities. Confronting issues and using Woodall and Constantine as confidantes, is aimed to help the couple release insecurities and burdens, and ultimately become more at ease with each other.

Woodall and Constantine then take the couple shopping separately to find fashionable and suitable clothing for them which enhances their appearances, to give them more confidence and ultimately help to strengthen their relationship. It is custom for Woodall to take the woman shopping and Constantine to take the man shopping, and enough clothing is bought to arrange and put together twenty-five to thirty different outfits. During the shopping process, Trinny and Susannah use the participants to illustrate which types of clothing are suitable for certain body shapes. The participants are then given a full makeover by Richard Ward, complete with a new hair cut. Their transformed appearances are then revealed to each other at a select location.

== Episode list ==
=== Series one (2006) ===
Episode one: Ellie and Lester - Ellie and Lester appeared as a challenging couple for Woodall and Constantine to transform and help in their first episode. The couple have an age gap of nineteen years and Lester, who is seven inches shorter than Ellie, is struggling to keep their marriage together. Whilst Ellie, thirty-four, goes out to work every day, fifty-three-year-old Lester stays at home to look after their two autistic sons. While Ellie has been dressing in inexpensive, baggy suits, Lester appears to pride himself in a dated collection of casual trousers. It soon becomes apparent that Ellie and Lester's relationship is in a big crisis when Ellie confesses to previously having an affair. Following Ellie's revelation, the couple is taken out shopping to find some fashionable attire to suit their lifestyle. Woodall dresses Ellie in a black dress; meanwhile, Constantine finds some suitable clothes for Lester. A few hours later, after a full make-over, the pair are transformed and reunited, now looking more like a united couple, helping to bridge their age gap.

Episode two: Brian and Froso - Woodall and Constantine find Brian and Froso in a very troubled marriage. They soon learn that Brian and Froso's marriage almost fell apart eighteen months before. Froso was diagnosed with breast cancer on Christmas Eve that same year, and both saw a traumatic time ahead, but united as a couple throughout her treatment and subsequent mastectomy. Froso is now undergoing her recovery and coming to terms with her breast prosthesis, but the couple is experiencing a difficult time in their relationship and fail to remember when they last went out. Unable to share the truth of her body with Brian, Froso fights hard to confront her insecurities with the help of Woodall and Constantine and their silhouette screen. After she shows her body to her husband for the first time after her surgery, their relationship becomes stronger and they feel burdens released. They are soon given a new look and image. Woodall and Constantine take them to a secretly organised service where family and friends are assembled to witness the renewing their wedding vows.

Episode three: Jim and Diane - Jim and Diane have been together for twenty-three years, and according to them, there has not been much time for them both looking and feeling good together. Diane was previously a size six stripper and it was that image which first attracted Jim. Diane, now a size sixteen, is a self-conscious woman who hides her figure in tracksuits. After talking and observing, Woodall and Constantine quickly find that the spark that has been lost inside this relationship can be recovered. Diane and Jim are both given a totally new and fresh look and are reunited. Diane and Jim are also treated to some pampering from hair dresser, Richard Ward.

Episode four: Chris and Tracey - Tracey and Chris have been married just over a year and were very much in love. But even though they were very happy together, they feel under constant pressure from others around them, because Tracey is forty-two and her husband Chris is just twenty-four. With an eighteen-year age gap, Chris is often mistaken for Tracey's son. Woodall and Susannah see that both their wardrobes needed revamping and modernising which will help the couple bridge their age gap. Tracey and Chris hope that by dressing differently they might begin to look more like a couple and be more accepted together. Constantine helps Tracey to overcome her body insecurities by investing in some good items that will emphasize her good figure. As a result of a new appearance, Tracey begins to feel more glamorous. The pair are given a new look and are once again reunited.

Episode five: Bianca and Andy - Bianca was very much looking forward to the time when her husband Andy returned from an eighteen-year stint serving with the RAF. The thirty-four-year-old couple were reunited to help bring up their growing family. But events did not run as expected. With three boys under ten, and a fourth child on the way, Bianca feels over-worked and unappreciated by her partner. Meanwhile, Andy does not adjust easily to spending so much time at home and now feels there is no communication in the partnership. Andy makes an effort to dress up for college, but at home Bianca only sees him in old jeans with socks and sandals. Woodall and Constantine question whether a new wardrobe can help the couple's marriage. Woodall helps Bianca to embrace her growing pregnancy bump with carefully fitted dresses and tops. With the help of hairdresser Richard Ward the couple are transformed and given a fresh look and made to feel happier and more comfortable together in their relationship.

Episode six: Mark and Jo - When Woodall and Constantine meet Mark and Jo, they see a couple who could be "father and daughter". Jo has already undergone a transformation, dropping five dress sizes through hard exercise. She feels ready to take pride in her appearance, but she needs the support of Mark. Her husband has no ambition with clothing and does not think of his appearance at all important, only wearing football tops. Jo wants to revamp her wardrobe but does not really have any knowledge about what clothing is suitable, and resorts to buying her clothes from magazines and only ventures to wear black. After Woodall and Constantine have taken them shopping for new clothing, Mark is improved when dressed in earthy tones which complement his skin tone. Jo sees her complexion brightened by the substitution of black to shades of copper, blue and red.

=== Series two (2007) ===
Episode one: Scott and Sue - Scott and Sue have only been together for five years, but after their daughter was born eighteen months ago, their marriage has been troubled and their relationship deteriorated. Neither of them make an effort with their appearance and Sue only sees Scott in his shabby work clothing at home. A comment made to Sue by her father when she was ten, who called her "fat and ugly" after an argument, has left her scarred and deeply insecure about her body, making her too afraid to become more feminine. After they have been given advice, and their relationship has been observed by Woodall and Constantine, they are taken shopping for suitable clothing separately and their new images are revealed to each other in Rome.

Episode two: Abdul and Liz - The couple in episode two, Abdul and Liz, have been married for eight years. During their married life, their dress sense has become almost identical and both dress in practical outdoor wear. Their clothing is so similar that they have to write on initials in order to differentiate between their own items. Liz feels that she does not have the knowledge about fashion to dress smartly and loathes clothes shopping. Abdul contacted the show originally, fearing that their clothing has a negative impact on their self-confidence and social life, but Liz however feels that they do not have a problem. For dinner parties, Abdul is keen to dress smarter, but feels obliged to dress down to match a more casual Liz. Liz has a demanding job, often coping with a sixty-hour week. Soon into Woodall and Constantine's arrival, they discover that Abdul and Liz sleep in separate beds, so as not to disturb each other. When the couple are revealed behind the silhouette screen, Woodall and Constantine see an admirable figure on Liz that has been hidden by her unflattering clothing. In the makeover, Trinny dresses Liz in a fitted trouser suit and waistcoat to accentuate her figure. To give Abdul more youth, Susannah fitts him with a tailored suit and purple shirt.

Episode three: Amanda and Jozef - This couple met when Amanda was just fourteen. They have since become the parents of two children and feel unhappy in their relationship. Jozef dresses like a teenager, priding himself with ripped jeans and hoodies. He is a landscape gardener and feels that he has lost important contracts as a result of his shabby clothing. Meanwhile, Amanda, through lack of confidence, dresses in clothes that hide her figure. Amanda's stretch marks also contribute to her lack of self-esteem. Pressure is also added to the relationship as Amanda is increasingly jealous of other woman, and even feels wary of Woodall and Josef going shopping on their own. Amanda and Jozef both feel deeply unhappy with their appearance and style and want to restore confidence through clothing. The couple are soon to face The Naked Truth behind the silhouette screen, which reveals that Jozef does not think Amanda really loves him. Undressing behind the screen helps the couple to become more confident with each other. Woodall and Constantine take them both shopping in London the next day, where Constantine dresses Jozef to look casual without being scruffy. Outfits include a jacket and well-cut jeans and a single breasted, one-button suit with slim-fitting trousers, while Woodall dresses Amanda to become sexier and more trendy. The couple's appearances are revealed at a luxury hotel. After they have been re-united, Jozef proposes to Amanda who says "yes".

== Air dates ==
- Series 1: 3 October 2006 to 7 November 2006
- Series 2: 5 June 2007 to 19 June 2007
- Series 3: October 2008
