= Alan Ruscoe =

British actor (born 1972)

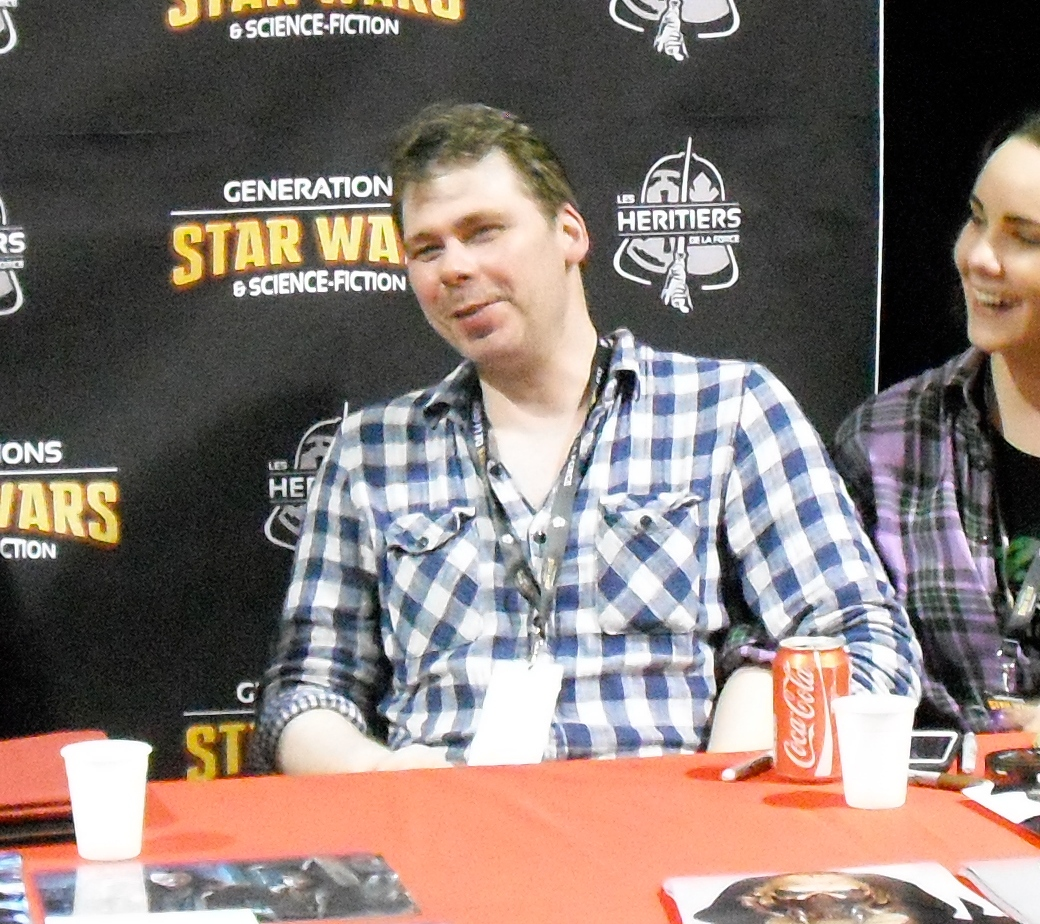
- Ruscoe in 2015
- Born: 14 April 1972 (age 52)
- Occupation: Actor
- Years active: 1996-2013; 2021-present

Alan Ruscoe (born 14 April 1972) is a British actor who is best known for his work as various aliens, monsters and androids in the Star Wars films and the television series Doctor Who.

== Career ==
On television, he has played Baraquel, Sariel and Araquiel in Sky One's Hex season 2, as well as a number of characters in the 2005 series of Doctor Who: Blon Fel-Fotch Passameer-Day Slitheen in "Aliens of London" and "World War Three" (and briefly in "Boom Town"), lead Auton in "Rose", the Anne Droid in "Bad Wolf" and "The Parting of the Ways", Trine-E in "Bad Wolf", and Lute of the Forest of Cheem in "The End of the World". Ruscoe has also appeared in the Doctor Who audio dramas The Veiled Leopard, The Settling, Gallifrey: Annihilation and Bernice Summerfield: Paradise Frost for Big Finish Productions. He also played Andrew Stone, a Mars colonist later taken over by an alien lifeform in the November 2009 Doctor Who special "The Waters of Mars", He also played Marcus in the ITV Soap Emmerdale in 2013.

In films, Ruscoe has played Daultay Dofine, Bib Fortuna and Plo Koon in Star Wars: Episode I – The Phantom Menace, and the Mangalore Kino in The Fifth Element. He also played "the Poulterer" in a 2004 television adaptation of A Christmas Carol. He appears alongside Terence Stamp, Vanessa Redgrave and Gemma Arterton in "Song For Marion" released this year.

In theatre, he has played Deputy and Snake Preacher in Whistle Down the Wind, Riff Raff in The Rocky Horror Show in the English Theatre Frankfurt, Bob Cratchit in the 2004 touring version of Scrooge and Gussie Fink-Nottle in the 2007 UK tour of By Jeeves. In Germany, he played "Bob" the pizza-boy-eating alien for the T-Online television and poster campaign.

== Filmography ==
=== Film ===
| Year | Title | Role | Notes |
|---|---|---|---|
| 1997 | The Fifth Element | Mangalore Kino | |
| 1999 | Star Wars: Episode I – The Phantom Menace | Bib Fortuna / Daultay Dofine / Plo Koon | |
| 1999 | Julie and the Cadillacs | Jailhouse Barman | |
| 2002 | Star Wars: Episode II – Attack of the Clones | Lott Dod / Rune Haako | |
| 2012 | Unfinished Song | Judge | |
| 2021 | Last Night in Soho | Punter 7 | |

=== Television ===
| Year | Title | Role | Notes |
|---|---|---|---|
| 2005 | Hex | Various | 3 episodes |
| 2005–2009 | Doctor Who | Auton; Lute; Slitheen; Slitheen; Slitheen; Anne Droid/Trine-E; Anne Droid; Andy Stone | Rose; The End of the World; Aliens of London; World War Three; Boom Town; Bad Wolf; The Parting of the Ways; The Waters of Mars |
| 2008 | The Sarah Jane Adventures | Clown | 1 episode |
| 2013 | Emmerdale | Marcus | 3 episodes |
| 2023 | Eastenders | Doctor Hilton | |
