= John Duncanson (industrialist) =

British industrialist (1897–1963)

Sir John Duncanson
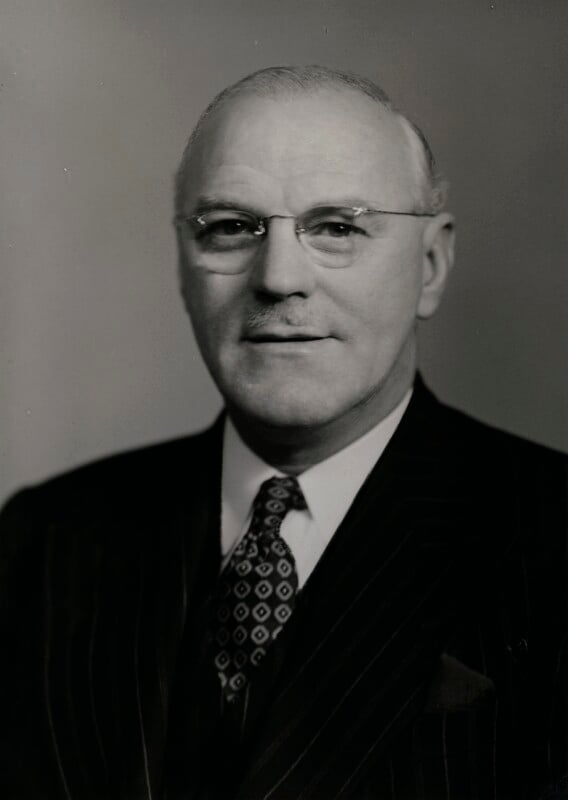
- Duncanson in 1948
- Born: 4 February 1897
- Died: 25 July 1963 (aged 66)
- Occupation: industrialist
- Relatives: Trinny Woodall (granddaughter)

Sir John McLean Duncanson (4 February 1897 – 25 July 1963) was a British industrialist. He served as Steel Controller for the Ministry of Supply during World War II, going on an official tour of the British Empire and the United States to build relations with steel manufactures and importers. He later served as the Director of the British Iron and Steel Federation, the National Commercial Bank of Scotland, Lithgows, and the Lancashire Steel Corporation.

== Biography ==
From 1943 to 1945, Duncanson served as the Steel Controller for the Ministry of Supply and the Steel Company of Scotland. He was sent by Sir Andrew Duncan on a tour of the United States and countries and territories within the British Empire to visit steel plants and build relations with importers.

In his capacity as Steel Controller, Duncanson made an official visit to Ottawa, Canada in 1943.

In May 1943, Duncanson gave a speech about the Allied Powers' access to steel and their advantages over Adolf Hitler and Nazi Germany while on an official visit to Melbourne, Australia.

In August 1945, Duncanson was appointed as the Technical Director of the British Iron and Steel Federation. He left the federation in 1949 to become the Managing Director at Lithgows and, later, a director at Lancashire Steel Corporation and the National Commercial Bank of Scotland.

Duncanson was chairman of the Suez Canal Company during the Suez Crisis of 1956.

British fashion personality Trinny Woodall is a granddaughter of Duncanson.

== Knighthood ==
John McLean Duncanson, Esq. was knighted in 1942.
