= Capsule wardrobe =

Collection of clothing items that do not go out of fashion

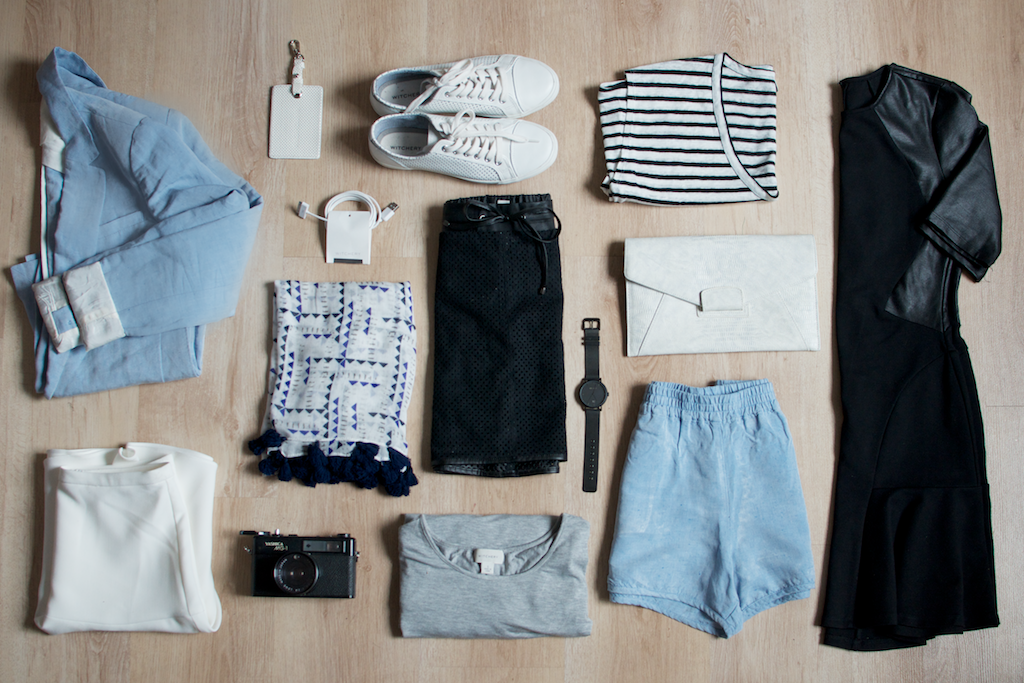
A capsule travel wardrobe

A capsule wardrobe is a minimalist collection of clothes that can be put together in different ways to cover a variety of outfits and occasions. The aim is to have an outfit suitable for any occasion without owning excessive items of clothing. This is usually achieved by buying what are considered to be "key" or "staple" items in coordinating colours. It has been the subject of several popular television series and appears widely in British and American fashion media.

Capsule wardrobes appeared in American publications as early as the 1940s as small collections of garments designed to be worn together which harmonize in color and line. Susie Faux, owner of London boutique "Wardrobe", revived the term in the 1970s. According to Faux, a capsule wardrobe is a collection of a few essential items of clothing that do not go out of fashion, such as skirts, trousers, and coats, which can then be augmented with seasonal pieces. American designer Donna Karan popularised the idea in 1985, when she released an influential capsule collection of seven interchangeable work-wear pieces.

== History and popularity ==
The use of "capsule" to mean "small and compact" was a distinctly American use of the word that surfaced in 1938, according to the Oxford English Dictionary. The term capsule wardrobe appeared in American publications as early as the 1940s to denote a small collection of garments designed to be worn together which harmonized in color and line. The term was revived by Susie Faux, owner of the West End boutique "Wardrobe", in the 1970s to refer to a collection of essential items of clothing that would not go out of fashion, and therefore could be worn for multiple seasons. The aim was to update this collection with seasonal pieces to provide something to wear for any occasion without buying many new items of clothing. Typically, Faux suggests that a woman's capsule wardrobe contain at least "2 pairs of trousers, a dress or a skirt, a jacket, a coat, a knit, two pairs of shoes and two bags".

The concept of a capsule wardrobe was popularised by American designer Donna Karan in 1985, when she released her "7 Easy Pieces" collection. Her aim was to fill what she referred to as "a void in the marketplace" for a stylish and practical wardrobe designed with working women in mind. When the collection debuted, she showed eight models dressed only in bodysuits and black tights. The models then began to add items of clothing such as wrap-skirts, trousers, and dresses, to demonstrate her interchangeable style of dressing.

As a term, "capsule wardrobe" is widely used in the fashion media; the fashion sections in British newspapers The Independent and The Daily Telegraph have run feature articles on capsule wardrobes, as have British Marie Claire and Elle magazines, among others. The concept has been further popularised by several television programmes, including Trinny and Susannah's 'What Not to Wear', which aired on the BBC 2001–2007, and Gok's Fashion Fix, which aired on Channel Four from 2008 onwards. Presenter and stylist Gok Wan asserts that a capsule wardrobe is an especially important tool in a recession as it allows people to look good on a small budget.

== Examples ==
Below are examples of a typical capsule wardrobe, one for women and one for men.

Sample women's wardrobe	Sample men's wardrobe
A belted trench coat	A suit
A pair of jeans	A pair of jeans
A white shirt	A coat
A black blazer	T-shirts
A dress	Cotton shirts
A pair of tailored trousers	A blazer
A pencil skirt	A pair of trousers
T-shirts and camisole tops	A pair of smart shoes
A cashmere sweater	A pair of casual shoes
A sundress	A pair of sneakers
A pair of ballet flats	A pair of rugged boots
A pair of long boots	A wool sweater
A tote bag	A watch
A clutch bag	A jacket
A silk scarf	A knit scarf
Sunglasses	Sunglasses
A pair of high heels	
A pair of casual shoes	

== See also ==
- Simple living
- Normcore
