= Abi Eniola =

British actress

- Born: Manchester, England
- Occupation: Actress
- Years active: 1991–2009
- Television: Grange Hill (2000); Little Britain (2003–2004); The Bill (2008)

Abi Eniola is an English former actress. Known for her roles in Grange Hill (2000), Little Britain (2003–2004), and The Bill (2008), she gave up acting in 2009 and now works as a tutor and Communications Coach at the Royal Academy of Dramatic Art.

In 2023, Eniola became a trustee of the Actors' Benevolent Fund.

== Filmography ==
=== Television ===
Television
Year	Title	Role	Notes
1993–94	Three Seven Eleven	Barbara Richards	8 episodes
1995	Elidor	Sniffer	6 episodes
1998	The Broker's Man	Check Out Girl	Episode: Pensioned Off
1999	Extremely Dangerous	Laurel Ford	Episode #1.1
2000	Grange Hill	Sarita	Episodes: #23.17, #23.5
2001	Happiness	Social Worker	Episode: I'm Doing It for Me
2001	The Glass	Conference Delegate	Episode #1.1
2001	Hearts and Bones	Sarah	Episode #2.6
2002	Strange	Nurse Mandy	
2002–05	Doctors	Lena / Jan Blackmore	Episode: Home Sweet Home; Episode: Hard to Swallow
2002	TLC	Midwife	Episode: Clean White Coat #1.3
2003–04	Little Britain	Social Worker	Episodes: Largest Mince Pie (2003), #2.4 (2004)
2005	Ideal	Alex	Episode: The Pregnancy
2005	Doctor Who	Crosbie	Episode: Bad Wolf
2005	Casualty	Monica Pritchard	Episode: That's Amore
2007	Thieves Like Us	School receptionist	Episode: The Teapot Job
2007	Desperados	Cheryl Malone	5 Episodes
2007	Waterloo Road	Mrs. Dillon	Episode #3.5
2008	The Bill	Beverley Fox	Episodes: Witness: Deadly Secret; Witness: Protection; Witness: Truth & Lies; The Witness: The Final Act
2009	Coming Up	Nursery Manager	Episode Raising Baby Rio
