= Bad Wolf =

166a – "Bad Wolf"
- Doctor Who episode

Cast
- Doctor: Christopher Eccleston – Ninth Doctor
- Companions: Billie Piper – Rose Tyler; John Barrowman – Jack Harkness
- Others: Jo Joyner – Lynda Moss; Jamie Bradley – Strood; Abi Eniola – Crosbie; Davina McCall – Voice of Davinadroid; Paterson Joseph – Rodrick; Jenna Russell – Floor manager; Anne Robinson – Voice of Anne Droid; Trinny Woodall – Voice of Trine-E; Susannah Constantine – Voice of Zu-Zana; Jo Stone-Fewings – Male programmer; Nisha Nayar – Female programmer, Voice of Big Brother; Dominic Burgess – Agorax; Karren Winchester – Fitch; Kate Loustau – Colleen; Sebastian Armesto – Broff; Martha Cope – Controller; Sam Callis – Security guard; Alan Ruscoe, Paul Kasey – Androids; Barnaby Edwards, Nicholas Pegg, David Hankinson – Dalek Operators; Nicholas Briggs – Dalek voice

Production
- Directed by: Joe Ahearne
- Written by: Russell T Davies
- Produced by: Phil Collinson
- Executive producers: Russell T Davies; Julie Gardner; Mal Young
- Music by: Murray Gold
- Production code: 1.12
- Series: Series 1
- Running time: 1st of 2-part story, 45 minutes
- First broadcast: 11 June 2005

Chronology
← Preceded by "Boom Town"	Followed by → "The Parting of the Ways"

"Bad Wolf" is the twelfth episode of the revived first series of the British science fiction television series Doctor Who. The episode was first broadcast on BBC One on 11 June 2005. It is the first of a two-part story. The concluding episode, "The Parting of the Ways", was first broadcast on 18 June 2005.

In the episode, set in the far future 100 years after the events of "The Long Game", the Ninth Doctor (Christopher Eccleston) and his travelling companions Rose Tyler (Billie Piper) and Captain Jack Harkness (John Barrowman) are secretly brought on board the game-show-broadcasting satellite, Satellite Five, by its controller (Martha Cope) so they can fight against the controller's "masters", the Daleks.

== Plot ==
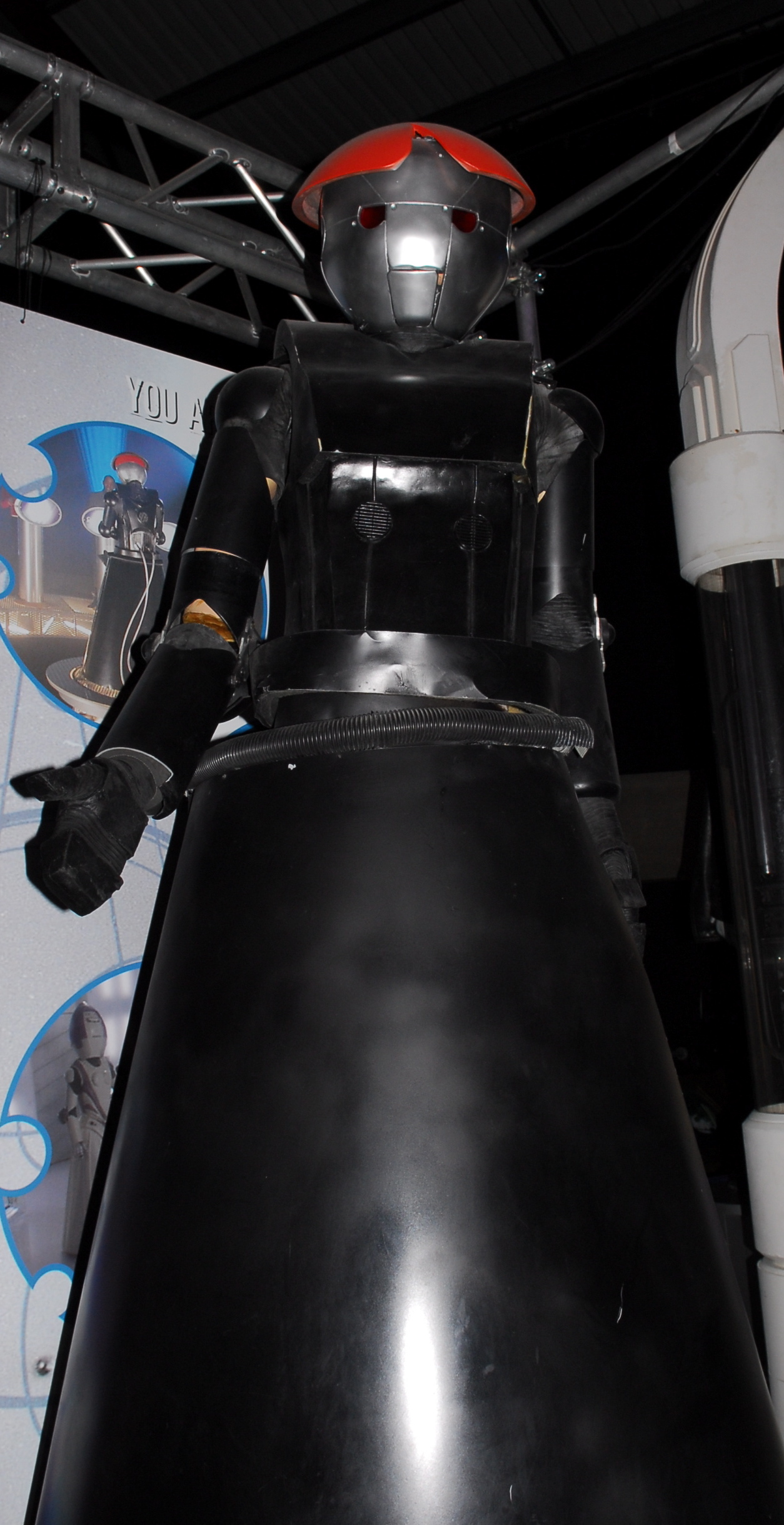
The 'Anne Droid', on display at the Doctor Who Experience.

The Ninth Doctor, Rose, and Jack find themselves separated, waking up with temporary amnesia in various television game shows which are more fatal than their twenty-first century counterparts. On The Weakest Link and Big Brother, anyone voted off will be instantly disintegrated. On What Not to Wear, participants undergo brutal cosmetic surgery. The Doctor escapes Big Brother with a Housemate called Lynda, and Jack escapes What Not to Wear. The Doctor discovers that they are on the space station Satellite Five, now known as "The Game Station", in the year 200,100. The station is now under the control of the Bad Wolf Corporation, which shares the name with a set of words that are following the Doctor and Rose through time and space. (Note: The phrase "Bad Wolf" appears either spoken or written down in every series 1 episode apart from "Rose" and "The Empty Child" (the first part of a two-part story with episode 10, "The Doctor Dances", which does include the words).) Lynda explains that 100 years ago, when the Doctor last visited, (Note: As depicted in the 2005 episode "The Long Game".) Satellite Five stopped broadcasting and the government and economy collapsed. The three search for Rose, hurrying up in a lift as Rose desperately attempts to answer questions. They find her just as she loses the final round of The Weakest Link and is promptly disintegrated by the Anne Droid.

The Doctor, Jack, and Lynda travel to the control room on Floor 500. There, they meet the Controller, a cybernetic human. The Controller uses the cover of a solar flare to speak directly to the Doctor, telling him that her masters cannot hear her during the flare. The Controller used a teleport called a transmat to hide the Doctor and his companions in the games as her masters do not watch them. The solar flare ends before she can tell the Doctor who is controlling her. Jack finds the TARDIS hidden in a restricted area, which he uses to figure out that the show's contestants are not actually disintegrated but transmitted off the station. The Controller begins giving the Doctor the coordinates that the transmat leads to, and is transmitted to her masters, which kill her. Rose wakes up on the floor of a spaceship and is approached by a Dalek. The Doctor and Jack discover a signal coming from the station that is hiding something at the edge of the solar system. They cancel the signal and reveal a fleet of Dalek spaceships. The Daleks open a communication channel to the Doctor, threatening to kill Rose if he interferes. The Doctor refuses to back down and vows to rescue Rose and wipe out the Daleks.

== Production ==
A working title for the episode was "Gameshow World". It was the last of the 2005 Doctor Who episode titles to be revealed. Prior to this, the episode was referred to in promotional literature as "The Parting of the Ways (Part 1)", with "Part 2" eventually becoming simply "The Parting of the Ways".

The concept of the Anne Droid and a futuristic version of The Weakest Link was pitched by Russell T Davies in his second meeting with the BBC about bringing back Doctor Who in 2000 or 2001. The idea had come from his trip to New York City for the launch of the American version of Queer as Folk, where he had seen a billboard in Times Square for the American version of The Weakest Link with "a gigantic Anne Robinson blasting us tiny mortals with her voice".

The production team originally intended to show Jack's naked buttocks on screen. The scene was shot, but the BBC's editorial policy department stepped in and vetoed it, the only time they over-ruled the production team during the 2005 series. According to the DVD commentary for this episode, the music that is heard as the Dalek fleet is revealed includes a chorus singing "What is happening?" (transliterated: Mah Kor'ei) in Hebrew.

Davies mentioned that the "arc word" for the subsequent series was mentioned in this series, as well as being an anagram. One of the answers during The Weakest Link scenes was that the Great Cobalt Pyramid was built on the ruins of the famous Old Earth Torchwood Institute, "Torchwood" being an anagram of "Doctor Who". In 2006, a spin-off series titled Torchwood began, set in modern-day Cardiff and involving a team investigating paranormal and alien incidents, and featuring John Barrowman reprising his role of Captain Jack Harkness.

=== Cast notes ===
Nisha Nayar, the actress cast as the Female Programmer in this episode, previously appeared as one of the uncredited 'Red Kang' extras in the 1987 classic series story Paradise Towers. This made her the second actor to appear in both the classic and new series of Doctor Who, following William Thomas's appearance in the previous episode, "Boom Town". Martha Cope later played Captain Oswin in the audio play The Nowhere Place and Talia in Bedtime Story. Paterson Joseph later played Victor Espinoza in the audio play Earth Aid. Sebastian Armesto later played Anders in the audio play Grand Theft Cosmos.

According to Doctor Who Confidential, although Anne Robinson was invited to voice the Anne Droid, the expectation was that she would decline. A celebrity voice impersonator had already been hired to record the lines when Robinson accepted.

== Broadcast and reception ==
The episode received final rating of 6.81 million viewers, the lowest figure of the series. The episode received an Audience Appreciation Index score of 86.

Digital Spy's Dek Hogan had a positive reaction to "Bad Wolf", praising Eccleston, the parodies, and the Susanna and Trinny robots. Alasdair Wilkins of io9 praised the "mad energy" to the finale and Eccleston's emotion over losing Rose. However, he was critical of the popular culture references, feeling that it would not age well and he could not find a "coherent satirical point in their inclusion". SFX gave "Bad Wolf" a score of nine out of ten, calling the two-parter Davies' "finest work this season", praising the humorous parodies and the reveal of the Daleks. The episode's cliffhanger has been singled out by critics. It was listed by Charlie Jane Anders of io9 among the greatest cliffhangers of the programme, while Den of Geek's Mark Harrison listed it as the Ninth Doctor's best cliffhanger. It was also chosen by Morgan Jeffery and Chris Allen of Digital Spy among the five best Doctor Who cliffhangers; Jeffery wrote that it "isn't the strongest episode of his tenure – let's not forget the Trinny and Susannah robots – but you'd be hard-pressed to fault the climax".
