= What Not to Wear (British TV series) =

British television series

- Presented by: Trinny Woodall (series 1–5); Susannah Constantine (series 1–5); Lisa Butcher (series 6–7); Mica Paris (series 6–7)
- Country of origin: United Kingdom
- Original language: English
- No. of series: 7

Production
- Running time: 60 minutes

Original release
- Network: BBC Two (2001–2003); BBC One (2004–2007)
- Release: 29 November 2001 – 4 October 2007

Related
- Trinny & Susannah: Stylar om Sverige

What Not to Wear is a BAFTA Award-nominated makeover reality television show launched by the BBC in 2001. It was presented by Trinny Woodall and Susannah Constantine for five series, bringing the pair to national prominence. After they left, the BBC produced two more series presented by Lisa Butcher and Mica Paris.

== History ==
What Not to Wear originated on BBC Two in 2001, hosted by fashion gurus Trinny Woodall and Susannah Constantine who also co-authored several fashion books based on the show. The first episode was broadcast on 29 November 2001.

In 2002 during the show's second series, Jeremy Clarkson and Lesley Joseph appeared in a special episode, where Constantine and Woodall gave them a fashion makeover. After Clarkson appeared on the show, he commented "I'd rather eat my own hair than shop with these two again". During the process of choosing which celebrity to give a makeover, Constantine and Woodall compiled a list of who they thought were the worst dressed celebrities. Also in 2002, Constantine and Woodall won a Royal Television Society Award, for being the best factual presenters. The show was also nominated for the Features Award at the BAFTAS in both 2002 and 2003 but was beaten both times.

Trinny and Susannah did a spin-off show in 2003; What Not to Wear on the Red Carpet which featured comedian Jo Brand and news presenter Sophie Raworth having special makeovers to attend a BAFTA Award ceremony. By the end of series three, viewing figures had reached a respectable 2.8 million on BBC Two.

Following a ratings success, What Not to Wear was promoted to BBC One in 2004 to air its fourth series. The format was changed slightly, where a 30-minute show with one makeover was replaced by a 60-minute show featuring two makeovers. The series that aired for the first time on BBC One began on 29 September 2004, and had success with viewing figures which peaked at 5.26 million during the episode aired on 20 October 2004. For a Christmas special aired on 22 December 2004, Trisha Goddard was made over by Constantine and Woodall, where the episode generated 7.42 million viewers. Another What Not to Wear special saw them giving Ingrid Tarrant a makeover. Tarrant, however, did not wear what Constantine and Woodall had selected, and changed her dress in the back of the taxi whilst driving to the award ceremony. The fifth series began on 19 October 2005, where viewing figures still remained strong. On 16 November and 23, 2005 ratings reached 4.91 million and the series averaged with 4.8 million viewers.

In April 2006, it was announced that Lisa Butcher and Mica Paris would take over as presenters of the BBC show, after Constantine and Woodall signed a contract with ITV to host their new show Trinny & Susannah Undress. The new series hosted by Butcher and Paris managed to reach viewing figures of 4.26 million on 19 October 2006 and the first show of the series attracted 4.2 million viewers. The seventh series, which consisted of eight episodes, was aired on BBC One starting in August 2007. The first episode claimed 3.1 million viewers, about 1 million less than the first episode of the last series.

The UK version of What Not to Wear has been broadcast around the world on BBC Entertainment. It is also repeated on Really in the United Kingdom. Constantine and Woodall were also frequent guest fashion and makeover experts on The Oprah Winfrey Show in America. An American version aired on TLC from 18 January 2003 to 18 October 2013 that was originally hosted by Stacy London and Wayne Scot Lukas, with Clinton Kelly replacing Lukas in series two.

== International broadcasting ==
The British version of What Not to Wear has been broadcast around the world, with non-English speaking countries viewing the series in subtitles. The show is broadcast in:

- Australia on Lifestyle Channel
- Argentina on Discovery Home & Health
- Belgium on Vitaya
- Brazil on Discovery Home & Health and SBT (known as Esquadrão da Moda)
- Canada on BBC Canada
- Greece on Skai TV
- Hungary on BBC Prime
- Ireland on TV3
- Israel on BBC Prime
- Mexico on People+Arts (known as ¡No te lo pongas!)
- Netherlands on RTL 4, RTL 8 and BBC Prime
- Norway on TV Norge
- New Zealand on TV ONE
- Peru on People+Arts
- Poland on TVN Style/BBC Prime/TVP2 (known as Jak się nie ubierać?)
- Portugal on SIC Mulher (known as Esquadrão da Moda)
- Sweden on Kanal 5
- South Africa on BBC Prime
- United Arab Emirates on MBC 4
- Spain on People+Arts
- United Kingdom on BBC (repeats on Really)
- United States on BBC America

In Italy the local version of the show, called Ma come ti vesti?!, hosted by Enzo Miccio and Carla Gozzi, is broadcast on Real Time. There is also local version in Russia which is called Snimite eto nemedlenno (Снимите это немедленно, literally Take it off immediately) that was broadcast on STS.

== Presenters ==
- Trinny Woodall & Susannah Constantine (2001–2005)
- Lisa Butcher & Mica Paris (2006–2007)

== Content overview ==
Every episode features an "ambush" style confrontation and makeover of a woman, and sometimes a man, who has been nominated by their friends as particularly unfashionable. The subject has their current fashion sense evaluated. The presenters take particular regard to the participant's body-shape and self-image (with the help of a 360 degree mirror cabinet) and determine what will work best for them. The participant is then given £2000 to go shopping for a new wardrobe, which is supposed to be in accordance with the advice they have been given. Although they are free to spend how they wish, they are spied upon and counselled on the ways of fashion by the show's two hosts.

Trinny and Susannah were often known for their tactile behaviour with the participants and for frequently referring to breasts as "tits". They were also renowned for their direct comments on the show, where Trinny's comments have reduced some participants to tears, and Susannah once spontaneously pulled a female candidate's underwear down during filming as her knicker line was visible.

== Episode format ==
The participant is nominated by their friends and relatives for being particularly unfashionable. The show then secretly follows and videotapes the nominated participant for two weeks. At the end of the two weeks, the fashion experts review the secret footage and prepare to surprise the participant. During the surprise visit, the participant is offered a £2000 cheque to buy a whole new wardrobe. But they must hand over their entire existing wardrobe and be prepared for some harsh criticism and to receive fashion advice from the two experts.

On the first day of the participant's visit to the studios, there is a review of the secret footage along with the participant. On the videotape, there are normally comments from family members and friends about the participant's style and appearance. The experts then go through their entire wardrobe, which has been brought with the participant. They critique the items and then most of the clothing gets discarded or even cut up with scissors. The participant is asked to put on an outfit, that they like and think most suits their figure, and then must face the 360 degree mirror. The experts comment on why the outfit does not suit them. The experts give suggestions throughout the day and then present three different outfits to the participant to help illustrate the rules that they will need to follow as they shop for new clothing.

The participant is then given two days to shop for new clothing at a suitable and selected location. On the first day, they are left to their own devices, to test how much they have learnt about which clothes are "suitable" and comply with the rules. On the second day, the experts ambush the nominee and comment on whether the previous day's purchases complied with the correct guide lines as to which clothes to buy. The second day, the fashion gurus sit in a café and watch live video footage of the participant shopping and comment on whether the participant is following the rules given. If the participant is struggling, they rush to the scene to help. The experts then accompany the participant around the shops, providing advice and assistance, often being critical.

After all the shopping, hair stylists and makeup artists work on the nominee's hair and makeup respectively. After the makeover, the participant reveals themselves to the experts and are brought to a full-length mirror to see their transformed state. The participant models three outfits for the experts, often showing confidence and poise. The participant departs and, soon after, reveals themselves with their transformed appearance to their friends and family. Sometime after the participant's makeover, the fashion gurus pay them a surprise visit, in order to establish whether they have adhered to the rules for their clothing.

In later series, the format changed. It saw the hosts receiving hundreds of videos from certain groups of people that had nominated themselves for a makeover, instead of other people nominating them. There were select groups such as women facing menopause and those who had lost partners. The hosts would have to watch and choose five people from these videos, as to who they thought were in need of help the most. The five selected candidates were then invited to the studios where they would be interviewed on why they thought they needed a makeover à la What Not to Wear. Then two candidates were selected and offered a What Not to Wear makeover. The series also saw the hosts spending a day as the two participants, where they would drive their cars, work in their jobs and live in their homes. There, they would make the participant's husbands a meal, meet their other close family and venture into the participants wardrobe to dispose of any "unsuitable" clothing. The rest of the episode would sustain the format seen in previous series.

== Publications ==
Woodall and Constantine book.

Trinny and Susannah are the authors of several fashion advice books based on the series. Their books have proceeded to become number one bestsellers in Britain and have been translated throughout the world. Other success included when the book What Not to Wear gained Trinny and Susannah a British Book Award in 2003 for "The TV & Film Book of the Year". The book also outsold Jamie Oliver and Nigella Lawson when sale figures reached a total of 670,000 copies.

Books by Trinny and Susannah linked with What Not to Wear include:

- What Not to Wear (2002)
- What Not to Wear 2: For Every Occasion (2003)
- What Not to Wear: The Rules (2004)
- What Not to Wear: For Every Occasion (2004)

== Popular culture ==
A lethal far-future version of the show appeared in the Doctor Who episode "Bad Wolf". Set in the year 200,100, Trinny and Susannah provided the voices of killer androids Trinn-e and Zu-Zanna who offered makeovers in a more gruesome form.

Trinny and Susannah were parodied in the comedy sketch show Bo' Selecta!, in a segment which saw them criticise the dress sense of various celebrities. The pair's tactile nature a key focus of the spoof, as was their frequent references the "baps" of female celebrities.

On the show Big Impression, Alistair McGowan and Ronni Ancona took to spoofing Trinny and Susannah's presenting techniques on What Not to Wear. Trinny and Susannah were also spoofed in a sketch on 2DTV when it showed them giving Santa Claus a makeover, where they substituted his red suit for a casual shirt and trousers.

Trinny and Susannah appeared on Children in Need in 2004, which saw them giving EastEnders characters Little Mo and Mo Harris a makeover in the style of What Not to Wear. In an episode of the last series of French & Saunders, Trinny and Susannah are mentioned as being "bullies" in a Celebrity Grading Report sketch where Dawn French was the headmaster of a celebrity school where she had to write comments on various celebrities.
