= Investigation Discovery (Latin American TV channel) =

TV Channel in Latin America

- Country: Latin America
- Broadcast area: Latin America

Programming
- Languages: Spanish and Portuguese
- Picture format: 1080i HDTV (downscaled to 480i/576i for the SD feed)

Ownership
- Owner: Skydance Latin America and Carriban

History
- Launched: October 1997 (as Travel Channel); April 12, 2010 (as Liv); July 9, 2012 (as Investigation Discovery)
- Former names: Travel Channel (1996-1997); People & Arts Network (1997-1998); People+Arts (1998-2010); Liv (2010-2012)

Investigation Discovery (Investigação Discovery in Brazil) (stylized as ID since 2020) is a television channel in Latin America dedicated to crime- and investigation-themed programming, owned by Skydance Corporation.

== History ==
The channel was launched in October 1997 as the local version of Travel Channel. After the purchase by Discovery Inc. and the BBC, the channel was then renamed "El Nuevo / O Novo Travel Channel: People+Arts" (pronounced as "people and arts"), and again renamed as simply "People+Arts".

The station's programming consisted of a mix of British series, reality shows, hobby programs and some American series, either in their original language with subtitling (Portugal) or dubbed in Spanish/Portuguese with optional English soundtrack; a few Spanish programs originally broadcast by generalist networks also ran on People+Arts.

In January 2010, it was replaced in Portugal on TV Cabo's Channel 82 by Discovery Travel & Living. On April 13, 2010, People+Arts in Latin America was replaced by Liv, originally a channel dedicated to women's entertainment, but quickly evolved into a general entertainment channel, with the addition of series such as Blue Bloods and the 2010 remake of Hawaii Five-O.

On 15 November 2010, BBC Worldwide sold 50% interest in Animal Planet and Liv to Discovery Inc. for $156 million.

On July 9, 2012, Liv was relaunched as the Latin American version of the channel (and called Investigação Discovery in Brazil).
