= British Iron and Steel Federation =

The British Iron and Steel Federation (BISF), formed in 1934, was an organisation of British iron and steel producers responsible for the national planning of steel production. Its creation was imposed on the industry by Ramsay MacDonald's National Government as a precondition to the establishment of steel import tariffs. It was a successor to the National Federation of Iron and Steel Manufacturers, formed in 1918.

Sir William James Larke was the first director of the federation.

It continued to exist until 1967 when the industry was nationalised as the British Steel Corporation during Harold Wilson's second term in government.

== See also ==
- BISF house
- British Constructional Steelwork Association
