= Susannah Constantine =

English fashion writer (born 1962)

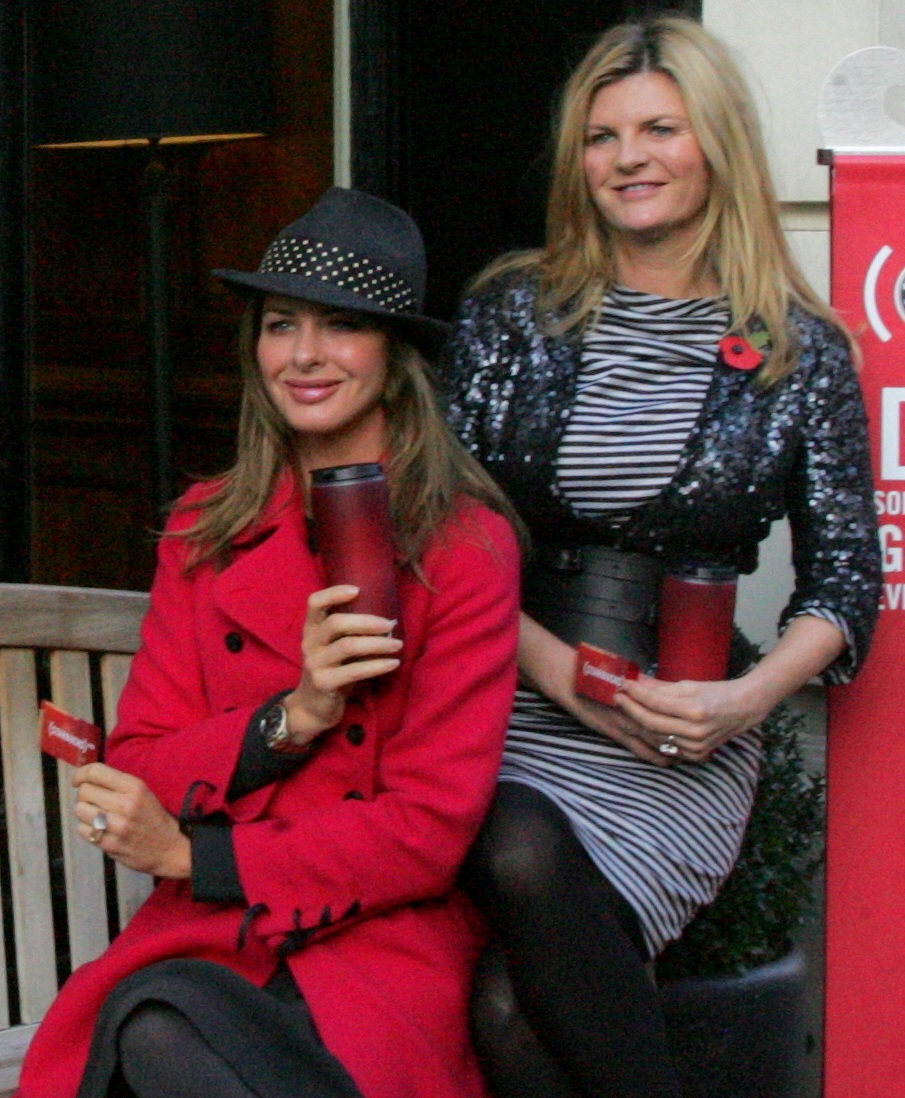
- Constantine on right, next to Trinny Woodall
- Born: 3 June 1962 (age 64); Hammersmith, London, England
- Occupations: Fashion stylist; television presenter; author
- Years active: 1994–present
- Notable credits: What Not to Wear; Trinny & Susannah Undress...; Trinny & Susannah Undress the Nation
- Spouse: Sten Bertelsen (m. 1995)
- Children: 3

Susannah Caroline Constantine (born 3 June 1962) is an English former TV fashion journalist, writer, style advisor, television presenter, author and clothes designer. Her second book, What Not to Wear, co-written with her fashion partner Trinny Woodall, won her a British Book Award and sold 670,000 copies.

Born into an upper class social background with connections to the British aristocracy, she was first known when she went on to date Queen Elizabeth's nephew David Armstrong-Jones, Viscount Linley, during the 1980s. She has been involved in fashion for a long period, originally working in America for Giorgio Armani and then John Galliano in London. She met Trinny Woodall in 1994, with whom she proceeded to co-write a weekly fashion column, Ready to Wear. They founded Ready2shop.com, a dot-com fashion advice business, and wrote their first fashion advice book in 2000, Ready 2 Dress, both of which failed. From there they were commissioned to BBC Two to host the style series, What Not to Wear, from 2001 to 2005. She made regular appearances as a style advisor on The Oprah Winfrey Show and following her success on the shows, she went on to co-host Trinny & Susannah Undress... on ITV in 2006 and Undress the Nation in 2007.

She has co-written fashion advice books with Woodall, some of which have become best-sellers in the United Kingdom and United States. It is estimated that her various style advice books have sold 2.5 million copies in Britain and the United States. Constantine and Woodall have designed their own clothing range for Littlewoods which made its debut in 2007, followed by the release of their latest fashion advice book, The Body Shape Bible.

== Early life ==
Constantine was born at Hammersmith, and raised at Knipton, a small village in Leicestershire. She was privately educated as a child and lived at The Priory—a “gentrified farmhouse”— in Lincolnshire (on the Leicestershire border) for much of her childhood, ‘spending her days exploring the nearby streams and woodlands, riding ponies, fishing and picnicking’ with her childhood friend Lady Theresa Manners, the daughter of the Duke and Duchess of Rutland of nearby Belvoir Castle.

Her father, Joseph ‘Joe’ Constantine, was an Old Etonian and self-taught artist born into a Yorkshire landed gentry family that traces itself back to the 1100s (historically known as the de Costentin family, originating from the Cotentin peninsula in Normandy, that established the Cosmeston fortified manor house in South Wales after joining the Anglo-Norman conquest of Glamorgan). He served as an officer in the Coldstream Guards and was the wealthy shipping and property heir of the Constantine Group—the family shipping firm founded in 1885—of which he served as CEO. Her mother, Mary Rose Constantine (née Cotter), came from an affluent social background with family connections to British aristocracy, who was related through her own mother to the Ley baronets and De Capell Brooke baronets, and was descended from Scottish clan chiefs Ewen MacPherson of Cluny and Simon Fraser, 11th Lord Lovat. Through her Belgian paternal grandmother, Marie Léonie Françoise Constantine (née van Haaren [not to be confused with the noble German von Haaren family or with the extinct noble Dutch van Haren family]), she is a descendant of Dutch prince William the Silent; Marie Léonie Françoise Constantine being a descendant of Countess Josina Geertruijd van Nassau-La Lecq (1743–1816) in her direct maternal line, herself a great-great-granddaughter of Louis of Nassau, Lord of De Lek and Beverweerd (grandson of William the Silent) and his wife Countess Isabella of Hornes.

Constantine described her parents's lifestyle as a privileged, traditional upbringing filled with ‘hunting, shooting, and fishing’.

== Education ==
Constantine was educated at boarding schools including Queen's Gate School in South Kensington, London and St Mary's School in Wantage, Oxfordshire which was run by Anglican nuns. She was first sent to boarding school at the age of 11 years, and recalls her first night away from home: "I sobbed uncontrollably into my pillow."

In mid-2007, Constantine spoke about how she received a letter from St Mary's School, inviting her to come back to the school to talk about her career and success to current pupils. Constantine immediately declined the offer and wrote "No fucking way" on the letter she had received.

== Early career ==
Constantine originally did a year of Montessori training after she had left school but she then moved onto other projects such as studying sculpture in Brussels. She later said of this time that she "lost [her] virginity, went a bit mad." Constantine had taught children for three years, and also worked as a shop girl for Harrods. She wrote a book about present giving, which prompted The Daily Telegraph to write an article implying she had never done a day's work in her life, something which deeply upset her. She has stated "I've always worked."

She worked as a shop girl in America for Giorgio Armani. She later came back to London working for designers Richard James, Patrick Cox, Alistair Blair and John Galliano which gained her an understanding of fashion. She then started working with the British Brain and Spine Foundation and consequently met the sports editor of The Daily Telegraph. Whilst doing a piece for GMTV, he asked Constantine to report the women's World Cup Final in cricket. She proceeded to write about cars and then fashion.

In 1994, she first met Trinny Woodall at a party hosted by David Armstrong-Jones, Viscount Linley. The two women wrote Ready to Wear, a weekly style guide for The Daily Telegraph for seven years. The column promoted affordable high-street fashion and they used themselves to illustrate which clothing suited which figure. Constantine and Woodall became the co-founders of Ready2shop.com, but the business venture failed, and investors lost a reputed £10 million.

Constantine made her television debut when Granada Sky Broadcasting signed her and Woodall to present a daytime shopping show called Ready to Wear, and they released their first fashion advice book, Ready 2 Dress in 2000. The book was unsuccessful and resulted in the pulping of 13,000 copies. Soon after the start of their television career, they secured a frequent makeover slot on the show Richard & Judy. It ensured that they had further exposure in television and gained attention from Jane Root, controller of BBC Two, who signed them up after their book venture and their internet business had failed badly.

== Television ==
=== 2001–03 ===
Constantine began co-hosting What Not to Wear with Trinny Woodall in 2001, in which they criticised participants' appearances and fashion style. Constantine and Woodall hosted What Not to Wear until 2005 and became renowned for their behaviour with the participants, direct advice, and frequently referring to breasts as tits. A notorious moment arose when Constantine spontaneously pulled a female candidate's underwear down during filming as her knicker line was visible. Critics of What Not to Wear argued that the duo were too patronising to their subjects, a claim which they strongly disagree with. Constantine insists that their subjects "see we have a genuine love of women. We love women and they can see that. Women just know." She also stated "Ultimately, what we're doing is giving people confidence. We're probably the only people who have an opinion, who care how ordinary people dress. No one at Vogue magazine gives a shit. They work with the designers, it's more creative and artistic – they are creating something beautiful. But they don't care about how their readers end up looking – whereas we do!" The show made Constantine and Woodall household names and they are now known together as Trinny and Susannah. One reporter has simply referred to Constantine as "the one with 'big tits'."

Constantine has the belief that "anyone can achieve style. It doesn't matter who you are or where you're from." She also says that she finds dressing other women easy, but finds it difficult when dressing herself. Constantine and Woodall share the belief that dressing to flatter body shape is vital, stating "For us, it's all about shape, and how that is going to cure a bodily defect. We're like clothing doctors."

During her time co-hosting What Not to Wear, she and Woodall won a Royal Television Society Award in 2002 for being the best factual presenters. In 2002, Constantine advised Jeremy Clarkson on a celebrity version of What Not to Wear. After Clarkson appeared on the show, Nasir Khan stated "I'd rather eat my own hair than shop with these two [Constantine and Woodall] again". The show was nominated for the Features Award at the BAFTAS in both 2002 and 2003. On the show Big Impression, impressionist Ronni Ancona took to spoofing Constantine's presenting techniques on What Not to Wear.

For charity, in 2002 during the BBC's Children in Need programme, both Constantine and Woodall performed their own version of Madonna's hit single "Vogue". They became the faces of Nescafé in 2003 and featured in television advertisements promoting the brand of coffee. As part of their contract, Constantine and Woodall gave a Nescafé competition winner a £10,000 makeover.

=== 2004–05 ===
Following its ratings success, What Not to Wear was promoted from BBC Two to BBC One in 2004. The format was changed slightly, to a 60-minute show with two makeovers instead of a 30-minute show with only one makeover and also saw Constantine spending a day as one of her subjects. What Not to Wear was also aired in countries such as Spain and Portugal as well as in the American continent.

Constantine appeared on Children in Need in 2004, which included a special segment in which she gave the fictional EastEnders characters Little Mo and Mo Harris a makeover in the style of What Not to Wear, commenting on them with her usual "no nonsense" approach. In 2005, Constantine voiced a robot version of herself in the science fiction series, Doctor Who.

The Oprah Winfrey Show has also seen Constantine and Woodall appearing twice as makeover and style experts. They also did an "Oprah bra and swimsuit intervention". Reflecting on differences in women's style and willingness to submit to makeovers between the UK and America, she stated that although there is not much difference, "The Americans are slightly less adventurous," and that "American women are more open to change and slightly more receptive victims."

=== 2006–present ===
In 2006, Constantine and Woodall moved from the BBC to ITV to start a new show, Trinny & Susannah Undress..., on 3 October. The second series of Trinny & Susannah Undress... was transmitted in June 2007, and it maintained the format of series one which saw Constantine and Woodall advising couples who were finding problems within their marriage. Constantine stated in an interview that filming the show was very emotionally draining, and as a result, she often went home crying. The programme did not come without its critics who questioned the depth at which Constantine and Woodall could deal with serious issues raised during the programme. On 16 October 2006, they both appeared on NBC's The Today Show and performed makeovers on three women especially for the show.

The new series on ITV saw a change in format. In one episode exploring the theme of age, Constantine was transformed into a seventy-year-old with the use of prosthetics and makeup. She stated that it took her four days to get over the sight of herself aged so drastically, and compared the feeling to having an "electric shock". Broadcasting was scheduled for 7 November 2007 and the programme is newly entitled Trinny & Susannah Undress The Nation. On 5 November and 28 December 2007, Constantine and Woodall appeared on Good Morning America and performed makeovers on three women for the show and gave style advice according to the women's shapes. They also reported on the fashion at the 80th Academy Awards especially for the show in 2008. Constantine and Woodall have dressed over 5,000 women as of 2007.

In 2015, Constantine took part in the fifteenth series of I'm a Celebrity...Get Me Out of Here!. She was the first campmate to be eliminated from the show.

On 21 August 2018, it was announced that Constantine would be a contestant on the sixteenth series of Strictly Come Dancing. Her professional dance partner was Anton du Beke. She and du Beke were the first couple to be eliminated from the competition after scoring the lowest scoring Samba and Foxtrot in the show's history, both which scored just 12 points from the judges.

== Beyond television work ==
=== Online ===
In 2010, Constantine and Woodall starred in an online mockumentary series called "Trinny and Susannah: What They Did Next".

An announcement was made that Constantine and Woodall would be touring New Zealand and Australia where they made a series of public appearances at shopping malls owned by the Westfield Group to perform live styling sessions for the company's customers. Their appearances often attracted thousands of spectators. Before the tour, Constantine said "We don't know how New Zealanders dress but we are looking forward to getting over there and finding out."

=== Littlewoods ===
With Woodall, Constantine became the face of the home shopping company, Littlewoods Direct, after orders rose by thirty per cent when Littlewoods sponsored their ITV programme Trinny & Susannah Undress. The pair produced a twelve-page fashion advice section within the Littlewoods catalogue and made a booklet called The Golden Rules, which was distributed to all Littlewoods customers with fashion advice to suit a range of body shapes. They have also produced online style guidelines for Littlewoods.

The first series of Littlewoods television advertisements featured Constantine and Woodall as themselves dressed as two agents trying to rob a Littlewoods designer warehouse, which was followed by Christmas adverts in 2007. The £12 million advertising campaign is one of largest ever for a home shopping and internet-based company. When the campaign began, Littlewoods' sales rose by 18 per cent, with brand awareness and customers visiting the website rising as well.

On 20 September 2007, Constantine and Woodall launched their own Littlewoods women's clothing range which consists of trousers, coats and tops which like their underwear range, are designed to make certain areas appear slimmer. A series of eight dresses, cashmere knitwear, faux fur and sequinned shrugs also feature in the range.

=== Books ===
Constantine has co-written several style advice books with her fashion partner Trinny Woodall, which have sold over an estimated 2½ million copies worldwide. The fashion advice books have been number one bestsellers in Britain and the United States, appearing on both the Sunday Times bestseller list and The New York Times best-seller list, and have been translated throughout the world.

Their most successful book to date, What Not to Wear, was published in 2002 which displayed chapters such as "Big Tits", "No Tits" and "Big Bum" with fashion advice for each category. It became an instant best-seller with total sales reaching 670,000 copies. Before the prime book selling season, their book had sold 250,000 copies in Britain. The book was at one point selling 45,000 copies each week and sold 300,000 copies in just fifteen weeks, eventually making sales worth £8.7 million. In 2003, it won a British Book Award for TV & Film Book of the Year. Despite the book becoming an instant hit, Constantine and Woodall were only given an advance of £10,000. It was subsequently reported that the pair had secured a £1 million book deal to write more of their fashion books.

Constantine and Woodall's latest book, The Body Shape Bible, was published on 18 September 2007. In the book, women can interpret which body shape they are, and can then be given adequate fashion advice on their own individual shape. A few pages in the book are also devoted to illustrating some of Constantine and Woodall's own fashion disasters.

In 2017, Constantine published her first novel, After the Snow.

In 2022, Constantine published a memoir, Ready for Absolutely Nothing, detailing her rise to rise to fame as an "It girl" in the 1980s and her subsequent career as a television fashion commentator.

In 2025, Constantine was one of the judges of the 'Published Novel' category of the Comedy Women in Print Prize.

=== Podcast ===
In January 2020, Constantine launched My Wardrobe Malfunction, a "revealing podcast about our relationship with the items we wear". Guests were invited to share their 'comfort blanket', 'burial suit' and 'wardrobe malfunction'. The first season featured interviews with eight high-profile guests: Michelle Visage, Tan France, Elizabeth Hurley, Nile Rodgers, Trinny Woodall, Joe Sugg, Kristin Scott Thomas and Stacey Dooley. It continued throughout the year and, by December 2020, there had been five seasons and 40 episodes in total. Season six began on 4 February 2021 with Jane Seymour as the first guest.

== Personal life ==
When she was young, Constantine would rely on her father for fashion advice and has commented that any style that she has, she learned from him. He was a talented artist and was offered worldwide art exhibitions, although he was too modest to accept. His death came suddenly and was a milestone for Constantine.

Constantine became a fixture in 1980s British gossip columns and newspapers as the result of her relationship with Princess Margaret's son, David Armstrong-Jones, Viscount Linley, which lasted for eight years. Constantine admitted that her relationship with Linley undeniably opened doors for her, but after they broke up, she was keen to put the episode behind her and become well known in her own right. She dated Imran Khan, then a cricketer and playboy, later Prime Minister of Pakistan, in 1992. She also visited Pakistan in the time of the short-lived relationship. Constantine married Danish entrepreneur and businessman Sten Bertelsen in 1995, who launched Death cigarettes, with whom she has three children; Joe, Esme and CeCe. Constantine and her family live a 120-acre (0.49 km^{2}) property in Handcross, West Sussex.

Constantine has spoken of the constant pressure to look good in public but affirms "We're as much in the business of dressing ourselves – but more importantly helping other women to do that." Constantine has admitted to a fear of growing older: "I just don't want to get old. Old women are invisible, and I don't want to be invisible," she has said.

In 2002, while on a visit to the Cannes Film Festival, Constantine and Woodall were the victims of gem thieves. The thieves broke into the villa on the French Riviera where they were staying, rendered Constantine and Woodall unconscious with chloroform, and then stole money and jewellery.

Carol Vorderman was involved in a feud with Constantine and Woodall in 2003. Vorderman commented harshly about the double-act, referring to them as 'Tranny and the Horse', based on their appearance, after they had called her an "overdone Eighties nightmare" and named Vorderman in their list of the 20 worst-dressed celebrities.

=== Views ===
In August 2014, Constantine was one of 200 public figures who were signatories to a letter to The Guardian opposing Scottish independence in the run-up to September's referendum on that issue.

In August 2020, she said she hates cyclists so much that if she saw her own husband out on the road in Lycra, she would run him over. Speaking on the My Wardrobe Malfunction podcast, Constantine said "Oh I hate cycling, I won't cycle. No, I fucking hate cyclists. My husband is a cyclist and if I see him on the road on his bicycle, I'm going to run him over... And the day when I know I'm about to die, I'm going to get in my car, aged 90, and I'm going to drive into cyclists wearing Lycra, kill the lot of them and go and die in Guam."

== Bibliography ==
- Ready 2 Dress: How to Have Style Without Following Fashion, Weidenfeld Nicolson (14 February 2000) (ISBN 0-304-35425-2)
- What Not to Wear, Weidenfeld Nicolson (5 September 2002) (ISBN 0-297-84331-1)
- What Not to Wear: The Rules, Weidenfeld Nicolson (1 June 2004) (ISBN 1-84188-249-6)
- What Not to Wear: For Every Occasion, Weidenfeld Nicolson (1 June 2004) (ISBN 1-84188-236-4)
- What You Wear Can Change Your Life, Weidenfeld & Nicolson (17 September 2004) (ISBN 0-297-84356-7)
- What Your Clothes Say About You, Weidenfeld & Nicolson (29 September 2005) (ISBN 0-297-84357-5)
- Trinny and Susannah: The Survival Guide, Weidenfeld & Nicolson, (20 September 2006) (ISBN 0-297-84426-1)
- Trinny & Susannah Take on America: What Your Clothes Say about You, HarperCollins Publishers (October 2006) (ISBN 0-06-113744-8)
- The Body Shape Bible, Weidenfeld & Nicolson (18 September 2007) (ISBN 0-297-84454-7)
- Who do you want to be today? Be Inspired to Dress Differently, Weidenfeld & Nicolson (11 September 2008) (ISBN 0-297-85452-6)

== Television appearances ==
Year	Programme	Other notes
2001–2005	What Not to Wear	Presenter
2005	Doctor Who	Episode "Bad Wolf", voice of Zu-Zana
2006–2007	Trinny & Susannah Undress...	Presenter
2007	Trinny & Susannah Undress The Nation	Presenter
2009	Making Over America	Presenter
2010	Trinny & Susannah: Missie Vlaanderen	Presenter
2011	Trinny & Susannah: Making Over Israel	Presenter
2015	I'm a Celebrity...Get Me Out of Here!	Contestant (series 15)
2018	Strictly Come Dancing	Contestant (series 16)
2020	How's Your Head Hun?	Guest appearance

== See also ==
- List of I'm a Celebrity...Get Me Out of Here! (British TV series) contestants
- List of Strictly Come Dancing contestants
