= Trinny Woodall =

English fashion advisor and designer (born 1964)

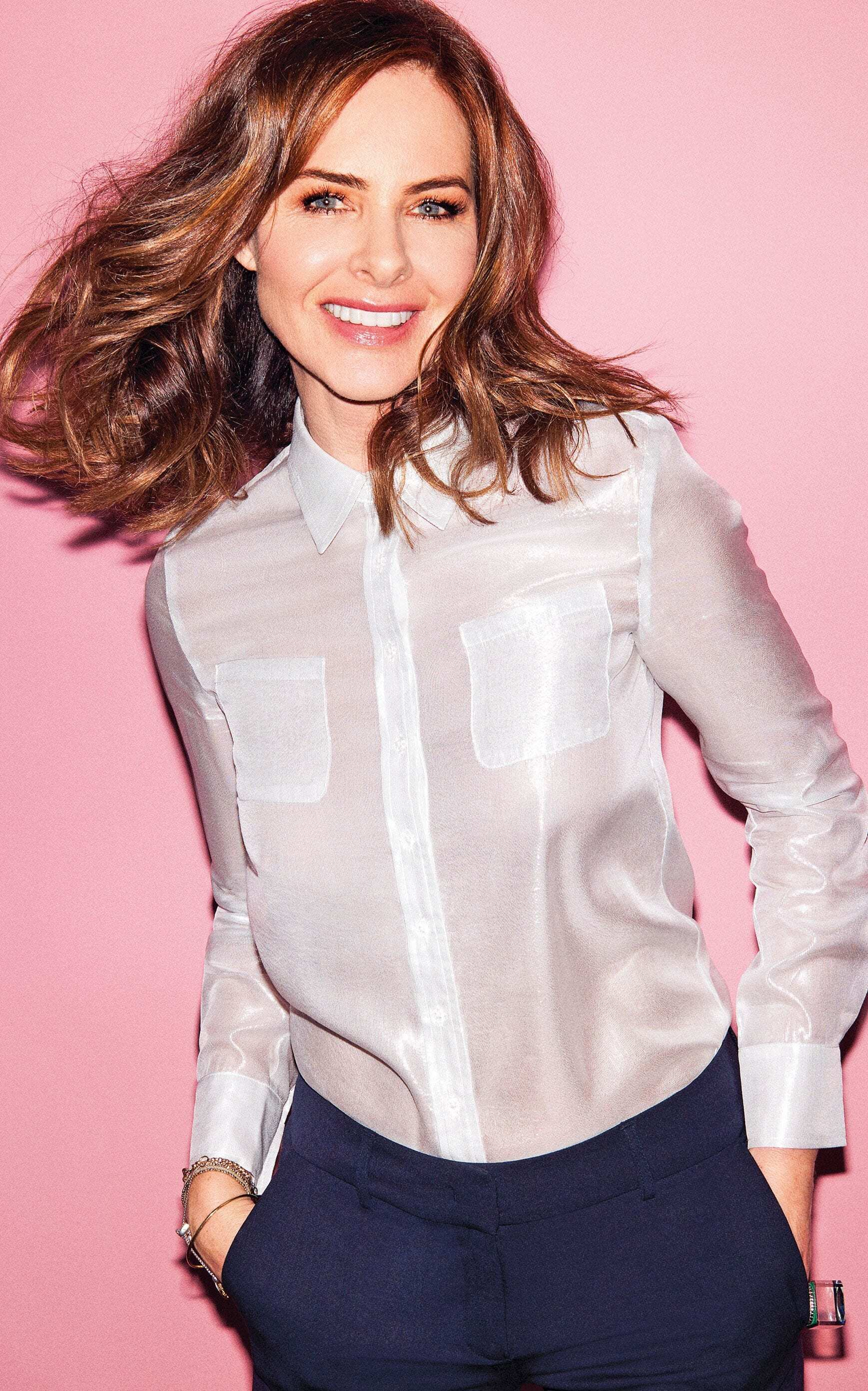
- Born: Sarah-Jane Duncanson Woodall; 8 February 1964 (age 62); Marylebone, London, England
- Occupations: Founder and CEO of Trinny London, businesswoman, make-over and fashion expert, television presenter, author
- Years active: 1996–present
- Notable credit(s): What Not to Wear; Trinny & Susannah Undress... Trinny & Susannah Undress the Nation
- Spouse: Johnny Elichaoff (m. 1999; div. 2009)
- Children: 1
- Relatives: Sir John Duncanson (grandfather)
- Website: trinnylondon.com

Sarah-Jane Duncanson "Trinny" Woodall (born 8 February 1964) is a British beauty entrepreneur, businesswoman, and the founder of cosmetics brand Trinny London.

Woodall initially rose to fame as a fashion and makeover expert, television presenter and author. With Susannah Constantine, she formed half of the duo Trinny and Susannah; together they wrote a weekly fashion column for The Daily Telegraph before being commissioned by the BBC to host What Not to Wear in 2001. This was followed by several other television projects, books and clothing ranges.

== Early life ==
Woodall is the youngest of six children, including three half-siblings from her father's first marriage. Her father was a banker, while her maternal grandfather was Sir John Duncanson, Steel Controller for the British Ministry of Supply in the last two years of the Second World War. He went on to become managing director of the British Iron and Steel Federation (BISF) in August 1945 and then managing director of Lithgows in 1949.

When Woodall was five years old, she was sent home from school after cutting off another pupil's plait. A family friend, Ronald Searle, who created the St Trinian cartoons that inspired the later films, likened her to a mischievous St Trinian girl, and the name Trinny stuck from then onwards. Woodall was educated at boarding schools from the age of six, which included Queen's Gate School in Queen's Gate, South Kensington. She also attended Baston School for Girls.

She has described one of the boarding schools as "cruel" and "sadistic". She has connected a fear of being naked with the time she was made to stand totally unclothed in front of the other pupils as a punishment for having a water fight. Woodall also attended boarding schools in France and Germany between the ages of twelve and fifteen. During her school years, she felt overshadowed by her older sister who was the "star of the school", which prompted pupils to use Woodall to get to her sister.

== Career ==
=== Early career ===
Woodall and Susannah Constantine first collaborated in 1996 on Ready to Wear, a weekly style guide for the Daily Telegraph which ran for seven years. The style guide highlighted affordable high-street fashion, with the pair using themselves to demonstrate clothing that suited different figures. Woodall assumed the role of stylist and made the duo's business decisions.

=== Television ===
Woodall and Constantine became household names as co-hosts and fashion advisors for five series of the BBC television series What Not to Wear. They combined their fashion knowledge and their infamous straight-talking advice to improve the dress sense of the candidates selected for the show.

In 2002, Woodall and Constantine won a Royal Television Society Award for their work on What Not to Wear, in the category of best factual presenter. The show itself was nominated for the Features Award at the BAFTAS in both 2002 and 2003.

With What Not to Wear proving popular on BBC America, they frequently contributed as makeover and fashion experts on The Oprah Winfrey Show.

After What Not to Wear, Woodall and Constantine transferred from the BBC to ITV, and began their new television show, Trinny & Susannah Undress..., in 2006.

Woodall has also made regular appearances giving fashion and beauty advice on shows such as This Morning, The Today Show and The Marilyn Denis Show.

In 2017, Woodall founded direct-to-consumer cosmetics brand Trinny London.

=== Books ===
Woodall and Constantine have co-written numerous fashion advice books, which have sold over three million copies worldwide. Their books have been translated throughout the world and have placed them number one on both The Sunday Times best-seller list and The New York Times best-seller list.

In 2023, Woodall published the book Fearless, and an accompanying podcast of the same name.

== Awards ==
Year	Country	Organisation	Award
2020	UK	CEW Achiever Awards	Achiever Award
2021	UK	LDC	Top 50 Most Ambitious Business Leaders The Digital Disruptor Award

== Television credits ==
Year	Programme	Other notes
2001–2005	What Not to Wear	Herself
2002	The Kumars at No. 42	Herself, interview
2003	What Not to Wear on the Red Carpet	Herself
2003	V Graham Norton	Herself, interview
2003	Parkinson	Herself, interview
2004	The Terry and Gaby Show	Herself, interview
2004	Friday Night with Jonathan Ross	Herself, interview
2004	Children in Need	Herself
2004	Top Gear	Herself, interview and racing
2004	This Morning	Herself, interview
2005	Comic Relief: Red Nose Night Live 05	Herself
2005	Parkinson	Herself, interview
2005	This Morning	Herself, interview
2005	Doctor Who	Episode "Bad Wolf", voice of Trine-e
2006	Parkinson	Herself, interview
2006	This Morning	Herself, interview
2006	Sport Relief	Herself
2006	Ant & Dec's Saturday Night Takeaway	Herself, interview
2006	The Sharon Osbourne Show	Herself, interview
2006	The View	Herself, interview
2006	The Today Show	Herself
2006–2007	Trinny & Susannah Undress...	Herself
2007	Richard & Judy	Herself, interview
2007	Comic Relief Does The Apprentice	Herself, contestant
2007	Friday Night with Jonathan Ross	Herself, interview
2007	GMTV; LK Today	Herself, interview
2007	Good Morning America	Herself
2007	This Morning	Herself
2009	Making Over America	Herself
2009	Would I lie To You?	Herself
2009	7 days on the breadline	Herself
2010	Trinny & Susannah: Missie Vlaanderen (channel Vitaya/Belgium)	Herself
2011	My Life in Books BBC2	Herself, Interview
2011	Trinny & Susannah ubierają Polskę (channel TVN Style Poland)	Herself
2011–2012	Trinny & Susannah: Missie Holland (channel RTL NL)	Herself
2011–2014	Trinny & Susannah: Stylar om Sverige (channel TV4 Plus Sweden)	Herself
2011–2015	"Trinny & Susannah: Making Over Israel" (Channel 10, Israel)	Herself
2011–2015	Trinny & Susannah: Oppdrag Norge (channel FEM)	Herself
2013	Trinny & Susannah's Makeover Mission India(TLC)	Herself
2015	The Real Housewives of New York City	Herself
2016	ITV This Morning	Herself
2019	RTE Ireland	Herself
2020	Sky News	Herself
2020	The Six O'Clock Show	Herself
2020	Sunrise	Herself
2021	BBC News	Herself
2021	CBNC	Herself
2021	BBC Breakfast	Herself
2021	The Six O'Clock Show	Herself
2021	Today Weekend Edition	Herself
2021–2022	Marilyn Dennis Show	Herself
2022	Studio 10	Herself
2022	The AM Show	Herself
2022	RTL Boulervard	Herself
2022	Today Show	Herself
2023	ITV This Morning	Herself

== Personal life ==
Woodall married entrepreneur and former drummer Jonathan Elichaoff in 1999. They had a daughter about 2003. They divorced in 2009 after two years of separation. The divorce financial settlement eventually led to a complex and novel legal case in 2016. Elichaoff became bankrupt before the divorce was finalised and the trustee in bankruptcy sought to void the settlement, after Elichaoff took his own life in 2014, and make Woodall responsible for the bankruptcy debts of about £300,000. The case proceeded to hearings in the High Court, where the claim was rejected and later leave to appeal was denied, as orders over a divorce settlement can only be made during their joint lives.

Carol Vorderman was involved in a feud with Constantine and Woodall in 2003. Vorderman commented harshly about the double-act, referring to them as 'Tranny and the Horse', based on their appearance, after they had called her an "overdone Eighties nightmare" and named Vorderman in their list of the twenty worst-dressed celebrities.

In 2013, Woodall began a relationship with Charles Saatchi. Saatchi had recently been divorced six weeks previously by ex-wife Nigella Lawson, following a notable incident of him strangling Lawson that came to light after being photographed by a paparazzi photographer. Woodall claimed to not know about the incident, despite it being widely publicised at the time. In 2023, after ten years, Woodall and Saatchi broke up, with Woodall citing she "felt alone" in the relationship, and that it felt "very good" to be single again.

== See also ==
- Trinny and Susannah
