= VTM 3 =

Belgian Flemish television channel

- Country: Belgium

Ownership
- Owner: DPG Media
- Sister channels: VTM; VTM 2; VTM 4; VTM Gold; VTM Life

History
- Launched: 25 August 2000
- Former names: Vitaya (2000–2020)

Links
- Website: vtm.be

Availability

Streaming media
- VTM Go: Watch live (Belgium only)

VTM 3 is a Flemish television station. The station got its license for 9 years in 1999 and it started to broadcast on 25 August 2000. VTM3 can be seen on Flemish cable and satellite services. The station is part of DPG Media (formerly Medialaan, VMMa, and VTM).

== History ==
VTM 3 was launched as Vitaya and began as a niche station with seven blocks of programming:

- Eet-Wijzer
- Gemengde Gevoelens
- Spiegelbeeld
- Vrije Tijd
- Wonen
- Kinderen
- Vitali-Tijd

In 2003, the station expanded the broadcast time in favor of more local productions, daily newscasts, a cooking show, and a fitness show.

Vitaya profiled itself as a lifestyle station and is oriented at the following subjects: happiness, health, good food, the family, gardening and interior design, fashion, leisure and travel, lifestyle, and human interest.

Because of the launch of the SBS station Vijf with a similar profile, Vitaya received some competition. Vitaya started to show more foreign productions and produced more own programs and thereby drastically expanded the broadcasting time. In that way, the station was able to keep on growing and end 2005 in the green.

On 31 August 2020, Vitaya rebranded as VTM 3, as part of a rebranding of the 4 main DPG channels. VTM 3's main point was the broadcast of at least one feature film every day. The emphasis on films and TV series deviated from the initial female format of the channel.
